= List of Futurama guest stars =

This is a list of guest stars who appeared on Futurama, an animated comedy created by Matt Groening. Like Groening's other animated show, The Simpsons, Futurama features a large number of celebrity guests contributing their voices to the show, whether as themselves or as fictional characters. This list does not include those celebrities whose voices were impersonated. Due to the futuristic setting of the show the majority of the guest stars playing themselves are actually playing their own disembodied heads in a jar.

Guest stars are listed in chronological order by episode. Each episode's guest stars are listed in alphabetical order. People who guest star in multiple episodes are listed for each separate episode they appear in; as such if they play multiple roles in one episode these will be listed together.

There are several non-regular voices who make appearances but are credited as "also starring" and not guest voices. These voices are not mentioned here.

== History ==
Guest stars have appeared on Futurama since its first season, in addition to the show's main cast of Billy West, Katey Sagal, John DiMaggio, Tress MacNeille, and Maurice LaMarche and supporting cast of Kath Soucie, Dawnn Lewis and former supporting cast member Dee Bradley Baker, Feodor Chin, Cara Delevingne and Bumper Robinson. Frank Welker started as recurring actors in the first season, but joined the guest stars starting with the tenth season. Tom Kenny started as recurring actors in the first season, but joined the guest stars starting with the sixth season, another guest stars starting with the eleventh season. Nicole St. John started as recurring actors in the second season, but joined the guest stars starting with the ninth season and eleventh season. Phil LaMarr, Lauren Tom, and David Herman started as recurring actors in the first season, but joined the main cast starting with the sixth season. Kevin Michael Richardson joined the guest stars in cast in the eleventh season after supporting roles in seasons eight, nine and ten.

== Guest stars ==
- The color of the season number in the first column corresponds to the color of that season's DVD boxset.
- In the No. column:
  - The first number refers to the order it aired during the entire series.
  - The second number refers to the episode number within its season: i.e. 2ACV07 would be the seventh episode of the second season.
- The production code refers to the code assigned to the episode by the production team.
- Guests with "(archival)" after their names refer to cases where roles were not recorded specifically for the episode, but instead archival audio and/or footage from independent sources was used in the episode. In most cases these appearances have been uncredited and are usually not considered as proper guest stars given the circumstances.

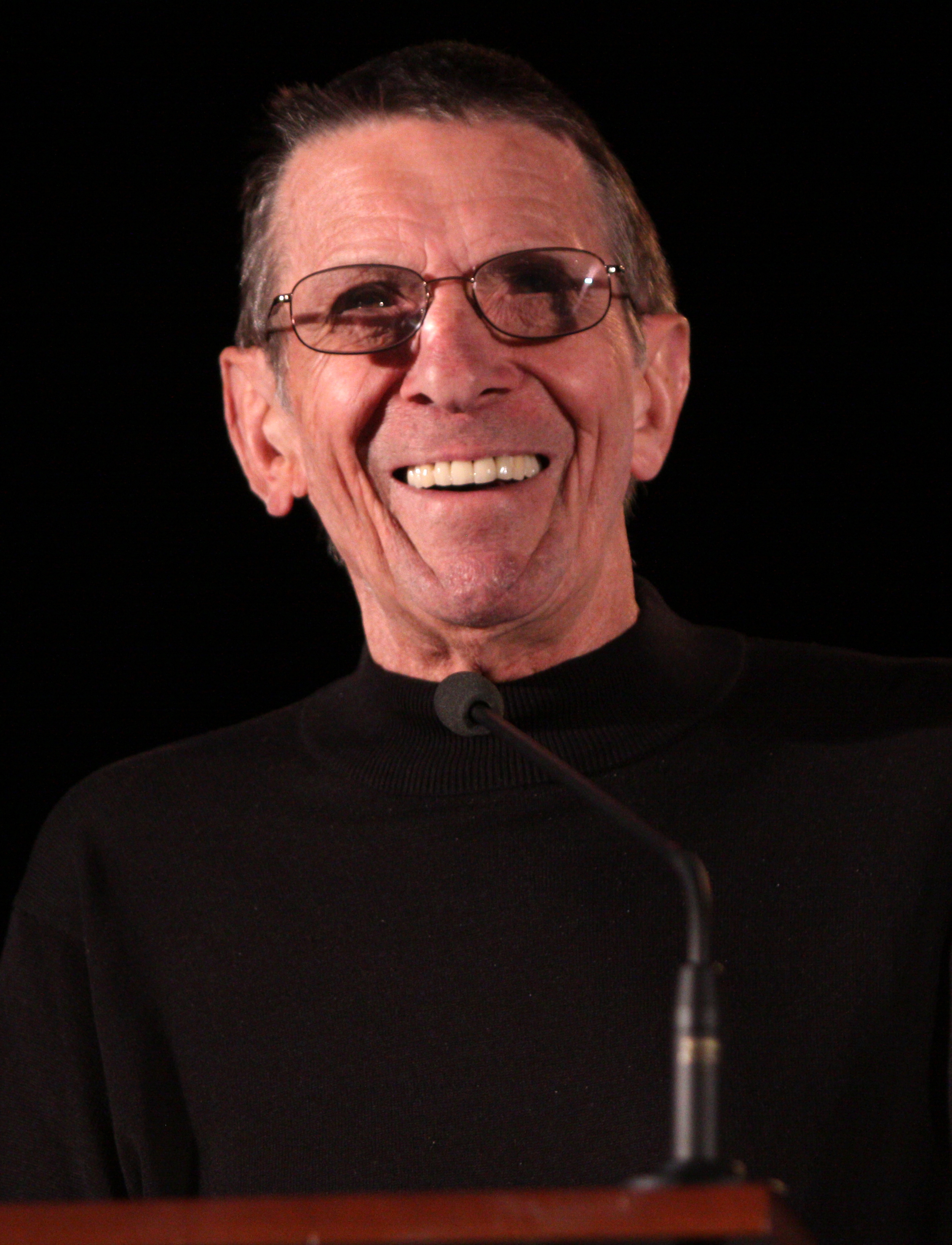
Leonard Nimoy guest starred as his bodyless head in the pilot episode of the series.

Al Gore has guest starred five times as himself throughout the series, the first time in episode "Anthology of Interest I".

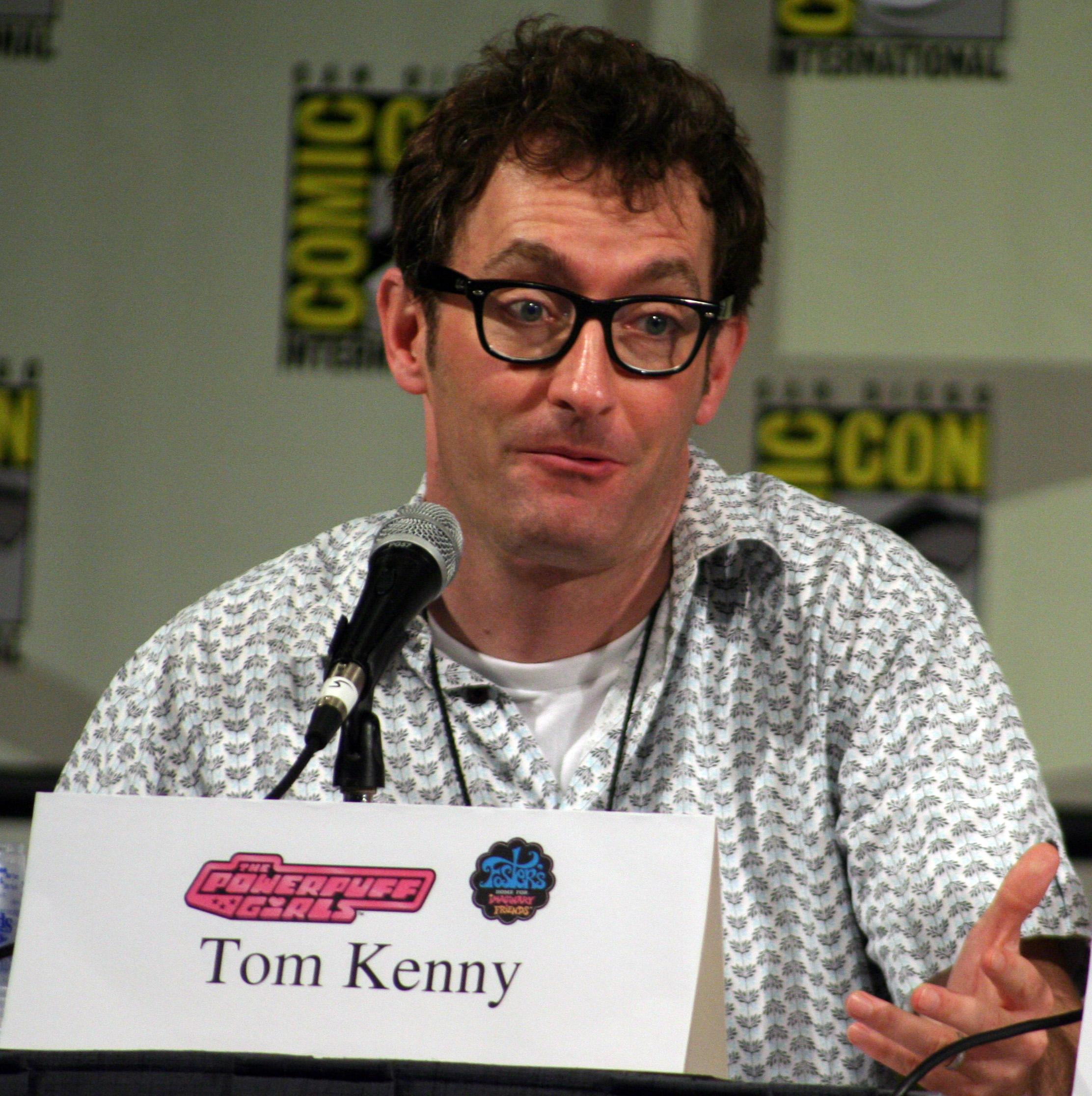
Tom Kenny has voiced several different characters throughout the series.

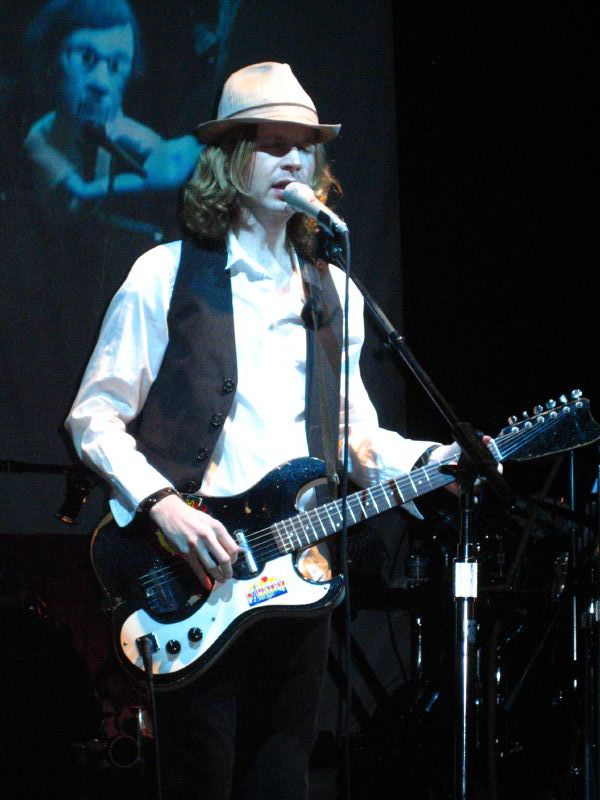
Beck is the only musician to have a major role in an episode.

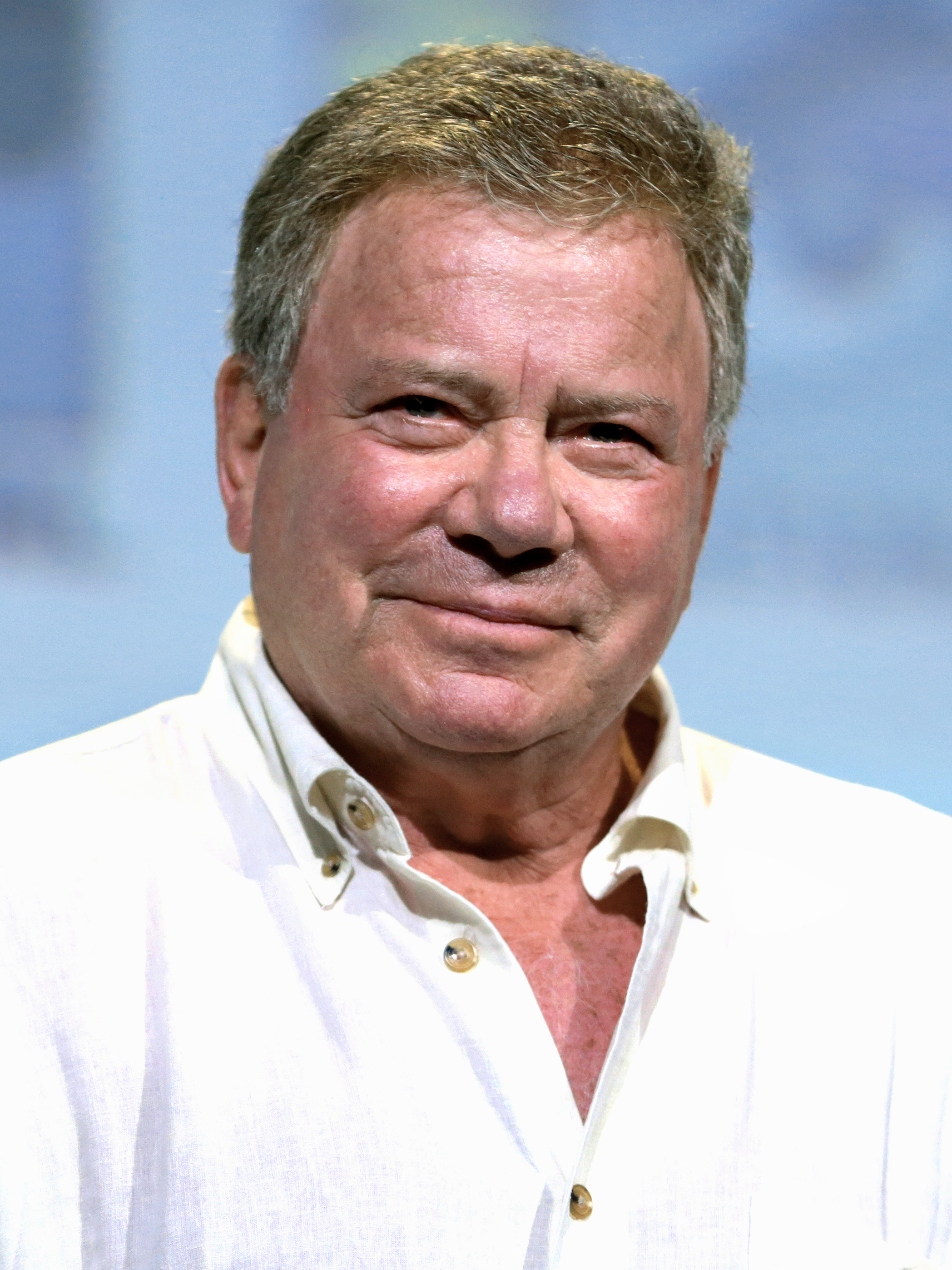
William Shatner guest stars as himself with the rest of the Star Trek cast in "Where No Fan Has Gone Before".

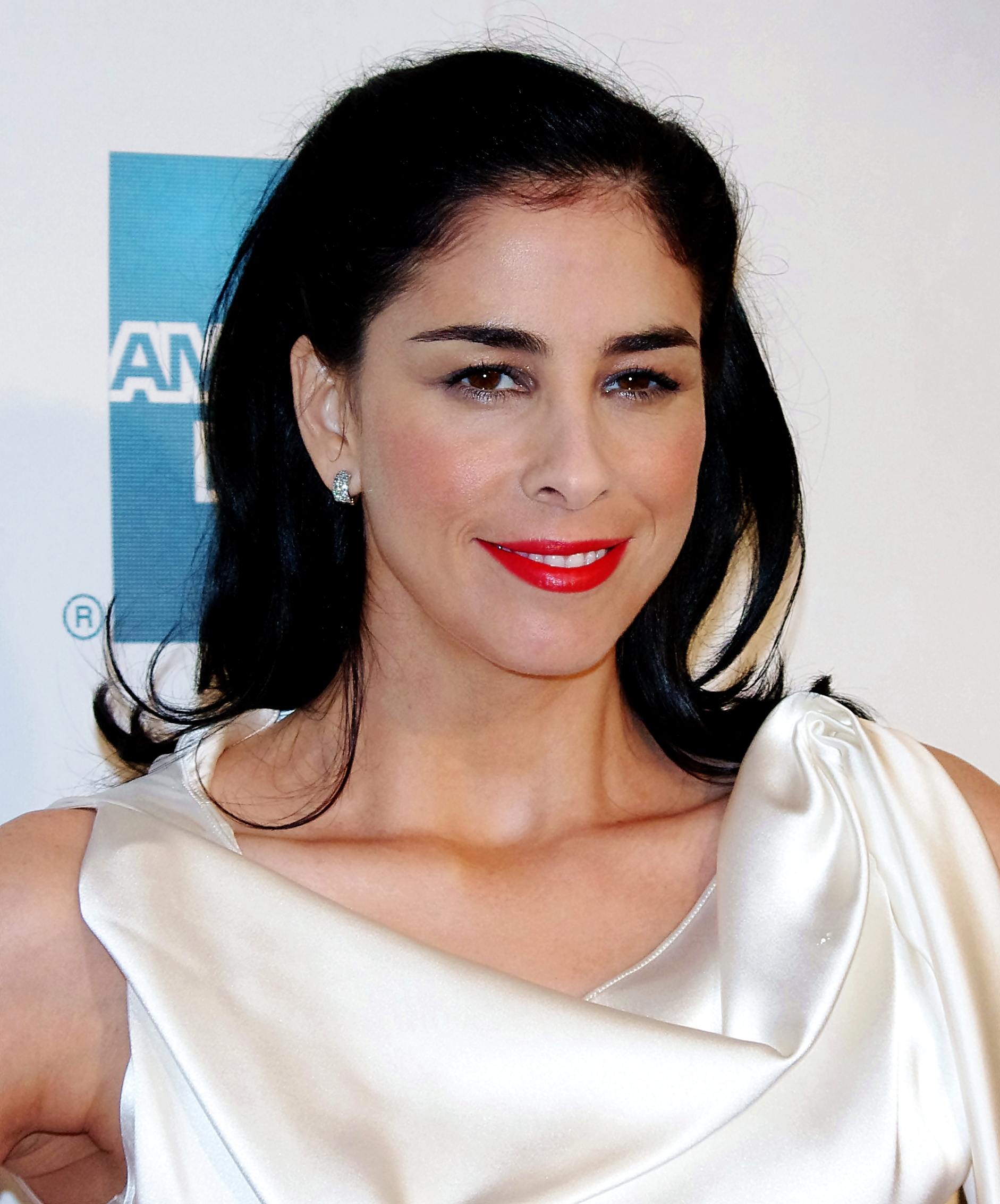
Sarah Silverman guest stars as Michelle, Fry's 20th century girlfriend in the episode "The Cryonic Woman" and the first DVD movie, Futurama: Bender's Big Score.

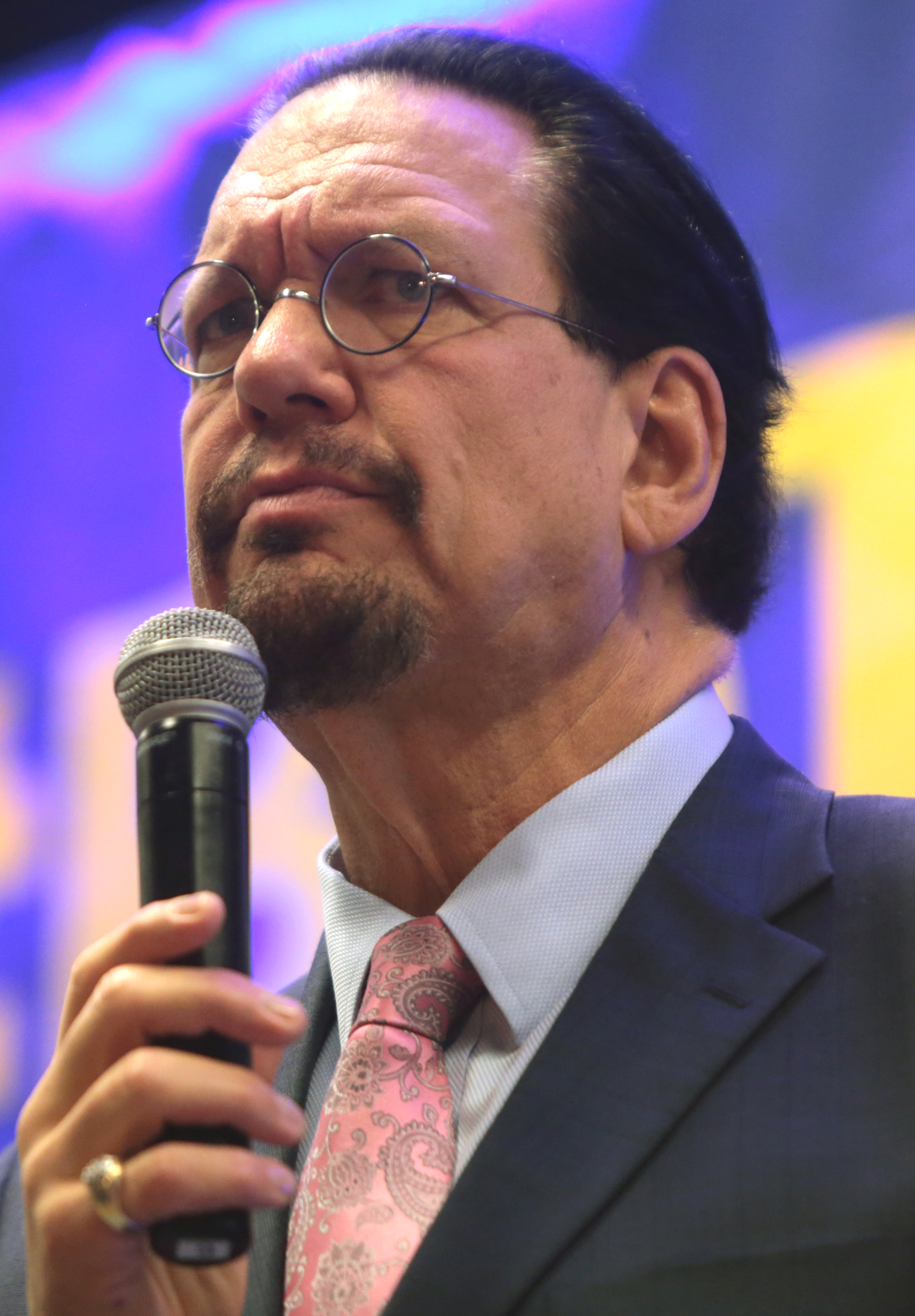
Penn Jillette guest stars in Futurama: Into the Wild Green Yonder.

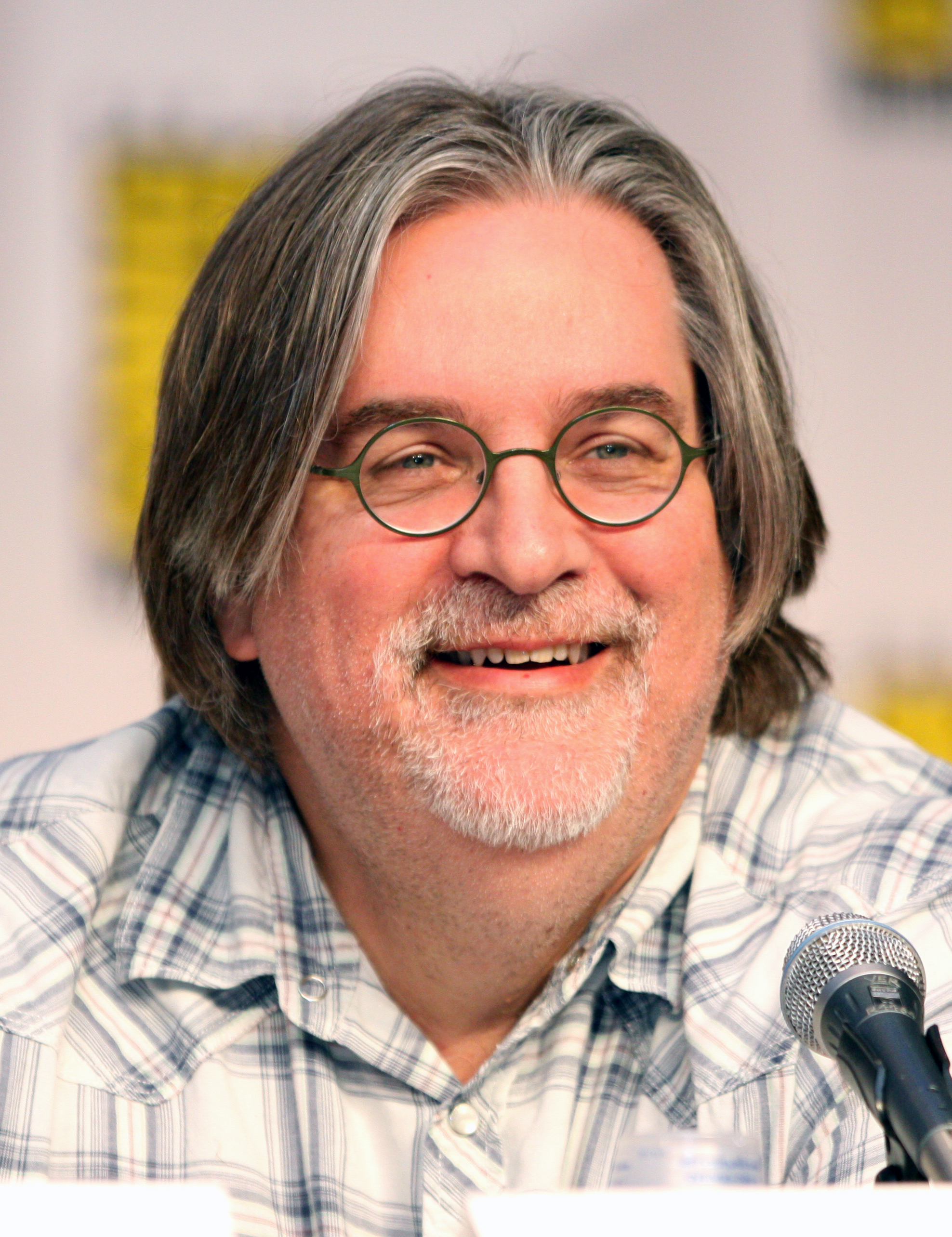
Series creator Matt Groening starred as himself for the first time in the show in "Lrrreconcilable Ndndifferences".

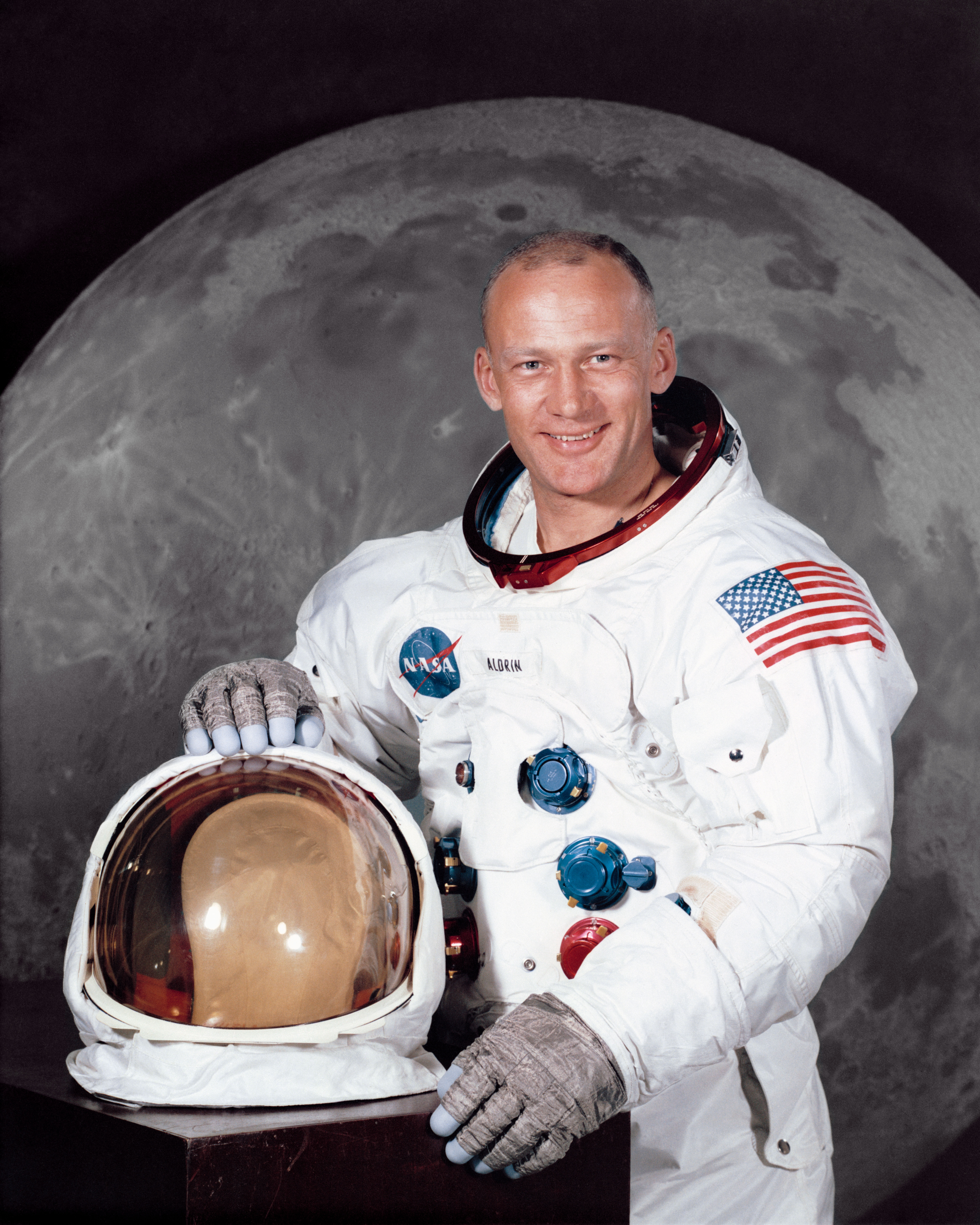
Astronaut Buzz Aldrin guest stars in "Cold Warriors".

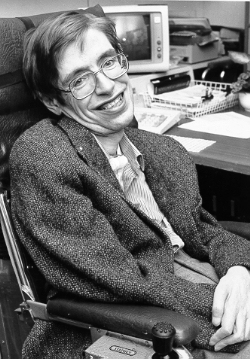
Stephen Hawking has guest starred multiple times throughout the series.

Season	Guest star	Role(s)	No.	Prod. code	Episode title
1	Dick Clark	Himself	001–101	1ACV01	"Space Pilot 3000"
1	Leonard Nimoy	Himself	001–101	1ACV01	"Space Pilot 3000"
1	David X. Cohen (uncredited)	Computer	004–104	1ACV04	"Love's Labours Lost in Space"
1	Pamela Anderson	Herself	006–106	1ACV06	"A Fishful of Dollars"
1	Nancy Cartwright (archival, uncredited)	Bart Simpson doll	008–108	1ACV08	"A Big Piece of Garbage"
1	Ron Popeil	Himself	008–108	1ACV08	"A Big Piece of Garbage"
1	Dan Castellaneta	Robot Devil	009–109	1ACV09	"Hell Is Other Robots"
1	Mike Diamond	Himself	009–109	1ACV09	"Hell Is Other Robots"
1	Adam Horovitz	Himself	009–109	1ACV09	"Hell Is Other Robots"
1	Pamela Anderson	Dixie	013–113	1ACV13	"Fry and the Slurm Factory"
2	Claudia Schiffer	Herself	016–203	2ACV03	"A Head in the Polls"
2	John Goodman	Robot Santa	017–204	2ACV04	"Xmas Story"
2	Conan O'Brien	Himself	017–204	2ACV04	"Xmas Story"
2	Bob Barker	Himself	019–206	2ACV06	"The Lesser of Two Evils"
2	Rich Little	Himself	021–208	2ACV08	"Raging Bender"
2	Russ Leatherman	Mr. Moviefone	021–208	2ACV08	"Raging Bender"
2	Nora Dunn	Morgan Proctor	024–211	2ACV11	"How Hermes Requisitioned His Groove Back"
2	Donovan	Himself	025–212	2ACV12	"The Deep South"
2	Parker Posey	Umbriel	025–212	2ACV12	"The Deep South"
2	Phil Hendrie	Free Waterfall Jr.	028–215	2ACV15	"The Problem with Popplers"
2	Al Gore	Himself	029–216	2ACV16	"Anthology of Interest I"
2	Gary Gygax	Himself	029–216	2ACV16	"Anthology of Interest I"
2	Stephen Hawking	Himself	029–216	2ACV16	"Anthology of Interest I"
2	Nichelle Nichols	Herself	029–216	2ACV16	"Anthology of Interest I"
2	Todd Susman	P.A. Announcer	030–217	2ACV17	"War Is the H-Word"
2	Pauly Shore	Himself	032–219	2ACV19	"The Cryonic Woman"
2	Sarah Silverman	Michelle	032–219	2ACV19	"The Cryonic Woman"
3	Bea Arthur	Femputer	033–301	3ACV01	"Amazon Women in the Mood"
3	Karen Maruyama	Amazonian	033–301	3ACV01	"Amazon Women in the Mood"
3	Suzie Plakson	Amazonian	033–301	3ACV01	"Amazon Women in the Mood"
3	Coolio	Kwanzaabot	035–303	3ACV03	"A Tale of Two Santas"
3	Phil Hendrie	Free Waterfall Sr. Old Man Waterfall	037–305	3ACV05	"The Birdbot of Ice-Catraz"
3	Jan Hooks	Angleyne	038–306	3ACV06	"Bendless Love"
3	Hank Azaria	Harold Zoid	040–308	3ACV08	"That's Lobstertainment!"
3	Beck	Himself	045–313	3ACV13	"Bendin' in the Wind"
3	Jeff Cesario	Marv Albert's head	046–314	3ACV14	"Time Keeps On Slippin'"
3	Lucy Liu	Herself	047–315	3ACV15	"I Dated a Robot"
3	Bob Uecker	Himself	048–316	3ACV16	"A Leela of Her Own"
3	Hank Aaron	Himself; Hank Aaron XXIV	048–316	3ACV16	"A Leela of Her Own"
4	Sigourney Weaver	Female Planet Express Ship	057–403	4ACV03	"Love and Rocket"
4	Lucy Liu	Herself	057–403	4ACV03	"Love and Rocket"
4	Phil Hendrie	Old Man Waterfall; Frida Waterfall	059–405	4ACV05	"A Taste of Freedom"
4	Al Gore	Himself	062–408	4ACV08	"Crimes of the Hot"
4	Bob Odenkirk	Chaz	064–410	4ACV10	"The Why of Fry"
4	Jonathan Frakes	Himself	065–411	4ACV11	"Where No Fan Has Gone Before"
4	Walter Koenig	Himself	065–411	4ACV11	"Where No Fan Has Gone Before"
4	Nichelle Nichols	Herself	065–411	4ACV11	"Where No Fan Has Gone Before"
4	Leonard Nimoy	Himself	065–411	4ACV11	"Where No Fan Has Gone Before"
4	William Shatner	Himself	065–411	4ACV11	"Where No Fan Has Gone Before"
4	George Takei	Himself	065–411	4ACV11	"Where No Fan Has Gone Before"
4	Roseanne Barr	Herself	070–416	4ACV16	"Three Hundred Big Boys"
4	Dan Castellaneta	Robot Devil; Commercial Snail	072–418	4ACV18	"The Devil's Hands Are Idle Playthings"
5	Al Gore	Himself	074–502	5ACV02	"Bender's Big Score: Part 2"
5	Tom Kenny	Yancy Fry Jr.	074–502	5ACV02	"Bender's Big Score: Part 2"
5	Sarah Silverman	Michelle	074–502	5ACV02	"Bender's Big Score: Part 2"
5	Coolio	Kwanzaabot	076–504	5ACV04	"Bender's Big Score: Part 4"
5	Al Gore	Himself	076–504	5ACV04	"Bender's Big Score: Part 4"
5	Mark Hamill	Chanukah Zombie	076–504	5ACV04	"Bender's Big Score: Part 4"
5	Brittany Murphy	Colleen O'Hallahan	077–505	5ACV05	"The Beast with a Billion Backs: Part 1"
5	Stephen Hawking	Himself	077–505	5ACV05	"The Beast with a Billion Backs: Part 1"
5	Brittany Murphy	Colleen O'Hallahan	078–506	5ACV06	"The Beast with a Billion Backs: Part 2"
5	David Cross	Yivo	079–507	5ACV07	"The Beast with a Billion Backs: Part 3"
5	Brittany Murphy	Colleen O'Hallahan	079–507	5ACV07	"The Beast with a Billion Backs: Part 3"
5	Dan Castellaneta	Robot Devil	080–508	5ACV08	"The Beast with a Billion Backs: Part 4"
5	David Cross	Yivo	080–508	5ACV08	"The Beast with a Billion Backs: Part 4"
5	Brittany Murphy	Colleen O'Hallahan	080–508	5ACV08	"The Beast with a Billion Backs: Part 4"
5	Rich Little	Himself	081–509	5ACV09	"Bender's Game: Part 1"
5	George Takei	Himself	081–509	5ACV09	"Bender's Game: Part 1"
5	Gary Gygax (archival)	Himself	084–512	5ACV12	"Bender's Game: Part 4"
5	Phil Hendrie	Frida Waterfall; Hutch Waterfall	085–513	5ACV13	"Into the Wild Green Yonder: Part 1"
5	Penn Jillette	Himself	085–513	5ACV13	"Into the Wild Green Yonder: Part 1"
5	Seth MacFarlane	Mars Vegas Singer	085–513	5ACV13	"Into the Wild Green Yonder: Part 1"
5	Teller (credited although he has no speaking role)	Himself	085–513	5ACV13	"Into the Wild Green Yonder: Part 1"
5	Phil Hendrie	Frida Waterfall; Hutch Waterfall	086–514	5ACV14	"Into the Wild Green Yonder: Part 2"
5	Phil Hendrie	Frida Waterfall; Hutch Waterfall	087–515	5ACV15	"Into the Wild Green Yonder: Part 3"
5	Snoop Dogg	Himself	088–516	5ACV16	"Into the Wild Green Yonder: Part 4"
5	Phil Hendrie	Frida Waterfall; The Encyclopod	088–516	5ACV16	"Into the Wild Green Yonder: Part 4"
6	Chris Elliott	V-Giny	090–602	6ACV02	"In-A-Gadda-Da-Leela"
6	Craig Ferguson	Susan Boil	091–603	6ACV03	"Attack of the Killer App"
6	George Takei	Himself	092–604	6ACV04	"Proposition Infinity"
6	Sergio Aragonés	Himself	099–611	6ACV11	"Lrrreconcilable Ndndifferences"
6	David X. Cohen	Himself	099–611	6ACV11	"Lrrreconcilable Ndndifferences"
6	Matt Groening	Himself	099–611	6ACV11	"Lrrreconcilable Ndndifferences"
6	Katee Sackhoff	Grrrl	099–611	6ACV11	"Lrrreconcilable Ndndifferences"
6	Mark Mothersbaugh	Himself	100–612	6ACV12	"The Mutants Are Revolting"
6	Coolio	Kwanzaabot	101–613	6ACV13	"The Futurama Holiday Spectacular"
6	Al Gore	Himself	101–613	6ACV13	"The Futurama Holiday Spectacular"
6	Dan Vebber	Norwegian Seed Guard	101–613	6ACV13	"The Futurama Holiday Spectacular"
6	Patton Oswalt	Giant Unattractive Monster	105–617	6ACV17	"Benderama"
6	Dan Castellaneta	Robot Devil	107–619	6ACV19	"Ghost in the Machines"
6	Tom Kenny	Abner Doubledeal	109–621	6ACV21	"Yo Leela Leela"
6	Eric Rogers (uncredited)	Popular Slut Club Singer	109–621	6ACV21	"Yo Leela Leela"
6	Buzz Aldrin	Himself	112–624	6ACV24	"Cold Warriors"
6	Tom Kenny	Yancy Fry Jr.	112–624	6ACV24	"Cold Warriors"
6	Stephen Hawking	Himself	114–626	6ACV26	"Reincarnation"
7	Wanda Sykes	Bev	115–701	7ACV01	"The Bots and the Bees"
7	George Takei	Himself	119–705	7ACV05	"Zapp Dingbat"
7	Tom Kenny	Abner Doubledeal	120–706	7ACV06	"The Butterjunk Effect"
7	Jill Talley	Trainer	120–706	7ACV06	"The Butterjunk Effect"
7	Dan Castellaneta	Robot Devil	121–707	7ACV07	"The Six Million Dollar Mon"
7	Tom Kenny	Robot	123–709	7ACV09	"Free Will Hunting"
7	Estelle Harris	Velma Farnsworth	124–710	7ACV10	"Near-Death Wish"
7	Patrick Stewart	Fox Huntmaster	125–711	7ACV11	"31st Century Fox"
7	Larry Bird	Himself	133–719	7ACV19	"Saturday Morning Fun Pit"
7	George Takei	Himself	133–719	7ACV19	"Saturday Morning Fun Pit"
7	Dan Castellaneta	Robot Devil	134–720	7ACV20	"Calculon 2.0"
7	Robert Wagner	Himself	134–720	7ACV20	"Calculon 2.0"
7	Burt Ward	Himself	136–722	7ACV22	"Leela and the Genestalk"
7	Adam West	Himself	136–722	7ACV22	"Leela and the Genestalk"
7	Tom Kenny	Yancy Fry Jr.	137–723	7ACV23	"Game of Tones"
7	Seth MacFarlane	Seymour	137–723	7ACV23	"Game of Tones"
7	Sarah Silverman	Michelle	137–723	7ACV23	"Game of Tones"
7	Emilia Clarke	Marianne	139–725	7ACV25	"Stench and Stenchibility"
7	Tara Strong	Tonya	139–725	7ACV25	"Stench and Stenchibility"
8	Dan Castellaneta	Robot Devil	141–801	8ACV01	"The Impossible Stream"
8	Brad Norman	PC	141–801	8ACV01	"The Impossible Stream"
8	Patric M. Verrone	All My Circuits Writer	141–801	8ACV01	"The Impossible Stream"
8	Ego Nwodim	Dung Beetle Shaman	144–804	8ACV04	"Parasites Regained"
8	Kyle MacLachlan	Dung Beetle Majordomo	144–804	8ACV04	"Parasites Regained"
8	Al Gore	Himself	145–805	8ACV05	"Related to Items You've Viewed"
8	Coolio	Kwanzaabot	146–806	8ACV06	"I Know What You Did Next Xmas"
8	Mark Hamill	Chanukah Zombie	146–806	8ACV06	"I Know What You Did Next Xmas"
8	Bill Nye	Himself	147–807	8ACV07	"Rage Against the Vaccine"
8	Kathy Griffin	Captain Cranky	148–808	8ACV08	"Zapp Gets Canceled"
9	Danny Trejo	Doblando	151–901	9ACV01	"The One Amigo"
9	Renée Victor	Abuelatron; Pottery Bot	151–901	9ACV01	"The One Amigo"
9	Carlos Alazraqui	Referee Bot	151–901	9ACV01	"The One Amigo"
9	Gabriel Romero	Ancient Emperor	151–901	9ACV01	"The One Amigo"
9	Diana Elizabeth Torres	Ancient Empress; Bender's Niece	151–901	9ACV01	"The One Amigo"
9	Ana Ortiz	Marquita	154–904	9ACV04	"Beauty and the Bug"
9	Bill Nye	Himself	156–906	9ACV06	"Attack of the Clothes"
9	Tim Gunn	Himself	156–906	9ACV06	"Attack of the Clothes"
9	Aleque Reid	Umbriel	156–906	9ACV06	"Attack of the Clothes"
9	Kyle MacLachlan	Himself	157–907	9ACV07	"Planet Espresso"
9	Zuri Washington	Jamaican Woman	157–907	9ACV07	"Planet Espresso"
9	LeVar Burton	Himself	159–909	9ACV09	"The Futurama Mystery Liberry"
9	Neil deGrasse Tyson	Himself	159–909	9ACV09	"The Futurama Mystery Liberry"
10	Dan Castellaneta	Robot Devil	161–1001	AACV01	"Destroy Tall Monsters"
10	Guillermo del Toro	Himself	161–1001	AACV01	"Destroy Tall Monsters"
10	Victor Wembanyama	Himself	161–1001	AACV01	"Destroy Tall Monsters"
10	Bill Nye	Himself	162–1002	AACV02	"The World is Hot Enough"
10	Kenny G	Himself	163–1003	AACV03	"Fifty Shades of Green"
10	Ravi Patel	Ipgee	163–1003	AACV03	"Fifty Shades of Green"
10	Danica McKellar	Herself	164–1004	AACV04	"The Numberland Gap"
10	Phil Hendrie	Grovestick Waterfall; Bliss Waterfall; Waterfall Kids	165–1005	AACV05	"Scared Screenless"
10	Maria Bamford	Jambone	169–1009	AACV09	"The Trouble with Truffles"
11	Renée Victor	Abuelatron	175-1105	BACV05	"Catfish Hunter"
11	Caitlin Gallogly	Marianne	176-1106	BACV06	"Late Bloomers"
11	George Takei	Himself	177-1107	BACV07	"Lord Nibbler in the Nothingverse"
11	Abbi Jacobson	Princess Bean	179-1109	BACV09	"A New New York Yankee in King Elfo's Court"
11	Eric André	Luci; Sir Pendergast	179-1109	BACV09	"A New New York Yankee in King Elfo's Court"
11	Nat Faxon	Elfo	179-1109	BACV09	"A New New York Yankee in King Elfo's Court"
11	Sharon Horgan	Queen Dagmar	179-1109	BACV09	"A New New York Yankee in King Elfo's Court"
11	Rich Fulcher	Sir Turbish	179-1109	BACV09	"A New New York Yankee in King Elfo's Court"
11	Lucy Montgomery	Bunty	179-1109	BACV09	"A New New York Yankee in King Elfo's Court"

== Additional ==
Other guest star appearances in Futurama media. Some celebrity guest characters are included in Futurama: Worlds of Tomorrow, using audio lifted directly from the show. Only instances where new dialogue was recorded are included here.

Project title	Guest star	Role(s)
"Radiorama"	Chris Hardwick	Klaxxon Himself
Futurama: Worlds of Tomorrow	George Takei	Himself
Futurama: Worlds of Tomorrow	Neil deGrasse Tyson	Himself
Futurama: Worlds of Tomorrow	Chris Hardwick	Himself
Futurama: Worlds of Tomorrow	Bill Nye the Science Guy	Himself
Futurama: Worlds of Tomorrow	Stephen Hawking	Himself
