= Futurama season 10 =

Futurama
- Season 10
- Promotional poster
- Showrunner: David X. Cohen
- No. of episodes: 10

Release
- Original network: Hulu
- Original release: September 15, 2025

Season chronology
- ← Previous; Season 9 Next → Season 11

The tenth production season of Futurama consists of ten episodes. It premiered with all ten episodes on Hulu in the United States on September 15, 2025. This season also aired back to back episodes weekly on FXX starting September 15, differing to the release strategy of the previous two Hulu seasons.

This season has alternatively been titled the tenth season (production) and the thirteenth season (broadcast). This list follows the previous season box sets, which feature the episodes in the original, intended production season order, ignoring the order of broadcast.

== Cast and characters ==
=== Regular ===
- Billy West as Philip J. Fry, Professor Farnsworth, Zoidberg, Zapp Brannigan, Smitty, Richard Nixon's Head, Wailing Fungus
- Katey Sagal as Turanga Leela
- John DiMaggio as Bender, Randy, Sal, Joey Mousepad, Igner, Robot Santa, Elzar
- Tress MacNeille as Linda, Barbot, Monique, Petunia, Mom, Turanga Munda, Leela's Grandmother, Vyolet, Gypsy-Bot, The Grand Midwife, Blazucchi, Dr. Judith, Hattie McDoogal
- Maurice LaMarche as Hedonismbot, Calculon, Morbo, Fishy Joe, Walt, Kif Kroker, Axl, Human-horn dealer, Don Cunningham, The Borax Kid, The Space Pope, Blecch, The Hyperchicken, Donbot, Clamps, Headless Clone of Agnew
- Lauren Tom as Amy Wong, Ruth, Cyndi Lauper's Head, Mandy, Newt
- Phil LaMarr as Hermes Conrad, Dwight Conrad, Bubblegum Tate, Preacherbot
- David Herman as Roberto, Scruffy, Mayor Poopenmeyer, Bear Biologist, Dr. Banjo, Dr. Wernstrom, Larry, Turanga Morris, Terry, Branch Woodsman, Dr. Tenderman, Father Changstein el-Gamahl, Bureaucrates, Slim Gluttonstein

=== Recurring ===
- Dee Bradley Baker as Georg Cantor, Snipe, Yogurt Creature
- Dawnn Lewis as LaBarbara Conrad, Vlogger
- Kevin Michael Richardson as URL, Barbados Slim
- Kath Soucie as Cubert Farnsworth
- Frank Welker as Nibbler, Various Animals

=== Special guest stars ===
- Dan Castellaneta as The Robot Devil
- Guillermo del Toro as Himself
- Victor Wembanyama as Himself
- Bill Nye as Himself
- Kenny G as Himself
- Ravi Patel as Ipji
- Danica McKellar as Herself
- Phil Hendrie as Groovestick Waterfall, Bliss Waterfall, Waterfall Offspring
- Maria Bamford as Jambone

== Episodes ==
No. overall	No. in season	Title	Directed by	Written by	Original release date	Prod. code
161	1	"Destroy Tall Monsters"	Ira Sherak	David X. Cohen	September 15, 2025	AACV01
After getting rejected for being too short by Barbot, a female robot celebrity, Bender feels insecure about his height and takes pills that make him taller. Barbot falls in love with Bender's new height, but soon falls in love with even taller things, leading Bender to take even more pills until he becomes a rampaging giant. The Planet Express crew are tasked with stopping giant Bender wreaking havoc on the city.
162	2	"The World Is Hot Enough"	Edmund Fong	Maiya Williams	September 15, 2025	AACV02
After taking measurements in the Arctic, Professor Farnsworth finds that global warming is destroying the planet at a rapid rate. He presents his data at an environmental conference, and after much opposition, his findings are ultimately accepted and result in a plan to prevent catastrophe by triggering a volcanic explosion at Mount Vesuvius to block sunlight from heating the Earth further. Meanwhile, Fry adopts two supposedly orphaned polar bear cubs.
163	3	"Fifty Shades of Green"	Crystal Chesney-Thompson	Ariel Ladensohn	September 15, 2025	AACV03
Fry throws a new year's anniversary to show Leela his love for her, but in doing so, kills Leela's houseplant, which strains their relationship. To check whether the relationship is meant to be, the crew obtains a contraband device that shows people their soulmate. While the device confirms that Fry's soulmate is Leela, conversely, it also claims that Leela's soulmate is a botanist in Central Park, whom Fry goes to confront.
164	4	"The Numberland Gap"	Andrew Han	Ken Walsh	September 15, 2025	AACV04
Bender's antenna picks up a mysterious numbers station radio broadcast. Fry, meanwhile, takes up art and starts doing paint by number paintings. Amy, speculating a connection between the two, converts the numbers broadcast into a paint-by-numbers image, which turns out to be a schematic for a machine that opens a portal into the world of numbers. After exploring this new world, Professor Farnsworth chooses to stay, and soon meets an imprisoned Georg Cantor, who it turns out had sent the broadcast. The two have to use mathematics to escape the number world. Meanwhile, back in the real world, Fry's paintings are entered into an art competition.
165	5	"Scared Screenless"	Dwayne Carey-Hill	Bill Odenkirk	September 15, 2025	AACV05
Having tired of their phone addiction, the Professor, Hermes, and Kif send Cubert, Dwight, Axl, and Bender to a "scared screenless" camp headed by Zapp. While their kids are away, the guys have a guys' night out and the ladies get drunk at a bar. At the camp, the boys struggle to get by without their devices, and after Zapp falls asleep, they get them back, using Bender as a Wi-Fi receiver. The planet turns out to be inhabited by anarcho-primitivist hippies, who blame the boys' electronic wizardry for the disappearance of sun during an eclipse. The hippies attack the boys using primitive weaponry, and the boys need to find a way to contact their parents for help.
166	6	"Wicked Human"	Ira Sherak	Eric Horsted	September 15, 2025	AACV06
When people start ascending into the sky, Professor Farnsworth denies that it could be the Rapture, and tries to seek out a scientific explanation, leading him to unwittingly form his own science-based cult. After New New York's population dwindles, and all his attempts at finding a scientific explanation fail, he has a crisis of faith and finally submits to a belief in a higher power. Eventually he too ascends into the sky, where he uncovers the true cause of the ascensions.
167	7	"Murderoni"	Edmund Fong	Cody Ziglar	September 15, 2025	AACV07
In a parody of the Pizzagate conspiracy theory, a local pizzeria's owners find themselves the victims of a conspiracy theory accusing them of making their pepperoni out of human babies in the basement of their restaurant. To prove the restaurant owners' innocence, Hermes and his son venture deep into the labyrinthine archives of the Central Bureaucracy to locate ancient building plans that would prove the restaurant doesn't have a basement.
168	8	"Crab Splatter"	Crystal Chesney-Thompson	Shirin Najafi	September 15, 2025	AACV08
A meteorite from Zoidberg's home planet destroys Amy and Kif's neighbors' home, and they move into Zoidberg's dumpster. Zoidberg is forced to move in with Leela's parents in the sewer, who quickly take a liking to him and end up adopting him as their son. Leela is disgusted at having Zoidberg as a step-brother, until a rare medical condition forms an unlikely bond between the two.
169	9	"The Trouble with Truffles"	Andrew Han	David A. Goodman	September 15, 2025	AACV09
When Fry can't pay his restaurant bill due to the exorbitant price of the truffles in the meal, the robot mafia covers his bill, in exchange for a favor. After learning of their high price, Bender seeks to get rich in the truffle asteroid belt with the help of a talking truffle hog. When Bender realizes he has no chance competing against the other professional truffle hunters, he sets his sights on a deadly truffle asteroid that no truffle hunter has ever returned from.
170	10	"The White Hole"	Peter Avanzino	Patric M. Verrone	September 15, 2025	AACV10
A white hole appears over New New York and offers an invitation for a crew to come witness the birth of a new universe. However, due to time dilation, the journey into the white hole will take 10 million years, relativistically. The Planet Express crew is chosen to make the journey, cryogenically frozen to stop them from rapidly aging, while short-lived clones of the crew get 3D printed on demand to perform routine maintenance of the ship. As the 10 million year journey nears its end, the clones rebel when they are given their final task to unfreeze the real crew.

== Production ==
=== Development ===
In November 2023, Futurama was renewed by Hulu for two more seasons, which will air through 2026.

== Release ==
The season premiered on September 15, 2025, on Hulu in the United States and on Disney+ internationally on the same day, with two new episodes airing every Monday on FXX in the United States at 8pm.

== Reception ==
=== Ratings ===
Futurama premiered on FXX on September 15, 2025. The premiere episode recorded approximately 230,000 viewers (P2+) with a 0.03% rating and 64,000 household viewers (0.05 rating). As of October 14, the program had 60,000 viewers (0.02% rating), reflecting an 18% decrease from the 73,000 viewers reported on October 13, 2025. On October 14, household viewership was 51,500 (0.04 rating), with 13,500 viewers in the 18–49 demographic (0.01 rating) and 25,000 in the 25–54 demographic (0.02 rating). Since its debut, the program's P2+ ratings have ranged between 0.02% and 0.03%, with daily viewership figures between 60,000 and 98,000. In December 2025, Disney announced that Futurama was among the television series to surpass one billion hours streamed on Disney+ in 2025.
