= Futurama season 8 =

8th season of Futurama

Futurama
- Season 8
- Promotional poster
- Showrunner: David X. Cohen
- No. of episodes: 10

Release
- Original network: Hulu
- Original release: July 24 – September 25, 2023

Season chronology
- ← Previous; Season 7 Next → Season 9

The eighth season of Futurama consisted of ten episodes. It premiered on Hulu in the United States on July 24, 2023. Although the seventh season was intended to be the final season, having concluded in September 2013 on their previous network Comedy Central, Hulu greenlit an eighth season in February 2022. All of the main voice cast returned, including John DiMaggio after he spent a month in negotiations to sign a new deal with Disney, which assumed the rights to the series, following their acquisition of 21st Century Fox in March 2019.

This season has alternatively been titled the eighth season (production), and the eleventh season (broadcast). This list follows the previous season box sets, which feature the episodes in the original, intended production season order, ignoring the order of broadcast.

== Cast and characters ==
=== Regular ===
- Billy West as Philip J. Fry, Professor Farnsworth, Zoidberg, Zapp Brannigan, Humorbot 5.0, Richard Nixon's Head, Hydroponic farmer, Smitty, Judge Ron Whitey
- Katey Sagal as Turanga Leela Fry
- John DiMaggio as Bender, Elzar, Joey Mousepad, Igner, Robot Santa, Sal, Randy
- Tress MacNeille as Mom, Monique, Linda, The Grand Midwife, Petunia, Tinny Tim, Spotty Teen Robot, Turanga Munda, Leela's Grandmother, Hattie McDoogal, Ndnd, Gypsy-Bot, Glab
- Maurice LaMarche as Morbo, H.G. Blob, Calculon, Kif Kroker, Axl Kroker, The Borax Kid, Clamps, Donbot, Walt, The Crushinator, Hedonismbot, Lrrr, Headless Clone of Agnew, The Hyperchicken
- Lauren Tom as Amy Kroker (née Wong), Inez Wong, Jrrr, Newt and Mandy Kroker
- Phil LaMarr as Hermes Conrad, Dwight Conrad, Reverend Preacherbot
- David Herman as Scruffy, Bear Biologist, Roberto, Larry, Turanga Morris, Mayor Poopenmeyer, Dr. Wernstrom, Dr. Banjo, Colonel Merman, Terry

=== Recurring ===
- Feodor Chin as Leo Wong, Scoop Chang
- Dawnn Lewis as LaBarbara Conrad
- Kevin Michael Richardson as URL, Barbados Slim
- Kath Soucie as Cubert Farnsworth
- Frank Welker as Nibbler, various animals

=== Special guest stars ===
- Dan Castellaneta as the Robot Devil
- Cara Delevingne as Makeup Robot
- Ego Nwodim as Dung Beetle Shaman
- Kyle MacLachlan as Dung Beetle Majordomo
- Al Gore as himself
- Coolio as Kwanzaabot
- Mark Hamill as Chanukah Zombie
- Bill Nye as himself
- Kathy Griffin as Captain Cranky

== Episodes ==
No. overall	No. in season	Title	Directed by	Written by	Original release date	Prod. code
141	1	"The Impossible Stream"	Peter Avanzino	Patric M. Verrone	July 24, 2023	8ACV01
Set after the events of the last episode, the universe is frozen in time. Professor Farnsworth emerges from a time warp and presses the time button to reboot the universe to the moment time stood still. After finding out that everyone has been frozen for 10 years, Fry realizes he has not accomplished anything in his whole life. Desiring a life goal to fulfill with a support of Leela, Fry decides to watch every TV series in existence which leads to the revival of All My Circuits and the resurrection of Calculon.
142	2	"Children of a Lesser Bog"	Edmund Fong	Eric Horsted	July 31, 2023	8ACV02
After Amy tries Bender's homemade candy he made for Fry, the adhesiveness pulls out two of her teeth. As Amy makes an appointment to have her teeth fixed, her calendar reminds her that it has been twenty years since Kif gave birth after being impregnated by Leela, and that it is time for the children to return to shore. Amy and Kif attempt to balance parenting their three new children with Kif's job as Zapp Brannigan's lieutenant. When an overwhelmed Amy asks Leela to babysit the kids, she worries they might be taking a liking to their biological parent instead of her. But instead Amy has passed the challenge and therefore she (not Leela) is the "true" biological mother of Axl, Mandy and Newt since she really cared for her children.
143	3	"How the West Was 1010001" (Note: "1010001" is binary for "81," which is the atomic number of thallium)	James Kim	Ken Keeler (Note: Credited as "Nona di Spargement")	August 7, 2023	8ACV03
Professor Farnsworth is indebted to the robot mafia after losing all his money in Bitcoin. The Planet Express crew heads to Doge City, a town that is forced to exist as if it were the Old West due to cryptocurrency mining consuming all the electricity. While in search of thallium to sell to the town's local crypto miners, the crew take on various odd jobs to earn income.
144	4	"Parasites Regained"	Corey Barnes	Maiya Williams	August 14, 2023	8ACV04
The crew realize that Nibbler's litter box is infested with parasitic worms that are eating his intelligence. They shrink down and encounter a sandy world inside the litter box with many interconnected species that utilize the sands' natural byproduct "glitter" to reveal the nature of the universe. Though Nibbler ultimately wishes to succumb to the natural order of this universe and become dumb for their sake, Leela determines that the worms can help Nibbler remain intelligent if they eradicate the even smaller mites that are secretly parasitizing them.
145	5	"Related to Items You've Viewed"	Andrew Han	David A. Goodman	August 21, 2023	8ACV05
Leela moves in with Fry, making Bender so jealous that he quits Planet Express and moves to work on the Moon in the warehouse of Momazon, an immense online shopping and delivery company owned by Mom. The robot employees work non-stop shifts and Leela and Fry (arguing on how to renovate their apartment) receive a message from Bender begging to be rescued. The warehouse becomes self-aware and begins expanding like a Dyson sphere. Though Leela, and Fry manage to rescue Bender, and presumably the other robots break free, the warehouse soon engulfs the entire Earth, expanding until it contains the entire universe, but not to other universes beyond. Though the crew is concerned that everything now exists within the Momazon warehouse, they are mollified by the retail convenience. Bender's experience working with the Momazon "team" makes him thrilled to be a third wheel to Leela and Fry in their home.
146	6	"I Know What You Did Next Xmas"	Crystal Chesney-Thompson	Ariel Ladensohn	August 28, 2023	8ACV06
Professor Farnsworth, in his newly revised time machine (unlike his last one, this time machine can go both forwards and backwards in time), decides to go back in time and fix Robot Santa so that he does not become murderous. He believes he is successful, but Bender and Zoidberg are depressed because this means that everyone will celebrate Christmas with loved ones which the two of them do not have. They use the time machine to kidnap Robot Santa, but accidentally kill him. When everyone realizes that Bender and Zoidberg are still by themselves, they visit them only for a fully-fixed Robot Santa to arrive and attack. In a twist, Farnsworth realizes that he inadvertently was the one who made Robot Santa evil. In a second twist, Bender and Zoidberg discover that the time where they kidnapped Robot Santa from was not the past but from the current Christmas, effectively being the ones who literally saved Christmas.
147	7	"Rage Against the Vaccine"	Edmund Fong	Cody Ziglar	September 4, 2023	8ACV07
After coming out of a third COVID lockdown, Earth is beset by a new virus, Explovid-23, that causes and is transmitted by rage. Earth is additionally affected by the new pandemic when Omicronians launch a disinformation campaign to cause Earthlings to fight against one another over vaccine safety so they can invade. Despite Professor Farnsworth's derision, Hermes believes that the virus can be defeated with voodoo and enlists the help of Barbados Slim and LaBarbara. LaBarbara develops a voodoo potion that will trick the body's cells into thinking it is infected with Explovid-23 and thus produce antibodies. The potion works and Farnsworth apologizes to Hermes, who asserts that "any sufficiently advanced magic is indistinguishable from science."
148	8	"Zapp Gets Canceled"	James Kim	Shirin Najafi	September 11, 2023	8ACV08
Having had enough of his physical, mental, and sexual abuse, Kif reports Zapp Brannigan who is canceled by the DOOP Federation and forced to undergo emotional training under Dr. Kind who puts him and two other abusive captains (a robot who's been canceled because of indecent exposure and a surly, female human captain who hurls food and insults her subordinates) through the wringer. Leela, feeling she is at a dead end in her career, is hired to be the new captain of the Nimbus, bringing Fry and Bender along, and takes the crew to a planet inhabited by balloon-like people who greet others by groping them. Leela learns that the "peace talks" are actually a way to siphon their air, which makes her uncomfortable. Dr. Kind is revealed to be another canceled captain who threatens to poison the air with a durian, an Earth fruit known for its rancid odor. Leela and Zapp both refuse to shoot at Dr. Kind (who was surrounded by the balloon people) and DOOP's commander gives access to Dr. Kind who launches ship missiles at himself. Leela prevents the durian from contaminating the Nimbus' air thus saving the planet. Zapp is reinstated as the captain of the Nimbus, while Leela is discharged (after having been granted medal of valor) and returns to Planet Express, but with a better appreciation for her job.
149	9	"The Prince and the Product"	Corey Barnes	Ari Kaplan & Eric Kaplan	September 18, 2023	8ACV09
On a delivery, Leela falls in love with the Prince of Space, but his father forbids them to wed. Wanting Leela to be happy, Fry volunteers to duel the King for her right to wed the prince. In the end, Leela accidentally kills the Prince, and later learns that her strange behavior was the result of a "science spell" while Fry and Leela were still engaged to be married. Throughout the episode, advertisements depict the Planet Express crew as different toys: As a wind-up toy, Fry discovers he is dying due to his clockwork key slowly winding down during his time in the cryogenic freezer.; In a world of Round Wheels cars, citizens are being murdered not long after viewing a creepy video followed by a phone call about their expired warranty.; Rubber duck Fry falls in love with weeble Leela, but their love is forbidden by their respective societies.
150	10	"All the Way Down"	Ira Sherak	David X. Cohen	September 25, 2023	8ACV10
Professor Farnsworth creates a simulation of their universe, represented as low-res voxel models, which causes the Planet Express crew to wonder if they are living in a simulation. When Amy inadvertently causes Bender to realize that he is technically simulated, he asks Farnsworth to promise not to inform their simulations that they are not real. They create a hydroelectric generator to keep the supercomputer powered, allowing them to increase the resolution so the simulation looks more realistic, but the simulations begin to question their existence and decide to test it by creating an astronomical event so complex the supercomputer would not be able to simulate it smoothly. They proceed to make a magnetar explode to see if it makes glitches in the simulation. Bender sends his consciousness down to inform them that they are fake, which Farnsworth warns him is a one-way trip. Bender ultimately decides not to tell them, as the simulations have accepted that they do not care what the answer is as long as they continue to feel. Bender then apparently somehow reboots; implied to in fact be another Bender from a higher level of simulation, and helps Farnsworth improve the generator. Farnsworth reduces the supercomputer's processing speed, causing time to slow down to a crawl within the simulation so it can keep running, though the simulation characters will not know the difference.

== Production ==
=== Development ===
In February 2022, Hulu revived the series with a 20-episode order expected to premiere in 2023. In August 2022, the titles of the first 10 episodes were announced by Hulu, and by November 2022, the production team was aiming to complete the episodes by the end of the year.

=== Casting ===
At the time of the announcement, the majority of the main voice cast was set to return, while John DiMaggio was still in negotiations. DiMaggio stated that he had not accepted the role in mid-February 2022 as he believed the entire cast of Futurama should be paid more. He stated, "Bender is part of my soul and nothing about this is meant to be disrespectful to the fans or my Futurama family. It's about self-respect. And honestly, [it's about] being tired of an industry that's become far too corporate and takes advantage of artists' time and talent... I wish I could give you every detail so you would understand, but it's not my place." In March, DiMaggio officially rejoined the series after working out a new deal, calling the prior events "Bendergate". He later revealed that he did not get a raise, "but what I did get was a lot of respect". Had he not returned, Bender would have been voiced by a different guest star in each episode.

Similar to other animation recastings after the murder of George Floyd, several non-white characters originally voiced by white actors have been recast. Amy Wong's father, Leo Wong, was originally voiced by West, and reporter Scoop Chang, who was originally voiced by Maurice LaMarche, are both now being voiced by Feodor Chin. Both Officer URL and Barbados Slim, two other characters that DiMaggio had voiced previously, are now voiced by Kevin Michael Richardson.

Rapper Coolio, who provided his voice for Kwanzaa-Bot in three previous episodes, died on September 28, 2022. Two days after his death, it was confirmed that Coolio had recorded another episode as Kwanzaa-Bot before his death. When the series was released, this episode was revealed as the sixth episode "I Know What You Did Next Xmas", which was dedicated in his memory.

== Release ==
In February 2023, a release window was set sometime around the mid-2023 season. On May 18, 2023, Hulu announced that the season would premiere on July 24, 2023. Hulu's sister streaming service, Disney+ announced, via a press release, that it would also stream the new season of Futurama internationally as a Star Original. Disney+ later announced that the season would premiere new episodes around the world simultaneously with Hulu in the United States.

== Reception ==
=== Viewership ===
Parrot Analytics, which looks at consumer engagement in consumer research, streaming, downloads, and on social media, reported that Futurama had the second most in-demand United States series premiere in the second quarter of 2023. It had 50.2 times the average demand of all other series in the U.S. during the week of June 24–30. Futurama reached a peak demand of 77.56× on July 27, three days after its premiere. From July 1 to August 20, it was the most in-demand Hulu Original and the most in-demand series overall on Hulu. Viewer overlap was high with other long-running adult animated series, including The Simpsons, Family Guy, and Rick and Morty.

Whip Media, which tracks viewership data for the more than 25 million worldwide users of its TV Time app, reported that Futurama ranked among the top five most-streamed original series in the U.S. from the week ending July 30 to the week ending September 3. Futurama ranked No. 8 on Hulu's "Top 15 Today" list—a daily updated list of the platform's most-watched titles—on September 14. Nielsen Media Research, which records streaming viewership on some U.S. television screens, calculated that Futurama was the third most-streamed original series from July 24–30, recording 506 million minutes of viewing time. Futurama subsequently recorded 349 million minutes of watch time from September 11–17, ranking as the ninth most-streamed original series.

=== Critical response ===
On the review aggregator website Rotten Tomatoes, 86% of 29 critics' reviews are positive, with an average rating of 7/10. The website's consensus reads: "Shut up and take our money!" Metacritic, which uses a weighted average, gave the season a score of 67 out of 100 based on 13 critic reviews, indicating "generally favorable reviews".

Joel Keller of Decider praised Futurama for its seamless return, noting that the series retains its original charm and characters even as their relationships evolve. They found that the first episode humorously addresses the show's history of cancellations, while the second episode offers a more poignant narrative. Keller highlighted the essential role of Bender, played by John DiMaggio, in maintaining the show's distinctive humor. Though the reboot may not have been necessary, they concluded that it effectively continues the show's legacy with its familiar blend of satire and clever storytelling. Tara Bennett of Paste rated Futurama a nine out of ten, commending its return on Hulu for maintaining the series' signature wit and satire. They highlighted the successful revival of beloved characters and the series' contemporary critiques, such as sharp takes on cryptocurrency and automated retail. Bennett particularly enjoyed the "Dune"-inspired parody episode, finding it both intellectually engaging and hilariously funny, which reaffirms the show's lasting charm and relevance after a decade off the air.

=== Accolades ===
Futurama was nominated for Animation at the 76th Writers Guild of America Awards.
