= Cody Ziglar =

American TV and comics writer and comedian

- Ziglar at Dragon Con in 2026
- Born: Cody Ziglar Pine Hall, North Carolina
- Area: Writer
- Notable works: Miles Morales: Spider-Man, Spider-Punk, Futurama, Rick and Morty, She-Hulk: Attorney at Law, Robot Chicken, and Craig of the Creek

Cody Ziglar is an American television and comics writer and comedian. His writing credits include Futurama, Rick and Morty, and She-Hulk: Attorney at Law and he is the current writer on the Miles Morales: Spider-Man comic book from Marvel Comics. He has been nominated for an Emmy Award for his work on Robot Chicken.

== Career ==
Ziglar graduated from the Savannah College of Art & Design Film & Television MFA program. After graduating, he moved to LA and eventually got a job working the equipment checkout cage at the Upright Citizen's Brigade. He became a producer for podcasts at Earwolf and then was hired for his first writing job at Craig of the Creek.

Writing for the show She-Hulk: Attorney at Law got him into writing for Marvel and, in 2021, he did a backup story in Miles Morales: Spider-Man #25, before he was announced as one of the writers for the "Spider-Man: Beyond" arc (from Amazing Spider-Man vol. 5 #75 to #93), alongside Zeb Wells, Kelly Thompson, Saladin Ahmed, and Patrick Gleason.

In January 2022, he and artist Justin Mason were announced to be the creative team for the new Spider-Punk mini-series and in June, he wrote two issues of What If...? Miles Morales. In September, it was announced that Ziglar and artist Federico Vicentini would relaunch Miles Morales: Spider-Man after the previous run by Saladin Ahmed ended. In 2023, he co-wrote the Carnage Reigns crossover with Alex Paknadel and, at San Diego Comic-Comic, it was announced he would write a part of the "Gang War" crossover that involved Amazing Spider-Man, Spider-Woman, and Daredevil. In June 2024, he participated in the "Blood Hunt" crossover, where Miles was turned into a vampire.

In 2024, he and Justin Mason reunited to do a sequel to their Spider-Punk comic, Spider-Punk: Arms Race. It was also announced that Ziglar and artist Rogê Antônio would be the next creative team for the Deadpool relaunch in April 2024. The book involved Ellie, Deadpool's daughter, and the introduction of a new villain, Death Grip. In June, the "Death of Deadpool" arc was announced with Deadpool dying in issue #6 and Ellie taking over as the new Deadpool in issue #7. In November, it was announced that Ziglar's Miles Morales and Deadpool comics would cross over with each other in a story called "Pools of Blood." It was also announced that he would be one of the writers for the Free Comic Book Day: Amazing Spider-Man/Ultimate Universe issue.

In 2024, he also wrote and released Goobers, a horror-comedy comic, through Vault Comics.

== Personal life ==
Ziglar was born and raised in a "super small rural community" named Pine Hall, North Carolina. He got his MFA in Film & Television Production from Savannah College of Art & Design and interned at Adult Swim.

== Bibliography ==
=== Marvel Comics ===
- Alien: Black, White & Blood #3, short story "Gear in the Machine" (2024)
- Captain America #750, short story "The Mantle" (2023)
- Deadpool:
  - Deadpool: Seven Slaughters #1, short story "Walking Papers" (2023)
  - Deadpool vol. 10 #1-present (2024–present)
- Heroes Reborn: Siege Society #1 (2021)
- Marvel's Voices: Legacy vol. 2 #1, short story "Legend" (2022)
- Spider-Man:
  - Miles Morales: Spider-Man #25, short story "Big-Time Buzzkill," and #30, short story "Don't Run Jux" (2021)
  - Amazing Spider-Man vol. 5 #79, 80, 80.Bey, 84, 85, 92.BEY (2021–2022)
  - What If...? Miles Morales #1, 5 (2022)
  - Spider-Punk #1-5 (2022)
  - Miles Morales: Spider-Man vol. 2 #1-42 (2022–2026)
  - Marvel's Voices: Spider-Verse #1, short story "Training Day" (2023)
  - Carnage Reigns Alpha #1 and Carnage Reigns Omega #1, co-written with Alex Paknadel (2023)
  - Extreme Venomverse #5, short story "Full Symbiote Panic" (2023)
  - Amazing Spider-Man Gang War: First Strike #1, co-written with Zeb Wells (2023)
  - Giant-Size Spider-Man vol. 3 #1 (2024)
  - Spider-Punk: Arms Race #1-4 (2024)
  - Web of Spider-Man vol. 3 #1, short story "Miles Morales: Spider-Man" (2024)

=== Other Comics ===
- Goobers #1-present (2024–present) (Vault Comics)

== Filmography ==
Year	Title	Role	Notes
2020	Craig of the Creek	Writer	7 episodes
2021	Robot Chicken	Writer	4 episodes, nominated for Emmy for "Happy Russian Deathdog Dolloween 2 U"
2022	She-Hulk: Attorney at Law	Writer	Episode: "Ribbit and Rip It"
2023	Rick and Morty	Writer	Episode: "Rickfending Your Mort"
2023-2026	Futurama	Writer, producer	Episodes: "Rage Against the Vaccine", "Quids Game", "Murderoni", and "The Charm Offensive"
