= Futurama: Bender's Game =

- DVD cover
- Directed by: Dwayne Carey-Hill
- Written by: Eric Horsted (Parts One and Two); Michael Rowe; Eric Kaplan (Part Three); David X. Cohen; Patric M. Verrone (Part Four)
- Story by: Eric Horsted; David X. Cohen
- Produced by: Lee Supercinski; Claudia Katz
- Starring: Billy West; Katey Sagal; John DiMaggio; Tress MacNeille; Maurice LaMarche; Phil LaMarr; Lauren Tom; David Herman
- Edited by: Paul D. Calder
- Music by: Christopher Tyng
- Production companies: The Curiosity Company; 20th Century Fox Television (Note: Credited as "30th Century Fox Television".)
- Distributed by: 20th Century Fox Home Entertainment
- Release date: November 4, 2008
- Running time: 87 minutes
- Country: United States
- Language: English

Futurama: Bender's Game is a 2008 American direct-to-video adult animated science fiction action comedy film and the third of the four Futurama films that make up the show's fifth season. It was released on DVD and Blu-ray on November 4, 2008.

According to the Beast with a Billion Backs DVD commentary, the film, which spoofs Dungeons & Dragons, was in production when Dungeons & Dragons creator, Gary Gygax, died. The film contains a post-credits tribute to Gygax in the form of a title card and a clip of him from the episode "Anthology of Interest I". Elements of J. R. R. Tolkien's The Lord of the Rings and George Lucas' Star Wars are also parodied. The title of the film is a pun on the book Ender's Game, by Orson Scott Card, though the Futurama film has "very little to do with the subject material" of the book. Conversely, the 1985 book also used "Bender" as a mocking pun for "Ender", but Matt Groening stated this is not the original inspiration for Bender's name.

== Plot ==
Bender finds Cubert and Dwight playing Dungeons & Dragons, but cannot join in since, as a robot, he has no imagination. Bender manages to imagine himself as a medieval knight named "Titanius Anglesmith, fancy man of Cornwood" and enters the game. He becomes lost in his fantasy and goes on a rampage, resulting in his being committed to the Hal Institute for Criminally Insane Robots.

The crew learns that Mom, who controls the world's only dark matter mine, is restricting the supply to drive up profits. The Professor reveals that while working for Mom, he discovered how to turn dark matter into fuel. The process created two crystals, with Mom keeping one for herself and Farnsworth hiding the other, "anti-backwards" crystal. If the crystals are brought together, they will render dark matter useless. Farnsworth, Fry, and Leela fly to Mom's mine with the crystal to neutralize the dark matter. When the crew sneak in, they discover it is actually a farm harvesting the dark matter feces from Nibblonians, including a captured Nibbler. When Nibbler asks why they are not surprised he can talk, they tell him that he forgot to erase their memories the last time.

Encountering Mom and her three sons, Leela fends off Walt, Larry and Igner, while Farnsworth tries to bring his and Mom's crystals together; when Farnsworth is at risk of losing the anti-backwards crystal, he swallows it. The closeness of the crystals triggers a resonance in all dark matter and catapults the characters into Cornwood, the realm Bender imagines himself to be from.

"Frydo" (Fry) and "Leegola" (Leela, now a centaur) encounter "Titanius" (Bender); no one in Cornwood has any memory of their real lives except for Fry and Leela. The three are attacked by "Waltazar" (Walt), "Larius" (Larry) and "Ignus" (Igner), who are trying to recover the anti-backwards crystal. While fighting them off, Frydo drops the crystal, which rolls like a die and magically banishes the sons. Frydo and company meet the wizard "Greyfarn" (Farnsworth), who explains that in this world, the anti-backwards crystal is known as the Die of Power. The evil sorceress "Momon" (Mom) molded a set of powerful dice, but lost this one and has been trying to locate it so she can tap its immense potential. The only way to stop Momon is to enter her lair at the Geysers of Gygax and throw the Die into the lake of molten plastic from which it was formed.

As the group sets out, the intersex, pacifist centaur Hermaphrodite (Hermes) bars their passage; the centaurs oppose the violence that Frydo and company intend to do. Leela easily pushes past Hermaphrodite and leads the group to the Cave of Hopelessness. As they approach, "Gynecaladriel" (Amy), Queen of the Water Nymphos, joins their quest and seduces the guard, enabling them to enter the Cave. Inside the Cave, a horde of "Morcs" attacks, followed by a gigantic lobster creature (Zoidberg) which Leegola cuts to pieces in a rage, and the wormlike Tunneling Horror which Frydo defeats using the Die. As Frydo becomes obsessed with the Die, Leegola renounces violence and takes refuge among the centaurs. Frydo attempts to murder the other members of the party; when foiled, he flees with the die.

The remaining travelers journey to Wipe Castle to raise an army against Momon, only to find that Roberto, its insane king, has sent his men on a suicide mission. The heroes defend the kingdom as Waltazar and Larius lay siege to it until Leegola regains her violent nature and rallies the centaurs to help her friends. Frydo makes his way into Momon's lair, aided by Zoidberg's still-living head; Frydo cannot bring himself to destroy the Die, so Zoidberg bites him to force him to drop it. Momon becomes a dragon and goes after the Die, but when it stops rolling, it turns Frydo into a dragon as well. The rest of the party arrives, along with Ignus, who reveals that he is Greyfarn's son. Overwhelmed by this revelation, Greyfarn inadvertently allows Momon to seize the Die.

Cornwood collapses in on itself, hurling the characters back into the real world. The Professor requests a hug from Igner. As the Professor theorized, Igner swallowed Mom's crystal in defiance, and the hug brings the crystals in the two men's stomachs close enough to render dark matter useless. The crew harnesses dozens of Nibblonians to pull their ship home.

== Cast ==
- Billy West as Philip J. Fry / Frydo, Professor Farnsworth / Greyfarn, Dr. Zoidberg / Monster, Additional voices
- Katey Sagal as Leela / Leegola
- John DiMaggio as Bender / Titanius Anglesmith, Igner / Ignus, Additional voices
- Tress MacNeille as Mom / Momon, Nurse Ratchet, Additional voices
- Maurice LaMarche as Walt / Waltazar, Dr. Perceptron, Additional voices
- Phil LaMarr as Hermes Conrad / Hermaphrodite, Dwight Conrad, Additional voices
- Lauren Tom as Amy Wong / Gynecaladriel, Additional voices
- David Herman as Larry / Larius, Roberto / King of Wipe Castle, Additional voices
- Kath Soucie as Cubert Farnsworth, Additional voices
- Frank Welker as Nibbler, Additional voices
- Gary Gygax as himself (archive footage taken from "Anthology of Interest I")
- Rich Little as himself
- George Takei as himself
- David X. Cohen, Paul D. Calder, Danik Thomas as Die of Power (uncredited, singing harmony)

== Features ==
=== Opening sequence ===
The opening subtitle of the DVD and the first part of the broadcast version is "The flames in your TV are not part of the show". The cartoon on the Jumbotron is Quasi at the Quackadero. Similar to the previous film, instead of the ship crashing into the Jumbotron as in a regular episode, it gets absorbed through the screen, whereupon the opening sequence becomes a parody of the 1968 animated film Yellow Submarine. The crew flies by bits of the number e then smashes back out through the screen and into the real world.

=== DVD ===
The DVD features an Audio Commentary, Storyboard Animatic, Futurama Genetics Lab, Dungeons & Dragons and Futurama featurette, How to draw Futurama in 83 easy steps Featurette, Deleted scene, 3D Model with Animator Discussion, Outtakes, Bender's Anti-Piracy Warning and sneak peek at Futurama: Into the Wild Green Yonder. Easter Eggs show David X. Cohen displaying a collection of different Polyhedrons, and extra outtakes of Billy West.

=== Blu-ray ===
The Blu-ray also exclusively features Picture-in-Picture video footage of the commentary.
