= Futurama: Into the Wild Green Yonder =

- DVD cover
- Directed by: Peter Avanzino
- Screenplay by: Ken Keeler
- Story by: Ken Keeler; David X. Cohen
- Produced by: Lee Supercinski; Claudia Katz
- Starring: Billy West; Katey Sagal; John DiMaggio; Tress MacNeille; Maurice LaMarche; Phil LaMarr; Lauren Tom; David Herman; Dawnn Lewis
- Edited by: Paul D. Calder
- Music by: Christopher Tyng
- Production companies: The Curiosity Company; 20th Century Fox Television (Note: Credited as "30th Century Fox Television".)
- Distributed by: 20th Century Fox Home Entertainment
- Release dates: February 23, 2009 (United Kingdom); February 24, 2009 (United States)
- Running time: 89 minutes
- Country: United States
- Language: English

Futurama: Into the Wild Green Yonder is a 2009 American direct-to-video adult animated science fiction action comedy-adventure film based on the animated series Futurama, and the fourth and final of the direct-to-DVD films that make up the show's fifth season. The film was written by Ken Keeler, based on a story by Keeler and David X. Cohen, and directed by Peter Avanzino. Guest stars include Phil Hendrie, Penn Jillette (credited with Teller), Snoop Dogg, and Seth MacFarlane, who sings the theme song. In the movie, Leela becomes an outlaw when she and a group of ecologically-minded feminists attempt to save an asteroid of primitive life forms and the Violet Dwarf star from being destroyed, while Fry joins a secret society and attempts to stop a mysterious species known as the "Dark Ones" from destroying all life in the universe. The title itself is a reference to the U.S. Air Force Song, the main chorus of which describes reaching "Into the wild blue yonder".

The DVD and Blu-ray were released by 20th Century Fox Home Entertainment on February 23, 2009, while the film itself premiered on February 6, 2009, at New York Comic Con. It made its broadcast premiere on Comedy Central on August 30, 2009. The film and its predecessors together comprise season five of Futurama, with each film being separated into four episodes of the broadcast season. It won the 2009 Annie Award for Best Home Entertainment Production, and 20th Century Fox and Comedy Central cited sales of Into the Wild Green Yonder and the other Futurama direct-to-DVD movies as one reason Comedy Central decided to renew the Futurama television series in 2009.

== Plot ==
The Planet Express crew visits Amy's parents, Leo and Inez, who are destroying the "old" Mars Vegas and constructing a more extravagant one. A group of eco-feminists led by Frida Waterfall protests the destruction of the environment, leading to an accident that leaves Frida's necklace lodged inside Fry's brain. Leela saves a Martian muck leech, the last of its species, from the site. In New Mars Vegas, Fry starts panicking when he cannot stop hearing the thoughts of everyone around him. He meets Hutch, a transient who gives Fry a tinfoil hat to keep others' thoughts out of his head.

Leo reveals plans to build the Universe's largest miniature golf course, destroying 12% of the Milky Way in the process. Farnsworth and the crew survey the site, finding an asteroid in a violet dwarf star system teeming with primordial life. Nevertheless, Farnsworth approves Leo's project. Disgusted, Leela joins the eco-feminists to sabotage the project.

The asteroid in the violet dwarf system

Hutch introduces Fry to the "Legion of Mad Fellows", a secret society of tinfoil hat-wearing telepaths led by the Number 9 man. No. 9 tells Fry of two species in an evolutionary arms race: the nearly-extinct "Encyclopods", who evolved to preserve the DNA of endangered species so they could be restored, and the "Dark Ones", who want to destroy all life. The violet dwarf is the only surviving egg of the Encyclopods. Due to a resurgence in the life-giving force "Chi", the Encyclopod will soon be reborn. As Fry is immune to the Dark Ones' psionic powers, he alone can save it from Leo Wong's plans to turn it into a golf course.

To end the sabotage, Leo enlists Zapp Brannigan and Kif Kroker, who then hire Bender to locate the eco-feministas. Fry infiltrates Leo's empire as a security guard. Amy is angered by her father's sexist jokes and joins Leela, while Bender bugs Fry's phone in case he communicates with Leela. Fry runs into Frida and has her take a message of support to Leela, but an unseen Dark One murders Frida.

Farnsworth prepares to close Planet Express; with their delivery team missing they cannot continue. Leo Wong hires them to put up a fence around the construction site. Farnsworth cancels the closing and goes with Zoidberg and Hermes to do the job. They are captured by the eco-feminists, who commandeer the Planet Express ship. When the eco-feministas suspect Fry of murdering Frida, Fry and Leela arrange a rendezvous. They are ambushed and imprisoned by the Nimbus, tipped off by Bender.

At a Legion meeting, No. 9 explains that Fry must stop the implosion of the violet dwarf and thwart the Dark One who is sure to be present. Though no one knows the Dark One's form, its mind cannot be read, allowing Fry to identify it. No. 9 gives Fry the Omega Device, which can temporarily disable the Dark One at close range. Bender frees the eco-feministas from prison to uphold his record for most crimes committed at once. Hermes, Zoidberg, Scruffy, and a repentant Farnsworth rescue them.

At the ceremony, Fry cannot locate an unreadable mind; he concludes that he himself (having an unreadable mind) must be the Dark One. The eco-feministas disrupt the ceremony, but Fry convinces Leela to let him proceed. Fry activates the Omega Device, which creates a small dome around the two that seemingly has no effect. Leela's leech falls to the ground, revealing itself as the final Dark One. The asteroid and other objects form into a giant sperm and flies into the violet dwarf star, creating an Encyclopod embryo which quickly matures, taking the form of a giant manta ray-like creature. The Dark One kills Hutch, whose dying act is to pull Frida's necklace from Fry's forehead, causing Fry to lose his telepathy. The Encyclopod kills the Dark One.

Zapp attempts to apprehend the escaped prisoners, but the Planet Express crew, Kif, and the Eco-feminists escape. Fry and Leela profess their love as the Nimbus chases the Planet Express ship toward a wormhole, which the Professor warns could take them trillions of light years away. Everyone agrees to go for it. Fry and Leela share a kiss as the ship enters the wormhole.

== Cast ==
- Billy West as Philip J. Fry, Professor Farnsworth, Doctor Zoidberg, Zapp Brannigan, Leo Wong, Additional voices
- Katey Sagal as Leela
- John DiMaggio as Bender, Joey Mousepad, Additional voices
- Tress MacNeille as Mom, Fanny, Additional voices
- Maurice LaMarche as Kif Kroker, Donbot, Clamps, Calculon, Additional voices
- Phil LaMarr as Hermes Conrad, Additional voices
- Lauren Tom as Amy Wong, Inez Wong, Trixie
- David Herman as Number 9, Additional voices
- Dawnn Lewis as LaBarbara Conrad, Prison Warden
- Snoop Dogg as himself
- Phil Hendrie as Frida Waterfall, Hutch Waterfall, The Encyclopod
- Seth MacFarlane as Mars Vegas singer
- Penn & Teller as Themselves

== Continuity ==
The film draws upon several major and minor running themes of the Futurama series. As in previous environmentally-minded episodes such as "The Problem with Popplers", "A Taste of Freedom" and "The Birdbot of Ice-Catraz", the Waterfall family makes an appearance, with Frida Waterfall reappearing along with a new member, Hutch (identifying himself as Frida's brother by removing her jewelry from Fry's head as Hutch dies), and in keeping with tradition both Frida and Hutch Waterfall meet an untimely end. The Encyclopod's decision to preserve Hutch's DNA defines it as Hutch's successor and serves as a warning about the fragility of the existence of the human species. With dark matter now useless as fuel the Planet Express ship has been modified to run on whale oil, an alternative introduced in "Bendin' in the Wind".

Fry was originally frozen and brought to the future by Nibbler, because a Nibblonian prophecy foresaw that he and his (unique) Delta-wave-deficient mind (a consequence of him being his own grandfather) would be required to save the universe. In Yonder Fry is once again appointed for such a task (though by the Legion of Mad Fellows instead of the Nibblonians), due to his immunity from the Dark Ones' psionic attacks.

The No. 9 man, a recurring background character throughout the series, is given a significant role in the film, though quite different from the role in the series for which he was originally conceived.

This screenshot shows every character, at the time of the movie, from the Futurama series.

As fan service, the climactic scene of the film features a scene with up to 200 characters on screen at once; most minor characters from Futurama's history can be seen (Unit 2013 appearing twice) with the exception of the children (like Dwight and Cubert), who were removed when the production team realized that Morbo mentions that there are no children present. In the DVD commentary, producer David X. Cohen notes that Rough Draft Korea, Futurama's overseas animation studio, charged a significant premium because of the difficulty of animating this scene.

In the final scene of the film, Amy and Kif are reunited after being estranged. After years of Fry trying to win her over, Leela finally returns Fry's love in full; Cohen notes that there was considerable debate among the Futurama writers about how to end the movie, and that Futurama creator Matt Groening himself pushed for the actual conclusion.

The film was initially intended to end the series. After Futurama was renewed, its creators were unsure if the storylines in the film would be continued. Groening stated that he wanted to ignore the film's ending and move on with the show. Cohen felt differently, stating that the revelations at the end should be resolved, even if the resolutions were brief, which they were in the premiere episode of the new season.

== Production ==
The Futurama staff began working on the film in 2006, and at two different points labor issues affected the production process. According to producer Lee Supercinski, the studio realized that they were going to receive the animatic of the film from Rough Draft Studios two weeks before the deadline for the 2007–2008 Writers Guild of America strike. As a result, the writers were forced to make revisions to the script without having completely reviewed the animatic; no writing was done during the strike. The Futurama studio then received the colored film in June 2008, weeks before a proposed Screen Actors Guild strike deadline, again forcing the writers to revise the script without completely reviewing the picture.

Aware that Into the Wild Green Yonder could have been the final Futurama episode at the time of writing, the writers inserted numerous references to that fact. The title screen displays the message "The Humans Shall Not Defeat Us" in Alien Language 1; according to Cohen, the message is a defiant statement regarding the possible end of the series. Midway through the movie, a shot of the exterior of the Planet Express building draped with a banner reading "Going Out Of Business Forever! Again!" is shown, a reference to the original series' previous cancellation in 2003. The scene where Professor Farnsworth removes Zoidberg's and Hermes's career chips, and the countdown scene at the violet dwarf implosion ceremony, both reference events from the pilot episode, "Space Pilot 3000" and also "The Cryonic Woman". The cliffhanger nature of the final scene in the movie was devised so that it could conclude the series on an emotional note, but also provide a point of departure for a series renewal, according to Cohen.

The script contains several detailed scientific references, such as the Keeler Gap in the rings of Saturn, the asteroid 2261 Keeler, and the Keeler crater on Mars, all named after astronomer James Edward Keeler. In the movie, the violet dwarf star is located at "galactic coordinates 167.84, -58.03, Mark 948", and Cohen mentions in the DVD commentary that the first two coordinates refer to another astronomical object. In addition, the Martian muck leech is given the scientific name Cyprinodon martius. Writer Ken Keeler adapted the name from Cyprinodon salinus, the scientific name of the Death Valley pupfish, which like the Martian muck leech lives in the desert and is nearly extinct.

The opening musical theme is a Frank Sinatra-style number, sung by Family Guy and American Dad! creator Seth MacFarlane, as the Planet Express ship flies around the casinos of Mars Vegas. The opening cartoon is the 1929 Aesop's Sound Fables cartoon The Fly's Bride.

== Reception ==
Overall the film has received mixed reviews. Alynda Wheat of Entertainment Weekly gave the film a grade of B, saying that it catered to established fans. Scott Collura of IGN rated the film itself 5/10, praising the use of both major and minor characters from the series, and the science fiction content, but criticizing the film for being disjointed and for its "underwhelming climax" and concluding that it "never fully captures the greatness of the original series." Collura rated the DVD 7/10, noting the high quality of the video transfer, the image detail and depth, and the use of surround sound and low-frequency effects. Martin Liebman of Blu-ray.com rated the movie 2.5/5 and the Blu-ray release 3.5/5 overall. Liebman praised the film for its development of the primary characters in a way that would appeal to longtime fans and new viewers, but criticized the messy plot and haphazard pacing of the movie. Liebman lauded the Blu-ray release for its crisp images, resolution of detail in the animation, lossless soundtrack, and use of surround sound. Bruce Kirkland of Sun Media Corporation wrote that the movie was "just as good as Bender's Big Score", praising its send-ups of Las Vegas and science fiction themes and writing that it "nicely handles its environmental message with trenchant wit". Jeffrey Kauffman of DVD Talk rated the film four stars out of five, calling it "a fun and frenetic windup to a perhaps undervalued television gem".

According to The Numbers, the DVD sold approximately 83,000 units for a total of $1.6 million during its initial week of release, placing it 20th in sales across the US. As of April 19, 2009, estimated DVD sales in the US stand at approximately 159,000 units for a total of $3.03 million. Comedy Central cited sales of the DVD as one reason it decided to renew the Futurama television series.
