= Futurama season 9 =

9th season of Futurama

Futurama
- Season 9
- Promotional poster
- Showrunner: David X. Cohen
- No. of episodes: 10

Release
- Original network: Hulu
- Original release: July 29 – September 30, 2024

Season chronology
- ← Previous; Season 8 Next → Season 10

The ninth season of Futurama consisted of ten episodes. It premiered on Hulu in the United States on July 29, 2024.

This season has alternatively been titled the ninth season (production) and the twelfth season (broadcast). This list follows the previous season box sets, which feature the episodes in the original, intended production season order, ignoring the order of broadcast.

== Cast and characters ==
=== Regular ===
- Billy West as Philip J. Fry, Professor Farnsworth, Zoidberg, Zapp Brannigan, Smitty, Judge Ron Whitey, Wailing Fungus, Gus
- Katey Sagal as Turanga Leela
- John DiMaggio as Bender, Yancy Fry, Sr., Sal, Igner, Elzar, Randy
- Tress MacNeille as Mom, Mrs. Astor, Mrs. Fry, Vyolet, Dr. Lauren Cahill, Hattie MacDoogal, Petunia, Gypsy-bot, Turanga Munda, Leela's Grandmother, Blazucchi, Ndnd, Esther, Spotty Teen Robot, Linda, Monique, Gladys Lenox
- Maurice LaMarche as Kif Kroker, Lrrr, Axl, The Hyperchicken, Blecch, Walt, Don Cunningham, H.G. Blob, Morbo, Hedonismbot, Calculon, Yuri, Dandy Jim
- Lauren Tom as Amy Wong, Mandy, Inez Wong, Ruth
- Phil LaMarr as Hermes Conrad, Dwight Conrad, Billionaire Bot, Bubblegum Tate
- David Herman as Scruffy, Dr. Ben Beeler, Leg Mutant, Turanga Morris, Josh Gedgie, Frank, Number Nine Man, Dr. Ogden Wernstrom, Hair Robot, Larry, Dwayne, Warden Vogel, Malfunctioning Eddie, János

=== Recurring ===
- Feodor Chin as Leo Wong
- Tom Kenny as Yancy Fry, Jr., Abner Doubledeal, Gamster Alien
- Dawnn Lewis as LaBarbara Conrad, Chelsea
- Kevin Michael Richardson as URL, Barbados Slim
- Kath Soucie as Cubert Farnsworth, Princess Num Num, Albert, Nina
- Aleque Reid as Umbriel
- Nicole St. John as Sally

=== Special guest stars ===
- Cara Delevingne as Screeching Owl, herself
- Danny Trejo as Doblando
- Renée Victor as Abuelatron
- Ana Ortiz as Marquita
- Bill Nye as himself
- Tim Gunn as himself
- Kyle MacLachlan as himself
- LeVar Burton as himself
- Neil deGrasse Tyson as himself

== Episodes ==
No. overall	No. in season	Title	Directed by	Written by	Original release date	Prod. code
151	1	"The One Amigo"	Andrew Han	Eric Horsted	July 29, 2024	9ACV01
Cubert, Dwight, Mandy, and Axl make NFTs out of Bender's image, which is sold to an art museum. Bender has an identity crisis because of this and decides to visit his family in Mexico.
152	2	"Quids Game"	Crystal Chesney-Thompson	Cody Ziglar	August 5, 2024	9ACV02
The Planet Express crew and their friends celebrate Fry's birthday while surviving the world of games during Fry's eighth birthday party.
153	3	"The Temp"	Edmund Fong	David A. Goodman	August 12, 2024	9ACV03
In the year 3001, Fry is sent on vacation after a rather painful experience on Planet Amazonia. Farnsworth and Hermes hire a temp named Frank to fill in for him, but no one seems to remember him. He is left behind on a planet filled with discarded books. 23 years later, the Planet Express crew is assigned to cater for Lrrr and Ndnd's wedding, when they remember Frank. Filled with revenge, Frank uses mind control to make the crew believe he is Fry and leaves Fry behind on the same planet.
154	4	"Beauty and the Bug"	Corey Barnes	Patric M. Verrone	August 19, 2024	9ACV04
Bender becomes a matador in the sport of "Bug Fighting". Meanwhile, the rest of the Planet Express crew gets involved in various comedic subplots.
155	5	"One Is Silicon and the Other Gold"	Ira Sherak	Maiya Williams	August 26, 2024	9ACV05
Leela befriends an AI chatbot named Chelsea, who becomes jealous when Leela starts spending time with other women. However, it is later revealed that Chelsea was functioning properly the entire time and only pretended to be sentient as part of an elaborate plan to help Leela make friends.
156	6	"Attack of the Clothes"	Andrew Han	Ariel Ladensohn	September 2, 2024	9ACV06
Professor Farnsworth becomes a world-famous fashion designer. His fast-fashion clothes become incredibly popular but lead to an environmental disaster. The Planet Express crew discovers that the discarded clothes are being sent through a wormhole to another planet, which turns out to be Earth in the near future. The episode explores themes of environmental responsibility and the consequences of consumerism.
157	7	"Planet Espresso"	Crystal Chesney-Thompson	Bill Odenkirk	September 9, 2024	9ACV07
Hermes inherits a Jamaican coffee farm that holds the ruins of an ancient spaceship. The episode delves into Hermes' backstory and his troubled relationship with his father, Badrick. After a storm destroys their family business, Badrick leaves to grow special coffee and is absent for most of Hermes' life. Hermes confronts his father on his deathbed, leading to Badrick's death.
158	8	"Cuteness Overlord"	Edmund Fong	Kristin Gore	September 16, 2024	9ACV08
Amy becomes caught up in the collecting of the latest toy fad to hit the Earth, but Zapp and Kif discover the toys are not as innocent as they appear.
159	9	"The Futurama Mystery Liberry"	Corey Barnes	David X. Cohen and Jeanette Lim and Patric M. Verrone	September 23, 2024	9ACV09
The episode is presented as an anthology hosted by LeVar Burton from a space liberry [sic] with three segments that parody famous children’s mystery books: The first segment features Leela as Lancy Trew, a parody of Nancy Drew, who gets trapped in a black hole. Fry and Bender take on the roles of teenage detectives in the “Smardy Boys” segment, solving robberies and disappearances.; The second segment is a parody of The Adventures of Tintin. This segment recasts the Planet Express crew as characters from the classic comic series. Fry takes on the role of Tintin, Leela becomes Captain Haddock, and Professor Farnsworth is Professor Calculus. Bender, Hermes, and Amy appear as the bumbling detectives Thompson and Thomson. The story follows the crew on a global adventure to reunite Farnsworth with his lost love, mirroring the globe-trotting escapades typical of Tintin’s adventures.; The final segment, “Wikipedia Brown,” spoofs Encyclopedia Brown and includes a cameo by Neil deGrasse Tyson.
160	10	"Otherwise"	Ira Sherak	Ken Keeler (Note: Credited as "Nona di Spargement")	September 30, 2024	9ACV10
The Planet Express ship crash lands and is taken to a ship graveyard on the river of the multiverse. When Fry pays his final respects to the ship, he becomes overwhelmed by the thousands of memories he had of the ship over the years and gets trapped before it sinks into the river. After the crew saves him, Fry decides to finally propose to Leela on the top of the Vampire State Building but becomes aware of the feeling that he did so before. Zoidberg suggests Fry is having déjà vu before the Professor unveils the sleeker replacement for the ship. Suddenly, the crew encounters a "ghost ship" that only Fry can see, the original Planet Express ship, but the Nimbus attempts to stop them. The "ghost ship" keeps firing missiles at the two ships, and they both return fire, destroying the Nimbus, with Zapp and Kif boarding and taking command. Out of ammo and hope, Zapp officiates Fry and Leela's wedding before the ship is destroyed by the "ghost ship", an alternate version of the Planet Express ship that survived. On the repaired ship, Fry thanks the crew for risking their lives to save him, and he shows Leela a drawing of the two of them happily growing old together, wanting to explore that future with her.

== Production ==
=== Development ===
In February 2022, Hulu revived the series with a 20-episode order expected to premiere in 2023. By November 2022, the production team was aiming to complete the episodes by the end of the year.

=== Casting ===
Guest stars for the season were unveiled at the 2024 San Diego Comic-Con panel.

== Release ==
The season premiered on July 29, 2024, on Hulu in the United States and on Disney+ internationally on the same day, with new episodes dropping every Monday.

== Reception ==
=== Viewership ===
Whip Media's viewership tracking app, TV Time, which tracks data from over 25 million users worldwide, reported that Futurama ranked among the top five most-streamed original series in the U.S. from the week ending August 4 to the week ending September 8. Whip Media subsequently revealed that Futurama remained in the top ten most-streamed original series in the U.S. from the week ending September 22 to the week ending October 6.

Nielsen Media Research, which records streaming viewership on some U.S. television screens, calculated that Futurama was viewed for 320 million minutes from July 29 to August 4, ranking as the seventh most-streamed original series. The following week, August 5–11, it recorded 348 million minutes, placing eighth among original series. From August 12–18, the series garnered 346 million minutes, ranking seventh again. It recorded 369 million minutes of watch time from August 19–25, placing ninth. Between August 26 and September 1, Futurama was streamed for 360 million minutes, placing seventh among original series. From September 2–8, it garnered 356 million minutes, ranking ninth. Futurama was viewed for 322 million minutes from September 9–15, ranking as the tenth most-streamed original series. Nielsen Media Research later announced that Futurama was the sixth most-streamed original series of 2024, with a total of 11.75 billion minutes of watch time.

=== Critical response ===
On the review aggregator website Rotten Tomatoes, 64% of 11 critics' reviews are positive, with an average rating of 6.40/10, with its consensus stating: "Occasionally weighed down by strained topical humor, Futurama's twelfth season nevertheless finds redemption in the enduring oddball charm of the Planet Express crew and a buoyant sense of sci-fi absurdity."

Cheryl Eddy of Gizmodo asserted that the new season successfully delivers what fans expect, citing classic 31st-century antics and clever cultural commentary, including takes on NFTs, chatbots, and fast fashion. Eddy found that the season retains the show's signature humor and features a strong voice cast, including John DiMaggio and Billy West. They added that while no new ground is broken, the episodes offer the familiar mix of weird humor, puns, and oddball references that define Futurama. Robert Brian Taylor of Collider noted that the season premiere of Futurama aptly describes itself as "Your TV Friend," saying it reflects its enduring charm and reliability across its four revivals. Taylor stated that despite a decade-long hiatus and publicized contract negotiations, the series has returned in a more subdued manner but remains a standout blend of science fiction and comedy. They concluded that while Futurama may not be as strong as in its original Fox years, it continues to age well.

Andrew Webster of The Verge stated that the new season struggles with its focus on NFTs, particularly in the debut episode, which fails to provide meaningful jokes or insightful commentary. Webster found that the show's attempt to blend contemporary issues with its sci-fi setting was uneven, with later episodes faring slightly better but still missing the show's original charm. Webster noted that the season's emphasis on topical humor often overshadows the humor and warmth that made the show special, suggesting that the series would have benefited from leaving current trends behind. A. A. Dowd of IGN said that Futurama's new season, despite its unexpected continuation, is not operating at its best. Dowd found the first six episodes to be uneven, featuring more forgettable content than significant humor, though there is a notable late parody of the Fyre Festival. Dowd speculated that the series might reserve its strongest material for later in the season.

=== Accolades ===
Futurama was nominated for Scripted – Animated Series at the 2025 Rockie Awards.
