= Futurama season 5 =

5th season of Futurama

Futurama
- Season 5
- DVD covers of the four direct-to-video films
- Showrunner: David X. Cohen
- No. of episodes: 16

Release
- Original network: Comedy Central
- Original release: November 27, 2007 – August 30, 2009

Season chronology
- ← Previous; Season 4 Next → Season 6

Futurama's fifth season is composed of the TV edits of the four direct-to-video films, split into four episodes each. While the films were originally released between November 27, 2007 and February 24, 2009, the TV edits began airing on March 23, 2008 and concluded after 16 episodes on August 30, 2009. These episodes were the first produced for Comedy Central, after their negotiations with Fox for syndication rights gave the opportunity to create new episodes.

== Production ==
Futurama was initially canceled by Fox in 2003, due to low ratings. However, in late 2002, Cartoon Network acquired exclusive cable syndication rights to Futurama for a reported $10 million. In January 2003, the network began airing Futurama episodes as the centerpiece to the expansion of their Adult Swim cartoon block. In October 2005, Comedy Central picked up the cable syndication rights to air Futurama's 72-episode run at the start of 2008, following the expiration of Cartoon Network's contract. It was cited as the largest and most expensive acquisition in the network's history. In 2005, it began airing every night, followed by South Park. A Comedy Central teaser trailer announced the return of Futurama on March 23, 2008, which was Bender's Big Score divided into four episodes followed by the other three movies. The series also airs in syndication in many countries around the world.

When Comedy Central began negotiating for the rights to air Futurama reruns, Fox suggested that there was a possibility of also creating new episodes. Negotiations were already underway with the possibility of creating two or three straight-to-DVD films. When Comedy Central committed to sixteen new episodes, it was decided that four films would be produced. On April 26, 2006, Groening noted in an interview that co-creator David X. Cohen and numerous writers from the original series would be returning to work on the movies. All the original voice actors participated. In February 2007, Groening explained the format of the new stories: "[The crew is] writing them as movies and then we're going to chop them up, reconfigure them, write new material and try to make them work as separate episodes."

The first movie, Futurama: Bender's Big Score, was written by Ken Keeler and Cohen, and includes return appearances by the Nibblonians, Seymour, Barbados Slim, Robot Santa, the "God" space entity, Al Gore, and Zapp Brannigan. It was animated in widescreen and was released on standard DVD on November 27, 2007, with a possible Blu-ray Disc release to follow. A release on HD DVD was rumored but later officially denied. Futurama: Bender's Big Score was the first DVD release for which 20th Century Fox implemented measures intended to reduce the total carbon footprint of the production, manufacturing, and distribution processes. Where it was not possible to completely eliminate carbon output, carbon offsets were used. They refer to the changed processes as "carbon neutral".

The second movie, The Beast with a Billion Backs, was released on June 24, 2008. The third movie, Bender's Game was released on DVD and Blu-ray Disc on November 3, 2008 in the UK, November 4, 2008 in the USA, and December 10, 2008 in Australia. The fourth movie, Into the Wild Green Yonder, was released on DVD and Blu-ray Disc on February 23, 2009.

Since no new Futurama projects were originally in production at the time, the movie Into the Wild Green Yonder was designed to stand as the Futurama series finale. However, Groening had expressed a desire to continue the franchise in some form, including as a theatrical film. In an interview with CNN, Groening said that "we have a great relationship with Comedy Central and we would love to do more episodes for them, but I don't know... We're having discussions and there is some enthusiasm but I can't tell if it's just me."

On June 9, 2009, 20th Century Fox announced that Comedy Central had picked up the show for 26 new half-hour episodes that began airing in mid-2010. A smaller writing crew returned.

== Episodes ==
No. overall	No. in season	Title	Directed by	Written by	Original release date	Prod. code
73	1	Bender's Big Score	Dwayne Carey-Hill	Story by : Ken Keeler & David X. Cohen; Teleplay by : Ken Keeler	November 27, 2007 (DVD); March 23, 2008 (Comedy Central)	5ACV01
74	2	Bender's Big Score	Dwayne Carey-Hill	Story by : Ken Keeler & David X. Cohen; Teleplay by : Ken Keeler	November 27, 2007 (DVD); March 23, 2008 (Comedy Central)	5ACV02
75	3	Bender's Big Score	Dwayne Carey-Hill	Story by : Ken Keeler & David X. Cohen; Teleplay by : Ken Keeler	November 27, 2007 (DVD); March 23, 2008 (Comedy Central)	5ACV03
76	4	Bender's Big Score	Dwayne Carey-Hill	Story by : Ken Keeler & David X. Cohen; Teleplay by : Ken Keeler	November 27, 2007 (DVD); March 23, 2008 (Comedy Central)	5ACV04
As Fry learns he has a tattoo of Bender on his buttocks that has universal consequences, nudist alien scammers take over Planet Express and brainwash Bender via a virus to do their bidding. Meanwhile, Leela meets the man of her dreams and Hermes (literally) loses his head during a game of limbo. Using the power of time travel tattooed on Fry's buttocks, the scammers hatch a plan to steal history's most valuable riches. Fry escapes back to the 20th century while Bender is dispatched back in time to kill him. Meanwhile, Leela grows ever closer to her new boyfriend and Hermes gets a new body. Though the scammers release Bender from their control and the tattoo on Fry's buttocks is destroyed, more and more people find themselves being scammed onto the streets. Meanwhile, Leela is marrying her new boyfriend, and Fry discovers what his life could have been like in the 21st century. After Leela's heart (and Hermes' body) are broken at her wedding, the scammers ultimately banish Earth's inhabitants to the corners of the solar system, leading to an intergalactic battle to reclaim Earth. And as the shocking truth of Leela's fiancé is revealed, Bender becomes an unlikely hero. Guest stars: Al Gore as himself, Sarah Silverman as Michelle, Tom Kenny as Yancy Fry Jr., Coolio as Kwanzaabot and Mark Hamill as Chanukah Zombie
77	5	The Beast with a Billion Backs	Peter Avanzino	Story by : Eric Kaplan & David X. Cohen; Teleplay by : Eric Kaplan	June 24, 2008 (DVD); October 19, 2008 (Comedy Central)	5ACV05
78	6	The Beast with a Billion Backs	Peter Avanzino	Story by : Eric Kaplan & David X. Cohen; Teleplay by : Eric Kaplan	June 24, 2008 (DVD); October 19, 2008 (Comedy Central)	5ACV06
79	7	The Beast with a Billion Backs	Peter Avanzino	Story by : Eric Kaplan & David X. Cohen; Teleplay by : Eric Kaplan	June 24, 2008 (DVD); October 19, 2008 (Comedy Central)	5ACV07
80	8	The Beast with a Billion Backs	Peter Avanzino	Story by : Eric Kaplan & David X. Cohen; Teleplay by : Eric Kaplan	June 24, 2008 (DVD); October 19, 2008 (Comedy Central)	5ACV08
When a mysterious tear appears in the universe, Professor Farnsworth mounts an expedition to explore whatever lies on the other side. Meanwhile, as Kif and Amy take their relationship to the next level, Fry discovers his new girlfriend may be spreading her love even further than he can handle. After the Professor's expedition ends with disaster, a military action is proposed, though it strikes a devastating blow that hits too close to Amy's heart when it costs Kif his life. Meanwhile, Fry decides to live in the universe on the other side of the tear as Bender joins the secret robot society of his dreams. Fry has fallen in love with a colossal tentacled monster from beyond the tear, which begins spreading its influence (and its tentacles) everywhere. Meanwhile, Amy deals with Kif's death, Bender builds his human-hating reputation in his new club, and Leela reveals a shocking truth about the monster. The tentacled monster asks everyone in the universe out on a date, eventually leading Earth's population to evacuate the planet so they can live on its body. Meanwhile, the monster brings Kif back to life, and Bender, left in charge of the abandoned robots on Earth, takes drastic measures to bring everyone back. Guest stars: Brittany Murphy as Colleen O'Hallahan, Stephen Hawking as himself, David Cross as Yivo and Dan Castellaneta as Robot Devil
81	9	Bender's Game	Dwayne Carey-Hill	Story by : Eric Horsted & David X. Cohen; Teleplay by : Eric Horsted	November 4, 2008 (DVD); April 26, 2009 (Comedy Central)	5ACV09
82	10	Bender's Game	Dwayne Carey-Hill	Story by : Eric Horsted & David X. Cohen; Teleplay by : Eric Horsted	November 4, 2008 (DVD); April 26, 2009 (Comedy Central)	5ACV10
83	11	Bender's Game	Dwayne Carey-Hill	Story by : Eric Horsted & David X. Cohen; Teleplay by : Eric Kaplan & Michael Rowe	November 4, 2008 (DVD); April 26, 2009 (Comedy Central)	5ACV11
84	12	Bender's Game	Dwayne Carey-Hill	Story by : Eric Horsted & David X. Cohen; Teleplay by : David X. Cohen & Patric M. Verrone	November 4, 2008 (DVD); April 26, 2009 (Comedy Central)	5ACV12
Leela's anger gets the better of her when she wastes precious gas and enters the Space Demolition Derby. In fact, it has gotten the better of her so many times that Farnsworth and Hermes decide to do something about it. Meanwhile, Bender becomes too obsessed with playing Dungeons and Dragons. Farnsworth reveals why he's so angry about the dark matter shortage crisis. Bender is not progressing at the insane asylum. Fry, Leela, and Farnsworth infiltrate Mom's Alaskan headquarters. Fry, Leela and Farnsworth discover the shocking truth behind the dark matter shortage, and suddenly find themselves in the magical world of Cornwood where the knights strangely look like robots and the wizard's headquarters look strangely like outhouses. Frydo becomes obsessed with the Die of Power and flees the Fellowship. Leegola joins the centaurs and becomes a pacifist, and Gynecaladriel, Greyfarn, and Titanius are besieged at Wipe Castle. Guest stars: Gary Gygax as himself (archive recordings), Rich Little as himself and George Takei as himself
85	13	Into the Wild Green Yonder	Peter Avanzino	Story by : Ken Keeler & David X. Cohen; Teleplay by : Ken Keeler	February 23, 2009 (DVD); August 30, 2009 (Comedy Central)	5ACV13
86	14	Into the Wild Green Yonder	Peter Avanzino	Ken Keeler	February 23, 2009 (DVD); August 30, 2009 (Comedy Central)	5ACV14
87	15	Into the Wild Green Yonder	Peter Avanzino	Ken Keeler	February 23, 2009 (DVD); August 30, 2009 (Comedy Central)	5ACV15
88	16	Into the Wild Green Yonder	Peter Avanzino	Story by : Ken Keeler & David X. Cohen; Teleplay by : Ken Keeler	February 23, 2009 (DVD); August 30, 2009 (Comedy Central)	5ACV16
The Planet Express crew visits Amy's parents, Leo and Inez, who are destroying the "old" Mars Vegas and constructing a more extravagant one. A group of eco-feminists, led by Frida Waterfall, protesting the destruction of the environment, leads to an accident wherein a piece of Frida's jewelry lodges inside Fry's brain granting him telepathy. The destruction upsets Leela, but Leo asserts that he has received environmental clearance — from a bribed Professor Farnsworth. Unconvinced, Leela saves a Martian muck leech, the last of its species, from the site. Hutch introduces Fry to the "Legion of Mad Fellows", a secret society of other tin foil hat wearing telepaths led by the No. 9 man. Fry learns that the violet dwarf is the only surviving egg of the Encyclopods, a now-extinct species which evolved to preserve the DNA of all endangered life forms and recreate extinct species. Leo enlists Zapp Brannigan and Kif Kroker to capture the eco-feminists and Fry infiltrates Leo's empire as a security guard. Fry later runs into Frida and has her take a discreet message of support to Leela, but an unseen Dark One later murders Frida. Farnsworth, Zoidberg and Hermes are captured by the eco-feminists (now joined by Amy, LaBarbara Conrad and others), who commandeer the Planet Express ship. Fry and Leela arrange a rendezvous which is ambushed by the eavesdropping Zapp in the Nimbus. The eco-feminists are captured and sent to prison. Fry learns from the Legion that the Dark One will be present at the implosion of the violet dwarf and is sent to thwart it using an Omega Device. Meanwhile, Leela and the other eco-feminists are sent to prison, but are broken out by Bender and taken by the Planet Express employees to stop the implosion ceremony. At the ceremony, Fry tries to identify the Dark One among everyone else present through its unreadable mind, but finds no one and concludes he must be the Dark One since his mind is unreadable. Leela and the others arrive and to disrupt the ceremony, but Fry convinces Leela to let him proceed. He activates the Omega Device to destroy himself, but it instead affects Leela's leech, which reveals itself as the Dark One. The violet dwarf system turns into a sperm and enters the star, which develops into an adult Encyclopod. The Dark One kills Hutch, who removes the ring from Fry's brain as his dying act, depriving Fry of his telepathy. The Encyclopod destroys the Dark One and leaves after preserving humanity's DNA. Zapp tries to have everyone arrested, and they go on the run. The Planet Express crew encounters a wormhole and decides to enter it, not knowing where it will lead them. Fry and Leela profess their love for each other and kiss as the ship enters. Guest stars: Seth MacFarlane as Mars Vegas Singer, Phil Hendrie as Frida Waterfall, Hutch Waterfall and The Encyclopod, Penn Jillette as himself and Snoop Dogg as himself

== Reception ==
IGN had mostly positive reviews on the four DVD movie releases of the season.

== Home releases ==
Futurama: The Collected Epics
Release Dates			Set Details
			A boxset containing the four Futurama feature-length DVD releases in their entirety.
Region 1	Region 2	Region 4	A boxset containing the four Futurama feature-length DVD releases in their entirety.
—N/a	October 19, 2009	November 4, 2009	A boxset containing the four Futurama feature-length DVD releases in their entirety.

Futurama: Bender's Big Score
Set details			Special features
Feature length episode; 1.78:1 aspect ratio; Languages: English (Dolby Digital 5.1); Subtitles: English SDH; French; Spanish			Optional commentary, by Matt Groening, David X. Cohen, Billy West, John DiMaggio, Phil LaMarr, Claudia Katz, Dwayne Carey-Hill and Ken Keeler.; "Futurama Returns!" - live comic book reading by the Futurama cast; "Everybody Loves Hypnotoad" - full-length episode featuring Hypnotoad; Deleted storyboard scenes; "A Terrifying Message From Al Gore" - animated promotion for An Inconvenient Truth, featuring Bender and Al Gore (optional commentary); "Bite My Shiny Metal X" - Futurama-based math lecture; 3D models/3D turnarounds; "The Script: Original First Draft"; New character/design sketches; Original 5-minute Comic-Con promo; Futurama: The Beast With A Billion Backs preview; Ken Keeler sketch easter egg
DVD release dates
Region 1	Region 2	Region 4	
November 27, 2007	April 7, 2008	March 5, 2008	

Futurama: The Beast with a Billion Backs
Set details			Special features
Feature length episode; 1.78:1 aspect ratio; Languages: English (Dolby Digital 5.1); Subtitles: English SDH; French; Spanish			Optional commentary, by Matt Groening, David X. Cohen, Billy West, John DiMaggio, Maurice LaMarche, Michael Rowe, Claudia Katz, Peter Avanzino and Lee Supercinski; "Futurama: The Lost Adventure" - A long-lost, full-length adventure taken from cinematics of the Futurama video game; Optional commentary, by Matt Groening, David X. Cohen, Billy West, John DiMaggio, Maurice LaMarche, Michael Rowe, J. Stewart Burns and Lee Supercinski; Storyboard animatic - The Beast With A Billion Backs, Part 1; Deleted scenes; "Meet Yivo!" featurette with David Cross; "Blooperama: The Futurama Cast At "Work""; 3D Models with animator discussion; "A Brief History Of Deathball" featurette; Bender's Game preview; "Old Farmer's Wikipedia" easter egg.
DVD release dates
Region 1	Region 2	Region 4	
June 24, 2008	June 30, 2008	August 6, 2008	

Futurama: Bender's Game
Set details			Special features
Feature length episode; 1.78:1 aspect ratio; Languages: English (DTS-HD Master Audio 5.1) (Blu-ray only); English (Dolby Digital 5.1) (DVD only); Subtitles: English SDH; French; Spanish			Optional commentary, by Matt Groening, David X. Cohen, Billy West, John DiMaggio, Tress MacNeille, Michael Rowe, Claudia Katz and Dwayne Carey-Hill; Storyboard animatic - Bender's Game, Part 1; "Futurama Genetics Lab"; "D&D&F (Dungeons & Dragons & Futurama)" featurette; "How to Draw Futurama in 83 Easy Steps" featurette; 3D Models with animator discussion; Deleted scene; "Blooperama 2" cast outtakes from Bender's Game; "Bender's Anti-Piracy Warning" featurette; "Into The Wild Green Yonder" preview; Billy West line attempt easter egg; "David X. Cohen's Dodecahedron Collection" easter egg
DVD release dates
Region 1	Region 2	Region 4	
November 4, 2008	November 3, 2008	December 10, 2008	
Blu-ray Disc release dates
Region A	Region B Europe	Region B Australia	
November 4, 2008	November 3, 2008	December 10, 2008	

Futurama: Into the Wild Green Yonder
Set details			Special features
Feature length episode; 1.78:1 aspect ratio; Languages: English (DTS-HD Master Audio 5.1) (Blu-ray only); English (Dolby Digital 5.1) (DVD only); Subtitles: English SDH; French; Spanish			Optional commentary, by Matt Groening, David X. Cohen, John DiMaggio, Maurice LaMarche, Patric M. Verrone, Michael Rowe, Lee Supercinski and Peter Avanzino.; Storyboard animatic - Into The Wild Green Yonder, Part 1; "Docudramarama" featurette; "Louder, Louder!" featurette on the acting technique of Penn Jillette; "Golden Stinkers" - deleted scenes; "Matt Groening and David X. Cohen in Space!" featurette; "How to Draw Futurama in 10 very difficult steps" featurette; 3D Models, with animator discussion; "Bender's Movie Theatre Etiquette" featurette; "Zapp Brannigan's Guide To Making Love At A Woman" featurette; Toilet paper animation easter egg.; Zapp Brannigan speech easter egg
DVD release dates
Region 1	Region 2	Region 4	
February 24, 2009	February 23, 2009	March 4, 2009	
Blu-ray Disc release dates
Region A	Region B Europe	Region B Australia	
February 24, 2009	February 23, 2009	March 4, 2009	
