= Futurama: The Beast with a Billion Backs =

- DVD cover
- Directed by: Peter Avanzino
- Screenplay by: Eric Kaplan
- Story by: Eric Kaplan; David X. Cohen
- Produced by: Lee Supercinski; Claudia Katz
- Starring: Billy West; Katey Sagal; John DiMaggio; Tress MacNeille; Maurice LaMarche; Phil LaMarr; Lauren Tom; David Herman; Dan Castellaneta; David Cross; Stephen Hawking; Brittany Murphy
- Edited by: Paul D. Calder
- Music by: Christopher Tyng
- Production companies: The Curiosity Company; 20th Century Fox Television (Note: Credited as "30th Century Fox Television".)
- Distributed by: 20th Century Fox Home Entertainment
- Release date: June 24, 2008
- Running time: 89 minutes
- Country: United States
- Language: English

Futurama: The Beast with a Billion Backs is a 2008 American direct-to-video adult animated science-fiction film based on the animated series Futurama, and the second of four straight-to-DVD films that make up the show's fifth season. The film was released in the United States and Canada on June 24, 2008, followed by a UK release on June 30, 2008 and an Australian release on August 6, 2008. The title refers to a euphemism for sexual intercourse—"the beast with two backs". Comedy Central aired the film as a "four-part epic" on October 19, 2008. The movie won an Annie Award for "Best Animated Home Entertainment Production".

== Plot ==
A month after the universe was ripped open, people decide to go on with their lives. Amy and Kif get married. Fry starts dating a girl named Colleen, but breaks up with her when he discovers she has many other boyfriends.

At a conference, Professor Farnsworth proposes an expedition to investigate the anomaly. When Bender explores the anomaly, his touch causes it to emit a shock wave that sends him and the ship flying. Farnsworth discovers that only living beings can pass through the anomaly; electrical objects are either repelled or destroyed. His plans for another expedition are rejected in favor of a military assault led by Zapp Brannigan, which results in Kif's death while Fry enters the anomaly. On the other side of the anomaly, Fry comes across a colossal, one-eyed, tentacled alien named "Yivo" which begins forcing its appendages through the anomaly. Yivo's tentacles touch everyone in the universe, and nothing can stop them since they are made of "electro-matter", which can only be harmed by other electro-matter.

Fry returns to Earth with Yivo's tentacle attached to the back of his neck and tells everyone to "love the tentacle". Yivo's tentacles attach themselves to nearly everyone, causing their victims to fall in love with it, eventually leaving Leela as the only one unattached. Fry becomes the pope of a religion established to worship Yivo. Leela examines Yivo's tentacle fragment and discovers that they are actually reproductive organs, revealing this to everyone at a universal religious gathering. Yivo admits that mating with everyone in the universe was its original intention but claims that it is now truly in love with them. As a sign of good faith, Yivo resurrects Kif who is heartbroken to discover that while he was dead, Zapp capitalized on Amy's grief and slept with her. Yivo begins the relationship anew and removes its tentacles from everyone.

Yivo takes everyone in the universe out on a date at the same time, which goes well. However, the universe's leaders feel that Yivo has made no commitment and send a delegation to break up with it. Before they can do so, Yivo proposes marriage and they accept. Bender becomes frustrated from being neglected by Fry and makes a deal with the Robot Devil for an army of robots to take over the world in exchange for his first-born son, with Robot Devil being genuinely shocked over how callous it was. His attack is made unnecessary when humanity leaves Earth willingly to live on Yivo, along with the other civilizations of the universe, leaving Bender lonely and stagnates the robot population, who are built to serve humans. The universe's residents promise Yivo that they will never contact other universes. Fry, however, cannot help writing a letter to Bender, which is sent without Yivo's knowledge.

Bender receives Fry's letter, which is made out of electro-matter, and decides to rescue his friend from his relationship with Yivo. He and his army harpoon Yivo from the other side of the anomaly and tow it into their own universe. Fry convinces Bender to spare Yivo, but Yivo discovers that the robots' weapons are lined with the electro-matter from Fry's letter, allowing them to harm it. Since Fry broke his promise, Yivo breaks up with the universe and makes everyone leave. Yivo finds consolation with Colleen, and they begin a relationship as they return to the other universe and close the anomaly.

Fry decides to find love elsewhere and tries to ask Leela out, but she rejects him, angered at him using her as a rebound from Colleen. Kif and Amy's relationship is strained due to Amy's affair with Zapp. Bender breaks up his friends' quarrel and assures them that what they experienced was not love, since love is (in his own words) "a jealous, hard-to-obtain emotion that does not share itself with the world". Bender shares his love for Fry and Leela by giving them a big hug, which chokes them.

== Cast ==
- Billy West as Philip J. Fry, Professor Farnsworth, Dr. Zoidberg, Zapp Brannigan, Additional voices
- Katey Sagal as Leela
- John DiMaggio as Bender, Additional voices
- Tress MacNeille as Additional voices
- Maurice LaMarche as Kif Kroker, Calculon, Hedonismbot, Additional voices
- Phil LaMarr as Hermes Conrad, Billionairebot, Additional voices
- Lauren Tom as Amy Wong, Additional voices
- David Herman as Dr. Wernstrom, Additional voices
- Dan Castellaneta as The Robot Devil
- David Cross as Yivo
- Stephen Hawking as Himself
- Brittany Murphy as Colleen O'Hallahan

== Features ==
=== Opening ===
Futurama's common opening sequence and opening caption are present in the film as in all its episodes, though unlike the first film the opening sequence is not extended for a cast list. The opening subtitle reads "The proud result of prison labor" and the opening cartoon consists of a short black-and-white cartoon after the normal sequence. However, rather than immediately crash through the large television billboard, the Planet Express Ship is absorbed by it and is transformed into an appropriately animated black-and-white version of itself. The cartoon to which they're transported is a spoof of Steamboat Willie starring Zoidberg, Leela (in the Mickey role), Fry, and Bender. The Planet Express Ship then flies by the moon and zaps the Hydroponic Farmer from "The Series Has Landed" with the ship's ray gun. Following the cartoon, the Planet Express Ship crashes out from the television billboard.

In the Comedy Central broadcast, the opening sequence is shortened to remove the entire scene where the Planet Express crew flies by the moon. In the opening sequence of the second part, the opening subtitle reads "It Makes a Nice Sandwich", and the third part's opening subtitle is "0100100001101001", which is the binary representation of the ASCII encoding of the word "Hi", and the fourth part's opening subtitle is "The Robots are Coming! The Robots are Coming!". The opening cartoon of the first part is the 1931 Flip the Frog cartoon The Soup Song, while the opening cartoons for the last three parts is the same one seen in "The Devil's Hands Are Idle Playthings", that of Futurama's own opening sequence.

=== Guest stars ===
The film features voice talents from: Brittany Murphy as Colleen, Fry's new polyamorous girlfriend; David Cross as Yivo, the planet-sized tentacled omnipotent alien; Professor Stephen Hawking reprising himself, this time as his own head in a jar; and Dan Castellaneta reprising his role as the Robot Devil. Aside from her regular work on the animated series King of the Hill, this was Murphy's last voice-over role before her death on December 20, 2009.

=== DVD ===
The DVD features a commentary track, deleted scenes, and footage animated for the Futurama video game retitled Futurama: The Lost Adventure. The Lost Adventure also features its own commentary track.
