= Patric Verrone =

American television writer (born 1959)

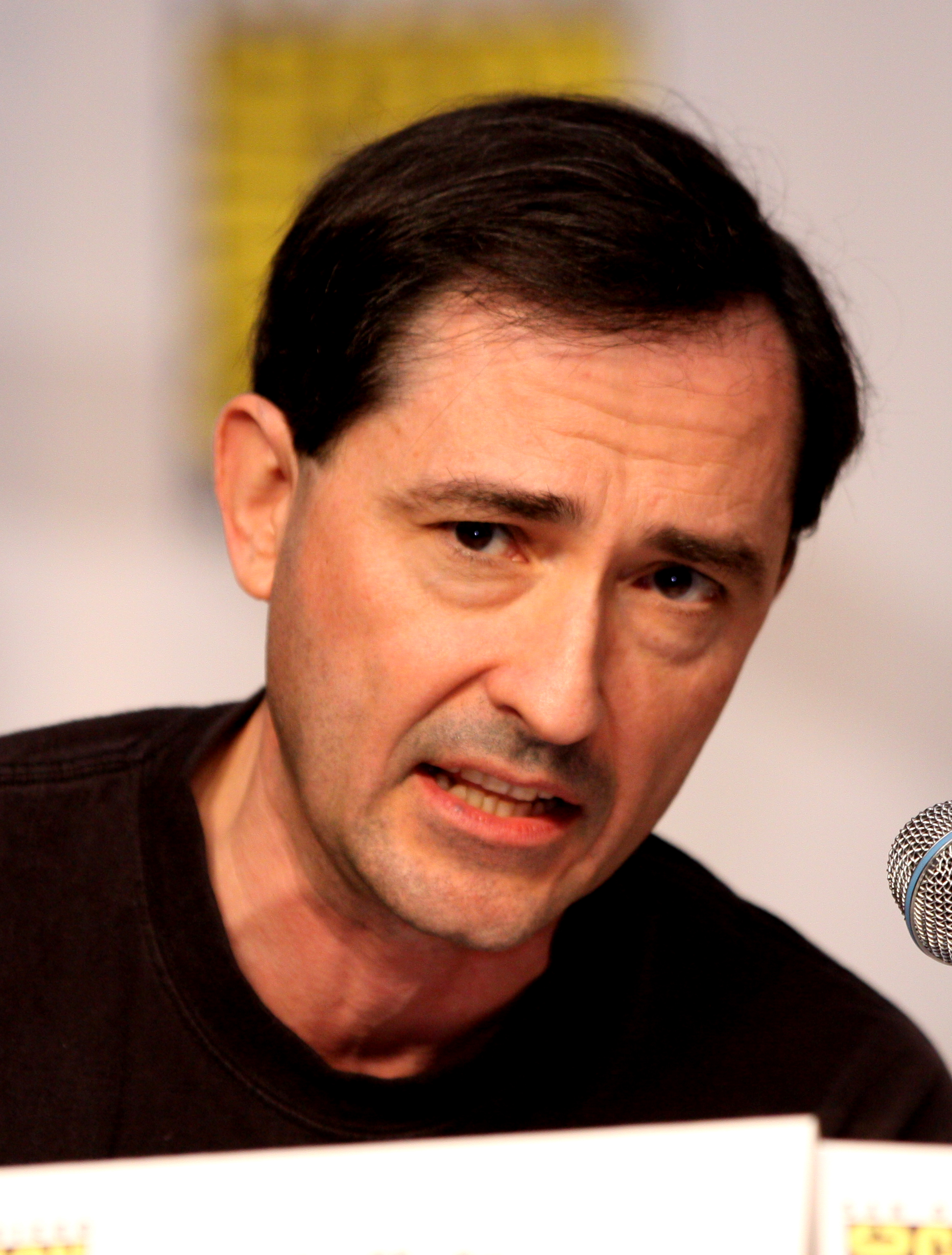
- Verrone at the 2010 Comic Con in San Diego.
- Born: September 29, 1959 (age 66); Glendale, Queens, New York, U.S.
- Education: Harvard College; Boston College (JD)
- Occupations: President of Writers Guild of America, West; Television writer Historical figurine sculptor
- Spouse: Maiya Williams (m. 1989)
- Children: 3

Patric Miller Verrone (born September 29, 1959) is an American television writer and labor leader. He served as a writer and producer for several animated television shows, most notably Futurama.

== Schooling and pre-television career ==
Verrone graduated magna cum laude from Harvard College in 1981 where he was an editor of the Harvard Lampoon. He graduated from Boston College Law School in 1984 after serving as editor of the Boston College Law Review. He practiced law in Florida and California before becoming a television writer.

== Career in television ==
Verrone began his career as a variety show writer, which included a late 1980s job as a monologue writer for The Tonight Show Starring Johnny Carson. Shortly after his work on The Tonight Show, Verrone wrote for the popular animated program Rugrats in 1991. From there, he worked for the entirety of The Critic's run on television, before moving on to write for Muppets Tonight (for which he won an Emmy) and Pinky and the Brain. Eventually, Verrone became a major contributor for Futurama. Subsequently, he wrote an episode of The Simpsons ("Milhouse of Sand and Fog" (2005)), developed the Cartoon Network series Class of 3000 (including writing the pilot episode Home (2006)), and co-executive produced all four feature-length Futurama direct-to-DVD movies.

=== The Critic ===
While editor of The Harvard Lampoon, Verrone met writers Al Jean and Mike Reiss. Jean and Reiss, who had recently served as co-show runners for The Simpsons, were creating a new animated show called The Critic. They asked Verrone to work on it and, as he says, "[He] could hardly refuse."

While working on two seasons of The Critic, Verrone would serve as co-producer and writer of three episodes:

- "A Pig Boy and His Dog"
- "All the Duke's Men"
- "I Can't Believe It's a Clip Show"

=== Futurama ===
Verrone has written for Futurama since the first season. The fourth season episode "The Sting," written by Verrone, garnered nominations for an Emmy Award, Annie Award and a Writers Guild of America Award. In the original series, Verrone served as producer for fifty-nine episodes, but has been co-executive producer since the series' fifth season. Verrone has also scripted seven issues of Futurama Comics, published by Bongo Comics.

Verrone's writing credits for Futurama include:

- "A Fishful of Dollars" 1ACV06 (1999)
- "I Second That Emotion" 2ACV01 (1999)
- "A Clone of My Own" 2ACV10 (2000)
- "The Problem with Popplers" 2ACV15 (2000) – teleplay; story by Darin Henry
- "That's Lobstertainment!" 3ACV08 (2001)
- "A Leela of Her Own" 3ACV16 (2002)
- "The Sting" 4ACV12 (2003)
- "Bender's Game (Part 4)" 5ACV12 (2008) – teleplay with David X. Cohen
- "Attack of the Killer App" 6ACV03 (2010)
- "Lrrreconcilable Ndndifferences" 6ACV11 (2010)
- "Ghost in the Machines" 6ACV19 (2011)
- "Decision 3012" 7ACV03 (2012)
- "31st Century Fox" 7ACV11 (2012)
- "Saturday Morning Fun Pit" 7ACV19 (2013)
- "The Impossible Stream" 8ACV01 (2023)
- "Beauty and the Bug" 9ACV04 (2024)
- "The Futurama Mystery Liberry" (9ACV09 (2024) – segment: Wikipedia Brown Steps in a Clue
- "The White Hole" AACV10 (2025)
- "Lord Nibbler in the Nothingverse" BACV07 (2026)

== Writers Guild of America, West ==
On October 23, 2002, The Animation Writers Caucus (AWC) of the Writers Guild of America, West awarded Verrone a Lifetime Achievement honor of the Animation Writing Award.

In 2005, Verrone was elected president of the Writers Guild of America, West with 68 percent of the vote, after pledging to devote up to 30 percent of the Guild's budget to organizing writers in reality television, animation, cable, and independent film. He had previously served as secretary-treasurer for the organization and on the board of directors.

Reelected president with more than 90 percent of the vote in September 2007, Verrone subsequently led the Writers Guild through a strike from November 5, 2007, to February 12, 2008.

Verrone could not seek reelection in 2009 due to term limits under union rules. John Wells, a former WGAw president from 1999 to 2001, won the election to succeed him. In 2011, Verrone ran for a third term for president, and lost to Chris Keyser by a 20 percent margin. In 2013, Verrone ran for and was elected to a seat on the union's board of directors.

In 2019, Verrone was on the negotiating committee for the "WGA-Agency Agreement", and joined other WGA members in firing his agents as part of the guild's stand against the ATA after the two sides were unable to come to an agreement on a new "Code of Conduct" that addressed the practice of packaging.

== Historical figurines business ==
Aside from his work with the WGA and on television, Verrone also sculpts, paints, and sells historical figurines. His LinkedIn bio states:

I spend eight hours a day running a Hollywood labor union, eight hours making a living writing and producing television animation or sculpting and selling historical figurines on eBay, leaving eight hours to eat, sleep, and spend time with my wife and kids.

The figurines are made to match sets made by Louis Marx and Company in the 1950s and 1960s.

Verrone has crafted the associate justices currently serving on the U.S. Supreme Court, as well as all the other Chief Justices, and a few historically significant and recent justices. He says his long term intention is to create a figurine of each of the 110 justices in the Court's history.

He also has sculpted figurines of the eight U.S. Presidents that Marx never made, every major party presidential nominee since 1944, and a series of famous American figurines including Benjamin Franklin, Alexander Hamilton, Mark Twain, and Frederick Douglass.

== Personal life ==
In 1989, Verrone married television writer and novelist Maiya Williams. They have three children and live in Pacific Palisades, California.

== Political candidacy ==
In March 2014, Verrone became a candidate for California State Senate in SD 26 on the west side of Los Angeles. Other candidates included former assembly member Betsy Butler and women's reproductive rights advocate Sandra Fluke. Verrone lost in the primary to Ben Allen (D) and Sandra Fluke (D).
