= 31st Century Fox =

- Futurama episode
- Episode no.: Season 7 Episode 11
- Directed by: Edmund Fong
- Written by: Patric M. Verrone
- Production code: 7ACV11
- Original air date: August 29, 2012

Guest appearance
- Patrick Stewart as Fox Huntmaster

Episode features
- Opening caption: Today's Episode Brought To You By The Letter [alien letter O]

Episode chronology
← Previous "Near-Death Wish"	Next → "Viva Mars Vegas"
- Futurama season 7

"31st Century Fox" is the eleventh episode in the seventh season of the American animated television series Futurama, and the 125th episode of the series overall. It originally aired on Comedy Central on August 29, 2012. The episode was written by Patric M. Verrone and directed by Edmund Fong.

== Plot ==
After a mission in which the uniforms of the Planet Express crew are ripped to shreds by a gigantic moth, Professor Farnsworth and Hermes agree to buy new ones. They pay a visit to a clothing store and buy a set of uniforms commissioned by the professor a year ago, but were never picked up, complete with the Planet Express logo. Bender purchases fox hunting attire and joins a hunting club, dragging Fry and Leela along with him. Leela protests the injustice of such an activity, much to the dismay of the Master of the Hunt (voiced by Patrick Stewart) and other club members. It is revealed that the fox they are hunting is actually a robot, as are the hunting dogs and horses, leading Bender and Leela to launch a protest movement called B.A.R.F. (Bender's Animal Robot Front), culminating in attempts to legally abolish the injustice against robotic animals.

Though B.A.R.F. succeeds in banning the butchering of robotic animal flesh and liberating robotic chickens from laying eggs as they were designed to, they fail to outlaw robot foxing via injunction due to the judge being a member of the hunting club. Bender kidnaps the next robot fox to be hunted and takes its place in the cage. The fox is taken back to Planet Express and quickly becomes popular with the crew, until it rips apart their new uniforms, kills Amy's beloved chicken, scratches Fry in the face, tears up Leela's sign and flees, prompting Fry and Leela to hunt it.

Bender is discovered with the fox hunt about to start. His plan backfires as the Master of the Hunt makes Bender the new target of the hunt. He flees into the forest and meets with the robot fox, which assists him out of a leg trap by chewing off his foot. They evade several traps laid by the hunters and catch the Master of the Hunt. Fry and Leela catch up to them as Bender is poised with a rifle aimed at the Master of the Hunt, though Bender ultimately declines to kill him.

The Master of the Hunt reclaims the rifle and is about to shoot Bender, but the robot fox attacks and kills him, revealing the Master himself to be a robot. This prompts Bender to state that robot-on-robot violence is OK.

== Reception ==
The A.V. Club gave this episode, in conjunction with the episode "Naturama," a B.

This episode had 1.352 million viewers and a 0.8 rating in the (18-49) demo.
