= A Farewell to Arms (Futurama) =

- Futurama episode
- Episode no.: Season 7 Episode 2
- Directed by: Raymie Muzquiz
- Written by: Josh Weinstein
- Production code: 7ACV02
- Original air date: June 20, 2012

Episode features
- Opening caption: Ask your doctor if Futurama is right for you

Episode chronology
← Previous "The Bots and the Bees"	Next → "Decision 3012"
- Futurama season 7

"A Farewell to Arms" is the second episode in the seventh season of the American animated television series Futurama, and the 116th episode of the series overall. It originally aired on Comedy Central on June 20, 2012 directly after "The Bots and the Bees". The episode was written by Josh Weinstein and directed by Raymie Muzquiz. The episode received a WGA Award nomination. In the episode, an ancient Martian prophecy predicts the end of civilization in the year 3012.

== Plot ==
Professor Farnsworth launches a weather balloon to gather data on a series of recent, bizarre weather patterns on Earth. Fry ties his "lucky pants" to the balloon by mistake, so he shoots the balloon down and sends his pants down to Central Park on Earth, whereupon they are stolen by a Central Park Badger and dragged down a burrow. As the Planet Express crew go down the burrow to get them (with Leela breaking her leg when Fry tries to save her from falling), they stumble upon an ancient Martian pyramid and a large stone calendar. Amy translates the ideograms on the calendar, as she is somewhat familiar with the Martian language, and concludes that the world will end in 3012, the current year. Farnsworth reviews the data from the weather balloon and finds that the Sun is about to release a giant solar flare that will destroy the planet.

An electromagnetic storm causes all electronic devices on Earth to stop working, including spaceships, preventing evacuation from the planet. However, Amy learns through the calendar that the pyramid is actually a giant stone spacecraft able to hold 30,000 people. As they try to use the spacecraft for themselves, the Planet Express crew are caught by Zapp Brannigan and brought before President Richard Nixon's Head. President Nixon's Head insists that a decision-making machine called the Choose-Matron be used to select the most optimal cross-section of humanity to take to Mars, where they will restart human civilization. Fry is chosen because of his "lucky pants", while Leela is rejected since Zapp has been chosen to pilot the craft. Before boarding can begin, Fry disguises his boarding ticket as one for Leela and gives it to her while he remains behind on Earth with Bender (who purposefully remains behind to take part in the looting).

After reaching Mars, the evacuated humans are greeted by Leo and Inez Wong. Back on Earth, the remaining humans begin looting, as does Bender (going so far as to even steal from his own apartment). The escapees on Mars construct a new city called Dick Francisco, as well as a memorial statue for those who were left behind on Earth. They are then approached by the Martian Chief Singing Wind (who has returned to Mars to retrieve his possessions after abandoning his planet in "Where the Buggalo Roam"). Chief Singing Wind clarifies that the calendar foretells the destruction of Mars, not Earth, as the solar flare will bypass Earth and hit Mars; the calendar was created to warn the Earthlings to stay away from Mars. Because Zapp had disassembled the stone ship to construct the memorial statue, the humans on Mars are unable to escape. The solar flare bypasses Earth and strikes Mars, igniting the gases in the planet's crust, which propel Mars towards Earth. As Mars closes within hundreds of feet of Earth's surface, the escapees safely jump off of Mars and back onto their home planet. However, Leela is unable to jump due to her broken leg. Fry tries to grab Leela atop the Planet Express building as Mars passes by, but both only manage to tear off one of each other's arms. Scruffy rescues Leela off-screen using a ladder. With Mars still in Earth's orbit, Professor Farnsworth uses the birth machine from "Rebirth" to make new arms for Fry and Leela while their severed arms float off into space, still holding each other's hands.

== Cultural references ==
- The episode's title is taken from the Ernest Hemingway novel A Farewell to Arms. It is used to refer to Fry and Leela's arms getting torn off in the episode.
- The episode is a parody of the 2012 phenomenon and the film 2012.
- The way that characters jump between Mars and the Earth is reminiscent of the Italo Calvino sci-fi short story The Distance of the Moon from his work Cosmicomics.
- The way Fry found the lettering amidst flammable grease is a reference to a death scene in the film Saw.
