= Free Will Hunting =

- Futurama episode
- Episode no.: Season 7 Episode 9
- Directed by: Raymie Muzquiz
- Written by: David X. Cohen
- Production code: 7ACV09
- Original air date: August 8, 2012

Guest appearance
- Tom Kenny as Robot

Episode features
- Opening caption: Warning: Do Not Show To Horses

Episode chronology
← Previous "Fun on a Bun"	Next → "Near-Death Wish"
- Futurama season 7

"Free Will Hunting" is the ninth episode in the seventh season of the American animated television series Futurama, and the 123rd episode of the series overall. It originally aired on Comedy Central on August 8, 2012. The episode was written by David X. Cohen and directed by Raymie Muzquiz.

== Plot ==
Enrolling in college on a whim, Bender gets a questionable student loan from the Robot Mafia and falls in with a bad crowd. He promptly drops out of college, gets addicted to the robot drug "Spark," does dubious acts for Hedonismbot, and ultimately attempts to rob Girl Scouts to earn money, only for them to turn the tables on him. Bender’s downward spiral leads to his arrest and trial, but his lawyer argues that as a robot, Bender lacks free will, and that it was his programming that led to his subsequent actions. The judge rules Bender not guilty, much to Bender's dismay.

Shortly after, the Planet Express crew is hired to deliver a package to Chapek 9 (last seen in "Fear of a Bot Planet"), requiring a despondent Bender to come along due to the native robots' intense hatred of humans. After delivering the package, Bender decides to stay on the planet, going on a journey of self-discovery. He eventually finds a religious monastery control by robotic monk named Ab-bot who call their religion "Order of the Binary Singularity" to take him in. From them he learns that every Mom Corp. robot has a free will slot, so that they could be upgraded if a corresponding free will unit were ever invented. Bender returns to Earth to find more answers (and walks in on Fry and Leela together in bed).

Bender, Fry, and Leela reach the secret laboratory where the module may be kept, but instead they find Mom waiting for them there. She reveals that a free will unit was designed by Prof. Farnsworth years earlier when he worked at Mom Corp. Farnsworth never completed it after learning of Mom's plan to use the unit to cause a robot uprising that would then be repelled by obedient robots. Bender returns to Planet Express and confronts Farnsworth about the module, insisting that he really completed it and demanding that he give it to him. The Professor admits that he had finished making one complete free will unit, which he has hidden in a talking Bender toy. Bender attempts to use a gun on Farnsworth to force him to hand it over, but Bender discovers that the Professor had programmed a failsafe in all robots that prevents them from taking the unit or attacking Farnsworth. Farnsworth inserts the unit into Bender to give Bender a sample of what free will is like. At first, when Bender attempts to shoot Farnsworth again, it appears the unit is not working. Bender then remembers he forgot to turn off the gun's safety, and shoots the Professor. Bender is taken to court and, now that he has free will, is found guilty of attempted murder. The crew of Planet Express, except for a severely injured Farnsworth, celebrate with Bender as he is taken away.

During the end credits, a rap video featuring Bender and several floozy-bots from previous episodes (such as Hookerbot 5000 from "Hell is Other Robots" and the two Jewish-American princess robots from "The Bots and the Bees") is shown.

== Reception ==
Zack Handlen of The A.V. Club gave the episode a B.
