= Viva Mars Vegas =

- Futurama episode
- Episode no.: Season 7 Episode 12
- Directed by: Frank Marino
- Written by: Josh Weinstein
- Production code: 7ACV12
- Original air date: August 22, 2012

Episode features
- Opening caption: Made By Hand (And Tentacle)
- Opening cartoon: "Child Labor Syndicate Presents: 'Colorama: In Glorious Black and White'"

Episode chronology
← Previous "31st Century Fox"	Next → "Naturama"
- Futurama season 7

"Viva Mars Vegas" is the twelfth episode in the seventh season of the American animated television series Futurama, and the 126th episode of the series overall. It originally aired on Comedy Central on August 22, 2012. The episode was written by Josh Weinstein and directed by Frank Marino. Its opening sequence is constructed from plastic, cardboard, and model ships that "fly" on wires and rods.

== Plot ==
The Robot Mafia holds up an armored car in space and steals $8 million in cash, but jettisons it into a dumpster on Earth when the police give chase. Meanwhile, the Planet Express crew takes a vacation to Mars, planning to stay at Leo and Inez Wong's hotel and casino. Amy suggests that Doctor Zoidberg stay behind, given how poor he is. Disappointed, Zoidberg climbs into a dumpster, only to have the robbery money fall into his lap.

On Mars, Amy explains that her parents built their fortune thanks to her ancestor, Sir Reginald Wong, who swindled the native Martians out of their land. The Native Martians now work in the casino. She takes them on a tour of the high-security money room and its vault, patrolled by a blind Martian security guard named Blind Joe whose keen sense of smell alerts him to Bender's attempt to steal some cash. Zoidberg arrives, surprising the crew, and quickly turns his $8 million into more than $10 billion at the roulette tables. His next bet loses, costing him everything, but he tells the shocked crew that he has enjoyed himself and helped everyone else have a little fun as well.

Returning to the dumpster on Earth, he is confronted by the Robot Mafia, who threaten to kill him unless he returns the money. He escapes by squirting cephalopod ink on them and himself and running away. At Planet Express, as the crew recovers from a severe hangover, Professor Farnsworth uses a laser to make the ink in Fry's new facial tattoo invisible. A misfire hits Zoidberg, turning him invisible because of the ink covering his body. On Mars, the Robot Mafia forcibly takes over all of the Wongs' properties, leaving the family broke and homeless. Amy realizes that Zoidberg's invisibility gives them a chance to rob the casino and return it to its rightful owners.

The crew sneaks Zoidberg into the vault, using a batch of spoiled shrimp from the casino buffet to cover his natural body odor and foil Blind Joe. Zoidberg quickly swallows all the cash he can grab, along with a small box that, according to Amy, is "the most valuable thing of all." The crew hurries to get him out as he starts to belch up the cash, but they are caught at the door by Blind Joe. Amy retrieves the box and opens it to reveal a document signed by Sir Reginald, which returns the land to its rightful owners (the Martians) after 100 years. Because that time has long since passed, Blind Joe and the Martians take ownership of the casino and throw the Robot Mafia out. In gratitude, they give the Wongs' ranch and a second casino back to them.

== Reception ==
Zack Handlen of The A.V. Club gave the episode a B, preferring the four previous episodes over it.

"Viva Mars Vegas" had 1.071 million viewers and a 0.6 rating in the (18-49) demo. It was the highest-rated show on Comedy Central that night.
