= The Silence of the Clamps =

- Futurama episode
- Episode no.: Season 6 Episode 14
- Directed by: Frank Marino
- Written by: Eric Rogers
- Production code: 6ACV14
- Original air date: July 14, 2011

Episode features
- Opening caption: No refunds

Episode chronology
← Previous "The Futurama Holiday Spectacular"	Next → "Möbius Dick"
- Futurama season 6

"The Silence of the Clamps" is the fourteenth episode in the sixth season of the American animated television series Futurama, and the 102nd episode of the series overall. It originally aired July 14, 2011 on Comedy Central. The episode was written by Eric Rogers and directed by Frank Marino. In the episode, Bender witnesses a brutal "clamping" committed by the Robot Mafia and is forced into witness protection after his identity is accidentally revealed. Meanwhile, Clamps, a member of the Robot Mafia, takes Bender's old job at Planet Express in an attempt to get information as to Bender's whereabouts.

From May 22 to May 23, and again on June 17, as part of its "Countdown to Futurama" event, Comedy Central Insider, Comedy Central's news outlet, released various preview materials for the episode, including storyboards, concept art and a preview video clip of the episode. "The Silence of the Clamps" received mixed reviews from critics, who praised the use of Dr. Zoidberg's character, but criticized the choice of Clamps as its main focus.

== Plot ==
While delivering an item for the Donbot's eldest daughter's wedding, Bender sneaks onto the mansion grounds to take part in the festivities. He secretly makes out with the Donbot's younger daughter Bella when he witnesses the Robot Mafia viciously beating Calculon for welching. Being the only witness of the attack, Bender is forced to testify in open court where he is recognized by Bella, who blurts out her decision to marry him, while Calculon is threatened by the Robot Mafia into testifying in favor of the Donbot's innocence.

Now targeted by the Robot Mafia for ratting out the Donbot and for his affair with Bella, Bender is forced to go into witness relocation, leaving Planet Express to begin hiring for his replacement. Determined to hunt down Bender, the Donbot sends Robot Mafia member Clamps to apply for Planet Express under his real name, Francis, in order to befriend Fry and make him reveal Bender's location. However, he is unsuccessful and earns the resentment of Zoidberg, who fears that Clamps's masterful use of his clamp-like hands will overshadow the use of his own pincers, the only part of Zoidberg's job that he is tolerated for.

The Planet Express crew makes a delivery to the Moon where they find a robot they believe to be Bender, who claims his name is Billy West and does not seem to remember any of them, his memory seemingly erased as part of the witness relocation program. This does not stop Clamps from attempting to kill Billy, but he is stopped by Zoidberg, who uses his pincers to cut off his clamps. However, Bella arrives and shoots Billy to death, accusing him of cheating on her since he is shown to be married to the Crushinator. The crew returns to Earth to mourn Bender's apparent death at a pizzeria near the Planet Express building. There they find Bender working as a waiter, revealing himself to still be under witness protection there, and realize that Billy was a different robot. With the Robot Mafia believing Bender to be dead, Bender is free to continue working at Planet Express.

== Production ==
The episode was written by Eric Rogers, and directed by Frank Marino. The episode serves as Rogers' first solo writing credit for the series; Rogers had previously co-written the season two episode "Anthology of Interest", and is also a frequent writer for the series' accompanying comic book series.

As a part of its "Countdown to Futurama" event, Comedy Central Insider, Comedy Central's news outlet, released various preview materials for the episode. On May 22, concept art of the Crushinator, a returning character that originally debuted in the season one episode "The Series Has Landed", was released; the next day, storyboards of a courtroom scene in the episode were released. On June 17, a preview clip from the episode was released.

== Cultural references ==
The title is a reference to the 1991 film The Silence of the Lambs. The wedding scenes in the episode's first act were inspired by the 1972 crime film The Godfather; the Donbot's mansion is modelled after the mansion from the film's 1974 sequel, The Godfather Part II. The 1979 song "Clampdown" by English punk rock band The Clash is played over a montage of Clamps and Fry spending time together. The robot that the Planet Express crew meet on the Moon, Billy West, is named after the voice actor of the same name, Billy West, who voices various Futurama characters, including primary characters Fry, Dr. Zoidberg and The Professor. The Futurama staff were amused by this reference. One of the villains, say "In space, no one can hear you clamp." A reference to the tagline of Alien, "In space, no one can hear you scream.

== Reception ==
In its original U.S. broadcast, "The Silence of the Clamps" scored a 0.7 share among adults 18-49 and 1.406 million viewers, down about 150,000 viewers from the previous week's episode "Law and Oracle".

The episode received mixed reviews from critics. Zach Handlen of The A.V. Club wrote: "...this is more like everybody goofing off, and I enjoy watching that a lot more." He described the episode as "weirdly put together, [...] messy and occasionally half-assed", but that he nonetheless laughed throughout, praising scenes such as Zoidberg and Clamps' showdown. He noted that he felt the episode was an improvement over the week's previous episode "Law and Oracle", giving the episode an overall B+ rating.

Robert Canning of IGN was more critical of the episode, describing it as the "first clunker of the summer" and writing: "...there were still a few laugh-out-loud bits in the half hour, but as Futurama episodes go, [it] was just a little too straightforwardly bland." He criticized the episode for what he felt was a rehash of plot elements, such as a character leaving Planet Express, similarly explored in the episode "Ghost in the Machines" by Fry, as well as not having much "hilariously memorable moments." Praise was given, however, to Zoidberg's character. Giving the episode a 7/10 rating, he concluded his review of the episode by describing it as "simply too unremarkable." Sean Gandert of Paste described the episode as "forgettable", writing: "I think the main problem I ended up having with this episode is that aside from locations being on the moon and characters being robots, which have no real effect, this is a story that could have been done in any sit-com." He also criticized the episode for focusing on Clamps, who he describes as "probably the least interesting character in its universe" and a "one-joke character". He did praise some elements of the episode, such as its individual jokes, Bender's performance, and references to older elements of the show such as the Space Pope and the Family Bros. pizza parlor. In spite of these, however, Gandert, giving the episode a 6.6/10 rating, felt that "the foundation was weak, making for the first forgettable episode this season."

Maurice LaMarche, who regularly voices Kif Kroker, Clamps, Donbot, Calculon, Morbo, The Hyperchicken, Hedonismbot and The Crushinator, won his second consecutive Emmy for outstanding voice-over performance for this episode.

Eric Rogers was nominated for a Writers Guild of America Award for Outstanding Writing in Animation at the 64th Writers Guild of America Awards for his script to this episode.
