= Futurama: Bender's Big Score =

2007 film by Dwayne Carey-Hill

- DVD cover
- Directed by: Dwayne Carey-Hill
- Screenplay by: Ken Keeler
- Story by: Ken Keeler; David X. Cohen
- Produced by: Lee Supercinski; Claudia Katz
- Starring: Billy West; Katey Sagal; John DiMaggio; Tress MacNeille; Maurice LaMarche
- Edited by: Paul D. Calder
- Music by: Christopher Tyng
- Production companies: The Curiosity Company; 20th Century Fox Television (Note: Credited as "30th Century Fox Television".)
- Distributed by: 20th Century Fox Home Entertainment
- Release dates: November 27, 2007 (United States); March 5, 2008 (Australia); April 7, 2008 (United Kingdom)
- Running time: 89 minutes
- Country: United States
- Language: English

Futurama: Bender's Big Score (or Bender's Big Score) is a 2007 American animated science fiction action comedy film based on the animated series Futurama. It was released in the United States on November 27, 2007. It was the first Futurama production since the original series finale "The Devil's Hands are Idle Playthings". Bender's Big Score, along with the three follow-up films, comprise season five of Futurama, with each film being separated into four episodes of the broadcast season. Bender's Big Score made its broadcast premiere on Comedy Central on March 23, 2008. The film was written by Ken Keeler, based on a story by Keeler and David X. Cohen, and directed by Dwayne Carey-Hill.

Special appearances include Coolio as Kwanzaa-bot, Al Gore as himself, Mark Hamill as Chanukah Zombie, Tom Kenny as Fry's older brother Yancy, and Sarah Silverman returning as Fry's ex-girlfriend Michelle (having previously voiced the role in "The Cryonic Woman").

== Plot ==
Two years after Box Network executives cancel Planet Express's contract, the executives are fired and Planet Express is back "on the air." As the crew celebrates, Hermes is decapitated, causing his wife LaBarbara to leave him. His head is placed in a jar while his body is repaired. Lars, who performs the procedure, flirts with Leela, much to Fry's chagrin.

During a delivery to a nude beach planet, Leela discovers a tattoo of Bender on Fry's buttocks. Three alien scammers—Nudar, Fleb and Schlump—obtain the crew's personal information and infect Bender with an obedience virus, allowing them to seize control of Planet Express. The scammers discover that Fry's tattoo has a code that allows time travel into the past. Nibbler warns the scammers against using the code but is ignored.

Bender destroys New York while being pursued by Swedish authorities in 2308, one of the many moments of continuity with previous episodes

The scammers have Bender use the code to steal valuable objects from Earth's past and a doomsday device from Professor Farnsworth, storing them in a cave beneath the Planet Express building. Hermes has Bender retrieve an earlier version of his body so he can win back his wife. Leela and Lars date, further depressing Fry.

Once the scammers have history's treasures, they decide to eliminate the time code by killing Fry. Fry uses the code to escape to January 1, 2000, just after he was frozen. (Note: As depicted in "Space Pilot 3000".) The scammers send Bender after him. Bender arrives before Fry, creating a duplicate of himself when he has to use the bathroom. Another Bender from "way at the end" appears, opens Fry's cryogenic tube and puts the tattoo on his butt. When Fry arrives, the first Bender duplicate inadvertently initiates a self-destruct due to not going to the bathroom. Fry shoves that Bender into another tube, then escapes. The original Bender spends twelve years hunting Fry before seemingly killing him by blowing up his apartment.

Bender reports his success to the scammers, who erase the time code and the virus. The crew holds a memorial for Fry, but he suddenly appears. Fry says he created a duplicate of himself, which remained in the past while he accidentally fell into his cryo-tube alongside his original 2000 self. Awaking one-thousand years later, the present Fry froze himself until the current year. The Fry duplicate spent the years before Bender's attack working at Panucci's Pizzeria, then at an aquarium caring for Leelu, an orphaned narwhal. Nibbler removes the tattoo from Fry to prevent further abuse from the scammers. Leela and Lars decide to marry, but during the wedding, Hermes is again decapitated. Farnsworth says that Hermes' body would have died anyway, as time paradox duplicates are doomed to die prematurely; Lars panics and leaves Leela.

The scammers trick Earth President Richard Nixon into giving Earth to them. Exiled to Neptune, the population assembles a fleet alongside their allies and enemies. Hermes has his brain wired into the ship's battle computer, allowing him to destroy the scammers' fleet and win LaBarbara back. When the scammers threaten to destroy the Planet Express ship with the doomsday device unless the crew surrender; Bender reveals to the crew that he had stolen the device back from the scammers for his own use. Leela then fires the device, destroying the scammers' ship.

Fry arranges for Leela and Lars to reconcile at the cryogenic lab. Having survived the attack, Nudar ambushes them. Lars tricks Nudar into approaching the Bender duplicate on self-destruct and holds them down as the duplicate explodes, killing them. The explosion reveals the Bender tattoo on Lars, revealing him as the Fry duplicate who survived Bender's attack in 2012 and froze himself to return to the future and be with Leela; he ultimately canceled the wedding to spare Leela the pain of his death as a time paradox duplicate.

Bender removes Lars' tattoo and travels to 2000 to place it on Fry in the cryogenic tube so that the events that transpired "make any sense at all". Upon returning, Bender explains that he convinced all the duplicates of himself from his stealing sprees to stay with him, instead of leaving "when they were logically supposed to." Nibbler urges everyone to evacuate the universe before swallowing himself. The Bender duplicates explode, causing a tear in the fabric of space.

== Cast ==
- Billy West as Philip J. Fry, Professor Farnsworth, Dr. Zoidberg, Zapp Brannigan, God Entity, President Richard Nixon's Head, Lars Fillmore, Inuit #1, Silly Willy Wideo Will Guy
- Katey Sagal as Leela
- John DiMaggio as Bender Rodríguez, Robot Santa, Barbados Slim, Mr. Panucci, Elzar, Sal, Constantine, Curly Joe
- Tress MacNeille as Linda, Dr. Cahill, Dr. Shlavinowitz, Turanga Munda, Tinny Tim, Hattie McDoogal, Leela's Wrist Thingy, Bender's Computer
- Maurice LaMarche as Schlump, Kif Kroker, Don Cunningham, Hedonismbot, Morbo, H.G. Blob, Donbot, Clamps, Leelu, Cyrogenist, Leroy, Inuit #2, Charles de Gaulle's Head, Headless Body of Agnew
- Phil LaMarr as Hermes Conrad, Ethan "Bubblegum" Tate, Dwight Conrad, Philip Joshua Fry
- Lauren Tom as Amy Wong, Philip J. Fry II
- David Herman as Nudar, Scruffy, Turanga Morris, Terry, Father Changstein El-Gamal, Nude Bartender, Sweet Clyde, Phillip Fry, 21st Century Newscaster
- Dawnn Lewis as LaBarbara Conrad
- Kath Soucie as Cubert Farnsworth
- Frank Welker as Nibbler, Fleb, Seymour
- Coolio as Kwanzaa-bot
- Al Gore as Himself
- Mark Hamill as Chanukah Zombie
- Tom Kenny as Yancy Fry, Jr.
- Sarah Silverman as Michelle

== Production ==
After the show's cancellation, 20th Century Fox Television approached the crew about doing direct to video films, they initially said two films, but the crew suggested three films and eventually settled on four films. In February 2007, Futurama co-creator Matt Groening addressed speculation as to whether Futurama had been revived in episodic or feature film form, explaining that the crew is "writing them as movies and then we're going to chop them up, reconfigure them, write new material and try to make them work as separate episodes". A preview of the film was shown at Comic-Con 2007. It was also reported at Comic-Con that once the movie is "chopped up" it will be reconfigured into four episodes that will be broadcast on Comedy Central on March 23, 2008. The same will be done with the succeeding three movies, creating a sixteen-episode fifth season. The voice recording finished on July 3, 2007. An official trailer was released on October 10, 2007.

=== Music ===
In addition to the background musical score, the movie contains two original "movie musical" style songs by Ken Keeler that the characters perform in context. The song "I May As Well Jump" (also referred to as "Street Song") exposited the dissatisfaction of most of the characters with the ways their lives were progressing at that point in the plotline, except for Lars and Leela, who were contrastingly delighted to announce their happiness and their upcoming marriage. The song "This Trinity's Goin' to War" (also referred to as "This Toyshop's Goin' to War") exposited the plans of Robot Santa, Chanukah Zombie, and Kwanzaa-bot to provide military support to assist in the liberation of Earth. The movie also contains a cover of Scott Walker's "30 Century Man" performed by The Jigsaw Seen.

== Release ==
Bender's Big Score made its broadcast premiere on Comedy Central on March 23, 2008. The film was broken into four separate episodes which served as the first part of Futurama's fifth season, followed by The Beast with a Billion Backs, Bender's Game, and Into the Wild Green Yonder. The TV movie was screened in the United Kingdom on Sky1, which started airing Bender's Big Score on October 26, 2008. After being aired in four separate episodes, the next three movies were aired, with each of them being broken up into four episodes; creating a fifth season comprising 16 episodes overall. Bender's Big Score aired in Canada on October 12, 2008 on the Global Television Network.

In the broadcast premiere, the extended opening from the film is placed before the scene where Hermes is decapitated as opposed to after it. The first two scenes in the montage of Leela and Lars' dates were cut. The original opening subtitle "IT JUST WON'T STAY DEAD!" is kept as the opening subtitle of the first part. The three additional opening captions are: "Watch, Rinse, Repeat", "Apply directly to the foreclaw" (a reference to HeadOn), and "Last Known Transmission of the Hubble Telescope." The billboard scene in all four is identical to the single scene in the film, a snippet from "Space Pilot 3000" where Fry gets frozen.

=== Home media ===
Futurama: Bender's Big Score is the first carbon-neutral DVD to be released by 20th Century Fox. The studio worked to reduce the carbon impact of DVD manufacture and distribution. It also features "A Terrifying Message From Al Gore", an animated short produced to promote guest star Al Gore's film An Inconvenient Truth, a discussion on the use of mathematics in Futurama, and a full length audio commentary by cast and crew members. There is also a 22-minute full length episode of "Everybody Loves Hypnotoad". It was released in 16:9 widescreen format; the first 16:9 presentation of any Futurama media.

== Reception ==
In its first week, the DVD sold 222,036 units, for a total of $3,994,428. As of July 24, 2008, The Numbers reports DVD sales stand at 920,023, for a total of $16,662,212.

The film holds a 100% rating on Rotten Tomatoes, based on 11 reviews, with an average rating of 7.40/10. It won the 2007 Annie Award for Best Home Entertainment Production. The movie received an "A" rating in a review at UGO, calling its two musical numbers "hilarious", and the overall quality on par with that of the show's original run. Dan Iverson of IGN gave the movie an 8 out of 10, stating that "it is easy to recommend Bender's Big Score to fans of the series and those new to the show alike". They also gave the DVD a seven out of ten, praising the extras but lamenting the quality of the video transfer.

== Torgo's Executive Powder ==
Torgo's Executive Powder is an elaborate running gag throughout the film in retaliation against the Fox Network for its alleged mishandling and eventual cancellation of Futurama. The product is said to have "a million and one uses" and consists of ground-up executives, including those of the film's thinly veiled Fox Network parody (the Box Network), and makes repeated appearances due to its miraculous utility in such diverse tasks as seasoning, surgery, delousing, feeding heads in jars, cosmetics, bomb disposal, artillery, and the care of head transplant patients. In the "Everybody Loves Hypnotoad" episode released with the film, Torgo's Powder is advertised as a parody of HeadOn, stating "Torgo's Powder: apply directly to the buttocks" three times in the same fashion. When the film was aired on Comedy Central, a fake commercial was shown preceding the first break in which a woman dumps some of the powder in a toilet. It appears once in Bender's Game on Fry and Bender's kitchen counter, when Bender is washing a pot and is about to jump out of the window.
