= Zoich =

Proposed Olympic mascot

- The design of Zoich
- First appearance: September 10, 2010
- Created by: Yegor Zhgun
- Based on: Hypnotoad

In-universe information
- Species: Frog
- Nationality: Russian

Zoich (Cyrillic: Зойч, pronounced [zojtɕ]) was a proposed mascot for the 2014 Winter Olympics from the official online mascot poll. Throughout the online voting, it was the most popular mascot from those submitted. It took around 40 minutes for Zoich to be voted to the top spot. The committee decided not to introduce it to the final round of the voting.

Zoich was example of guerrilla marketing, as the artist was commissioned by the Sochi 2014 Olympic and Paralympic Organizing Committee to create a mascot which would serve as a promotion for the competition. In a June 2011 statement from the president of Committee, it was revealed that Zoich was not a genuine independent entry into the competition.

== Background and creation ==
On September 1, 2010, The Organizing Committee of the 2014 Sochi Winter Olympic and Paralympic Games, in conjunction with the newspaper Izvestia, announced an open online competition to select the mascots for the 2014 games. The competition received 24,048 entries from across Russia and Russians abroad. On September 10, 2010, Moscow artist and designer Yegor Zhgun entered with an original sketch of an imaginary frog, naming it "Zoich". According to its author, the idea of Zoich was influenced by the character Hypnotoad from the show Futurama.

Zoich was commissioned specifically to serve as a fake "protest vote" and to become a viral Internet meme, which it succeeded in. Prior to the reveal that Zoich was commissioned by the Sochi 2014 committee, it had become a popular political symbol among activists in the 2009–2010 Kaliningrad protests, being used to represent the corruption of the Russian government.

The registration of intellectual rights to Zoich by the Sochi 2014 Organizing Committee was revealed on June 14, 2011. The idea that Zoich was not a legitimate independent entry to the competition was deemed so far-fetched that it required statements from the Sochi 2014 Organizing Committee and Zhgun to convince journalists of its legitimacy.

== Description ==
Zoich is a fuzzy blue frog. The Olympic Rings rotate in its eyes, taking the role of pupils: black, yellow, and blue in the right eye and red and green in the left. In its mouth, the frog holds a ski pole and a Russian Imperial Crown sits atop its head. The mascot takes its name from the year "2014" as it is represented on the Olympiad's logo: The numbers 2, 0, and 1 as they are represented look like the Latin Z, O, and I. The number 4 looks like the Russian letter Ч, which is like the English "ch".

== See also ==
- Fatso the Fat-Arsed Wombat
- List of Olympic mascots
