= Fun on a Bun =

- Futurama episode
- Episode no.: Season 7 Episode 8
- Directed by: Stephen Sandoval
- Written by: Dan Vebber
- Production code: 7ACV08
- Original air date: August 1, 2012

Episode features
- Opening caption: 50% More Colors Than Bargain-Brand Cartoons

Episode chronology
← Previous "The Six Million Dollar Mon"	Next → "Free Will Hunting"
- Futurama season 7

"Fun on a Bun" is the eighth episode in the seventh season of the American animated television series Futurama, and the 122nd episode of the series overall. It originally aired on Comedy Central on August 1, 2012. The episode was written by Dan Vebber and directed by Stephen Sandoval. Additional Oktoberfest music was provided by polka band Brave Combo. When the team attends an Oktoberfest, Fry discovers that the traditions he is familiar with have changed and rebels, Bender enters a sausage-making contest, and Leela deals with an apparent loss.

== Plot ==
Professor Farnsworth takes the Planet Express crew to Germany for Oktoberfest. Fry is disappointed to discover that the celebration has become much more refined since the 20th century, and he gets intoxicated and performs "The Chicken Dance", embarrassing his fellow workers, particularly Leela, who breaks up with him. Meanwhile, Bender discovers that Elzar is there, ready to win the sausage-making challenge using pork that has been aged over 3000 years. Bender is determined to win the event, and takes a despondent Fry with him in the Planet Express ship to look for woolly mammoths frozen in a nearby glacier within Neander Valley, believing that meat aged over 30,000 years should certainly win. Bender is successful at finding a woolly mammoth, and with Fry's help, proceeds to grind the woolly mammoth into sausages. Bender is unaware when Fry appears to fall into the grinder. Later, as the rest of the crew tastes Bender's sausages, they find traces of Fry's hair and clothing, and assume he has been killed and made into sausage meat. Leela is so upset that she decides to have all of her memories of Fry removed from her explicit memory. The Planet Express crew do their best to avoid mentioning Fry to Leela after this process.

A flashback shows that Fry had managed to pull himself out of the shredder in time, losing his clothes and a little bit of hair in the process. He then falls down a deep pit, hits his head, and is partially frozen. Fry is soon discovered by a lost society of Neanderthal cavemen and other prehistoric animals that have lived within the glacier for more than 30,000 years. These Neanderthals were long ago driven into exile by the then emerging Homo sapiens. The fall, having given Fry both amnesia and an enlarged Neanderthal-like brow, leaves him unaware of his past, and he joins the tribe. He and Leela see certain objects that remind them both of each other, though they still cannot remember who the other is. Fry soon convinces the Neanderthals to return to the surface through a hole found in the ice.

At Oktoberfest, Bender is dissatisfied that his mammoth sausage only won third place. Fry leads the Neanderthals out of the pit, and they attack the attendees of Oktoberfest with woolly mammoths, a woolly rhinoceros, and a Megatherium (which moves slowly towards Hermes). Bender uses the chaos of the attack to secretly dispose of the chefs that won first and second place, so that he can be the first-place winner. Zapp Brannigan tries to attack from his ship only for the Neanderthals to catapult a saber-toothed cat into the ship, causing it to crash. The battle culminates with Fry and Leela having a face-off on the deck of the Planet Express Ship. The pair, still lacking memories of each other, nevertheless make peace with each other and embrace in a kiss. The two warring sides are inspired by this act of affection and decide to end the conflict before Fry and Leela's memories are fully restored.

A new and much-less-refined Oktoberfest celebration is restarted and the episode ends as Fry sits back while Leela performs the "Chicken Dance", allowing her to embarrass him for a change.

== Cultural references ==
- The episode is mainly set in a futuristic Oktoberfest, which has evolved into a highbrow event.
- The futuristic Oktoberfest is located in the Neander Valley which is located in the German state North Rhine-Westphalia; the real Oktoberfest is held in Munich, Bavaria.
- Leela's visit to the memory eraser Annie's Forgettery parodies the premise of Eternal Sunshine of the Spotless Mind, where the character Clementine (Kate Winslet) visits a clinic called Lacuna, Inc., to erase the memories of her relationship with Jim Carrey's character Joel.
- The episode includes two original songs by Denton, Texas-based nuclear polka band Brave Combo plus a cover version of "The Chicken Dance".
- Sight gag at end celebration feast, referring to the closing credits of The Flintstones with large order of 'Ribs' served including the table tipping over.
- Bender receives a message via raven in a reference to Game of Thrones with Scruffy playing the part of a Maester of the Citadel.
- Two weeks after the show was aired, a scientific debate was raised about whether the early homo-sapiens have mated with Neanderthals or not, due to recent discoveries.
- When amnesiac Fry & Leela are fighting each other on the Planet Express Ship, Fry's neanderthal garb and fighting style are that of San's first appearance in Princess Mononoke. Fry and Leela's not knowing each other at that moment, their underlying attraction to each other, and engaging each other in a fight, are additional themes inspired from Princess Mononoke's protagonist and hero.
- Fry leads the Neanderthal assault while riding on a mammoth, referencing Hannibal's invasion of Rome with war-elephants.

== Reception ==
Zack Handlen from The A.V. Club gave the episode a B grade. Max Nicholson of IGN an 8/10 "Great" rating, stating the episode was one of the most memorable of the season.
