= Near-Death Wish =

- Futurama episode
- Episode no.: Season 7 Episode 10
- Directed by: Lance Kramer
- Written by: Eric Horsted
- Production code: 7ACV10
- Original air date: August 15, 2012

Guest appearances
- Estelle Harris as Velma Farnsworth

Episode features
- Opening caption: There's No Bismuth Like Show Bismuth

Episode chronology
← Previous "Free Will Hunting"	Next → "31st Century Fox"
- Futurama season 7

"Near-Death Wish" is the tenth episode in the seventh season of the American animated television series Futurama, and the 124th episode of the series overall. It originally aired on Comedy Central on August 15, 2012.

The episode was written by Eric Horsted and directed by Lance Kramer.

== Plot ==
Fry wishes he had relatives other than Professor Farnsworth to bond with. The Planet Express crew discovers that Farnsworth's parents moved to the Near-Death Star, in which inhabitants are connected to pods that keep their minds entertained in a virtual reality simulation.

Fry, Leela, and Bender find Farnsworth's parents, Ned and Velma. Fry accidentally disrupts the equipment, setting off the security alarms. Leela connects Ned and Velma to the group's hovercart to power it and escape the pursuing guards.

Farnsworth claims he wants nothing to do with his parents, but spies on them as they enjoy activities with Fry. Farnsworth tells Leela and Amy that when he was growing up, his parents never played with him or paid attention to his scientific discoveries. The family moved to a farm in the countryside, further limiting Farnsworth's ability to study, and he never forgave them. Distraught, he flees into the countryside and takes shelter at the now-rundown farm.

After finding him, Ned and Velma explain that they moved to protect Farnsworth from the same fate as their first son. That son's scientific curiosity got him into trouble on several occasions. For his sake, they first moved to the farm; he would suffer night terrors and would only be calmed when his parents read to him from science books. Later, they committed him to a mental institution and never saw him again. Ned and Velma claim they did not want their second child, Floyd, to suffer this fate as well – whereupon Farnsworth realizes that they believe him to be Floyd. Hubert J. Farnsworth, the first son, was committed but later released from the institution. Bender tells the group about the earlier arrival of a man named Floyd who claimed to be related to Farnsworth, but Fry tells Bender not to take attention from Farnsworth. Farnsworth realizes that his parents neglected him because they were exhausted from dealing with his night terrors. Understanding that his parents always loved him, he reconciles with them.

Ned and Velma ask to be taken back to the Near-Death Star to escape the pain of their physical bodies, and Fry promises to visit. Once they are reconnected, Farnsworth reprograms their simulation to present the country farm in its prime and revert them to a younger age. Plugging himself in, he creates an image of himself as a child so he can play with them.

== Reception ==
Zack Handlen from The A.V. Club awarded the episode an A.

The episode had 1.179 million viewers and a 0.6 rating in the (18-49) demo. This tied The Daily Show with Jon Stewart in the 18-49 demo as the highest rated Comedy Central show for the night.
