= Naturama (Futurama) =

- Futurama episode
- Episode no.: Season 7 Episode 13
- Directed by: Crystal Chesney-Thompson
- Written by: Eric Rogers (The Salmon); Michael Saikin (The Pinta Island Tortoise); Neil Mukhopadhyay (The Elephant Seal)
- Production code: 7ACV13
- Original air date: August 29, 2012

Episode features
- Opening caption: Tell Your Parents It's Educational

Episode chronology
← Previous "Viva Mars Vegas"	Next → "Forty Percent Leadbelly"
- Futurama season 7

"Naturama" is the thirteenth episode in the seventh season of the American animated television series Futurama, and the 127th episode of the series overall. It originally aired on Comedy Central on August 29, 2012. The episode was written by Eric Rogers, Michael Saikin and Neil Mukhopadhyay, and directed by Crystal Chesney-Thompson.

== Plot ==
The characters are featured in a nature documentary show called "Mutual of Omicron's Wild Universe," divided into three segments. They appear as different animals in each segment with voice-over narration.

=== Part 1: The Salmon ===
The characters are depicted as salmon, with the exception of Zoidberg, who appears as a lobster. Fry and Leela, born in different rivers, meet after swimming out to sea, and Leela rejects Zapp Branigan and promises to mate with Fry when they come of age. However, since they must instinctually return to the rivers where they were hatched in order to mate, they are forced to separate. Before Zapp can fertilize Leela's eggs, he is caught and eaten by Brrr, a grizzly bear version of Lrrr. Fry jumps out of his river and over to Leela's, but is stuck on the land adjacent to it. He too is caught by Brrr, who reluctantly lets him go after the bear version of Ndnd argues with him over eating too much fish. Fry reaches Leela and fertilizes her eggs, and both die happily along with all the other salmon.

=== Part 2: The Pinta Island Tortoise ===
Professor Farnsworth, as a rare Pinta Island tortoise named Lonesome Hubert, is persuaded by his animal friends to find a mate so his species can continue. The female tortoise he is interested in lives on the other side of the island, an 18-month journey. Once Hubert arrives, he mistakenly begins to mate with a large, tortoise-shaped boulder until the real tortoise (resembling Mom) shows up and angrily knocks it down a hill. She has been waiting for Hubert, and the two mate but later part ways after she lays three eggs. Several months later, these hatch into tortoise versions of Walt, Larry and Igner and promptly fall down the hill, where the boulder rolls over and crushes them, leading to the species' extinction.

=== Part 3: The Elephant Seal ===
The alpha male of an elephant seal colony (Bender) mates freely with dozens of females, while the less virile males are unable to attract mates. Kif gets Amy's attention and begins to mate with her while Bender is distracted, but Bender discovers them and scares Kif away. Kif challenges Bender for dominance, only to be quickly crushed to death when they fight. However, the other lesser males have taken advantage of the fight and mated without Bender's knowledge, leading to the birth of several pups that look just like them.

=== Epilogue ===
Following the closing title screen of the documentary and a pitch for Mutual of Omicron ("Have you insured your planet?"), a fleet of spaceships destroys Earth.

== Cultural references ==
- Mutual of Omicron's Wild Universe is a reference to the long-running nature documentary series Mutual of Omaha's Wild Kingdom; the logo containing Lrrr parodies Mutual of Omaha's corporate insignia.

== Reception ==
Zack Handlen of The A.V. Club gave this episode a B+. Max Nicholson of IGN gave the episode an 8.5/10 "Great" rating.

The season finale had 1.365 million viewers and a 0.7 rating in the (18–49) demo.

== See also ==
- Yellow Planet
