= The Six Million Dollar Mon =

- Futurama episode
- Episode no.: Season 7 Episode 7
- Directed by: Peter Avanzino
- Written by: Ken Keeler
- Production code: 7ACV07
- Original air date: July 25, 2012

Guest appearances
- Dan Castellaneta as Robot Devil

Episode features
- Opening caption: This Episode Worth 250 Futurama Points

Episode chronology
← Previous "The Butterjunk Effect"	Next → "Fun on a Bun"
- Futurama season 7

"The Six Million Dollar Mon" is the seventh episode in the seventh season of the American animated television series Futurama, and the 121st episode of the series overall. It originally aired on Comedy Central on July 25, 2012. The episode was written by Ken Keeler and directed by Peter Avanzino.

== Plot ==
Hermes starts performance reviews so that he may rid Planet Express of its worst employee, implying that this will be Zoidberg. Upon completing the review and finding the entire crew lackluster, Hermes realizes that he is the worst-performing employee, spending too much time on reviews. After quitting Planet Express and getting replaced by a robot, a depressed Hermes is attacked by the psychotic robot Roberto, who is arrested and executed.

Hermes visits a black market "upgrade" shop run by Yuri and obtains a robotic upgrade. He finds the upgrade helps to improve his life, and frequents the shop, upgrading his human body despite promises to LaBarbara and Dwight that he will stop. Eventually, he replaces all his human parts except his brain, returns to Planet Express and proves he is more valuable than his robotic replacement. The crew learns that Zoidberg has been getting Hermes' discarded parts and stitched his body into a ventriloquist dummy named Little Hermes, turning it into a comedy act which impresses everyone but offends Hermes, who feels he needs to replace his brain with a computer.

When Yuri refuses to do the brain replacement, Hermes, Professor Farnsworth, and Bender head to the robot graveyard to exhume a robot body for a processor. Unbeknownst to them, the processor belongs to Roberto. For the procedure to work, Hermes locks his family and the Planet Express crew in the lab until Farnsworth completes the transplant. LaBarbara and Hermes' friends convince Farnsworth to stop this, but Zoidberg volunteers to complete the operation using Hermes' human body to help him. After the removal of the brain, LaBarbara is devastated, but Zoidberg reveals that he did it to bring her husband back, placing the brain in Little Hermes. Hermes comes back to life in his original body, realizing that he gave up his humanity for the pointless pursuit of perfectionism. The crew is aghast when Roberto reactivates in his new robot body and reshapes his head. Wanting to eat Hermes' skin, Roberto removes a piece of the skin, but discovers that he cannot tolerate it because of LaBarbara's curried goat, which melts his body. Encouraged by LaBarbara, Hermes thanks Zoidberg for restoring him despite admitting to actually hating him. Upon hearing this, Zoidberg confronts a stunned Hermes for his treatment, saying that Hermes does not deserve him as a friend.

== Reception ==
Zack Handlen of The A.V. Club enjoyed the episode and gave it an A−.

== See also ==
- Ship of Theseus, thought experiment involving rebuilding an object from discarded parts
