= Yellow Planet =

- The Simpsons episode
- Poster of the episode
- Directed by: Timothy Bailey
- Written by: J. Stewart Burns
- Production code: 35ABF20
- Original release date: April 22, 2025

Guest appearance
- Hugh Bonneville as the narrator

Episode chronology
← Previous "P.S. I Hate You"	Next → "Abe League of Their Moe"
- The Simpsons season 36

"Yellow Planet" is the fourth and final special of the thirty-sixth season of the American animated television series The Simpsons, and the 786th episode overall. It was the fourth episode to be released exclusively on the streaming service Disney+ on April 22, 2025. The episode was written by J. Stewart Burns and directed by Timothy Bailey.

In this episode, the Simpsons characters are portrayed as animals in a nature documentary. Hugh Bonneville guest starred as the narrator. The episode was released as a celebration of Earth Day, an annual international event that takes place on April 22.

== Plot ==
A user selects the nature documentary Yellow Planet to stream. In the Arctic in summertime, Homer, a beluga whale, meets Marge, a narwhal, and they fall in love. They separate at the end of summer to migrate. Moe tells Homer to go after Marge. He joins Marge's pod and says his pod was killed by orcas. Her father Rainier Wolfcastle is suspicious.

Meanwhile, in the Galápagos Islands, Bart, an iguana, learns to avoid being eaten by snakes with his fellow iguanas. He finds the snakes cannot see movement, so he pushes away his fellow iguanas to sacrifice them and survives. In Africa, Flanders, a mandrill, and his sons argue about evolution.

Homer and Marge go deep into the ocean to search for food, tearing a spoof of Ursula from The Little Mermaid. After feeding and bringing food to the rest of the pod, they decide to get married until they encounter Homer's pod. Learning he lied, Marge's pod abandons him. Meanwhile, in the Amazon rainforest, Lisa, a woodpecker finch, teaches the others to eat ants by using twigs to draw them out of trees. However, they eat all the ants and trees die, so they go to eat out of a dumpster of an Amazon warehouse. Also, Kirk, a praying mantis, catches Luann eating another male after sex and argues with her, so she decapitates him.

Trying to comfort her, Jacqueline tells Marge that she was once in love with a gray whale but ended things to obey her parents. Marge, not wanting to be like her, decides to look for Homer, who has become a performer at a water theme park. When he hears Marge, who forgives him, he attempts to escape but accidentally kills his human trainer. Homer is released and mates with Marge, giving birth to Maggie who is a narwhal/beluga whale hybrid.

The narrator is then addressed by Morgan Freeman who tells him not to do any documentaries on penguins as he already did March of the Penguins.

== Production ==
In August 2024, it was announced that four original episodes of the series would be released exclusively on Disney+ with this episode announced as one of them. Executive producer Matt Selman described the episode as a parody of the nature documentary series The Blue Planet or a National Geographic documentary with the Simpsons characters as animals.

This is the final episode by release order to feature actress Pamela Hayden.

== Reception ==
John Schwarz of Bubbleblabber gave the episode a 7.5 out of 10. He thought the premise was not original but would have been "solid" for a broadcast episode. He liked writer J. Stewart Burns' script and speculated that the animal concept was made for Disney.

== See also ==
- Naturama
