= The Bots and the Bees =

- Futurama episode
- Episode no.: Season 7 Episode 1
- Directed by: Stephen Sandoval
- Written by: Eric Horsted
- Production code: 7ACV01
- Original air date: June 20, 2012

Guest appearance
- Wanda Sykes as Bev

Episode features
- Opening caption: Not sure if new episode or just rerun of episode I watched drunk

Episode chronology
← Previous "Reincarnation"	Next → "A Farewell to Arms"
- Futurama season 7

"The Bots and the Bees" is the first episode in the seventh season of the American animated television series Futurama, and the 115th episode of the series overall. It originally aired on Comedy Central on June 20, 2012, along with "A Farewell to Arms" as part of an hour long season premiere. The episode was written by Eric Horsted and directed by Stephen Sandoval. Wanda Sykes guest stars as Bev.

== Plot ==
Professor Farnsworth acquires a new robotic soda vending machine named Bev. Fry becomes addicted to the "Slurm Loco" drink she offers, and begins to glow bright green as a side effect. Bender comes to resent Bev since she does not dispense alcoholic beverages, and she soon comes to dislike him as well. The two eventually fight after Bev chases away a pair of fembots Bender tries making out with, though they end up having sex instead. Bev soon gives birth to a baby robot while dispensing a drink for Fry, to Bender's surprise as he had not known about 31st-century robots' ability to procreate. Bender initially rejects his son and attempts to give Bev full custody, but Bev runs away and leaves their child in his care. Bender soon comes to appreciate his son after he takes delight in Bender's bending abilities, and names the child Ben.

Ben grows up under Bender's care and states that he wants to be a bending robot like his father. However, because arm-control software is inherited maternally and Bev has no arms, Ben is unable to bend objects. In addition, he only has one expansion slot, which houses his memory card. Despite this, Bender continues to raise Ben in the hopes that Ben will overcome his disability. During a ceremony celebrating Ben's passage into adulthood, Bev returns and takes custody of her son from Bender. Bender kidnaps Ben and tries to run, but the two are caught by the police when Ben tries and fails to bend a grate at a dam as an escape route. As Bender prepares to return Ben to Bev, she gives birth to another child conceived with Officer URL and decides to keep this child instead, leaving Bender and Ben alone. To fulfill Ben's dream of becoming a bending robot, a tearful Bender allows Farnsworth to replace Ben's memory card with a bending software card, erasing Ben's memories of his childhood and leaving him unaware of Bender's identity. The Planet Express crew fly Ben to a bending university on a foggy night, with the brightly glowing naked Fry strapped to the prow of the Planet Express ship to light the way, in reference to the story of Rudolph the Red-Nosed Reindeer.

== Cultural references ==
The opening caption quote, "Not sure if new episode or just rerun of episode I watched drunk," along with the picture of Fry squinting (taken from the season 2 episode "The Lesser of Two Evils") is a reference to the Futurama Fry internet meme. The meme was also referenced in advertisements for the seventh season leading up to the premiere.

The episode title is a reference to the term the birds and the bees.

After the "relationship" scene with Bev and Bender, the impression left in the wall is a reference to the freezing of Han Solo in carbonite in The Empire Strikes Back.

At the Temple of Robotology where Ben has his Bot Mitzvah, the sign on the building's entrance references the holiday Lag BaOmer.

== Reception ==
The episode received mostly positive reviews from critics. Zack Handlen of The A.V. Club gave the episode a "B+" grade, stating, "It's mean-spirited—and, worse, lazy—to make Bev into the easiest stereotype of a crappy mom, and most of the jokes that come out of that characterization aren't great. Sykes makes the most of the part, but there isn't much to it. Thankfully, the episode is more about Bender and Ben bonding, and Bender turning out to be a doting, supportive father. It's a little sweeter than usual, and somehow, the attempts to undercut that sweetness just make the relationship even more adorable; a montage of father and son spending time together includes petty theft and bank robbery, and yet seems about as wholesome as the show ever gets. But it works, because it's fun to see Bender getting emotionally attached to anything".

Max Nicholson of IGN rated the episode an 8/10, writing, "Overall [...] this was a solid entry for Season 7. The writing is still sharp, and the animation has never looked better. It was also nice to see Bender's character treading a little more ground beyond the traditional backseat one-liners. While Ben would obviously disrupt the balance of the main ensemble, it was a fitting introduction for what could be a recurring character on the show (similar to Cubert or Dwight)."

The writer of the episode, Eric Horsted, was nominated for Outstanding Writing in an Animated Television Production, at the 40th Annie Awards, though he did not win.
