= HeadOn =

Topical product claimed to relieve headaches

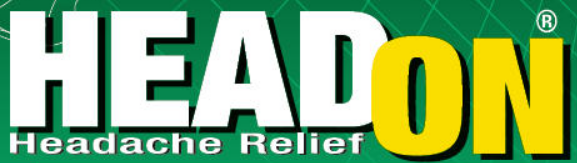
Logo

HeadOn was an American brand of homeopathic topical headache products owned by the Florida-based Miralus Healthcare. The brand achieved notoriety due to a viral 2006 commercial consisting only of the tagline "HeadOn: Apply directly to the forehead" repeated three times. An earlier commercial claimed the product provided headache relief but was pulled after objections from the Better Business Bureau. The commercial garnered widespread criticism for its loudness, lack of information, repetitiveness, and low production values. No clinical trial has ever found evidence for the product's efficacy, and medical experts have widely described it as a placebo.

== Commercial ==
=== Background ===
HeadOn gained notoriety due to its repetitive advertisements on late-night television, including on Wheel of Fortune, re-runs of Seinfeld and The Weather Channel. In March 2006, the National Advertising Division of the Better Business Bureau objected to an older HeadOn commercial that claimed that HeadOn provided headache relief, citing insufficient evidence that the product was effective. The organization threatened to forward the case to the Food and Drug Administration and the Federal Trade Commission. In response, manufacturer Miralus Healthcare removed all factual claims about the product from their commercials.

Miralus Healthcare tested several potential commercials using focus groups; the focus groups reportedly recalled ads with repetition much more than with any other method. Despite the largely negative reception to the commercial, Dan Charron, vice president of sales and marketing at Miralus, stated that nobody in the focus groups had told him that the ads were irritating.

=== Content ===
The portion of the commercial that elicited widespread media and popular attention

The commercial starts by showing a woman applying HeadOn on her forehead against a monochromatic background. The tagline "HeadOn: Apply directly to the forehead" is stated three times in a loud voice while a large yellow arrow points at her forehead. The commercial then cuts to an image of the product's packaging and either states, "HeadOn is available without a prescription at retailers nationwide" or "available at Walgreens" without describing the product or its purpose.

=== Reception ===
Responses to the commercial were largely negative, with The Today Show listing it as the worst commercial of 2006. Seth Stevenson of Slate noted the advertisement's "blunt force" and described it as "mesmerizing in its cheesiness". Kate Wagner of The Baffler compared the actress' expression to a "military commander on a Maoist poster" and described the commercial as both "bizarre" and "unsettling." Wagner further said the commercial was "unlike anything humans would reasonably produce to sell something." Dan Neil, writing in the Los Angeles Times, similarly described the commercial as unique for its lack of information and compared it to North Korean propaganda. Both The Today Show and Ad Age described the commercial as "obnoxious," and multiple reviewers joked that the commercial gave viewers headaches.

The Tonight Show with Jay Leno, Saturday Night Live, and The Daily Show With Jon Stewart parodied the commercial. The 2008 spoof film Disaster Movie included a parody of the commercial, and other parodies were shared on the online video-sharing platform YouTube. Sales for HeadOn dramatically increased after the advertising campaign, doubling sales year-on-year from 2005 to 2006. The commercial has been described as a highly effective marketing campaign, though it is unclear if Miralus Healthcare ever turned a profit.

=== Analysis ===
Herein lies the genius of HeadOn, a product that promises nothing, builds no expectations, disappoints no one. It's the Hillary Clinton of over-the-counter meds.

— Brian Unger, Day to Day

Yale marketing professor Dina Mayzlin argued that the commercial's crudeness and repetitiveness made it an especially effective advertisement. Writing for the Cardozo Law Review, Jeremy Sheff theorized that the ad's repetition was effective because of the tendency for consumers to perceive familiar brands as more beneficial and less risky. Ad Age also suggested that the commercial's camp-like style made it the target of free airtime and parody. Wagner theorized that the unintentional nature of the commercial's absurdist humor made it one of the first and most effective instances of a brand employing absurdist advertising tactics. Both Wagner and Stevenson suggested that the brand's relatively unknown status improved the effectiveness of the ad. In a piece on the Commercial Advertisement Loudness Mitigation Act, The Atlantic described the commercial as a notorious example of a commercial using loudness as an advertising tactic.

== Product ==
HeadOn was distributed by Miralus Healthcare in an applicator similar to a glue stick and sold at five and eight dollars. While Iris versicolor, white bryony, and potassium dichromate have been listed as its active ingredients, the ingredients are in such small dilutions that the product consists almost entirely of wax.

=== Efficacy ===
HeadOn claims to relieve headaches using homeopathy, a pseudoscientific system of alternative medicine based on diluting active ingredients. No clinical trial has shown that HeadOn or any of its active ingredients relieve headaches. While Miralus claims that the product has been studied, no relevant data has ever been released to the public. Medical experts have widely stated that any perceived headache relief from the product results from the placebo effect.

The dilution technique employed by the product leaves only trace amounts of its active ingredients, and no scientific evidence suggests that dilutions are effective in releasing the medicinal properties of any ingredients.

=== Other products ===
Miralus also launched ActivOn in 2006, a similar homeopathic product for arthritis pain, RenewIn, a homeopathic brand of energy pills, and PreferOn, a homeopathic scar treatment cream.
