= Law and Oracle =

- Futurama episode
- Episode no.: Season 6 Episode 16
- Directed by: Stephen Sandoval
- Written by: Josh Weinstein
- Production code: 6ACV16
- Original air date: July 7, 2011

Episode features
- Opening caption: For the sophisticated shut-in

Episode chronology
| ← Previous "Möbius Dick" | Next → "Benderama" |
- Futurama season 6

"Law and Oracle" is the sixteenth episode in the sixth season of the American animated television series Futurama, and the 104th episode of the series overall. It was originally broadcast on July 7, 2011, on Comedy Central. In the episode, Fry leaves his job as a delivery boy at Planet Express and applies for a new job as a police officer. He is eventually promoted to the Future Crimes division, where he is foretold of a crime committed by his best friend Bender that places him in a dilemma that puts his friends' lives in danger.

The episode was written by Josh Weinstein, and directed by Stephen Sandoval. It was inspired by, and makes various cultural references to science fiction media, such as the films Tron (1982), Minority Report (2002) and Avatar (2009). On May 20 and 21, as part of its "Countdown to Futurama" event, Comedy Central Insider, Comedy Central's news outlet, released various preview materials for the episode, including concept art of the Future Crimes division, a storyboard of Fry making a delivery to a cryogenics laboratory and a 30-second preview clip of the episode. "Law and Oracle" received generally positive reviews from critics, who enjoyed its humor, cultural references and the character Chief O'Mannahan, who is introduced in the episode.

== Plot ==
After being sent on a prank delivery, Fry becomes disillusioned with his job at Planet Express. He and his co-workers are held hostage by criminally insane robot Roberto, who is promptly subdued by Smitty and URL, and Fry decides that joining the police force would be a more fulfilling role. He resigns from his job, and applies at the Police Academy, from which he graduates. Upon joining the force, Fry is paired with URL. The pair soon make a major arrest, and are rewarded with a promotion to the Future Crimes division. The division works to prevent crimes from occurring, by using "Pickles", an "oracle" human-robot hybrid who is able to calculate the future and predict crimes in advance.

Meanwhile, Leela and Bender are sent on a delivery to the planet Pandora; however, without Fry accompanying them, the two find it difficult to be in each other's company. Professor Farnsworth, Amy, Hermes and Doctor Zoidberg find working at Planet Express to be boring without Fry's antics. Back at the precinct, Fry receives a vision of a future larceny, and discovers that the culprit is Bender. Fry questions Bender about the details of the crime, hoping to prevent him from committing it, but inadvertently informs Bender about the target of the crime; a priceless bottle of strong malt liquor stored in Hedonismbot's wine cellar. Upon examining the vision in closer detail, Fry sees that he will fatally shoot Bender to prevent him from stealing the bottle. He decides that he will deliberately not shoot Bender, which causes a vision of an alternate future to be created, in which Bender escapes and shares the stolen liquor with the crew at Planet Express, poisoning and inadvertently killing all of them.

Bender arrives at Hedonismbot's mansion and obtains the bottle from the cellar, but is stopped by an armed Fry. Suddenly, Pickles appears, aiming a gun at both Bender and Fry. Pickles reveals that both visions were a set-up to allow himself to steal the liquor and frame Fry and Bender for the robbery. Pickles states that he wants the liquor to destroy his human brain cells, as he finds his precognition to be an unbearable burden. Fry attempts to shoot Pickles, but the invisible safe guarding the liquor ricochets the bullet and strikes Bender, knocking him down. Pickles shoots Fry down, and proceeds to drink the liquor, successfully damaging his brain and precognitive abilities. However, URL and the police chief choose this moment to appear from behind mirrored glass, and Fry and Bender stand up and reveal they became aware of the set-up when Pickles showed Bender sharing the deadly liquor with the Planet Express crew, which is unlikely to happen as Fry pointed out that Bender is extremely selfish and would never share anything (a statement that Bender strongly confirms), thus making the police realize the vision Pickles had shared was an attempt to deceive them.

Fry receives his investigator's shield for stopping Bender and Pickles, but is also fired for tipping off Bender in the first place. The Professor welcomes Fry back to Planet Express, promoting him to "executive delivery boy" at Fry's request. Hermes notes that the "executive" title is simply a psychological trick to "help insecure people feel better about themselves". At that moment, the executive producer credits appear on the screen as Fry says "I feel better about myself!", and the episode ends.

== Production ==
As a reference to the 2009 film Avatar, a sequence in "Law and Oracle" uses anaglyph 3D graphics. Top image: The Planet Express ship lands on the planet Pandora. Bottom image: Bender throws a sandwich in the direction of the viewers.

The episode was written by Josh Weinstein, and directed by Stephen Sandoval. On May 20 and 21, as part of its "Countdown to Futurama" event, Comedy Central Insider, Comedy Central's news outlet, released various preview materials for the episode, including concept art of the Future Crimes division, a storyboard of Fry making a delivery to a cryogenics laboratory and a 30-second preview clip of the episode.

Originally entitled "Frynority Report", the original concept for the episode's plot featured a mysterious man travelling backwards in time, who would eventually be revealed to be Fry and Leela's son. Weinstein and series co-creator David X. Cohen spent time elaborating and working on this concept before the idea was scrapped after the writing staff concluded the plot "wasn't funny enough."

"Law and Oracle" has the first appearance of Chief O'Mannahan, the police chief of the New New York Police Department. Cohen has called her one of his favorite characters of the show's sixth season. An additional backstory between her and her love interest, URL, was scrapped from the episode. The sequence involving Bender and Leela making a delivery to the planet Pandora contains anaglyph 3D graphics, as a reference to the moon of the same name from the film Avatar (2009), a film noted for its similar use of 3D imagery. The 3D graphics used in "Law and Oracle" may or may not work, depending on the type of 3D eyeglasses used by the viewer.

== Cultural references ==
The title of the episode is a parody of the long-running NBC legal drama television franchise Law & Order. The sequences involving Fry's police academy training are references to the Police Academy series of films. One of the robots in Fry's class, the "Sound Effects 5000", is a direct parody of the Police Academy character Sgt. Larvelle Jones (Michael Winslow). The sign in front of the police academy also states that they are not affiliated with the film Police Academy IV (1987). The planet Pandora is a reference to the moon of the same name from the film Avatar (2009). As a reference to the film's heavy use of 3D graphics, the planet itself is depicted as a "3-D planet" where one needs 3D glasses to see properly.

The idea of the "Future Crimes Division" and the Cybernetic Oracle is based on the short story "The Minority Report" by Philip K. Dick (1958), which was adapted into the 2002 Steven Spielberg film Minority Report. The light cycle chase scene featuring Fry and URL is a reference to the 1982 science-fiction film Tron. In the commentary for the episode, the crew revealed that there was much discussion as to whether the sequence should be inspired by "old Tron", the original film, or "new Tron", the film's 2010 sequel, Tron: Legacy. The man being chased in the light cycle scene is Erwin Schrödinger, a 20th-century Austrian physicist known for his Schrödinger's cat paradox.

== Reception ==
"Law and Oracle" was originally broadcast on July 7, 2011, on Comedy Central. In its original American broadcast, "Law and Oracle" was viewed by an estimated 1.548 million viewers. The episode had a 0.7 share among adults 18-49. The episode was down about 400,000 viewers from the previous week's episode, "Ghost in the Machines".

The episode received generally positive reviews from critics. Matt Fowler of IGN was pleased with the episode, noting that though "an episode as crowded as 'Law and Oracle' would fail more than it succeeds", it still, overall, "came together quite nicely." He did, however, feel that the references to Tron and Avatar felt "a little shoe-horned in." He also noted that he felt the episode picked up after Fry's promotion to the Future Crimes division, and also enjoyed the character Chief O'Mannahan. The episode was given an overall rating of 8/10. Sean Gandert of Paste gave the episode a rating of 8.1/10, praising the episode's humor and how the episode "didn't feel like it retread any ground". He noted that though the episode, unlike many other Futurama episodes, was not "fairly thought-provoking beyond all of its laughter" and does not make one think "in the way good sci-fi always has and stretches the limits of logic and our sense of what the world is about", the episode's jokes "[hit] their mark all the way through and were, if not thought-provoking, still pretty clever." He, like Fowler, praised Chief O'Mannahan, calling her "a memorable new character."

However, Zack Handlen of The A.V. Club gave the episode a more negative review and graded the episode C+. He criticized elements of the episode, feeling that the first part of the episode contained "a lot of hackneyed jokes" and also noted that "while the show is more than willing to swing at easy targets, there's something frustratingly perfunctory about the swings they take here." While he felt the writing improved "when the actual plot finally kicked in", he also felt that the overall plot of the episode was "lazy".
