= Dick Francis (illustrator) =

Dick Francis is an artist best known for his Galaxy Science Fiction illustrations during the 1950s and 1960s.

In 1951–53, Francis was illustrating for Amazing Stories, Fantastic Adventures and Galaxy. In the January 1957 issue of Galaxy, Francis illustrated the lead story by Kris Neville, prompting Gabriel Mckee's comment:

It's for Kris Neville's "Moral Equivalent," the lead story in the same issue of Galaxy. The Bible doesn't figure nearly as much in that story as the illustration suggests.

Francis employed a loose, sketchy style that sometimes resembled the illustrational approach of Ed Emshwiller. Unlike Emshwiller, he did not do covers for Galaxy, only interior illustrations. In the January 1954 issue of Galaxy, the interiors were by Francis, Emshwiller, Don Sibley and Sandy Kossin, and editor H. L. Gold employed this core group to illustrate for Galaxy on a regular basis during the 1950s.

Francis also contributed to Gold's Beyond Fantasy Fiction. the fantasy companion magazine to Galaxy, beginning with his illustration for Frederik Pohl's "The Ghost Maker" in the January 1954 issue. For Beyond he also illustrated stories by Theodore R. Cogswell and Reginald Bretnor.
