= List of Futurama characters =

A view of the many secondary and tertiary characters in Futurama, as seen in Futurama: Into the Wild Green Yonder

Futurama is an American animated science fiction sitcom created by Matt Groening and developed by Groening and David X. Cohen for the Fox Broadcasting Company. The series follows the adventures of a late-20th-century New York City pizza delivery boy, Philip J. Fry, who, after being unwittingly cryogenically frozen for one thousand years, finds employment at Planet Express, an interplanetary delivery company in the retro-futuristic 31st century.

Along with the employees of Planet Express, Futurama includes a large array of characters, including co-workers, media personalities, business owners, extended relatives, townspeople, aliens, and villains. Many of these characters were created for one-time gags, background scenes, or other functions, but later gained expanded roles. Other characters started as background characters, and have been used to personify new roles later on in the series.

The main characters are listed first; all other characters are listed in alphabetical order. Only main, supporting, and recurring characters are listed, with brief descriptions of the main and supporting characters also given.

== Overview ==
Character	Voiced by	Seasons													
Character	Voiced by	1	2	3	4	5				6	7	8	9	10	11
Character	Voiced by	1	2	3	4	BBS	TBwaBB	BG	ItWGY	6	7	8	9	10	11
Philip J. Fry	Billy West	Main	Main	Main	Main	Main	Main	Main	Main	Main	Main	Main	Main	Main	Main
Professor Farnsworth	Billy West	Main	Main	Main	Main	Main	Main	Main	Main	Main	Main	Main	Main	Main	Main
Dr. Zoidberg	Billy West	Main	Main	Main	Main	Main	Main	Main	Main	Main	Main	Main	Main	Main	Main
Zapp Brannigan	Billy West	Main	Main	Main	Main	Main	Main	Main	Main	Main	Main	Main	Main	Main	Main
Turanga Leela	Katey Sagal	Main	Main	Main	Main	Main	Main	Main	Main	Main	Main	Main	Main	Main	Main
Bender	John DiMaggio	Main	Main	Main	Main	Main	Main	Main	Main	Main	Main	Main	Main	Main	Main
Amy Wong	Lauren Tom	Also starring	Also starring	Also starring	Also starring	Main	Main	Main	Main	Main	Main	Main	Main	Main	Main
Hermes Conrad	Phil LaMarr	Also starring	Also starring	Also starring	Also starring	Main	Main	Main	Main	Main	Main	Main	Main	Main	Main
Kif Kroker	Maurice LaMarche	Guest	Recurring	Recurring	Recurring	Main	Main	Guest	Main	Main	Main	Main	Main	Main	Main
Nibbler	Frank Welker	Guest	Recurring	Guest	Recurring	Main		Main	Guest	Also starring	Also starring	Also starring			Guest
Mom	Tress MacNeille	Guest	Guest	Guest	Guest	Guest	Guest	Main	Supporting	Recurring	Recurring	Main	Main	Main	Main
Scruffy	David Herman	Guest	Guest	Recurring	Recurring	Supporting	Supporting	Supporting	Supporting	Also starring	Also starring	Main	Main	Main	Main

== Main characters ==
Primary characters from left to right as seen in "I Dated a Robot": Hermes, Bender, Professor Farnsworth, Fry, Leela, Zoidberg and Amy

=== Philip J. Fry ===
Philip J. Fry (voiced by Billy West), primarily known by his surname Fry, is the main protagonist of the series. He is a 20th-century pizza delivery boy in New York City who, after getting dumped by his girlfriend and being stuck in a dead-end job, is cryogenically frozen on December 31, 1999, waking up 1000 years later just before the year 3000. After meeting Leela and Bender, the trio find employment at the Planet Express delivery company, owned by Fry's distant descendant Professor Farnsworth. Ironically, Fry becomes the delivery boy for Planet Express after rejecting his predetermined job of being a delivery boy upon waking up in the future. Fry is a goofy, dim-witted, slovenly but well-meaning individual. The series follows his transition from the 20th century to the 31st century.

Billy West used an impression of his own voice at age 25 to create Fry's voice.

=== Turanga Leela ===
Turanga Leela (voiced by Katey Sagal) is the female lead of the series. She is a one-eyed mutant who Fry meets after waking up 1000 years in the future. Originally working as a career assignment officer for cryo-preserved people waking up in the future, Leela quits her job after meeting Fry, joining him and Bender at Planet Express where she becomes the delivery ship's captain. She is one of the few characters in the cast to routinely display competence and the ability to command, and routinely saves the rest of the cast from disaster, but suffers extreme self-doubt because she has only one eye and grew up as a bullied orphan. She first believes herself an alien but later is revealed to be a mutant. Leela is also a skilled fighter and an environmentalist. The series also follows the relationship between Fry and Leela, as they start off as friends but later develop feelings for one another.

=== Bender Bending Rodríguez ===
Bender Bending Rodríguez (voiced by John DiMaggio), designated in-universe as Bending Unit 22, unit number 1,729, serial number 2716057, is a humanoid industrial robot who rounds out the main trio of characters. He fulfills a comic, antihero-type role in Futurama and is described by fellow character Leela as an "alcoholic, whore-mongering, chain-smoking gambler". Fry meets Bender at a suicide booth (which Fry mistakes for a telephone booth) after exploring the city following his escape from the cryogenics facility he was frozen at. After Fry gives Bender a reason to keep living, the two are caught by Leela, who joins them in going to Planet Express. Bender fulfills a variety of odd jobs at the company, including the head chef, and is also Fry's best friend and roommate.

=== Professor Farnsworth ===
Professor Hubert J. Farnsworth (voiced by Billy West) is Fry's great (×30) nephew and great (×31) grandson because of time reef paradox. A mad scientist and the proprietor of Planet Express, he alternates between intelligence and amoral senility due to his greatly advanced age, stated to be at least 150 years old on multiple occasions (160 years old as of "A Clone of My Own"). He demonstrates a mastery of any field of science necessary for the series' plots and is suggested to be one of the most brilliant inventors on Earth. However, he falls asleep constantly, and he is implied to have routinely sent his former crews on suicide missions. He wears very thick glasses and has a gift for creating doomsday devices and atomic supermen. He has put at least one parallel universe in peril with his inventions and visited dozens more.

The Professor teaches at Mars University and has worked for Momcorp on several occasions but spends most of his time inventing ridiculous devices and sending the Planet Express delivery crew on suicide missions. What he is a professor of is never explicitly stated. In the episode "Mars University", when asked what he is teaching, he responds: "The same thing I teach every semester, the mathematics of quantum neutrino fields. I made up the title so no student would dare take it"; however, this declaration has not precluded the professor from demonstrating mastery of whatever field of science is convenient for a given episode's plot, as shown in Bender's Big Score when he proclaims, "I can wire anything directly into anything! I am the Professor!", proceeding to link Hermes' disembodied head to the ship's computer. Approximately 100 years before the series' timeline, he taught a young (not yet Professor) Wernstrom, whom Farnsworth regarded as a prized student. After he returned a pop quiz to Wernstrom with a grade of A-minus (for poor penmanship), the two became bitter rivals.

Many episodes' major plot points are introduced by Farnsworth announcing, "Good news, everyone!" or some variation thereof, either to unveil his latest invention or describe the company's latest delivery assignment. On the very few occasions he has actual good news, he often opens with "Bad news, everyone!" After Fry resigns from his job in "Law & Oracle", he states that he only says these phrases to make Fry "feel better about his pointless job." Another is his exclamation, "Sweet zombie Jesus!" He often says "Eh Wha?" when unaware of the situation, or when someone questions a statement he has just made. The Professor often makes mutually contradictory statements just moments apart; this happens especially often when briefing his employees, with the prevailing second statement canceling a much more reassuring first sentence.

The Professor rarely worries about the safety of the crew, viewing them as a means to an end, as evidenced in the first episode, where he is indifferent to what happened to his previous crew and only focuses on getting a new one. Farnsworth's employees later discover that their predecessors died while gathering honey from Space Bees. The Professor issues his new crew the previous crew's career chips from a manila envelope labeled "Contents Of Space Wasp's Stomach".

It is established in the episode "Mother's Day" that the Professor was once Mom's lover and employee. However, they could not maintain their relationship due to Mom's lust for power, including when she decided to weaponize his "Q.T. McWhiskers" toy, prompting them to break up. When Mom takes control of all the world's robots to cause an uprising, her sons Walt, Larry, and Igner attempt to get the Professor to seduce Mom and retrieve the remote for the robots. They get back together briefly, but break up once more when Mom learns the Professor had been initially using her. It is revealed in Bender's Game that the Professor is the biological father of Mom's youngest son Igner — the one whom Mom despises the most.

Many references to the pulp science fiction magazine Weird Tales indicate the Professor may be named in honour of its editor Farnsworth Wright. Another possibility is that he is named after the American inventor and television pioneer Philo Farnsworth who appeared in the Futurama episode "All the Presidents' Heads" as an ancestor of the Professor and Philip J. Fry.

Billy West uses a combination of impressions of Burgess Meredith and Frank Morgan. However, in the "Action Delivery Force" segment of "Reincarnation", the Professor is voiced by David Herman.

=== Hermes Conrad ===
Hermes Conrad
- Futurama character
- First appearance: "The Series Has Landed" (1999)
- Created by: Ken Keeler; Matt Groening
- Voiced by: Phil LaMarr

In-universe information
- Species: Human
- Gender: Male
- Occupation: Bureaucrat Grade 35 and accountant of the Planet Express delivery company.
- Spouse: LaBarbara Conrad (wife)
- Children: Dwight Conrad (son)
- Origin: Kingston, Jamaica

Hermes Conrad (voiced by Phil LaMarr) is a workaholic bureaucrat and the accountant at Planet Express. He is from Jamaica and speaks with a heavy accent. He manages the Planet Express delivery business with responsibilities that include paying bills, giving out legal waivers, and notifying next of kin. Hermes is very enthusiastic about the Limbo and was once an Olympic limbo athlete. An accident in the 2980 Olympic Games in which a fan broke his back trying to emulate Hermes left him traumatized, and he could not bring himself to limbo again until decades later when it was needed. The series also alludes to Hermes using cannabis, though he is never seen using it, partially due to prime-time television censorship standards at the time of Futurama's original run.

Hermes frequently admonishes the staff for not working hard enough, and strongly dislikes Zoidberg, often treating him as a "thing" and not a person. Zoidberg is generally oblivious to this, considering Hermes his friend, but upon learning the truth in "The Six Million Dollar Mon", he callously calls out Hermes for his treatment of him. Later episodes show them building an uneasy rapport, with Hermes slowly softening to Zoidberg. He is also known to dislike labor unions, once referring to Labor Day as created by "fat-cat union gangsters", though seconds later he exclaims "Hot damn, a day off!" upon learning that it was that very day, and consulting Glurmo about firing the entire crew and replacing them with Grunka-Lunkas for half the pay. It is a recurring gag that Hermes wants to kill some or all of the members of the Planet Express crew; in "The Farnsworth Parabox", he suggests that Leela shoot the rest of the crew and ponders ejecting the entire crews of both universes into the sun.

Despite his disdain toward most of his coworkers, he is later portrayed as one of the most compassionate characters in the series, and seems to have a soft spot for Bender. In the Season 6 episode "Lethal Inspection," it is revealed that Hermes worked at the robot factory in Tijuana, Mexico where Bender was constructed, as Inspector No. 5, checking robots for defects as they came off the production line. Bender was built without a backup module, but Hermes' compassion for the baby robot led him to override Bender's "defective" assessment and give him a chance at life. He turned in his resignation afterward, and later destroyed all evidence of his employment there to prevent Bender from learning the truth, almost being killed in the process. At the end of the episode, he smiles as he watches his personnel file burn. In the earlier episode "How Hermes Requisitioned His Groove Back", he risks his bureaucratic license to rescue Bender, sorting the entire Master IN pile in under four minutes to recover the disc containing Bender's downloaded brain.

Hermes is married to LaBarbara Conrad, with whom he has a son Dwight. LaBarbara was formerly married to Hermes' former Limbo rival Barbados Slim, and reunited with Barbados twice when Hermes was temporarily decapitated in Bender's Big Score. Hermes is also overweight, caused by over three decades of overeating including LaBarbara's goat curry, which has made his skin too spicy and acidic for consumption by others.

Phil LaMarr stated that he was originally named Dexter, did not have a Jamaican accent, and was more uptight. Series creator Matt Groening walked up to LaMarr after an early table read and said "Hey Phil, can you do a Jamaican accent?" This resulted in making the character more workable and less bland, according to Groening.

=== Dr. Zoidberg ===
John A. Zoidberg (voiced by Billy West), "M." D., commonly known by his surname Zoidberg, is the staff doctor for Planet Express, despite his poor understanding of human physiology and allusions to his questionable credentials. He is a Decapodian, an anthropomorphic crustacean-like species of alien. His character parodies the supposed wealth and automatic respect of modern doctors—for example, his incompetence at human medicine makes him extremely poor despite his profession, and he is implied to be frequently homeless when not at work. The Decapod (named after the actual Decapoda order of ten-footed crustaceans) are an extended parody on Yiddish culture—the bigger joke being that shellfish are not kosher. The writing riffs on the marine theme in a playfully absurd way, with just about any marine Arthropoda or Mollusca being implied to be akin to Zoidberg.

The crew are often disgusted by his foul habits, such as squirting ink or eating from trash cans, though he is mostly oblivious to their true feelings about him, having referred to Hermes Conrad and Bender as friends. Hermes seems to have the most intense dislike of Zoidberg, seeing him as even more expendable than the rest of the crew. However, when Fry reads Hermes' mind in Into the Wild Green Yonder, it is revealed that Hermes sees him as "pathetic but lovable". In "The Six Million Dollar Mon", after Hermes quits Planet Express and trades his own body parts for robot parts, a depressed Zoidberg recovers the discarded parts and sews them together to create a full-fledged ventriloquist dummy of Hermes, which he later uses to transplant Hermes' brain out of his robot body and back into his original body. After Hermes thanks him and admits that they had never been friends, Zoidberg callously calls out Hermes for his treatment of him, leaving Hermes impressed with this confrontation. Zoidberg briefly becomes a hero when he saves Earth from enslavement to his own kind in "A Taste of Freedom". Fry and Professor Farnsworth are usually the only ones to refer to Zoidberg as a friend, and in Bender's Big Score, Zoidberg says of Fry, "He was the only one of you who never struck me!" during the latter's memorial. Zoidberg has ambitions to be a comedian, but he is entirely unsuccessful at this endeavor. In "That's Lobstertainment!", his uncle, the silent hologram star Harold Zoid (a parody of Harold Lloyd), advises him to give up on comedy and finance a film whose script Zoid is writing.

Billy West performs the character with a Yiddish-inflected accent inspired by actors George Jessel and Lou Jacobi.

Zoidberg is named after an Apple II game that series writer David X. Cohen created in high school called Zoid, similar to the game Qix. The game was rejected by Broderbund. One of Cohen's inspirations for the character of Dr. Zoidberg was the fact that Star Trek character Leonard McCoy, the ship's doctor, frequently administered medical treatment to aliens such as Spock, so Cohen wished human characters in Futurama to be in the uneasy situation of being treated by an alien doctor.

=== Amy Wong ===
Amy Kroker (née Wong)
- Futurama character
- First appearance: "The Series Has Landed" (1999)
- Created by: Matt Groening; David X. Cohen
- Voiced by: Lauren Tom

In-universe information
- Species: Human
- Gender: Female
- Occupation: Physicist intern to Professor Hubert J. Farnsworth
- Family: Leo Wong (father); Inez Wong (mother)
- Spouse: Kif Kroker (Fonfon Ru)
- Children: Axl, Mandy, and Newt Kroker (sons and daughter)
- Relatives: Mr and Mrs. Kroker (parents-in-law)
- Origin: Mars

Amy Kroker (née Wong) (voiced by Lauren Tom) works as an intern at Planet Express, supposedly kept around because she shares Professor Farnsworth's blood type and doesn't notice the Professor's tendency to send his crews on suicide missions. Her cocktail party personality and general klutziness get her in and out of trouble. She is the ditzy, spoiled daughter of wealthy agriculturalist-industrialist Han Chinese rancher parents who raise buggalo (a hybrid of "buffalo" and "bug") on their property, the western hemisphere of the planet Mars. A graduate student for most of the series' run, in season six, she earns her PhD in Applied physics from Mars University, earning her the title of Doctor. Amy is also able to fly the Planet Express ship, and will sometimes pilot the ship if Leela is unable to. By the end of the series, she is the "Fonfon Ru" – the rough equivalent of a Common Law wife – of Kif Kroker, and the "true" mother of his offspring; Axl, Mandy and Newt Kroker. Amy's stereotypically Asian meddling parents frequently pressure her to get married and give them grandchildren, which she is not eager to do. They are often shown to be rather unkind to their daughter, including during an incident in which Amy's father repeatedly made fun of her for being fat as a child.

On the show, between her roles as expert technician and occasional theorist, Amy is known for being somewhat shallow, kind, and ditzy. When Doctor Zoidberg had lost his mind due to hormones and was forced to be tied up, she was fooled multiple times into untying him, despite the dangers. As she said herself, "Fool me seven times, shame on you, fool me eight or more times, shame on me." She uses Martian slang, which is simply American slang with altered consonants. Amy tends to wear rather provocative outfits. Her standard outfit is a midriff baring pink sweatshirt, matching sweatpants, and brown boots, with other outfits consisting of anything that reveals her navel. She confesses to Fry that she dresses that way to rebel against her parents; in the movie Into the Wild Green Yonder, she tells her father that she wears the sweatsuit because she knew he always wanted a son. When provoked, Amy can swear in poorly spoken Cantonese, such as "Aiya, da sei nei", which roughly translates to "Oh my God, I'll beat you to death".

According to her, because of her supreme cuteness, Amy had cuteness reduction surgery on her cheek and nose when she was a teenager.

Amy has dated a few men, and she expresses a sexually adventurous attitude. In Bender's Game she portrayed bisexual characteristics. In "Proposition Infinity", she had a robosexual relationship with Bender; she also has a thing for 'bad boys'. She dated Fry for a time in "Put Your Head on My Shoulders", but the relationship was brief as Fry quickly got sick of her. However, during their relationship, he was involved in an accident, which caused her to have his head grafted onto her shoulder to save his life. She still carries a disfiguring scar from the incident. She has been dating Kif Kroker since 3001. Although she is not ready for total commitment, Amy is sure that one day she will be. In "Kif Gets Knocked Up A Notch", she became the "Smizmar" of Kif's children; that is, she inspired the feelings of love that caused Kif to be receptive to procreation. Although Leela is the biological mother because she grabbed Kif's ungloved hand to keep him from being blown out of his spaceship, not knowing that, in his receptive state, this would impregnate him (some of the children even have only one eye like Leela), the Smizmar is considered to be the true mother in Kif's culture. Amy's love for Kif is undeniable, and she has been seen crying when Kif goes on dangerous missions, fearing for his well-being. In the tenth season, she inadvertently outs herself as bisexual.

When creating Amy's character, Matt Groening and David X. Cohen decided that she would be something of a klutz. Groening was interested in exploring the idea of using slapstick comedy and physical humor with a female character since most of this humor was done by male characters in his previous work, The Simpsons.

Amy's personality was initially different. Lauren Tom has stated that she was originally supposed to be "a car mechanic, really tough lesbian sort of character". She was changed to provide a better contrast between her and Leela.

In the season four episode "Kif Gets Knocked Up a Notch", in which Amy's boyfriend Kif becomes pregnant, there was some disagreement among the writers as to whether Amy should be the real mother of his children. It was eventually decided that having Amy be the mother and reject the children would make her too unlikeable.

=== Zapp Brannigan ===
Zapp Brannigan (voiced by Billy West) is a 25-Star general in the military of the Democratic Order Of Planets (D.O.O.P.), although his title varies. Brannigan was first seen in the episode "Love's Labours Lost in Space" as Captain of the starship Nimbus, where he imprisons Fry, Leela and Bender for violating "Brannigan's Law".

Zapp is generally incompetent, egotistical, boorish, vain, cowardly, sexist and short-sighted. He will often mispronounce words, such as champagne ("sham-PAGG-Enn") and guacamole ("GWACK-a-mole"). Soon after first meeting him, Leela has sex with him out of pity. He mentions this encounter repeatedly in later episodes while remaining convinced that Leela lusts after him despite her opposition to the idea. He tends to make catastrophic mistakes (such as destroying D.O.O.P. headquarters), yet, in the public eye, he is seen as an established and reputable leader of the Earth's military. His reputation as a respected hero draws from his numerous military victories, however his victories are shown to be hollow: either beating comically weak opponents or employing tactics that wantonly disregard the safety of his own soldiers.

The character is based on the Star Trek captain James T. Kirk, played by William Shatner. The show's executive producer David X. Cohen has described Brannigan as "half Captain Kirk, half actual William Shatner". Zapp is voiced by Billy West, though he was originally intended to be voiced by Phil Hartman. Hartman insisted on auditioning for the role, and "of course, just nailed it" according to creator Matt Groening. However, after Hartman was murdered on May 28, 1998, West was given the role. On a Futurama DVD commentary, Groening claimed that Zapp's character and mannerisms were established in West's original audition for the character, and any similarity to Phil Hartman or his other well known cartoon characters (Lionel Hutz and Troy McClure) is simply coincidence. On the other hand, in an interview for the website TV Squad, Billy West states that his Zapp Brannigan is an imitation of Hartman and also "modeled after a couple of big dumb announcers I knew." During a live event, West stated that he partially modelled Brannigan's cadence after the radio persona of Doug Tracht, also known as "The Greaseman".

=== Kif Kroker ===
Lieutenant Kif Kroker (voiced by Maurice LaMarche) is the long-suffering assistant to Captain Zapp Brannigan, consort of Amy, and Fourth Lieutenant on the Democratic Order of Planets (DOOP) starship Nimbus. Kif is a short, thin, green-skinned amphibious alien from the planet Amphibios 9, and he compares his body plan to a sea cucumber. His frustration with Brannigan's arrogance, general incompetence, and lack of personal boundaries in Season 1 leads him to be a disaffected, indifferent, sardonic lackey, although his personality develops through the course of the series, becoming more emotional, tender and sweet-natured later on. Zapp thinks Kif to be his best friend and loyal confidant, whereas Kif sees Brannigan as an incompetent and vain buffoon, going so far as to call him a jackass in "Love's Labours Lost in Space". Despite this, Kif seemingly has some loyalty to Brannigan, even continuing to associate with him after Brannigan caused him to be court-martialed. Kif is in a long relationship with Amy Wong.

=== Nibbler ===
Lord Nibbler (vocal effects and speaking voice provided by Frank Welker) masquerades as an innocent, cute and unintelligent pet during most of the series. In reality, he is a highly intelligent Nibblonian and capable of communication, but tries to avoid suspicion while he protects the Earth in general and Fry in particular from the Brainspawn. As with all Nibblonians, Nibbler's feces consist of dark matter, which can be used as starship fuel. It is an extremely dense material, "each pound of which weighs over ten thousand pounds", according to Professor Farnsworth. After he accidentally reveals to the Planet Express crew that he can speak in Bender's Big Score, he forgets to wipe their memory of his intelligence, which it turns out does not affect them much, and from then on he speaks freely to the crew. In the pilot episode, Nibbler's shadow can be seen as Fry falls into the cryogenic freezer, alluding to the reveal in the fourth season episode "The Why of Fry" that he helped send Fry to the future.

According to series creator Matt Groening, Nibbler was inspired by troll dolls; "they had pug noses and were kind of cute-ugly."

=== Scruffy ===
Scruffy (voiced by David Herman) is the Planet Express gruff janitor. He tells Hermes he is responsible for "Toilets and boilers, boilers and toilets, plus that one boiling toilet. Fire me if'n you dare." A character looking very much like Scruffy first appeared in "A Fishful of Dollars" as a masseur for Bender, but he was later added to the cast as an infrequently-seen staffperson at Planet Express with the second-season episode "Anthology of Interest I". Scruffy generally approaches both his job and the rest of his life with a high level of apparent apathy, as shown in "Parasites Lost", in which he ignores a broken boiler in the Planet Express headquarters to read a pornographic magazine, and continues to read even after the boiler explodes, declaring, "Scruffy's gonna die the way he lived." In "Future Stock", it is revealed that he is deeply fond of the company, and owns four times as much stock as the other employees. The first several times he is referred to or seen by his co-workers, they ask who he is, to which he replies, "I'm Scruffy. The janitor." A running gag in Scruffy's early appearances is that no one remembers having met Scruffy before, nor does he remember them, even after they have been seen interacting in multiple previous episodes. This gag is eventually dropped. He is shown several times to read porn magazines like National Pornographic and Zero G Juggs (parodies of actual magazines, National Geographic and Juggs).

The Season 6 episode "The Prisoner of Benda" reveals that he is in love with his robotic wash bucket, but avoids entering into a relationship with it. He is murdered by Robot Santa in the non-canonical anthology episode "The Futurama Holiday Spectacular".

In "Law & Oracle", it is revealed that Scruffy died at some point and was brought back to life as a zombie, remarking that "Life and death are a seamless continuum." Scruffy was seen in the 2014 The Simpsons crossover episode "Simpsorama" with the rest of the Planet Express staff, in which his zombie status is referenced.

=== Mom ===
Carol "Mom" Miller (voiced by Tress MacNeille) is the series' main antagonist. She is an aggressive, threatening and Machiavellian harridan, who manages and owns 99.7% of MomCorp, a large, multibillion-dollar industrial complex with numerous subsidiaries and a monopoly on robot production, as well as being the company that created Bender. Publicly, she retains the corporate image of a sweet, bustling old woman who often slips into the stereotype of a Deep South grandmother; behind the scenes, she removes her fat suit and emerges as a skeleton-thin, malevolent, greedy, and foul-mouthed old crone. She has three sons, Walt, Larry and Igner, whom she verbally and physically abuses and often employs to do her dirty work. Mom has a romantic history with Hubert J. Farnsworth, who worked at MomCorp when he was younger, and she was previously married to Dr. Ogden Wernstrom. In Bender's Game, it was revealed that Farnsworth is Igner's father.

Her given name is revealed to be Carol in "The Tip of the Zoidberg".

In the episode "Leela and the Genestalk", Mom works out of "Momsanto", a floating castle that hosts a genetic engineering facility. Its name is a reference to Monsanto, an American agricultural company known for genetic engineering of plants.

== Secondary characters ==
=== Calculon ===
Calculon (voiced by Maurice LaMarche) is a gold-colored robot actor renowned for his melodramatic roles and dramatic speaking style. His most famous role is as the lead character in the long-running robot soap opera All My Circuits. It is claimed in "The Devil's Hands Are Idle Playthings" that Calculon received his acting ability from the Robot Devil. Calculon is from the 21st century, having been created as a standard industrial robot called Calculon 1.0. He changes his name and appearance every few decades to conceal his true age, claiming that one of his disguises was David Duchovny. It is revealed in "Bender Should Not Be Allowed on TV" that throughout his entire time on All My Circuits, he has only ever done one take for each scene; in "Calculon 2.0" Calculon professes to not know the meaning of a "second take".

In the episode "The Honking", it is revealed that his first job was in 2019 as a motorised service arm building the most evil car in existence, Project Satan. Calculon was run over by Project Satan, and became a were-car (the robot equivalent of a werewolf). The curse is broken at the end of the episode, when Project Satan is destroyed.

In "Bend Her", Calculon begins a relationship with Bender while he is disguised as Coilette of Robonia; Bender undergoes temporary gender reassignment to participate in the fembot league of the 3004 Earth Olympics. He becomes smitten with Bender's alter ego, who is merely using him for material gain. Calculon proposes, and Coilette accepts and then decides that she cannot continue the deception, and subsequently fakes her death at their wedding. In the conclusion of the episode, Coilette undergoes surgery to become Bender again, and Calculon makes a film in tribute to Coilette.

In The Beast With A Billion Backs Calculon is seen as the leader of the League of Robots, a robot supremacy society. Bender cheats in a duel with Calculon, resulting in the loss of one of Calculon's arms and the destruction of the league's headquarters. Calculon subsequently becomes outraged at Bender and resigns from the league, relinquishing the presidency to Bender. In Into The Wild Green Yonder, it is said that his operating system is Windows Vista. In re-airings of the movie on Comedy Central, he says his operating system is Windows 7.

Calculon dies in "The Thief of Baghead" when he tries to defeat Langdon Cobb in the World Acting Championship after Leela and Bender advise him to do the Romeo and Juliet scene and give him water and food coloring. Unfortunately, food coloring is fatal to robots. Calculon decides the only way to win the award is to actually drink the food coloring and die. After he dies, Cobb wins the award instead of him, making his death pointless.

In "Calculon 2.0", Bender and Fry decide to revive Calculon after deciding that they do not care for his replacement on All My Circuits, Vaxtron. They journey to Robot Hell and obtain Calculon's soul from the Robot Devil. The Professor has the crew perform a series of ritualistic "scientific" tasks to put the soul of Calculon back in his body. After Calculon is brought back to life, he returns to acting. He first performs a one-man show. When the show receives poor reviews where it was claimed that some people were taken to the hospital as well as a news report stating that Calculon's star on the Hollywood Walk of Fame was replaced with another one for Robert Wagner, Calculon determines that maybe he should not be acting and should have remained in hell. Leela, who opposed Calculon's return to acting, now wants to help him return to All My Circuits. She explains that he should go to an audition in disguise to play Calculon for the show. When he lands the part, Calculon returns to his former ways. Leela then makes him feel bad by saying that he has no acting skills, and that the world had forgotten he had even been alive within the first month of his death. She then explains to Bender and Fry that it was a ploy to save his part in the show. The show crew is smitten by his down-to-earth acting skills, and he reveals himself as Calculon. As he takes a bow, once again thinking that his life is worth living, a massive lighting fixture falls, crushing him. His life as Calculon 2.0 is honored; he watches the ceremony in Robot Hell where his soul resides once more much to the annoyance of the Robot Devil.

Calculon is brought back from Robot Hell in the first episode of the Hulu-produced revival season, "The Impossible Stream." In an attempt to watch every episode of television ever produced, Fry enters a binge-state that overpowers his mind while watching the final season of All My Circuits. To save Fry from mental whiplash from returning to reality, Leela and Bender pitch a revival of All My Circuits to the robot executives at streamer Fulu, who make a deal with the Robot Devil to bring Calculon back from the dead.

=== Morbo ===
Morbo the Annihilator (voiced by Maurice LaMarche) is the misanthropic alien anchor for √2 News, Entertainment and Earth Invasion Tonight, Good Morning Earth, and other shows on the √2 Television Network. Morbo is an advance scout for an upcoming alien invasion and does not bother to be subtle about it, often expressing his contempt and extreme hatred for mankind during live news broadcasts and commenting frequently on his species' extremely violent invasion plans. He appears to be using his job to gather information about the human race to aid the planned invasion. Morbo is good friends with President Richard Nixon. His co-host Linda van Schoonhoven seems blissfully dismissive of Morbo's hatred and usually responds with an empty-headed laugh to Morbo's contemptuous outbursts. He is married to Mrs. (Fawn) Morbo, a member of his species.

=== Linda van Schoonhoven ===
Linda van Schoonhoven (voiced by Tress MacNeille) is the co-anchor of √2 News with Morbo. She is blissfully unaware of or indifferent to his hatred for humanity, often giggling absentmindedly when he calls for the death of humans. Linda joins Leela and her feministas in Into the Wild Green Yonder due to Morbo being treated better than her by the producers with higher pay and more air time. In "Benderama", it is revealed that she is a severe alcoholic, which may explain her cheerful and seemingly oblivious demeanor. It is also revealed that a contributing cause to her alcoholism is her relationship with her children.

In the 2014 The Simpsons crossover episode "Simpsorama", she is eaten alive by one of the rabbit-shaped creatures that breaks into the studio.

== Planet Express crew relatives ==
=== Axl, Mandy and Newt ===
Axl (voiced by Maurice LaMarche), Newt and Mandy (both voiced by Lauren Tom) are the children of Kif Kroker and Amy Wong. Although Amy raises them as her own, their genetic mother is Leela. Kif gives birth to them in "Kif Gets Knocked Up a Notch", and twenty years later, in "Children of a Lesser Bog", they are the only remaining spawn that survive the perils of nature, getting eaten by creatures or Zoidberg. Despite being the same age, Axl appears to resemble a teenager, Mandy a child and Newt a baby due to spending their development in the swamp at different water levels. Newt has only one eye and Axl has black hair. Their names are plays on types of amphibians: axolotl, salamander, and newt, respectively.

=== Cubert Farnsworth ===
Cubert Farnsworth (voiced by Kath Soucie) is Professor Farnsworth's clone, which the Professor produced to serve as his heir and continue his scientific legacy. He is introduced in the episode "A Clone of My Own", in which he rejects Farnsworth and becomes hostile to the entire Planet Express crew. Professor Farnsworth reveals that he had been lying about his age, and is taken to the Near Death Star for retirement. The crew rescues the professor using Cubert's (and thus the Professor's) DNA to gain entry, and Cubert (after taking a hard hit to his head) announces that he will continue the professor's science after all.

The Professor created Cubert with the intention that he would continue his work after discovering that his life was wasted with nothing but failed or worthless inventions. Hubert is delighted until he discovers that Cubert's intentions are not as he planned. Cubert wants to do something 'better' with his life and does not accept the responsibility Hubert gives to him. He believes that most things happen to be "Impossible" contrary to the Professor's belief that nothing is impossible. Cubert has an epiphany after getting hit on the head, realizing how the starship engines Hubert invented work, allowing them to be repaired while Hubert is incapacitated. After this, he decides he wants to follow in his "father's" footsteps after all. Cubert became friends with Dwight Conrad, the son of Planet Express's resident bureaucrat Hermes Conrad.

=== Dwight Conrad ===
Dwight Conrad (voiced by Bumper Robinson in two episodes, Phil LaMarr in the rest of the series) is the son of Hermes Conrad and LaBarbara Conrad. He is a close friend and Dungeons & Dragons player with Cubert Farnsworth, and follows his father in the ways of accounting and bureaucracy.

=== LaBarbara Conrad ===
LaBarbara Conrad (voiced by Dawnn Lewis) is the statuesque and much more attractive wife of Hermes Conrad and mother of Dwight Conrad. Her number two is her ex-husband Barbados Slim, the rival of Hermes, who she refers to as "a human Adonis" and "a mahogany god." Hermes is insecure when Barbados is around, and LaBarbara leaves Hermes occasionally, such as in Bender's Big Score, to be with Barbados Slim after Hermes loses his body. She often wears clothes that reveal her belly button (like Amy Wong), and she scolds Hermes for his off-screen cannabis use.

=== Leo and Inez Wong ===
Leo Wong (voiced by Billy West in Seasons 1-7, Feodor Chin in Season 8-present) and Inez Wong (voiced by Lauren Tom) are the very wealthy parents of Amy Wong. They are human Martians of Chinese descent who own the entire western hemisphere of Mars and a buggalo ranch. They often pester Amy about their lack of grandchildren and meddle in her love life, trying to find a man to father their grandchild. When Amy and Kif Kroker begin dating, they decide Kif is not man enough for her. They do seem happy when he and Amy have children. Leo is one of the primary villains in Into the Wild Green Yonder, and they disrespect the indigenous Martians.

=== Morris and Munda ===
Turanga Morris and Turanga Munda (voiced by David Herman and Tress MacNeille) are Leela's father and mother and later on Fry's parents-in-law. They are sewer mutants who love Leela deeply and try to give her as normal a life as possible by passing her off as an alien and leaving her to be raised in an orphanage. They participate in her life as much as possible from the sewers until Leela finally learns the truth and attempts to form a real relationship. They each have one eye, Morris has a vertically oriented mouth, ten toes on each foot, and the ability to shed his skin, while Munda has a lion-like tail and octopus tentacles in place of arms.

Their original appearance in "I Second That Emotion" shows them as plain cyclopes like Leela.

The plot of "Leela's Homeworld" required the addition of extra mutations to fit with the idea that Leela is able to live a normal life, while they cannot. In the same episode it is also revealed that Munda has a PhD in "exo-linguistics", which allows her to speak alien languages and write in "Alienese".

=== Yancy Fry and Mrs. Fry ===
Yancy Fry (voiced by John DiMaggio) and Mrs. Fry (voiced by Tress MacNeille) are Fry's father and mother and later on Leela's parents-in-law. They are humans in the 20th century who tended to be absorbed in their own interests. Fry's ex-girlfriend Michelle later informs Fry that the police wanted to look for him, but his parents felt it was a waste of taxpayers' money. However, it is revealed over the course of the series that they did indeed miss Fry and searched for him to no avail. "Yancy" is a traditional family given name going back to the Revolutionary War, so it is unknown if Yancy is properly referred to as "Yancy Sr.". ("Luck of the Fryrish")

As a result of Philip's time travel, Yancy Sr. is the result of an incestuous one-night stand between Philip and his grandmother, therefore the son of his own son. ("Roswell That Ends Well")

=== Yancy Fry Jr. ===
Yancy Fry Jr. (voiced by Tom Kenny) is Fry's older brother in the 20th and 21st centuries. Yancy Jr. is mostly rude and competitive with Philip as seen in "The Luck of the Fryrish." His jealousy of his brother dates back to Philip's birth, when Yancy wanted to have that name, but is informed that his name, Yancy, is a family tradition dating to the Revolutionary War. (It is unknown if he is formally named Yancy Jr.) After Fry disappears, Yancy becomes so devastated that he eventually names his son Philip J. Fry in his honor. Yancy is also an ancestor of Professor Farnsworth.

== Antagonists ==
=== Walt, Larry, and Igner ===
Walt (voiced by Maurice LaMarche), Larry (voiced by David Herman) and Igner (voiced by John DiMaggio) are Mom's three sons, who are often on the receiving end of her verbal and physical abuse. Walt is the oldest and the leader with a voice based on Vincent Price; Larry, true to his name, is the middle stooge of the trio with a spineless personality; and Igner, the youngest, dumbest and most easily distracted, is the aptly named ignoramus. It is revealed in Bender's Game that Professor Farnsworth is Igner's father, and other scenes imply that Professor Wernstrom fathered the other two as well.

=== Omicronians ===
The Omicronians are a reptilian alien race from the planet Omicron Persei 8.

- Lrrr (/lɜːr/, voiced by Maurice LaMarche) is the ruler of the planet Omicron Persei 8, and always introduces himself as such. He aims to project a strong ruthless demeanor of a conqueror but often ends up showing a sensitive side. He is currently married to Ndnd, his second wife, with whom he has one son, Jrrr (/dʒɜːr/, voiced by Lauren Tom). His first major appearance is in the episode "When Aliens Attack". In "Lrrreconcilable Ndndifferences", he claims to have murdered his father for his cape.
- Ndnd (voiced by Tress MacNeille, pronounced /ʌndˈʌndʌ/), is Lrrr's second wife. She is overbearing and bossy, often nagging Lrrr to eat more healthily and fulfill his duties as supreme ruler of Omicron Persei 8. In "Lrrreconcilable Ndndifferences" she seems entirely unconcerned by Lrrr's infidelity with another Omicronian woman but is deeply upset by him listening to Leela's nagging over her own. Their marital problems also feature heavily in "Spanish Fry".

=== Robot Mafia ===
The Robot Mafia is a small crime syndicate operating out of "Fronty's Meat Market" and "Small Bill's Laundry", who periodically dine at Elzar's, hijack shipments of Zuban cigars, arrange "accidents" for robots who act against them, as well as other unspecified Mafia-related illegal activities. They are made up of:

- The Donbot (voiced by Maurice LaMarche) – The crime boss of the Robot Mafia. He is often depicted to be oblivious to various plots against him, particularly repeated infractions by Bender, including having sex with the Donbot's wife, having sex with his daughter, stealing from the Donbot, and stealing the Donbot's own foot. Despite his obliviousness, he still sees to it that his orders are carried out and have any of his enemies eliminated.
- Clamps (voiced by Maurice LaMarche) – A goonbot with an angry, aggressive disposition obsessed with using the clamps that act as his hands. At times, the Donbot and/or Joey would have to restrain Clamps from losing his temper. In the Season 6 episode "The Silence of the Clamps", his name is revealed to be Francis X. Clampazzo.
- Joey Mousepad (voiced by John DiMaggio) – A burly goonbot wearing a computer-mouse necklace. He is somewhat dim-witted, as noted by his occasional malapropisms. In one instance, Joey offered to dub Bender (who later chose "Blotto") with the nickname "Clamps," which infuriated Clamps.
- Fanny (voiced by Tress MacNeille) is a female robot and Donbot's wife with a propeller built into her rear end. She has an affair with Bender during Into the Wild Green Yonder, leading the Donbot to have both of them shot and buried as a warning. They survive and Fanny returns to her husband. The couple have at least two daughters, including Bella, with whom Bender has a brief relationship during "The Silence of the Clamps". Her body contains a church bell that rings loudly whenever she moves.

=== Dr. Ogden Wernstrom ===
Dr. Ogden Wernstrom (voiced by David Herman) is a former student and now rival of Professor Farnsworth, in the field of science. He resents an "A−" grade given for sloppy penmanship by Farnsworth in 2900, and worked for over one hundred years to obtain revenge. Farnsworth usually greets him with an angry shaking fist and a long, drawn-out "Weeeerrnnn-strom!" He often competes against Farnsworth in various competitions, such as the Annual Inventors' Symposium. Despite this, their rivalry appears to have softened over the years, and they have even managed to collaborate with one another every once in a while. Wernstrom also appears to respect some of Farnsworth's decisions if he himself believes them to be right as well, as showed in The Beast with a Billion Backs.

In Bender's Game it is revealed that he was once previously married to Mom, and may be the father of Mom's two eldest sons Walt and Larry.

The Season 6 episode "Cold Warriors" reveals that Wernstrom has been appointed Surgeon General of Earth.

=== Richard Nixon ===
The former president (voiced by Billy West) is kept alive as a head in a jar like many other celebrities. He originally resides in the Hall of Presidents in the Head Museum, but he eventually leaves and becomes the President of Earth, winning by a single vote. Nixon's administration is marked by a violent and aggressive foreign policy, frequently entering into wars which serve little or no purpose. Nixon's head is sometimes accompanied by Spiro Agnew's headless body.

Billy West has commented that he is not impersonating Richard Nixon for the role; he is impersonating Anthony Hopkins in Nixon (with "a little bit of werewolf", his Nixon has a tendency to inject a sound similar to "aroo" into his sentences), and that he, instead of trying to cultivate a good impersonation, cultivates the flaws in his impersonation. Matt Groening also frequently expresses his pleasure that he can continue to poke fun at Nixon 30 or 40 years after he was in office. Nixon's head was included in TV Squad's list of the five best television appearances by presidents in animated or puppet form. The character was considered to be particularly interesting because he could be "pure evil" but also command respect and also because "Nixon's head trapped in glass is just really funny."

=== Roberto ===
Roberto (voiced by David Herman) is a criminally insane, psychotic robot who often carries a knife with which he is prone to stabbing. His voice is based on that of comedian Dick Shawn. He is often depicted as a patient receiving treatment for criminal insanity. In his first appearance in "Insane in the Mainframe", he is committed to an insane asylum after he targets the same bank for robbery three times in a row, and is seen killing other robots when escaping that hospital. In Bender's Game he states that his creators were trying to make an insane robot, but "failed". This violent nature is enhanced by a body that David X. Cohen and Matt Groening say is based on the shape of a tombstone. Roberto appears in Bender's Game as a patient in the same asylum. He later appears in the Middle-earth spoof scenes of that film as a role equivalent to that of Denethor. He briefly becomes sane after he is hit on the head during a battle, but reverts to insanity after he is immediately hit a second time. He appears in "Proposition Infinity" in the same asylum, this time with a sock instead of his usual knife. He says to Bender, "You ever kill a man with a sock? It ain't so hard."

In the season 7 episode "The Six Million Dollar Mon", Roberto is arrested when he tries to rob Hermes Conrad and his wife LaBarbara of their skin. He is executed for this crime, but Bender later digs him up and steals his brain circuitry so that Hermes can have it installed in his own head to complete his transformation into a robot. When the robot tries to steal the skin from the real Hermes (reassembled by Doctor Zoidberg from the discarded body parts), it melts down due to the accumulated residue of heavy spices from LaBarbara's cooking.

Roberto appears alive in "Stench and Stenchibility" and "How the West Was 1010001".

=== Robot Devil ===
Beelzebot, more commonly referred to as The Robot Devil (voiced by Dan Castellaneta in regular appearances, Maurice LaMarche in "A Tale of Two Santas"), serves as the leader of Robot Hell, which is hidden beneath the "Inferno" ride at the amusement park "Reckless Ted's Funland" in New Jersey. His function is to torment robots who have committed various sins under the practice of Robotology. If a deal is made with the Robot Devil, he appears to have unlimited power and can grant almost any request, but always with a catch that would benefit him and cause the other party to suffer. The voice acting of the Robot Devil by Dan Castellaneta has been described as a "bravura performance" on his part. The Robot Devil is available as a build-a-figure from the first three series of Futurama action figures by Toynami.

He first appears in "Hell Is Other Robots", kidnapping Bender and tormenting him until Fry and Leela manage to save Bender. He plays another major role in "The Devil's Hands Are Idle Playthings", in which Fry makes a deal with the Devil to improve his holophonor skills. Fry wins the Robot Devil's own hands and uses them to write an opera about his and Leela's life all the way up until he makes his deal with the Robot Devil. The Robot Devil manages to reverse the trade after setting up a complicated scheme to force Fry into relinquishing his hands as a condition for Leela not to marry him under contractual obligation. The character also makes brief cameos in "A Tale of Two Santas" and "Crimes of the Hot". In the episode "The Silence of the Clamps" he is shown as one of the wedding guests. He plays a key role in the Season 6 episode "Ghost in the Machines", offering to reunite Bender's body and spirit if Bender scares Fry to death. This same episode reveals that he keeps several spare bodies in his office and can transfer his spirit to one of these if his body is destroyed.

The Robot Devil appears in the film series on several occasions, most notably The Beast with a Billion Backs, where Bender makes a deal with the Robot Devil exchanging his first-born son for the Armies of Hell. Bender more than happily locates his son and kicks the child into a vat of lava, causing the Robot Devil to comment, "That was pretty brutal, even by my standards." Bender simply replies, "No backsies!" In Bender's Big Score, he conducts the band at Lars and Leela's wedding.

In the commentary for "The Devil's Hands Are Idle Playthings", Castellaneta says the voice is based on a "bad impression of Hans Conried".

=== Robot Santa ===
Robot Santa (voiced by John Goodman in the first appearance, John DiMaggio in later appearances) is a robot created in 2801 by The Friendly Robot Company to judge beings as naughty or nice and distribute presents or punishments accordingly. Due to a programming error, his standards are too high, and he judges everyone to be equally naughty – with the one-time exception of Dr. Zoidberg, who got a Pogo-Stick as a present. In the event that he judges himself naughty, Robot Santa can regenerate his head when it explodes. This leads him to go on destructive rampages across Earth every Christmas using Christmas-themed weapons, such as grenades shaped like Christmas ornaments, bicycle guns, and T.O.W. missile launchers to punish "naughty" beings. He resides in a death fortress on Neptune along with a number of Neptunians that act as slave labor for the toy factory.

On land his feared presence can be heard with the loud clacking of his metal boots, and in the sky, he is feared by his sleigh bells on his robot Reindeers. This causes Earth's locals to panic and take shelter in their own homes or in retail stores.

In Bender's Big Score, he assisted Earth's population in reclaiming their planet after it was purchased by the devious Scammers, forcing his Neptunian elves to build weapons for an assault and participating personally in the ensuing battle. He is part of an alliance called The Trinity, a trio of holiday-themed madmen comprising himself, Kwanzaabot, and the Chanukah Zombie.

In "I Know What You Did Next Xmas", Professor Farnsworth goes back in time to attempt to fix Santa's naughty and nice sensor. When he believes he did so, he has everyone celebrate Xmas with their families, however, Bender and Zoidberg have no families to go home to, so they go back in time to murder Robot Santa. They do their best to hide the body all around, but by the end, they see that Santa is still alive and still thinks everyone is naughty, because the Professor created a paradox in which he was the one who made Santa think everyone on Earth was naughty.

=== Barbados Slim ===
Barbados Slim (voiced by John DiMaggio in seasons 4-7, Kevin Michael Richardson in season 8-present) is Hermes' arch-rival. He not only defeated Hermes at the 3004 Olympics to win the gold medal in limbo, but is also the only person ever to win gold medals in both limbo and sex. He was formerly married to LaBarbara Conrad, who still refers to him as a "mahogany god".

In Futurama: Bender's Big Score after Hermes was decapitated in a limboing accident, LaBarbara left him and got back together with Barbados, even going so far as to take his last name, even though they never remarried and Dwight was never adopted. After Hermes uses his bureaucratic prowess to save Earth from the scammers and wins back LaBarbara (and gets a new body), Slim vows "You have not seen the last of Barbados Slim!" before adding "Now goodbye forever!" As he prepares to leave the bridge, the sliding door malfunctions and goes down halfway. Slim then tries to limbo beneath only for the door to fall and crush his chest.

== Other recurring characters ==
=== Abner Doubledeal ===
Doubledeal (voiced by Tom Kenny) is a businessman usually depicted organizing or owning various sporting events, to which he would recruit various season regulars. He first appeared in "Raging Bender" as the owner of the Ultimate Robot Fighting League, and later in "A Leela of Her Own" as owner of the New New York Mets blernsball team.

He was a television producer in "Yo Leela Leela", at the end of which he adopted all of the orphans from Cookieville Minimum-Security Orphanarium to help him produce Leela's show Rumbledy-hump.

By the time of the events of "The Butterjunk Effect" episode Doubledeal was in charge of the Butterfly Derby. The character's name is a reference to Abner Doubleday, a US Civil War general who was alleged to have invented the game of baseball.

=== Amazonians ===
The Amazonians are tall, mighty women who first appear in "Brannigan, Begin Again" but first feature in "Amazon Women in the Mood" when Fry, Bender, Zapp, Leela, Amy and Kif are stranded on their planet. They are primitives who wield clubs, live in huts and happened to be ruled by a female computer called "Femputer" (voiced by Bea Arthur). The Femputer is revealed to be a fembot operating the giant computer facade from a small control room. Their legal system permits a capital punishment ritual called "Death by Snu-Snu."

Most Amazonians are voiced by Tress MacNeille. Other Amazonians have been voiced by Suzie Plakson and Karen Maruyama.

=== Celebrity heads ===
Various celebrities and historical figures are kept alive as heads in jars of liquids. The technology is crucial to Futurama's connection with 20th- and 21st-century culture since it allows significant figures from the past to make appearances in the series. This also allows for contemporary celebrities to make guest appearances as themselves. The technology was invented by Ron Popeil, himself a head. People seem to be able to be resurrected using this technology, as every U.S. president is found in the "Head Museum"; the most prominent head is that of Richard Nixon who becomes the President of Earth. In "All the Presidents' Heads", it is revealed the water they are kept in when drunk can send a person back to the year when they were the most famous.

While most of the heads are voiced by their real life counterparts, some of them are voiced by impersonators.

=== The Hyper-Chicken Lawyer ===
The Hyper-Chicken Lawyer (voiced by Maurice LaMarche) is a large blue/green chicken with southern mannerisms and a pince-nez perched on his beak. He is an alien originally from what he describes as a "backwoods asteroid." The show never reveals the Hyper-Chicken Lawyer's name (or the non-existence thereof); in "Brannigan Begin Again", it is revealed that the Hyper-Chicken Lawyer's species is "hyper-chicken". In the commentary of "A Tale of Two Santas", David X. Cohen explains that the script simply used the designation "hyper-chicken" to refer to the character. He is a lawyer who has appeared both as a defense attorney and as a prosecutor. He is a terrible lawyer but despite his incompetence he sometimes manages to win his cases, and if he doesn't he usually tells his clients to plead insanity.

The Hyper-Chicken Lawyer is a parodic cross between "folksy" country lawyers such as Ben Matlock and Atticus Finch with Looney Tunes character Foghorn Leghorn.

In a deleted scene from Into the Wild Green Yonder, he is named Matcluck.

=== Elzar ===
Elzar (voiced by John DiMaggio) is a famous four-armed Neptunian chef with his own New New York restaurant, "Elzar's Fine Cuisine", and television show. Elzar is rude, crass, and unpleasant, and has a very high opinion of himself. He never passes up an opportunity to milk money from his customers and fans. He has also been known to steal from his own cash register on occasion. Elzar's favorite cooking implement is his Spice Weasel, a mustelid-like creature which propels a cloud of spices from its snout upon having its body squeezed. Elzar often uses the phrases "Bam!", "knock it up a notch", and "no question". The character of Elzar is an allusion to Emeril Lagasse.

=== The Globetrotters ===
The Globetrotters are a race of basketball playing humans who reside on Globetrotter Planet. Aside from showboating basketball shenanigans, the Globetrotters are all known for their math, logic, and physics prowess and have aided in saving both Earth and the Universe.

The Globetrotters are commanded by Ethan 'Bubblegum' Tate. Other known core members include 'Sweet' Clyde Dixon, 'Curly' Joe, and 'Goosh', although there are several other unidentified members of the team seen throughout the series.

==== Ethan 'Bubblegum' Tate ====
Ethan 'Bubblegum' Tate (voiced by Phil LaMarr) is a renowned physicist and the leader of the Globetrotters, who once randomly challenged Earth to defend its honor by playing a game of basketball for no reason (which was a parody of the film Space Jam, and also a reference to the Harlem Globetrotters cartoon series). Tate is one of "the finest scientific minds in the universe", according to Professor Farnsworth. He is also a senior lecturer in physics at Globetrotter University. He has appeared in many episodes with the rest of the team, but also made a solo appearance in several episodes.

==== 'Sweet' Clyde Dixon ====
'Sweet' Clyde Dixon (voiced by David Herman) is a core member of the Globetrotters, who excels at calculus and is another one of the "finest scientific minds in the universe". In "The Prisoner of Benda", he becomes a Duke.

=== Hattie McDoogal ===
Hattie McDoogal (voiced by Tress MacNeille) is an old cat lady and often uses nonsense stand-in words and phrases, such as "kajigger" and "whatchacallit". She briefly serves as the landlady of Fry and Bender, and holds a single share of Planet Express, allowing her the decisive vote for its CEO. She has been married twice, surviving both of them, and often dates. She once hired Kif Kroker as a male escort. MacNeille also voices the Crazy Cat Lady on The Simpsons.

=== Hedonismbot ===
Hedonismbot (voiced by Maurice LaMarche) is a golden robot built in a lounging position that displays the typical characteristics of hedonism and decadence, such as constantly eating from a bowl of grapes on his stomach. He was first seen in "Crimes of the Hot" at the Galapagos Island Robot Party. He has a human servant named Djambi and he has stated that "I too have known unconventional love" with references to doomsday devices. He enjoys having a bath of chocolate, having his nipples rubbed with industrial sandpaper (and a power sander), and seeing how long he can remain entertained during an opera.

=== Hypnotoad ===
The Hypnotoad is a large toad-like alien with pulsating, multicolored eyes, which emits a loud, ominous buzzing noise. It has the power to hypnotize almost any living thing at will, even mass numbers of creatures. The Hypnotoad first appeared in "The Day the Earth Stood Stupid", in which it hypnotized a flock of sheep to herd themselves into a pen and close the door behind them, the panel of judges to win the pet show, and then the audience of the pet show to force their approval of that victory. In "Bender Should Not Be Allowed on TV", it was shown to have a television show, Everybody Loves Hypnotoad, in which it hypnotizes the audience (except for Fry, due to his lack of a delta brain wave). The Futurama: Bender's Big Score DVD includes a full 22-minute episode.

=== Martians ===
The alien natives of Mars are a direct and open parody of modern Native Americans in the United States, including their dress, manners, and accents. Dispossessed of their ancestral lands, which they worshiped as sacred, they take menial jobs as ranch hands and casino employees. Their ancestors traded Mars to the Wong family for one bead, but when they find out that the "bead" is actually a huge diamond, they leave Mars for another planet, which they intend to worship as sacred.

Their chief is Singing Wind (voiced by Billy West).

=== Mayor C. Randall Poopenmeyer ===
Mayor C. Randall Poopenmeyer (voiced by David Herman) is the mayor of New New York. He is often depicted as a corrupt and incompetent politician. He first appeared in the season 1 episode "A Big Piece of Garbage". Throughout the later seasons, he is seen having a rather open affair with the Queen of Yonkers.

=== Officer Smitty ===
Officer Smith, better known as Smitty (voiced by Billy West) is a police officer partnered with URL in New New York. He is sometimes seen with a lightsaber-like nightstick. The two often use excessive force in non-violent circumstances.

In "Bender Gets Made", he claimed that he became a cop because his father owned a restaurant, and frequent dine-and-dashers kept it from going regional. Smitty retires in "Law and Oracle" but returns a few episodes later in "Cold Warriors". In "A Tale of Two Santas", Smitty indicated that he was committing police impersonation after being fired from the New New York Police Department, saying that capturing Robot Santa (in fact, Bender who had taken on the role) would lead to a "juicy rehiring back onto the force [for him]".

=== Officer URL ===
Officer URL (pronounced Earl) (voiced by John DiMaggio in seasons 1-7, Kevin Michael Richardson in seasons 8-present) is a robot police officer paired with Smitty. The two often use excessive force in peaceful situations, and make use of various features built into URL, such as a siren, megaphone and violations printer. He also appears in the parody of Cops called Cop Department. His catchphrase is "Aww, yeah" and other occasional phrases that were previously heard in the 1970s blaxploitation films. In "Law and Oracle", URL becomes Fry's partner after he joins the police force.

=== Petunia ===
Petunia (voiced by Tress MacNeille) is an elderly woman who wears a revealing pink dress and uses a lot of make-up. She is a chain-smoker and a gambler. In the episode "Put Your Head on My Shoulders", Bender sets her up on a Valentine's Day date with Fry after setting up a dating agency. She rejects Fry after learning he does not have a body and is merely a head attached to Amy. Petunia states she can do better than a slot-player when Fry reveals he controls only one arm. Petunia later joins the Feministas in Into the Wild Green Yonder. She has children and used to live in a house with wheels.

=== Sal ===
Sal (voiced by John DiMaggio) is a surly, overweight, blue-collar worker with a thick Bronx accent. His first appearance is as a janitor on the Moon in "The Series Has Landed", servicing the machines in the amusement park. He has appeared many times since, always employed in a tedious job that he does not perform well. He is also seen to have a painting tattooed on his stomach (in "The Cryonic Woman") and comments that he is "on loan from the Louvre". His trademark is to add an "s" to many words that do not need it: "He's busteds. Gets hims outta heres!" At one point in "The Lost Adventure", it is implied that it is intentional, when he says "I gots an idea. I means, I gots an ideas." David X. Cohen said in a commentary that the writers debate whether Sal frequently changes jobs or has been cloned many times. He was also featured in Bender's Game as the five-time winner of a demolition derby. After losing the derby, he promises to "changes" his life.

=== Scoop Chang ===
Scoop Chang (voiced by David Herman in seasons 2-4, Maurice LaMarche in seasons 5-7, Feodor Chin in season 8) is a recurring newspaper reporter often seen at press conferences. The news organization he is associated with and position at that organization changes as a running gag. He is initially introduced as a reporter for the Beijing Bugle. Throughout Scoop's later appearances, he has been a New New York Times Online podcast blog comments editor, a contributor to Fox Quote-Unquote "News", and an editor for the New New York Times crossword smartwatch edition.

=== Tinny Tim ===
Tinny Tim (voiced by Tress MacNeille) is an ill-fated orphan-bot with a crutch for an arm and one shortened leg, a reference to Tiny Tim in Charles Dickens' A Christmas Carol. He speaks with an English accent and is programmed to beg, sell oil-ade, and write in cute backwards letters on signs. A running gag is that he is always violently abused in some way, such as being tripped by Bender, or run over by the Crushinator, or having his crutch kicked off. He is shown with the Planet Express crew on both Xmases, and appears to be friends with Dwight and Cubert. In the subtitles of "Bender Should Not Be Allowed on TV", he is called "Tiny Tim-Bot".

=== Boxy ===
Boxy is a crude robot only able to communicate by beeping. He is frequently seen in the company of Calculon, and played the role of Calculon's half-brother in the All My Circuits soap opera where his objections sound like he is backing up. His noise is made by a synthesizer.

=== Brain Slugs ===
Brain Slugs are small, one-eyed, vaguely sluglike aliens which attach themselves to the heads of sentient beings to control them. Brain slugs apparently use this as a method of trapping more "prey", since those beings under brain slug control are driven by the desire to place brain slugs on other beings. It is hinted that the host under the brain slug's control retains awareness of their condition, which Hermes referred to as a "nightmare". The brain slug can be seen in numerous episodes, normally attached to Hermes. For a short time, Fry had one attached, but according to the professor, it "starved to death".

=== Brain Spawn ===
The Brain spawn (voiced by Maurice LaMarche) are a race of flying telepathic brains that wish to collect all of the data in the universe and kill all other intelligent beings, because the mere act of them thinking causes them great pain. They are able to use "stupefaction fields" to render all intelligent beings on a planet too stupid to resist them. This allows them to collect all knowledge on the planet and destroy it. Their main enemies are the Nibblonians, who send Nibbler on a mission to find Fry, the only being resistant to the Brain spawn. Fry lacks the delta brainwave, due to himself being his own grandfather, so he is able to repel the Brain spawn when they attack Earth. Fry later sends the Brain spawn and their space station, the Infosphere, into another dimension with a bomb given to him by the Nibblonians.

=== Cookieville Minimum-Security Orphanarium ===
The Cookieville Minimum-Security Orphanarium houses a large number of orphans, including Leela during her childhood. The orphans often suffer harsh conditions and various disappointing setbacks. It is run by Mr. Vogel (voiced by David Herman) who takes care of the orphans and keeps all records; he is apparently a bureaucrat grade 135 who has not been promoted since about the time Leela was born. Three orphans, Albert (voiced by Kath Soucie), Nina (voiced by Kath Soucie), and Sally (voiced by Nicole St. John), are featured most often. Sally has a third ear on her forehead which she is teased about by the other orphans. She also claims to have a tail. Twelve of the orphans were briefly adopted and later returned by Bender—who adopted them only for the government fund checks—in "The Cyber House Rules".

=== Crushinator ===
The Crushinator (voiced by Maurice LaMarche) is the robot daughter of a robot farmer on the moon. She is stereotyped as a southern belle and represents Earth's moon in the Ms. Universe Pageant. She first appears in "The Series Has Landed" and also appears in the episodes "Lesser of Two Evils", "Crimes Of The Hot", "Mother's Day", and "The Silence of the Clamps". She briefly appears in the background in Into the Wild Green Yonder. Unlike her sisters, the Crushinator is more machine-like and has a masculine voice. She also has two orange metallic pigtails sticking out from her head and can transform into a car.

=== Father Changstein-El-Gamal ===
Father Changstein-El-Gamal (voiced by David Herman) is a priest in the First Amalgamated Church, a mixture of many 20th-century religions. He wears a bindi on his forehead (Hinduism), wears a mitre and clerical collar (Catholicism) with a taijitu (or yin-yang) symbol on the peak (Taoism), payot (Judaism), an orange wrap (Buddhism) with a shoulder scarf adorned with stars and moons (spiritism). In Bender's Big Score, he uses the phrases "dearly liked" instead of "dearly beloved" and "We are gathered here today before one or more gods, or fewer..." when officiating a wedding.

=== Flexo ===
Flexo (voiced by John DiMaggio) is a bending robot who looks and sounds almost exactly like Bender with the exception of having a small triangular metal goatee, a reference to the Star Trek mirror universe. Flexo first meets and befriends Bender in "Lesser of Two Evils". Fry believes Flexo to be an "evil twin" of Bender, though it turns out that Flexo attempts to stop Bender from stealing the expensive crown from the Miss Universe pageant. Flexo is mistaken for Bender and is arrested for that crime. Critics have called Flexo's appearance in this episode one of the "Great Moments" in Futurama. He returns in "Bendless Love" in which Bender briefly dates Flexo's ex-wife, Anglelyne, and impersonates Flexo. Flexo is targeted by the Robot Mafia because of this. Eventually, he reunites with Anglelyne. He makes a cameo appearance in Into The Wild Green Yonder along with Anglelyne as members of the audience seeing the Encyclopod being "born".

He makes another brief appearance in "Attack of the Killer App" in a garbage bin, where he is found by Bender and tells him that bending robots are now obsolete, though he is ignored. His signature character trait is the way he says something, usually a mild insult, and then immediately retracts it, laughing and saying some variation of "Naw, I'm just kidding... you're all right!" This, apparently, is also reversed when referring to situations or actions that cause him frustration or anger, such as Bender shoving him in one episode, with Flexo responding by saying, "Thanks! I appreciated that... Naw I'm kidding. That was quite annoying."

=== Grand Midwife ===
The Grand Midwife (voiced by Tress MacNeille) is an Amphibosian who first appears in the fourth-season episode "Kif Gets Knocked Up a Notch". She is also known as the Grand Priestess, the Grand Lunch Lady, the Grand Funeral Director, and the Grand Butterfly Curator, as she holds these various titles and positions. She appears as an aged and wizened member of the Amphibosian race, appearing at and overseeing key functions throughout Amphibios 9, including Kif's birthing ceremony, Kif and Amy's wedding and Kif's funeral. She is often direct and inflexible in her ways and acts in a melodramatic fashion.

=== Guenter ===
Guenter (voiced by Tress MacNeille, vocal effects provided by Frank Welker) is an intelligent monkey experiment made by Professor Farnsworth. His intelligence comes from his small hat which uses sunspots to create cognitive radiation. If he is not wearing the hat, he acts like a normal monkey. His first appearance was in the episode "Mars University" in which the Professor enrolls him at the university where he becomes Fry's roommate. Guenter later appears in the episode, "Fry and Leela's Big Fling", where he shows Amy Wong, Bender and Zoidberg around the planet Simian 7. Guenter is seen in other episodes in the background, and crowds.

=== Gypsy-Bot ===
The Gypsy-Bot (voiced by Tress MacNeille) is a carnival fortune-telling robot. In "Godfellas" the gypsy-bot hints that she does not actually have psychic powers; after Fry asks her a question, she replies, "What am I, psychic?". The gypsy-bot appears earlier in "The Honking", telling Bender he is a werecar; and in "Ghost in the Machines", performing a séance in which Bender's ghost possesses her and causes her head to explode.

=== Headless Body of Agnew ===
The headless body of Spiro Agnew (vocal effects provided by Maurice LaMarche) is Nixon's vice-president of Earth. Though he is headless, Agnew can still make growling noises. In "Into the Wild Green Yonder" Agnew is accidentally killed by the "eco-feministas" – which Leela has joined – when a golf cart runs over him. However, he is cloned, which leads Nixon to call him the "Headless Clone of Agnew".

=== H.G. Blob ===
Horrible Gelatinous "H.G." Blob (voiced by Maurice LaMarche) is a three-eyed, green, translucent, ill-tempered alien. He first appeared in the season one episode "The Series Has Landed" in a commercial the Professor made for Planet Express. He contemptuously refers to humanoids as "solids" and ridicules their one-way digestive system. In "The Route of All Evil", the Horrible Gelatinous Blob has a son named Brett Blob, who regularly bullies Cubert and Dwight. In Futurama: Bender's Big Score he, or someone of his species, appears on the twenty dollar bill. In "Proposition Infinity", he, or someone of his species, was shown to be in an "interplanetary" relationship with a human woman.

=== Judge Ron Whitey ===
Judge Ron Whitey (voiced by Billy West) is a judge and a member of the upperclass of Earth's elite. He was responsible for overcrowding in human mental asylums after ruling that poverty was a mental illness.

=== Kwanzaabot and Chanukah Zombie ===
Kwanzaabot (voiced by Coolio) and Chanukah Zombie (voiced by Mark Hamill) are Robot Santa's Kwanzaa and Hanukkah analogues. Precisely what role they play on their respective holidays is unknown. In the episode "A Tale of Two Santas", Kwanzaabot mentions he has been distributing books titled "What the Hell is Kwanzaa?" for 647 years, with little effect. Kwanzaabot and Chanukah Zombie are evidently friendly with Robot Santa, as he calls them for support in Bender's Big Score, and Kwanzaabot invites Bender to join him and the Chanukah Zombie at the B'nai B'rith in "A Tale of Two Santas".

From his first appearance, Kwanzaabot has been voiced by rapper Coolio. Although Chanukah Zombie had been mentioned, he did not appear onscreen until Bender's Big Score, in which he is voiced by Mark Hamill and in a reference to Hamill's famous role as Luke Skywalker in Star Wars, pilots a Jewish themed TIE Fighter decorated with Stars of David on its solar arrays with a Menorah standing on its core.

=== Malfunctioning Eddie ===
Malfunctioning Eddie (voiced by David Herman) is a robot that runs a hovercar dealership. His character refers to the real life electronics chain Crazy Eddie, and its mascot of the same name. It turned out that Malfunctioning Eddie's prices were so low that he really was insane. He had an exploding-problem associated with surprise in "Insane in the Mainframe".

=== Michelle Jenkins ===
Michelle Jenkins (voiced by Kath Soucie in "Space Pilot 3000", Sarah Silverman in all other appearances) is Fry's on and off ex-girlfriend from the 20th and 31st-century. She dumps Fry shortly before he is frozen on New Year's Eve for a man named Constantine (called Charles in "The Cryonic Woman"), whom she later marries. They eventually split up, and she decides to freeze herself to try again in the distant future. She wakes up in 3002, meets Fry again, and restarts her relationship with him. She fails to fit into the 31st-century life to which Fry has become so accustomed, and so asks him to freeze himself with her for another thousand years. After learning that the post-apocalyptic world that they awoke in is not New New York in the 4002, but rather Los Angeles in 3002, this plan fails, as does the rekindled relationship, so Fry leaves her. She later is shown in a limousine with the recently unfrozen Pauly Shore and later seen holding his hand in "Proposition Infinity".

In Bender's Big Score, it is revealed that Michelle had been frozen roughly 736 years longer than she had actually intended, a result of Fry's time duplicate using her cryotube to return to the future and be with Leela. This, along with the fact that Fry had accidentally broken off part of Michelle's hair while climbing into her cryotube, was not mentioned or shown in Michelle's previous appearances. She was one of the many people seen on the date with Yivo in The Beast With a Billion Backs.

=== Nibblonians ===
The Nibblonians are an ancient race that came into existence 17 years before the Big Bang. They have extremely long life spans and incredibly large appetites, and excrete extremely dense and potent dark matter. Despite their nature, other beings find their small stature to be extremely adorable. Their arch-enemy is the Brainspawn, and believe Fry is the only one capable of stopping them due to his lack of the Delta brainwave.

The main Nibblonians in the series are:

- Nibbler (voiced by Frank Welker)
- Ken (voiced by Billy West)
- Fiona (voiced by Tress MacNeille)

=== Nine ===
Nine (voiced by David Herman) is a man who wears a white gown with a large number 9 on it. He is both a conspiracy theorist and a conspirator. He is a cameo character appearing in the first and second production seasons of Futurama. He reappeared in Bender's Big Score and Into the Wild Green Yonder, where it was revealed he was the Grand Curator of the Legion of Mad Fellows. When Nine became grand curator is unknown, but the audio commentary track for Into the Wild Green Yonder hints that he was in the Legion prior to the year 3000. As grand curator (which is essentially a knowledgeable leader) of the Legion, he becomes the story teller for Philip J. Fry's mission to possibly end the epic long battle between two ancient races, as they by 3009 have noticed that the Chi have been re-emerging. It is later revealed in "Murder On the Planet Express" that he operates a discount spy store called For Your Eyes Mainly. He wears aluminum foil on his head to avoid other people's brain waves affecting him.

=== Mr. Panucci ===
Mr. Panucci (voiced by John DiMaggio) is the surly Italian-American owner of Panucci's Pizza where Fry worked before getting frozen. Although in the first episode it appears that he does not like Fry that much, it is shown in later episodes that he had a strong friendship with and acted as a father figure to Fry. It is revealed in Bender's Big Score that he likes Fry because Fry's life is so horrible it helps Panucci feel better about himself. Panucci is noticeably upset when Fry goes missing and he takes responsibility for Fry's pet dog Seymour.

In Bender's Big Score, Fry creates a time paradox by going back in time and living out his old life and thus continues working at Panucci's Pizza. Shortly after he arrives, Fry asks Panucci if he can live in Panucci's upstairs storeroom, which Panucci allows.

=== Pazuzu ===
Pazuzu (voiced by David Herman) is a gargoyle who Professor Farnsworth owned and put through college. He has a French accent and a son. He initially appears in "Teenage Mutant Leela's Hurdles", where he escapes from the Professor. He returns at the end of the episode to rescue the Professor and "earn [his] freedom."

He later appears in Beast With a Billion Backs, rescuing the Professor and Wernstrom from prison and informing the Professor that he has one wish left.

=== Randy Munchnik ===
Randy Munchnik (voiced by John DiMaggio) is a stereotypically gay man dressed in pink, who speaks in an effeminate voice. Originally, he is depicted with blond hair, but sometimes appears with brown hair.

John DiMaggio says he is his favorite character to voice. The original design for Randy was very different. He was originally an old man in a mob, with his name in the script for "I, Roommate" literally "Man in Mob". DiMaggio changed the voice and therefore the character.

=== Reverend Lionel Preacherbot ===
Reverend Lionel Preacherbot (voiced by Phil LaMarr) is a preacher at the Temple of Robotology. He presides over weddings and funerals of robots and humans. His speech patterns, accent, and mannerisms are modeled on those of stereotypical African-American Evangelical preachers (specifically, Black churches).

In the episode "Hell is Other Robots" (S01E09), Preacherbot encourages Bender to give up his addiction to recreational electricity in favour of the Church of Robotology, to which Bender replies; "Do I preach to you while you're laying stoned in the gutter?". In "Proposition Infinity", it is heavily implied that he may be a closeted robosexual. During the Season 6 episode "Ghost in the Machines", Preacherbot performs an exorcism on the Planet Express headquarters to drive off Bender's ghost, which has begun to possess various machinery in an attempt to kill Fry.

=== Sewer mutants ===
Sewer mutants are humans mutated by years of pollution and radioactive waste poured into the sewers under New New York. Because they are considered genetically inferior they were forbidden by law to travel to the surface without special permission (until the events of "The Mutants Are Revolting"), so they reside in a community made out of objects flushed down toilets.

Besides Turanga Leela, Turanga Morris, and Turanga Munda, among the known mutants in the series are:

- Dwayne (voiced by David Herman) - A mutant with two noses and a large forehead.
- Raoul (voiced by Maurice LaMarche) - The "Supreme Mutant", the democratically elected leader of the sewer mutants. His most notable mutation is a third arm which in his first appearance had grown in place of his right ear but above it in later appearances.
- Vyolet (voiced by Tress MacNeille) - A chain-smoking mutant with gills and a pig nose. She seems to be romantically involved with Raoul.

=== Don Cunningham (Transition Announcer) ===
Don Cunningham (voiced by Maurice LaMarche in most episodes, Billy West in "The Farnsworth Parabox") serves as the series' occasional narrator and transition announcer. He was initially heard in the "Anthology of Interest" episodes dramatically telling the audience to stay tuned for more "Tales of Interest!" He also occasionally narrates other episodes such as "The Why of Fry" and narrated the entirety of the podcast episode "Radiorama", where his name is revealed, and also appears in the same episode as a character as the announcer of the podcast episode of "All My Circuits". He physically appears for the first time in "Beauty and the Bot" as the announcer for a buggalo fight.

=== Dr. Cahill ===
Dr. Lauren Cahill (voiced by Tress MacNeille) is a doctor who works at the Head Museum. She exhibits the stereotypes of a blonde bimbo, such as having blonde hair, a breathy voice, a large bosom, and an hourglass figure, but she is actually quite educated. In Bender's Big Score, she helped a decapitated Hermes get into a jar. In "All the Presidents' Heads", it is revealed she is not actually uptight and joins the Planet Express crew's party with the Presidents' heads. She is also part of a book club as seen in "One is Silicon and the Other Gold", which is where her first name was revealed.

== Guest characters ==
=== Al Gore ===
The former vice-president (voiced by himself) appears as a head in a jar during most of his appearances and also appears with his body during scenes involving Fry's time period. He is First Emperor of the Moon and has "ridden the mighty moon worm". He lives in an elaborate jar; the base is colored silver-white, and possesses several hologram projectors, two small rockets for mobility, a pair of lasers, and is backed with the top of a cape. He plays a role in Futurama: Bender's Big Score, where he appears in multiple scenes that take place in the past and during the space battle in the future. During one of these scenes, Gore was shown to have won the 2000 Presidential Election, but Bender accidentally destroys the ballots in favor of Gore when hunting for Fry. During the Clinton presidency he is shown to have led the Vice Presidential Action Rangers, a group tasked by the US Constitution to preserve the space-time continuum.

The real-life Gore has said that Futurama is his favorite show. His daughter, Kristin Gore, was a writer for the show in its later seasons. Gore has also voiced the cartoon version of himself in "A Terrifying Message from Al Gore", the promotional video for An Inconvenient Truth along with John DiMaggio, the voice of Bender, and Billy West, the narrator.

=== Bill Nye ===
Nye (voiced by himself) first appeared alongside Neil deGrasse Tyson in the advertisement for the freemium mobile game Futurama: Worlds of Tomorrow, then in season 8's "Rage Against the Vaccine" where he discusses the Explovid-23 pandemic, and in season 9's "Attack of the Clothes" as the host of a science convention that Professor Farnsworth attends.

=== Cara Delevingne ===
Cara Delevingne (voiced by herself) severed head is used by the Professor Farnsworth in the season 9 episode "Attack of the Clothes" for his fashion-themed Frankenstein's monster.

Delevigne is also the voice of the Makeup Bot in the season 8 episode "The Impossible Stream" as well as other minor characters in this season.

=== Stephen Hawking ===
Stephen Hawking (voiced by himself) made a guest appearance in the episode "Anthology of Interest I" as a member of the Vice Presidential Action Rangers (VPAR), who guard the space-time continuum. Along with Hawking at the end of the twentieth century they include Al Gore, Nichelle Nichols, Gary Gygax and their summer intern Deep Blue. He first appears as a customer at the pizzeria where Fry mistakenly believes him to have invented gravity for which Hawking accepts credit ("Yeah, sure. Why not?"). After learning of Fry's inter-dimensional experience, he arranges for him to be kidnapped by the VPAR.

Hawking also appears in The Beast with a Billion Backs as his own head in a flying jar, leading a scientific convention organized to study and discuss a tear in the universe. He says that despite writing a book about it, he has no idea what it is, although he has already cashed the check he got for writing it. Apparently he has the ability to shoot lasers that stun people from his eyes; he himself is surprised, remarking, "I didn't know I could do that" after stunning Professor Farnsworth and Professor Wernstrom. He also makes a brief appearance during the "Future Challenge 3000" segment in "Reincarnation".

Due to a debilitating, long-term illness, Hawking was unable to speak with his own larynx, but his computer-assisted speech device was a trademark voice in popular culture.

== Films' characters ==
=== Lars Fillmore ===
Lars Fillmore (voiced by Billy West) is a technician at the Head Museum in Bender's Big Score, where he met Leela and briefly dated her. He was about to marry Leela, until he discovered that a paradox can not be in the normal time line, and decided to cancel the wedding, because he was really a paradox-duplicate of Fry created when the original Fry who had travelled back to 2000 went back a second time to eat a pizza, the original Fry who went back for the pizza freezing himself after a close call with a brainwashed Bender while the one who never did that moved into an apartment above the pizzeria where he worked. He lived there for twelve years, during which he spent time with his family and befriended the narwhal Leelu, until an assassination attempt by another brainwashed Bender burned away his hair and damaged his larynx. After the war with the scammers was over, Nudar tried to force Lars to reveal his version of the time-travel code, but Lars sacrificed himself to release another frozen Bender set to self-destruct, killing himself and Nudar. In "All the Presidents' Heads", Dr. Cahill briefly mistakenly calls Fry, who has taken a night job as a security guard at the Head Museum, "Lars", due to his resemblance.

=== Nudist Alien Scammers ===
The Nudist Alien Scammers are the main antagonist of Bender's Big Score. They are a group formed by the leader Nudar (voiced by David Herman) and his brothers Fleb (voiced by Frank Welker) and Schlump (voiced by Maurice LaMarche). They seek to seize the Earth by obtaining as much information as possible from humans, in addition to seizing all the valuable objects of the planet thanks to the time travel code. After they took over Earth, their fleet of solid gold Death Stars was destroyed by Earth's remaining ships in an assault led by Leela and coordinated by Hermes. Nudar escaped the destruction, but he was killed by the sacrifice of Lars Fillmore, a temporal paradox duplicate of Fry.

=== Leelu ===
Leelu (voiced by Maurice LaMarche) is a rare one-toothed female narwhal that the Fry paradox befriended in Bender's Big Score during the years he spent in the past. Throughout the years, their relationship blossomed and they became best of friends. The Fry paradox was heartbroken when he learned that Leelu was being released into the wild. When released, Leelu fell in love with an orange colored male narwhal.

=== Yivo ===
Yivo (voiced by David Cross) is a sentient extraterrestrial being from another universe who appears in The Beast with a Billion Backs. He communicated with universe "gamma" through the space-time hole, using his tentacles, which he used initially to mate with humans. He begins a "romantic relationship" with the inhabitants of the other universe, but even after the universe agreed to move in with Yivo, Yivo 'broke up' with the universe when Fry sent a letter back through the rift to Bender, as the electromatter that it was made from was used to produce weapon against him.

=== Colleen O'Hallahan ===
Colleen O'Hallahan (voiced by Brittany Murphy) is the chief of police and Fry's girlfriend in The Beast with a Billion Backs. A polyamorist, she lived with four other men which Fry was unable to cope with, causing him to break up with her. However, after Yivo evicts the universe's inhabitants for Fry's contact with Bender, Colleen continues a relationship with Yivo, remaining in the alternate universe after the dimensional rift is sealed.

=== The Dark One ===
The Dark One (voiced by Phil LaMarr) is the main antagonist of Into the Wild Green Yonder. He is a creature with the intention of ending the universe, and the last of his species. Towards the end of the film it is discovered that he is really the desert muck leech that lived on Mars, and that Leela welcomed as a pet to prevent his death. He is ultimately defeated and eaten by Zoidberg.

== Family tree ==
Futurama family tree

Great-Grandmother Turanga	David Farnsworth
Norm, Sam and Sadie	Harold Zoid	Grandmother Turanga	Philip J. Fry (Note: A literal grandfather paradox caused by accidental time travel in "Roswell That Ends Well" is solved by Philip J. Fry becoming his own grandfather (and in turn grandson).) Lars Fillmore (Note: Time travel-created duplicate, as established in Futurama: Bender's Big Score.)	Mildred Fry	Enos Fry	many generations over 500 years
Leonardo "Leo" Wong	Inez Wong	Mr. and Mrs. Kroker	Turanga Munda	Turanga Morris	Yancy Fry, Sr.	Mrs. Fry (née Gleisner)	Philo Farnsworth
Marianne	Dr. John Zoidberg	Amy Wong	Kif Kroker	Turanga Leela	Philip J. Fry Lars Fillmore	Yancy Fry, Jr.	Mrs. Fry
Newt, Mandy and Axel Wong-Kroker	Njörd	Philip J. Fry II
Barbados Slim	Hermes Conrad	LaBarbara Conrad	many generations over 1,000 years	many generations over 1,000 years
Grandma Farnsworth	Grandpa Farnsworth
Mrs. Rodriguez	Vladimir	Dwight Conrad
Bev	Velma Farnsworth	Ned Farnsworth
Calculon	Bender Bending Rodriguez	Dr. Ogden Wernstrom	Mom; Carol Miller	The Professor; Hubert J. Farnsworth	Floyd Farnsworth
Ben Vending Rodríguez First Son	Walt	Larry	Igner	Cubert Farnsworth

== See also ==
- List of The Simpsons characters
