= Futurama season 6 =

6th season of Futurama

Futurama
- Season 6
- DVD cover for Volume Five featuring Bender (left) and Volume Six featuring Leela
- Showrunner: David X. Cohen
- No. of episodes: 26

Release
- Original network: Comedy Central
- Original release: June 24, 2010 – September 8, 2011

Season chronology
- ← Previous; Season 5 Next → Season 7

The sixth season of Futurama originally aired on Comedy Central from June 24, 2010, to September 8, 2011, and consisted of 26 episodes. The season marks the change of networks from Fox to Comedy Central.

The first 13 episodes (known as Season 6-A) aired during 2010, and the remaining 13 episodes (known as Season 6-B) aired during 2011. This makes the episode "The Futurama Holiday Spectacular" the mid-season finale, despite airing almost twelve weeks after Futurama's 100th episode. The final episode of the season, "Reincarnation", aired on September 8, 2011 as a three-segment non-canonical special after the official season finale.

The first 13 episodes of the season have been released on a box set called Futurama: Volume 5, on DVD and Blu-ray Disc. It was released in the United States and Canada, on December 21, 2010, and on UK DVD on boxing day 2011. The remaining 13 episodes are available on a box set called Futurama: Volume 6, which was released in the United States and Canada on December 20, 2011. Both volumes have all episodes ordered in production order as was the case with Volumes 1–4.

== Production ==
With the future of the series uncertain at the time of production, the final of the four film releases that comprise Season 5 was designed to stand as the series finale. However, both Matt Groening and David X. Cohen had expressed a desire to continue the franchise in some form, possibly a theatrical film. Shortly before the films concluded airing in their episodic form, 20th Century Fox announced that Comedy Central had picked up the show for 26 new half-hour episodes that began airing on June 24, 2010.

Due to budget concessions, the number of returning writing staff had to be reduced. Initial voice actor contract talks resulted in a dispute, with 20th Century Fox reportedly refusing to meet the cast's demands for $75,000 per episode. The claim was strenuously denied by members of the cast, and on July 17, 2009 Fox announced that auditions would be held to recast the characters. Groening and Cohen had no part in the discussions, with the former stating "we hope that Fox and the actors can come to an agreement as soon as possible." It was speculated by some in the media that this was merely a ploy in order to get the cast to agree to Fox's offer, citing a similar situation with the cast of The Simpsons as a previous example. The dispute resulted in the voice cast being unable to attend the Futurama booth at Comic Con 2009. However, a deal was struck and on July 31, 2009, it was announced that the full original voice cast would be returning.

Groening, Cohen and the cast expressed extreme optimism for the return of Futurama, with Katey Sagal and Phil LaMarr claiming that the new season's episodes are "hysterical" and "the best yet". Commenting on the revival, Groening revealed that several plots for the upcoming episodes had actually been devised during or even before the original run of the series. Groening has also explained that he had been inspired by J. J. Abrams' Star Trek film, and had even considered rebooting Futurama, before opting for a "rebirth".

"Overclockwise" was originally written to serve as an open-ended series finale, much in the way that the season 4 episode "The Devil's Hands Are Idle Playthings" and the film Into the Wild Green Yonder were produced, in case the show did not get renewed. It was eventually announced on March 24, 2011, that the show was renewed by Comedy Central for a seventh production season.

== Cast and characters ==
=== Regular ===
- Billy West as Philip J. Fry, Professor Farnsworth, Zoidberg, Zapp Brannigan, Richard Nixon's Head, Smitty, Leo Wong, Gus, Hydroponic farmer, Ipji, Judge Ron Whitey
- Katey Sagal as Turanga Leela
- John DiMaggio as Bender, Randy, Sal, Flexo, Igner, URL, Hermaphrobot, Elzar, Mutant Colonel, Robot Santa, Barbados Slim, Joey Mousepad, Yancy Fry, Sr., Mr. Panucci
- Tress MacNeille as Petunia, Mom, Monique, Calculon, Linda, Charlotte Widnar, Brett Blob, Ndnd, Mrs. Astor, Turanga Munda, Vyolet, Leela's Grandmother, Tinny Tim, Esther, Hattie McDoogal, Dr. Lauren Cahill, Spotty Teen Robot, Gypsy-Bot, Chief O'Manahan, Fanny, Bella, Mrs. Fry
- Maurice LaMarche as Kif Kroker, Don Cunningham, Scoop Chang, Morbo, Calculon, Walt, The Hyperchicken, Hedonismbot, Thubanian Leader, Fishy Joe, Lrrr, Hobsy, Raoul Inglis, H.G. Blob, Mr. Astor, The Borax Kid, Dandy Jim, Clamps, Donbot, The Space Pope, The Crushinator
- Lauren Tom as Amy Wong, Inez Wong, Ruth
- Phil LaMarr as Hermes Conrad, Preacherbot, Bubblegum Tate, Dwight Conrad, Robot God
- David Herman as Scruffy, Mayor Poopenmeyer, Larry, Roberto, Fatbot, Animatronio, Dr. Wernstrom, Dr. Banjo, Dr. Ben Beeler, Emperor Nikolai, Turanga Morris, Dwayne, Big Rock Alien, Terry, Pickles, Warden Vogel, Dr. Tenderman, Josh Gedgie

=== Recurring ===
- Dawnn Lewis as LaBarbara Conrad, Amana
- Kath Soucie as Cubert Farnsworth, Albert, Nina
- Frank Welker as Nibbler, Various Animals
- Nicole St. John as Sally

== Episodes ==
Comedy Central chose to air the second half of this season out of the intended production order. This list is depicted in production order as this is the order used in Volume 6 and intended by the producers.

No. overall	No. in season	Title	Directed by	Written by	Original release date	Prod. code	U.S. viewers (millions)
Part 1
89	1	"Rebirth"	Frank Marino	Story by : David X. Cohen & Matt Groening; Teleplay by : David X. Cohen	June 24, 2010	6ACV01	2.92
Set after the events of Into the Wild Green Yonder, Fry finds his body covered in severe burns but cannot remember why. Professor Farnsworth reveals that the wormhole the Planet Express crew flew through to escape Zapp Brannigan led them back to Earth, where both ships crashed and killed everyone else. Farnsworth uses a birthing machine and resurrects everyone except Leela, who emerges in a supposedly irreversible coma. Devastated, Fry creates a robot replica of Leela with all her memories uploaded into it to continue their newfound relationship. However, the real Leela reawakens from her coma and gets into a fight with the robot Leela over Fry. Fry refuses to shoot either Leela when given the choice and accidentally shoots himself instead, and is revealed to be a robot as well. Farnsworth explains that the real Fry died protecting Leela in the crash and could not be resurrected in the then-incomplete birthing machine, so Leela made a robot replica of him that malfunctioned, killing her and leaving the robot Fry's body burned. Suddenly, the real Fry emerges from the birthing machine as it turns out the process was merely delayed for him. The robot Fry and Leela become a couple since they are already in love with each other, as do the real Fry and Leela, and the Planet Express crew celebrate their complete return.
90	2	"In-A-Gadda-Da-Leela"	Dwayne Carey-Hill	Story by : Carolyn Premish & Matt Groening; Teleplay by : Carolyn Premish	June 24, 2010	6ACV02	2.78
A rogue death sphere called the V-GINY, bent on censoring and destroying planets it deems to be indecent, is headed for Earth. Leela volunteers to destroy the death sphere, and reluctantly allows Zapp to come along. Their attack is disrupted and they crash land on an unknown planet similar to the Garden of Eden. Zapp shows his concerns for Leela's safety, causing Leela to gradually grow attracted to him. The two witness Earth's apparent destruction and decide to repopulate the human race à la Adam and Eve. At this point, however, Leela notices that some "fruit" Zapp had given her was actually trail mix Fry gave her, and Zapp confesses that everything was merely an elaborate scheme, including the Earth's destruction which was faked using a holographic projector from their ship, for her to think better of him and have sex with him. Furthermore, the two are actually on an island serving as the last unspoiled spot of nature on Earth. The V-GINY arrives at Earth and decides to spare it if "Adam" (Zapp) and "Eve" (Leela) have sexual intercourse, which they do much to the horror of the Planet Express crew. Guest star: Chris Elliott as V-GINY
91	3	"Attack of the Killer App"	Stephen Sandoval	Patric M. Verrone	July 1, 2010	6ACV03	2.16
Everyone in New New York buys the latest, state of the art eyePhone, a device developed by Mom which is implanted in a person's eye that allows users to record videos and post them online. Fry and Bender challenge each other to see who can gain one million followers on their Twitcher accounts, with the loser having to dive into a pool of goat vomit and diarrhea. With Bender in the lead, Fry resorts to posting an embarrassing video of Leela revealing she has a singing boil on her rear named Susan, gaining him enough followers to end the bet with a tie. However, Leela is humiliated, so Fry posts a video of himself diving into the pool out of guilt, which everyone watches and causes them to forget about the video of Leela. Fry and Leela reconcile, completely unaware that Mom has infected all of Fry and Bender's followers with a virus that turns them into mindless zombies to make them buy more eyePhones. Guest star: Craig Ferguson as Susan Boil
92	4	"Proposition Infinity"	Crystal Chesney-Thompson	Michael Rowe	July 8, 2010	6ACV04	2.01
Kif breaks up with Amy when she begins showing interest in "bad boys", which leads her to become attracted to Bender. The two engage in a secret robosexual relationship, a taboo romantic relationship between a robot and a human, much to the prejudice of Farnsworth since one of his girlfriends from his youth left him for a robot. With the support of the rest of the crew, Bender and Amy become engaged and hold a ballot proposition called Proposition Infinity, which they hope will lift the ban on robosexual marriage, with Farnsworth representing the opposing party. While arguing against Bender, Farnsworth suddenly remembers that his old girlfriend was also a robot. Not wanting to lose the debate after revealing he too was robosexual, Farnsworth has a change of heart and supports Proposition Infinity, which is passed as law and legalizes robosexual marriage. However, Bender leaves Amy and begins dating fembots again when he realizes that robosexual marriage is monogamous. Fortunately for Amy, she gets back together with Kif after discovering that he has by now adopted a "bad boy" attitude for her. Guest star: George Takei as himself
93	5	"The Duh-Vinci Code"	Raymie Muzquiz	Maiya Williams	July 15, 2010	6ACV05	2.20
Fry discovers a drawing of Leonardo da Vinci's fabled lost invention hidden in the inventor's beard that Farnsworth had kept. Farnsworth examines The Last Supper and discovers that the image of Saint James was painted over that of an ancient robot. The Planet Express crew go to Rome, enter Saint James' crypt and find the robot, Animatronio, who seemingly dies before he can reveal any information. Further clues and investigation lead the crew to the Pantheon, where they uncover Leonardo's secret workshop filled with all his inventions. Animatronio suddenly reappears, having faked his death, and tries to kill the crew to keep the discovery a secret, but unwittingly reveals that all of Leonardo's inventions assemble to form a spacecraft. Fry and Farnsworth enter the craft and are taken to Vinci, a planet inhabited by humanoid intellectuals including Leonardo himself, who came to Earth as a means to escape being bullied as the stupidest among his peers, but became infuriated by how much more stupid its inhabitants were. Leonardo uses his missing drawing to build a giant machine designed to kill his tormentors, but Fry sabotages it before it can do so. As a last resort, Leonardo pulls a lever on the machine which drops a giant cog on him and crushes him to death. Fry and Farnsworth then take the spacecraft back to Earth.
94	6	"Lethal Inspection"	Ray Claffey	Eric Horsted	July 22, 2010	6ACV06	1.92
Bender learns that he was never given a backup unit that allows the memories of robots to be uploaded into new bodies when they die, meaning he is not immortal as he always thought. With the help of Hermes, Bender decides to confront his inspector from when he was first manufactured, known to him only as Inspector 5. All information on Inspector 5 turns up missing at the Central Bureaucracy where he worked, so Bender calls Mom's Friendly Robot Company to report his fatal defect. Not wanting a flawed robot to roam around in public, Mom sends killbots after Bender. Bender's and Hermes' escape takes them to Tijuana, Mexico, where Bender was manufactured. Bender goes to Inspector 5's home to find once again that he is not there, and is forced to accept his own mortality. The killbots continue to try and kill Bender until Hermes fakes his death by accessing Inspector 5's database and labels Bender as "terminated", ending the pursuit. Bender returns home with Hermes with newfound pride in his mortality, oblivious as Hermes pulls out Inspector 5's missing profile and burns it, revealing himself as Inspector 5. A series of flashbacks then show how Hermes overrode the baby Bender's defect and quit his job because he could not bring himself to dispose of him, and how he kept all information on his identity a secret during the search with Bender.
95	7	"The Late Philip J. Fry"	Peter Avanzino	Lewis Morton	July 29, 2010	6ACV07	2.05
Fry arrives late for lunch with Leela on her birthday and promises to make it up to her by taking her to Cavern on the Green that evening. Before he can leave to meet her for their date, Farnsworth forces him and Bender to test his new time machine by sending it forward in time by one minute, so Fry decides to make a birthday video recording card apologizing to Leela for being late again. Unfortunately, Farnsworth accidentally sets the machine to send them into the year 10,000 AD, and the card is lost in the time vortex outside. Because their time machine can only travel into the future, Fry, Bender, and Farnsworth continue traveling through time until a backwards time machine is invented. Meanwhile, Leela assumes Fry stood her up again to go a robot strip club which is reported to have been destroyed in an accident, leading her to believe he is dead until she reads his card, which reappears in the year 3050. Realizing Fry did not mean to stand her up, Leela goes back to Cavern on the Green and leaves a message in stalagmites for Fry to find, reading how she cherished their time together. Fry finds the message in the year One Billion, when all life is extinct. With no hope of finding another time machine, Fry, Bender, and Farnsworth watch the end of the universe together, which leads to a second Big Bang. The time machine returns to the point in time before it first left, crushing the new universe's Fry, Bender, and Farnsworth beneath it in the process and allowing Fry to reach his date with Leela on time.
96	8	"That Darn Katz!"	Frank Marino	Josh Weinstein	August 5, 2010	6ACV08	1.95
Amy applies for her doctorate in applied physics by presenting a thesis for harnessing the power of Earth's rotation, but is interrupted due to her allergy to the committee chairman Professor Katz's cat and rejected. The cat follows the Planet Express crew home and summons a group of other cats in a flying saucer to brainwash the rest of the crew except for Amy and Nibbler, who discover Katz's cat to be the chairman's true identity and all cats to be a hyper-intelligent alien race from Thuban 9, a planet that lost its rotation and led to extreme temperatures on both the Eastern Hemisphere and Western Hemisphere. Katz uses Amy's thesis to build a machine powered by the brainwashed crew that transfers Earth's rotational energy to Thuban 9. Free from the cats' control, the crew is unable to reverse the process when Amy suddenly realizes they can instead continue it until they restore the planet's rotation, albeit in the opposite direction. The plan is successful, once again halting the rotation of Thuban 9, and Amy receives her doctorate for her efforts.
97	9	"A Clockwork Origin"	Dwayne Carey-Hill	Dan Vebber	August 12, 2010	6ACV09	1.96
Farnsworth tries to prove the theory of evolution to creationist orangutan Dr. Banjo by discovering and presenting the final missing link between ape and man, but is dismissed when Banjo becomes the curator of the museum where Farnsworth displays his archeological find. Farnsworth decides he would rather not live on Earth anymore and has his crew relocate him to a distant, lifeless asteroid, using nanobots to turn the toxic minerals present into a habitable landscape. In mere hours, the nanobots evolve into robotic trilobites and devour the Planet Express ship. While trying to survive over the next few days, the crew witnesses the trilobites evolve into mechanical dinosaurs, which are wiped out by a solar flare and allow robotic mammals to evolve into modern-day humanoids. The crew is discovered by a robot naturalist who brings the discovery of intelligent, carbon-based life forms to the attention of the robot society, but Farnsworth is put on trial when he reveals the creationist-like fact that he is the source of their society. By the time the court reaches a verdict the next day, the robots have evolved into energy-based life forms and abandon the issue altogether, deeming it beneath them. The crew returns to Earth using a ship made from robot dinosaur parts and, in the wake of Farnsworth being the catalyst of robot evolution, Farnsworth and Dr. Banjo reconcile their differing beliefs.
98	10	"The Prisoner of Benda"	Stephen Sandoval	Ken Keeler	August 19, 2010	6ACV10	1.77
Farnsworth switches his body with Amy's using his latest invention so that he can relive his youth and Amy may gorge out like she always wanted. Upon doing so, they find they cannot switch their bodies back with each other, so they try to see if they can return to normal by switching their minds with the rest of the crew. Bender volunteers to switch minds with Farnsworth so he can use Amy's body to rob the yacht of Robohungarian emperor Nikolai, while Farnsworth joins a circus in Bender's body. Bender is caught by Nikolai, but tricks him into switching bodies with a robot bucket so he can live the life of an emperor. However, he discovers that Nikolai's wife and cousin are plotting to kill him, but is rescued by Farnsworth. Meanwhile, Leela switches bodies with Amy in Farnsworth's body when she comes to believe that Fry only loves her for her body, which leads to Fry switching bodies with Zoidberg to get back at her. To prove neither of them are shallow, the two go on a date and try to gross each other out until they ultimately make out and have sex. Amy, who switched bodies with Hermes after overeating in Leela's body so he may slim it back down, witnesses them making out and loses her appetite for good. In the end, everyone returns to their original bodies by adding the bodies of two Globetrotters who deduced the solution to the equation.
99	11	"Lrrreconcilable Ndndifferences"	Crystal Chesney-Thompson	Patric M. Verrone	August 26, 2010	6ACV11	1.98
Lrrr becomes unmotivated in his conquering of planets due to a midlife crisis. He tries to take over Earth to appease Ndnd, but fails when he arrives at Comic Con where he is mistaken for a costume contest participant, and is subsequently kicked out of his home by Ndnd. He moves into the Planet Express building and decides to take up dating again, falling in love with a female Omnicronian named Grrl until he discovers her to be a human in a costume who saw him at Comic Con. Lrrr decides to follow Leela's advice to win back Ndnd by staging an invasion of Earth broadcast by Orson Welles à la the 1938 "War of the Worlds" broadcast, which not only fools Ndnd, but also tricks Earth into actually surrendering. Leela scolds Lrrr and demands he tell Ndnd the truth, but he is unable due to her renewed romantic interest in him. Lrrr is later caught with Leela by the suspicious Ndnd and admits he faked the invasion and had an affair with Grrl, but Ndnd disregards those facts as she is only upset that he is letting Leela nag him. Lrrr is forced to prove his love to Ndnd by shooting Leela with a disintegration ray, but as he fires, Fry takes the shot and sacrifices himself to protect Leela. Ndnd gets back together with Lrrr since he was at least willing to shoot Leela, and Fry is found to be alive since the "disintegration ray" turns out to be a novelty teleportation ray. Guest stars: Sergio Aragonés as himself, David X. Cohen as himself, Matt Groening as himself and Katee Sackhoff as Grrrl
100	12	"The Mutants Are Revolting"	Raymie Muzquiz	Eric Horsted	September 2, 2010	6ACV12	1.79
After making their 100th delivery, for which Bender organizes a huge party, the Planet Express crew is invited to a fund raiser for giving sewer mutants the needed donations to keep them away from the surface. Seeing how upset Leela is by this, Fry publicly lets slip that she is a mutant living illegally on the surface, causing her to be banished to the sewers for life. Feeling guilty for ruining Leela's life, Fry and the Planet Express crew appeal to the mayor to let her live on the surface again, but they are instead banished to the sewers for two weeks for knowingly harboring a mutant on the surface, minus Bender, who is enjoying the party. To appease Leela's anger and understand the life of a mutant, Fry jumps into a pool of toxic waste and emerges as a hideous blob. Leela is moved by Fry's sacrifice and decides to lead a mutant rebellion against the surface people by getting Bender, who ends up stopping the party after realizing it is no fun without the rest of the crew, to bend the giant sewer pipes together, thus backing up all the pipes around the city and flooding the surface with sewage. The mayor complies to the mutants' demands for equal rights, allowing them to finally live on the surface. Furthermore, it is revealed that Fry had not mutated, but was merely stuck in the body of another mutant. Afterwards, the Planet Express crew has a second "100th Delivery" party since they missed out on the first. Guest star: Mark Mothersbaugh as himself Note: This episode was dedicated in memory of Alex Johns, a producer of Futurama who died on August 7, 2010.
101	13	"The Futurama Holiday Spectacular"	Ray Claffey	Michael Rowe	November 21, 2010	6ACV13	1.30
A holiday special featuring three holiday-themed segments, following the same structure as the episodes "Anthology of Interest I" and "Anthology of Interest II." The three segments are based around the three winter holidays previously featured on Futurama: Xmas, Kwanzaa and Robanukah. Guest stars: Al Gore as himself and Coolio as Kwanzaabot
Part 2
102	14	"The Silence of the Clamps"	Frank Marino	Eric Rogers	July 14, 2011	6ACV14	1.41
Bender goes into witness relocation after testifying against the robot Mafia.
103	15	"Möbius Dick"	Dwayne Carey-Hill	Dan Vebber	August 4, 2011	6ACV15	1.46
While picking up a memorial statue of Planet Express's first crew, Leela becomes dangerously obsessed with catching a space whale, à la Captain Ahab from Moby Dick.
104	16	"Law and Oracle"	Stephen Sandoval	Josh Weinstein	July 7, 2011	6ACV16	1.55
Fed up with his go-nowhere job, Fry joins the police force and is promoted into the Future Crimes Division, where he must choose between his job and his friend, Bender, after seeing him commit a future crime. Meanwhile, the Planet Express office gets a lot less funny during Fry's departure.
105	17	"Benderama"	Crystal Chesney-Thompson	Aaron Ehasz	June 23, 2011	6ACV17	2.47
Bender creates duplicates of himself to get out of doing work, but the clones end up replicating and causing mass intoxication when they reach atomic level and manipulate the water molecules into alcohol. Meanwhile, an ugly space giant (voiced by Patton Oswalt) invades Earth. Guest star: Patton Oswalt as Giant Unattractive Monster
106	18	"The Tip of the Zoidberg"	Raymie Muzquiz	Ken Keeler	August 18, 2011	6ACV18	1.38
The Planet Express crew learn the truth about Farnsworth and Zoidberg's pasts.
107	19	"Ghost in the Machines"	Ray Claffey	Patric M. Verrone	June 30, 2011	6ACV19	1.92
Bender commits suicide (actually gets murdered, since the suicide booth is still bitter over Bender dumping her) after Fry saves a human during the Parade Day parade instead of a robot, and the only way out of being a wandering spirit is to scare Fry to death by haunting him. Guest star: Dan Castellaneta as Robot Devil
108	20	"Neutopia"	Edmund Fong	J. Stewart Burns	June 23, 2011	6ACV20	2.50
Gender roles and sexuality get turned on their heads when an alien traps the men and women of Planet Express on an abandoned planet and conducts experiments on how men and women interact.
109	21	"Yo Leela Leela"	Frank Marino	Eric Horsted	July 21, 2011	6ACV21	1.41
After failing at telling a story to the children at her old orphanarium, Leela comes up with a new story about weird aliens who laugh, sing, and learn important life lessons, which makes her the creator of the Tickelodeon Network's newest show -- until Bender learns the secret behind Leela's success. Guest star: Tom Kenny as Abner Doubledeal
110	22	"Fry Am the Egg Man"	Dwayne Carey-Hill	Michael Rowe	August 11, 2011	6ACV22	1.46
Disgusted over the state of fast food, Leela decides to put everyone on an organic diet, and Fry nurtures a farmer's market egg housing a bone vampire.
111	23	"All the Presidents' Heads"	Stephen Sandoval	Josh Weinstein	July 28, 2011	6ACV23	1.49
Fry takes a second job as a head museum janitor, and a late night party leads to a trip back in time where the Planet Express crew's meddling leads to the British defeating America during the American Revolution.
112	24	"Cold Warriors"	Crystal Chesney-Thompson	Dan Vebber	August 25, 2011	6ACV24	1.52
Fry inadvertently reintroduces the common cold (which died out 500 years before Fry was revived) to the 31st century, while flashbacks tell the story of how Fry adopted a guinea pig for a school science project. Guest stars: Buzz Aldrin as himself and Tom Kenny as Yancy Fry Jr.
113	25	"Overclockwise"	Raymie Muzquiz	Ken Keeler	September 1, 2011	6ACV25	1.57
Bender is overclocked by Cubert, gradually becoming more powerful in computing ability, until eventually becoming omniscient and clairvoyant. Meanwhile, Fry and Leela worry about their future together and Mom sues Farnsworth over abusing Bender's warranty.
114	26	"Reincarnation"	Peter Avanzino	Aaron Ehasz	September 8, 2011	6ACV26	1.48
An episode featuring Futurama animated in three retro styles: "Child Labor Syndicate Presents: Colorama in Glorious Black and White" has Futurama as a black-and-white, rubber-hose cartoon from the 1930s, "Future Challenge 3000" has the show as an early 1980s low-resolution video game, and Action Delivery Force has the show as a 1970s Japanese cartoon. Guest star: Stephen Hawking as himself

== Home releases ==
Futurama Volume 5
Set details			Special features
13 episodes (Season 6-A); 2-disc DVD set/2-disc Blu-ray Disc set; 1.78:1 aspect ratio; Languages: English (DTS-HD Master Audio 5.1) (Blu-ray only); English (Dolby Digital 5.1) (DVD only); Subtitles: English SDH; French; Spanish			Optional commentaries for all 13 episodes; Deleted and extended scenes; "Bend it Like Bender" featurette; "Previously On..." featurette; "Fry's Crudely-Drawn Comic Book – The Crudely Animated Edition" featurette; "Behind the Fungus: Makin' a Hit Song" featurette; "The Prisoner of Benda" table read; Hidden Concept Drawings Of "Delivery-Boy Man" Easter egg (media); Hidden Bender audio outtake Easter egg (media)
Release dates			Optional commentaries for all 13 episodes; Deleted and extended scenes; "Bend it Like Bender" featurette; "Previously On..." featurette; "Fry's Crudely-Drawn Comic Book – The Crudely Animated Edition" featurette; "Behind the Fungus: Makin' a Hit Song" featurette; "The Prisoner of Benda" table read; Hidden Concept Drawings Of "Delivery-Boy Man" Easter egg (media); Hidden Bender audio outtake Easter egg (media)
Region 1	Region 2	Region 4	Optional commentaries for all 13 episodes; Deleted and extended scenes; "Bend it Like Bender" featurette; "Previously On..." featurette; "Fry's Crudely-Drawn Comic Book – The Crudely Animated Edition" featurette; "Behind the Fungus: Makin' a Hit Song" featurette; "The Prisoner of Benda" table read; Hidden Concept Drawings Of "Delivery-Boy Man" Easter egg (media); Hidden Bender audio outtake Easter egg (media)
December 21, 2010	December 26, 2011	November 2, 2011	Optional commentaries for all 13 episodes; Deleted and extended scenes; "Bend it Like Bender" featurette; "Previously On..." featurette; "Fry's Crudely-Drawn Comic Book – The Crudely Animated Edition" featurette; "Behind the Fungus: Makin' a Hit Song" featurette; "The Prisoner of Benda" table read; Hidden Concept Drawings Of "Delivery-Boy Man" Easter egg (media); Hidden Bender audio outtake Easter egg (media)
Blu-ray Disc release dates			Optional commentaries for all 13 episodes; Deleted and extended scenes; "Bend it Like Bender" featurette; "Previously On..." featurette; "Fry's Crudely-Drawn Comic Book – The Crudely Animated Edition" featurette; "Behind the Fungus: Makin' a Hit Song" featurette; "The Prisoner of Benda" table read; Hidden Concept Drawings Of "Delivery-Boy Man" Easter egg (media); Hidden Bender audio outtake Easter egg (media)
Region A	Region B Europe	Region B Australia	Optional commentaries for all 13 episodes; Deleted and extended scenes; "Bend it Like Bender" featurette; "Previously On..." featurette; "Fry's Crudely-Drawn Comic Book – The Crudely Animated Edition" featurette; "Behind the Fungus: Makin' a Hit Song" featurette; "The Prisoner of Benda" table read; Hidden Concept Drawings Of "Delivery-Boy Man" Easter egg (media); Hidden Bender audio outtake Easter egg (media)
December 21, 2010	December 26, 2011	March 28, 2012	Optional commentaries for all 13 episodes; Deleted and extended scenes; "Bend it Like Bender" featurette; "Previously On..." featurette; "Fry's Crudely-Drawn Comic Book – The Crudely Animated Edition" featurette; "Behind the Fungus: Makin' a Hit Song" featurette; "The Prisoner of Benda" table read; Hidden Concept Drawings Of "Delivery-Boy Man" Easter egg (media); Hidden Bender audio outtake Easter egg (media)

Futurama Volume 6
Set details			Special features
13 episodes (Season 6-B); 2-disc DVD set/2-disc Blu-ray Disc set; 1.78:1 aspect ratio; Languages: English (DTS-HD Master Audio 5.1) (Blu-ray only); English (Dolby Digital 5.1) (DVD only); Subtitles: English SDH; French; Spanish			Optional commentaries for all 13 episodes; Deleted and extended scenes; "Professor Farnsworth's "Science of a Scene"" featurette; "Reincarnation Explained! With Director Peter Avanzino" featurette; "Futurama F.A.Q. (Frequently Axed Questions)" featurette; Animatic of Season 7 episode "The Bots and the Bees" (exclusive to BD-Live); Hidden Emmy Award Easter egg (media); Hidden Original Mr. Peppy concept artwork Easter egg (media)
Release dates			Optional commentaries for all 13 episodes; Deleted and extended scenes; "Professor Farnsworth's "Science of a Scene"" featurette; "Reincarnation Explained! With Director Peter Avanzino" featurette; "Futurama F.A.Q. (Frequently Axed Questions)" featurette; Animatic of Season 7 episode "The Bots and the Bees" (exclusive to BD-Live); Hidden Emmy Award Easter egg (media); Hidden Original Mr. Peppy concept artwork Easter egg (media)
Region 1	Region 2	Region 4	Optional commentaries for all 13 episodes; Deleted and extended scenes; "Professor Farnsworth's "Science of a Scene"" featurette; "Reincarnation Explained! With Director Peter Avanzino" featurette; "Futurama F.A.Q. (Frequently Axed Questions)" featurette; Animatic of Season 7 episode "The Bots and the Bees" (exclusive to BD-Live); Hidden Emmy Award Easter egg (media); Hidden Original Mr. Peppy concept artwork Easter egg (media)
December 20, 2011	June 24, 2013	December 21, 2011	Optional commentaries for all 13 episodes; Deleted and extended scenes; "Professor Farnsworth's "Science of a Scene"" featurette; "Reincarnation Explained! With Director Peter Avanzino" featurette; "Futurama F.A.Q. (Frequently Axed Questions)" featurette; Animatic of Season 7 episode "The Bots and the Bees" (exclusive to BD-Live); Hidden Emmy Award Easter egg (media); Hidden Original Mr. Peppy concept artwork Easter egg (media)
Blu-ray Disc release dates			Optional commentaries for all 13 episodes; Deleted and extended scenes; "Professor Farnsworth's "Science of a Scene"" featurette; "Reincarnation Explained! With Director Peter Avanzino" featurette; "Futurama F.A.Q. (Frequently Axed Questions)" featurette; Animatic of Season 7 episode "The Bots and the Bees" (exclusive to BD-Live); Hidden Emmy Award Easter egg (media); Hidden Original Mr. Peppy concept artwork Easter egg (media)
Region A	Region B Europe	Region B Australia	Optional commentaries for all 13 episodes; Deleted and extended scenes; "Professor Farnsworth's "Science of a Scene"" featurette; "Reincarnation Explained! With Director Peter Avanzino" featurette; "Futurama F.A.Q. (Frequently Axed Questions)" featurette; Animatic of Season 7 episode "The Bots and the Bees" (exclusive to BD-Live); Hidden Emmy Award Easter egg (media); Hidden Original Mr. Peppy concept artwork Easter egg (media)
December 20, 2011	June 24, 2013	March 28, 2012	Optional commentaries for all 13 episodes; Deleted and extended scenes; "Professor Farnsworth's "Science of a Scene"" featurette; "Reincarnation Explained! With Director Peter Avanzino" featurette; "Futurama F.A.Q. (Frequently Axed Questions)" featurette; Animatic of Season 7 episode "The Bots and the Bees" (exclusive to BD-Live); Hidden Emmy Award Easter egg (media); Hidden Original Mr. Peppy concept artwork Easter egg (media)
