= Ghost in the Machines =

- Futurama episode
- Episode no.: Season 6 Episode 19
- Directed by: Ray Claffey
- Written by: Patric M. Verrone
- Production code: 6ACV19
- Original air date: June 30, 2011

Guest appearances
- Dan Castellaneta as Robot Devil

Episode features
- Opening caption: #1 most viewed show among viewbots

Episode chronology
← Previous "The Tip of the Zoidberg"	Next → "Neutopia"
- Futurama season 6

"Ghost in the Machines" is the nineteenth episode in the sixth season of the American animated television series Futurama, and the 107th episode of the series overall. It originally aired June 30, 2011, on Comedy Central. The episode was written by Patric M. Verrone and directed by Ray Claffey. American actor Dan Castellaneta guest stars in the episode, voicing the Robot Devil. In the episode Bender, angry at Fry for valuing human life over robot life, kills himself in a suicide booth. Afterwards, he becomes a ghost, and learns from the Robot Devil that he is in limbo, and he cannot leave. Sharing a mutual dislike towards Fry, the Robot Devil offers to return Bender to his old body in exchange for using his new ghostly powers to scare Fry to death.

The episode was written by Patric M. Verrone and directed by Ray Claffey. From May 15 to May 19, as part of its "Countdown to Futurama" event, Comedy Central Insider, Comedy Central's news outlet, released various preview materials for the episode. "Ghost in the Machines" received mixed to positive reviews from critics, who praised the episode's jokes, but felt that the resolution of the episode was predictable.

== Plot ==
During an accident at the annual city Parade Day, Bender witnesses Fry save a human, and not a robot, from being crushed to death. Incensed that Fry believes a human life to be worth more than a robot's, Bender goes to the nearest suicide booth. However, the suicide booth in question turns out be his ex-girlfriend Lynn, who murders Bender for dumping her. Because of the "murder", Bender becomes a ghost stuck in an infinite loop in robot limbo, where his software operates on the global wireless network. Unable to interact with anything or communicate with anyone on Earth, Bender is annoyed until he finds that the Robot Devil can hear and see him. The Robot Devil declares his anger with Fry over having been briefly stuck with his hands in "The Devil's Hands Are Idle Playthings", and makes a deal with Bender that he will return him to his body if he scares Fry to death. If Bender fails, he will be damned to Robot Hell for all eternity.

Though initially unsuccessful, Bender discovers that he can possess machines, and does this to attack Fry at home and work. After an unsuccessful séance with Gypsy-Bot, Hermes calls in Reverend Preacherbot to perform an exorcism. Preacherbot gives Fry a "sacramental firewall" that wards off malicious software within a short range. While Fry sleeps that night, Bender possesses the device and uses it to frighten Fry, causing Fry to suffer a heart attack. Bender returns to Robot Hell to reclaim his body, but the Robot Devil informs him that Fry has survived. In the hospital, Bender prepares to deliver one last scare that will kill Fry, but stops when Fry tearfully reveals that Bender's death taught him the true value of a robot's life. Bender is touched and refuses to kill him. Fry, terrified of the mechanical possessions, moves to the Amish Homeworld, where no machinery is allowed. Bender joins Fry, affectionately following him around as he adapts to his new life on the Amish Homeworld, but is unable to interact with his friend.

When the crew visit the homeworld, the Robot Devil covertly arrives and insists that Bender must kill Fry. Bender refuses, now believing that human and robot life are equally important. The bulls pulling an Amish buggy are able to sense Bender's presence and become spooked, causing a giant geodesic dome barn to fall loose and roll towards an oblivious Fry. With no means of warning him, Bender possesses the Robot Devil's body (the only machine on the planet) and pushes Fry out of harm's way. The Robot Devil's body is crushed to death by the barn, and both Bender and the Robot Devil descend into Robot Hell as ghosts. The Robot Devil inhabits a spare body and taunts Bender for giving up his one chance at corporeality. Bender remains unfazed, happy to have sacrificed his life for Fry. He then immediately ascends to Robot Heaven for his good deed, but irreverently possesses Robot God in an attempt to return to Earth. Robot God ejects Bender back to Earth, where he inhabits his former body, which has reassembled itself. Bender and Fry happily reconcile until Fry accuses Bender of haunting him.

== Production ==
The episode was written by Patric M. Verrone and directed by Ray Claffey. From May 15 to May 19, as part of its "Countdown to Futurama" event, Comedy Central Insider, Comedy Central's news outlet, released various preview materials for the episode, including a storyboard of Fry being given the key to New New York City, stills, and concept art of an Earthican Pride parade float.

On June 15, series co-creator David X. Cohen revealed that Dan Castellaneta would be reprising his role as the Robot Devil. On June 28, two days prior to the premiere of the episode, Comedy Central released a two-minute clip depicting Bender's death.

== Cultural references ==
The title "Ghost in the Machines" can be traced back to philosopher Gilbert Ryle's book, The Concept of Mind, where the idea of the "ghost in the machine" is described. A scene in the episode featuring Reverend Preacherbot standing in front of Planet Express in the middle of the night is a reference to the 1973 horror film The Exorcist. The Robot Devil is seen reading a magazine entitled Life in Hell, a reference to Futurama series creator Matt Groening's comic strip of the same name. At one point in the episode, the Robot Devil reveals via a Wikipedia article that Fry survived a heart attack Bender gave him; this prompts Bender to shout "Damn you, Obamacare!", a reference to American president Barack Obama's Patient Protection and Affordable Care Act. Reacting to his electric shaver coming after his armpits, Fry says "winter is coming!", a reference to the book and TV series Game of Thrones. After being attacked by Bender, Fry attempts to call the Ghostbusters, the ghost-hunting team from the film of the same name. The concept of machines coming to life was the central theme of Stephen King's movie Maximum Overdrive. The scene where Fry is attacked by a pineapple machine mimics the movie's possessed vending machine which shot soda cans to kill a man. The Robot Devil says to Bender, "I'm afraid your friend is about to become fully Buckminstered", in reference to the architect Buckminster Fuller, known for the style of structure that Fry and the Amish people built that rolled in Fry's direction.

== Broadcast and reception ==
"Ghost in the Machines" originally aired June 30, 2011, on Comedy Central. In its original American broadcast, "Ghost in the Machines" was viewed by an estimated 1.921 million households with a 0.91 rating in the 18–49 demographic. The episode was down two tenths of a point from the previous week's episode "Benderama".

"Ghost in the Machines" received mixed to positive reviews from critics. Zack Handlen of The A.V. Club wrote, "This show manages to earn sentimentality by so often seeming incapable of it, and 'Ghost' made things a little too easy." He graded the episode B+, calling it a "solid double", but feeling that some parts of the episode were rushed and predictable. Sean Gandert of Paste wrote, "It's not an instant classic, but "Ghost in the Machine" delivered on what an average Futurama episode should do." He gave the episode an 8.3/10, praising the episode's background gags and how the episode was able to fit in continuity. Matt Fowler of IGN wrote: "'Ghost in the Machines', was solid, but basic," and gave the episode an 8/10. While he found the episode funny, he also felt it was weaker than the previous week's episodes "Neutopia" and "Benderama", and wished that the episode had "a little more to say than 'Fry and Bender will always be friends no matter what,' because we kinda knew that, right?".
