= Fry Am the Egg Man =

- Futurama episode
- Episode no.: Season 6 Episode 22
- Directed by: Dwayne Carey-Hill
- Written by: Michael Rowe
- Production code: 6ACV22
- Original air date: August 11, 2011

Episode features
- Opening caption: The One Bright Spot in Your Life!

Episode chronology
| ← Previous "Yo Leela Leela" | Next → "All the Presidents' Heads" |
- Futurama season 6

"Fry Am the Egg Man" is the twenty-second episode in the sixth season of the American animated television series Futurama, and the 110th episode of the series overall. It originally aired August 11, 2011 on Comedy Central. The episode was written by Michael Rowe and directed by Dwayne Carey-Hill. In the episode Fry nurtures an egg purchased at a farmers' market, which later hatches into a living creature, which he names Mr. Peppy. However, upon learning of Mr. Peppy's identity and dangerous nature, Fry and the Planet Express crew decide to set him free into its home planet. They do this, only to discover that the planet's inhabitants experienced problems with Mr. Peppy's species, hunting them to extinction and intending to do the same with Mr. Peppy. The episode's title is a reference from the Beatles song "I Am the Walrus".

In May and June 2011, as part of its "Countdown to Futurama" event, Comedy Central Insider, Comedy Central's news outlet, released various preview materials for the episode, including storyboards, concept art and a preview video clip of the episode. "Fry Am the Egg Man" received generally positive reviews from critics.

== Plot ==
Leela forces the crew to follow a strict diet of all-organic food after growing distrustful of the quality of fast food. Upon learning that this new diet includes fertile eggs, Fry decides to nurture one of the eggs until it hatches into a small blue creature with acidic saliva who Fry names Mr. Peppy. The creature quickly grows in size until he becomes large enough to tear off Bender's arm, after which the crew decides that Mr. Peppy is too dangerous for Fry to keep as a pet. They discover that Mr. Peppy is a bone vampire, so named because of its ability to suck out the skeletons of living creatures. Because bone vampires are extinct on their home planet of Doohan 6 and are capable of asexual reproduction, the crew releases Mr. Peppy into Doohan 6's wilderness to restore the species.

Shortly after releasing Mr. Peppy, the crew learns from Doohan 6's locals that the bones of their livestock had been devoured by bone vampires, which led them to hunt the species to near-extinction. The planet's former bone vampire hunter Angus McZongo goes out to hunt Mr. Peppy when he seemingly breaks his vegetarian diet learned from Fry by attacking the planet's livestock. However, Fry decides to kill Mr. Peppy himself after he apparently attacks and injures Leela. Fry finds and shoots who he believes to be Mr. Peppy, only to discover it is Angus, who had learned that Mr. Peppy was a vegetarian after all and disguised himself as a bone vampire in an attempt to regain his popularity as a hunter (which also includes attacking Leela). Immediately after, the crew finds the real Mr. Peppy killing the planet's livestock for real, though the locals decide to let Mr. Peppy live to balance out their now overpopulated livestock, as well as to conveniently debone them for consumption.

== Production ==
The episode was written by Michael Rowe and directed by Dwayne Carey-Hill. From May 30 to May 31, and again on June 19, as part of its "Countdown to Futurama" event, Comedy Central Insider, Comedy Central's news outlet, released various preview materials for the episode. On May 30, concept art of Mr. Peppy was released; on May 31, storyboards of Fry and Bender ordering food at the Fishy Joe's drive-thru were released; on June 19, a preview video clip of the episode was released.

== Cultural references ==
The title is similar to the lyric 'I am the egg-man" in the song "I Am the Walrus". The bone vampires are similar to the legendary chupacabras rumoured to inhabit parts of the Americas. Professor Farnsworth reads about the bone vampires in a "medieval monster manual" which is a reference to a rulebook in Dungeons & Dragons. Furthermore, on its cover, a twenty-sided die (which is used in the game) is seen, along with the title "Gygaxicon", a reference to the game's co-creator Gary Gygax. The episode's conclusion references the usual conclusions of episodes of animated television series based around the American media franchise Scooby-Doo, particularly Scooby-Doo, Where Are You!, and includes Amy uttering Scooby-Doo character Velma Dinkley's trademark catchphrase, "Jinkies!". The song portrayed during Fry's roosting montage is "Eggman" by Eli Wolfe. Doohan 6 is named after James Doohan, who portrayed Montgomery Scott in Star Trek.

== Reception ==
In its original U.S. broadcast, "Fry Am the Egg Man" scored a 0.7 share among adults 18-49 and 1.462 million viewers, up about 3,000 views from the previous week's episode "Möbius Dick".

The episode received generally positive reviews from critics. Zach Handlen of The A.V. Club was positive towards the episode, describing it as "frequently snicker-worthy, a little bit sweet, and engaging throughout" and singling it out as one of his favorite episodes of the show's sixth season. Regarding the plot of "Fry Am the Egg Man", Gandert drew comparisons to recurring Futurama subplots regarding Leela and her pet Nibbler, and noted that the episode contained "familiar elements"; however, he noted that the episode "puts them together well, staying true to its characters and still managing to deliver a surprisingly happy ending." He especially praised the episode's use of the character Mr. Peppy, writing: "The episode could've tried to play up the contrast between Fry's perpetual, unquestioning affection for the animal by making Peppy as cold and violent as possible; instead, the bone vampire is about as lovable as bone vampires get, despite still eating bones and having acidic saliva." He gave the episode an overall A− rating.

Robert Canning of IGN also enjoyed the episode, praising the execution and humor of its first two acts; he too noted similarities between the plot of "Fry Am the Egg Man" and recurring Leela—Nibbler subplots, and praised the episode for using darker and different-toned jokes to make sure that "Fry Am the Egg Man" did not feel like a rethread of these subplots. However, he criticized the episode's conclusion and final act, writing: "I really enjoyed 'Fry Am the Egg Man,' until the last act when things just sort of petered out. The silly vignettes of the opening gave way to an interesting conflict on a distant planet, only to deliver a relatively weak ending. Does the ending ruin the entire half hour? Not by much, but instead of being the classic it could have been, Thursday night's episode was only pretty darn good." Giving the episode an overall 7.5/10 rating, he concluded his review by writing: "'Fry Am the Egg Man' was three-fourths of a fantastic episode. And then we got Scooby-Doo'd."
