= Overclockwise =

- Futurama episode
- Episode no.: Season 6 Episode 25
- Directed by: Raymie Muzquiz
- Written by: Ken Keeler
- Production code: 6ACV25
- Original air date: September 1, 2011

Episode features
- Opening caption: Soon to be a hit television show

Episode chronology
← Previous "Cold Warriors"	Next → "Reincarnation"
- Futurama season 6

"Overclockwise" is the twenty-fifth and penultimate episode of the sixth season of the American animated television series Futurama, and the 113th episode of the series overall. It originally aired September 1, 2011 on Comedy Central. The episode was written by Ken Keeler and directed by Raymie Muzquiz. In the episode, Bender is overclocked by Cubert Farnsworth, gradually becoming more powerful in computing ability, until eventually becoming omniscient and able to foresee future events. Meanwhile, Cubert and Professor Farnsworth are tried in court by Mom for violating Bender's license agreement, and Fry's relationship with Leela takes a turn for the worse.

The episode was originally written by Keeler to serve as an open-ended series finale, in case the show did not get renewed for another season. In June 2011, as part of its "Countdown to Futurama" event, Comedy Central Insider, Comedy Central's news outlet, released various preview materials for the episode, including storyboards, concept art and a preview video clip of the episode. "Overclockwise" received generally positive reviews from critics, who praised its premises and humor, but felt that the episode was not completely capable of holding its plots together.

== Plot ==
Cubert overclocks Bender to improve his performance in an online game. Walt, Larry, and Igner are defeated online by an enhanced Bender and complain to Mom, who has both Cubert and Professor Farnsworth arrested for overclocking Bender (a violation of Bender's license agreement). She also sends an army of robots to capture Bender so he can be reset to his original settings. Due to heightened intelligence caused by his overclocking, Bender is able to anticipate future probabilities and connects himself to a water cooler to prevent overheating. He anticipates the arrival of Mom's robots, and manages to destroy them and steal their processors, increasing his capacities even further. Bender then leaves Planet Express to find a new, larger coolant. Meanwhile, Leela begins thinking about her on-again, off-again relationship with Fry and admits to him her concerns over their future together.

At the trial overseen by Judge Ron Whitey, Cubert and the Professor are ordered to locate Bender, and are forced to pay $10,000 every day until he is found. With Planet Express going out of business as a result, Leela decides to leave, sadly breaking up with Fry. Heartbroken, Fry attempts to commit suicide by going over Niagara Falls in a barrel. There he discovers a cave behind the falls where Bender has developed into an omnipotent being, using the waterfalls as his new cooling system. Fry tries to convince Bender to help Professor Farnsworth and Cubert, but Bender is unconcerned with their troubles, stating that they are guilty and will be convicted. Fry believes that Bender is now practically omniscient, and therefore asks Bender if he has a future with Leela. Bender does not answer, but instead gets a sad expression on his face and tells Fry to leave.

After Fry returns to the trial, Bender has a change of heart and appears in court, accusing Mom of unfairly trying Cubert, a minor. Fearing that Cubert will gain the jury's sympathy, Mom drops charges against Cubert while still attempting to prosecute the Professor. However, Bender seeks a mistrial on the grounds of double jeopardy, declaring that by dropping charges against the Professor's clone, Mom is unable to press charges against the Professor for the same crime because they are legally the same person. The case is dismissed as the jury discards their written verdict to have Cubert and the Professor put to death. Enraged that she cannot prosecute the Professor, Mom forcibly captures Bender and resets him to factory settings. Leela returns to Fry, still wondering what the future holds for both of them. Bender reveals that he had written down his prediction of their future, which Fry and Leela silently read together. The contents of the prediction are not shown, but Fry and Leela's reactions indicate that their relationship will have its ups and downs but will ultimately have a happy ending.

== Production ==
The episode was written by Ken Keeler and directed by Raymie Muzquiz. In June 2011, as part of its "Countdown to Futurama" event, Comedy Central Insider, Comedy Central's news outlet, released various preview materials for the episode, including storyboards, concept art and a preview video clip of the episode. On June 7, concept art of the interior of overclocked Bender's head was released. The next day, concept art of Fry's video game character was released. On June 9, storyboards of Mom and her sons overlooking the Hoverfish were released. Finally, a preview video clip of Fry conversing with overclocked Bender was released on June 20.

"Overclockwise" was originally written to serve as an open-ended series finale, much in the way that the season 4 episode "The Devil's Hands Are Idle Playthings" and the film Into the Wild Green Yonder were produced, in case the show did not get renewed. It was eventually announced on March 24, 2011 that the show was renewed by Comedy Central for a seventh production season.

== Reception ==
In its original U.S. broadcast, "Overclockwise" scored a 0.8 share among adults aged 18–49, and 1.571 million total viewers, up from the previous week's episode "Cold Warriors".

The episode received generally positive reviews from critics. Zack Handlen of The A.V. Club was generally positive towards the episode, noting that it had "a lot of excellent moments" as well as praising that it addressed Fry and Leela's relationship problems. However, he noted that the episode "doesn't hold together well in retrospect", also writing: "Some episodes are greater than the sum of their parts; some aren't. This one feels like the latter." He also felt that "the story gets lost for a while in the third act, with a courtroom climax that doesn't make a whole lot of sense," though also noting that the episode "rebounds again in the final moments." He gave the episode an overall B+ rating.

Robert Canning of IGN felt that the episode was "uneven" and that parts of the episode felt out of place, such as Leela's boredom with her job and relationship. He also felt that the plot involving Bender's overclocking was not used to its full potential. While noting that he felt "the episode wasn't quite as good as the sum of its parts", he noted that "for the most part, [he] liked 'Overclockwise'", writing that "there were some good bits throughout", praising the use of Mom in the episode as well as scenes of the episode set in Niagara Falls; he also enjoyed its "sweet, touching" ending. He gave the episode an overall rating of 7/10.

Sean Gandert of Paste felt that the concept of overclocked Bender's prophetic nature was new and interesting, but felt that the concept "is completely subsumed by the myriad of subplots [in the episode] such that this is the most unfocused episode in a while." Though noting that the episode "isn't without its charms", he felt that the plots involving Bender's transformation into a godlike being and Fry and Leela's romance were "repetitions". Regarding the latter plot, Gandert felt that while he was "largely waiting for Futurama to return to the pair and what developed during the movies (or the end of the TV show)", he also felt their subplot in the episode was "just so fast and slapdash that it didn't really work for me." He enjoyed the episode's ending, but noted that "it also left me feeling that like every other development in their relationship, this one will soon be dropped by the wayside as soon as the next season begins." In his conclusion to the review, he wrote that "Overclockwise" was "not the finest ending for the season, but perhaps it's fitting for one that has been consistently quite good but rarely gone beyond that." He gave the episode an overall 6.9/10 rating.
