= Yo Leela Leela =

- Futurama episode
- Episode no.: Season 6 Episode 21
- Directed by: Frank Marino
- Written by: Eric Horsted
- Production code: 6ACV21
- Original air date: July 21, 2011

Guest appearance
- Tom Kenny as Abner Doubledeal

Episode features
- Opening caption: Penetrates even the thickest foil hat
- Opening cartoon: "The Goose That Laid the Golden Egg" (1936)

Episode chronology
← Previous "Neutopia"	Next → "Fry Am the Egg Man"
- Futurama season 6

"Yo Leela Leela" is the twenty-first episode in the sixth season of the American animated television series Futurama, and the 109th episode of the series overall. It aired on Comedy Central in the United States on July 21, 2011. The title is a reference to the Nick Jr. series Yo Gabba Gabba!. The show is also parodied within the episode: Leela’s show is similar, featuring people dressed up in fanciful costumes as its main characters.

== Plot ==
Leela visits the Cookieville Orphanarium for a storytelling session with the children there, but fails to make up a good story for the orphans. Hoping to come up with a better story, and seeking quiet from her disruptive crewmates, Leela takes the Planet Express ship elsewhere to write. She returns to the orphanarium with her story at the same time as Abner Doubledeal, CEO of the TV station Tickleodeon, comes to pitch new television shows to the children. The orphans are unimpressed with the new shows, but they enjoy Leela's new story, called "Rumbledy-Hump" and using colorful characters and morals, prompting Doubledeal to persuade Leela to write an educational children's television series based on her story.

Rumbledy-Hump, which is filmed in the Planet Express building and performed by Leela and the crew, quickly develops into a successful franchise. After her show wins at the Young People's Choice Awards, she becomes an egomaniac and starts to look down on her coworkers. She takes the Planet Express ship to her "quiet place" to write more episodes, but Bender, having stowed away to make out with a fembot from the awards ceremony, is aghast when he sees what Leela is doing: the "quiet place" is actually an unknown planet inhabited by the Rumbledy-Hump characters — "the Humplings" — who are real, and Leela's scripts are revealed to be word-for-word documentations of the Humplings' daily activities.

Despite agreeing to give Bender half of the show's earnings in exchange for keeping the secret, Leela becomes wracked with guilt over exploiting the Humplings for profit, especially when the Cookieville orphans visit the building during filming and one of them, Sally, draws a picture of her own characters to thank Leela for inspiring her. Leela brings the crew, Doubledeal, and the orphans to the planet to meet the Humplings and confesses her deception, disappointing the orphans and the Humplings.

But despite her initial dismay, Doubledeal comes up with a solution quickly, and takes advantage of the situation by turning Rumbledy-Hump into a reality show for kids. On top of that, he adopts the orphans to work as his film crew, additionally cutting costs drastically for the show. This proves beneficial to both the Humplings, who are paid and thus able to afford better lifestyles, and the children, who now have full-time jobs and a parent to take care of them all, even declaring that they love life on the planet Rumbledy-Hump. Leela is horrified that she is able to get away with making a bad example for the children, and pleads to be punished as the Humplings and children cheer and express their gratitude for her.

== Reception ==
Zack Handlen of The A.V. Club generally praised the episode, giving it a B+ rating. Handlen praised the episode's humor and writing, but said that it continued "a general trend this season of competence over risk."
