= Benderama =

- Futurama episode
- Episode no.: Season 6 Episode 17
- Directed by: Crystal Chesney-Thompson
- Written by: Aaron Ehasz
- Production code: 6ACV17
- Original air date: June 23, 2011

Guest appearance
- Patton Oswalt as Giant Unattractive Monster

Episode features
- Opening caption: Others ask, "What if?" We ask, "Why if."
- Opening cartoon: "Hollywood Capers" from Looney Tunes by Warner Bros. Cartoons (1935)

Episode chronology
| ← Previous "Law and Oracle" | Next → "The Tip of the Zoidberg" |
- Futurama season 6

"Benderama" is the seventeenth episode in the sixth season of the American animated television series Futurama, and the 105th episode of the series overall. It originally aired June 23, 2011 on Comedy Central. The episode was written by Aaron Ehasz and directed by Crystal Chesney-Thompson. American comedian Patton Oswalt guest stars in the episode, voicing an "unattractive giant monster". In the episode, Bender duplicates himself into two smaller copies in order to avoid work. However, the duplicates also want to avoid work, so they create their own smaller duplicates, resulting in a vast number of increasingly smaller copies of Bender ultimately threatening to consume all of the matter on Earth.

The premise of "Benderama" is the grey goo theory, an end-of-the-world scenario in which out-of-control self-replicating robots consume all matter on Earth while building more of themselves. "Benderama" received mostly positive reviews from critics, many of whom praised Patton Oswalt's guest appearance and noted that it was an improvement over the preceding episode "Neutopia".

== Plot ==
The Professor invents a machine that can scan an object and produce two smaller copies, consuming matter provided to it in the process. He uses it to make smaller sweaters for himself, since he is shrinking and feeling colder as he ages. Bender originally refuses the Professor's request to fold them, and then stores the replicator in his chest cavity and uses it to make two duplicates of himself so they can each fold one sweater. Before they can do so, the Planet Express crew and the duplicates are sent to deliver a shipment of personal hygiene products to an ugly giant alien humanoid who lives in a cave. He endures the crew's comments about his appearance until Fry inadvertently insults his mother, causing him to lash out and nearly destroy the ship before it escapes.

Back on Earth, Bender's two duplicates copy themselves in order to get four cigars for Bender. The process continues until there are eleven generations of Benders running around the Planet Express building; the crew quickly moves in to exterminate all the duplicates, but Bender admits to setting one free. As this one gives rise to a new swarm that keeps reproducing and consuming matter, including Bender's couch and beer, the Professor worries that they will eventually eat all matter on Earth. Leela points out that since the Benders are fueled by alcohol, they will run out of power once they have used up the world's supply. When this happens, the crew sweeps up the Benders and disposes of them.

As the Professor takes a bath, he is surprised to find that the water in the tub has turned into alcohol. Some of the Benders survived and have reached the molecular scale, where they can synthesize alcohol directly from water and carbon dioxide molecules. As a result, Earth's entire water supply becomes alcohol and its population gets extremely drunk. At this point, the giant alien arrives on Earth to apologize for his earlier outburst, even though the crew keeps drunkenly insulting him and Zapp Brannigan tries to destroy him with a tank. Unable to get hold of the therapist who has been helping him deal with his anger issues, the alien flies into another rage and starts tearing up the city. Bender, the only sober crew member, agrees to fight the alien if Fry will fold the Professor's two sweaters. Bender uses the hordes of tiny duplicates to form a giant version of himself and fight the alien hand-to-hand. He loses the fight after insulting the alien's mother, but the swarm quickly consumes the alien, reducing him to dust. Bender urges them to help him solve other worldwide problems, but they are too lazy to take part and leave Earth instead.

As the other crew members recover the next morning, the Professor is happy to note that someone finally folded his sweaters. When Fry asks Bender if he did this and learned a lesson about being lazy, Bender cryptically replies that perhaps he did, or perhaps he kept one of the Benders around to do the job for him. He then exhales cigar smoke, which turns out to be composed of thousands of microscopic and maniacally laughing Benders.

== Production ==
The episode was written by Aaron Ehasz and directed by Crystal Chesney-Thompson. Before its airing, the first act of the episode was read by the show's voice actors at Futurama's 2010 San Diego Comic Con panel.

=== Cultural references ===
"Benderama" features an episode of "The Scary Door", Futurama's ongoing parody of anthology television series The Twilight Zone. Bender says the line, "Hi, I'm Bender, this is my robot Bender and this is my other robot Bender."; this is a reference to the TV series Newhart, specifically the character of Larry, who introduced himself and his brothers with the line, "Hi, I'm Larry, this is my brother Darryl and this is my other brother Darryl."

== Broadcast and reception ==
"Benderama" originally aired June 23, 2011 on Comedy Central, immediately following the episode "Neutopia". In its original American broadcast, "Benderama" was viewed by an estimated 2.473 million households with a 1.1 rating in the 18–49 demographic.

"Benderama" received mostly positive reviews from critics. Zack Handlen of The A.V. Club wrote: "'Benderama' works because the script holds together, starting from the original premise, and then introducing complications over time." He graded the episode A−, praising the premise of the episode, as well as Patton Oswalt's voice work in the episode. Sean Gandert of Paste, reviewing both "Benderama" and "Neutopia", wrote: "Both of these are what other shows would call gimmick episodes, but with Futurama pretty much everything is a one-off and taking on these strange premises is really what the show's about." He gave both episodes an 8.4, and added: "If these two are any indicator, there's a good summer of episodes to look forward to." Blair Marnell of CraveOnline wrote: "'Benderama' had a lot of fun moments that helped negate the bad taste left behind by 'Neutopia'." He rated the episode 8/10. However, Marnell wrote that the writers should refrain from reusing what he called "'Bender uses experiment x' storylines", adding "There are only so many ways to reuse a plot and I don't want to see this series go downhill before its time."

== See also ==
- Grey goo
