= The Mutants Are Revolting =

- Futurama episode
- Episode no.: Season 6 Episode 12
- Directed by: Raymie Muzquiz
- Written by: Eric Horsted
- Production code: 6ACV12
- Original air date: September 2, 2010

Guest appearance
- Mark Mothersbaugh of Devo as himself

Episode features
- Opening caption: 100

Episode chronology
← Previous "Lrrreconcilable Ndndifferences"	Next → "The Futurama Holiday Spectacular"
- Futurama season 6

"The Mutants Are Revolting" is the twelfth episode in the sixth season of the American animated television series Futurama, and the 100th episode of the series. It aired on Comedy Central on September 2, 2010, as a mid-season finale, with remaining episodes broadcast in November 2010 and in 2011. In the episode, the Planet Express crew celebrate their 100th delivery. Leela's status as a mutant is exposed to the public and she is deported from the surface and forced to live with other mutants in the sewers. She recognizes the inequality with which mutants are forced to live and rallies them together in an equal rights revolt against the surface dwellers.

The episode was written by Eric Horsted and directed by Raymie Muzquiz. Mark Mothersbaugh of the band Devo guest stars as himself, while the band appears as future mutated versions of themselves. Having the 100th episode as the sixth-season finale was a coincidence. The production team sought to focus the episode's subject matter on a topic with roots in the series' history. They eventually chose to write about Leela's mutant heritage, which had been one of the series' longstanding storylines. "The Mutants Are Revolting" received generally positive reviews from critics. Although recognized as an unlikely landmark for Futurama by critics due to its previous cancellation, the episode was criticized for failing to live up to its status as the series' 100th episode. Devo's guest appearance is one of co-producer and head writer David X. Cohen's favorite moments in the series.

== Plot ==
The crew is hired for their 100th delivery and Bender plans the "party of the millennium". The wealthy widow Astor invites Fry and Professor Farnsworth to a fundraiser for mutant education. Leela notices that Astor and the socialites want to distract the mutants from their living conditions and social inequality. Fry accidentally reveals Leela as a mutant illegally living on the surface, and she is banished to the sewers. While attempting to appeal to Mayor Poopenmeyer on Leela's behalf, the crew is banished to the sewers for two weeks for harboring a mutant.

In the sewers, the crew finds the wreckage of the Land Titanic, a luxury land bus that sunk into the street in 2912 after striking a mailbox on its maiden voyage, with Astor's husband among the ship's dead passengers. They find the original passenger manifest and a priceless quantum-force gemerald from Astor's husband to his wife. Meanwhile, Bender (who stayed behind), is hosting the 100th delivery party at Planet Express but prematurely ends it and demands everyone leave when he realizes the remaining crew is absent. Fry attempts to reconcile with Leela, who rebuffs him. Determined to prove that he stands by Leela and mutants' plight, Fry jumps into the toxic sewage lake and emerges as a grotesque mutant blob. The crew is disgusted by Fry's new appearance, but Leela is touched by Fry's sacrifice and rallies the mutants and the crew to fight for equal rights. The mutants recruit Bender to sabotage the sewer system by bending the main sewage pipe, which sends waste up to flood the surface.

While the mutants demand desegregation and equal rights from Mayor Poopenmeyer, Astor tries to force them back underground using a wave of sewage held in Madison Cube Garden, but Fry uses the gemerald's energy to part the wave and defend the mutants. He shows the mayor and Astor the Land Titanic passenger manifest, which includes Leela's maternal grandmother, who worked on the Land Titanic when it sank. Leela's grandmother explains that Astor's husband gave up his reserved seat on the life car for her and her mother. The widowed Astor is moved and urges Mayor Poopenmeyer to support mutant equality. As he and Leela kiss over their victory, Fry's grotesque form melts away, revealing itself to be Astor's mutated husband who fell into the toxic lake and survived as the Land Titanic sunk; Fry had unknowingly lodged himself in the mutant's mouth. The Astors happily reunite, and the Planet Express crew throw another party in celebration together with Leela's family, who are now allowed access to the surface.

== Production ==
The episode was written by Eric Horsted and directed by Raymie Muzquiz. In an interview, series co-producer and head writer David X. Cohen stated that the 100th episode coinciding with the season finale was unplanned, with the staff only realizing it after receiving the broadcast schedule from Comedy Central. The episode serves as the official season finale to season six, which Cohen described as being a decision made by Comedy Central. Cohen considers all twenty-six episodes of the original order to comprise season six, since all the episodes were written and produced continuously, with no production gap between "The Mutants Are Revolting" and the remaining 14 episodes. In recognition of the episode as the series' landmark 100th, the staff decided to write a story that "had roots in the history of the show." They ultimately decided on the story involving Leela fighting for the rights of her people, the mutants, since her mutant heritage was a longstanding storyline in the series. The episode end credits feature a dedication in memory of Alex Johns, a former co-producer of Futurama who died on August 7, 2010.

The episode also guest starred Mark Mothersbaugh of the 1980s American rock band Devo. The band is portrayed as the mutated future versions of themselves and their song "Beautiful World" was used in the episode. Devo's guest appearance on the show became one of Cohen's favorite moments in the series.

== Theme and cultural references ==
The episode's plot contains a theme of equality and civil rights. "The Mutants Are Revolting" has been interpreted as a political warning against societies with a "disposable class" of people. It has also been interpreted as a statement about the plight of undocumented immigrants, due in part to Leela's secret status as an "illegal alien" in the series (as mutants are not allowed to live on the surface). Mr. Astor giving up his seat on the "lifeboat" for Leela's grandmother and great-grandmother may be a reference to Alfred Vanderbilt, a wealthy passenger on the Lusitania, who gave his life belt to a young woman and her child, though he himself could not swim. Ms. Astor, who invites the crew to the party, has a meal delivered that contains Nitroglycerin. This chemical is very explosive and is produced by nitrating glycerol with white fuming nitric acid under conditions appropriate to the formation of the nitric acid ester.

The episode also contains several cultural references, including references to P. L. Travers' character Mary Poppins, the 1984 horror film C.H.U.D., and the 1997 film Titanic. The song "Bend It" by the British 1960s pop group Dave Dee, Dozy, Beaky, Mick & Tich is used in this episode. The "Westside Pipeway" scene is reminiscent of a scene in the 1927 silent film Metropolis. The program suggests that Brown University is now located in the mutant underground. They refer to it as an "institution of lower learning. Leela also refers to the uprising of the mutants as the 'Million Mutant March' which references the 'Million Man March'. The episode also contains self-references, such as the inclusion of many one-time and recurring characters in the background of Bender's party scene. When Devo appear, they are asked to play "Whip It", their most successful single. Refusing, they decide to play "the other one" and perform "Beautiful World", one of only a few singles of theirs to find mainstream success. Near the end of the episode, Fry divides the wave of waste in two, preventing it from hitting the mutants and saying "let my people stay", which is a reference to the Crossing of the Red Sea and the "Go Down Moses" song. After this happens, one mutant says "Are we not men!", a reference to Devo's song "Jocko Homo", which includes the lyric "Are we not men? We are Devo", and also to their first album, Q. Are We Not Men? A. We Are Devo!.

== Broadcast and reception ==
"The Mutants Are Revolting" originally aired on Comedy Central on September 2, 2010. In its original broadcast, "The Mutants Are Revolting" was viewed by an estimated population of 1.792 million with a 1.2 rating/2% share in Nielsen ratings and a 0.9 rating/2% share in the 18–49 demographic, going down two tenths of a point from the previous week's episode "Lrrreconcilable Ndndifferences".

The episode was met with generally positive reviews from critics. Alasdair Wilkins of io9 gave the episode a positive review, calling it "brilliant" and writing, "'The Mutants are Revolting' is another excellent addition, with Futurama's customary mix of jokes, emotions, and wild ideas." Carlos Delgado of iF Magazine gave the episode a B, stating that it "was good, but not on par with the best episodes of the season. It did, however, meet all the criteria of what makes a good Futurama episode. There was the goofy and fun premise involving the two primary characters of the show, Fry and Leela. More importantly, Futurama takes full advantage of the fact that it is animated and set far in the future. And, of course, there's the usual witty banter and quirky one-liners that permeate every corner of the show. These elements combined to give us a nice farewell to a successful comeback season." Robert Canning of IGN gave the episode a positive review, rating it an 8.5/10. Canning described "The Mutants Are Revolting" as a solid and funny, quality episode, but felt that it did not have the landmark feel of a 100th episode. Merrill Barr of Film School Rejects gave the episode a positive review, feeling that although the episode was not as funny as other episodes from the season, it "was perfect in its own way. It was straight forward and never missed a beat." Barr also praised the episode's subtle jokes and lack of "forced topicalness".

Alex Zalben of UGO was disappointed with the episode, calling it a "bummer episode" and "one of the weakest entries this season." Zalben criticized the episode for covering familiar territory, noting the civil rights theme in the same season's earlier episode "Proposition Infinity" and the Titanic jokes of first season's "A Flight to Remember". He also criticized the formulaic writing style, comparing it unfavorably to The Simpsons. Zack Handlen of The A.V. Club gave the episode a mixed review, stating that it had some funny jokes, but "wasn't hilarious", and rated it a B+. He also criticized the Titanic gag, calling it "lazy", but enjoyed some of the cultural references and the guest appearance of Devo.
