= Reincarnation (Futurama) =

- Futurama episode
- Left to right: Bender, Hermes, Leela, Dr. Zoidberg, Fry, Professor Farnsworth and Amy as depicted in the episode's third segment.
- Episode no.: Season 6 Episode 26
- Directed by: Peter Avanzino
- Written by: Aaron Ehasz
- Production code: 6ACV26
- Original air date: September 8, 2011

Guest appearance
- Stephen Hawking as himself

Episode features
- Opening caption: Reincarnation

Episode chronology
← Previous "Overclockwise"	Next → "The Bots and the Bees"
- Futurama season 6

"Reincarnation" is the 26th and final episode in the sixth season of the American animated television series Futurama, and the 114th episode of the series overall. It originally aired on Comedy Central on September 8, 2011. This is the only episode not to be animated in its regular animation style, instead featuring three different segments which each showcase Futurama "reincarnated" in a different style of animation. The plot of each segment forms part of an overall story arc, revolving around the discovery and subsequent destruction of a diamondium comet. A running joke for the episode involves a key plot point in each segment being obscured by the specific animation style, though the characters themselves express amazement over what they see.

The episode was written by Aaron Ehasz and directed by Peter Avanzino. Stephen Hawking guest stars during the second segment. David Herman voices Professor Farnsworth in the third segment, in place of regular voice actor Billy West.

== Plot ==
Prior to the episode's triptych structure, a brief introduction is given by the God entity from the 2002 episode "Godfellas"; "A wise man once said that nothing really dies, it just comes back in a new form. Then he died. So next time you see a lowly salamander, think twice before you step on it. It might be you. Stand by for reincarnation."

=== "Colorama" ===
The first segment is animated in a 1930s black-and-white "Fleischer and Walter Lantz style". Professor Farnsworth discovers a comet made of diamondium, the hardest substance in the universe, and sends the crew to gather diamond dust from the comet's tail to polish a doomsday device. Fry sneaks onto the surface of the comet and finds a large gem, which he hopes to give to Leela as an engagement ring. Fry plants the Professor's doomsday device on the comet and brings Leela to the balcony of the Planet Express building, thinking the resulting explosion will dislodge the gem and send it flying to land on her finger. It instead splits the comet in half, with one half flying towards the sun and creating a rainbow, and the other half flying into the rainbow and creating an entirely new color. Leela marvels at the beautiful sight, depicted entirely in grayscale. Before Fry can propose to Leela, the comet crumbles to dust that falls onto the Planet Express building, crystallising and trapping Fry and Leela in a giant diamond. One billion years later, an alien proposes to his alien girlfriend with a ring containing the diamond in which Fry and Leela are trapped.

=== "Future Challenge 3000" ===
The second segment is shown in the style of a 1980s low-resolution video game reminiscent of the 8-bit video era. Using the debris from the diamondium comet from the previous segment, Professor Farnsworth creates a microscope lens powerful enough to find the smallest unit of matter, which is described as extremely intricate but is depicted as a single black pixel. The Professor forms a scientific equation explaining the mysteries of the universe from this single unit, depicted as a squiggle of pixels on a blackboard, only to become depressed upon realizing that there are no further scientific questions to answer. Fry cheers him up by saying that he has yet to solve why the laws of the universe are what they are and not something else, thus giving scientists a reason to keep looking for answers about the universe.

=== "Action Delivery Force" ===
The third and final segment is drawn in an anime style. A race of gelatinous aliens who can only communicate through body language is angered by the destruction of the diamondium comet, which they worship as a god, and attack Earth in retaliation. The Planet Express crew attempts to relay a message of peace, but cannot communicate with the aliens since neither can properly understand the other's language. Fry and Bender attempt to deliver a message of Earth's peaceful intentions through dance, but the aliens interpret it as a declaration of hostility and open fire. Doctor Zoidberg persuades the aliens to leave by shedding his shell and performing an intricate dance universally symbolizing peace, which is depicted as Zoidberg merely posing his body and standing still while the camera pans across his body.

== Reception ==
The episode received highly positive reviews from critics and fans. IGN gave the episode an 8.5 out of 10, saying that it was "[a] fantastic way to bring this season of Futurama to a close".

At Salon, critic Matt Zoller Seitz wrote: "This brilliant show from David X. Cohen and Matt Groening has always been as pop culture history-conscious as Groening's better-known The Simpsons, but this episode takes that obsession to a new level. Packed with Easter egg-style visual gags, it's an orgy of nostalgia and visual invention, so densely imagined that it demands repeat viewings [...] Set your DVRs now." Zoller found the final segment, Action Delivery Force, to be "the craziest".

At The A.V. Club, Zack Hendlen gave "Reincarnation" an A, writing: "That was so, so, so much fun. I'm not even sure how I can properly review it. Futurama has done triptych episodes before. There were a couple "Anthology of Interest" episodes, and maybe something else I'm forgetting. But it's never been this playful with its form before, paying homage to trio of different styles without missing a beat or coming across as self-indulgent [...] what is important is that this was a joy to watch, and I already want to watch it again."

In 2013, it was ranked #9 "as voted on by fans" for Comedy Central's Futurama Fanarama marathon.
