= Möbius Dick (Futurama) =

- Futurama episode
- Episode no.: Season 6 Episode 15
- Directed by: Dwayne Carey-Hill
- Written by: Dan Vebber
- Production code: 6ACV15
- Original air date: August 4, 2011

Episode features
- Opening caption: Featuring Sparky, The invisible elf

Episode chronology
← Previous "The Silence of the Clamps"	Next → "Law and Oracle"
- Futurama season 6

"Möbius Dick" is the fifteenth episode in the sixth season of the American animated television series Futurama, and the 103rd episode of the series overall. It originally aired August 4, 2011 on Comedy Central. The episode was written by Dan Vebber and directed by Dwayne Carey-Hill. In the episode, the Planet Express crew pass through an area in space known as the Bermuda Tetrahedron, where many other ships passing through the area have mysteriously disappeared, including that of the first Planet Express crew. While exploring the area, a mysterious four-dimensional space whale devours the ship's engine, leaving them stranded in the area. The ship's captain, Leela, becomes obsessed with hunting down the whale.

In June 2011, as part of its "Countdown to Futurama" event, Comedy Central Insider, Comedy Central's news outlet, released three items of promotional material for the episode, including concept art, storyboards and a preview video clip of the episode. "Möbius Dick" received positive reviews from critics, who praised its story and humor.

== Plot ==
Professor Farnsworth sends the Planet Express crew to collect a monumental statue of his first crew for a memorial marking the 50th anniversary of their disappearance. To save time on the return to Earth after forcing the statue to be recarved to fix a grammar error, Leela travels through the Bermuda Tetrahedron where they find a graveyard of lost spaceships, including the first crew's Planet Express ship. While the crew investigates the ship, a four-dimensional space whale appears and devours the old ship and statue; Zoidberg, the only member of the first crew who returned to Earth, identifies the whale as the one responsible for the first crew's disappearance.

Leela becomes obsessed with killing the whale to take revenge for eating the statue and delaying their return to Earth in time for the memorial, and grows increasingly insane with each failed effort. The whale eventually devours the Planet Express ship and swallows the crew alive (with the exception of Zoidberg, who again returns to Earth in an escape pod). Inside the whale, Leela encounters the captain of the first crew, Lando Tucker, fused to the inside of the whale's belly. Lando explains that the whale feeds on obsession, luring obsessive space captains into the Tetrahedron to feed itself. Leela is fused to the whale's belly like Lando, but her overwhelming obsession with completing her delivery grants her control over the whale, allowing her to bring it to the Planet Express building in time for the memorial. She forces the whale to release everyone and everything it has swallowed, including the statue and the first crew. Despite acknowledging that the space whale is not a monster, as it merely follows its instinct, everyone proceeds to kill the whale out of revenge for swallowing them.

== Production ==
The episode was written by Dan Vebber and directed by Dwayne Carey-Hill. In June 2011, as part of its 2011 "Countdown to Futurama" event, Comedy Central Insider, Comedy Central's news outlet, released three items of promotional material for the episode. On June 1, concept art of the Planet Express ship modified to add sails was released; on June 2, storyboards of Zoidberg crashing into the Planet Express building were released; finally, on June 18, a preview video clip of the episode was released.

== Cultural references ==
The episode's title is derived from a combination of the Möbius strip and Herman Melville's 1851 novel, Moby-Dick. Perhaps citing the latter, repeated comparisons are made between Leela and Captain Ahab of Moby-Dick.

Some of the artwork associated with the space-whale's appearances is reminiscent of that of the cartoon artist Jean Giraud, who uses the name 'Moebius'.

The planet where the crew goes to pick up the memorial statue, Xenotaph 3, is a pun on the word cenotaph and the prefix xeno-.

The spaceship graveyard in the Bermuda Tetrahedron contains many spaceships from popular culture, including Discovery One from 2001: A Space Odyssey, Oceanic Airlines Flight 815 from the television series Lost, the Satellite of Love from the comic science fiction television series Mystery Science Theater 3000, the Jupiter II from the science fiction television series Lost in Space, the spaceship from the animated television series Josie and the Pussycats in Outer Space, the spaceship commonly seen on albums by Electric Light Orchestra, Journey and Boston, an Apollo Lunar Module with the ascent and descent stages still attached, an Apollo Command/Service Module labeled "Apollo 100", and Skylab. There are also two spaceships named after two popular GPS brands: Garmin and TomTom. The Fourth Doctor from the British science fiction television series Doctor Who, as portrayed by Tom Baker, makes a cameo appearance emerging from the body of the four-dimensional space whale near the end of the episode. The Monolith from 2001: A Space Odyssey also makes an appearance.

The scene where the crew find and enter the old Planet Express ship (whose crew's fate is unknown) is similar to a scene and the theme of the film Sunshine.

In the scene where Bender is on the lookout nest and sees the space whale emerge from the 4th dimension and exhales (breathing out a shape resembling a Julia set); Bender reports to Leela; "Look, off in the distance, it's exhaling!", Leela commands Bender to use "boaty talk", Bender sighs and rephrases what he says into, "Thar' she blows!", a popular phrase that was used in the Moby-Dick novel.

In the scene where the Planet Express crew are 'present' in the 4th dimension, their words are said forwards in time and backwards. Hermes expresses he can see sideways into time; Amy says "Gee, I see CGI". While Fry uses a palindrome phrase, "Poop. Heh heh", Bender instead experiences a looping conga line of Benders. Then as the space whale breaks through the 4th dimension, the Benders cascade back into one. Disappointed, Bender sighs in sadness and claims that it was 'the greatest uncountably infinite bunch of guys I ever met'.

In the scene where the Planet Express crew are, in Hermes' words, 'in the belly of the beast', Fry uses a reference of two characters from different books; Jonah, from the Old Testament/Tanakh; and Pinocchio, when he is swallowed by The Terrible Shark. Both characters that have been in the belly of a large whale/fish.

The scene where Leela and the other crew members emerge from the whale's mouth is reminiscent of the final scene in Close Encounters of the Third Kind where the alien abductees emerge from the mothership.

Lando Tucker, the captain of the first Planet Express crew, is likely a reference to Lando Calrissian, former captain of the Millennium Falcon and Charles "Trip" Tucker III, chief engineer of the NX-01 Enterprise. Also, his initials, LT, are the reverse of Leela's, TL.

During the chase for the whale, Leela tells Amy "Negative, Sailor Moon", an obvious reference to the anime series of the same name.

Towards the end of the episode, Inez Wong says, "My days of joy and luck are over. Guess I gotta quit that club." This is a reference to The Joy Luck Club, a novel by Amy Tan about the mother-daughter relationships in a group of Chinese American Immigrant families. Voice actor Lauren Tom played the role of Lena St. Clair in the film adaptation.

When the ship enters the Bermuda Tetrahedron, Leela mentions "Tickle Me Elmo's Fire", a combination of St. Elmo's fire and Tickle Me Elmo, a popular children's toy from the 1990s.

Right before the episode ends, while the Planet Express crew and others, who have emerged from the space whale, are off screen, apparently killing it, Zoidberg is approached by Candy, who seductively hints at a past relationship; Zoidberg runs a comb through his hair and styles it the same way as The Fonz, and ends the episode with his famous catchphrase, "Aaaay!"

== Reception ==
"Möbius Dick" originally aired on August 4, 2011 on Comedy Central. In its original American broadcast, "Möbius Dick" was viewed by an estimated 1.459 million viewers. The episode had a 0.8 share among adults 18-49. The episode was down about 34,000 viewers from the previous week's episode, "All the Presidents' Heads".

The episode received generally positive reviews from critics. Robert Canning of IGN praised the episode, calling it a "rollicking tale of adventure and laughs" and enjoying a return to plots involving deliveries, which he felt had been lacking in the new season. Giving the episode a rating of 8.5/10, he wrote: "It delivered a fun space adventure while keeping the laughs coming from every direction. Every character had their moments-- Amy's giraffe hunting flashback, for one-- which kept the entire half hour from getting bogged down with too much of one thing. I'll remember this one like it was interesting." Sean Gandert of Paste was also positive towards the episode, giving the episode an 8.4/10 rating. He felt that the episode was Futurama having "the most sheer fun [it's] had" in its sixth season, attributing this to the episode having the entire Planet Express crew prominently featured in the episode, writing: "...with so many personalities abounding, "Mobius Dick" [sic] didn't have to rely on just one type of humor. It wasn't an episode that made me think or left me moved, but "Mobius Dick" provided the biggest belly laughs I've had all season."

Zack Handlen of The A.V. Club was generally pleased with "Möbius Dick", giving it a B+ grade, but was more critical of the episode. While praising the episode's humor, he criticized the episode's opening segment for failing to properly set up Leela's role in the episode, writing: "...the focus of the episode is on Leela, and her obsessional nature, and by giving Farnsworth most of the screentime at the start, 'Dick' sacrifices an opportunity to re-establish Leela's intensity, to make it resonate better when she starts hunting down the whale. [...] ...since "Dick" is about Leela, and not about the first crew that went missing, Farnsworth's story comes off as vamping for time." Of the overall episode, he wrote: "The ep[isode] had some structural problems, but there were solid gags throughout, and the plot's basis in character helped hold the weaker jokes together. It's not a classic or anything, but it was solid from start to finish, even if all the pieces didn't fit together quite as snugly as they might have."
