= Series finale =

Final installment of an episode entertainment series

A series finale is the final installment of an episode entertainment series, most often a television series. It may also refer to a final theatrical sequel, the last part of a television miniseries, the last installment of a literary series, or any final episode.

== Origins in television ==
Most early television series consisted of stand-alone episodes rather than continuing story arcs, so there was little reason to provide closure at the end of their runs. Early comedy series that had special finale episodes include Howdy Doody in September 1960, Leave It to Beaver in June 1963, Hank in April 1966, and The Dick Van Dyke Show in June 1966. One of the few dramatic series to have a planned finale during this period was Route 66, which concluded in March 1964 with a two-part episode in which the pair of philosophical drifters ended their journey across America and then went their separate ways.

Considered to be "the series finale that invented the modern-day series finale", the August 1967 final episode of ABC's The Fugitive, "The Judgment: Part 2", attracted a 72% audience share when broadcast. This remained the highest viewership percentage in American television history until the 1977 finale of the TV mini-series Roots (on the same network) and later the 1980 resolution episode of the internationally prominent "Who shot J.R.?" cliffhanger of CBS' Dallas.

== Notable television series finales ==
=== Most-watched American series finales ===
No.	Year	Title	Views
1	1983	M*A*S*H	105 million
2	1993	Cheers	93 million
3	1967	The Fugitive	78 million
4	1998	Seinfeld	76.3 million
5	2004	Friends	52.5 million
6	1988	Magnum P.I.	50.7 million
7	1992	The Cosby Show	44.4 million
8	1979	All in the Family	40.2 million
9	1989	Family Ties	36.3 million
10	1999	Home Improvement	35.5 million
11	2004	Frasier	33.7 million
12	1991	Dallas	33.3 million
13	2005	Everybody Loves Raymond	32.9 million
14	1994	Star Trek: The Next Generation	31 million
15	1975	Gunsmoke	30.9 million
16	1984	Happy Days	30.5 million
17	1990	Newhart	29.5 million
18	1992	The Golden Girls	27.2 million
19	1995	Full House	24.3 million
20	1988	St. Elsewhere	22.5 million

The most watched series finale in American television history remains the 1983 finale of the CBS war/medical dramedy M*A*S*H, titled "Goodbye, Farewell and Amen". Viewed by 105.9 million viewers and drawing 77% of those watching televisions at the time, the finale of M*A*S*H held the record for most watched telecast of all-time for decades until 2010's Super Bowl XLIV edged it out with 106 million viewers, which coincidentally also aired on CBS. M*A*S*H's final episode, however, remains the all-time most-watched U.S. television episode (and so far, the only single television episode in American history to be watched by at least 100 million viewers for a single telecast).

The second-most-watched series finale in American television history was the 1993 finale of the NBC comedy Cheers, titled "One for the Road". "One for the Road" was watched by between 80.4 million and 93.5 million viewers (estimates vary) while drawing 64% of TVs turned on at the time. To date, "One for the Road" remains the most watched American TV series finale following the rise of cable television, and in terms of sheer viewership numbers for non-sports programming, sits second only to the aforementioned finale of M*A*S*H.

With only slightly fewer viewers than the series finale of Cheers was the finale of its one-time follow-up on NBC's "Must See TV" Thursday night line-up, the absurdist NBC comedy Seinfeld. The third most-watched American TV series finale in television history, Seinfeld's controversial 1998 episode "The Finale" was watched by 76.3 million people, drawing 67% of all televisions turned on at the time – as The New York Times put it, "grazing Super Bowl country" in terms of viewership.

With the shift away from network television viewing toward cable television viewing (and later, internet use) that occurred during the decade between the finales of M*A*S*H (1983) and Cheers (1993) – and continued unabated until and beyond the finale of Seinfeld (1998) – it remains debatable which of these three "event" series finales accomplished the most impressive viewership numbers. Moreover, a large gap in viewership numbers exists between the Super Bowl-sized audiences of the M*A*S*H, Cheers and Seinfeld finales, and the fourth and fifth most watched series finales in television history – respectively, those of the comedy Friends (2004, NBC, 52.5 million viewers) and the detective procedural Magnum, P.I. (1988, CBS, 50.7 million viewers). The Friends finale's ("The Last One") viewership numbers dwarf those of all finales since the start of the new millennium and seem particularly impressive in light of the increased media options since the 1990s "event" finales of Cheers (1993) and Seinfeld (1998).

In Britain, the most-acclaimed series finale of sitcoms was from Blackadder. In 1989, the Britcom, starring Rowan Atkinson as a Blackadder in 1917 WW1, goes "over the top" with his regiment, leaving their fate unknown as fade to a field of poppies. The finale was praised as a "perfect end-of-show finale".

=== Reception ===
No matter how critically lauded during their respective runs, relatively few popular television series end up pleasing critics and audiences universally or escaping controversy with their final episode. Prominent examples of controversial series finales include the comedies Roseanne ("Into That Good Night", 1997), Seinfeld ("The Finale", 1998), How I Met Your Mother ("Last Forever", 2014), and Two and a Half Men ("Of Course He's Dead", 2015), and the dramas The Prisoner ("Fall Out", 1968), Lost ("The End", 2010), Dexter ("Remember the Monsters?", 2013), True Blood ("Thank You", 2014), and Game of Thrones ("The Iron Throne", 2019). In particular, the finales of Dexter, How I Met Your Mother, and Game of Thrones triggered massive backlash from both fans and critics upon airing, and are often regarded as the worst finales in recent memory.

Some series endings have proved divisive among viewers immediately on airing, leading to extensive discussions online, but ended up being generally lauded by critics. Notable examples of this trend are the finales of The Sopranos ("Made in America", 2007) and The Wire ("-30-", 2008). For example, The Sopranos' finale caused millions of viewers to temporarily believe they had lost cable service due to an abrupt blackout. These episodes were also nominated for multiple Primetime Emmy Awards, including Outstanding Writing, with The Sopranos' finale winning.

Several television series have, however, managed to produce final episodes that lived up to both critics' and audiences' expectations. Examples include the twist endings that concluded both Newhart and St. Elsewhere, the mixture of comedy and resonance that wrapped up The Mary Tyler Moore Show, Friends, Everybody Loves Raymond, and Brooklyn Nine-Nine, and the redemption arc that concluded The Fugitive.

Several more series finales have received unanimous critical and popular acclaim and are often considered as benchmarks for great TV endings. Recent examples include the finales of Breaking Bad ("Felina", 2013), Community ("Emotional Consequences of Broadcast Television", 2015), The Good Place ("Whenever You're Ready", 2020), Better Call Saul ("Saul Gone", 2022), Atlanta ("It Was All a Dream", 2022), and Succession ("With Open Eyes", 2023).

Examples of universally acclaimed finales from earlier in the millennium include those of Britain's The Office ("Interview", 2002), The Shield ("Family Meeting", 2008), and Six Feet Under ("Everyone's Waiting", 2005), the last of which TV Guide ranked at No. 22 on their list of "TV's Top 100 Episodes of All Time".

== Plot devices ==
Television series finales frequently feature fundamental deviations from the central plotline, such as the resolution of a central mystery or problem (e.g. Dallas, Two and a Half Men, Full House), the separation or return of a major character (e.g. Cheers, That '70s Show, The Office) or an event signifying the end of an era, such as a change to primary setting for the series (e.g. The Mary Tyler Moore Show, Boy Meets World, Martin, Liv and Maddie).

Series finales will sometimes include clips or characters from the series' past (e.g. Seinfeld, Suits, Martin, Star Trek: The Next Generation), and the ending moments of the episode often take place in the show's primary setting.

== Premature series finales ==
In some cases, a TV series finale proves premature, as was the case with Here's Lucy, 7th Heaven, Charmed, Babylon 5, and Arrested Development to name but a few. Some shows that have constantly been in danger of cancellation wrote every season finale with the idea that the episode would serve as a quality series finale if the network decided not to bring it back; in recent years from NBC's Thursday night comedy lineup, Parks and Recreation used this formula for the season finales for Seasons 3–6, before getting a renewal for a seventh and final season where the series finale was planned in advance, and Community wrote its fifth-season finale with the notion that whether the show found new life elsewhere or not, it would definitely not be returning to the network (while NBC did indeed cancel the show, it was renewed for a sixth season by Yahoo Screen, where the season and sure enough, series finale was once again scripted as a potential last episode ever; the final image is that of text reading "#andamovie", a reference to the show's recurring catchphrase "six seasons and a movie"). The series finale of Dr. Ken, a fictionalized sitcom based on the life of doctor-turned-actor Ken Jeong, features the title character trying out for a fictional version of Community; Jeong was a cast member.

The medical comedy Scrubs aired its two-part finale episode, "My Finale", in May 2009 as the show's renewal or cancellation had not been decided as of its airing, and so it was not known whether the episode would conclude just the season or the entire series; Scrubs would eventually be renewed for one additional season, which became a de facto spin-off series titled Scrubs: Med School.

The cartoon Futurama has had four designated series finales, due to the recurringly uncertain future of the series. "The Devil's Hands Are Idle Playthings", "Into the Wild Green Yonder (Part 4)", "Overclockwise", and "Meanwhile" have all been written to serve as a final episode for the show.

The series American Dad! had two possible finales: the season premiere of the eighth season, "Hot Water" was written due to the uncertainty from the staff of the show getting picked up. The penultimate episode of Season 19 was also intended as a series finale, as revealed by showrunner and executive producer Matt Weitzman.

Before the original run of Power Rangers ended in 2023, the show featured four episodes that were written as series finales. In the first season of Mighty Morphin Power Rangers, the two-part episode "Doomsday" was originally written as the show's final episode, but the show had its first season order extended and later received two additional seasons due to its increasing popularity. "Countdown to Destruction", the two-part finale of Power Rangers in Space, was also intended as a series finale as it concluded the story arc that began when the series premiered. The final episode of Power Rangers Wild Force was written as a series finale due to The Walt Disney Company's 2001 acquisition of Saban Entertainment (which resulted in the relocation of production from the show's original home of Southern California to New Zealand), while the final episode of Power Rangers RPM was the last episode to be produced by Disney before ownership of the franchise was transferred to Saban Brands in 2010. The franchise's original run would end with Power Rangers Cosmic Fury, which was the final season of the series to be filmed in New Zealand.

The series finale of The Lucy–Desi Comedy Hour (itself an epilogue to I Love Lucy) was unintentionally fitting: stars Lucille Ball and Desi Arnaz were about to divorce and end the show, a fact that the show's guest star for what would be the final program, Edie Adams, did not know when she chose the song she would sing on the program. Prophetically, the song was named "That's All". The series also ended with Lucy and Ricky making up and kissing, while in reality Ball and Arnaz would not (the two would eventually reconcile later in life, although both would go on to marry other people). The last produced half-hour episode was titled "The Ricardos Dedicate a Statue" which included real-life kids Lucie Arnaz and Desi Arnaz Jr. in the final scene where Ricky unveils what he thinks is a Revolutionary War statue only to find out that it is Lucy.

The aforementioned Magnum, P.I. had a premature series finale, as well. At the end of the seventh season, protagonist Thomas Magnum was to be killed off, which was intended to end the series. The final episode of the season, "Limbo", after seeing Magnum wander around as a ghost for nearly the entire run-time, closes with him appearing to walk off into heaven. Following outcry from fans, however, who demanded a more satisfactory conclusion, an eighth, final season was produced, to bring Magnum "back to life", and to round the series off. The mystery of whether Higgins was Robin Masters, or not, was a highly anticipated series finale reveal. The mystery still has yet to be revealed. A number of other episodes also make reference to supernatural occurrences and the seeming existence of ghosts.

The Showtime series Californication was designed from start to make any season finale work as a series finale, in case of early cancelling the show. It is seen most primarily at the end of the first and fourth season.

After its fifth season, the sitcom Reba was in danger of being cancelled as a result of its original home, The WB, being replaced by The CW in September 2006, and the resulting uncertainty over which WB series (as well as which series from CW co-predecessor UPN) would be carried over to the new network. Reba would be renewed by The CW for an additional season as one of the holdover WB series. The sixth (and final) season's finale episode was written to serve as a series finale, in which Brock and Barbara-Jean come to a reconciliation and Van and Cheyenne move back in with Reba, bringing the show to a full wrap.

A series finale may not be the last aired episode of a show, such as King of the Hill, which produced "To Sirloin with Love" as its series finale, though four more episodes produced before it were aired after in syndication.

Another instance of premature endings was with the Rural Purge of 1971 where networks (notably CBS) axed still-popular TV series in an effort to move to more sophisticated programming. Shows were The Beverly Hillbillies, Mayberry R.F.D., Petticoat Junction and Green Acres.

== Finales launching spin-offs ==
Series finales are sometimes used as a backdoor pilot to launch spin-off series. Two well-known examples include The Andy Griffith Show's series finale, which launched the spin-off Mayberry R.F.D. and The Practice's series finale, and much of its final season was used as a launching pad for Boston Legal, starring James Spader and William Shatner. The Golden Girls series finale was set up to lead into a new series with most of the remaining cast, The Golden Palace, Three's Company transitioned more or less seamlessly into Three's a Crowd, the Henry Danger finale served as a pilot to Danger Force while The Fosters series finale acted as an introduction to its spin-off series Good Trouble. The Closer was spun off into a new series, Major Crimes the same night that the original ended, after star Kyra Sedgwick chose, as producer, to end the series.

The Steven Universe finale "Change Your Mind" served as not just a conclusion to the original series and its overarching plot, but helped pave the way for Steven Universe: The Movie, and eventually the limited epilogue series Steven Universe Future.

Some planned spin-offs that influenced series finales, however, never materialized, as in the case of the proposed Laverne & Shirley spin-off for Carmine that never came into fruition, or Posse Impossible, a proposed spin-off of Hong Kong Phooey that, instead of getting its own show, aired as an interstitial segment on CB Bears. Arrow used its penultimate episode of its final season, "Green Arrow & The Canaries", as a backdoor pilot for a potential spin-off series based on the characters Mia Smoak, Laurel Lance and Dinah Drake, but that series was ultimately not picked up.

== See also ==
- Television pilot
- Series premiere
- Season premiere
- Season finale
- Most-watched American series finales
