= Lrrreconcilable Ndndifferences =

- Futurama episode
- Episode no.: Season 6 Episode 11
- Directed by: Crystal Chesney-Thompson
- Written by: Patric M. Verrone
- Production code: 6ACV11
- Original air date: August 26, 2010

Guest appearances
- Katee Sackhoff as Grrrl; Matt Groening as himself; David X. Cohen as himself; Sergio Aragonés as himself

Episode features
- Opening caption: Two scoops of pixels in every scene

Episode chronology
← Previous "The Prisoner of Benda"	Next → "The Mutants Are Revolting"
- Futurama season 6

"Lrrreconcilable Ndndifferences" is the eleventh episode in the sixth season of the American animated television series Futurama, and the 99th episode overall. It aired on Comedy Central on August 26, 2010. In the episode, the Omicronian ruler of the planet Omicron Persei 8, Lrrr, experiences marriage trouble with his queen, Ndnd. He departs for Earth, invading it in an attempt to overcome his mid-life crisis and reignite his marriage.

The episode was written by Patric M. Verrone and directed by Crystal Chesney-Thompson and guest stars Battlestar Galactica's Katee Sackhoff and cartoonist Sergio Aragonés. Series creators and producers Matt Groening and David X. Cohen make cameos in the episode.

== Plot ==
On his birthday, Omicronian King Lrrr's lack of motivation to conquer other worlds leads to Queen Ndnd becoming fed up with it. He then reluctantly invades Earth; however, he arrives during Comic-Con and is mistaken for a costume contest participant and leaves dejected. Concurrently, Fry attempts to author a superhero comic book featuring himself as the superhero saving a captured Leela from a malevolent alien. The crew is unimpressed with the comic, with the exception of the back page of novelty toy advertisements, including the Professor's disintegration guns, which are actually only teleportation guns. Leela's criticism leaves Fry to figure out how to make the story more compelling.

Back on Omicron Persei 8, Ndnd learns of Lrrr's failure and kicks him out of their home. Lrrr returns to Earth, seeking shelter at the Planet Express building. The crew diagnoses Lrrr and his marriage problems as symptomatic of a mid-life crisis. Leela encourages Lrrr to recommit himself to his marriage with Ndnd, but he listens instead to Bender and gets plastic surgery, flashy new clothes, and goes out to a club to meet new women. There he meets an attractive female Omicronian named Grrrl. While on a date with her, she reveals that she is actually a human woman from the Comic-Con wearing an Omicronian costume. Though she is very attracted to real Omicronians, Lrrr rejects her and seeks Leela's advice on how to win back Ndnd.

Leela and the crew help Lrrr stage an invasion of Earth using a fake broadcast with the help of the head of Orson Welles à la the 1938 The War of the Worlds radio broadcast. Ndnd is fooled, but so are the Earthican army, who surrender Earth immediately to Lrrr. Leela scolds Lrrr, demanding that he end the charade and tell Ndnd the truth, but he hesitates due to Ndnd's renewed romantic interest and forces the citizens of Earth into slavery. While enslaved, Leela constantly nags Lrrr about telling Ndnd the truth, which causes Ndnd suspicion about their relationship. She confronts Lrrr, demanding to know if he is having an affair. Grrrl reappears, announcing that she loves Lrrr and will fight for him, brandishing a disintegration ray. Ndnd quickly takes the weapon and shoots Grrrl. Ndnd reveals that she is not upset that Lrrr may have been minutely romantically involved with Grrrl, but that Lrrr allowed Leela to nag him, which Ndnd feels is her role as his wife. Lrrr is reluctantly forced to prove his love for Ndnd by shooting Leela, whom he values as a friend, with the disintegration ray.

As he fires, Fry leaps in front of Leela, sacrificing his life. Ndnd is moved by Lrrr's demonstration of love and the two happily depart back to Omicron Persei 8. Leela is devastated by Fry's sacrifice. However, as the Omicronians depart, Grrrl reappears, shocking the crew. She reveals that the disintegration gun is merely one of the Professor's novelty teleportation guns that she purchased from an advertisement in the back of a comic book. Realizing that Fry is alive, the crew find him back at Planet Express, putting the finishing touches on his comic. Inspired by his own heroic actions, his super hero counterpart attempts to rescue "Leela" from the malevolent alien by leaping in front of its ray gun. Leela is pleased with the new ending and commends the comic book, giving Fry a kiss on the cheek.

== Production ==
This episode features a variety of guest stars including Katee Sackhoff as Grrrl, "the future's equivalent of a furry", and Sergio Aragonés, Matt Groening, and David X. Cohen as themselves.

Bongo Comics published a tie-in comic book, Delivery Boy-Man, as a free give-away at Comic-Con 2010. The comic is drawn in the same crude style depicted in the episode and features a fake letters page with fan mail from Bender.

== Cultural references ==
The episode makes various cultural references and self-references. The episode title is a play on the title of the film Irreconcilable Differences.

One scene takes place at annual comic book convention Comic-Con, featuring a panel with cameos by series creator Matt Groening, co-producer and head writer David X. Cohen, and episode director Crystal Chesney-Thompson—along with visual references to other Futurama cast and crew, including the episode's writer, Patric M. Verrone, producer Claudia Katz, supervising director Peter Avanzino, and executive producer Ken Keeler—premiering a futuristic animated program named "Futurella" while attempting to dodge questions about Groening's other successful animated series, The Simpsons. Bender also asks if there will be a second Simpsons movie, to which Groening responds by shooting him with a laser gun. The episode also references the series' former television broadcasting company, Fox, and its cancellation policies.

Other cultural references include Orson Welles and his famous 1938 radio broadcast of The War of the Worlds. The episode makes a brief reference to U.S. President Richard Nixon with the phrase "Peace with honor", which was a phrase President Nixon used to describe the Paris Peace Accord to end the Vietnam War in a speech on January 23, 1973.

== Broadcast and reception ==
"Lrrreconcilable Ndndifferences" premiered on Comedy Central on August 26, 2010. In its original American broadcast, it had an estimated 1.981 million viewers, up more than 200,000 than the previous week's episode, "The Prisoner of Benda". It also received a 1.1/2% Nielsen rating and a 1.1/3% rating in the 18–49 demographic, up three tenths of a point, matching the season high, not including premiere week.

Merrill Barr of Film School Rejects gave the episode a positive review, stating, "Like some other episodes this season, everything worked. There wasn't a single joke that fell flat, and I'm glad to see Futurama running at 100% capacity." Sean Gandert of Paste gave the episode a mixed review with an overall rating of 7.2. Gandert notes that after the recent run of excellent episodes his expectations made this episode a letdown. Zack Handlen of The A.V. Club gave the episode a B+, noting that he would prefer an episode which "pushes itself a little harder". Handlen and Gandert both note that the main plot of the episode has been done many times on previous sitcoms. However, where Gandert finds that the use of Lrrr and Ndnd drags the episode down, Handlen praises the fact that Lrrr is getting more screen time. Both reviewers also praise LaMarche's Orson Welles impersonation, which led to a 2011 Emmy Award for Outstanding Voice-Over Performance.

Patric Verrone was nominated for a Writers Guild of America Award for Outstanding Writing in Animation at the 63rd Writers Guild of America Awards for his script to this episode.
