= The Futurama Holiday Spectacular =

- Futurama episode
- Episode no.: Season 6 Episode 13
- Directed by: Ray Claffey
- Written by: Michael Rowe
- Production code: 6ACV13
- Original air date: November 21, 2010

Guest appearances
- Coolio as Kwanzaabot; Al Gore as himself; Dan Vebber as Norwegian Seed Guard

Episode features
- Opening caption: Time Travelers: Only 331 Shopping Days 'til last Xmas

Episode chronology
← Previous "The Mutants Are Revolting"	Next → "The Silence of the Clamps"
- Futurama season 6

"The Futurama Holiday Spectacular", originally titled "Holiday Val-U-Pak", is the thirteenth episode in the sixth season of the American animated television series Futurama, and the 101st episode of the series overall. It originally aired as a holiday special on November 21, 2010, before the remaining episodes of Season 6 were broadcast in 2011. The episode features three self-contained segments, sponsored by the fictitious product "Gunderson's Unshelled Nuts". The first segment is based on "Xmas" (pronounced as "eks-mas"; a version of Christmas present in the 31st century), in which the long-extinct pine tree species is revived, but due to seed contamination grows out of control. The second segment is based on "Robanukah" (a holiday based on Hanukkah, made up by Bender to avoid work), in which Bender leads the crew on a search for petroleum oil in order for him to celebrate the holiday. In the third and final segment, the Planet Express crew go in search of beeswax, in order to create traditional beeswax candles for Kwanzaa.

Each segment features recurring elements, including an environmental theme, a song, and ending in which most or all of the main characters either die or face certain death. Al Gore reprises his role as his own head in a jar in all three segments. Coolio reprises his role as Kwanzaabot in the third segment. Series producer David X. Cohen has compared the episode to The Simpsons "Treehouse of Horror" series.

== Plot ==
=== Xmas ===
The gang are at a ski resort with fir trees which reminds Fry of Christmas, before the central plot proceeds. Robot Santa attacks the Planet Express building on Xmas Eve, explaining in song how the holiday should be celebrated. The crew are inspired to revive the pine tree, which became extinct in the 2200s, with seeds from the Svalbard Global Seed Vault. However, the seeds have been contaminated by a biological weapons repository neighboring the vault, causing pine trees to grow and spread at a rapid rate until they cover the entire Earth. Though the trees seem beneficial at first, returning the planet to a lush, wildlife-filled state, their uncontrolled growth produces dangerously high levels of oxygen in the atmosphere. When Bender lights a celebratory cigar, the sparks ignite the air and burn the planet to a cinder, killing the entire population.

=== Robanukah ===
Bender criticizes the crew for not celebrating his made-up robot holiday Robanukah from "Fear of a Bot Planet" and sings a song explaining it, detailing a tradition in which fembots must wrestle in petroleum oil for six and a half weeks. He is shocked to discover that they only have enough oil for four and a half weeks of wrestling and forces the crew to drill deep into the Earth with the Planet Express ship. Since all surface reserves of petroleum have been exhausted, the crew tunnels toward the Earth's core; the immense pressure crushes everyone to death except for Bender, who decides to take a nap. He wakes up 500 million years later and finds that the heat and pressure have turned his friends' bodies into petroleum oil. Returning to the now-dilapidated Planet Express building, he is surprised to find the two fembots still wrestling in their original supply of oil and declares it to be a Robanukah miracle.

=== Kwanzaa ===
The crew visit Hermes and his family for Kwanzaa, learning more about the holiday through a song by Kwanzaabot. Hermes' wife LaBarbara learns that she does not have the traditional beeswax candles required for Kwanzaa and sends Hermes to get some. However, the crew discover there is no beeswax in the world due to a colony collapse disorder caused by an infestation of blood-sucking mites. Accompanied by Kwanzaabot, they decide to return to the space beehive (from "The Sting") to collect some wax, but find the colony to be in disarray caused by the same mites. Hermes uses the Kwanzaa tenets to spread goodwill between the space bee drones, restoring harmony and killing the mites. However, the now-united swarm destroys Kwanzaabot and encases the crew members in wax to use as candles for its own Kwanzaa celebration.

=== Finale ===
A curtain descends and Al Gore appears to close the episode. He reminds the viewer that the characters will return in 2011, featuring himself as a major character called Captain Lance Starman. He then wishes the audience a happy holiday season on behalf of Gunderson's Unshelled Nuts as Amy dances in a costume advertising the product.

== Production ==
The episode features three stand-alone, environmentally and holiday-themed, musical segments, following the same structure as the episodes "Anthology of Interest I" and "Anthology of Interest II". However, unlike those episodes, it does not feature the "What If Machine". The episodes are not part of the series continuity. The three segments are based around the three winter holidays from previous Futurama episodes: Xmas, Kwanzaa and Robanukah (the holiday Bender made up to get out of work in "Fear of a Bot Planet"). Coolio reprised his guest-starring role of Kwanzaa-bot in the Kwanzaa segment. Al Gore also makes appearances as himself in the Xmas and Robanukah segments as well as the wrap-around segment closing out the episode.

== Reception ==
In its original American broadcast, the episode was viewed by an estimated 1.302 million households.

Robert Canning of IGN gave the episode a 9.0 citing it was worth watching. He explained that the weakest segment of the show was when Robot Santa made an appearance to help sing about the traditions of the holiday, but praised the two ending segments of the show.
