= A Clockwork Origin =

- Futurama episode
- Episode no.: Season 7 Episode 9
- Directed by: Dwayne Carey-Hill
- Written by: Dan Vebber
- Production code: 6ACV09
- Original air date: August 12, 2010

Episode features
- Opening caption: This time, it's personal

Episode chronology
← Previous "That Darn Katz!"	Next → "The Prisoner of Benda"
- Futurama season 7

"A Clockwork Origin" is the ninth episode in the sixth season of the American animated television series Futurama, and the 97th episode of the series overall. It aired on Comedy Central on August 12, 2010. In the episode, Professor Farnsworth leaves Earth after being frustrated by anti-evolutionists' belief in "Creaturism", a form of Creationism. He and the Planet Express crew arrive at a lifeless planet and the Professor introduces nanobots into the environment. The nanobots rapidly begin evolving into mechanical organisms, allowing the crew to witness a whole new evolutionary history that unfolds before their eyes.

The episode was written by Dan Vebber and directed by Dwayne Carey-Hill and received mostly mixed reviews from critics.

== Plot ==
Professor Farnsworth finds himself arguing with Dr. Banjo, a hyper-intelligent orangutan who believes in "Creaturism", a form of creationism. In an attempt to prove evolution did occur, the Professor excavates the lost missing link, which Banjo depicts as Homo farnsworth anachronistically riding a Stegosaurus in an attempt to support his Creaturist beliefs. A fed up Farnsworth resolves to leave Earth and takes the rest of the crew with him to an abandoned planet to live in solitude.

After Farnsworth inserts nanobots into the nearby pond to clean the water, the nanobots evolve rapidly into flora and fauna. Robotic versions of an Elasmosaurus and a Tyrannosaurus rex attack the crew, but a solar flare short circuits the dinosaur robots, causing a mass extinction of every robot creature except for "small mammalian robots" that were hiding in caves, including Bender.

The next day, the crew wakes up to find both Leela and Amy kidnapped by caveman-like robots, but the following day, they find that Leela and Amy are free, because the robot cavemen have since evolved into a completely civilized, modern robot society. Farnsworth states that he is proud of the nanobots' growth after he dumped their ancestors in a pond a few days ago. The robots, who believe unquestioningly in robot evolution, are angered by Farnsworth, when he shows a picture of a robot (Bender) riding a robotic Stegosaurus at the start of their creation. Farnsworth is subsequently arrested for "crimes against science". Bender represents him in court and in his arguments, states that Farnsworth is not arguing against evolution, but only claims a small role in beginning it by providing the materials necessary (i.e., the nanobots).

The following day, the robots have now evolved into incorporeal energy beings of transcendent higher consciousness that are no longer concerned with corporeal beings including Farnsworth, and send the crew home. Farnsworth and Banjo reconcile their differences. Banjo argues that what Farnsworth witnessed was evolution, but evolution set in motion by an intelligent creator. Farnsworth concedes that it is possible, however unlikely that Earth evolution was set in motion the same way.

== Cultural references ==
The title refers to the books A Clockwork Orange and On the Origin of Species. It could also be considered a reference to William Paley's Watchmaker analogy, a teleological argument found in his work Natural Theology. The episode includes several cultural references related to depictions of evolutionary history and the debate between evolution and creationism. The crew's encounters with the robotic dinosaurs and Amy's two-piece cavewoman outfit are parodies of the 1940 fantasy film, One Million B.C. The trial held in the episode also parodies the Scopes Monkey Trial. During the anti-evolution rally, a Flying Spaghetti Monster—a satirical symbol —appears, arguing against evolution. While excavating for missing links, the Professor finds the skulls of Java Man, Piltdown Man, and musician Manfred Mann, respectively.

== Broadcast and reception ==
"A Clockwork Origin" originally aired August 12, 2010 on Comedy Central. In its original American broadcast, "A Clockwork Origin" was viewed by an estimated 1.926 million viewers with a 1.3 rating/2% share in the Nielsen ratings and a 1.0 rating/3% share in the 18-49 demographic, nearly identical to the previous week's episode, "The Late Philip J. Fry".

The episode received mixed to positive reviews from critics. Merrill Barr of Film School Rejects gave the episode a mixed review, calling it "[a] 50/50 episode of Futurama." He stated, "There were parts I loved, and parts I hated. That is all." He also criticized the Zoidberg and Cubert subplot saying, "while on his own Cubert is a funny character, paring [sic] him with a character like Zoidberg is a bad idea." Zack Handlen of The A.V. Club gave the episode a B+, saying, "It mostly worked, but I was mildly disappointed by the end, because I keep waiting for the episode to move from good to great." Sean Gandert of Paste gave the episode a score of 7.9/10, writing "'A Clockwork Origin' was still a good, fun episode, but was a more disposable piece of entertainment than the show can be at its absolute best."

Robert Canning of IGN gave the episode a strong, positive review, rating it a 9.0/10. Canning praised the episode's pacing as the season's best describing "A Clockwork Origin" as "a very funny, very solid episode." Danny Gallagher of TV Squad gave the episode a positive review as well, saying "It's far from the best episode of the season, but that's still saying a lot for a show that has managed to find new ways to stay fresh while it's been in the can for so long." He also called the robot dinosaur world a perfect parody of One Million B.C..

== See also ==
- Ascension
- Grey goo
- Technological singularity
