= The Tip of the Zoidberg =

- Futurama episode
- Episode no.: Season 6 Episode 18
- Directed by: Raymie Muzquiz
- Written by: Ken Keeler
- Production code: 6ACV18
- Original air date: August 18, 2011

Episode features
- Opening caption: It's Tentacular!

Episode chronology
← Previous "Benderama"	Next → "Ghost in the Machines"
- Futurama season 6

"The Tip of the Zoidberg" is the eighteenth episode in the sixth season of the American animated television series Futurama, and the 106th episode of the series overall. It originally aired on Comedy Central in the United States on August 18, 2011. A pivotal episode, it reveals Dr. Zoidberg's backstory. This episode was nominated for the 2012 Primetime Emmy Award for Outstanding Animated Program (for Programming Less Than One Hour).

== Plot ==
Frustrated with Zoidberg's incompetence as a doctor, the Planet Express crew demand Professor Farnsworth fire him. The Professor refuses, and the crew question why Zoidberg was ever employed in the first place. A series of flashbacks reveal that Zoidberg first met and befriended Farnsworth in 2927, during a mission to kill a Tritonian yeti for Mom. During the mission, Zoidberg is attacked by a yeti, but is saved by Farnsworth, who is scratched by the yeti. Farnsworth now fears that he has contracted hyper-malaria, a painful, fatal, incurable disease which can either strike instantly or remain dormant for years. He asks Zoidberg to perform a mercy killing if he ever exhibits symptoms of the disease. Grateful for the Professor having saved his life and killing the yeti, Zoidberg agrees. As a result, Zoidberg is employed by the Professor for the purpose of carrying out the task.

In the present, the Professor begins to experience what he believes are the symptoms of hyper-malaria, and informs Zoidberg that the time has come to fulfill his promise, but insists that Zoidberg must kill him by surprise because he is afraid to die. The crew, not aware of the agreement, are shocked when they walk in on Zoidberg attempting to murder the Professor, restrain him with the Professor's lab coat and imprison him. Zoidberg notices a single white hair on the Professor's coat and deduces that he does not have hyper-malaria, but rather yetiism, which he had contracted after having been scratched by the Tritonian yeti. The disease mimics the symptoms of hyper-malaria, but instead of illness or death, its victim transforms into a yeti.

Zoidberg escapes and goes to Mom (whom he knows informally as "Carol") to acquire the yeti's head so that he may use its pineal gland as an antidote. Mom, who has great respect and admiration for Zoidberg, says that he is "the best in the business" when it comes to alien anatomy and asks him why he stayed with the Professor all these years instead of opening his own research lab and becoming very wealthy. He replies that the Professor is his friend, indicating that he is poor because he values others more than money. Zoidberg is unable to pay for the yeti head, but Mom accepts payment with the only thing he has – a coupon for a free tanning session. Meanwhile, the Professor reveals the truth to the crew about his arrangement with Zoidberg. Feeling guilty for their previous treatment of Zoidberg they agree to kill the Professor themselves, using an elaborate, Rube Goldberg style killing machine. Soon after starting the machine Zoidberg returns to announce his discovery to the crew just as the Professor begins transforming into a yeti. Zoidberg forces him to swallow the yeti gland, successfully curing him. As the crew goes to a tanning salon to celebrate, Zoidberg laments giving away his coupon. A grateful Farnsworth goes back and offers to treat Zoidberg to a free session, and they both depart as friends.

== Awards and nominations ==
- 2012 Nominated: Emmy Award for Outstanding Animated Program (for Programming Less Than One Hour)
