= Alex Johns =

American film producer (1966–2010)

- Born: August 23, 1966; Roseville, California
- Died: August 7, 2010 (aged 43); Los Angeles, California
- Occupation: Producer
- Notable credits: Futurama; The Ant Bully
- Relatives: Steve Cochran (grandfather)

Alex Johns (August 23, 1966 – August 7, 2010) was an American film and television producer. Johns is best known for his work as the co-producer of more than seventy episodes of the animated television series Futurama. He was also the co-executive producer of the 2006 animated comedy film The Ant Bully.

== Early life ==
Johns was born in Roseville, California, on August 23, 1966, the son of Xandria Walker and Wendell Johns (who predeceased him). Johns was one of five brothers, along with Michael, Christopher and Daniel Johns, and David Cimino. He was the grandson of actor Steve Cochran (1917–1965). Johns graduated from Escalon High School in Escalon, California, in 1984. He attended both San Diego State University and the University of California, San Diego.

== Career ==
Johns began his career in the film industry by colorizing classic black-and-white movies in the late 1980s. Johns was successful in this work despite the fact that he was colorblind, which he kept a professional secret. He began working in television in the 1990s on the series, The Ren & Stimpy Show.

Matt Groening, the creator of Futurama, hired Johns to work on the show. Johns would eventually co-produce more than seventy episodes of Futurama during his career. Groening also gave Johns a prominent production role on the 1999 Christmas television special, Olive, the Other Reindeer, which starred Drew Barrymore and Ed Asner.

Director John A. Davis hired Johns to co-executive produce the 2006 animated film, The Ant Bully. In a professional twist, Johns had actually fired Davis from the production staff of Olive, the Other Reindeer in the late 1990s due to tactical and budgetary reasons. Davis spoke of the unusual situation in an interview in 2010 explaining, "Alex was in the uncomfortable position of telling me I was being replaced, but to hear his spin, it sounded like I was getting a promotion! He was awesome...He did such a great job firing me, I had to hire him! [for The Ant Bully]." The film went on to gross more than $28 million at the U.S. domestic box office.

== Death ==
Johns died on August 7, 2010, at Cedars-Sinai Medical Center in Los Angeles after a long-term illness at the age of 43. The 100th episode of Futurama, "The Mutants Are Revolting", was dedicated to his memory.
