= Neutopia (Futurama) =

- Futurama episode
- Episode no.: Season 6 Episode 20
- Directed by: Edmund Fong
- Written by: J. Stewart Burns
- Production code: 6ACV20
- Original air date: June 23, 2011

Episode features
- Opening caption: Provides a full day's supply of Vitamin F!

Episode chronology
← Previous "Ghost in the Machines"	Next → "Yo Leela Leela"
- Futurama season 6

"Neutopia" is the twentieth episode in the sixth season of the American animated television series Futurama, and the 108th episode of the series overall. It aired on Comedy Central in the United States on June 23, 2011.

== Plot ==
Planet Express faces foreclosure and to raise money, Professor Farnsworth, Fry, Bender, Zoidberg, Hermes and Scruffy take advantage of a contract clause to force Leela, Amy, and LaBarbara (who was recently hired) to pose for a pin-up calendar. This plan does not work out, so the company converts into a private airline. During its maiden voyage the plane runs out of fuel and crashes on a planet made entirely of minerals with rivers of mercury.

Tensions begin to arise between the males and females, and each gender forms a group. A sentient rock alien appears and is fascinated by everyone's genders, as it is unfamiliar with the concept. The alien tests the two groups on gender superiority, challenging them to reach a glacier cave before the planet reaches perihelion, boiling the mercury. Both groups realize they can create a cooler from Bender's gas compressor, and the freon coil of a refrigerator fembot named Amana. Hermes and LaBarbara each steal a part from the other group, but are caught by each other. During an argument they end up having sex, and fail to create a cooler in time. The rock alien teleports everyone to the safety of the cave, and expresses its disappointment that both groups failed to cooperate with each other. In an attempt to resolve their differences, the alien uses its powers to neuter everyone.

Without the tension caused by genders, the castaways get along and work together to repair the crashed ship. However, Hermes and LaBarbara begin to miss the feeling of physical intimacy and demand the alien to restore their genders. The alien attempts to do so, but inadvertently switches their genders. Before the alien can fix its mistake, it is vaporized by Zapp Brannigan. Back at Planet Express, Leela, Amy and LaBarbara don't like being men while Fry, Bender, Farnsworth, Hermes, Zoidberg and Scruffy love being women—as their company is still facing foreclosure, the women-turned-men take advantage of the contract clause to force the men-turned-women to pose for the calendar. They manage to sell enough calendars to save Planet Express and while celebrating, the rock alien's friend, the Borax Kid, arrives and restores everyone to their correct genders before leaving. Scruffy emerges from a bathroom, still female, having missed the Borax Kid's visit.

== Production ==
In earlier drafts of the script, the episode did not feature the characters switching to their opposite genders at all, nor the character of the Borax Kid. An original ending involved Amy's parents, Leo and Inez Wong, purchasing Planet Express and saving it from foreclosure.
