= Dwayne Carey-Hill =

American animation director

Dwayne Carey-Hill is an American animation director who is currently Supervising Director of the Netflix series, Disenchantment. Prior to Disenchantment, he was a director on Futurama, Comedy Central series Drawn Together, Trumpy's Rhapsody, Tarantula, Clash-O-Rama!, and Coffin Dodgers. He also worked for Sit Down, Shut Up, an animated remake of the 2003 Australian show of the same name. He was director on the animated TV series of Napoleon Dynamite. Additionally, he directed Futurama: Bender's Big Score and Futurama: Bender's Game.

== Directing credits ==
=== Supervising Director ===
- Full English
- Disenchantment (with Peter Avanzino)
- Futurama (season 10, with Peter Avanzino)

=== Director ===
==== Disenchantment ====
- "Bean Falls Apart"
- "The Goo-Bye Girl"
- "Spy Vs. Spy Vs. Spy"
- "The Unbearable Lightning of Bean"
- "What to Expect When You're Expecting Parasites"
- "The Pitter-Patter of Little Feet"
- "Goon Baby Goon"
- "The Cabinet of Dr. Chazzzzz"
- "The Good, The Bad, and the Bum-Bum"
- "Love Is Hell"
- "Bad Moon Rising"
- "Stairway to Hell"
- "A Princess, an Elf, and a Demon Walk Into a Bar"

==== Tarantula ====
- "Pajattery"
- "Seesaw"

==== Clash-a-Rama! ====
- "Goblin's Eleven"
- "12 Days of Clashmas"
- "Hog Rider Rides Again"
- "Giant vs. Giant Problem"

==== Full English ====
- "Edgar, Interrupted"
- "Britain's Got Bloodmonkey"

==== Futurama ====
- "Obsoletely Fabulous"
- "Bender's Big Score" (DVD movie)
- "Bender's Game" (DVD movie)
- "In-A-Gadda-Da-Leela"
- "A Clockwork Origin"
- "Mobius Dick"
- "Fry Am the Egg Man"
- "Decision 3012"
- "Scared Screenless"

==== Drawn Together ====
- "Clara's Dirty Little Secret"
- "The One Wherein There Is a Big Twist, Part II"
- "Terms of Endearment"
- "Captain Girl"
- "The Drawn Together Clip Show"
- "Wooldoor Sockbat's Giggle-Wiggle Funny Tickle Non-Traditional Progressive Multicultural Roundtable!"
- "Mexican't Buy Me Love"

==== Napoleon Dynamite ====
- "Thundercone"

==== Sit Down, Shut Up ====
- "High School Confidential"
- "Pilot"
