= All the Presidents' Heads =

- Futurama episode
- Episode no.: Season 6 Episode 23
- Directed by: Stephen Sandoval
- Written by: Josh Weinstein
- Production code: 6ACV23
- Original air date: July 28, 2011

Episode features
- Opening caption: Apply viewing oil now
- Opening cartoon: Zoich (2010)

Episode chronology
← Previous "Fry Am the Egg Man"	Next → "Cold Warriors"
- Futurama season 6

"All the Presidents' Heads" is the twenty-third episode in the sixth season of the American animated television series Futurama, and the 111th episode of the series overall. It originally aired July 28, 2011 on Comedy Central. The episode was written by Josh Weinstein and directed by Stephen Sandoval.

== Plot ==
Fry has a night job at the Head Museum, feeding the preserved heads of the presidents of the United States. He invites the Planet Express crew to the museum, where they ingest the preservative fluid inside the jars. Doing so causes them to temporarily time travel to the eras each head came from. Professor Farnsworth reasons that this is caused by the powdered and crystalline opal used in the fluids' creation. After learning from George Washington's head that one of his ancestors, David Farnsworth, was one of American history's most nefarious traitors during the American Revolutionary War, the professor, determined to salvage his family's reputation, dumps a vial containing the world's powdered opal supply into Washington's jar and licks his head, transporting himself, Fry, Leela and Bender to colonial-era New York in 1775 for the next twenty-four hours.

The quartet learns from the Continental Congress that David Farnsworth works at Benjamin Franklin's print shop in Philadelphia, where David forges counterfeit money that will jeopardize the country's economy should it enter circulation. Though they do not find David, they discover a forged Massachusetts halfpenny and determine he has gone to Paul Revere's silver shop in Boston. They defeat David just as Revere begins his ride to alert Lexington of the British attack that will start the Revolutionary War. However, Fry takes one of the two lanterns hanging at the Old North Church to use for the counterfeit money's disposal, resulting in Revere incorrectly warning of the British attack "by land" rather than "by sea".

The opal's effects dissipate and the quartet are returned to their proper time period, finding that history has been altered – Great Britain won the war and conquered North America, with it now being known as "West Britannia". David assassinated George Washington and was rewarded with dukedom, making the professor a noble landowner and consort of the Queen of England. Having depleted the world's crystalline opal supply, the professor despairs that there is no way to rectify their mistake until he notices the Andamooka Opal in the queen's crown. After stealing the opal, the quartet use David's preserved head on display at the Head Museum to return to the past and restore the timeline, though in place of the Gadsden flag hanging in the museum, a similar flag displays Bender with a colonial spelling of his "Bite my shiny metal ass" catchphrase.

== Cultural references ==
- The opening sequence features Zoich, a proposed Russian XXII Winter Olympics mascot, which itself was inspired by Futurama's Hypnotoad.

== Reception ==
Zack Handlen of The A.V. Club gave the episode a B−.
