= The Devil's Hands Are Idle Playthings =

- Futurama episode
- Episode no.: Season 4 Episode 18
- Directed by: Bret Haaland
- Written by: Ken Keeler
- Production code: 4ACV18
- Original air date: August 10, 2003
- Running time: 23 minutes

Guest appearances
- Dan Castellaneta as The Robot Devil

Episode features
- Opening caption: See you on some other channel
- Opening cartoon: Futurama opening sequence

Episode chronology
← Previous "Spanish Fry"	Next → "Bender's Big Score Part 1"
- Futurama season 4

"The Devil's Hands Are Idle Playthings" is the eighteenth and final episode in the fourth season of the American animated television series Futurama, the 72nd episode of the series overall and the finale of the original run. It originally aired on the Fox network in the United States on August 10, 2003. The episode was written by Ken Keeler and directed by Bret Haaland, as well as guest starring Dan Castellaneta, who reprises his role as the Robot Devil. Keeler was nominated for an Annie Award for this episode, while the song "I Want My Hands Back" was nominated for an Emmy Award.

Set in a retro-futuristic 31st century, the series follows the adventures of the employees of Planet Express, an interplanetary delivery company. In this episode, Fry makes a deal to swap hands with the Robot Devil so he can better play the holophonor, an instrument he believes can help him express his true feelings for Leela. The episode contains several cultural references and it was well received by critics.

At the time, this episode was the series finale, as Fox had not renewed the series for any further seasons. The episode was produced with this in mind and as such, it contains references to the series' ending and almost all of the series' recurring characters were added into the episode. However, the series returned on March 23, 2008, for a fifth season that consisted of a quartet of direct-to-video films. Two more seasons were then produced for Comedy Central before the series ended for a second time on September 4, 2013. The series was revived for a second time on Hulu, with the first episode premiering on July 24, 2023.

== Plot ==
Bender discovers that Fry is attempting to play the holophonor so he can woo Leela. After a disastrous recital, Bender recommends Fry enlist the help of the Robot Devil to improve his holophonor skills. The Robot Devil strikes a deal with Fry to trade hands with any robot in the world. The Robot Devil uses a carnival wheel to select which hands Fry would trade with. It stops on the Robot Devil himself, much to his disbelief and horror. With his new, nimble hands, Fry becomes a skilled holophonor virtuoso. He is commissioned by Hedonismbot to write an opera. Fry, in an attempt to win Leela's heart, bases the opera on her life.

Upset at getting the raw end of the deal, the Robot Devil decides he has to get his own hands back. He begs Fry, but Fry refuses, reminding him they made a deal. The Robot Devil tries to make a deal with Bender for his hands. When Bender refuses, the Robot Devil then makes another deal, in which he trades Bender a stadium air horn for his "crotch-plate" so that he can annoy people. When Bender uses the air horn on Leela, it causes her to go deaf. Leela refuses to tell Fry, afraid that Fry will stop writing the opera, so she attends the premiere pretending she can still hear the performance. During the intermission, the Robot Devil offers Leela robotic ears in exchange for one of her hands at a time of his choosing. Desperate to hear the opera, Leela accepts the offer.

After the opera insults the Robot Devil, he interrupts and demands that Fry give him back his hands. When Fry refuses, the Robot Devil says that he will take Leela's hand in marriage. Fry decides that he has no choice but to trade the Robot Devil's hands back for his own. Because Fry can now no longer play so expertly, the entire audience storms out sans the sympathetic Leela, who requests that he finish as she wants to know how "it" ends. Playing an improvised finale, Fry produces crude, cartoonish images of himself and Leela. To a simplistic yet sweet bansuri tune, the created Fry and Leela kiss and then walk into the distance hand-in-hand.

== Production ==
While this episode may not have been conceived as the final episode of the series, the production crew did include references to the series' likely ending, as the show had not been renewed by the end of production. The episode's opening subtitle was "See You On Some Other Channel", referring to the broadcast syndication that many shows enter after cancellation as this was the last episode at the time of production. Earlier that year, the series began airing on Cartoon Network's Adult Swim block, running until the end of 2007, and was bought by Comedy Central to air in 2008. New episodes started airing in 2010. Because this episode was being produced with the thought that it could be the final episode of the series, there was a concerted effort to include the entire cast of the show, and most of its recurring characters.

Due to the ending of the series and the death of John Ritter, Katey Sagal's co-star on 8 Simple Rules for Dating My Teenage Daughter, there was difficulty on Sagal's part in recording the final line of the episode, in which Leela says to Fry: "I want to hear how it ends". In the audio commentary, it is stated that it took nearly six months to record the line.

== Cultural references ==
According to David X. Cohen, the episode's title comes from the saying "Idle hands are the Devil's playthings". In keeping with the episode's focus on classical music (opera in particular), the plot is loosely based on the story of Faust.

The Holophonor was inspired by the Visi-Sonor, an instrument played by the Mule in Isaac Asimov's Foundation and Empire.

In Robot Hell, the Robot Devil plays an iteration of "The Devil Went Down to Georgia" by The Charlie Daniels Band.

== Broadcast and reception ==
Writer Ken Keeler was nominated for an Emmy Award in 2004 for "Outstanding Music and Lyrics" for the song "I Want My Hands Back" and for an Annie Award for "Music in an Animated Television Production". The episode was ranked number 16 on IGN's list of the top 25 Futurama episodes in 2006. Science Fiction Weekly rated the episode as their "A Pick" for its original airing in 2003, calling the episode a "superbly funny ending to the series". Dan Castellaneta's performance as the Robot Devil in this episode along with the episode "Hell Is Other Robots" has been described as a "bravura appearance". The episode was called an "instant classic" by a reviewer for the Asia Africa Intelligence Wire. In 2013, it was ranked number 2 "as voted on by fans" for Comedy Central's "Futurama Fanarama" marathon.
