= The Duh-Vinci Code =

- Futurama episode
- Episode no.: Season 6 Episode 5
- Directed by: Raymie Muzquiz
- Written by: Maiya Williams
- Production code: 6ACV05
- Original air date: July 15, 2010

Episode features
- Opening caption: Put on 3-D monocle now

Episode chronology
← Previous "Proposition Infinity"	Next → "Lethal Inspection"
- Futurama season 6

"The Duh-Vinci Code" is the fifth episode in the sixth season of the American animated television series Futurama, and the 93rd episode of the series overall. It originally aired on Comedy Central in the United States on July 15, 2010. In the episode, Fry finds a drawing of a lost Leonardo da Vinci invention which leads him and Professor Farnsworth to planet Vinci.

The episode's title and plot is a parody of The Da Vinci Code. It received positive reviews from critics and went up one-tenth in the 18-49 demographic from the previous episode, "Proposition Infinity".

== Plot ==
Fry misses the first question on Who Dares to Be a Millionaire?, and Professor Farnsworth berates him for his stupidity. Farnsworth explains that he is a proud scientist who greatly admires classic geniuses of history, mainly Leonardo da Vinci, and it pains him that one of his relatives (Fry) is such an idiot. Farnsworth shows Fry his most precious possession, Da Vinci's beard. Fry accidentally destroys it, uncovering a secret project of Da Vinci's. After two weeks of fruitless research, Farnsworth orders Bender to steal Da Vinci's original Last Supper, and using an x-ray machine, learns that Saint James was a robot.

The Planet Express crew goes to Rome to find the tomb of Saint James. They discover a robot in the tomb, who suddenly comes back to life and explains to the crew that he is Animatronio, a robot version of the original Saint James created by Leonardo da Vinci. Farnsworth asks Animatronio about Da Vinci's secret project, but Animatronio realizes that if they do not know about the "Machina Magnifica", they must not be a part of Da Vinci's secret society. He carelessly reveals that Da Vinci's secret is in a fountain, and proceeds to self-lash himself and fakes death to deny them any other information. Farnsworth uses clues from a statue of Neptune in the room to deduce that they need to look in the Trevi Fountain.

The crew arrives at Trevi Fountain, and Bender dives in to steal the coins at the bottom. He fights a mutant octopus for the coins and discovers a secret door that leads to a room filled with many of Da Vinci's famous inventions. Animatronio reappears and after an attempt at their lives, carelessly mentions that all the inventions fit together.

Fry triggers one of the inventions, which assembles itself into a spaceship and sends Fry and Farnsworth to the planet Vinci. They find Leonardo da Vinci, who reveals his great secret: He is from the planet Vinci, which is populated by a humanoid, near-immortal, highly intelligent alien race that takes pleasure in education. Farnsworth is elated, and runs off to explore and learn. Fry confesses his stupidity to Leonardo, who sympathizes and says that he is actually the dumbest person on planet Vinci, and lived on Earth during the Renaissance because he could not withstand the continuous bullying from his race. Earth's relatively stupid inhabitants were also intolerable to him, so he eventually returned to Vinci. Leonardo mentions the lost plans for his Machina Magnifica, which Fry happens to be carrying, and Leonardo takes them happily.

Fry helps Leonardo build the Machina Magnifica, under the assumption that they are plans for an ice cream machine. Farnsworth is having difficulty keeping up with the academic rigors on Vinci, and is ridiculed for his relative stupidity. Leonardo eventually reveals that his Machina Magnifica is a doomsday device, and attempts to use it on all those who tormented him. Fry is appalled at the machine's true purpose and tries to sabotage it, only to jam the gears when he falls in among them. The people of Vinci laugh at the failed machine, and Leonardo defiantly pulls a lever and is killed by a giant cog that falls on him. Farnsworth and Fry fly home in Leonardo's ship, and Farnsworth clumsily apologizes to Fry for insulting his intelligence.

== Cultural references ==
The basic plot and title of the episode is a parody of The Da Vinci Code. They also make a reference to Achilles' Heel, Who Wants to Be a Millionaire?, and Leela is seen wearing bunny slippers.

== Reception ==
In its original broadcast on Comedy Central, "The Duh-Vinci Code" was viewed by an estimated 2.204 million viewers (up nearly 200,000 or 10% from "Proposition Infinity") with a 1.5 household rating and a 1.1 rating in the 18-49 demographic, up 1/10 of a point from the previous week and making it the 3rd highest rated episode of the season behind premiere week's doubleheader of "Rebirth" and "In-A-Gadda-Da-Leela".

Robert Canning of IGN gave the episode an 8.0/10 stating in his review "As wary as dated references and repurposed story ideas have been making me feel, it's hard not to enjoy an episode of Futurama that can deliver fun twists and an unexpected Achilles' Heel gag." Zack Handlen of The A.V. Club gave a B and also said in his review "Generally, I like shows that build on emotional relationships, but the rules are different here. Although I'm starting to wonder if a little more cohesion might do the show good".

== See also ==
- Cultural references to Leonardo da Vinci
