= Politics in Futurama =

Art-included criticisms

The animated science fiction show Futurama presents a satirical look at politics and current affairs in a number of its episodes. Series creator Matt Groening intended from the outset that Futurama would lampoon not only the conventions of science fiction, but elements of present-day life, serving as a form of political and social satire.

== Earth government ==
The flag of the Government of Earth.

The most significant change in global politics presented in Futurama's view of the 31st century is that the whole of Earth is governed by a single united government. This united government has many similarities to the present-day United States' political system; its capital is Washington, D.C., it is a two-party system of the "Fingerlican" and "Tastycrat" parties with a number of inconsequential third parties, the government is headed by a president, and there are references to a constitution and an expanded bill of rights. In the episodes "The Day the Earth Stood Stupid" and "A Head in the Polls" third parties mentioned include the "Rainbow Whigs", "Antisocialists", the "Voter Apathy Party", "Reform Party", the "Green Party", "Brain Slug Party", "Dudes for the Legalation of of Hemp" [sic], "Bull Space Moose Party", "National Ray-Gun Association", "People for the Ethical Treatment of Humans", and "One Cell, One Vote".

Citizens of Earth are referred to as "Earthicans". In the episodes "When Aliens Attack" and "Anthology of Interest II" there is evidence that the Countries of Earth are still bound to the U.N. (the UN New York Offices appear in "When Aliens Attack"), headed by the Earth President. Each member appears to remain individual, sending their own representative to the UN and maintaining many of their own cultures and languages, but also show evidence of multiculturalism (France now speaks English and French is apparently a dead language, for example). It is not clear how much power the countries actually have in the Earthican government, though it appears that remnants of many U.S. states, for example, have survived into the 31st century, including "New New York", "New New Jersey", "Nukevada", "Penn Republic" and "Sylvania"; the latter two are a humorous reference to the dissolution of Czechoslovakia in 1992.

"Old Freebie", the name of Earth's flag, contains the thirteen stripes of the Continental Union Flag and the Flag of the United States but instead of the 50 stars or the Union Flag in the canton it has a picture of the globe, with North and South America prominently centered. In the episode "A Taste of Freedom", Doctor Zoidberg eats the flag, causing an interplanetary incident. This reflects several controversies surrounding the desecration of the American flag.

The former U.S. Supreme Court has become the Earth's Supreme Court. According to Richard Nixon's disembodied head, the Earth's Supreme Court is the "one place where the Constitution doesn't mean squat". The current Chief Justice is Snoop Dogg, while the other members of the Supreme Court are several preserved heads in jars of the members of the U.S. Supreme Court during the 1990s—like Scalia, Thomas or Ginsburg—while the other members are singers or actresses such as Björk or Katey Sagal (who voices Leela). Myrtle Fu, a female judge who resembles Judge Judy, was the last non-head-in-jar Justice at the Supreme Court. Abe Vigoda was also a member of the Court. In "Into the Wild Green Yonder", Leela and her environmentalist cohorts are convicted of various crimes because—while all five female justices vote to acquit—each female justice has only half a vote, as the crimes committed were gender-related.

=== Presidency ===
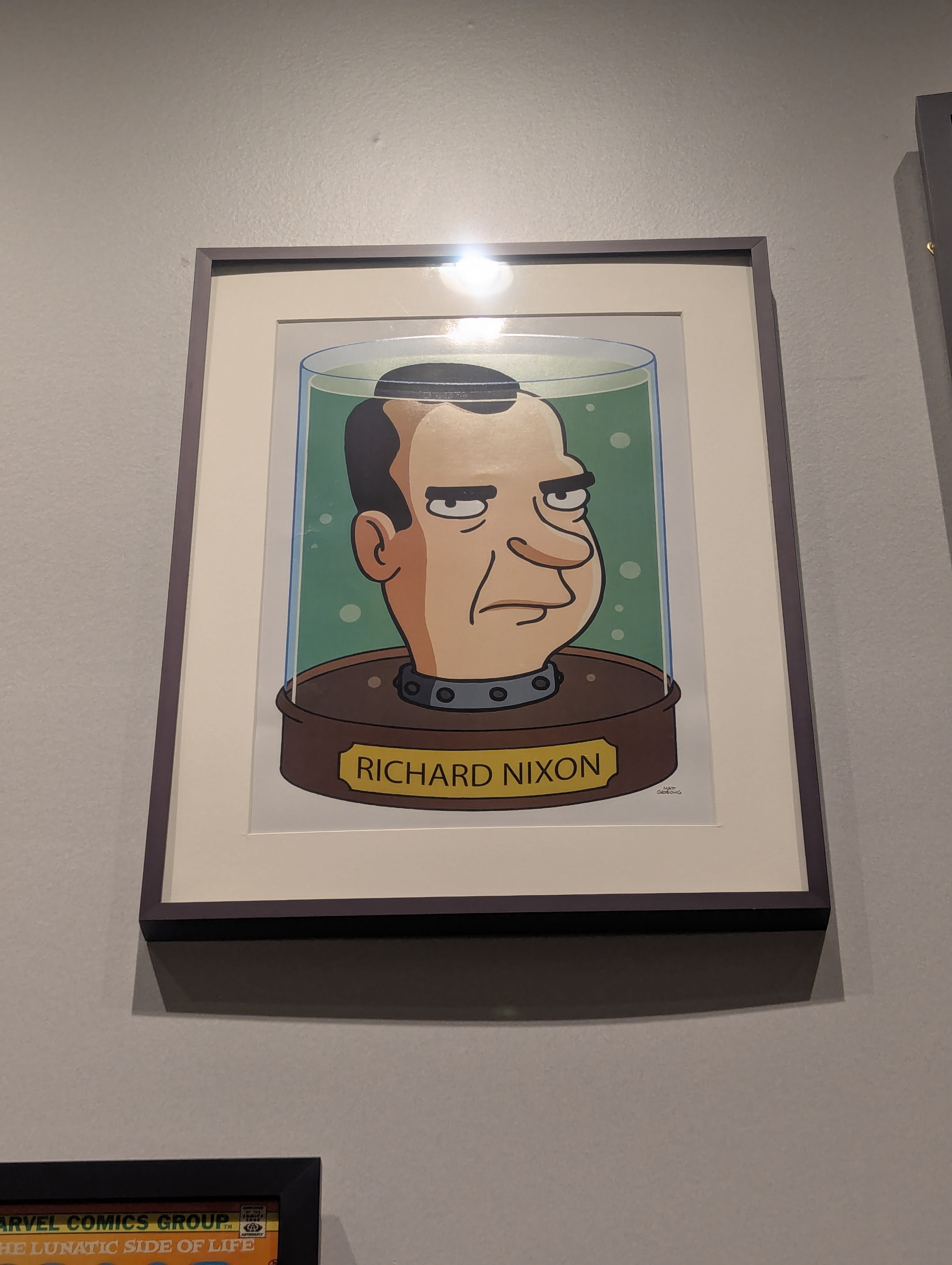
An illustration of Nixon, "President of Earth", from Futurama on display at the Richard Nixon Presidential Library and Museum

The President of Earth is introduced in the episode "When Aliens Attack", in the person of President McNeal. In a case of mistaken identity, McNeal is vaporized by invading Omicronians. In a later episode, "A Head in the Polls", a presidential election is held. Initially two clones, John Jackson and Jack Johnson, run for the presidency, representing the "Fingerlican" and "Tastycrat" parties, respectively. Later in the episode, Richard Nixon enters the running, his living head preserved in a glass jar and mounted on Bender's previously pawned body. At first Nixon's head is presented in a positive light, an effort by the writers to point out laudable elements of the real Richard Nixon's political career. However, it is soon revealed that Nixon's head has evil intentions, planning to "sell children's organs to zoos for meat" and "go into people's houses at night and wreck up the place!" His campaign is almost undone after Fry, Leela and Bender record his confession and use it to blackmail him into giving back Bender's body, but he wins by a single vote after overwhelming support from Earth's robotic voters in response to his colossal new robot body.

Nixon's head reappears as President of Earth in numerous subsequent episodes. Nixon runs for office a third time in "Decision 3012" against a candidate from the future, Chris Travers, sent back to prevent Nixon from destroying the world with his political decisions (Nixon demands the candidate's "earth certificate", parodying the controversy over Barack Obama's birth certificate). Nixon loses, but this causes a time paradox causing his challenger to disappear, and he wins by default. Series creator Matt Groening has expressed pleasure at being able to continue poking fun at Nixon thirty or forty years after he was in office.

Nixon's head's subsequent appearances in Futurama are often used for satirical humor. An example is the episode "Three Hundred Big Boys", where Nixon gives a $300 tax rebate to every Earthican, spoofing the rebate that was part of the Economic Growth and Tax Relief Reconciliation Act of 2001.

Other themes include voting and participating in the political process. In "A Head In The Polls", Fry debates if he should vote, saying "like one vote ever made a difference” after which Leela tells him about a robot candidate who won an election by one vote. Later in the episode, neither Fry, Bender, nor Leela end up voting after Fry and Leela forgot, and Bender cannot vote as he is a registered felon. Nixon, with a "gigantic missile-firing bionic body" wins the presidency by one robot vote. This might suggest that the President of Earth is elected directly, instead of via an electoral college.

== Democratic Order of Planets (D.O.O.P.) ==
The Futurama universe has a cooperative interplanetary organization known as the Democratic Order of Planets or D.O.O.P.. First mentioned in the episode "Love's Labours Lost in Space", it is explored in more detail in "Brannigan Begin Again", in which it is compared to the present-day United Nations and the Federation from Star Trek. The D.O.O.P. flag is styled on the flag of the United Nations with two olive branches representing peace, replacing the globe image with an atom diagram with the word "doop" in lowercase in the center. The D.O.O.P. maintains a military capability, most often led by Zapp Brannigan. The typography of D.O.O.P. is identical to that used by the one-hit wonder of the same name. Combating this group are a "rampaging alien race" that wants to take over Earth for commercial purposes named the Omicronians.

== Environmentalism ==
Episodes with environmental themes include "A Big Piece of Garbage", "The Problem with Popplers", "The Birdbot of Ice-Catraz", "Crimes of the Hot", "Fun on a Bun", "Attack of the Killer App" (partially), and "Fry Am the Egg Man."

Former Vice President of the United States and prominent environmentalist Al Gore is a recurring guest star, due in part to his daughter Kristin Gore's involvement in the show as a staff writer and story editor. He has appeared as himself in story segments set in the early 21st century ("Anthology of Interest I" and Bender's Big Score) and as his own head in a jar in the 31st century ("Crimes of the Hot" and Bender's Big Score). His portrait also adorns the $500 bill (written prior to the controversial election in 2000), and he is described as the "inventor of the environment, and first "Emperor of the Moon."

=== Global warming ===
The episode "Crimes of the Hot" centers around the issue of global warming. The temporary solution of cooling the Earth with giant ice cubes dropped periodically into the ocean is no longer possible because Halley's Comet, the source of the ice, has been mined completely hollow. At a scientific conference, led by Al Gore, Professor Farnsworth reveals that beer-powered robots, including Bender, are the source of current global warming, and President Nixon and Professor Wernstrom attempt to destroy all robots on Earth by tricking them to convene on the Galapagos Islands for a party, and then bathe the islands in electromagnetic waves from a satellite in space. Fry, Leela, and Farnsworth arrive in time, and Farnsworth tells every robot to aim their exhaust ports upward and expel their gasses, creating a makeshift engine that pushes Earth away from the sun, thus cooling Earth and causing the electromagnetic beams to miss. The episode was nominated for the Environmental Media Award in 2003. Al Gore's appearance in the episode was also listed as one of the 20 best animated politicians by The Boston Phoenix.

Al Gore's involvement with the show continued after it was cancelled in 2003. In promoting the documentary film An Inconvenient Truth, the producers of Futurama were approached to make a short animated trailer, starring Al Gore and Bender. This trailer was released online, and is included as an extra on the DVD of Bender's Big Score, with a commentary track by Al Gore, David X. Cohen and series creator Matt Groening. An Inconvenient Truth used a clip from the episode "Crimes of the Hot" to humorously explain how global warming works.

In "Xmas Story" Leela explains that snow still exists in the future because, even though global warming occurred, "nuclear winter canceled it out."

=== Conservationism ===
The episode "The Birdbot of Ice-Catraz" tackles the issues of pollution and its effect on wildlife. In a parody of the Exxon Valdez oil spill, a tanker spaceship (piloted by a sober Bender) spills its cargo of "dark matter oil" on a penguin colony on Pluto. The dark matter actually functioned as an aphrodisiac, or as the environmentalist puts it "a Penguin Spanish fly", so rather than killing the penguin population, the pollution vastly increases the speed and rate of their breeding, as even the males were producing eggs. This leads the conservationists, who originally set out to save the wildlife and clean up the oil spill, to resort to hunting the penguins to prevent them starving from overpopulation. The episode's stance on the issue of hunting was influenced by some of the writers on The Simpsons, which has also presented multiple viewpoints on controversial issues.

The episode "The Problem with Popplers" addresses conservationism in a similar fashion: it focuses primarily on the animal rights movement, parodying People for the Ethical Treatment of Animals with Mankind for Ethical Animal Treatment (M.E.A.T.) a vegan activist group that, among other things, attempt to teach carnivorous animals to eat tofu. This episode won an Environmental Media Award in 2000.

The Futurama movie Into the Wild Green Yonder showcases the fight between conservationism and the interests of big business; the construction of the universe's largest giant mini golf course (headed by Amy's father, Leo Wong) threatens to destroy 12% (an entire branch) of the Milky Way. An environmental survey headed by Professor Farnsworth and the Futurama crew discovers an asteroid full of primitive life, orbiting a violet dwarf star. However, Farnsworth has been bribed by Leo, and declares the destruction 'environmentally friendly', leading to plans for the dwarf star to be imploded, creating a black hole. This leads to two groups trying to sabotage this plan – a group of eco-feminists, who are joined by Amy, Leela and LaBarbara Conrad, who start destroying equipment, machines and sections of the golf course, and even accidentally kill Nixon's beloved vice-president, Agnew. The second group is the Legion of Madfellows, a secret organization of mind readers, of which Fry joins. They prophesize a new green age, headed by a resurgence in the life force Chi, which they believe will be started by the asteroid and the dwarf star. A resurgence in the Chi would halt the extinction rate, and increase the diversity of life by preserving endangered species DNA and reintroducing extinct life forms through the Encyclopod. Fry is given the responsibility to preserve and protect it at all costs.

== Social and other issues ==
The episode "Proposition Infinity" depicts an attempt to legalize "robosexual marriage," or marriage between robots and humans, after Bender and Amy fall in love. It closely parodies the events surrounding, as well as arguments for and against, Proposition 8 of California from the 2008 election. Ultimately, "robosexual marriage" is legalized with this "future civil rights movement." However, upon being passed, Bender breaks up with Amy due to her desire for a monogamous relationship. The episode "Bend Her" depicts Bender transitioning to compete as a woman in the Olympics, as a parody of the inclusion of transgender women in sports. It has been criticized for promoting sexist and transphobic stereotypes.

Throughout the Futurama episodes there is a theme of, as series creator Matt Groening put it in 1999, a "corporate, commercial, confusing world where the military is just as stupid as it is currently" with a "corrupt megacorporation" named MomCorp which is run by a "scrawny elderly woman" who is very rich "from manufacturing Mom's Old-Fashioned Robot Oil." This theme is expanded by characters being "thoroughly inundated by advertising, especially subliminal advertising that comes out of your pillow into your dreams" and having "ridiculous-but-cool tech gadgets" that don't work as they were expected to, not improving the economy.

Additionally, people are tested to find out what they would be "best at in life," as shown in "Space Pilot 3000" and other episodes, a choice that Bender, Fry, and other characters reject, wanting to "go against their programming, whether or not they will be successful."

The show also criticized jingoism in "A Taste of Freedom", lampooned groups like Parents Television Council and Parents Against Media Violence with groups like "Fathers Against Rude Television" and criticized the star system in "Bender Should Not Be Allowed on TV" and "Calculon 2.0" while addressing the controversy around genetically modified food in "Leela and the Genestalk".

Elsewhere in the show, the place of robots in human society and sentient robots are also addressed as issues which fit with the science fiction genre.

Other than this, numerous episodes address the themes of time travel, including "Möbius Dick", "All the Presidents' Heads", "Roswell That Ends Well" and "Space Pilot 3000", plagiarism and exploitation in "Yo Leela Leela", and 3-D printing in "Forty Percent Leadbelly". Additionally, in "The Mutants Are Revolting", the "mutants" engage in a revolution to demand their rights to live on the surface, an event which may reference the Stonewall riots.

== Reaction ==
The Boston Phoenix included the episode "A Head in the Polls" in a list of the best political satires in animation.

During the 2016 presidential election in the United States, voice actor Billy West read quotes of Donald Trump's doctor in the voice of Dr. Zoidberg. He also read quotes from Trump in the voice of Zapp Brannigan. Also during the election, there were popular memes which imposed Trump's quotations onto images of the captain of the Nimbus, Zapp Brannigan.
