= The Gathering Storm =

The Gathering Storm may refer to:

== Books ==
- The Gathering Storm (novel), a fantasy novel by Robert Jordan and Brandon Sanderson
- The Gathering Storm, the first volume of Sir Winston Churchill's The Second World War
- The Gathering Storm, a fantasy novel in the Crown of Stars series by Kate Elliott
- Resistance: The Gathering Storm, the official novel of the PlayStation videogame Resistance: Fall of Man

== Video games ==
- Heroes of Might and Magic IV: The Gathering Storm, an expansion pack for the turn-based strategy game
- Civilization VI: Gathering Storm, a 2019 expansion pack for Civilization VI
- Starshatter: The Gathering Storm, a 2004 video game

== Film and television ==
- The Gathering Storm (1974 film), a television film about Churchill, starring Richard Burton
- The Gathering Storm (2002 film), a television film about Churchill, starring Albert Finney
- "The Gathering Storm", a BattleTech: The Animated Series episode
- "Chapter 4: The Gathering Storm", an episode of The Book of Boba Fett
- "Gathering Storm" (advertisement), 2009 video advertisement in opposition to same-sex marriage
