= List of fictional judges =

This is a list of judges in fiction. The list also includes real people portrayed as judges in works of fiction.

== Fictional judges ==
- Philip Banks (The Fresh Prince of Bel-Air)
- Morag Bellingham (Home and Away)
- The Brethren (John Grisham novel)
- Chamberlain Haller (My Cousin Vinny)
- Annabelle Collins (Brookside)
- Judge Conti (Desperate Housewives)
- Pao Lung Sing (Hail the Judge)
- Courthouse judges:
  - Judge Homer Conklin
  - Judge Wyatt E. Jackson
  - Judge Justine Parkes
  - Judge Myron Winkleman
- Judge Dee
- Judge Dredd judges:
  - Judge Anderson
  - Galen DeMarco
  - Judge Dredd
  - Chief Judge Fargo
  - Jack Point
- Marshall Eriksen (How I Met Your Mother)
- Claude Frollo (The Hunchback of Notre-Dame)
- Myrtle Fu - Chief Justice of the Supreme Court of Earth (Futurama)
- Judge Fudge (Drawn Together)
- Arthur Galzethron (Lost)
- Gavel (Marvel comics)
- Law & Order judges:
  - Elizabeth Donnelly
  - Barry Moredock
  - Jamie Ross (Law & Order)
- Judge Leah Gould (Star Trek: The Next Generation)
- Milton Hardcastle
- His Honorable Tyranny (Homestuck)
- Doc Hudson (Cars)
- Joan Hunt (Body of Proof)
- Judge Hannah Lampert (All My Children)
- Living Tribunal (Marvel comics)
- Rhonda Pearlman (The Wire)
- Pei Xuan (Water Margin)
- Judge Rosetta Reide
- Judge Rummy (eponymous comic strip)
- Judge Monica Ryan (L.A. Law)
- Judge Roy Snyder (The Simpsons)
- Judge Harold T. Stone (Night Court)
- Judge Turpin (the musical Sweeney Todd)
- Judge Arthur Vandelay (Seinfeld)
- Vigilante (DC comics)
- Ling Woo (Ally McBeal)
- Gallerian Marlon (Evillious Chronicles)
- Neuvillette (Genshin Impact)
- Toshiko Beppu (the Japanese version of Legal High)
- Do Bun-kyung (the South Korea version of Legal High)
- The Devil Judge judges:
  - Kang Yo-han
  - Kim Ga-on
  - Min Jung-ho
- Tomoko Inotsume (The Tiger and Her Wings)

== Real people as judges in fiction ==
- The Futurama film Into the Wild Green Yonder includes Paula Abdul, Samuel Alito, Björk, Snoop Dogg, Janeane Garofalo, Ruth Bader Ginsburg, Sandra Day O'Connor, Katey Sagal, Antonin Scalia's head, David Souter, John Paul Stevens, Clarence Thomas, and Abe Vigoda as Associate Justices of the Supreme Court of Earth.
- Judge Bao, a fictionalized version of Bao Zheng
- Judge Holden (Blood Meridian)

== See also ==
- Legal drama
- Perry Mason (1957 TV series)#Cast and characters
- Politics in Futurama
- Supreme Court of the United States in fiction
