= Brannigan, Begin Again =

- Futurama episode
- Episode no.: Season 2 Episode 2
- Directed by: Jeffrey Lynch
- Written by: Lewis Morton
- Production code: 2ACV02
- Original air date: November 28, 1999

Episode features
- Opening caption: Not Y3K Compliant
- Opening cartoon: "Pigs in a Polka" from Merrie Melodies by Warner Bros. Cartoons (1943)
- Commentary: Matt Groening: Callum Lunt; Jeffrey Lynch; David X. Cohen

Episode chronology
← Previous "I Second That Emotion"	Next → "A Head in the Polls"
- Futurama season 2

"Brannigan, Begin Again" is the second episode in the second season of the American animated television series Futurama, and the 15th episode of the series overall. It originally aired on the Fox network in the United States on November 28, 1999. The episode was written by Lewis Morton and directed by Jeffrey Lynch.

== Plot ==
The episode opens with Fry and Bender playing a violent, futuristic version of chess, where Bender's bishop and Fry's knight fight. Fry wins, prompting Bender to send all of his chess pieces after Fry.

The Planet Express crew arrives at the ribbon cutting of the new Democratic Order Of Planets (D.O.O.P.) headquarters in orbit around the Neutral Planet, in order to deliver the oversized scissors that will be used for the ribbon-cutting ceremony. After deciding the Neutral Planet is evil and deceptive, Zapp Brannigan captures and interrogates the crew, thinking that they are assassins. Shortly thereafter, he accidentally destroys the D.O.O.P. headquarters by attempting to use the Nimbus' laser to cut the ribbon from space.

At the former D.O.O.P. headquarters in Weehawken, New Jersey, Brannigan is court-martialed for his actions. Seeing the lack of proper testimony being given, Leela takes the stand to expose Brannigan as "the sorriest captain I've ever seen", but under cross-examination, Brannigan attempts to discredit her by getting her to confess their one-night stand. After a very short deliberation, the jury finds Brannigan guilty. Brannigan then unjustly claims that it was mostly Kif Kroker's idea. Both are stripped of all their titles and dishonorably discharged from D.O.O.P. service. Unable to find employment, the pair wander the streets until they arrive at the Planet Express building. Leela tries to turn them away, but Professor Farnsworth decides hiring Brannigan would be good for the company's public image.

The augmented crew is sent to deliver pillows to a hotel on Stumbos 4, a high-gravity planet. Despite Leela's order to deliver one at a time, Fry, Bender, and Zapp decide to deliver all the pillows at once, which, in the intense gravity, causes the hover dolly to collapse. As punishment, Leela angrily demands that they deliver the pillows by hand instead of using the backup dolly, which causes resentment among the crew.

Fry, Bender, and Zapp stage a mutiny against Leela, and lock her in the laundry room. Brannigan decides to attack his imagined nemesis, the Neutral Planet, thinking this will make him a hero and get him reinstated as a D.O.O.P. captain. When Fry and Bender discover the plan is a suicide mission, they free Leela and she retakes command. With Fry and Bender's help, she foils Zapp's plan after he jumps ship with Kif.

After returning to Earth, Leela testifies that Brannigan was an amazing hero, and D.O.O.P. reinstates Zapp and Kif, thus keeping them out of her life for a little while longer, since Kif annoys her with his complaints about working under Zapp. Leela also decides to be more lenient with Fry and Bender, but when the Professor overrules this, the three consider a mutiny against him.

== Continuity ==
- The majority of the jury at Brannigan's trial are characters from previous Futurama episodes. Among the familiar ones are: one half of Glurmo from "Fry and the Slurm Factory"; a Robot Elder from "Fear of a Bot Planet"; and Fry's Trisolian advisor Gorgak from "My Three Suns".
- While at the D.O.O.P. headquarters, Fry is shown talking to a woman from the planet "Amazonia". Fry and the rest of the Planet Express crew would later end up on Amazonia in "Amazon Women in the Mood".
- In the cold opening, the 3-D chess game Bender and Fry play have the following characters as chess pieces: a Decapodian; a Horrible Gelatinous Blob; Lrrr the ruler of Omicron Persei 8; a Trisolian from "My Three Suns"; and an Amphibiosan.
- When Leela regains control of the ship as it is about to impact the Neutral Planet, she says "I don't want to die at the age of 25!". Bender questions this number.
- When attempting to explain to Fry what D.O.O.P. is, Hermes compares it to the Federation from Star Trek, even though it is later revealed in "Where No Fan Has Gone Before" that any verbal mention of Star Trek is an arrestable offense.

== Cultural references ==
The episode opens with Fry and Bender playing a game of chess similar to that played by Chewbacca and R2-D2 in Star Wars Episode IV: A New Hope. The sequence where Zapp attempts to make a living as a gigolo is taken from Midnight Cowboy, including the film's theme, "Everybody's Talkin'" by Harry Nilsson.

== Reception ==
In 2006, IGN ranked this episode as number five in their list of the "Top 25 Futurama episodes". The episode ranked highly in large part due to the character of Zapp Brannigan, particularly the Midnight Cowboy parody with Kif and Brannigan as Dustin Hoffman and Jon Voight, respectively. In the site's 2019 reranking, several years after the show's first revival finished, "Brannigan Begin Again" only dropped to sixth. A review on 411mania also noted that the return of Brannigan was a highpoint of the episode and gave it an overall rating of 8.0/10 or "very good". In Doug Pratt's DVD Pratt noted that the episode combined the series' science fiction setting with good character humor. Zack Handlen of The A.V. Club gave the episode a B+, stating, "'Brannigan Begin Again' has some great gags, including what might be the lines from the series I quote most often. As oddly tensionless as the plot is, there’s still enough spine to hold up some solid scenes, and Zapp remains reliably entertaining asshole. DOOP never becomes quite as important as it sounds like it should, but it counts as world-building, and the visit to the planet with extra-heavy gravity allows the opportunity for some excellent science-based humor."
