= EyePhone =

EyePhone may refer to:

- The EyePhone, a virtual reality headset that was released in 1987 by American company VPL Research
- The eyePhone, a fictional augmented reality-enabled smart glasses product depicted in the episode "Attack of the Killer App" of the American animated sitcom Futurama

== See also ==
- iPhone
