= S.T.U.N. (band) =

American punk rock band

- Also known as: Scream Toward The Uprising Of Non-Conformity
- Origin: Los Angeles, United States
- Genres: Punk rock Post hardcore
- Years active: 2000-2003
- Labels: Geffen Records
- Past members: Christiane J.; Neil Spies; Nicks S.; Bobby Alt

S.T.U.N. (Scream Toward the Uprising of Non-Conformity) was a punk band from Los Angeles, formed in 2000. The band signed with Geffen Records in 2002.

Their first and only album, Evolution of Energy, was released on June 24, 2003.

S.T.U.N's influences include The Clash, Sex Pistols, Pixies, Noam Chomsky, Daniel Quinn, Jane's Addiction, Radiohead, Depeche Mode, The Smiths, Super Furry Animals, and David Bowie.

== See also ==
- S.T.U.N. Interview by Mary Ellen Gustafson, Ink 19
- S.T.U.N. (Scream Toward the Uprising of Nonconformity) - Music - Neoseeker Forums (Band profile) Arcanium, Neo Era Media, Inc.
