= Gracie & Pedro: Pets to the Rescue =

Gracie & Pedro: Pets to the Rescue!
- Theatrical release poster
- Directed by: Kevin Donovan; Gottfried Roodt
- Screenplay by: Jaisa C. Bishop; Bruce A. Taylor; Kelly Peters
- Story by: Jaisa C. Bishop; Bruce A. Taylor
- Produced by: Amy Katherine Taylor
- Starring: Susan Sarandon; Bill Nighy; Brooke Shields; Danny Trejo; Alicia Silverstone; Al Franken
- Music by: Deon van Heerden
- Production companies: Second Chance Productions; Polycat Animation; Storywarrior Media Capital
- Distributed by: Second Chance Productions (United States); Filmfinity (South Africa)
- Release dates: August 9, 2024 (United Kingdom); October 18, 2024 (United States); October 25, 2024 (South Africa)
- Running time: 87 minutes
- Countries: United States; South Africa; Canada
- Language: English

Gracie & Pedro: Pets to the Rescue, also known as Gracie and Pedro: Mission Impossible, is a 2024 animated buddy adventure film directed by Kevin Donovan and Gottfried Roodt and produced by Amy Katherine Taylor, with a screenplay by Jaisa C. Bishop, Bruce A. Taylor, and Kelly Peters from a story by Bishop and Taylor. An international co-production between Canada, South Africa and the United States, the film features voice actors including Claire Alan, Cory Doran, Bianca Alongi, Bill Nighy, Susan Sarandon, Alicia Silverstone, Brooke Shields, and Danny Trejo. The story follows family pets Gracie and Pedro, as they go on a cross-country journey from California to Utah after their owners lose them while flying from Los Angeles to Salt Lake City.

Produced by Second Chance Productions, Polycat Animation and Storywarrior Media Capital, Gracie & Pedro: Pets to the Rescue was released theatrically in the United States on October 18, 2024. It received negative reviews from critics.

== Plot ==
In the evening of the Los Angeles city, a snappy, snobbish, pampered, jewelry-deciding Cocker Spaniel Gracie lives with timid, brave, garbage-food loving, and clumsy British Shorthair Pedro. Both don't get along together when they are adopted by a family. Pedro had been rescued by them after being found by shelter, locked in a box. Gracie dislikes Pedro as he eats everything from the garbage, sleeps in her bed, and even sheds in her jewelry, much to her exasperation. After a brawl causes all of the cups to break, the family places each pet into one carrier so they can get along together, But Pedro breaks Gracie‘s necklace when she refuses to share her one can of dog food with him.

The family leave in the airport to go to Utah for their vacation. Gracie recognized she forgot her favorite Squeaky toy, Mr. Senor and Mr. Señor and goes to retrieve him. Pedro also forgets his favorite cat scratcher and goes to retrieve it. Gracie and Pedro encounter new animals, such as Conrad, a condor, and Shades, a bunny with a pair of sunglasses. As Gracie and Pedro finally reach the airport, The boxes they are on fall out of the truck. After Gracie and Pedro awaken, they manage to reach the airport, but their arguing causes chaos, and just as they get onto the plane as stowaways, they destroy the stowaway piece, causing them to fall out of the airplane, leaving the pets stranded. Gracie is panicked and wants to return, while Pedro thinks it was her fault to go retrieve her squeaky toys before the trip. They decide to work together to return on the 500-mile walk to Utah.

Gracie and Pedro meet Willow, a horse who wants to do everything with his owner Detective Doyle and his British-ferret Sherlock walk across the line. Pedro tries to convince Gracie to go the other way, hearing that the plane had gone the other direction. Gracie refuses and encounters a dog walker, believing he can follow her way home. An annoyed Pedro drags her through with his leash to find the path, eventually leading her into a garbage can headed for Utah. They are ambushed by cats who take off their collars, and they are captured by animal control. Gracie learns that Pedro is scared to go back to the Pound, as he was when he was taken away from his cat tribe family after he kept going to steal food and mess with them with a nearby family neighbor. A snake duo Sissy-Chrissy rescues the pets after the truck stops at a gas station and take them to an underground home where they are due to be sacrificed through a viper bite and dumped in lava.

Pedro willingly decides to do the viper bite, but Gracie is chosen instead. Before she's bitten by the snake, they are overheard by a group of cats that they slashed off the collars back at the alley, revealing deception. Gracie and Pedro escape and jump into a sewer river, being sucked into a vortex and travel in a series of pipes underneath. They are then spat out into a river, and sissy and Chrissy vow to get the pets back and continue their search.

Once the pets reach shore, Gracie reluctantly decides to let Pedro find the way. After going into a truck, traveling on foot for a while, and then going by train, they managed to reach a boat that is delivering several cans and hens. Gracie releases the hens to prove to Pedro that birds can fly, only to end up causing them to all fall into the water and float away. Sherlock And Willow arrived to rescue the pets, taking them into a package and sending them on the rest of the way to Utah (only because Willow had noticed there was land with lots of snow and polar bears, and had a stamp he received when he was a horse).

When the package arrives in Antarctica, Gracie and Pedro tried to cross the lake filled with freezing water. Gracie tries to prove that walking across can be useful, but Pedro isn't sure. As Gracie crosses the lake, The ice begins to crack and she tries to make it across, but falls into the icy water, much to Pedro's horror. Pedro overcomes his fear of water and jumps in to rescue Gracie. Surprised that Pedro has actually faced his fear, Gracie apologizes for being such a jerk to him and the two become friends. Sissy-Chrissy try to grab the pets, but they fall into the water and end up getting frozen in a giant iced block.

Gracie and Pedro notice applying that is about to leave and attempt to get onto the plane, with the help from the animals they had reunited. However, Gracie loses her necklace and her squeaky toy while trying to catch up with the rest of the animals. As Gracie jumps down to get it, she is hit by a car and Pedro quickly brings her to safety. Believing her to be gone, he slowly nuzzles Against her muzzle. However, she awakens, much to his relief and happiness. They managed to reach the plane and travel the rest of the leg of the journey to Utah, Finally reuniting with their families. Sissy-Chrissy try to get their viper to break the window, but he gets trapped in an air vent and end up getting crushed by a boulder, a piano, a brick wall, and a giant tiger, which promptly chases the snakes after eating them and coughing them up. Gracie and Panther are happy to finally be viewed their owners, recognizing that all friends, and roommates, come from all shapes and sizes.

== Voice cast ==
- Claire Alan as Gracie, a pampered Cocker Spaniel and the protagonist of the film. She is Pedro's sister
- Cory Doran as Pedro, a British Shorthair who is Gracie's brother
- Bianca Alongi as Sophie, a young girl that owns Gracie
- Bill Nighy as Conrad, a British-accented condor
- Susan Sarandon as Shades, a friendly bunny who puts on a pair of glasses.
- Alicia Silverstone as Sissy-Chrissy, a ring-necked snake duo who love Reggaeton
- Danny Trejo as Laurence, a goldfish with dentures who lived in a portable fish tank
- Brooke Shields as Willow, a Thoroughbred horse
- Al Franken as Gramps, the family grandfather
- James Kee as Doyle, a detective and Sherlock's person
  - Kee also plays James, Sophie's father
- Mike Nadajewski as Sherlock, a ferret who is Doyle's pet.
- Ron Pardo as Wade, a skinny rat, and Rasputin's best friend
- John Stocker as Rasputin, a chubby rat, who is Wade's best friend

== Production ==
The film was confirmed in a draft in 2022, and it was completed in November 2023 with casting being announced.

The film was featured in the European Film Market in February 2024.

== Release ==
In April 2024, an official trailer for the film was released. It featured several scenes, not in the trailers, such as Pedro swimming underwater from the boat desperately, Pedro accidentally letting go of the bridge and falling into the water, much Gracie's annoyance, a scene where Gracie is covered in the tablecloth, and where Gracie shoves a bird into an air vent and Breaks her back. There is also a gag where Sherlock claims that a snake had beat the tip of his tail, and soon it turned into his favorite tail mingle.

The film was released in Russia on May 23, 2024, in the United Kingdom on August 9, 2024, In both Portugal, Brazil and Mexico on August 15, 2024, in the United States on October 18, 2024, In South Africa on October 25, 2024, in Romania on January 24, 2025 and in Greece on February 28, 2025. It had yet to be released on DVD in the UK.

== Reception ==
The Guardian stated, "By-the-numbers animation does nothing to lift cliched tale that squanders the talents of A-list actors including Bill Nighy and Susan Sarandon". The website Blazing Minds was also very critical of the film. A review on the independent website LouReviews, although less negative, mentioned various flaws and inconsistencies in the plot and animation, while The Peach Review wrote, "The film relies heavily on Gracie and Pedro's tumultuous relationship which isn't healthy or humorous. Their insult-laden coexistence doesn't bode well for viewing and, when coupled with C− animation, makes for a difficult experience to sit through for close to 90 minutes." Christy Lemire of RogerEbert.com gave the film zero out of four stars and wrote, "Shrill, frantic, and hideous to look at, Gracie & Pedro: Pets to the Rescue isn't just one of the worst animated movies of the year—it's one of the worst movies of the year, period."

Review website ItGirl World UK was more positive, writing, "It's a lively action-packed film, with real wholesome family values at its core."
