= Of Good Stock =

- Written by: Melissa Ross

Premiere
- Date: June 2015
- Place: Manhattan Theatre Club
- Directed by: Lynne Meadow

Of Good Stock is a play written by Melissa Ross and directed by Lynne Meadow. It premiered at Manhattan Theatre Club's off Broadway Mainstage in June 2015.

== Synopsis ==
The play centres around three sisters, and the men in their lives, who gather at their family home for a summer weekend. Their reunion ignites passion, humour and unanticipated upheavals.

== Cast ==
- Alicia Silverstone
- Heather Lind
- Jennifer Mudge
- Kelly AuCoin
- Nate Miller
- Greg Keller
