= Alicia Silverstone =

American actress (born 1976)

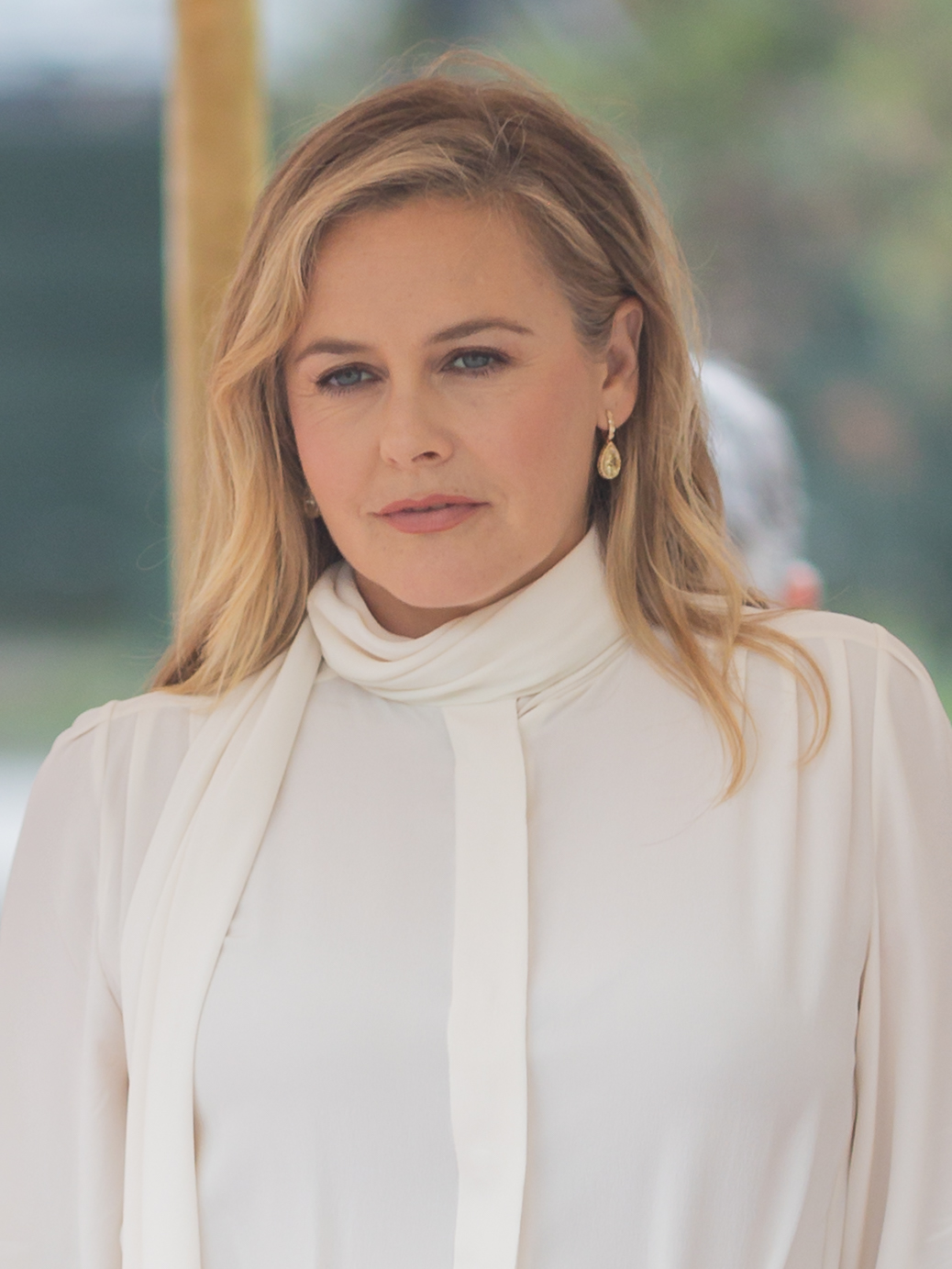
- Silverstone in 2025
- Born: October 4, 1976 (age 50); San Francisco, California, U.S.
- Occupation: Actress
- Years active: 1992–present
- Spouse: Christopher Jarecki (m. 2005; div. 2018)
- Children: 1
- Website: thekindlife.com

Alicia Silverstone (/əˈliːsiə/ ə-LEE-see-ə; born October 4, 1976) is an American actress. She made her film debut in the thriller The Crush (1993), earning the 1994 MTV Movie Award for Best Breakthrough Performance, and gained further prominence as a teen idol when she appeared in the music videos for Aerosmith's songs "Cryin'", "Amazing", and "Crazy". She went on to star as Cher Horowitz in the teen comedy film Clueless (1995), which earned her a multi-million-dollar deal with Columbia Pictures. In 1997, she portrayed Batgirl in the superhero film Batman & Robin.

Silverstone received a Golden Globe nomination for Best Actress – Television Series Musical or Comedy for her role in the short-lived NBC series Miss Match (2003). She has continued to act in film, television and on stage. A vegan, Silverstone has endorsed PETA activities and published two cookbooks: The Kind Diet (2009) and The Kind Mama (2014).

== Early life ==
Silverstone was born on October 4, 1976, in San Francisco, California, the daughter of Deirdre "Didi" Silverstone (née Radford), a Scottish former Pan Am flight attendant, and Monty Silverstone, an English real estate agent. Silverstone has two older siblings: a half-sister from her father's previous marriage, Kezi Silverstone, and a brother, David Silverstone. She grew up in Hillsborough, California. Her father was born to a Jewish family and her mother converted to Conservative Judaism before marriage. Silverstone had a bat mitzvah ceremony. She began modeling when she was eight, and was cast in television commercials, with the first being for Domino's Pizza at the age of fourteen. She attended Crocker Middle School, then San Mateo High School.

== Career ==
=== 1990s ===
Her first credited acting role was on The Wonder Years in 1992, in the episode "Road Test", as Kevin's high school "dream girl". Silverstone made her film debut when she obtained the leading role in the erotic thriller The Crush, playing a teenage girl who sets out to ruin an older man after he spurns her affections; she became legally emancipated at the age of 15 to work the hours required for the shooting schedule of the film. She won two awards at the 1994 MTV Movie Awards for the role—Best Breakthrough Performance and Best Villain. Silverstone made some television films in her early career, including Torch Song, Cool and the Crazy, and Scattered Dreams.

After seeing her in The Crush, Marty Callner decided Silverstone would be perfect for a role in a music video he was directing for Aerosmith, called "Cryin'." Silverstone is shown getting a navel piercing in the music video, which has largely been credited as introducing the navel piercing to mainstream culture. She was subsequently cast in two more Aerosmith videos, "Amazing" and "Crazy". These were hugely successful for both the band and Silverstone, making her a household name. After seeing Silverstone in the three videos, filmmaker Amy Heckerling decided to cast her in the coming-of-age comedy Clueless, in the role of Cher Horowitz, a sweet but spoiled girl living in Beverly Hills. Clueless became a hit and critical darling during the summer of 1995, and as a result, Silverstone signed a deal with Columbia-TriStar valued between $8 and $10 million. As part of the package, she got a three-year first-look deal for her own production company, First Kiss Productions. Silverstone also won Best Female Performance and Most Desirable Female at the 1996 MTV Movie Awards, plus awards from Blockbuster Entertainment Award, Kids' Choice Awards, National Board of Review and an American Comedy Award for her performance in the film.

Silverstone had three other film releases in 1995—Le Nouveau monde, Hideaway and The Babysitter. Le Nouveau monde, which is a French drama about Americans, saw her play the love interest of a French boy. In the film adaptation of the novel by Dean Koontz, Hideaway, she played a teenage girl whose father dies in a car accident and is revived two hours later. The film The Babysitter was a B erotic thriller directed by Guy Ferland based on the eponymous short story by Robert Coover in his 1969 collection Pricksongs and Descants.

In 1996, she starred in the direct-to-video thriller True Crime as a Catholic school student searching for a murderer of teenage girls. Her next role was Barbara Wilson/Batgirl in Batman & Robin (1997). Budgeted at $160 million, the film grossed a modest $238 million worldwide, and her turn as Batgirl received polarized reviews from critics, who also considered the film to be one of the worst films of all time. Silverstone won a Razzie Award for Worst Supporting Actress, but received a Blimp Award at the Kids' Choice Awards for the role.

Also in 1997, the first film by Silverstone's production company, Excess Baggage, was released. In the film, she plays a young woman who stages her own kidnapping to get her wealthy father's attention, only to actually be kidnapped by a car thief. The film only grossed $14.5 million in North America, and received mediocre reviews from critics; Roger Ebert wrote that she was miscast and gave a performance that was "no better than OK". Silverstone starred as the female lead in the romantic comedy Blast from the Past (1999), directed by Hugh Wilson and co-starring Brendan Fraser, Christopher Walken and Sissy Spacek. Critical response towards the film was mixed, while it made a modest $40 million globally.

=== 2000s ===
For the next decade, Silverstone stepped aside from the spotlight and opted to focus on smaller-scale films and theater. In Love's Labour's Lost (2000), a film adaptation of William Shakespeare's play, directed by Kenneth Branagh, Silverstone played the Princess of France, a role which required her to sing and dance. While critical response was mixed, the film received a limited theatrical release. Film critic James Berardinelli felt that Silverstone, "while not completely at ease with all of her dialogue, is surprisingly credible" in her portrayal.

Silverstone executive produced and provided the voice of Sharon Spitz, the lead part, in the Canadian animated television series Braceface, from 2001 to 2003. During this period, she played the bassist of a rock band in the independent comedy Global Heresy (2002), opposite Peter O'Toole and Joan Plowright, and made her Broadway debut alongside Kathleen Turner and Jason Biggs in a stage version of The Graduate, which ran between 2002 and 2003 at the Plymouth Theatre. Silverstone also starred as one of several disgruntled bank employees trying to rob the same bank in the small-scale comedy Scorched (2003), co-starring Rachael Leigh Cook, Woody Harrelson and John Cleese.

Silverstone signed on to headline the 2003 NBC television series Miss Match, as Kate Fox, a Los Angeles matrimonial attorney who doubles as a high-end matchmaker. The show was canceled after only 11 episodes had aired, and Variety in its review for the show, wrote: "It's a shame that she's stuck with such wafer-thin material here, because Silverstone is undoubtedly a fun, perky presence on the small screen." Nevertheless, she earned a Golden Globe Award nomination for Best Actress – Television Series Musical or Comedy.

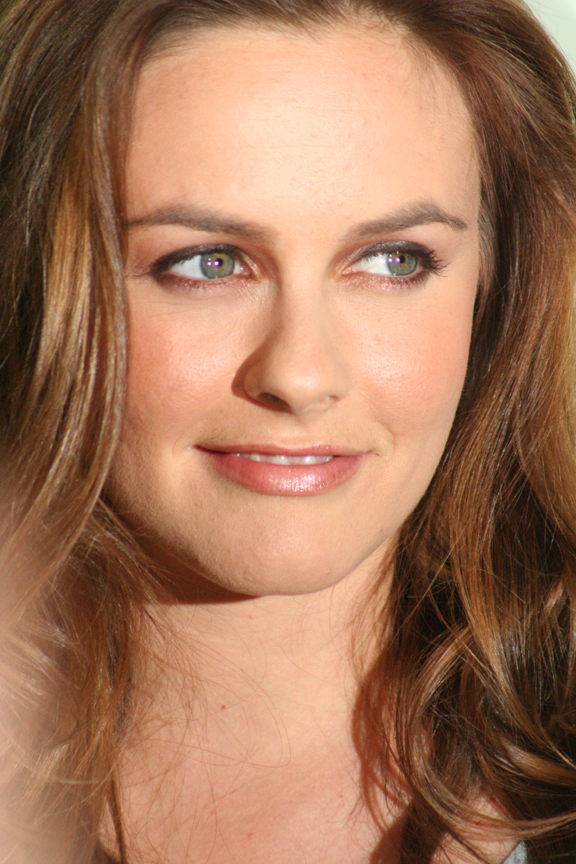
Silverstone at the 2006 Sanctuary Gala

In 2004, Silverstone played a news reporter turned villainess in Scooby-Doo 2: Monsters Unleashed, opposite Sarah Michelle Gellar and Freddie Prinze Jr. Despite a negative critical response, the film grossed $181 million at the international box office.

In the comedy Beauty Shop (2005), a spinoff of the Barbershop film franchise, Silverstone appeared with Queen Latifah, playing a naive and bubbly stylist of an Atlanta-area salon. The film was her final wide release of the decade in North America, where it grossed $37.2 million.

Her next film, the thriller Silence Becomes You, received a DVD release in 2005. Silverstone did a pilot episode in 2005 with Fox called Queen B, where she played a delusional former high school prom queen, but it was not picked up for production. In 2006, she starred in an ABC pilot called Pink Collar as a woman working in a law firm, but like Queen B, this pilot was not picked up to series.

Silverstone portrayed the close friend of a teenager turned secret agent in the action-spy film Stormbreaker (2006), directed by Geoffrey Sax and co-starring Alex Pettyfer, Ewan McGregor and Mickey Rourke. Despite a $40 million budget, the film made $23 million worldwide and was largely dismissed by critics. USA Today described Silverstone as "simply ghastly" in her role, while View London remarked that there was "strong support" from the actress. She obtained the role of a single mother returning to her hometown after a lengthy absence in the made-for-Hallmark Hall of Fame television film Candles on Bay Street, based on the book by Cathie Pelletier.

Silverstone continued her theater work, next appearing in David Mamet's Boston Marriage (2007), a play exploring the relationship between two upper-class women, where the actress played what was described by Los Angeles Times as the "clueless and hyper-emotional Scottish maid" of one of them. The production was presented at the Geffen Playhouse theater in Los Angeles, with Variety writing that Silverstone "steals the show [in her role]. Her Scottish accent is good, her comic delivery is fresh, and she gets the maximum laugh value from each wobbly curtsey. Her character is the one thing in the show that Mamet gets absolutely right, although she is used a bit repetitively." In the same year, she starred as a secretary in the theater production Speed-the-Plow, a satire of Hollywood executives. The production, presented at Geffen Playhouse, was directed by Randall Arney and penned by David Mamet. The Hollywood Reporter concluded the play was "fueled" by "a spectacular tour de force" from Silverstone.

In 2008, Silverstone filmed another unaired ABC pilot alongside Megan Mullally called Bad Mother's Handbook and made a cameo appearance in the action-comedy Tropic Thunder. In 2009, she starred in the music video for Rob Thomas's single "Her Diamonds", and acted in Donald Margulies' production of Time Stands Still, set in Brooklyn and revolving around the relationships of two couples. Like Silverstone's previous few stage projects, it ran at the Geffen Playhouse in Los Angeles. By the late 2000s, she ventured into writing, releasing her book The Kind Diet, a guide to vegan nutrition, in 2009; she simultaneously launched its associated website The Kind Life. The Kind Diet topped the "Hardcover Advice & Misc." category of The New York Times bestseller list.

=== 2010s ===
Silverstone continued to focus on theater and independent productions throughout the 2010s, but acted considerably more than in the previous decade. In 2010, she reprised her role in the Broadway production of Time Stands Still, alongside Laura Linney. Daniel Sullivan directed the play, and described Silverstone as "a breath of fresh air" which had a general positive reception among critics. The New York Times felt that Silverstone "brings warmth, actorly intelligence, and delicate humor." She filmed a small segment in the independent comedy sequel Elektra Luxx (2010), but her part was not included in the final cut of the film.

Silverstone obtained the role of the teacher of a Manhattan private-school senior in the teen romance drama The Art of Getting By (2011), which premiered at the Sundance Film Festival. The ensemble comedy Butter (2011) saw her play the adoptive mother of a 12-year-old African-American girl who enters a local butter sculpturing competition in a small Iowa town. The film screened on the film festival circuit and was distributed in a limited release. She reunited with Clueless director Amy Heckerling in the independent film Vamps (2012), playing one of two vampires who fall in love and face a choice that could jeopardize their immortality. She was offered the role after Heckerling came to see her in Time Stands Still. Despite a very limited release, Variety found the film to be "a refreshing change of pace [...] with an irresistible cast".

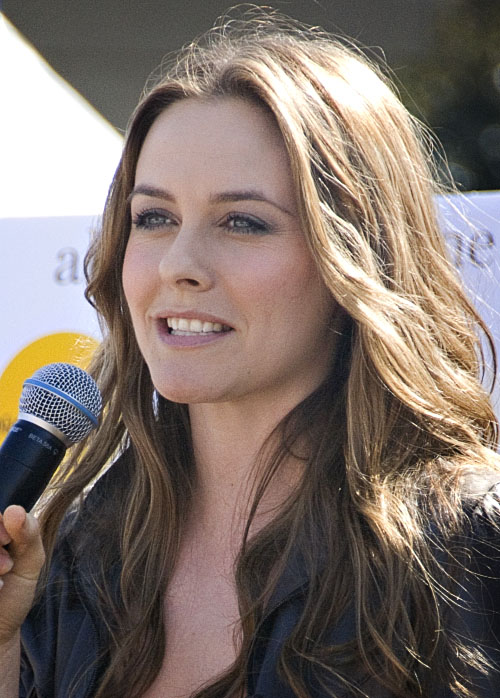
Silverstone speaking at the 2010 Los Angeles Times Festival of Books

Silverstone guest-starred in Childrens Hospital (2011) and obtained a four-episode role in the first season of Suburgatory (2012), reuniting with her Clueless castmate Jeremy Sisto. In 2012, Silverstone returned to Broadway in the production of The Performers, a comedic performance set at the Adult Film Award in Las Vegas. The play premiered in November at the Longacre Theatre, but was canceled after 23 previews and seven regular performances due to the aftermath of Hurricane Sandy. In 2013, she filmed the television pilot HR, which was not picked up, and appeared in the Sundance comedy Ass Backwards, released for VOD and selected theaters. In 2014, Silverstone took on the role of a self-absorbed mother in the rural environment in the coming-of-age drama Angels in Stardust, and her Kind Life follow-up book, The Kind Mama, was published.

In 2015, Silverstone starred in the New York production of Of Good Stock, a play revolving around a group of siblings who gather at their family home for a summer weekend. Entertainment Weekly remarked that she was "magnetic even as an engaged narcissist, ditzy" sister; however, The New York Times felt that her role was "the most cartoonish of the characters and a thankless part for [Silverstone], who tips into comic shrillness here". She appeared in the romantic comedy Who Gets the Dog? (2016), opposite Ryan Kwanten portraying a divorcing couple fighting over custody of their beloved dog. The production went straight to DVD. Her next film appearance was in the independent biographical drama King Cobra (2016), as the mother of gay film actor Brent Corrigan.

In 2016's Catfight, Silverstone played the love interest of an outsider artist having a bitter lifetime rivalry with a wealthy housewife. The black comedy was released for VOD and selected theaters, to largely positive reviews. Silverstone starred in three 2017 films—Diary of a Wimpy Kid: The Long Haul, The Killing of a Sacred Deer, and The Tribes of Palos Verdes—and filmed the television series American Woman in July of that year. On her busy workload, she remarked: "[T]hey were all happening at the same time. Everybody worked together. Yorgos [the Sacred Dee director] helped us to push my date and Diary of a Wimpy Kid held the movie for a week or two for me". The comedy The Long Haul, the fourth film in the Diary of a Wimpy Kid film series, saw her portray the clueless and loving mother of the titular character, replacing Rachael Harris. The film was widely disliked and criticized by critics for the recasting of the main characters and its story development, and while The Long Haul made a modest $40.1 million worldwide, it emerged as Silverstone's most widely seen film since Beauty Shop (2005).

In the psychological thriller The Killing of a Sacred Deer, directed by Yorgos Lanthimos and co-starring Colin Farrell and Nicole Kidman, Silverstone took on the role of a widow and the mother of a mysterious boy who befriends his late father's cardiac surgeon. The film competed for the Palme d'Or at the 70th Cannes Film Festival and was an arthouse success. Casting director Francine Maisler chose Silverstone after seeing her star in a previous play; her two-scene appearance was filmed in one day, and she remarked of the filming: "[I]t was just so wonderful. When you admire something so much, it's a little bit hard to imagine how you fit into it". In the independent coming-of-age drama The Tribes of Palos Verdes, she reunited with her Butter co-star Jennifer Garner, playing a real-estate agent living in Palos Verdes, an affluent, coastal suburb of Los Angeles. The film received a one-theater release by IFC.

Silverstone appeared in the comedy Book Club (2018), opposite Diane Keaton, Jane Fonda and Candice Bergen, playing the "domineering" daughter of a "skittish" widow reading Fifty Shades of Grey. The series American Woman starred Silverstone as a woman discovering her own brand of independence amid the rise of second-wave feminism in the 1970s. It aired for one season on the Paramount Network. To promote the series, she appeared on an episode of Lip Sync Battle with co-star Mena Suvari. She appeared in the horror film The Lodge, which premiered at the 2019 Sundance Film Festival.

=== 2020s ===
In 2020, Silverstone appeared in the comedies Bad Therapy, Sister of the Groom and Valley Girl, and also narrated the eco-superhero fantasy novel Chendell: A Natural Warrior and the Audible podcast Eat S-t Kenny Daniels. She starred as Elizabeth Brewer in the Netflix series The Baby-Sitters Club. In 2021, she appeared in the Netflix series Masters of the Universe: Revelation.

In 2023, she appeared in crime drama thriller Reptile co-starring Benicio del Toro and Justin Timberlake. Her 2024 roles include the A24 film Y2K and Netherlands-produced comedy horror Krazy House. In 2024, Silverstone executive produced the British documentary film I Could Never Go Vegan.

== Activism ==
Silverstone is an animal rights and environmental activist. She became a vegan in 1998 after attending an animal rights meeting, saying, "I realized that I was the problem ... I was an animal lover who was eating animals." She has stated she struggled with childhood vegetarianism: "At eight years old it's hard to stick to your guns—and so through the years I was always starting and stopping trying to be a vegetarian." She has been criticized due to her anti-vaccine stance, promotion of pseudoscientific diet and lifestyle choices, and her claims regarding the medical and spiritual benefits of veganism.

In 2004, Silverstone was voted "Sexiest Female Vegetarian" by PETA. In 2007, she appeared nude in a print advertisement and 30-second commercial for PETA championing vegetarianism; the TV spot was subsequently pulled from the Houston, Texas market by Comcast Cable. In 2016, she posed nude in one of the group's "I'd Rather Go Naked" anti-wool ads. She has set up a sanctuary for rescued pets in Los Angeles. In 2012, during the trial of Russian band Pussy Riot, she wrote a letter to Vladimir Putin asking that vegan meals be made available to all Russian prisoners.

Federal campaign contribution records list Silverstone contributing $500 to Dennis Kucinich's 2004 presidential campaign. She supported Barack Obama's presidential candidacy, and endorsed Senator Bernie Sanders for president in the 2016 U.S. presidential election. In 2023, Silverstone endorsed Robert F. Kennedy Jr. in the 2024 Democratic primaries and announced that she had left the Democratic Party and registered as an Independent. In 2009, she appeared in "A Gaythering Storm", a Funny or Die spoof Internet video parodying anti-same-sex marriage commercial "Gathering Storm". In 2023, Silverstone appeared with her son in a PETA campaign encouraging schools to adopt alternatives to animal dissection.

== Personal life ==
She married her longtime boyfriend, rock musician Christopher Jarecki, in a beachfront ceremony at Lake Tahoe on June 11, 2005. After meeting outside a theater in 1997, they dated for eight years prior to their marriage. They got engaged about a year before their marriage, and Jarecki presented Silverstone with an engagement ring that had belonged to his grandmother. The couple lived in an eco-friendly Los Angeles house that Silverstone bought in 1996, complete with solar panels and an organic vegetable garden and they shared a "menagerie of rescued dogs". On May 5, 2011, Silverstone gave birth to a son. Jarecki and Silverstone separated in February 2018, filed for divorce three months later, and it was finalized in November of that year.

== Filmography ==
=== Film ===
Year	Title	Role	Notes
1993	The Crush	Adrian / Darian Forrester	
1995	Le Nouveau Monde	Trudy Wadd	
1995	Hideaway	Regina Harrison	
1995	Clueless	Cher Horowitz	
1995	The Babysitter	Jennifer	
1996	True Crime	Mary Giordano	
1997	Batman & Robin	Barbara Wilson / Batgirl	
1997	Excess Baggage	Emily Hope	Also uncredited producer
1999	Blast from the Past	Eve Rustikov	
2000	Love's Labour's Lost	The Princess of France	
2002	Global Heresy	Natalie "Nat" Bevin	
2003	Scorched	Sheila Rio	
2004	Scooby-Doo 2: Monsters Unleashed	Heather Jasper Howe	
2005	Beauty Shop	Lynn	
2005	Silence Becomes You	Violet	
2006	Stormbreaker	Jack Starbright	
2008	Tropic Thunder	Herself	Cameo
2011	The Art of Getting By	Ms. Herman	
2011	Butter	Jill Emmet	
2012	Vamps	Goody Rutherford	
2013	Ass Backwards	Laurel Kelly	
2013	Gods Behaving Badly	Kate	
2014	Space Dogs: Adventure to the Moon	Belka	Voice role - English dub
2014	Angels in Stardust	Tammy Russell	
2014	Jungle Shuffle	Sacha	Voice role
2015	The Nutcracker Sweet	Marie Silberhaus	Voice role
2016	King Cobra	Janette Lockhart	
2016	Catfight	Lisa	
2016	Who Gets the Dog?	Olive Greene	
2017	Diary of a Wimpy Kid: The Long Haul	Susan Heffley	
2017	The Killing of a Sacred Deer	Mrs. Lang	
2017	The Tribes of Palos Verdes	Ava	
2018	Book Club	Jill	
2019	The Lodge	Laura Hall	
2019	In the Time It Takes to Get There	Eliza	Short film
2020	Bad Therapy	Susan Howard	
2020	Valley Girl	Older Julie Richman	Uncredited
2020	Sister of the Groom	Audrey	Also executive producer
2022	Scream	Stab-Tatum Riley	Uncredited; photo only
2022	Last Survivors	Henrietta	
2022	The Requin	Jaelyn	
2022	Senior Year	Deanna Russo	
2023	Perpetrator	Hildie Baptiste	
2023	Mustache	Miss Martin	
2023	Reptile	Judy Nichols	
2024	Krazy House	Eva Christian	
2024	Y2K	Robin Lillard	
2024	I Could Never Go Vegan		Executive producer
2024	Gracie & Pedro: Pets to the Rescue	Sissy / Chrissy	Voice role
2025	Pretty Thing	Sophie	
2025	Bugonia	Sandy Gatz	
2025	A Merry Little Ex-Mas	Kate Holden	Also executive producer
TBA	Lizard Music	TBA	Filming

=== Television ===
Year	Title	Role	Notes
1992	The Wonder Years	Jessica Thomas	Episode: "Road Test"
1993	Torch Song	Delphine	TV movie
1993	Scattered Dreams	Phyllis Messenger	TV movie
1994	Rebel Highway	Roslyn	Episode: "Cool and the Crazy"
1994	Cool and the Crazy	Roslyn	TV movie
1998	Wildlife Vet	Herself	Documentary TV movie
2001–2003	Braceface	Sharon Spitz	Voice role, main cast (seasons 1–2); also executive producer
2003	Miss Match	Kate Fox	Main cast
2005	Queen B	Beatrice "Bea"	Unsold pilot; also co-executive producer
2006	Candles on Bay Street	Dee Dee Michaud	TV movie
2006	Pink Collar	Hayden Flynn	Unsold pilot
2006	Getaway	Herself	1 episode
2007	The Singles Table	Georgia	Unaired series, main cast; cancelled by NBC mid-production
2008	The Bad Mother's Handbook	Karen	Unsold pilot
2011	Childrens Hospital	Kelly	Episode: "Munch by Proxy"
2012	Suburgatory	Eden	Recurring role (season 1)
2013	HR	Ellen	Unaired TV movie
2015	Making a Scene with James Franco	Charlotte / Marcy D'Arcy / Janet	3 episodes
2016	The Characters	Herself	Episode: "Kate Berlant"
2017	Jeff & Some Aliens	Alison	Voice role, 3 episodes
2018	American Woman	Bonnie Nolan	Main cast
2018	Lip Sync Battle	Herself	Episode: "Alicia Silverstone vs. Mena Suvari"
2019	Bajillion Dollar Propertie$	Annabelle Shelly	Episode: "Tough Love"
2020–2021	The Baby-Sitters Club	Elizabeth Thomas-Brewer	Main cast
2021	Masters of the Universe	Queen Marlena	Voice role, main cast (Revelation - part 1)
2022	American Horror Stories	Erin	Episode: "Lake"
2025	Irish Blood	Fiona Sharpe	Main cast; also executive producer

=== Music videos ===
Year	Title	Role	Artist
1993	"Cryin'"	Girl	Aerosmith
1993	"Amazing"	Girl	Aerosmith
1994	"Crazy"	Girl #1	Aerosmith
2009	"Her Diamonds"	Frozen girl	Rob Thomas
2011	"Fight for Your Right Revisited"	Café patron	Beastie Boys

== Stage credits ==
Year	Title	Role	Venue	Notes
1993	Carol's Eve	Debbie	MET Theatre	Hollywood, Los Angeles
2002	The Graduate	Elaine Robinson	Plymouth Theatre	Broadway
2006	Boston Marriage	Catherine	Geffen Theater	Westwood, Los Angeles
2007	Speed-the-Plow	Karen	Geffen Theater	Westwood, Los Angeles
2009	Time Stands Still	Mandy	Geffen Theater	Westwood, Los Angeles
2010	Time Stands Still	Mandy	Samuel J. Friedman Theatre	Broadway
2012	The Performers	Sara	Longacre Theatre	Broadway
2015	Of Good Stock	Amy	New York City Center - Stage I	Off-Broadway

== Awards and nominations ==
She was awarded a Heart of Green Award in 2009, which "recognizes individuals, organizations or companies who have helped green go mainstream." In 2010, she was awarded a Voice of Compassion Award by the Physician's Committee For Responsible Medicine for "shining a spotlight on the powerful health benefits of a vegan diet." In 2021, she was nominated for the Daytime Emmy Award for Outstanding Limited Performance in a Children's Program.

Year	Award	Category	Nominations	Result	Ref.
1993	Fangoria Chainsaw Awards	Best Actress	The Crush	Nominated	
1994	MTV Movie & TV Awards	Best Breakthrough Performance	The Crush	Won	
1994	MTV Movie & TV Awards	Best Villain	The Crush	Won	
1994	MTV Movie & TV Awards	Most Desirable Female	The Crush	Nominated	
1994	Young Artist Awards	Best Youth Actress Leading Role in a Motion Picture Drama	The Crush	Nominated	
1995	Bravo Otto	Best Actress		Won	
1995	National Board of Review	Best Breakthrough Performer	Clueless	Won	
1996	American Comedy Awards	Funniest Actress in a Motion Picture (Leading Role)	Clueless	Won	
1996	Blockbuster Entertainment Awards	Favorite Female Newcomer	Clueless	Won	
1996	Chicago Film Critics Association Awards	Most Promising Actress	Clueless	Won	
1996	Nickelodeon Kids' Choice Awards	Favorite Movie Actress	Clueless	Nominated	
1996	MTV Movie & TV Awards	Best Female Performance	Clueless	Won	
1996	MTV Movie & TV Awards	Best Comedic Performance	Clueless	Nominated	
1996	MTV Movie & TV Awards	Most Desirable Female	Clueless	Won	
1996	Young Artist Awards	Best Young Leading Actress – Feature Film	Clueless	Nominated	
1998	Razzie Awards	Worst Actress	Excess Baggage	Nominated	
1998	Razzie Awards	Worst Supporting Actress	Batman & Robin	Won	
1998	Blockbuster Entertainment Awards	Favorite Supporting Actress – Sci-Fi	Batman & Robin	Nominated	
1998	Nickelodeon Kids' Choice Awards	Favorite Movie Actress	Batman & Robin	Won	
2002	Daytime Emmy Awards	Outstanding Performer in an Animated Program	Braceface	Nominated	
2004	Genesis Awards	Children's TV Series	Braceface	Won	
2004	Golden Globes Awards	Best Performance by an Actress in a Television Series – Comedy or Musical	Miss Match	Nominated	
2004	Satellite Awards	Best Actress in a Series, Comedy or Musical	Miss Match	Nominated	
2004	Young Hollywood Awards	Hottest Coolest Young Veteran	Career	Won	
2021	Daytime Emmy Awards	Outstanding Limited Performance in a Children's Program	The Baby-Sitters Club	Nominated	
2022	Children's and Family Emmy Awards	Outstanding Lead Performance in a Preschool, Children's or Young Teen Program	The Baby-Sitters Club	Nominated	
2023	Razzie Awards	Worst Actress	The Requin	Nominated	

== See also ==
- List of vegans
