= Scattered Dreams =

- Genre: Drama
- Written by: Karen Croner
- Directed by: Neema Barnette
- Starring: Gerald McRaney; Tyne Daly; Ed Grady; Rhoda Griffis; Macon McCalman
- Music by: Mark Snow
- Country of origin: United States
- Original language: English

Production
- Executive producer: Robert Greenwald
- Producer: Philip K. Kleinbart
- Cinematography: Yuri Neyman
- Editor: David Beatty
- Running time: 93 minutes
- Production companies: Nasser Group; Robert Greenwald Productions
- Budget: $3,700,000 (estimated)

Original release
- Network: CBS
- Release: December 19, 1993

Scattered Dreams: The Kathryn Messenger Story is a 1993 made for TV drama film based on a true story. It stars Gerald McRaney, Ed Grady, Rhoda Griffis, Tyne Daly and Macon McCalman. Actress Alicia Silverstone also stars. It was directed by Neema Barnette.

== Plot ==
A loving couple trying to make a living in 1951 Florida is arrested for a crime they didn't commit. The pair is given long jail terms and ripped from their children, so they begin a stunning fight for justice that has them facing the ruthless sheriff responsible for their incarceration.

== Production ==
Scattered Dreams is based on a true story. The real life Kathryn Messenger and her husband were arrested in West Palm Beach in 1951. They were each sentenced to jail for 7 years for failing to pay a $258 grocery bill. The children were left behind as wards of the state when the Messengers went to New Orleans- though Kathryn Messenger claimed the children were being held hostage "as revenge."
