= Krazy House (film) =

Dutch comedy film

- Theatrical release poster
- Directed by: Steffen Haars; Flip van der Kuil
- Screenplay by: Steffen Haars; Flip van der Kuil
- Produced by: Maarten Swart
- Starring: Nick Frost; Alicia Silverstone; Kevin Connolly
- Cinematography: Joris Kerbosch
- Edited by: Flip van der Kuil
- Production companies: Kaap Holland Film; XYZ Films
- Distributed by: Splendid Film
- Release dates: January 20, 2024 (Sundance); May 16, 2024 (Netherlands)
- Running time: 90 minutes
- Country: Netherlands
- Languages: English; Dutch
- Box office: $54,332

Krazy House is a 2024 Dutch action horror comedy film written and directed by Steffen Haars and Flip van der Kuil in their Dutch/English-language feature debuts. Shot on location in Amsterdam, the film stars Nick Frost, Kevin Connolly and Alicia Silverstone. Maarten Swart serves as producer for Kaap Holland Films.

== Plot ==
A 1990s sitcom, Krazy House, focuses on the Christian family; devout religious dad and clumsy subservient oaf Bernard 'Bernie' Christian, businesswoman wife Eva Christian, science focused and antagonistic to Bernie's views son Adam Christian, boy-crazed gum swallowing daughter Sarah Christian and their dog Angel. While attempting to cook, Bernie accidentally pops the top off the kitchen sink faucet, causing water to fly everywhere, and pulls off the lever to the water switch. A Russian family consisting of Piotr and his two sons Dmitri and Igor arrive looking for work and Sarah and Adam both become smitten, Sarah with Dmitri and Adam with Igor. Eva is bedridden after injuring her head and told to stay home and relax following a diagnosis of "the burnout" Bernie calls Piotr and his sons.

The Russians begin tearing the house apart and corrupt the family one by one. Sarah and Dmitri form a relationship and begin having sex, Igor convinces Adam to make crystal meth using his chemistry set and Adam becomes addicted after seeing a green alien, and Eva is fired from her job and becomes increasingly angry due to the loud noises of the housework. Bernie catches Dmitri and Sarah having sex and Adam and Igor smoking and is horrified. Eva arrives, revealing she's been told of her firing, and cuts open her arm to the horror of both the family and the studio audience. Eva is given pills which she soon starts taking in larger amounts.

Bernie attempts to tell the Russians to leave but has a disturbing vision where a voice repeats "Kill them all". Bernie runs upstairs and puts his hand above a candlelit flame, saying a prayer while doing so. Bernie asks Jesus Christ what he should do, and once Jesus appears Bernie thanks Jesus even though he doesn't understand the answer given to him. Bernie gathers the family and tries to get them to leave the house and visit their aunt but is met with resistance. A police officer arrives and is promptly killed by Piotr, who declares that he and his sons will only leave once they find what they're looking for. Piotr forces the family into hard labor, during which Eva tells Bernie she no longer loves him and begins to fall for Piotr. Sarah reveals that she's pregnant to Dmitri's shock.

Bernie once again has a conversation with Jesus Christ but becomes angered by Jesus' vague answers. More police arrive at the house due to the hostage situation and while Piotr is distracted, Bernie puts Eva's pills in his vodka, knowing that it will knock him out. Once the Russians are unconscious, Bernie again tries and fails to get the family to leave. Adam and Sarah express their frustration with Bernie and Eva's constant absence, while Eva expresses anger at Bernie before abusing her pill intake. After fighting his violent impulses, Bernie apologizes to Piotr, only to be knocked out and crucified. The rest of the Christians and the Russians then sensually eat sausage together, but Igor is smacked and disowned by Piotr after kissing Adam. Angel emerges from a hidden area and is killed by Piotr; the resulting buckshot causes a hidden stash of money to fly all over the living room.

The FBI arrives and Piotr gives his demands for a plane to Russia. After Igor captures Adam after sorrowfully telling him the green alien will never return, the Russians find what they were looking for, the mummified corpse of Piotr's infant daughter Olga. Piotr recalls that he and his wife, Nadia, pulled off a bank robbery but during the getaway drive Nadia gave birth to Olga. Nadia stashed the money away in the Christians' house but accidentally left Olga in there as well. When going back Nadia was gunned down by Officer Janssen, who declares vengeance on Piotr for killing his partner. Once he's done Piotr reveals that the asbestos bag he had with him contains Nadia's corpse, and begins to make love to it. Bernie is forced to watch in horror as Dmitri angrily hits Sarah and Piotr sexually assaults Eva.

Bernie then has another vision of Jesus, who Bernie claims was the only thing keeping him sane. Initially seeming forgiving, Bernie asks Jesus to help him get off of the cross, but impales Jesus through the head with a spike and breaks free once he hears Eva's cries against Piotr, now fully giving into his violent needs. Fighting off Piotr and Dmitri, Bernie lights Olga's corpse on fire and throws it at Adam's chemistry lab, causing an explosion. The family sorrowfully believes Bernie to have died and are met by the FBI, but are soon held at gunpoint by Piotr and a now reluctant Dmitri. Bernie reveals himself to be alive and a shootout occurs, killing both the FBI and the show's studio audience and crew.

After the fallout Officer Janssen arrives and confronts Piotr only to be promptly killed by Bernie. A weak Piotr tells Bernie that he only has a few weeks left to live and simply wanted to have his entire family with him during his death. Bernie responds by shoving a Jesus figurine up Piotr's anus, and Eva's feelings for Bernie return. Having been previously mortally wounded in the shootout, Igor dies in Dmitri's arms. Adam is seriously injured by a falling stage light but Bernie injects him with a needle to relieve the pain, causing Adam to once again see the green alien, much to his delight. While Dmitri apologizes to Sarah for hitting her, she soon gives birth (orally) to a large piece of gum. Piotr is touched, but Bernie swiftly crushes his head with a large cross. Once everything is settled Eva begins cleaning the destroyed set, and Bernie arrives before the two passionately make out. The rest of the family and Dmitri arrive for a hug, and embrace each other as the credits roll.

== Cast ==
- Nick Frost as Bernard 'Bernie' Christian
- Alicia Silverstone as Eva Christian
- Jan Bijvoet as Piotr Christian
- Gaite Jansen as Sarah Christian
- Walt Klink as Adam Christian
- Chris Peters as Dmitri
- Matti Stooker as Igor
- Kevin Connolly as Jesus
- John Jones as Dr. White
- Jacob Derwig as Officer Janssen
- Victoria Koblenko as Nadia
- Gregory Shapiro as Officer Jack
- Lolu Ajayi as Officer Winslow
- Jaap Hilhorst as Police Officer
- Jules Seegers as Police Officer
- Olly as Angel

== Production ==
=== Development ===
Writer-directors “Steffen & Flip” (Steffen Haars and Flip van der Kuil) co-produced alongside Maarten Swart for Kaap Holland Film who have Jorn Baars serving as executive producer, along with Todd Brown of XYZ Films. Splendid Film handled distribution of the film in the Benelux region. The project had support from the Netherlands Film Production Incentive who revealed in 2020 they had given €526,995 to the project. Additional support came from the Netherlands Film Fund and the Abraham Tuschinski Fund Foundation.

=== Filming ===
Principal photography took place in Amsterdam in mid-January 2022. Filming wrapped prior to XYZ Films taking on North American sales for the film at the European Film Market in February 2023. Lead actor Nick Frost was quoted by Variety as saying the production was a "completely bonkers project to be a part of and I’ve absolutely loved every minute of it." Silverstone told The Hollywood Reporter "I had a ball in Amsterdam, making a film with these amazing interesting filmmakers".

== Release ==
The film premiered in the Midnight section at the Sundance Film Festival on January 20, 2024, and was theatrically released in the Netherlands on May 16, 2024 by Splendid Film.

== Reception ==
On the review aggregator website Rotten Tomatoes, 22% of 18 critics' reviews are positive, with an average rating of 3.9/10. Metacritic, which uses a weighted average, assigned the film a score of 23 out of 100, based on six critics, indicating "generally unfavorable" reviews.

In a negative review, Jordan Mintzer of The Hollywood Reporter wrote, "Krazy House hardly elicits a laugh, even if a sitcom-style laugh track plays throughout the first part of the movie, which was shot to fit the old 4:3 boob tube aspect ratio. When the Russians arrive to wreak havoc and the film expands to widescreen, it becomes so persistent in its pursuit of bad and bawdy humor that it's truly a test to sit through, not because of the gross-out factor but because the jokes are all kind of loud and dumb."

Meagan Navarro of Bloody Disgusting also gave the film a negative review and wrote, "There's a very hyper-specific audience in mind for Krazy House, the type that doesn't mind hollow exercises in shock value and gag-inducing humor without aim. But mostly, Krazy House just feels like a grating marathon of purposeless excess, devoid of effective humor. It somehow makes an 86-minute runtime feel like an absolute slog. The equivalent of nails on a chalkboard."
