= Macon McCalman =

American actor

- Born: Willis Macon McCalman; December 30, 1932; Memphis, Tennessee, U.S.
- Died: November 29, 2005 (aged 72); Memphis, Tennessee, U.S.
- Other names: Sonny McCalman; Macon MacCalman
- Occupation: Actor
- Years active: 1971–1997

Willis Macon McCalman (December 30, 1932 – November 29, 2005) was an American television, stage and big screen movie actor.

== Acting career ==
Nicknamed "Sonny", McCalman helped form the Front Street Theatre in his hometown of Memphis, Tennessee. During the Korean War, he served in the U.S. Army. Over the course of his acting career McCalman appeared in various film and TV guest roles, usually in supporting parts, both dramatic and comedic often as heavies and authoritarian figures. He got his acting start on Broadway appearing in productions of The Last of Mrs. Lincoln (1971), An Enemy for the People (1971), and a comedy, The Playboy Of the Western World.

His first Hollywood film role was in Deliverance (1972). He had supporting parts in The Concorde... Airport '79 (1979), The Falcon and the Snowman (1985), Fried Green Tomatoes (1991), and Falling Down (1993). He also appeared in the Roger Donaldson directed film Marie (1985). He appeared in guest roles in television shows such as Cheers, Starsky and Hutch, Kojak, Lou Grant, Three's Company, Murder She Wrote as well as such miniseries and television movies as Roots (1977) and Captains and the Kings (1976).

== Death ==
McCalman retired from acting and returned to Memphis in 1997 after suffering a heart attack. He died in a Memphis hospital in 2005, aged 72, from complications of a series of strokes.

== Filmography ==
=== Film ===
- Deliverance (1972) – Deputy Queen
- Lipstick (1976) – Police Photographer
- Slap Shot (1977) – Soap Opera patient (uncredited)
- Smokey and the Bandit (1977) – Mr. B
- Comes a Horseman (1978) – Virgil Hoverton
- The Concorde... Airport '79 (1979) – Carl Parker
- The Last Word (1979) – Welfare Caseworker
- The Incredible Shrinking Woman (1981) – Dr. Atkins
- Dead & Buried (1981) – Ben
- Carbon Copy (1981) – Tubby Wederholt
- Rollover (1981) – Jerry Fewster
- Timerider: The Adventure of Lyle Swann (1982) – Dr. Sam
- Honkytonk Man (1982) – Dr. Hines
- Fleshburn (1984) – Earl Dana
- The Falcon and the Snowman (1985) – Larry Rogers
- Cold Feet (1989) – Store Owner
- Doc Hollywood (1991) – Aubrey Draper
- Fried Green Tomatoes (1991) – Prosecutor Percy
- Falling Down (1993) – Detective Graham
- Murder Between Friends (1994) – Janet’s Lawyer
- The Client (1994) – Ballatine
- A Walk in the Clouds (1995) – Conductor
- Rosewood (1997) – Governor Hardee (final film role)

=== Television ===
- Starsky & Hutch (1975) – Officer Bernie Glassman
- Kojak (1976) – McKee
- The Jeffersons (1976) (TV) – Roger Tulley
- Captains and the Kings (1976; TV miniseries) – Dolan
- The Bob Newhart Show (1977) – Dr. Malcolm
- Maude (1977) – Mark Duncan / Wendall Glendale
- Carter Country (1977) – Drunk
- Roots (1977; TV miniseries) – Poston
- The Pirate (1978; TV miniseries) – Hutchinson
- Three's Company (1979) – Mr. Penrose
- Hart to Hart (1979) – Dr. Harry Capello
- The Waltons (1979-1980) – Deputy Sheriff / Deputy Abe
- Three's Company (1981) – Roland Wood
- Lou Grant (1981-1982) – Dolph Masterson / Kibbee
- Diff'rent Strokes (1981-1983) – Dr. Kalsa / George Endicott
- Cheers (1982) – Darrell Stabell
- Three's Company (1983) – Roland Wood
- Remington Steele (1983) – Uncle Tim
- Gloria (1983) – Motel Manager
- Emerald Point N.A.S. (1983) – Harry Bogard
- St. Elsewhere (1984) – Henry Judson
- Newhart (1984) – Paul Frazier
- The Red-Light Sting (1984) – Jeffers
- Hill Street Blues (1984) – Mr. Fitzgerald
- Knight Rider (1985) – Calvin Holmes
- Family Ties (1986) – Professor Spanos
- The Deliberate Stranger (1986) – Larsen's editor
- Hunter (1987)
- Silver Spoons (1987) – Stockwell
- Dallas (1987) – Gorman
- Murder, She Wrote (1987–1991) – Nolan Hayes / Hotel Detective Fritz Rice
- Duet (1988) – Mr. Paxton
- Perfect Strangers (1989) – Dr. Shukin
- Guns of Paradise (1989) – Warren Turtle
- L.A. Law (1989–1991) – Judge Whitney Baldwin
- Designing Women (1989) – Paul Webster
- Frankenstein: The College Years (1991) – Dean March
- The Fresh Prince of Bel-Air (1992) – Dr. Baylor
- Scattered Dreams (1993) – Virgil
- The Wonder Years (1993) – Karl Gustafson
- Lois & Clark: The New Adventures of Superman (1994) – Willie
- Goode Behavior (1996) – Mr. Kaufman
