= Carol's Eve =

Play by Pauline Lepor, first staged in 1993

Carol's Eve is a 1993 comedy/drama play directed by Valerie Mayhew and written by Pauline Lepor.

The initial production starred Devora Millman, Richard Robert Redlin, Lesa Carlson, Allen Garfield, Boyd Jeffries, Barry Schwartz and Alicia Silverstone. The play was produced by Christine Redlin and Richard Robert Redlin at The MET Theatre in Hollywood, California.

The play is set at an office party on Christmas Eve, which is also Carol's (Devora Millman) 30th birthday. Carol's intended suicide attempt, from the balcony of an L.A. high-rise, is stopped when a stream of partygoers visit the terrace. The conflict begins when Carol meets Michael (R. Robert Redlin), the latter a former biker, now an unrelenting New Ager, who has experienced death when from an accident resulted in his coma.

Alicia Silverstone starred as Debbie, a desperate coke-addicted lesbian.
