= Christopher Jarecki =

American musician

- Born: December 25, 1976 (age 49)
- Occupation: Musician
- Years active: 2000–present
- Spouse: Alicia Silverstone (m. 2005; div. 2018)
- Children: 1
- Musical career
- Formerly of: S.T.U.N.

Christopher Jarecki (born December 25, 1976) is an American musician. He is best known for his work as the frontman for the band S.T.U.N.

== Career ==
Jarecki was the singer for S.T.U.N., who toured with Jane's Addiction, the Used, Marilyn Manson and the Warped Tour and played at the Coachella Valley Music and Arts Festival. The band's name stood for "Scream Towards the Uprising of Noncomformity." The political noise-punk group was also named an “Artist to Watch” by Rolling Stone magazine and MTV. He also leads the Los Angeles-based group the Bathroom Murders, which released their first album, Anarchiso, in June 2009.

Jarecki currently hosts his own radio show, A Musical Journey with Christopher Jarecki, where his special guests discuss five songs that reflect their personal musical history. The radio show was broadcast through GTFU radio.

== Personal life ==
Jarecki married actress Alicia Silverstone on June 11, 2005 in Lake Tahoe, California. Jarecki is a vegan. He coaches youth basketball and advocates for animal rights. Jarecki and Silverstone had four rescue dogs. In January 2011, it was announced that Jarecki and Silverstone were expecting their first child together. In May 2011, Silverstone gave birth to a boy, Bear Blu. Jarecki and Silverstone separated after 13 years of marriage in February 2018. In May 2018, the couple filed for divorce. In November 2018, the divorce was finalized.
