= The Kind Diet =

Book by Alicia Silverstone

- Author: Alicia Silverstone
- Subject: Vegan cooking
- Published: 2009
- Pages: 308 pp.
- ISBN: 978-1-60529-644-9
- OCLC: 316019572

The Kind Diet: A Simple Guide to Feeling Great, Losing Weight and Saving the Planet is a 2009 vegan cookbook written by actress and animal rights activist Alicia Silverstone.

Silverstone told New York Times interviewer Patrick Healy that for three years she has turned down roles in films and television to have time to work on her book, as well as do plays.

A follow-up book was published in 2014, The Kind Mama.
