= Wildlife Vet =

Wild!Life Adventures: Wildlife Vet is a 1998 Made-for-TV documentary film directed by Larry Engel. It composed by Marc Engel and story editor was Whitney Wood. It stars Alicia Silverstone and veterinarian Dave Jessup. In this 60-minute longer documentary, Silverstone joins Jessup as he treats animal ailments in Zimbabwe and also in California.
