= Gathering Storm (advertisement) =

2009 American television advertisement

In 2009, the National Organization for Marriage launched a $1.5 million ad campaign targeted at five states where same-sex marriage was being debated using a 60-second video entitled "Gathering Storm". In the advertisement, a series of actors set against a backdrop of clouds and lightning speak about the ways that "gay marriage" activism has cut into freedom of religion and parental rights.

== Background ==
The ad aired after California's Proposition 8, eliminating the right of same-sex couples to marry, passed in public election after having been behind in the polls. During the run-up to the vote, an advertisement aired saying schoolchildren would be taught about gay marriage should the proposition fail. "Gathering Storm" targeted Iowa, New Hampshire, New York, New Jersey, Maine and Rhode Island.

== Content ==
The actors in the ad (who are described as actors in on-screen text; many were Mormon activists) mention the following cases:

1. A California doctor who is forced to choose between her religious faith and her work;
2. A member of a New Jersey church group which is punished by the state for opposing same-sex marriage;
3. A Massachusetts parent who is unable to prevent the state from teaching her children that same-sex marriage is appropriate;

The first actor refers to the Benitez case, where an unmarried lesbian sued a fertility clinic under California's Civil Rights Act for declining to artificially inseminate her. The clinic's doctors argued that the Act was unconstitutional insofar as it required them to perform procedures in violation of their religious beliefs. The California Supreme Court ruled that the Civil Rights Act did not violate the free exercise clauses of the United States Constitution or the California Constitution.

The second actor refers to an Ocean Grove, NJ controversy, in which the Methodist Ocean Grove Camp Meeting Association refused a lesbian couple use of a pavilion for a civil union ceremony. The state ruled that the group could not receive a tax exemption for the pavilion under the state's Green Acres Program, which is intended to encourage availability of property for public use. The Association's beachfront property other than the pavilion itself retained the tax exemption. The Association was assessed approximately $20,000 in back taxes on the pavilion, and was the subject of two related civil rights complaints.

The third actor refers to the Lexington, Massachusetts Parker case, in which parents sued for the right to exclude their children from public school discussions relating to same-sex marriage. The lawsuit was filed after the son of one set of plaintiffs "brought home a book as part of the diversity book bag from his Estabrook Elementary kindergarten class in 2005 [that] showed various family types including a same-sex-headed household." Another set of plaintiffs' first-grade son was in class when the book King & King, in which a prince marries another prince, was read aloud. One of the plaintiff parents attended a school board meeting to request that he be notified anytime homosexuality was brought up in his son's class; after that request was declined, the parent refused to leave the building and was jailed overnight. The school board later obtained a restraining order barring the parent from entering onto school property. Judge Mark L. Wolf of Federal District Court found against the plaintiffs, stating in his decision that schools are "entitled to teach anything that is reasonably related to the goals of preparing students to become engaged and productive citizens"; federal courts did not overturn the decision on appeal.

== Reaction ==
The Human Rights Campaign, a lesbian, gay, bisexual, and transgender (LGBT) lobbying group and political action committee, described the ad saying that in it "actors make disproven claims about marriage for lesbian and gay couples."

New York Times columnist Frank Rich described the ad as "an Internet camp classic". It was parodied by Stephen Colbert, the website Funny or Die (using actors Jane Lynch, George Takei, Sarah Chalke, Lance Bass, Sophia Bush and Alicia Silverstone), and in the Futurama episode "Proposition Infinity". Maggie Gallagher, president of NOM when the ad ran, stated appreciation for the parodies and said that "the controversy has helped spread our message."
