= Who Gets the Dog? (2016 film) =

2016 film directed by Huck Botko

- Film poster
- Directed by: Huck Botko
- Written by: Matt Wheeler; Rick Rapoza
- Produced by: Reid Brody; Bill Ryan; Scott Silver
- Starring: Alicia Silverstone; Ryan Kwanten
- Cinematography: Joseph White
- Edited by: Julie Garcés
- Music by: Andrew Dost
- Production companies: Samuel Goldwyn Films; 2DS Productions; Epic Pictures Group
- Distributed by: 20th Century Fox Home Entertainment
- Release date: September 13, 2016
- Running time: 95 minutes
- Country: United States
- Language: English

Who Gets the Dog? is a 2016 American romantic comedy film directed by Huck Botko, from a screenplay by Matt Wheeler and Rick Rapoza. The film stars Alicia Silverstone and Ryan Kwanten as a divorcing couple.

== Plot ==
The film centres on a divorcing couple, Dr Olive Greene (Alicia Silverstone) and Clay Lonergan (Ryan Kwanten), a professional ice hockey player. Both want custody of their beloved dog Wesley.

The dog, a golden Labrador Retriever, is the centre of this couple's universe. When Olive gets tired of Clay's immaturity she throws him out of the matrimonial home. Clay moves to a trailer down by the lake in the woods.

They take Wesley to a dog psychologist, who says the dog needs discipline. Olive goes to a dog trainer, Glenn, who quickly controls Wesley and asks Olive out on a date.

While Clay has Wesley at his trailer he attempts to make a video with the help of his best friend, Rhett, but the video shows how undisciplined the dog is.

After another visit to the pet psychologist, the couple attempt to reconcile, but Glenn drops in unannounced and tells Clay he and Olive are dating.

Clay wants Olive back and tries to woo her at a street festival. Glenn intervenes and gets in a scuffle with Clay and Olive has to separate the two. She is not impressed with Clay's behaviour.

At their final court appearance, the adoption papers are presented and the judge rules in Clay's favour.

Clay gets promoted to the big league but at the same time, his dog wanders off and goes missing. He calls Olive to help search for the dog, who is finally found in a homeless shelter with some hobos.

During Clay's first game he gets injured and gets his best friend to return the dog to Olive. Olive visits Clay in the hospital and they kiss.

They reconcile in the end and decide to stop the divorce proceedings. They later have a baby.

== Cast ==
- Alicia Silverstone as Olive Greene
- Ryan Kwanten as Clay Lonnergan
- Randall Batinkoff as Glenn Hannon
- Matty Ryan as Rhett
- Rachel Cerda as Libby
- Amy J. Carle as Dr. Wendy
- Devin Bethea as Koji
- Kat as Wesley

== Production ==
The film was shot in Chicago in February 2015. Scenes were shot during a real Chicago Wolves game at the Allstate Arena.

== Release ==
The film was released on DVD, Blu-ray, Digital HD, and VOD platforms on September 13, 2016, by 20th Century Fox Home Entertainment.
