= Proposition Infinity =

- Futurama episode
- Episode no.: Season 6 Episode 4
- Directed by: Crystal Chesney-Thompson
- Written by: Michael Rowe
- Production code: 6ACV04
- Original air date: July 8, 2010

Guest appearance
- George Takei as himself

Episode features
- Opening caption: Dictated but not read

Episode chronology
← Previous "Attack of the Killer App"	Next → "The Duh-Vinci Code"
- Futurama season 6

"Proposition Infinity" ("Proposition ∞") is the fourth episode in the sixth season of the American animated television series Futurama, and the 92nd episode of the series overall. It originally aired on Comedy Central in the United States on July 8, 2010. In the episode, Amy Wong and Bender fall in love and begin a culturally taboo robosexual relationship. After facing anti-robosexual sentiments from society, they elect to get married and advocate to legalize robosexual marriage through "Proposition Infinity".

The episode was written by Michael Rowe and directed by Crystal Chesney-Thompson. "Proposition Infinity" served as a satire of the controversy over same-sex marriage and California Proposition 8 (generally referred to as "Proposition 8"), which banned same-sex marriage in California in November 2008. The title of the episode is derived from Proposition 8, turning the 8 sideways to create the symbol for infinity (∞), hence "Proposition ∞". Though the episode satirizes arguments for same-sex marriage, it leans favorably toward the idea of allowing same-sex marriage. The theme of the episode revisits the social taboo of robosexual relationships presented in earlier episodes "Space Pilot 3000" and "I Dated a Robot". Openly gay actor George Takei of Star Trek fame, who married his partner in California during the debate over Proposition 8, returns as a guest star in the series.

"Proposition Infinity" received mostly positive reviews from critics. Co-creator David X. Cohen named it as one of his favorite episodes of the sixth season.

== Plot ==
While bailing Bender out of jail after he was arrested for vandalism, Amy flirts with several inmates. Infuriated at her obsession with "bad boys", Kif breaks up with her. The break-up severely upsets Amy, and to make her feel better, Leela, Fry, and Bender take her to Forbidden Planet Hollywood. Bender mocks Amy all night, insulting and infuriating her, but this leads the two to have sex because of her interest in "bad boys". After this, Amy and Bender discover a mutual attraction for each other and enter into a "robosexual" relationship, which is taboo in the 31st century. Because it is frowned upon, they keep quiet about their relationship, even to their friends and co-workers. The co-workers grow suspicious, but think little of it.

However, during a mission, Amy and Bender are discovered cuddling together. Professor Farnsworth immediately disapproves of this, but the rest of the crew accepts Bender and Amy's relationship. Knowing that Amy's family would disapprove, Farnsworth immediately informs Amy's parents and then calls Reverend Preacherbot to send Bender to a robosexual rehabilitation camp. While at her parents' ranch, where her parents continuously introduce her to non-robot suitors, Amy is saved by Fry, who poses as her new non-robot beau to get her parents off her back. The crew then rescues Bender from the rehabilitation camp.

At the Planet Express building, Bender proposes to Amy. When Farnsworth reminds them that robosexual marriage is illegal in New New York, Bender and Amy launch a campaign for the legalization of robosexual marriage, called "Proposition Infinity" ("Proposition ∞"). As the proposition slumps in the polls days before the election, Bender aims to win his upcoming debate against Farnsworth, the leader of the Proposition Infinity opposition. At the debate (moderated by the head of George Takei) Bender gives a heartfelt speech, which the audience applauds. Farnsworth follows with his rebuttal, relaying a story from his past where he was in love with a fellow scientist named Eunice whom he later discovered in bed with a robot, breaking his heart and leading to his hatred of robosexuals. When Amy points out how weak his argument is, Farnsworth accidentally admits that Eunice was actually a robot named Unit 47 whom he caught in bed with another robot. After admitting the truth, he withdraws his argument and concedes to Amy and Bender.

The next day, Proposition Infinity is approved. Amy is ecstatic, but Bender quickly dumps her when he realizes marriage means that he must be monogamous. Amy is dejected, but Kif wins back her heart by adopting a bad boy persona and the two ride off together on a motorcycle.

== Production ==
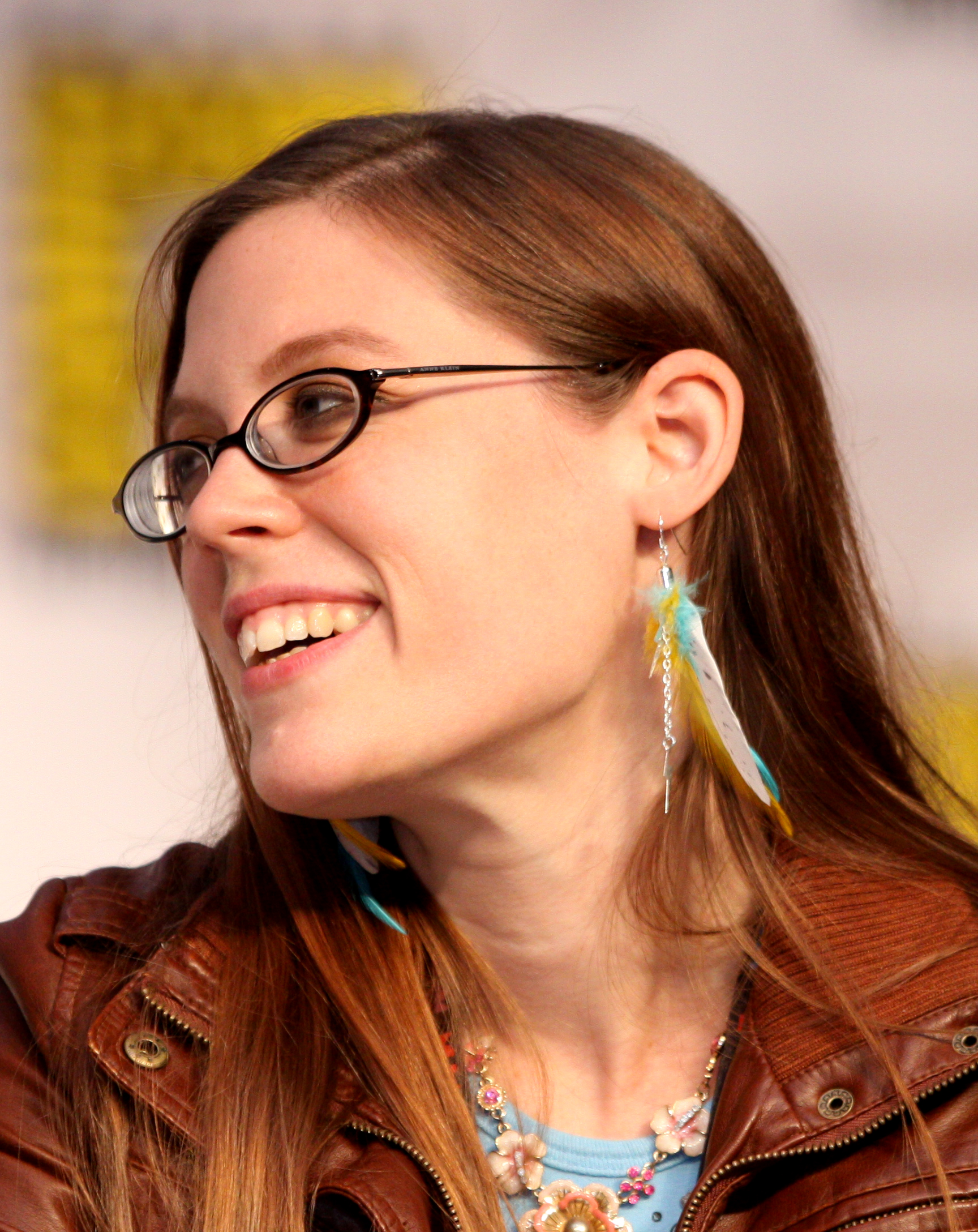
Crystal Chesney-Thompson directed the episode.

The episode was inspired by the controversy that arose from California Proposition 8 in the United States during 2008 and was written by Michael Rowe. The episode was directed by Crystal Chesney-Thompson. George Takei returns as a guest star, voicing himself.

According to Cohen, the writing team's approach when using pop culture references as an episode's main subject is to modify them into futuristic versions to avoid being dated, noting that being a science fiction show, "some topics are probably not going to be around by the time the show airs." In particular, with "Proposition Infinity", they paid specific attention to developing the plot in a way that would "history-proof" the episode and avoid being over-politicized or "preachy." When taking on "real" social issues in the show, Cohen stated that one of their methods of keeping controversy from overwhelming the episode is to "futurize" issues until the audience is unlikely to have developed a strong opinion one way or another about the presented conflict. This was the method used for "Proposition Infinity", as the team felt that most viewers would not have a strong opinion for or against robot and human intermarriage, thus lightening the potentially polarizing nature of the source material.

== Theme and cultural references ==
The 2009 National Organization for Marriage (NOM) "Gathering Storm" advertisement (top); Futurama's "No on Infinity" advertisement (bottom).

"Proposition Infinity" was inspired by the political battle over California Proposition 8 in the United States and heavily satirizes the controversy over same-sex marriage. The title is a reference to California Proposition 8 with the "8" sideways, thus becoming the symbol of infinity (∞). The camp where Bender is being reprogrammed parodies conversion therapy camps for homosexuals. The episode also satirizes the people against same-sex marriage, and in particular, the National Organization for Marriage (NOM); the episode depicts an anti-Proposition Infinity advertisement ("No on Infinity"), which is a direct parody of NOM's 2009 "Gathering Storm" campaign. Many of the jokes in the episode were inspired by the actual vote regarding Proposition 8 and similar legislative debates over same-sex marriage throughout the United States, with several critics noting that the episode was favorable toward same-sex marriage.

Openly gay actor George Takei guest stars in this episode, moderating the Proposition Infinity debate. Takei, a frequent guest star in the series, is an outspoken LGBT activist and marriage equality spokesperson. Takei married his partner, Brad Altman, on June 17, 2008 when same-sex marriage was legal in California. Despite the passing of Proposition 8 in November of that same year, which banned same-sex marriage in California, the California Supreme Court ruled that it did not affect same-sex marriages entered into before its passing, leaving Takei and Altman's marriage still legal and valid.

The episode revisits the concept of robosexuality as a social taboo in the future society depicted in Futurama and is more explicit in its analogy to prejudice and stigma surrounding homosexuality. The stigmatization of robosexuality and the term "robosexual" were first mentioned in the series pilot "Space Pilot 3000". The issue is expanded upon in more detail in the season 3 episode "I Dated a Robot" in which Fry dates a robot Lucy Liu, to the disapproval of the other characters. Co-producer David X. Cohen noted that the writing team had tried to maintain robosexual relationships as a taboo throughout the series.

== Broadcast and reception ==
"Proposition Infinity" originally aired July 8, 2010, on Comedy Central. In its original American broadcast, "Proposition Infinity" was viewed by an estimated 2.013 million households with a 1.3 rating/2% share in the Nielsen ratings and a 1.0 rating/3% share in the 18–49 demographic, going down one-tenth of a point from the previous week's episode, "Attack of the Killer App". In interviews leading up to the premiere of season six, David X. Cohen stated that he considers this one of his favorite episodes of Futurama's sixth season.

"Proposition Infinity" received mostly positive reviews from critics. Zack Handlen of The A.V. Club wrote: "This is the series I've been missing for years. It was goofy, spastic, over-stuffed, occasionally cruel, and bizarrely sincere." He graded the episode A−, praising the "No on Infinity" ad parody and reappearances of George Takei and Hedonismbot in particular. Sean Gandert of Paste wrote: "I'd like to see them lay off the contemporary commentary episodes for a bit, but other than that it was exactly what any fan of the show would hope for." Danny Gallagher of TVSquad stated that the episode's "robotic take on the needless hysteria and blatant hypocricy [sic] of gay marriage was not only steeped in satiric goodness, but it was downright hilarious." He felt that the episode's writing was an improvement over the previous episodes in the season and that it "really used the storied and rich history of the characters to its advantage." In particular, Gallagher praised Takei's cameo as one of the episode's funniest, even stating it to be one of the series' best. Alasdair Wilkins of io9 also praised the episode, calling it "a triumph for the new Futurama, and just the sort of episode that leaves me convinced that the show's revival was completely worthwhile." Michelle Castillo of Today enjoyed the attack on California Proposition 8, stating that the episode "poked fun at the issues in the unique way that only 'Futurama' can pull off."

Robert Canning of IGN gave the episode a more mixed review, stating that he felt the relationship between Bender and Amy was only used to serve the purposes of the story and felt unnatural compared to the relationship between Fry and the Lucy Liu-bot in the similarly themed season 3 episode "I Dated a Robot". He found the jokes funny, stating that they "delivered plenty of hilarious observations regarding gay marriage and the movements surrounding it, but the story was incredibly hollow."

== See also ==
- California Proposition 8 (2008)
- Same-sex marriage in the United States
