= A Head in the Polls =

- Futurama episode
- Episode no.: Season 2 Episode 3
- Directed by: Bret Haaland
- Written by: J. Stewart Burns
- Production code: 2ACV03
- Original air date: December 12, 1999

Guest appearance
- Claudia Schiffer as herself

Episode features
- Opening caption: From The Makers Of Futurama
- Opening cartoon: "Ko-Ko Needles the Boss" (1927)

Episode chronology
← Previous "Brannigan, Begin Again"	Next → "Xmas Story"
- Futurama season 2

"A Head in the Polls" is the third episode in the second season of the American animated television series Futurama, and the 16th episode of the series overall. It originally aired on the Fox network in the United States on December 12, 1999. The episode was written by J. Stewart Burns and directed by Bret Haaland. Claudia Schiffer makes a guest appearance as herself. The title is a pun on the common phrase "Ahead in the polls".

== Plot ==
The election race for President of Earth is in full swing, with two identical clones as the only candidates. Leela, appalled by the apathy of the Planet Express crew, exhorts them to register to vote. Meanwhile, a mining disaster sends the price of titanium through the roof, and Bender seizes the opportunity to make a quick buck by pawning his 40% titanium body.

As a head with a pile of cash, Bender begins enjoying his new lifestyle. During a trip to the Hall of presidents in the New New York Head Museum, Richard Nixon's head ruins Bender's illusions about the glamour of a life without a body. The next day Bender heads off to the pawn shop to retrieve his body, but it has been sold. Later, Nixon's head announces its candidacy for President of Earth, using Bender's body to escape a constitutional provision that "nobody can be elected more than twice".

Fry, Leela, and Bender take off to Washington, D.C. to stop Nixon and recover Bender's body. Directly confronting Nixon fails to recover Bender's body, so the crew infiltrates Nixon's room at the Watergate Hotel. Leela successfully separates the sleeping head from the robot body, but Fry accidentally wakes Nixon. Confronting the intruders, Nixon begins ranting about his future plans for Earth, such as breaking into people's homes and selling their children's organs to zoos. However, Bender records the conversation and knowing that the tape would ruin his election chances if released, Nixon trades the body for the tape.

On Election Day, Nixon wins by a single vote. He regained the robot vote by replacing Bender's body with a giant war robot. Meanwhile, Leela and Fry forgot to vote against him. The episode ends with Nixon on a rampage and crashing through the exterior walls of the White House.

== Continuity ==
Nixon's head would continue to be president throughout the series and into the four direct-to-video feature films. However, he does not use the superbot body he had at the end of the episode ever again. The episode features the first appearance of the recurring Brain Slugs.

== Cultural references ==
The head of Richard Nixon is elected as the President of Earth in this episode

This episode is the first to heavily feature the character of Richard Nixon's head. Although Nixon is often remembered only as "Tricky Dick" the writers for this episode not only mocked his "ruthless drive" but also showed his resilience and relevance.

The episode contains numerous references to Richard Nixon's political career. In addition to part of it taking place at the Watergate Hotel:

- During his rampage Nixon shouts "Who's kicking who around now?", a reference to the famous statement he made after he lost the 1962 gubernatorial race in California: "You won't have Dick Nixon to kick around anymore. Because, gentlemen, this is my last press conference."
- Nixon makes a reference to his dog Checkers, the subject of a 1952 speech, whose head is seen in another jar.
- Bender's mention of audio tape references the use of recorded conversations in the Watergate investigation. Nixon's anguished cry of "Expletive deleted!" refers to the editing of transcripts of those tapes, in which Nixon casually and frequently used obscene language.
- Nixon refers to Gerald Ford (whose head is seen earlier in the episode) as a pardon-granting "sissy", in light of Ford's blanket pardon of Nixon for all Watergate-related charges.
- During the episode Leela says that they give you a discount room at the Watergate Hotel if you've been there before. This is a reference to the infamous Watergate scandal; though strictly speaking Nixon wasn't physically inside the Watergate Hotel during the incident.
- Nixon says "I am not a crook's head!", a reference to his famous "I am not a crook" speech during the Watergate scandal. He does so while holding up his hands in two V-signs, a gesture he used several times during his presidency to represent victory.

There are several references made when they visit the Head Museum's Hall of presidents. The head of Bill Clinton flirts with Leela, saying "You know, legally, nothing I can do counts as sex anymore," a reference to the Clinton-Lewinsky scandal and Clinton's haggling over the definition of "sexual relations". The head of Gerald Ford says that he "never found voting to be all that essential to the process," a reference to the fact that Ford was the only American president who was never elected president or elected vice president.

This episode also showcases the show-within-a-show The Scary Door, a parody of The Twilight Zone featured in multiple episodes. At the beginning of this episode the classic Twilight Zone episode "Time Enough at Last" is spoofed.

Next to the Washington Monument a similarly shaped but larger "Clinton Monument" is seen.

The scene where Bender's head uses a remote-controlled car to travel around Planet Express headquarters is reminiscent of the introductory sequence of Bobby's World.

== Appearances in other media ==
A sample from this episode was used in the Devin Townsend song "Bend It Like Bender!" from his album, Addicted. It features Bender saying "Game's over losers, I have all the money".
