= In-A-Gadda-Da-Leela =

- Futurama episode
- Episode no.: Season 6 Episode 2
- Directed by: Dwayne Carey-Hill
- Story by: Matt Groening; Carolyn Premish
- Teleplay by: Carolyn Premish
- Production code: 6ACV02
- Original air date: June 24, 2010

Guest appearance
- Chris Elliott as V-Giny

Episode features
- Opening caption: Apply directly to the eyes

Episode chronology
← Previous "Rebirth"	Next → "Attack of the Killer App"
- Futurama season 6

"In-A-Gadda-Da-Leela" is the second episode in the sixth season of the American animated television series Futurama, and the 90th episode of the series overall. It originally aired directly after "Rebirth" on June 24, 2010 on Comedy Central. In the episode, Zapp Brannigan and Leela end up on a Garden of Eden-like world after fighting a planet-destroying satellite called V-Giny.

The episode was written by Carolyn Premish, who created the story for the episode with series creator Matt Groening. Dwayne Carey-Hill directed. It features references to Adam and Eve, and Matt Groening's other show, The Simpsons, along with self-parody. The episode received positive reviews from critics.

Notably, "In-A-Gadda-Da-Leela" is the first of several episodes to use a significantly shortened intro sequence this season, and consequently is the first episode in the series not to show a brief clip of a classic cartoon before the opening credits.

== Plot ==
Sometime in the 31st century, a death sphere appears, destroying planets in its path. Professor Farnsworth soon discovers that the death sphere is headed for Earth. After running several simulations, he realizes that the death sphere is the result of a collision between two artificial satellites that were launched into Earth's orbit in 1998. One satellite, launched by the U.S. Federal Communications Commission (FCC), was known as the "V-chip" which censors inappropriate programs like The Pimpsons and Assarama, and the other satellite was called the "USAF Flying Destiny." Shortly after launch, the two mysteriously disappeared. The collision effectively created the death sphere and also gave the death sphere the name "V-GINY," a portmanteau of the two former satellites' names. The death sphere's purpose is later revealed as censoring indecent planets, thereby destroying them.

Zapp Brannigan and Leela are sent to destroy the death sphere in an undetectable one-man craft built by Farnsworth. Upon confronting the sphere's control center, Leela utters "holy cr—", triggering the censor, which sends a black, crude oil-like substance towards them. Their counterattack weaponry proves to be ineffective against the mysterious substance, forcing the duo to retreat. They end up stranded on a Garden of Eden-like planet (complete with a talking serpent, though Brannigan dismisses this as a hallucination) where Brannigan tries to woo Leela through deceit and purposely leaving her trapped and mentally addled. However, Brannigan ultimately scammed Leela; the two really landed on Earth.

In the meantime, the Planet Express crew travels to Lo'ihi Island in Hawaii, the one spot where humanity has not made its mark. There, they desperately attempt to convince the death sphere that there is still some decency on Earth by performing a purity chant. However, Bender cannot keep to himself and begins fornicating with the satellite encoder.

Following the incident, Fry wanders the island in search of a good spot to "take a dump". As he wanders, he finds the stranded Leela, at which point V-Giny appears on Earth, and in a bargain made between it and the Planet Express crew, agrees to spare the planet if "Adam" (Brannigan) and "Eve" (Leela) consummate their relationship. Brannigan tries to bargain his way out due to the uncomfortable setting but Leela forces him into it, which causes Fry a great deal of grief, and he begs for it to be censored. V-Giny states that it is "approved for all audiences" and leaves Earth.

== Production ==
By August 20, 2009, the writing of this episode was ready for its table reading. This episode and the fourth episode of the sixth season feature some coarser language that would previously not have been possible on FOX. The episode's screenplay was written by Carolyn Premish, with the story written by her and Futurama creator, Matt Groening.

This episode had to be toned down when it aired on Sinclair Broadcasting affiliates, but it still kept a TV-14 rating for suggestive dialogue (D), offensive language (L), sexual situations (S), and violence (V).

== Cultural references ==
The episode title itself is a spoof of Iron Butterfly's 1968 song "In-A-Gadda-Da-Vida" (originally titled "In the Garden of Eden"). The episode makes references to the typical 1950s B-Movie serials with Zapp Brannigan's dreams. Zapp and Leela are in an Adam and Eve type planet and take on the roles while on the planet. The Death Sphere is a reference to "Death Star" in Star Wars, its creation and its name are a reference to V′Ger in Star Trek: The Motion Picture. It is also a reference to the Star Trek: The Original Series episodes "The Changeling" (in reference to the fact that the V-chip and the USAF Flying Destiny colliding like the Nomad probe) and "The Doomsday Machine" (an ancient military starship that has gone rogue and destroyed several planets, before heading toward the Federation). Hermes uses a reference database called Janeway's Guide, a portmanteau of Janes Fighting Ships and Kathryn Janeway.

The main plot line of the episode, involving a "Death Sphere" on a course to destroy the Earth, is analogous to the plot of the 1997 Luc Besson film The Fifth Element. The movie's antagonist, referred to as the "great evil," is a giant sentient sphere with the ability to communicate with humans on a mission to destroy life, and shares many attributes with Futurama's V-GINY. In both cases the President of the Earth meets with a military leader to discuss how to handle the death sphere, and they end up consulting a third party (the priest and then the scientist who rebuilds/revives Lelu in The Fifth Element, and Professor Farnsworth in Futurama) for an alternative solution to military action. In both cases, the great evil is defeated through an act of "love."

== Reception ==
In its original American broadcast, "In-A-Gadda-Da-Leela" was viewed by an estimated 2.78 million households with a 1.5 rating/5% share in the 18-49 demographic becoming the second highest rated episode of the night after Burn Notice, Royal Pains and the previous Futurama episode, "Rebirth" according to the Nielsen Media Research.

The A.V. Club reviewer Zack Helden while reviewing "Rebirth" gave the episode a B saying "'Gadda' is the weaker of the two premiere episodes. It's still funny (though not quite as funny as 'Rebirth'), but the storyline doesn't build to the sort of wild, resonant pay-off that Futurama does best". Robert Canning of IGN gave the episode an 8.0/10 calling it "Impressive" and also stated "While 'Rebirth' was forced to reacquaint and catch people up, 'In-A-Gadda-Da-Leela' was essentially a standalone episode delivering a lot of laughs and a quintessential Futurama story." Danny Gallagher of TV Squad stated in his review "It was nice to see 'Futurama' stick with its satirical roots. The best of the old episodes always had a touch of something that spoke out about something (i.e. global warming in 'Crimes of the Hot,' environmental awareness in 'A Big Piece of Garbage'). It really knew how to drive the episode, both on plot and humor, and it works here, for the most part." However, he also stated it lacked "cleverness" and delivered few laughs from Bender.
