= Rebirth (Futurama) =

- Futurama episode
- Episode no.: Season 6 Episode 1
- Directed by: Frank Marino
- Story by: Matt Groening; David X. Cohen
- Teleplay by: David X. Cohen
- Production code: 6ACV01
- Original air date: June 24, 2010

Episode features
- Opening caption: Rebirth
- Opening cartoon: "Silvery Moon" (1933)

Episode chronology
← Previous "Into the Wild Green Yonder Part 4"	Next → "In-A-Gadda-Da-Leela"
- Futurama season 6

"Rebirth" is the premiere and first episode in the sixth season of the American animated television series Futurama, the 89th episode of the series overall, and the revival of the series. It originally aired on Comedy Central in the United States on June 24, 2010. The episode was written by David X. Cohen and Matt Groening, and directed by Frank Marino.

"Rebirth" directly follows the ending of the final Futurama film Into the Wild Green Yonder, in which the entire crew enter a wormhole. The episode is the first to feature the opening sequence in high definition format. It was also the first to feature the remix version of the theme playing in the end credits. The episode begins with the Planet Express ship crash landing on Earth, killing many of the main characters. Professor Farnsworth, who survived the crash, revives the others using a "birth machine". However, a complication with Leela's rebirth results in her remaining in an irreversible coma. Out of loneliness and despair, Fry creates a robotic version of Leela, containing her memories, and they attempt to resume their relationship. The episode received positive reviews from critics.

== Plot ==
The episode opens with Fry walking into Professor Farnsworth's laboratory, asking why he (Fry) is covered in severe burns. The Professor explains that when the crew entered a wormhole to escape Zapp Brannigan and his Nimbus flagship, they emerged near Earth, but Zapp damaged the Planet Express ship, causing both ships to crash. Having survived the crash due to his "safety sphere," the Professor revives everyone killed in the crash using a "birth machine" filled with stem cells by placing their remains inside of it. Leela, however, enters an irreversible coma, much to a horrified and devastated Fry. Meanwhile, Bender is reborn lacking adequate power supply to function. The Professor fits him with a doomsday device to power him, but it generates excess power. Bender is forced to party endlessly to burn off the excess energy. Otherwise, he will explode.

A despairing Fry builds a robotic version of Leela, featuring her personality and memories, but this Robot Leela learns the truth almost immediately afterwards when Nibbler bites her arm, revealing robot circuitry underneath, and gets confused over her own identity. As per her final wishes, the human Leela is taken to a planet to be eaten by a cyclops-devouring monster called the Cyclophage. At the service, Bender's obnoxious partying wakes Leela, who is horrified by the existence of Robot Leela. The Cyclophage approaches, and the crew escapes in the ship. The Cyclophage accidentally attaches itself to the underside of the ship as it takes off.

Back on Earth, both Leelas refuse to talk to Fry because of the "freakiness" of the situation. Later that night, Fry professes his love of Leela, which the human Leela overhears. She reconciles with Fry, but a jealous Robot Leela attacks the other Leela. Fry is given a gun and told to shoot one but accidentally shoots himself, only to expose that he is also a robot. The Professor reveals that Fry was killed in the crash while shielding Leela, who survived. Fry's remains were placed in the birth machine, but to no avail. Leela, distraught over Fry's death, made a robotic version of him. However, a malfunction electrocuted Leela and severely burned the robot Fry.

A reborn Fry suddenly emerges from the birth machine. Robot Fry and Robot Leela declare their love for each other, and leave together, leaving human Fry to tell human Leela that he will wait as long as it takes for her. Bender decides he is fed up with constantly partying and begins to vibrate from the buildup of excess energy. The Cyclophage suddenly emerges and attempts to eat Leela. However, just as it prepares to eat her, Bender's severe vibrations cause one of his eyes to fall out, and the Cyclophage swallows Bender, believing him to be a cyclops. The device explodes, killing the creature. Bender emerges intact and the Professor declares that Bender expended his excess energy and is now stable. The crew leave to celebrate as the Futurama theme plays, ending the episode with Zapp rapidly emerging from the rebirth machine.

== Production ==
On June 9, 2009, 20th Century Fox announced that Comedy Central had picked up the show for 26 new half-hour episodes to begin airing in mid-2010. A smaller writing crew returned. It was originally announced that main voice actors Billy West, John DiMaggio, and Katey Sagal would return as well, but on July 17, 2009, it was announced that a casting notice was posted to replace the entire cast when 20th Century Fox Television would not meet their salary demands. Many fans were disheartened to see that the cast was not at the Futurama booth at San Diego Comic-Con. According to Phil LaMarr (who voices Hermes on the show), the cast's invitation was retracted by Fox because of a dispute over the salaries.

Near the end of a message from Maurice LaMarche that was sent to members of the "Save the Voices of Futurama" group on Facebook, LaMarche announced that the original cast would indeed be returning for the new episodes. The Toronto Star confirmed, announcing on their website that the original cast of Futurama have signed contracts with Fox to return for 26 more episodes. Similarly, an email sent to fans from Cohen and Groening reported that West, Sagal, DiMaggio, LaMarche, MacNeille, Tom, LaMarr, and Herman would all be returning for the revival, set to air in June 2010.

Cohen told Newsday in August 2009 that the reported 26-episode order means, "It will be up to 26. I can't guarantee it will be 26. But I think there's a pretty good chance it'll be exactly 26. Fox has been a little bit cagey about it, even internally. But nobody is too concerned. We're plunging ahead". Two episodes were in the process of being voice-recorded at that time, with an additional "six scripts ... in the works, ranging in scale from 'it's a crazy idea that someone's grandmother thought of' to 'it's all on paper'. ..."The first episode is tentatively titled 'Rebirth' — and in a surprisingly literal fashion, as things turn out".

Cohen's original concept for the return episode involved continuing directly from the end of Into the Wild Green Yonder. Fry and Leela would find themselves on a lush, beautiful world in a distant part of the galaxy. Before they begin to kiss, they would discover that they were in a zoo, placed there by aliens interested in breeding more humans. However, Matt Groening suggested that they instead write a story quickly bringing the characters back to Planet Express in order to more fully depict that the series had returned. Cohen agreed, feeling that a quick return to the settings of the series would help viewers unfamiliar with the previous films adjust with little difficulty.

The episode also marks Frank Marino's directorial debut for Futurama. Previous to that, Marino had done some timing work on the Futurama films, Drawn Together, and children's cartoons. Bender's plot where he always needed to be partying was challenging for the production team, who attempted to make his actions diverse in different scenes to keep it interesting while simultaneously trying to avoid being too distracting. Zapp Brannigan's return was also a last minute addition, as each draft neglected to explain how he regains his full body. Groening suggested the last minute tag-on.

In the original airing, the episode begins with Bender's voice announcing that people will forget the series was ever cancelled "by idiots" and later revived "by bigger idiots." In subsequent airings and on the Futurama: Volume 5 DVD, Bender instead announces a test of "the Emergency Hypnotoad System" (on the DVD version, the original aired version of the opening can be found as an extra).

== Cultural references ==
During the episode there are references to Huey Lewis and Star Trek as well as Frankenstein, Saturday Night Fever, The Outer Limits, The Terminator, Karma Chameleon and Studio 54. The rebirthing process is very similar to The Outer Limits episode "Resurrection" where an adult human is born in a lab. The club the crew visits is called Studio 1^{2}2^{1}3^{3}. This is a reference to Studio 54 when each number in the club name is multiplied (1^{2} = 1, 2^{1} = 2, 3^{3} = 27; 1 × 2 × 27 = 54). Bender's predicament is based on the 1994 film Speed. Robot Leela's realization of her true identity as a robot was thematic of the trope in science fiction, such as in The Six Million Dollar Man and Blade Runner. The Panama wormhole the Professor mentions is a reference to the canal that is the key conduit for international maritime trade, the Panama Canal. The Professor also calls going through the Panama wormhole being on a “comedy” central for interstellar trade, not-so-subtly referencing the change in network from Fox to Comedy Central.

== Reception ==
According to the Nielsen Media Research, in its original American broadcast, "Rebirth" was viewed by an estimated 2.92 million households and received a 1.6 rating/5% share in the 18–49 demographic, tying with the highest rated shows of the night in the demographic, Burn Notice and Royal Pains.

Robert Canning of IGN gave the episode a 7.5 calling it "Good" and also stated "While the big laughs may be few, "Rebirth" still delivers an interesting story." He also said he noticed some jokes from previous episodes of Futurama and some jokes from Matt Groening's other show The Simpsons. Zack Handlen of The A.V. Club gave the episode an A−, saying, "I'll save you the worry: it's good. It's not incredible, but it works, and it's proof that running time really was the biggest drawback with the movies." Danny Gallagher of TV Squad said in his review "The story itself also felt a little too forced with its tied up ending, but it still had a great sense of surprise and shock that worked like a perfect 'Twilight Zone' parody".
