= North Coast Women's Care Medical Group, Inc. v. Superior Court =

2008 California Supreme Court ruling

- Supreme Court of California

Argued May 28, 2008 Decided August 18, 2008
- Full case name: North Coast Women's Care Medical Group, Inc., et al., Petitioners, v. San Diego County Superior Court, Respondent; Guadalupe T. Benitez, Real Party in Interest.
- Citation(s): 44 Cal. 4th 1145; 189 P.3d 959; 81 Cal. Rptr. 3d 708

Holding
- Physicians cannot use religious objections as a reason to deny treatment to patients based on their sexual orientation, as sexual orientation is a protected class.

Court membership
- Chief Justice: Ronald M. George
- Associate Justices: Joyce L. Kennard, Marvin R. Baxter, Kathryn Werdegar, Ming Chin, Carlos R. Moreno, Carol Corrigan

Case opinions
- Majority: Kennard, joined by George, Baxter, Werdegar, Chin, Moreno, Corrigan
- Concurrence: Baxter

Laws applied
- Unruh Civil Rights Act (Cal. Civ. Code § 51)

North Coast Women's Care Medical Group, Inc. v. San Diego County Superior Court (44 Cal. 4th 1145) is a case decided before the California Supreme Court on August 18, 2008, ruling that physicians must offer IUI infertility services to gays and lesbians despite religious objections or find a colleague in their office who will do so.

The suit was brought by Guadalupe Benitez, a lesbian from Oceanside, California, who was treated in 1999 for infertility at the only clinic in her area that accepted her insurance. Two physicians at the North Coast Women's Care Medical Group, Christine Brody and Douglas Fenton, refused to perform an artificial insemination treatment on Benitez because they claimed that such treatment to an unmarried person violated their Christian religious beliefs.

After she was denied treatment, Benitez argued in court that the physicians and the clinic really based their decision on her being a lesbian. This violated the Unruh Civil Rights Act, a state law prohibiting discrimination based on sex, gender, sexual orientation, race, and ethnicity covering places of business and public accommodation; marital status was not addressed until 2006. She won at the trial court level in San Diego, but that decision was later overturned by a state appeals court. The California State Supreme Court's decision favoring Benitez was unanimous.

Writing for the court, Justice Kennard said:

[..] California's Unruh Civil Rights Act, from which defendant physicians seek religious exemption, is "a valid and neutral law of general applicability" (Smith, supra, 494 U.S. at p. 879). As relevant in this case, it requires business establishments to provide "full and equal accommodations, advantages, facilities, privileges, or services" to all persons notwithstanding their sexual orientation. (Civ. Code, § 51, subds. (a) & (b).) Accordingly, the First Amendment's right to the free exercise of religion does not exempt defendant physicians here from conforming their conduct to the Act's antidiscrimination requirements even if compliance poses an incidental conflict with defendants' religious beliefs. (Lukumi, supra, 508 U.S. at p. 531; Smith, supra, at p. 879.)
