= Love's Labours Lost in Space =

- Futurama episode
- Episode no.: Season 1 Episode 4
- Directed by: Brian Sheesley
- Written by: Brian Kelley
- Production code: 1ACV04
- Original air date: April 13, 1999

Episode features
- Opening caption: Presented In Brain Control Where Available
- Opening cartoon: "The Wacky Wabbit" from Merrie Melodies by Warner Bros. Cartoons (1942)

Episode chronology
← Previous "I, Roommate"	Next → "Fear of a Bot Planet"
- Futurama season 1

"Love's Labours Lost in Space" is the fourth episode in the first season of the American animated television series Futurama. It originally aired on the Fox network in the United States on April 13, 1999. The episode was written by Brian Kelley and directed by Brian Sheesley. This episode introduces the recurring character Zapp Brannigan when he attempts to prevent the Planet Express crew from completing their mission. It also introduces the characters of Kif Kroker, Brannigan's aide, and Nibbler, whom Leela adopts as a pet.

== Plot ==
Leela has had a series of unsuccessful dates (her latest being the one from the cold opening where the date is initially going well until she discovers her date's "vile lizard tongue"), so Amy and the others take her to The Hip Joint to meet eligible bachelors. While everyone else leaves with a date, Leela rejects several prospective companions and leaves alone.

The next day, Professor Farnsworth sends the crew on a "tax-deductible mission of charity": the uninhabited planet Vergon 6 has been mined hollow for its dark matter, an incredibly dense substance that is valued as starship fuel, and its imminent collapse will render all of the native animal species extinct. Farnsworth instructs the crew to recover two of each kind of animal native to the planet for breeding purposes à la Noah's Ark.

As the crew arrives in the Vergon system, they find a security cordon put in place around the planet by the starship Nimbus, which Leela recognizes as the flagship of famed space captain Zapp Brannigan. Upon docking with the ship and coming aboard, the Planet Express crew meet Zapp and his long-suffering executive officer, Lieutenant Kif Kroker. Though Leela is initially flattered to meet Zapp, relations later turn sour when Zapp rejects Leela's request for help in saving the animals of Vergon 6; the Democratic Order of Planets (D.O.O.P.) has declared Vergon 6 restricted, as interfering with undeveloped worlds is forbidden (even though it was a D.O.O.P. mining crew that mined it hollow in the first place). When Leela defies Zapp's orders to stay away from Vergon 6, Zapp throws the Planet Express crew in prison.

At night, Zapp summons Leela to his chambers, where she rebuffs his poor attempts at seduction. When Leela declares that she would rather be in prison than "spend an evening with the Zapper", Zapp breaks down crying, saying that he feels lonely in his job and that he had hoped Leela, a fellow captain, would understand. Overcome with pity, Leela eventually has sex with Zapp, but wakes up the next morning in horror after she realizes what has happened. As Leela tries to sneak away, Zapp lets her go, releases the crew and allows them to travel to Vergon 6, believing that Leela will crawl back to him.

Leela names the unknown creature "Nibbler".

While collecting the animals on their checklist, the crew discovers a small black creature with a third eye on a stalk attached to its head. Even though it is not on the list, Leela decides to rescue it as well, names it Nibbler, and places it in the cargo hold with the other animals. When Fry, Leela, and Bender return with the last animal, they discover that the mystery creature has devoured all the other animals.

The planet begins to collapse, and when the crew tries to escape, they discover that the ship is out of fuel. After admitting what happened the previous night, Leela initially refuses to ask Zapp Brannigan for assistance, but finally relents in order to save her crew. Zapp says that he will only help them if they leave Nibbler behind, so Leela rejects his offer and tells him off. With no apparent hope of rescue, the crew resign themselves to death. Nibbler then excretes a small pellet of dark matter, enough to enable the ship to escape the planet. As Vergon 6 implodes, the crew returns to Earth, while some of the native animals find refuge on the nearby asteroids.

== Production ==
When the Zapp Brannigan role was originally cast, the creators chose Saturday Night Live alumnus and semi-frequent Simpsons voice actor Phil Hartman. When Hartman was murdered by his wife in 1998, however, the role was given to Billy West (who was already cast as Phillip Fry, Professor Farnsworth, Dr. Zoidberg, and others). Though David X. Cohen credits West with using his own take on the character, West has stated that he did imitate Hartman to a certain extent in his portrayal, along with modelling it after some "big, old-time dumb announcers" with whom he and Phil had been fascinated. Billy West also did the voice of the entity of pure energy that Amy introduced to Leela. According to DVD commentary, during West's recording for that character, the studio was shut down because the producers and audio engineers thought there was a feedback problem (because of how high and cracking the voice was), not knowing until later that Billy West can produce that kind of vocal effect naturally. The painting in Zapp's "Lovenasium" is an imitation of John F. Kennedy's official presidential portrait.

== Reception ==
In 2006, IGN listed this episode as number two in their list of the top 25 Futurama episodes, noting particularly the scenes between Leela and Brannigan in his quarters and the resulting hilarity. The episode was dropped off the list in IGN's 2019 reassessment. Zack Handlen of The A.V. Club gave the episode an A, stating, "'Love’s Labours Lost In Space' is a stronger episode than 'I, Roommate' for a few reasons. It helps to see the show finally exploring some place that isn’t immediately familiar; unlike apartment hunting or even the Moon, Vergon 6 is unusual enough to expand the scope of the show’s possibilities. The montage of the crew trying to capture various bizarre animals is inventive and clever, and the fact that the story has a legitimate genre feel to it is a nice change of pace from the previous two episodes. And the story is just better structured. The fact that Nibbler excretes dark matter (aka starship fuel) is maybe a cheat, but it’s an earned cheat; the actual crux of the plot happens when Leela, faced with a choice between dying on the collapsing planet and throwing her new pet out an airlock, chooses death. It establishes Leela as legitimately heroic, even if she doesn’t have a plan to save everyone, and it leaves Zapp the loser, which is as it should be."
