= Attack of the Killer App =

- Futurama episode
- Episode no.: Season 6 Episode 3
- Directed by: Stephen Sandoval
- Written by: Patric M. Verrone
- Production code: 6ACV03
- Original air date: July 1, 2010

Guest appearance
- Craig Ferguson as Susan Boil

Episode features
- Opening caption: There will be a test

Episode chronology
← Previous "In-A-Gadda-Da-Leela"	Next → "Proposition Infinity"
- Futurama season 6

"Attack of the Killer App" is the third episode in the sixth season of the American animated television series Futurama, and the 91st episode of the series overall. It originally aired on Comedy Central in the United States on July 1, 2010. The episode focuses on the release of the new eyePhone, resulting in Fry posting a viral video of Leela on the Internet. Craig Ferguson, host of The Late Late Show with Craig Ferguson, guest stars as Leela's singing boil, Susan.

== Plot ==
The episode opens with the Planet Express crew recycling their old E-waste. Professor Farnsworth announces that they will be delivering all the Earth's old electronics to the Third World (of the Antares system). After dropping them off, they decide it would be better to keep using their old electronics. This changes when they see a commercial for MomCorp's new eyePhone. The crew all buy eyePhones, which feature a wide variety of applications, including Twitcher. Bender and Fry get into a competition to get the most followers, wagering a dollar and stating that the loser must jump into a tub of two-headed alien goat vomit and diarrhea.

Meanwhile, Mom reveals to her sons that the eyePhones allow her to direct market to the users, based on what they post on Twitcher. She also reveals her evil plan whereby the "twit worm" will be transmitted as soon as someone has one million followers. The twit worm will work as a virus infecting the human brain and making people into mindless zombies that follow her every whim.

Fry decides he needs to have more interesting twits in order to beat Bender. He soon discovers that Leela has a boil, named Susan, which sings show tunes. Fry shares video of the boil on his eyePhone, in spite of his promise not to. The video is a hit and Leela is ridiculed wherever she goes. Fry and Bender both reach one million followers simultaneously and Mom transmits the twit worm to all of their followers, including Hermes Conrad, Amy Wong and Professor Farnsworth.

Leela discovers that her humiliation is old news and that a new video has everyone's attention. She forgives Fry and he reveals to her that he posted a video of himself completing the loser's side of the bet in order to make up for the humiliation he caused her. Meanwhile, Mom's virus activates, turning Fry's and Bender's followers to zombies who get in line to buy the eyePhone 2.0 while Mom looks on satisfied.

== Continuity ==
Bender's good twin Flexo makes a brief cameo in one of the recycling bins.

== Cultural references ==
Most of the episode focuses on parodies of the iPhone and Twitter, renamed the eyePhone and Twitcher respectively. The eyePhone is placed directly in the eye, hence the name. Fry asks, "Since when is the internet about robbing people of their privacy?", to which Bender replies, "August 6, 1991", which is the date that Tim Berners-Lee announced the World Wide Web project and software on the newsgroup alt.hypertext. A video clip shot by Fry reveals that Leela has a boil (voiced by Craig Ferguson) named Susan on her right buttock that sings show tunes with a Scottish accent, a reference to singer Susan Boyle. The song that was shown in the episode was "I Dreamed a Dream", the same song which Susan Boyle performed in her first audition of Britain's Got Talent and later brought her worldwide fame.

== Broadcast and reception ==
In the original American broadcast, "Attack of the Killer App" was viewed by an estimated 2.159 million households receiving a 1.3 rating/2% share in the Nielsen ratings and 1.1 rating/4% share in the 18-49 demographic.

Reviewer Robert Canning of IGN rated the episode 8.5 out of 10, calling it "great" and stating that ""Attack of the Killer App" had more than enough great laughs to outweigh this weak bit", in reference to the Susan Boyle joke. He also praised the references to iPhone and Twitter jokes. The A.V. Club reviewer Zack Helden gave the episode a B, saying: "This was funny, generally, and I'm glad the series hasn't lost its teeth. It's just, I miss the writers' habit of biting off just a little more than they could chew." He also found the Susan Boyle jokes to be "mean-spirited" but clever and so "bizarre that it worked". Darren Franich of Entertainment Weekly said the episode was "as good as anything the show produced in its prime" particularly commenting on the speed of the episode and the precision of its satire. He also noted that the episode benefited from good timing, coming right on the heels of recent iPad and iPhone releases which kept the episode from feeling "outdated". Sean Gandert of Paste rated the episode a 7.1. While he found the eyePhone jokes to be clever, he refers to the Boil plotline as "a horrifically stupid joke that dominates and largely ruins the second part of the episode".

The episode is the origin of the "shut up and take my money" meme.

== See also ==
- Killer app, the concept
- Apple Vision Pro
