= List of Futurama episodes =

Episode list for an animated series

Futurama is an American animated science fiction sitcom created and developed by Matt Groening and David X. Cohen for the Fox Broadcasting Company, originally aired from March 28, 1999, to August 10, 2003, before being effectively cancelled. Starting in 2007, 20th Century Fox Television released four straight-to-DVD Futurama films. These films were subsequently reconfigured into four episodes each and were broadcast on four separate nights in 2008 and 2009 on Comedy Central as a fifth season. This was followed by a sixth and seventh season airing from 2010 to 2013 when the show was cancelled again. In February 2022, Hulu revived the series with a 20-episode order, which aired over 2023 and 2024. In November 2023, Hulu renewed the show for a tenth and eleventh production season, consisting a total of 20 further episodes, to air from 2025 to 2026. The series' eleventh production season premiered on August 3, 2026. In July 2026, it was announced that the series had been renewed for a "season of extra-long specials", consisting of three episodes described as "XXXL".

The original 72-episode run of Futurama was produced as four seasons; however, after the first season, Fox broadcast the episodes out of the intended order, resulting in five aired seasons. As a consequence, the show's continuity is disrupted by the broadcast order. For example, the episode "Fry and Leela's Big Fling" follows on from the ending of the previous episode in production order (which is "T.: The Terrestrial"); however, the episodes were not aired consecutively. Each of the show's 26-episode sixth and seventh seasons on Comedy Central was split into two 13-episode halves and broadcast effectively as four separate broadcast seasons over four years. Some of the episodes of those seasons were also aired out of production order, though episodes always aired within the half-season they were produced. Moreover, different regions and networks use different ordering for the episodes. Some countries broadcast the original 72 episodes in the four-season production-order. In the UK, the first 13 episodes of the series' sixth (production) season were released on DVD/BD as "season five".

As of September 28, 2026, 180 episodes of Futurama have been released, concluding the eleventh season.

== Series overview ==
This list follows the season box sets, which feature the episodes in the original production season order, ignoring the order of broadcast. The original run was released on Fox and its first revival was on Comedy Central. The second revival is domestically on Hulu, while internationally it is on Disney+. The tenth and eleventh production seasons are considered Futurama's thirteenth and fourteenth broadcast seasons.

Produced season	Broadcast season	Episodes		Originally released		
Produced season	Broadcast season	Episodes		First released	Last released	Network
1	1–2	13		March 28, 1999	November 14, 1999	Fox
2	2–3	19		November 21, 1999	December 3, 2000	Fox
3	3–4	22		January 21, 2001	December 8, 2002	Fox
4	4–5	18		February 10, 2002	August 10, 2003	Fox
5	6	16		March 23, 2008	August 30, 2009	Comedy; Central
6	7	26	13	June 24, 2010	November 21, 2010	Comedy; Central
6	8	26	13	June 23, 2011	September 8, 2011	Comedy; Central
7	9	26	13	June 20, 2012	August 29, 2012	Comedy; Central
7	10	26	13	June 19, 2013	September 4, 2013	Comedy; Central
8	11	10		July 24, 2023	September 25, 2023	Hulu
9	12	10		July 29, 2024	September 30, 2024	Hulu
10	13	10		September 15, 2025		Hulu
11	14	10		August 3, 2026	September 28, 2026	Hulu

== Episodes ==
=== Season 1 (1999) ===
No. overall	No. in season	Title	Directed by	Written by	Original release date	Prod. code	U.S. viewers (millions)
1	1	"Space Pilot 3000"	Rich Moore & Gregg Vanzo	David X. Cohen & Matt Groening	March 28, 1999	1ACV01	19.04
2	2	"The Series Has Landed"	Peter Avanzino	Ken Keeler	April 4, 1999	1ACV02	14.23
3	3	"I, Roommate"	Bret Haaland	Eric Horsted	April 6, 1999	1ACV03	8.89
4	4	"Love's Labours Lost in Space"	Brian Sheesley	Brian Kelley	April 13, 1999	1ACV04	10.14
5	5	"Fear of a Bot Planet"	Peter Avanzino & Carlos Baeza; Ashley Lenz & Chris Sauvé (co-directors)	Evan Gore & Heather Lombard	April 20, 1999	1ACV05	9.69
6	6	"A Fishful of Dollars"	Ron Hughart & Gregg Vanzo	Patric M. Verrone	April 27, 1999	1ACV06	9.70
7	7	"My Three Suns"	Jeffrey Lynch & Kevin O'Brien	J. Stewart Burns	May 4, 1999	1ACV07	8.24
8	8	"A Big Piece of Garbage"	Susie Dietter	Lewis Morton	May 11, 1999	1ACV08	8.45
9	9	"Hell Is Other Robots"	Rich Moore	Eric Kaplan	May 18, 1999	1ACV09	7.39
10	10	"A Flight to Remember"	Peter Avanzino	Eric Horsted	September 26, 1999	1ACV10	11.54
11	11	"Mars University"	Bret Haaland	J. Stewart Burns	October 3, 1999	1ACV11	10.79
12	12	"When Aliens Attack"	Brian Sheesley	Ken Keeler	November 7, 1999	1ACV12	12.25
13	13	"Fry and the Slurm Factory"	Ron Hughart	Lewis Morton	November 14, 1999	1ACV13	12.86

=== Season 2 (1999–2000) ===
No. overall	No. in season	Title	Directed by	Written by	Original release date	Prod. code	U.S. viewers (millions)
14	1	"I Second That Emotion"	Mark Ervin	Patric M. Verrone	November 21, 1999	2ACV01	15.32
15	2	"Brannigan, Begin Again"	Jeffrey Lynch	Lewis Morton	November 28, 1999	2ACV02	13.34
16	3	"A Head in the Polls"	Bret Haaland	J. Stewart Burns	December 12, 1999	2ACV03	12.84
17	4	"Xmas Story"	Peter Avanzino	David X. Cohen	December 19, 1999	2ACV04	12.45
18	5	"Why Must I Be a Crustacean in Love?"	Brian Sheesley	Eric Kaplan	February 6, 2000	2ACV05	6.65
19	6	"The Lesser of Two Evils"	Chris Sauvé	Eric Horsted	February 20, 2000	2ACV06	7.07
20	7	"Put Your Head on My Shoulders"	Chris Loudon	Ken Keeler	February 13, 2000	2ACV07	7.94
21	8	"Raging Bender"	Ron Hughart	Lewis Morton	February 27, 2000	2ACV08	8.19
22	9	"A Bicyclops Built for Two"	Susie Dietter	Eric Kaplan	March 19, 2000	2ACV09	6.55
23	10	"A Clone of My Own"	Rich Moore	Patric M. Verrone	April 9, 2000	2ACV10	5.34
24	11	"How Hermes Requisitioned His Groove Back"	Mark Ervin	Bill Odenkirk	April 2, 2000	2ACV11	5.46
25	12	"The Deep South"	Bret Haaland	J. Stewart Burns	April 16, 2000	2ACV12	5.74
26	13	"Bender Gets Made"	Peter Avanzino	Eric Horsted	April 30, 2000	2ACV13	5.74
27	14	"Mother's Day"	Brian Sheesley	Lewis Morton	May 14, 2000	2ACV14	6.09
28	15	"The Problem with Popplers"	Chris Sauvé & Gregg Vanzo	Story by : Darin Henry & Patric M. Verrone; Teleplay by : Patric M. Verrone	May 7, 2000	2ACV15	5.58
29	16	"Anthology of Interest I"	Chris Loudon & Rich Moore	Eric Rogers	May 21, 2000	2ACV16	5.47
29	16	"Anthology of Interest I"	Chris Loudon & Rich Moore	Ken Keeler	May 21, 2000	2ACV16	5.47
29	16	"Anthology of Interest I"	Chris Loudon & Rich Moore	David X. Cohen	May 21, 2000	2ACV16	5.47
30	17	"War Is the H-Word"	Ron Hughart	Eric Horsted	November 26, 2000	2ACV17	6.00
31	18	"The Honking"	Susie Dietter	Ken Keeler	November 5, 2000	2ACV18	9.78
32	19	"The Cryonic Woman"	Mark Ervin	J. Stewart Burns	December 3, 2000	2ACV19	6.81

=== Season 3 (2001–2002) ===
No. overall	No. in season	Title	Directed by	Written by	Original release date	Prod. code	U.S. viewers (millions)
33	1	"Amazon Women in the Mood"	Brian Sheesley	Lewis Morton	February 4, 2001	3ACV01	8.18
34	2	"Parasites Lost"	Peter Avanzino	Eric Kaplan	January 21, 2001	3ACV02	8.35
35	3	"A Tale of Two Santas"	Ron Hughart	Bill Odenkirk	December 23, 2001	3ACV03	7.29
36	4	"The Luck of the Fryrish"	Chris Loudon	Ron Weiner	March 11, 2001	3ACV04	7.80
37	5	"The Birdbot of Ice-Catraz"	James Purdum	Dan Vebber	March 4, 2001	3ACV05	7.92
38	6	"Bendless Love"	Swinton O. Scott III	Eric Horsted	February 11, 2001	3ACV06	8.20
39	7	"The Day the Earth Stood Stupid"	Mark Ervin	Story by : Jeff Westbrook & David X. Cohen; Teleplay by : Jeff Westbrook	February 18, 2001	3ACV07	8.29
40	8	"That's Lobstertainment!"	Bret Haaland	Patric M. Verrone	February 25, 2001	3ACV08	8.06
41	9	"The Cyber House Rules"	Susie Dietter	Lewis Morton	April 1, 2001	3ACV09	6.37
42	10	"Where the Buggalo Roam"	Patty Shinagawa	J. Stewart Burns	March 3, 2002	3ACV10	7.61
43	11	"Insane in the Mainframe"	Peter Avanzino	Bill Odenkirk	April 8, 2001	3ACV11	7.57
44	12	"The Route of All Evil"	Brian Sheesley	Dan Vebber	December 8, 2002	3ACV12	4.21
45	13	"Bendin' in the Wind"	Ron Hughart	Eric Horsted	April 22, 2001	3ACV13	6.04
46	14	"Time Keeps On Slippin'"	Chris Loudon	Ken Keeler	May 6, 2001	3ACV14	6.51
47	15	"I Dated a Robot"	James Purdum	Eric Kaplan	May 13, 2001	3ACV15	6.06
48	16	"A Leela of Her Own"	Swinton O. Scott III	Patric M. Verrone	April 7, 2002	3ACV16	4.99
49	17	"A Pharaoh to Remember"	Mark Ervin	Ron Weiner	March 10, 2002	3ACV17	6.13
50	18	"Anthology of Interest II"	Bret Haaland	Lewis Morton	January 6, 2002	3ACV18	7.74
50	18	"Anthology of Interest II"	Bret Haaland	David X. Cohen	January 6, 2002	3ACV18	7.74
50	18	"Anthology of Interest II"	Bret Haaland	Jason Gorbett & Scott Kirby	January 6, 2002	3ACV18	7.74
51	19	"Roswell That Ends Well"	Rich Moore	J. Stewart Burns	December 9, 2001	3ACV19	5.40
52	20	"Godfellas"	Susie Dietter	Ken Keeler	March 17, 2002	3ACV20	5.83
53	21	"Future Stock"	Brian Sheesley	Aaron Ehasz	March 31, 2002	3ACV21	4.79
54	22	"The 30% Iron Chef"	Ron Hughart	Jeff Westbrook	April 14, 2002	3ACV22	4.73

=== Season 4 (2002–2003) ===
No. overall	No. in season	Title	Directed by	Written by	Original release date	Prod. code	U.S. viewers (millions)
55	1	"Kif Gets Knocked Up a Notch"	Wes Archer	Bill Odenkirk	January 12, 2003	4ACV01	5.73
56	2	"Leela's Homeworld"	Mark Ervin	Kristin Gore	February 17, 2002	4ACV02	5.64
57	3	"Love and Rocket"	Brian Sheesley	Dan Vebber	February 10, 2002	4ACV03	6.27
58	4	"Less Than Hero"	Susie Dietter	Ron Weiner	March 2, 2003	4ACV04	7.00
59	5	"A Taste of Freedom"	James Purdum	Eric Horsted	December 22, 2002	4ACV05	4.20
60	6	"Bender Should Not Be Allowed on TV"	Ron Hughart	Lewis Morton	August 3, 2003	4ACV06	4.38
61	7	"Jurassic Bark"	Swinton O. Scott III	Eric Kaplan	November 17, 2002	4ACV07	5.98
62	8	"Crimes of the Hot"	Peter Avanzino	Aaron Ehasz	November 10, 2002	4ACV08	4.15
63	9	"Teenage Mutant Leela's Hurdles"	Bret Haaland	Jeff Westbrook	March 30, 2003	4ACV09	5.89
64	10	"The Why of Fry"	Wes Archer	David X. Cohen	April 6, 2003	4ACV10	4.43
65	11	"Where No Fan Has Gone Before"	Patty Shinagawa	David A. Goodman	April 21, 2002	4ACV11	6.54
66	12	"The Sting"	Brian Sheesley	Patric M. Verrone	June 1, 2003	4ACV12	3.86
67	13	"Bend Her"	James Purdum	Michael Rowe	July 20, 2003	4ACV13	4.32
68	14	"Obsoletely Fabulous"	Dwayne Carey-Hill	Dan Vebber	July 27, 2003	4ACV14	4.57
69	15	"The Farnsworth Parabox"	Ron Hughart	Bill Odenkirk	June 8, 2003	4ACV15	4.79
70	16	"Three Hundred Big Boys"	Swinton O. Scott III	Eric Kaplan	June 15, 2003	4ACV16	4.39
71	17	"Spanish Fry"	Peter Avanzino	Ron Weiner	July 13, 2003	4ACV17	3.95
72	18	"The Devil's Hands Are Idle Playthings"	Bret Haaland	Ken Keeler	August 10, 2003	4ACV18	4.31

=== Season 5 (2008–2009) ===
No. overall	No. in season	Title	Directed by	Written by	Original release date	Prod. code
73	1	Bender's Big Score	Dwayne Carey-Hill	Story by : Ken Keeler & David X. Cohen; Teleplay by : Ken Keeler	November 27, 2007 (DVD); March 23, 2008 (Comedy Central)	5ACV01
74	2	Bender's Big Score	Dwayne Carey-Hill	Story by : Ken Keeler & David X. Cohen; Teleplay by : Ken Keeler	November 27, 2007 (DVD); March 23, 2008 (Comedy Central)	5ACV02
75	3	Bender's Big Score	Dwayne Carey-Hill	Story by : Ken Keeler & David X. Cohen; Teleplay by : Ken Keeler	November 27, 2007 (DVD); March 23, 2008 (Comedy Central)	5ACV03
76	4	Bender's Big Score	Dwayne Carey-Hill	Story by : Ken Keeler & David X. Cohen; Teleplay by : Ken Keeler	November 27, 2007 (DVD); March 23, 2008 (Comedy Central)	5ACV04
77	5	The Beast with a Billion Backs	Peter Avanzino	Story by : Eric Kaplan & David X. Cohen; Teleplay by : Eric Kaplan	June 24, 2008 (DVD); October 19, 2008 (Comedy Central)	5ACV05
78	6	The Beast with a Billion Backs	Peter Avanzino	Story by : Eric Kaplan & David X. Cohen; Teleplay by : Eric Kaplan	June 24, 2008 (DVD); October 19, 2008 (Comedy Central)	5ACV06
79	7	The Beast with a Billion Backs	Peter Avanzino	Story by : Eric Kaplan & David X. Cohen; Teleplay by : Eric Kaplan	June 24, 2008 (DVD); October 19, 2008 (Comedy Central)	5ACV07
80	8	The Beast with a Billion Backs	Peter Avanzino	Story by : Eric Kaplan & David X. Cohen; Teleplay by : Eric Kaplan	June 24, 2008 (DVD); October 19, 2008 (Comedy Central)	5ACV08
81	9	Bender's Game	Dwayne Carey-Hill	Story by : Eric Horsted & David X. Cohen; Teleplay by : Eric Horsted	November 4, 2008 (DVD); April 26, 2009 (Comedy Central)	5ACV09
82	10	Bender's Game	Dwayne Carey-Hill	Story by : Eric Horsted & David X. Cohen; Teleplay by : Eric Horsted	November 4, 2008 (DVD); April 26, 2009 (Comedy Central)	5ACV10
83	11	Bender's Game	Dwayne Carey-Hill	Story by : Eric Horsted & David X. Cohen; Teleplay by : Eric Kaplan & Michael Rowe	November 4, 2008 (DVD); April 26, 2009 (Comedy Central)	5ACV11
84	12	Bender's Game	Dwayne Carey-Hill	Story by : Eric Horsted & David X. Cohen; Teleplay by : David X. Cohen & Patric M. Verrone	November 4, 2008 (DVD); April 26, 2009 (Comedy Central)	5ACV12
85	13	Into the Wild Green Yonder	Peter Avanzino	Story by : Ken Keeler & David X. Cohen; Teleplay by : Ken Keeler	February 23, 2009 (DVD); August 30, 2009 (Comedy Central)	5ACV13
86	14	Into the Wild Green Yonder	Peter Avanzino	Ken Keeler	February 23, 2009 (DVD); August 30, 2009 (Comedy Central)	5ACV14
87	15	Into the Wild Green Yonder	Peter Avanzino	Ken Keeler	February 23, 2009 (DVD); August 30, 2009 (Comedy Central)	5ACV15
88	16	Into the Wild Green Yonder	Peter Avanzino	Story by : Ken Keeler & David X. Cohen; Teleplay by : Ken Keeler	February 23, 2009 (DVD); August 30, 2009 (Comedy Central)	5ACV16

=== Season 6 (2010–2011) ===
No. overall	No. in season	Title	Directed by	Written by	Original release date	Prod. code	U.S. viewers (millions)
Part 1
89	1	"Rebirth"	Frank Marino	Story by : David X. Cohen & Matt Groening; Teleplay by : David X. Cohen	June 24, 2010	6ACV01	2.92
90	2	"In-A-Gadda-Da-Leela"	Dwayne Carey-Hill	Story by : Carolyn Premish & Matt Groening; Teleplay by : Carolyn Premish	June 24, 2010	6ACV02	2.78
91	3	"Attack of the Killer App"	Stephen Sandoval	Patric M. Verrone	July 1, 2010	6ACV03	2.16
92	4	"Proposition Infinity"	Crystal Chesney-Thompson	Michael Rowe	July 8, 2010	6ACV04	2.01
93	5	"The Duh-Vinci Code"	Raymie Muzquiz	Maiya Williams	July 15, 2010	6ACV05	2.20
94	6	"Lethal Inspection"	Ray Claffey	Eric Horsted	July 22, 2010	6ACV06	1.92
95	7	"The Late Philip J. Fry"	Peter Avanzino	Lewis Morton	July 29, 2010	6ACV07	2.05
96	8	"That Darn Katz!"	Frank Marino	Josh Weinstein	August 5, 2010	6ACV08	1.95
97	9	"A Clockwork Origin"	Dwayne Carey-Hill	Dan Vebber	August 12, 2010	6ACV09	1.96
98	10	"The Prisoner of Benda"	Stephen Sandoval	Ken Keeler	August 19, 2010	6ACV10	1.77
99	11	"Lrrreconcilable Ndndifferences"	Crystal Chesney-Thompson	Patric M. Verrone	August 26, 2010	6ACV11	1.98
100	12	"The Mutants Are Revolting"	Raymie Muzquiz	Eric Horsted	September 2, 2010	6ACV12	1.79
101	13	"The Futurama Holiday Spectacular"	Ray Claffey	Michael Rowe	November 21, 2010	6ACV13	1.30
Part 2
102	14	"The Silence of the Clamps"	Frank Marino	Eric Rogers	July 14, 2011	6ACV14	1.41
103	15	"Möbius Dick"	Dwayne Carey-Hill	Dan Vebber	August 4, 2011	6ACV15	1.46
104	16	"Law and Oracle"	Stephen Sandoval	Josh Weinstein	July 7, 2011	6ACV16	1.55
105	17	"Benderama"	Crystal Chesney-Thompson	Aaron Ehasz	June 23, 2011	6ACV17	2.47
106	18	"The Tip of the Zoidberg"	Raymie Muzquiz	Ken Keeler	August 18, 2011	6ACV18	1.38
107	19	"Ghost in the Machines"	Ray Claffey	Patric M. Verrone	June 30, 2011	6ACV19	1.92
108	20	"Neutopia"	Edmund Fong	J. Stewart Burns	June 23, 2011	6ACV20	2.50
109	21	"Yo Leela Leela"	Frank Marino	Eric Horsted	July 21, 2011	6ACV21	1.41
110	22	"Fry Am the Egg Man"	Dwayne Carey-Hill	Michael Rowe	August 11, 2011	6ACV22	1.46
111	23	"All the Presidents' Heads"	Stephen Sandoval	Josh Weinstein	July 28, 2011	6ACV23	1.49
112	24	"Cold Warriors"	Crystal Chesney-Thompson	Dan Vebber	August 25, 2011	6ACV24	1.52
113	25	"Overclockwise"	Raymie Muzquiz	Ken Keeler	September 1, 2011	6ACV25	1.57
114	26	"Reincarnation"	Peter Avanzino	Aaron Ehasz	September 8, 2011	6ACV26	1.48

=== Season 7 (2012–2013) ===
No. overall	No. in season	Title	Directed by	Written by	Original release date	Prod. code	U.S. viewers (millions)
Part 1
115	1	"The Bots and the Bees"	Stephen Sandoval	Eric Horsted	June 20, 2012	7ACV01	1.57
116	2	"A Farewell to Arms"	Raymie Muzquiz	Josh Weinstein	June 20, 2012	7ACV02	1.65
117	3	"Decision 3012"	Dwayne Carey-Hill	Patric M. Verrone	June 27, 2012	7ACV03	1.45
118	4	"The Thief of Baghead"	Edmund Fong	Dan Vebber	July 4, 2012	7ACV04	1.07
119	5	"Zapp Dingbat"	Frank Marino	Eric Rogers	July 11, 2012	7ACV05	1.10
120	6	"The Butterjunk Effect"	Crystal Chesney-Thompson	Michael Rowe	July 18, 2012	7ACV06	1.19
121	7	"The Six Million Dollar Mon"	Peter Avanzino	Ken Keeler	July 25, 2012	7ACV07	1.19
122	8	"Fun on a Bun"	Stephen Sandoval	Dan Vebber	August 1, 2012	7ACV08	1.01
123	9	"Free Will Hunting"	Raymie Muzquiz	David X. Cohen	August 8, 2012	7ACV09	0.99
124	10	"Near-Death Wish"	Lance Kramer	Eric Horsted	August 15, 2012	7ACV10	1.18
125	11	"31st Century Fox"	Edmund Fong	Patric M. Verrone	August 29, 2012	7ACV11	1.35
126	12	"Viva Mars Vegas"	Frank Marino	Josh Weinstein	August 22, 2012	7ACV12	1.07
127	13	"Naturama"	Crystal Chesney-Thompson	Eric Rogers	August 29, 2012	7ACV13	1.36
127	13	"Naturama"	Crystal Chesney-Thompson	Michael Saikin	August 29, 2012	7ACV13	1.36
127	13	"Naturama"	Crystal Chesney-Thompson	Neil Mukhopadhyay	August 29, 2012	7ACV13	1.36
Part 2
128	14	"Forty Percent Leadbelly"	Stephen Sandoval	Ken Keeler	July 3, 2013	7ACV14	0.81
129	15	"2-D Blacktop"	Raymie Muzquiz	Michael Rowe	June 19, 2013	7ACV15	1.40
130	16	"T.: The Terrestrial"	Lance Kramer	Josh Weinstein	June 26, 2013	7ACV16	1.02
131	17	"Fry and Leela's Big Fling"	Edmund Fong	Eric Rogers	June 19, 2013	7ACV17	1.49
132	18	"The Inhuman Torch"	Frank Marino	Dan Vebber	July 10, 2013	7ACV18	1.43
133	19	"Saturday Morning Fun Pit"	Crystal Chesney-Thompson	Patric M. Verrone	July 17, 2013	7ACV19	1.13
134	20	"Calculon 2.0"	Stephen Sandoval	Lewis Morton	July 24, 2013	7ACV20	1.23
135	21	"Assie Come Home"	Raymie Muzquiz	Maiya Williams	July 31, 2013	7ACV21	1.19
136	22	"Leela and the Genestalk"	Lance Kramer	Eric Horsted	August 7, 2013	7ACV22	1.36
137	23	"Game of Tones"	Edmund Fong	Michael Rowe	August 14, 2013	7ACV23	1.07
138	24	"Murder on the Planet Express"	Frank Marino	Lewis Morton	August 21, 2013	7ACV24	1.04
139	25	"Stench and Stenchibility"	Crystal Chesney-Thompson	Eric Horsted	August 28, 2013	7ACV25	1.40
140	26	"Meanwhile"	Peter Avanzino	Ken Keeler	September 4, 2013	7ACV26	2.21

=== Season 8 (2023) ===
No. overall	No. in season	Title	Directed by	Written by	Original release date	Prod. code
141	1	"The Impossible Stream"	Peter Avanzino	Patric M. Verrone	July 24, 2023	8ACV01
142	2	"Children of a Lesser Bog"	Edmund Fong	Eric Horsted	July 31, 2023	8ACV02
143	3	"How the West Was 1010001" (Note: "1010001" is binary for "81," which is the atomic number of thallium)	James Kim	Ken Keeler (Note: Credited as "Nona di Spargement")	August 7, 2023	8ACV03
144	4	"Parasites Regained"	Corey Barnes	Maiya Williams	August 14, 2023	8ACV04
145	5	"Related to Items You've Viewed"	Andrew Han	David A. Goodman	August 21, 2023	8ACV05
146	6	"I Know What You Did Next Xmas"	Crystal Chesney-Thompson	Ariel Ladensohn	August 28, 2023	8ACV06
147	7	"Rage Against the Vaccine"	Edmund Fong	Cody Ziglar	September 4, 2023	8ACV07
148	8	"Zapp Gets Canceled"	James Kim	Shirin Najafi	September 11, 2023	8ACV08
149	9	"The Prince and the Product"	Corey Barnes	Ari Kaplan & Eric Kaplan	September 18, 2023	8ACV09
150	10	"All the Way Down"	Ira Sherak	David X. Cohen	September 25, 2023	8ACV10

=== Season 9 (2024) ===
No. overall	No. in season	Title	Directed by	Written by	Original release date	Prod. code
151	1	"The One Amigo"	Andrew Han	Eric Horsted	July 29, 2024	9ACV01
152	2	"Quids Game"	Crystal Chesney-Thompson	Cody Ziglar	August 5, 2024	9ACV02
153	3	"The Temp"	Edmund Fong	David A. Goodman	August 12, 2024	9ACV03
154	4	"Beauty and the Bug"	Corey Barnes	Patric M. Verrone	August 19, 2024	9ACV04
155	5	"One Is Silicon and the Other Gold"	Ira Sherak	Maiya Williams	August 26, 2024	9ACV05
156	6	"Attack of the Clothes"	Andrew Han	Ariel Ladensohn	September 2, 2024	9ACV06
157	7	"Planet Espresso"	Crystal Chesney-Thompson	Bill Odenkirk	September 9, 2024	9ACV07
158	8	"Cuteness Overlord"	Edmund Fong	Kristin Gore	September 16, 2024	9ACV08
159	9	"The Futurama Mystery Liberry"	Corey Barnes	David X. Cohen and Jeanette Lim and Patric M. Verrone	September 23, 2024	9ACV09
160	10	"Otherwise"	Ira Sherak	Ken Keeler	September 30, 2024	9ACV10

=== Season 10 (2025) ===
No. overall	No. in season	Title	Directed by	Written by	Original release date	Prod. code
161	1	"Destroy Tall Monsters"	Ira Sherak	David X. Cohen	September 15, 2025	AACV01
162	2	"The World Is Hot Enough"	Edmund Fong	Maiya Williams	September 15, 2025	AACV02
163	3	"Fifty Shades of Green"	Crystal Chesney-Thompson	Ariel Ladensohn	September 15, 2025	AACV03
164	4	"The Numberland Gap"	Andrew Han	Ken Walsh	September 15, 2025	AACV04
165	5	"Scared Screenless"	Dwayne Carey-Hill	Bill Odenkirk	September 15, 2025	AACV05
166	6	"Wicked Human"	Ira Sherak	Eric Horsted	September 15, 2025	AACV06
167	7	"Murderoni"	Edmund Fong	Cody Ziglar	September 15, 2025	AACV07
168	8	"Crab Splatter"	Crystal Chesney-Thompson	Shirin Najafi	September 15, 2025	AACV08
169	9	"The Trouble with Truffles"	Andrew Han	David A. Goodman	September 15, 2025	AACV09
170	10	"The White Hole"	Peter Avanzino	Patric M. Verrone	September 15, 2025	AACV10

=== Season 11 (2026) ===
This is the first season to feature a different production and broadcast order since the seventh season. Unlike the previous season, the episodes aired weekly instead of being released on one day. This list is depicted in production order, as per every previous season.

No. overall	No. in season	Title	Directed by	Written by	Original release date	Prod. code
171	1	"Beef"	Edmund Fong	Ariel Ladensohn	August 3, 2026	BACV01
172	2	"Our Flag Means Medical Coverage"	Ira Sherak	Ken Keeler	August 10, 2026	BACV02
173	3	"Lords of the Ring"	Crystal Chesney-Thompson	Bill Odenkirk	August 17, 2026	BACV03
174	4	"The Charm Offensive"	Andrew Han	Cody Ziglar	August 24, 2026	BACV04
175	5	"Catfish Hunter"	Frank Marino	Shirin Najafi	August 3, 2026	BACV05
176	6	"Late Bloomers"	Edmund Fong	Eric Horsted	August 31, 2026	BACV06
177	7	"Lord Nibbler in the Nothingverse"	Ira Sherak	Patric M. Verrone	September 7, 2026	BACV07
178	8	"Oceans Three"	Crystal Chesney-Thompson	Bill Odenkirk, Morgan Milender and Eric Horsted	September 14, 2026	BACV08
179	9	"A New New York Yankee in King Elfo's Court"	Andrew Han	Story by : Matt Groening & Josh Weinstein; Teleplay by : Josh Weinstein	September 21, 2026	BACV09
Note: This episode is a crossover with Disenchantment.
180	10	"Final Ending: The Last Conclusion"	Frank Marino	Margot Pyrceman	September 28, 2026	BACV10
A post-credits scene for "Final Ending: The Last Conclusion" first shown at New York Comic-Con and released on Hulu shortly afterward, titled "Extrarama". Fry, Bender, and the Professor use the time machine to attempt to take the film reel back to July 13, 1984 so that he and Yancy can finish seeing it, but they overshoot their mark.

== Specials ==
=== Everybody Loves Hypnotoad ===
Included on the DVD release of Bender's Big Score is a full-length 22-minute episode of Everybody Loves Hypnotoad, titled "Amazon Adventure", based on the fictional show produced by Hypnotoad. "Amazon Adventure" begins with an establishing shot of a house, before immediately cutting to Hypnotoad hypnotizing the audience. Other establishing shots and advertisements are interspersed throughout the episode.

=== Futurama: The Lost Adventure ===
The Futurama video game was released shortly after the airing of the 72nd and final episode of Fox's run of the series in August 2003. The game's story and dialogue were written by J. Stewart Burns, and the voice direction was by David X. Cohen. According to Cohen, the half-hour's worth of cutscenes in the game were originally written as "the 73rd episode of the original series." These cutscenes were compiled together (along with footage of the video game being played) and released as a bonus feature on the DVD release of The Beast with a Billion Backs. Renamed Futurama: The Lost Adventure, the episode tells of how the Planet Express crew prevented Mom from using Earth to take over the Universe.

=== Futurama Live! ===
Futurama Live! first aired on July 11, 2012, on Comedy Central following the original broadcast of the episode "Zapp Dingbat", the public were given the chance to participate in a live chat with the Futurama cast and crew. Several previews of upcoming Season 7 episodes were shown during the live stream, and several details about the season were revealed, including: returning appearances by the characters Guenter and Dr. Banjo in an episode of broadcast season 10, the debut of Lrrr's son, a three-part episode featuring 1980s-style animation, the status of Mars, and the possibility of "Möbius strip clubs". One lucky fan even won a prize.

A second episode of Futurama Live! was aired as a live Internet webcast event broadcast on September 4, 2013, on the Comedy Central website and the Nerdist YouTube channel as part of the Futurama series finale. It was broadcast in two parts, the first part was the pre-show hosted by Chris Hardwick and featured creator Matt Groening, series showrunner David X. Cohen and voice actors Phil Lamarr and Lauren Tom. The second part was the post-series finale webcast again hosted by Hardwick with Groening and Cohen and actors Maurice LaMarche and Billy West discussing the series finale and different aspects of the show.

=== Radiorama ===
Radiorama is a special podcast episode of Futurama made for the Nerdist Podcast to help promote Futurama: Worlds of Tomorrow reuniting the entire Futurama cast as well as special guest star Chris Hardwick as the villain, Klaxxon. The podcast was released on September 14, 2017. The episode was written by David X. Cohen, Ken Keeler and Patric M. Verrone.

== Home media ==
Season	Home release	Home release date		
Season	Home release	Region 1	Region 2	Region 4
1	Futurama, Volume 1	March 25, 2003	January 28, 2002	November 27, 2002
2	Futurama, Volume 2	August 12, 2003	November 11, 2002	May 13, 2003
3	Futurama, Volume 3	March 9, 2004	June 2, 2003	September 24, 2003
4	Futurama, Volume 4	August 24, 2004	November 24, 2003	February 18, 2004
5	Bender's Big Score	November 27, 2007	March 31, 2008	March 5, 2008
5	The Beast with a Billion Backs	June 24, 2008	June 30, 2008	August 6, 2008
5	Bender's Game	November 4, 2008	November 3, 2008	December 10, 2008
5	Into the Wild Green Yonder	February 24, 2009	February 23, 2009	March 4, 2009
6	Futurama, Volume 5	December 21, 2010	December 26, 2011	November 2, 2011
6	Futurama, Volume 6	December 20, 2011	June 24, 2013	December 21, 2011
7	Futurama, Volume 7	December 11, 2012	July 21, 2014	December 12, 2012
7	Futurama, Volume 8	December 10, 2013	February 2, 2015	December 11, 2013

== See also ==
- "Simpsorama" (2014) – a crossover episode of The Simpsons
- "Dreamland Falls" (2018) – an episode of Disenchantment that ties into Futurama
