= Futurama season 1 =

1st season of Futurama

Futurama
- Season 1
- DVD cover for the 2012 re-release of Volume One featuring Philip J. Fry.
- Showrunner: David X. Cohen
- No. of episodes: 13

Release
- Original network: Fox
- Original release: March 28 – November 14, 1999

Season chronology
- Next → Season 2

The first season of Futurama began airing on March 28, 1999 and concluded on November 14, 1999, after 13 episodes.

The original 72-episode run of Futurama was produced as four seasons; Fox broadcast the episodes out of the intended order, resulting in five aired seasons. As a consequence, the show's canon is disrupted by the broadcast order, and more, different regions and networks use different ordering for the episodes.

The list below features the episodes in original production order, as featured on the DVD box sets.

The entire season is included within the Volume One DVD box set, which was released on March 25, 2003. The last four episodes were pre-empted by sporting events and pushed into the second broadcast season.

The full thirteen episodes of the season have been released on a box set called Futurama: Volume One, on DVD and VHS. It was released in the United Kingdom, on January 28, 2002, in Australia on November 27, 2002 and in the United States and Canada on March 25, 2003. The season was re-released as Futurama: Volume 1, with entirely different packaging to match the newer season releases on July 17, 2012.

== Production ==
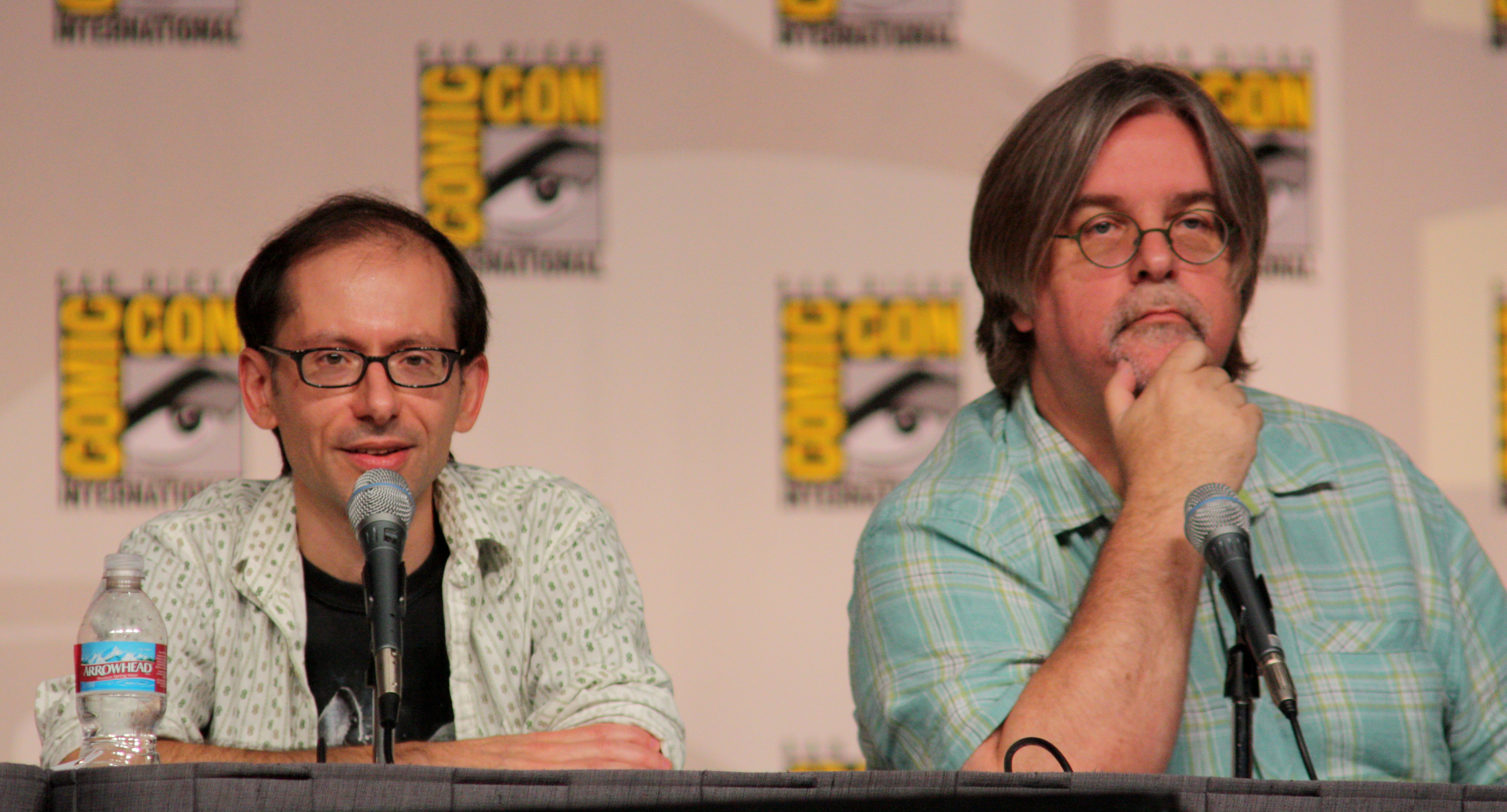
David X. Cohen and Matt Groening at the Futurama panel of Comic-Con 2009.

Matt Groening initially conceived of Futurama in the mid-1990s. In 1996, he enlisted David X. Cohen, then a The Simpsons writer and producer, to assist in developing the series; the two then spent time researching science fiction books, television shows, and films of the past. By the time they pitched the series to Fox in April 1998, Groening and Cohen had composed many characters and story lines. During that first meeting, Fox ordered thirteen episodes. Shortly after, however, Groening and Fox executives argued over whether the network would have any creative input into the show. With The Simpsons the network has no input. Groening explains, "When they tried to give me notes on Futurama, I just said: 'No, we're going to do this just the way we did Simpsons.' And they said, 'Well, we don't do business that way anymore.' And I said, 'Oh, well, that's the only way I do business.'" After negotiations, he received the same independence with Futurama. The name "Futurama" comes from a pavilion at the 1939 New York World's Fair. Designed by Norman Bel Geddes, the Futurama pavilion depicted how he imagined the world would look in 1959.

== Reception ==
The first season of Futurama received positive reviews from critics. Patrick Lee of Science Fiction Weekly commented, based on a viewing of "Space Pilot 3000" alone, that Futurama was not as funny as The Simpsons, particularly as "the satire is leavened with treacly sentimental bits about free will and loneliness". The episode was rated as an "A- pick" and found to "warrant further viewing" despite these concerns. Rob Owen of the Pittsburgh Post-Gazette noted that although the series' premiere contained the same skewed humor as The Simpsons, it was not as smart and funny, and he attributed this to the large amount of exposition and character introduction required of a television series pilot, noting that the show was "off to a good start." Andrew Billen of New Statesman found the premise of "Space Pilot 3000" to be unoriginal, but remained somewhat enthusiastic about the future of the series. While he praised the humorous details of the episode, such as the background scenes while Fry was frozen, he also criticized the show's dependence on in-jokes such as Groening's head being present in the head museum. The episode was ranked in 2006 by IGN as number 14 in their list of the top 25 Futurama episodes. In the 2013/2019 reranking, the episode dropped to number 17. Tal Blevins of IGN had positive review on the season and said "You really can't go wrong wherever you look in Futurama Volume One, and there are no stinkers in this collection." The season tied for 89th in the seasonal ratings tied with Profiler with an average viewership of 8.9 million viewers.

The series' premiere "Space Pilot 3000" garnered "unprecedented strong numbers" with a Nielsen rating of 11.2/17 in homes and 9.6/23 in adults 18–49. The Futurama premiere was watched by more people than either its lead-in show (The Simpsons) or the show following it (The X-Files), and it was the number one show among men aged 18–49 and teenagers for the week.

== Episodes ==
No. overall	No. in season	Title	Directed by	Written by	Original release date	Prod. code	U.S. viewers (millions)
1	1	"Space Pilot 3000"	Rich Moore & Gregg Vanzo	David X. Cohen & Matt Groening	March 28, 1999	1ACV01	19.04
Pizza delivery boy Philip J. Fry accidentally stumbles into a cryogenic freezer on December 31, 1999, and awakens one thousand years in the future on New Year's Eve, 2999. He meets a one-eyed career counselor named Leela, who tries to assign him an eternal career as a delivery boy. Fry dislikes the idea and escapes into the city where he meets Bender, an alcoholic robot who has also abandoned his job, and the two become friends. Fry soon becomes depressed that he can never return to his old life and surrenders to Leela, but she realizes that she also hates her job and quits. Now fugitives, the three visit Fry's descendant, Professor Farnsworth, who helps them escape from the police on his intergalactic spaceship as the world celebrates the year 3000. Farnsworth hires the three to become his crew for his intergalactic delivery service, Planet Express, with Fry becoming a delivery boy.
2	2	"The Series Has Landed"	Peter Avanzino	Ken Keeler	April 4, 1999	1ACV02	14.23
The new Planet Express crew receive their first mission: a delivery to an amusement park on the Moon. Fry is enthusiastic about the idea of going to the Moon, but is disappointed that people only go there for the amusement park and wants to see the "real Moon". He hijacks one of the rides with Leela, but gets them both stranded on the Moon's surface. Low on oxygen, they take refuge in a hydroponic farm, but Bender, who was kicked out of the amusement park, makes advances on one of the farmer's robot daughters, forcing the three to flee from the angry farmer. Fry and Leela find and take shelter in the Apollo 11 lander until all three are rescued by Planet Express intern Amy Wong.
3	3	"I, Roommate"	Bret Haaland	Eric Horsted	April 6, 1999	1ACV03	8.89
Fry lives in the Planet Express building until he is kicked out for his messiness. He initially moves in with Bender, but his new apartment is little more than a cramped closet, so they both move into a more spacious and furnished apartment. During the housewarming party, it is discovered that Bender's antenna interferes with the entire building's satellite TV reception, and Bender is evicted while Fry stays with little regard for his friend's troubles. Depressed, Bender goes on a self-destructive sobriety binge until he cuts off his antenna in the hopes of moving back with Fry. Realizing that Bender's antenna is vital to his self-esteem, Fry helps Bender reattach it and moves back into Bender's old apartment. It is then revealed that Bender's apartment has a "closet" that is the size of a complete living suite with more than enough room for Fry, so Fry decides to move there instead.
4	4	"Love's Labours Lost in Space"	Brian Sheesley	Brian Kelley	April 13, 1999	1ACV04	10.14
The Planet Express crew goes on a mission to rescue animals on Vergon 6, a planet on the verge of collapse. On the way, they meet Zapp Brannigan, who Leela is initially flattered to meet until he imprisons them. That night, Zapp tries to seduce Leela, succeeding in getting her to sympathize with his loneliness as a captain, and she has sex with him out of pity. The next day, Zapp decides to release the crew and allows them to travel to Vergon 6. While collecting the animals, Leela discovers another creature not on their list and decides to save it as well, naming it Nibbler, who subsequently devours all the other animals they saved. The planet begins to collapse and the crew find their ship is out of fuel. Leela refuses to accept Zapp's help when he tells them Nibbler must remain behind, and the crew resign to their fate until Nibbler excretes a pellet of dark matter, which gives them enough fuel to escape before the planet implodes.
5	5	"Fear of a Bot Planet"	Peter Avanzino & Carlos Baeza; Ashley Lenz & Chris Sauvé (co-directors)	Evan Gore & Heather Lombard	April 20, 1999	1ACV05	9.69
The Planet Express crew deliver a package to Chapek 9, a planet inhabited entirely by human-hating robots who kill humans on sight. Bender is sent to deliver the package alone, but is captured upon discovery that he works for humans, so Fry and Leela disguise themselves as robots and infiltrate the robot society. When they find Bender, they discover that Bender has made himself an idol among the other robots out of frustration of feeling unappreciated by his crew. Fry and Leela are captured, but Bender refuses to kill his friends. They soon learn that the planet's government is merely using humans as a scapegoat to distract the population from a valuable lug nut shortage. The three escape the planet and Bender, remembering he forgot to deliver the package, drops it onto the robots chasing them, revealing a shower of lug nuts and causing the robots to renounce their human-hating ways.
6	6	"A Fishful of Dollars"	Ron Hughart & Gregg Vanzo	Patric M. Verrone	April 27, 1999	1ACV06	9.70
Fry checks his bank account for the first time in a thousand years and discovers that he has become a multi-billionaire thanks to compound interest. He goes on a massive spending spree and buys various 20th century artifacts, including the last unopened can of anchovies, which have gone extinct. Mom, a famous industrialist and oil tycoon, feels threatened that the anchovies' oil could be used to put her out of business, so she sends her sons to steal Fry's ATM and PIN. Fry's bank account is emptied and his 20th century artifacts are repossessed except for the anchovies, which Mom hopes Fry will sell to her. However, she stops interfering once she learns that Fry intends to serve the anchovies on a pizza to share with his friends, who end up hating it.
7	7	"My Three Suns"	Jeffrey Lynch & Kevin O'Brien	J. Stewart Burns	May 4, 1999	1ACV07	8.24
The crew are sent to make a delivery on the planet of Trisol, but Fry is stricken by extreme thirst after traveling on foot under the planet's three blazing suns and, upon arrival at the planetary palace, drinks what appears to be a bottle of water. It turns out that the "water" is in fact the emperor of the planet's liquid-based inhabitants, and Fry is declared the planet's new emperor. Before Fry's coronation, Leela tries to warn him that each of the planet's emperors have been killed and succeeded on a weekly basis, but Fry refuses to listen and Leela vows to never help him again. When the sun sets after Fry's coronation, the Trisolians begin to glow, including the previous emperor, who is still alive in Fry's stomach and orders him to be cut open and drained. Leela ultimately decides to help save Fry from being killed by beating him up, causing Fry to weep in pain and gradually cry out the emperor.
8	8	"A Big Piece of Garbage"	Susie Dietter	Lewis Morton	May 11, 1999	1ACV08	8.45
After forgetting to bring an invention to an academic symposium and being humiliated by his arch-nemesis, Ogden Wernstrom, Professor Farnsworth discovers another invention he attempted to substitute, the "Smell-O-Scope", and uses it to discover than an enormous ball of garbage that was launched into space in the year 2000 is now on a collision course back to Earth. The Planet Express crew are sent to destroy it in space with explosives, but Professor Farnsworth blunders the installation of the bomb's timer and the plan fails. In desperation, Farnsworth proposes they deflect the ball into the Sun by launching another ball of garbage into it. Fry teaches the city how to make garbage, since everyone forgot how to do so over the centuries. The plan succeeds while the new ball flies out into the Solar System, and Farnsworth regains his honor.
9	9	"Hell Is Other Robots"	Rich Moore	Eric Kaplan	May 18, 1999	1ACV09	7.39
Bender becomes addicted to electricity and ends up wrecking the Planet Express ship while steering it into an electrical storm in space, nearly killing everyone. After being confronted about his addiction, Bender realizes he has a problem and finds religion at the Temple of Robotology. He begins repenting for his evil ways, but annoys and disturbs his fellow crew members in doing so. Deciding they want the old Bender back, Fry and Leela persuade him to revert to his former self. As punishment for turning his back on his faith, Bender is sent to Robot Hell, but Fry and Leela find and save him from eternal damnation at the hands of the Robot Devil.
10	10	"A Flight to Remember"	Peter Avanzino	Eric Horsted	September 26, 1999	1ACV10	11.54
The Planet Express crew take a luxury cruise on the largest space ship ever built: the Titanic. On board, Bender meets the lovely robot Countess de la Roca. At first, he is only attracted to her for her wealth and pretends to be rich himself, but the two genuinely fall in love even after Bender's secret is exposed. Meanwhile, to avoid the advances of the Titanic's captain, Zapp, Leela pretends to be engaged to Fry. However, Amy passes herself off as Fry's girlfriend to her parents to keep them from meddling with her love life, which makes Leela jealous. Before the fake relationships are exposed, the Titanic becomes entangled in a swarm of comets as a result of Zapp changing course and is piloted into a black hole. The Planet Express crew are safely evacuated on the ship's escape pods, with the Countess sacrificing herself to save Bender's life.
11	11	"Mars University"	Bret Haaland	J. Stewart Burns	October 3, 1999	1ACV11	10.79
Fry attends Mars University with the intention of dropping out of college and becomes the roommate of Guenter, a monkey who is made intelligent by an electronium hat provided by the Professor. Fry becomes bitter rivals with Guenter and humiliates him during the parents' reception party by releasing his unintelligent, feral parents, which makes Guenter unhappy about his current lifestyle. Guenter gradually becomes stressed to the point of taking off his hat and fleeing into the Martian jungle. Fry, Leela, and Farnsworth find him and try to make him choose between an intelligent life and the life of a normal monkey, but the three are swept into a river by Bender during a raft regatta. Guenter falls off a cliff after saving the three from falling over a waterfall using the intelligence provided by his hat. The hat breaks his fall and begins working at half its usual capacity, and Guenter becomes content with his now average intelligence.
12	12	"When Aliens Attack"	Brian Sheesley	Ken Keeler	November 7, 1999	1ACV12	12.25
Earth is invaded by aliens from Omicron Persei 8, who seemingly demand the planet hand over its president. It turns out, however, that the one they are referring to is the main character of a 20th century TV show, Single Female Lawyer, the final episode of which was disrupted before it was concluded when Fry accidentally spilled beer on a control panel from the station it was broadcast from back in 1999. The Omicronians threaten Earth to broadcast the episode or be destroyed, but because no copy of the episode exists anymore, the Planet Express crew are forced to reenact it. The resulting product is crude, but with Fry's guidance, the Omicronians are satisfied with the ending and leave the partially destroyed Earth.
13	13	"Fry and the Slurm Factory"	Ron Hughart	Lewis Morton	November 14, 1999	1ACV13	12.86
Fry wins a contest that allows him and the Planet Express crew to tour the factory where his favorite soft drink, Slurm, is made. During the tour, Fry, Leela, and Bender stumble into the factory's underbelly where they discover that the drink is actually the secretion of a giant worm, the Slurm Queen, as part of a money-making plot. The Queen discovers the three and, fearing her company will be ruined if the scandal is exposed, attempts to silence them, but they escape. However, Fry cannot bring himself to ruin his favorite drink, so the Planet Express crew decide to keep the plot a secret.

== Home releases ==
The original 2002 Volume One DVD cover.

Futurama: Volume One
Set details			Special features
13 episodes; 3-disc set (DVD); 1.33:1 aspect ratio; Languages: English (Dolby Surround); Subtitles: English SDH; French; Spanish			Optional commentaries for all 13 episodes; Script for "Space Pilot 3000" with notes by David X. Cohen; Animatic for "Space Pilot 3000"; Storyboard; Deleted scenes; Season One featurette; Image gallery; Hidden movie poster easter eggs
Release dates			Optional commentaries for all 13 episodes; Script for "Space Pilot 3000" with notes by David X. Cohen; Animatic for "Space Pilot 3000"; Storyboard; Deleted scenes; Season One featurette; Image gallery; Hidden movie poster easter eggs
Region 1	Region 2	Region 4	Optional commentaries for all 13 episodes; Script for "Space Pilot 3000" with notes by David X. Cohen; Animatic for "Space Pilot 3000"; Storyboard; Deleted scenes; Season One featurette; Image gallery; Hidden movie poster easter eggs
March 25, 2003	January 28, 2002	November 27, 2002	Optional commentaries for all 13 episodes; Script for "Space Pilot 3000" with notes by David X. Cohen; Animatic for "Space Pilot 3000"; Storyboard; Deleted scenes; Season One featurette; Image gallery; Hidden movie poster easter eggs

Futurama: Volume 1
Set details			Special features
13 episodes; 3-disc set (DVD); 1.33:1 aspect ratio; Languages: English (Dolby Surround); Subtitles: English SDH; French; Spanish			Features different packaging to previous release of season, to match newer season releases.: Optional commentaries for all 13 episodes; Script for "Space Pilot 3000" with notes by David X. Cohen; Animatic for "Space Pilot 3000"; Storyboard; Deleted scenes; Season One featurette; Image gallery; Hidden movie poster easter eggs
Release dates			Features different packaging to previous release of season, to match newer season releases.: Optional commentaries for all 13 episodes; Script for "Space Pilot 3000" with notes by David X. Cohen; Animatic for "Space Pilot 3000"; Storyboard; Deleted scenes; Season One featurette; Image gallery; Hidden movie poster easter eggs
Region 1	Region 2	Region 4	Features different packaging to previous release of season, to match newer season releases.: Optional commentaries for all 13 episodes; Script for "Space Pilot 3000" with notes by David X. Cohen; Animatic for "Space Pilot 3000"; Storyboard; Deleted scenes; Season One featurette; Image gallery; Hidden movie poster easter eggs
July 17, 2012	TBA	March 13, 2013	Features different packaging to previous release of season, to match newer season releases.: Optional commentaries for all 13 episodes; Script for "Space Pilot 3000" with notes by David X. Cohen; Animatic for "Space Pilot 3000"; Storyboard; Deleted scenes; Season One featurette; Image gallery; Hidden movie poster easter eggs
