= I, Roommate =

- Futurama episode
- Episode no.: Season 1 Episode 3
- Directed by: Bret Haaland
- Written by: Eric Horsted
- Production code: 1ACV03
- Original air date: April 6, 1999

Episode features
- Opening caption: As Seen on TV
- Opening cartoon: "Baby Bottleneck" from Looney Tunes by Warner Bros. Cartoons (1946)

Episode chronology
← Previous "The Series Has Landed"	Next → "Love's Labours Lost in Space"
- Futurama season 1

"I, Roommate" is the third episode in the first season of the American animated television series Futurama. It originally aired on the Fox network in the United States on April 6, 1999. The title of the episode is a reference to collected short stories written between 1940 and 1950 by author Isaac Asimov titled I, Robot. The episode was written by Eric Horsted and directed by Bret Haaland. The plot focuses on Fry and Bender's search for an apartment after deciding to become roommates and the various difficulties they have in finding a place that is acceptable to both of them.

== Plot ==
Fry has been living in the Planet Express offices for a month, making messes, leaving food out (which attracts owls, the vermin of New New York), wasting water, and generally disrupting business. When Fry eats Professor Farnsworth's alien mummy (mistaking it for beef jerky) which Farnsworth was going to eat himself, the crew insists that Fry search for his own place to live.

Bender allows Fry to move into his robot apartment, which is little more than a two-cubic meter stall, but it soon becomes clear that Bender's cramped apartment cannot meet Fry's needs. Fry cannot even sleep properly, due to Bender repeating "kill all humans" in his sleep. The two begin a search for a living space that will satisfy them both, only to conclude that none of the properties they viewed is remotely livable. Bender and Fry then overhear that one of Farnsworth's colleagues has died, and Fry and Bender are able to lease his spacious, fully furnished apartment. Bender plans to live in the apartment's tiny closet. To the theme of The Odd Couple, Fry and Bender make themselves at home.

The two hold a housewarming party, and the guests arrive with various gifts, including a miniature fruit salad tree from Leela. When the group attempts to watch All My Circuits on the apartment's gigantic television, they discover that Bender's antenna interferes with the building's satellite reception. The landlady promptly evicts Bender. Fry decides to stay, so Bender returns to his old apartment alone. He then embarks on a self-destructive sobriety binge, eventually cutting off his own antenna in the hope that he can move back in with Fry.

When Fry realizes that a robot's antenna is vital to his self-esteem, he helps Bender locate and reattach it, and then moves back in with Bender. When Fry is concerned that his miniature fruit salad tree will not get enough light in the windowless stall, Bender replies that there is a window in the closet and opens a hidden door, revealing a complete living suite more than spacious enough for Fry. To Bender's confusion, Fry happily moves into the "closet".

== Production ==
The episode title is a spoof on the short story collection I, Robot by Isaac Asimov and the earlier short story of the same title by Eando Binder, although the plot of the episode has little to do with the original stories. According to Futurama executive producer David X. Cohen, Farnsworth's mention of the mummified remains of "Zevulon the Great," is a reference to his college roommate, Zev (according to the audio commentary). One of the apartments Fry and Bender look at is a parody of the M. C. Escher woodblock print Relativity.

== Broadcast and reception ==
After two weeks airing in the prime Sunday night time slot between The Simpsons and The X-Files this episode was the first to be shown in Futurama's regular slot on Tuesdays as part of a block consisting of four cartoon sitcoms. As expected this move resulted in a drop in the ratings for the show. The initial airing was fourth place in households with a share of 5.7/10 and third among adults 18-49 with a share of 4.0/12, a build of 18% off its lead-in King of the Hill.

Zack Handlen of The A.V. Club gave the episode a B, saying, "While the story isn’t as sharp as it could’ve been, it does provide solid structure to support some great jokes, as well as solidifying Bender and Fry’s friendship as more than just a relationship of convenience."
