= A Flight to Remember =

- Futurama episode
- Episode no.: Season 1 Episode 10
- Directed by: Peter Avanzino
- Written by: Eric Horsted
- Production code: 1ACV10
- Original air date: September 26, 1999

Episode features
- Opening caption: Filmed On Location
- Opening cartoon: "Space Station" from Clutch Cargo (1959)

Episode chronology
← Previous "Hell Is Other Robots"	Next → "Mars University"
- Futurama season 1

"A Flight to Remember" is the tenth episode in the first season of the American animated television series Futurama. It originally aired on the Fox network in the United States on September 26, 1999. The title is a reference to Walter Lord's non-fiction book about the Titanic disaster A Night to Remember. This episode was written by Eric Horsted and directed by Peter Avanzino. Dawnn Lewis guest-stars in this episode as LaBarbara Conrad. The episode is a direct parody of the 1997 film Titanic.

== Plot ==
Fry, Leela, and Bender hand their resignations to Professor Farnsworth after narrowly escaping another delivery with their lives, but reconsider when he announces that the Planet Express team will take a cruise on the maiden voyage of the largest space cruise ship ever built: the Titanic. As they board they are stopped by Zapp Brannigan, the ship's honorary captain. Attempting to avoid Brannigan's advances, Leela claims she is engaged to Fry. Bender meets the Countess de la Roca. Amy unexpectedly runs into her parents, who attempt to set Amy up with a date. Amy claims Fry is her boyfriend, making Leela jealous.

Bender meets the Countess again and falls in love with her. She learns Bender is a broke low-life, but tells him that she is not interested in his wealth; she loves him for his personality. Hermes is urged to participate in a limbo competition, but declines, still recovering from guilt over an incident that occurred at the 2980 Olympics where a child trying to emulate him fatally broke his spine. Leela and Fry are invited to dine at the captain's table. At dinner, both Brannigan and Amy's parents are present; they demand that Fry kiss his date. Before the fake relationships are exposed, Kif calls Brannigan to the bridge; a new course Brannigan chose has endangered the ship.

Brannigan pilots the ship too close to a black hole. Realizing the danger, Brannigan promotes Kif to Captain before fleeing the ship. Fry and Leela nearly kiss before they are interrupted by the ship breaking in half. Bender heads off to save the countess while the rest of the crew head for the escape pods. An airlock door closes, blocking their escape. Zoidberg holds it open a few inches, but the door release is on the other side. Hermes limbos under the door. Arriving at the escape pods, they meet Amy's parents, who have found Amy a new boyfriend: Kif. After waiting as long as they can for Bender, the crew launches the escape pod. Bender leaps from the Titanic, Countess in tow. He grabs the escape pod, but they exceed the weight limit. The Countess sacrifices herself, allowing the others to escape, upsetting Bender. Entering the pod, a heartbroken Bender says he will have her diamond bracelet to remind him of her. Hermes examines it and tells Bender that it is fake, causing him to immediately break down and cry.

== Production ==
This episodes features the beginning of the relationship between Kif Kroker and Amy Wong. The relationship was originally meant to be a one–off joke; however, the writers found it to be convenient and used it in later episodes. Recurring characters Leo and Inez Wong, and LaBarbara Conrad are first introduced in the episode.

== Reception ==
Zack Handlen of The A.V. Club gave the episode a B+, stating, "...Enough of these jokes land to keep the storyline moving (the Love Boat riff was a nice touch), and the advantage of an episode like this one, which has so much going on at once, is that nothing really overstays its welcome. That also means that there’s no time to dig deep into any single story, but given the general, genial shallowness of all this, that’s probably for the best."
