= When Aliens Attack =

- Futurama episode
- Episode no.: Season 1 Episode 12
- Directed by: Brian Sheesley
- Written by: Ken Keeler
- Production code: 1ACV12
- Original air date: November 7, 1999

Episode features
- Opening caption: Proudly Made On Earth
- Opening cartoon: "Daffy – The Commando" from Looney Tunes by Warner Bros. Cartoons (1943)

Episode chronology
← Previous "Mars University"	Next → "Fry and the Slurm Factory"
- Futurama season 1

"When Aliens Attack" is the twelfth episode in the first season of the American animated television series Futurama. It originally aired on Fox in the United States on November 7, 1999. This episode was written by Ken Keeler and directed by Brian Sheesley. The episode features an attack by aliens from Omicron Persei 8, when their leader, Lrrr, is outraged when the final episode of the series, Single Female Lawyer, is interrupted by technical difficulties caused by the clumsiness of Fry in 1999.

== Plot ==
The episode opens in the year 1999, with Fry making a pizza delivery to the control booth of WNYW, New York's Fox flagship station. While there, Fry spills beer on the console (later in the episode, Amy did some research, saying it was soda), interrupting the broadcast of Single Female Lawyer (a spoof of Ally McBeal). As the technician panics, Fry ominously states, "Like anyone on Earth cares." The camera pulls back from the broadcast tower, away from Earth and through the depths of space, settling on Omicron Persei 8, a thousand light-years away and a thousand years later. Incensed that they do not get to see the end of the episode, the Omicronians launch an invasion fleet.

Back on Earth in the year 3000, the off-duty Planet Express crew decides to take a trip to Monument Beach for Labor Day, where most of the world's monuments have stood since the 27th century thanks to the activities of New New York's supervillain governor, when the Omicronians begin to invade, destroying them all one after another. Their leader, Lrrr, demands that the Earth produce "the one called McNeal". President McNeal, fearing for his own safety, orders Zapp Brannigan to lead an assault against the Omicronians, enlisting the Planet Express crew and thousands of other ships, and turning on the Robot's patriotism circuits, to Bender's annoyance. However, they only succeed in blowing up the Hubble Space Telescope while suffering heavy casualties: the fleet stands no chance against the Omicronians' actual mothership. After the attack predictably ends in disaster, Earth's government hands over President McNeal. Lrrr announces that he is the wrong McNeal and vaporizes him, then proceeds to show the world a photo of the McNeal they want, with Fry recognizing her as Jenny McNeal, the title character of Single Female Lawyer. The Omicronians demand the broadcast of the television show, or they will destroy the Earth. Unfortunately, most videotapes were destroyed in 2443, during the second coming of Jesus. The Planet Express crew decides to fake the series in order to save the world.

Fry's script comes up short (he explains that it took an hour to write, so he assumed it would take an hour to perform), and Leela (as Jenny), is forced to improvise. She proposes marriage to the judge (played by Professor Farnsworth). During a commercial break, an aggravated Fry tells Leela that people do not watch television for clever and unexpected situations because they get scared and confused by the unfamiliar and the unexpected, to which Lrrr makes a public statement backing up Fry's assertion. Fry quickly writes an ending where Farnsworth dies (even though Farnsworth does not know what was going on and tests his pulse), leaving Jenny McNeal as a single female lawyer again. The Omicronians, satisfied with the ending, give the episode a C+, saying the series was good enough for them to spare the planet, though not good enough for them to give humans their secret to immortality, to which Fry blames Zoidberg for his "overacting". The episode ends with the aliens departing Earth to watch a 1000-year-old Jay Leno monologue and Fry stating that the secret to a successful television series is that everything ends up back to normal at the end of each episode. Ironically, the camera pans out to a view of New New York burning in ruins.

== Production ==
The broadcast of Single Female Lawyer takes 1000 years to reach Omicron Persei 8, but the Omicronians are able to travel to Earth in much less time. In the DVD commentary for this episode, executive producer David X. Cohen explains that the writers had decided that the speed of light would be increased in the future and that massive particles would still not be able to travel faster than light, but that electromagnetic waves from the past would still travel at their regular, lower speed.

Though his coworker Linda appears, Morbo is absent from this episode. According to the DVD commentary, the writers try to avoid putting Morbo into episodes that have a large focus on aliens. They also discuss the similarities of Morbo's voice to that of Lrrr.

== Cultural references ==
The title of the episode is a parody of When Animals Attack!, which was a popular Fox program in the mid-1990s.

As the Planet Express ship intercepts the Omicron mothership, Fry compares himself to Uhura, Captain Janeway, and Xena, while dressed as Red Squadron leader Garven Dreis from the Star Wars franchise. The following scene then parodies the Battle of Yavin from Star Wars: Episode IV – A New Hope.

The show Single Female Lawyer, as well as Earth President McNeal, is a reference to Ally McBeal, a popular contemporary Fox program.

The spaceship destroying the White House at Monument Beach is a reference to the film Independence Day.

The anthology series Tales from the Darkside featured a similar plot-line in episode 31, "Distant Signals", where aliens who have been viewing a cancelled TV show come to Earth 20 years after the show's demise in order to ensure the unresolved plot-lines of the show are resolved by filming a last episode.

== Reception ==
Zack Handlen of The A.V. Club gave the episode an A−, stating, "The show’s writers aren’t trying to change the way people approach the medium. They’re just finding humor by acknowledging truths that typically go unspoken. Sure, the last shot shows a city laid to waste by the invaders, in direct contradiction to the usual 'and everything was the same in the end' conclusion that Fry is praising, but it’s not like the destruction is going to carry over into next week. As satire goes, this is more of a resigned guffaw than a scream."
