= Slurm =

Slurm may refer to:

- Slurm Workload Manager, a free and open-source job scheduler for Linux and similar computers, named for the Futurama drink
- Slurm (Futurama), a fictional soft drink in the Futurama universe
