= Eric Horsted =

American television writer

Eric Horsted is an American television writer. He has written for several shows, including Home Improvement, Coach, Futurama, Fanboy & Chum Chum, Out of Jimmy's Head and The Simpsons.

He is a graduate of the University of Texas at Austin.

== Writing credits ==
=== Coach ===
- "About Face"
- "Uneasy Riders"
- "The Devil in Mrs. Burleigh"
- "Something Old, Something New"
- "My Best Friend's Girl"
- "Jailbirds"
- "The Walk-On"
- "Kelly's New Guy: Part 1"
- "Fool for Lunch"
- "Dauber's Vehicle"
- "Somebody's Baby"

=== Fanboy & Chum Chum ===
- "The Janitor Strikes Back"
- "Fanboy Stinks"
- "I, Fanbot"
- "Chimp Chomp Chumps"
- "Precious Pig"
- "Monster in the Mist"
- "Night Morning"
- "Secret Shopper"
- "Little Glop of Horrors"
- "Refill Madness"
- "The Tell-Tale Toy"
- "Sigmund the Sorcerer"
- "Strings Attached"
- "Fanbidextrous"
- "Saving Private Chum Chum"
- "Jingle Fever"
- "The Incredible Chulk"
- "The Great Bicycle Mystery"
- "A Bopwork Orange"

=== Futurama ===
- "I, Roommate"
- "A Flight to Remember"
- "The Lesser of Two Evils"
- "Bender Gets Made"
- "War Is the H-Word"
- "Bendless Love"
- "Bendin' in the Wind"
- "A Taste of Freedom"
- Bender's Game
- "Lethal Inspection"
- "The Mutants Are Revolting"
- "Yo Leela Leela"
- "The Bots and the Bees"
- "Near-Death Wish"
- "Leela and the Genestalk"
- "Stench and Stenchibility"
- "Children of a Lesser Bog"
- "The One Amigo"
- "Wicked Human"
- "Late Bloomers"
- "Oceans Three" (Phil Again's Island)

=== Reba ===
- "Someone's at Gyno with Reba"
- "Vanny Dearest"

=== The Simpsons ===
- "Orange Is the New Yellow"

=== Disenchantment ===
- "Swamp and Circumstance"
- "Love's Slimy Embrace"
