= Mars University =

- Futurama episode
- Episode no.: Season 1 Episode 11
- Directed by: Bret Haaland
- Written by: J. Stewart Burns
- Production code: 1ACV11
- Original air date: October 3, 1999

Episode features
- Opening caption: Transmitido en Martian en SAP
- Opening cartoon: "Pigs in a Polka" from Merrie Melodies by Warner Bros. Cartoons (1943)

Episode chronology
← Previous "A Flight to Remember"	Next → "When Aliens Attack"
- Futurama season 1

"Mars University" is the eleventh episode in the first season of the American animated television series Futurama. It originally aired on the Fox network in the United States on October 3, 1999. This episode was written by J. Stewart Burns and directed by Bret Haaland.

== Plot ==
While delivering a crate to Professor Farnsworth's office at Mars University, Fry finds out that his 20th century college dropout status is equivalent to only a 31st-century high-school dropout. Knowing this, he vows to enroll, and drop out all over again. Fry gets a room in the financial aid dorm, and finds his roommate Guenter is an intelligent monkey wearing an undersized hat. Farnsworth reveals that Guenter was the content of the crate that they delivered, and that the electronium hat is the source of Guenter's intelligence.

While touring the campus, Bender comes across a chapter of his old fraternity, Epsilon Rho Rho (Err). The nerdy fraternity brothers beg Bender for his help in the art of being cool so they can restore their reputation. After Bender and the Robot House boys climb a ladder to peek in a girls' dorm window, a risque mishap happens when Bender's extendable eyes causes them to fall, crushing Snooty House's servants' quarters and presumably the servants themselves. Bender and the Robot House members get called before Dean Vernon, who places them on dodecatuple secret probation. Robot House enters the fraternity raft regatta in a bid to lift their probation status.

At the parents' reception, Fry humiliates Guenter by releasing Guenter's unintelligent, feral parents from their cage. Later, Guenter expresses his unhappiness at his current life. At the 20th century history exam, the stress finally becomes too much for him, and he tosses the hat aside, jumps out the window, and flees into the Martian jungle. Fry, Leela and Farnsworth track Guenter down, where Farnsworth offers him the hat, and Fry offers him a banana. Before Guenter can decide, Robot House speeds past with Bender on water skis. The boat's wake drags the humans into the river and towards a waterfall. Guenter puts the hat on and rescues them, but falls off a cliff. The Planet Express crew rush to save him and find him unharmed as the hat broke his fall and is now only working at half-capacity. Guenter announces that he likes the new reduced-capacity hat, and that he has decided to transfer to business school, to Farnsworth's horror.

While Fry successfully drops out of college and returns to Planet Express, Guenter obtains his MBA at business school and eventually becomes the FOX Network's latest CEO. Robot House wins the regatta, and a parade in their honor is held, led by an unhappy Vernon, who then goes on one date with Leela, only to never call her back. With his task done, Bender steals everything of value from Robot House and runs off.

== Reception ==
In a review of the episode, Space.com criticized Futurama for the disconnectedness of the episodes and the lack of a large recurring cast and questioned the time spent in developing Günter's character when it is unlikely that he will return as a major character. The episode itself was praised for its references to classic frat films such as Animal House and Revenge of the Nerds, though the reference to Lite-Brite was found to be lacking. Zack Handlen of The A.V. Club gave the episode a B+, stating, "Even with a plot as fundamentally absurd as this one, the writers still manage to find some authenticity. That makes a for a good half-hour of television, even if it’s not one I have a lot to say about." In 2006 IGN ranked this episode as number 21 in their list of the top 25 Futurama episodes. The episode was initially ranked higher in the list, particularly for its many references to Animal House and its appeal to fans of the film; it was eventually moved to 21st place and replaced by episodes which were perceived as having better storytelling.

== Cultural references ==
Much of the plot references scenes from Animal House – Robot House takes the place of Delta House, and the school is headed by "Dean Vernon" instead of "Dean Vernon Wormer"; Delta House's "double secret probation" becomes Robot House's "dodecatuple secret probation", and so on. There are also references to Good Will Hunting. When Professor Farnsworth is lecturing on the effects of quantum neutrino fields, the blackboard behind him displays an explanation of "Superdupersymmetric String Theory" and a diagram explaining "Witten's Dog". Witten's Dog, named after Ed Witten, is a parody of the classic Schroedinger's Cat paradox. Astrophysicist David Schiminovich created both the equations and the diagram, based on "an equation that constrains the mass density of neutrinos in the universe".
