= Fry and the Slurm Factory =

- Futurama episode
- Episode no.: Season 1 Episode 13
- Directed by: Ron Hughart
- Written by: Lewis Morton
- Production code: 1ACV13
- Original air date: November 14, 1999

Guest appearance
- Pamela Anderson as Dixie

Episode features
- Opening caption: Live From Omicron Persei 8
- Opening cartoon: The Simpsons shorts – "Making Faces" (1987)

Episode chronology
← Previous "When Aliens Attack"	Next → "I Second That Emotion"
- Futurama season 1

"Fry and the Slurm Factory" is the thirteenth and final episode in the first season of the American animated television series Futurama. It originally aired on the Fox network in the United States on November 14, 1999. The episode was directed by Ron Hughart and written by Lewis Morton. Pamela Anderson guest stars as the voice of one of the Slurm party girls. Series supervising director Rich Moore described the episode as a seminal Futurama episode "where both the writing and visuals really started to click."

== Plot ==
The episode opens with an advertisement for Slurm, a popular intergalactic beverage. The makers of Slurm are announcing a contest: Whoever finds a golden bottle cap inside a can of Slurm wins a free trip to the Slurm plant, a tour of the Slurm Factory, and a party with popular Slurm mascot Slurms McKenzie. Fry resolves to find the bottle cap by drinking massive quantities of Slurm. Meanwhile, Bender is sick with a high fever (900 °F); Professor Farnsworth uses this as an excuse to test his experimental "F-ray", a flashlight-like device that enables the user to look through anything. He reveals that a watch that belongs to Amy Wong, caught in one of Bender's cogs, is causing the fever.

After repairing Bender, the Professor leaves the F-ray in the custody of Fry and Bender who use it to scan Slurm cans for the golden bottle cap. After checking "90,000" cans, they give up on finding the winning one. Fry settles in to relax with a Slurm and chokes on the winning bottle cap. The Planet Express crew arrives at the Slurm plant on Wormulon. After meeting Slurms McKenzie, they take a tour down a river of Slurm through the factory and see the Grunka-Lunkas manufacture Slurm. Fry tries to drink the Slurm from the river, but falls off the boat and does not know how to swim. Leela dives in to save him, and Bender joins them, because "Everybody else was doing it."

The three are sucked into a whirlpool and deposited in a cave under the factory. They discover that the factory they toured was a fake. They enter the real factory and discover Slurm's true nature: It is a secretion from a giant worm, the Slurm Queen. They are discovered and captured by the worms. Bender is placed into a machine designed to turn him into Slurm cans. Leela is lowered by crane into a vat of royal Slurm, which will turn her into a Slurm Queen. Fry is fed ultra-addictive "super-slurm" so that he cannot resist "eating until he explodes". Fry drags the tub of super-slurm to the crane controls so he can save Leela while continuing to drink.

A freed Leela saves Bender slightly too late, leaving Bender with a hole through the side of his torso. Leela then saves Fry by dumping the super-slurm down a drainage grate. They escape, but are pursued by the Slurm Queen. Slurms McKenzie, exhausted from his years of partying, arrives and sacrifices himself to save Fry, Leela, his two supermodels, and Bender. When they escape, the Slurm Queen yells that the company is ruined by the discovery of the secret. Professor Farnsworth contacts a government agent to reveal the secret of Slurm. However, Fry is so addicted to Slurm that he tells the government agent that "grampa's making up crazy stories again" so it can continue to be produced. In the end, the entire Planet Express crew holds a toast to Slurms McKenzie and to Slurm.

== Broadcast and reception ==
In its initial airing, the episode placed 45th in the Nielsen ratings for primetime shows for the week of November 8–14, 1999.

Zack Handlen of The A.V. Club gave the episode an A−, remarking that the episode works well independent of the parody but is "often gratifyingly specific in a way that rewards viewers who are familiar with the film". In 2006, IGN listed the episode as number three in their list of the top 25 Futurama episodes, calling it the "most memorable" of the series. As of 2023, episode is number 21 on IGN's list. In 2013, the episode was 17th in Paste's list of the 20 Best Episodes of Futurama.

== Cultural references ==
The episode, including its title, is a parody of the novel Charlie and the Chocolate Factory by Roald Dahl and its film adaptation Willy Wonka & the Chocolate Factory. The characters whom the factory paid to pretend to be workers, the Grunka Lunkas, resemble the Oompa-Loompas from the film version of Willy Wonka & the Chocolate Factory and the tour guide, Glurmo, also wears a Willy Wonka-like attire, and speaks in a Gene Wilder-like voice.

Slurms McKenzie, the Slurm party worm, is a parody of Spuds MacKenzie, the Bud Light spokesdog.

Professor Farnsworth's F-Ray reveals a 6502 microprocessor — a widely-used CPU in home computers of the 1970s and early 1980s — in Bender's head. Head writer David X. Cohen chose the 6502 from having developed software in assembly language for the CPU.

When Leela is being dipped in royal Slurm to make her into a new Slurm Queen, Glurmo says, "But your highness, she's a commoner. Her Slurm will taste foul." The Slurm Queen replies, "Yes, which is why we'll market it as New Slurm. Then, when everyone hates it, we'll bring back Slurm Classic, and make billions!" This is a reference to the conspiracy theories around New Coke.

The beverage Slurm has many similarities to the short-lived soft drink Surge that was popular around the time of production, which included the hard-core image that advertised it. Slurm could also be a parody of Mountain Dew, which has similar imagery for its advertisement. Slurm's green color also resembles Mountain Dew.

== Slurm ==
Slurm posters were one of the first clues to deciphering the alien languages in the series and were meant to act in a manner similar to the Rosetta Stone for dedicated fans. Slurm is referenced in the Marvel Comics title Young Avengers written by Allan Heinberg. In the Young Avengers Special, the character Hulkling is shown attacking the Shocker using a Slurm vending machine. In 2008 Twentieth Century Fox filed to trademark Slurm, either with the intent of releasing a branded beverage or possibly to prevent others from doing so.
