= Mother's Day (Futurama) =

- Futurama episode
- Episode no.: Season 2 Episode 14
- Directed by: Brian Sheesley
- Written by: Lewis Morton
- Production code: 2ACV14
- Original air date: May 14, 2000

Episode features
- Opening caption: Larva-Tested, Pupa-Approved
- Opening cartoon: "Bold King Cole" (1936)

Episode chronology
← Previous "Bender Gets Made"	Next → "The Problem with Popplers"
- Futurama season 2

"Mother's Day" is the fourteenth episode in the second season of the American animated television series Futurama, and the 27th episode of the series overall. It originally aired on the Fox network in the United States on May 14, 2000.

== Plot ==
Every Mother's Day, robots made in Mom's Friendly Robot Company factories around the world give gifts, money, and cards to the owner of the corporation, Mom. Despite extensively promoting the holiday, Mom actually hates the day and is in an even more bitter mood this year, remembering a romantic affair that had ended 70 years prior. Such doomed romance had been with a younger Professor Hubert Farnsworth, then an employee of Mom's Friendly Robot Company. When Mom insisted that the Professor's latest design, a children's toy named Q.T. McWhiskers, be changed to an eight-foot-tall death machine to be sold on the intergalactic arms market, the Professor, enraged, stormed out of the room, and they had not seen each other since.

In revenge, Mom attempts to become the "supreme overlord of Earth" for this Mother's Day, ordering the entire robot population of the planet to rebel and overthrow humanity through a control that transmits to every robot's antenna. Wishing to end the robot rebellion and save humanity, Mom's three sons, Walt, Larry, and Igner, cooperate with the Planet Express crew to obtain the robot control Mom keeps in her bra. Their plan is to bring Mom to her rustic cabin near New New York, have the Professor seduce her, remove her bra, and use the control to end the rebellion.

When the Professor and Mom do meet at the cabin, however, their love is rekindled, and they erupt into sex. Amidst this, everyone else comes in to escape the robots, who have made their way to the cabin. In order for their romantic evening not to be interrupted, Mom decides to finally call off the rebellion. Mom dumps the Professor after learning of the initial plot. Life is then returned to normal.

== Broadcast and reception ==
In its initial airing, the episode received a Nielsen rating of 3.9/9, placing it 79th among primetime shows for the week of May 8–14, 2000. The A.V. Club gave the episode an A−.

== See also ==
- The Mitchells vs. the Machines, a film with a storyline similar this episode.
