= A Fishful of Dollars =

- Futurama episode
- Episode no.: Season 1 Episode 6
- Directed by: Ron Hughart; Gregg Vanzo
- Written by: Patric M. Verrone
- Production code: 1ACV06
- Original air date: April 27, 1999

Guest appearance
- Pamela Anderson as herself

Episode features
- Opening caption: LOADING....
- Opening cartoon: "Betty Boop's Crazy Inventions" by Fleischer Studios (1933)

Episode chronology
← Previous "Fear of a Bot Planet"	Next → "My Three Suns"
- Futurama season 1

"A Fishful of Dollars" is the sixth episode of the first season of the American animated television series Futurama. It originally aired on the Fox Network in the United States on April 27, 1999. The title of the episode is a play on the name of the 1964 film A Fistful of Dollars. The episode was written by Patric Verrone and directed by Ron Hughart and Gregg Vanzo. Pamela Anderson guest stars as her own preserved head in a jar. It marks the first appearance of the character Mom, the series' recurring antagonist.

== Plot ==
After having their dreams taken over by an advertisement, the Planet Express crew takes a trip to the local shopping mall. Trying to buy the product he saw in his dreams, Fry realizes he is broke. At the same time, Bender is arrested for shoplifting. As the crew scrounges up bail money, Fry notices that the bank where he used to have an account has remained in business. He still has his ATM card and remembers his PIN code: the price of a cheese pizza and large soda at Panucci's Pizza, where he used to work. The account had contained 93 cents in 1999, but after accruing interest at 2.25% per year for 1,000 years, the balance is now $4.3 billion.

Fry goes on a massive spending spree, buying numerous 20th century artifacts, such as Ted Danson's skeleton, an antique robot toy, videotapes of past sitcoms, and the last known tin of anchovies, which were fished to extinction shortly after the Decapodians arrived on Earth in the 23rd century. Professor Farnsworth informs Fry about their extinction after Fry's attempt to order some as a pizza topping causes a robotic waiter to explode due to a circuit overload. However, he finds himself making a rival of Mom, a famous industrialist and owner of Mom's Old-Fashioned Robot Oil. She wants to acquire the anchovies for herself since they represent a potential source of robot oil that can undercut her own product, thus putting her out of business. Mom's sons Walt, Larry, and Igner conspire with the head of Pamela Anderson to steal Fry's ATM card and PIN.

They tranquilize Fry and fool him into believing it is still the year 2000, using a crude mock-up of Panucci's to make him think he fell asleep on the job. Anderson orders a cheese pizza and a large soda, whereupon Fry inadvertently reveals his PIN as he rings up the total, which was $10.77. Walt, Larry, and Igner empty Fry's bank account, and except for the anchovies, all of his 20th century artifacts are repossessed. Mom visits Fry with the intent of buying the anchovies, but relents upon discovering that he never knew about the Robot Oil and that he plans to eat them. Fry covers a pizza with the anchovies and shares it with the rest of the Planet Express employees while Dr. Zoidberg is out of the room. The others spit out the pizza in disgust as Fry explains that anchovies are an acquired taste. When Zoidberg enters the room, he smells the anchovies and greedily devours all of the remaining pizza. He goes on to demand more, flying into a rage when he learns that there are no more anchovies anywhere, nor will there ever be.

== Cultural references ==
After Walt assumes that Fry must be a "mastermind of the highest order", the scene cuts to him watching Sanford and Son, as indicated by the theme music. The episode is a loose adaption of the novel The Sleeper Awakes by H. G. Wells, where a time traveler gains a substantial amount of money through interest. The "classical music" that Fry listens to is "Baby Got Back" by Sir Mix-a-Lot.

While cooking, Bender wears an apron that says "To Serve Man". This is a nod to the 1962 episode of The Twilight Zone with the same name.

== Broadcast and reception ==
In its initial airing, the episode received a Nielsen rating of 6.4/10, placing it 58th among primetime shows for the week of April 27 – May 2, 1999.

In 2006 this episode was ranked as 25th in IGN's list of the Top 25 Futurama episodes. The episode was chosen to be included in the list in part due to its many jokes about the 1970s and 1980s. Zack Handlen of The A.V. Club gave the episode a B−, stating, "...Fry’s journey from 'desperate to replicate the past' to 'happy about the present' rings about as true as the Not At All True Bell, and you have the makings of a fitfully funny, subpar half hour. Even the resolution is lazy: laying on the curb with no money, Fry dreams of Bender and Leela lecturing him on how he was a terrible friend. It’s an ugly, undynamic fantasy that flat out explains the supposed moral of the story."
