= Religion in Futurama =

Themes of religion in the series Futurama

The animated science fiction television program Futurama makes a number of satirical references to religion.

The symbol of Robotology is based on the electronic symbol for a resistor used in electrical circuit diagrams.

== Overview ==
Religion is a prominent part of society, although the dominant religions have evolved. A merging of the major religious groups of the 20th century has resulted in the First Amalgamated Church, while Voodoo is now mainstream. New religions include Oprahism, “Robotology”, and the banned religion of Star Trek fandom. Religious figures include Father Changstein-El-Gamal, the Robot Devil, Reverend Lionel Preacherbot, and passing references to the Space Pope, who appears to be a large crocodile-like creature. Several major holidays have robots associated with them, including the murderous Robot Santa, Kwanzaa-bot and (in a couple of appearances) Hanukah Zombie. While very few episodes focus exclusively on religion within the Futurama universe, they do cover a wide variety of subjects including predestination, prayer, the nature of salvation, and religious conversion.

== Robotology ==
The episode "Hell Is Other Robots" centers around Bender's discovering the religion of Robotology to help him break an addiction. Robotology is a play on the name Scientology. Mark Pinsky, in The Gospel According to the Simpsons, comments that the story in the episode reflects several common real-life occurrences when somebody joins a religion, including their loved ones being skeptical of the new faith but accepting it inasmuch as it serves as a vehicle for personal improvement, the new convert proselytizing to gain additional followers for their religion and unintentionally alienating their friends in the process, and attempts by others to get them to abandon their recently-acquired convictions.

== See also ==
- Religion in The Simpsons
