= Lethal Inspection =

- Futurama episode
- Episode no.: Season 6 Episode 6
- Directed by: Ray Claffey
- Written by: Eric Horsted
- Production code: 6ACV06
- Original air date: July 22, 2010

Episode features
- Opening caption: Made you look!

Episode chronology
← Previous "The Duh-Vinci Code"	Next → "The Late Philip J. Fry"
- Futurama season 6

"Lethal Inspection" is the sixth episode in the sixth season of the American animated television series Futurama, and the 94th episode of the series overall. It originally aired on Comedy Central in the United States on July 22, 2010. In the episode Bender learns that he suffers from a terminal manufacturing defect, effectively rendering him mortal. Bender must cope with his newfound mortality and enlists Hermes Conrad's help to track down the mysterious quality inspector, Inspector No. 5, whom he blames for allowing him to enter the world only to die.

The episode was written by Eric Horsted and directed by Ray Claffey. From June 8 to June 15, as part of its "Countdown to Futurama" event, Comedy Central Insider, Comedy Central's news outlet, released various preview materials for the episode, including a storyboard of Bender's and Hermes's entry into the Central Bureaucracy and character designs for the war reenactment sequence. "Lethal Inspection" received positive reviews from critics, who viewed the emotional ending to be a return to form that the season had been missing.

== Plot ==
After a reenactment of the "Sith-al War", Bender touts his perfection and "immortality", specifically citing his ability to download a backup copy of himself into a new working body should anything happen to his present one. Bender soon discovers that he suffers from a terminal manufacturing defect: he is built without a backup unit, making him mortal. He is devastated by the revelation of his mortality and of Inspector No. 5, believing the inspector's careless error resulted in him being sent out into the world only to die. He becomes determined to find Inspector No. 5 and demand an answer to why he allowed Bender to exist despite his fatal flaw.

Hermes agrees to help Bender in his quest to discover the identity of Inspector No. 5, which is locked in the Central Bureaucracy. While at the Central Bureaucracy, Hermes logs into the computer system with his ID to look up Inspector No. 5's records. However, he and Bender find that the electronic record on Inspector No. 5 has been deleted and that the physical file is also missing. Bender calls Mom's Friendly Robot Company, who created him, and tells her he is defective. Mom attempts to have Bender destroyed to cover up the existence of a defective robot. The two flee from Mom's Killbots by train and arrive in Tijuana—where Bender was manufactured.

The original manufacturing plant is abandoned, but Bender finds an old directory listing Inspector No. 5's address. However, upon reaching the home, they also find it abandoned. Realizing that he may never find the answers he seeks, Bender is forced to confront the reality of death. Hermes consoles him, telling him that now life is precious and he should not spend it bitter and angry. The two bond but are soon interrupted by the arrival of the Killbots, who begin shooting into the house. Hermes tells Bender to flee while he attempts to hack into Inspector No. 5's old Central Bureaucracy computer. Successful, Hermes uploads false information to the Killbots claiming Bender has been eliminated, which ends their pursuit, before narrowly escaping the burning house.

Leela has been asked to file incoming papers in Hermes's absence. However, Leela proves to be inept at the job, hiding many incomprehensible alien-language papers in plants in the building. By the time Bender and Hermes return from Tijuana, the place is in complete chaos, with Scruffy attempting to cook Zoidberg and the ship being repossessed. Hermes quickly returns Planet Express to good condition in one hour, burning many of the foreign papers in the fireplace, which he assures Leela he often does to make his job easier. Bender goes out to celebrate his new outlook on life with the other crew members. When the others have left, Hermes reveals and burns a personnel file whose cover falls away to reveal that he was Inspector No. 5. A flashback reveals that young Hermes overrode the "defective" assessment on Bender to save the infant robot from being scrapped, then resigned from Mom's Friendly Robot Company immediately afterward. Hermes's personnel file was deleted, and he stole his own physical file from the Central Bureaucracy during his and Bender's mission; the computer at the Tijuana house was his own, so he did not have to hack into it. In the present, Hermes smiles quietly over the burning file, happy in knowing he did the right thing.

== Production ==
The bureaucrat's offices are laid out in reference to a Rubik's Cube (pictured).

From June 8 to June 15, as part of its 2010 "Countdown to Futurama" event, Comedy Central Insider, Comedy Central's news outlet, released various preview materials for the episode, including a storyboard of Bender's and Hermes's entry into the Central Bureaucracy and character designs for the war reenactment sequence. The episode is one of the few times where Hermes plays a major role and is key to the plot. The episode ends with "Little Bird, Little Bird", an American children's song, performed by Elizabeth Mitchell.

The cultural references in the episode include when Hermes and Bender enter "cubicle room 729", with cubicles set up in groups of nine, three rows across and three columns down. In order to get to Hermes's cubicle, the group rotates right and left and up and down in the same fashion as a Rubik's Cube. When Hermes's cubicle stops, he says, "This is mine, right next to the center square," also referencing the game show Hollywood Squares. The bureaucrat next to Hermes makes a comment and a red 'X' pops up on his desk. This is a reference to actor and comedian Paul Lynde, who was the regular "center square" on the show.

The episode deals with the concept of realizing one's mortality and discovering that life is more precious because of it. Learning that he is in fact not immortal as he once thought, Bender initially feels that living a life that is anything less than immortal is worthless. He deals with the devastating news of his newfound mortality by trying to find the one person who he believes can answer his questions about the reason for his life and why he was allowed to "be born" only to die. Though Bender cannot find the answers to his mortality, he ultimately ends up developing a new outlook on life, believing it to be more precious than it was before now that it is finite, and he resolves that life is worth living no matter how brief it is.

== Reception ==
"Lethal Inspection" originally aired on July 22, 2010 on Comedy Central. In its original American broadcast, it was viewed by an estimated 1.920 million viewers. The episode had a 1.3 rating/2% share in Nielsen ratings and a 0.9 rating/3% share in the 18–49 demographic, meaning 1.3% of households with televisions were watching the episode and 2% of television viewers during the half-hour were watching this episode. "Lethal Inspection" was down two tenths of a point from the previous week's episode "The Duh-Vinci Code".

The episode received acclaim from critics. Zack Handlen of The A.V. Club gave it an A−, praising the unlikely pairing of Bender and Hermes, writing: "If I had to name a character on the show least likely to pluck at my heartstrings, Bender and Hermes would be near the top of the list...and yet they pulled it off. I'm not sure if Baby Bender violates continuity or not, but I don't care. It worked." Handlen called the episode "more thoughtful" and also felt that the episode provided depth and growth to both Bender and Hermes without compromising characterization. In the case of Hermes, Handlen stated, "Hermes can be an obsessive, number-loving accountant, and still have that memory of his younger self saving Baby Bender from the trash heap. It works because the twist is the discovery of compassion in someone we liked and wanted to love." Danny Gallagher of TVSquad felt that the episode marked the return of the Futurama's "true sense of emotion," comparing it to previous episodes like season four's "Jurassic Bark". In particular, Gallagher noted the highly effective use of the Central Bureaucracy, stating that it allowed the show to use a Douglas Adams-feel. Merrill Bar of Film School Rejects stated that the episode worked "99.9%" and that it recovered what he felt had been lacking from the previous episodes of season six. While he disliked the opening Star Wars gag, he felt that the rest of the episode made up for it, stating that "Lethal Inspection" was "by far, the funniest episode since the shows[sic] return. If the writers can keep this up, then my faith will have been fully restored."

Robert Canning of IGN was also pleased with the episode, noting that Hermes's and Bender's team-up worked well and that the ending was cathartic. He found the episode to be his favorite of the new season, giving it a 9/10 and stating, "after an okay start, [it] turned out to be my favorite episode of this comeback season so far. The more I think about it, the more pleasure I find in it. It was an episode full of laughs, action and the kind of emotional tug the series has been missing of late." Sean Gandert of Paste gave the episode a rating of 8.7/10 and wrote: "Judging from this episode and the last it seems like Futurama is intentionally straying away from its old groupings and trying new things. The sixth season is moving off from the repetition of its first two episodes and is all the better for it." Though he felt the episode was weaker with its jokes, he noted that this "is frequently the case in with episodes that deal more with the characters and less about making jokes in a wacky world. But this isn't something I think will bother real fans, as that's part of what's given Futurama its cult audience in the first place: that the show gives a damn about its characters."

== See also ==
- Death
- Stages of grief
