= A Big Piece of Garbage =

- Futurama episode
- Episode no.: Season 1 Episode 8
- Directed by: Susie Dietter
- Written by: Lewis Morton
- Production code: 1ACV08
- Original air date: May 11, 1999

Guest appearances
- Ron Popeil as himself; Nancy Cartwright as Bart Simpson doll (uncredited)

Episode features
- Opening caption: Mr. Bender's Wardrobe by ROBOTANY 500
- Opening cartoon: Elmer Fudd in "A Corny Concerto" from Merrie Melodies by Warner Bros. Cartoons (1943)

Episode chronology
| ← Previous "My Three Suns" | Next → "Hell Is Other Robots" |
- Futurama season 1

"A Big Piece of Garbage" is the eighth episode in the first season of the American animated television series Futurama. It originally aired on the Fox network in the United States on 11 May 1999. The episode was written by Lewis Morton and directed by Susie Dietter. Ron Popeil guest stars in this episode as himself. Nancy Cartwright also has a brief cameo as a Bart Simpson doll. Much of the episode is a spoof of the 1998 film Armageddon; however, instead of Earth being threatened by an asteroid, it is threatened by a giant ball of garbage.

== Plot ==
Professor Farnsworth invites the crew of Planet Express to join him at the Academy of Inventors' annual symposium, where inventors display their latest creations. He will be presenting his invention, the Deathclock, which displays the date of a person's death after that person's finger is stuck into the machine. At the symposium, the crew encounter one of Farnsworth's bitter former students, Professor Ogden Wernstrom. Wernstrom presents his invention, a reverse SCUBA suit that allows fish to breathe water while walking about on land, then taunts Farnsworth over his invention from the previous year—the Deathclock.

Mortified that he had previously presented the device and forgotten about it, Farnsworth hastily begins drawing on a napkin. He presents the drawing, which depicts a Smelloscope, a device that allows people to smell distant cosmic objects, but is humiliated when he smears the drawing. Back at Planet Express, Farnsworth invites everybody to see the Smelloscope that he had constructed last year and also forgotten about. Fry begins smelling objects around the Solar System and quickly discovers a foul-smelling meteor. After calculating its trajectory, Farnsworth announces that the object will collide with New New York City in 72 hours, reducing it to a "stinky crater".

After some research, they find a video that reveals the object to be a giant ball of garbage from Old New York, launched into space in 2052. After warning Mayor Poopenmayer, a plan is hatched to destroy the garbage ball. The Planet Express crew is sent on a mission to plant a bomb on the ball. Then, once activated, the bomb will be set to allow the crew twenty-five minutes to escape. Farnsworth also reminds them that if it blew up any time later, the explosion would cause garbage to rain across the entire Earth, killing millions.

Unfortunately, after starting the bomb, they find out the Professor put the bomb's countdown display in upside down, and it actually only allows 52 seconds. The crew panics, and Bender throws the bomb into space to save them, where it explodes harmlessly. Wernstrom makes several demands before quickly leaving. In a last-ditch effort to redeem himself, Farnsworth comes up with a second plan to save the city: launching a second ball of garbage to bounce against the first one and sending it flying into the sun.

Fry leads the city to quickly generate a second ball of garbage, which is fired at the first garbage ball. The rocket flies into the air and hits the other garbage ball, which slingshots around planets into the sun, while the new ball flies out of the solar system. For saving the city from the garbage ball, Professor Farnsworth is given the inventor's award, which was confiscated from Wernstrom as his punishment for abandoning everyone. Leela's concerns that the new garbage ball will return and destroy a future generation are quickly dismissed, as the new ball should not return for hundreds of years.

== Cultural references ==
The plot of the episode is a reference to the 1998 film Armageddon, in which a group of astronauts attempt to destroy an asteroid heading towards Earth with a warhead. It also references Mobro 4000, a garbage barge that originated in New York and was rejected from multiple ports in 1987.

The garbage ball contains Bart Simpson dolls that utter Bart's catchphrase "eat my shorts" to which Bender does, and later he would respond "mmm...shorts" the same way Homer Simpson does when he gets hungry.

During the end credits, Kate Smith's rendition of "We'll Meet Again" plays instead of the standard opening and closing theme music.

== Reception ==
Zack Handlen of The A.V. Club gave the episode an A−, stating, "More than anything else, 'A Big Piece Of Garbage' gives a taste of what’s to come. Other episodes will have more challenging, mind-boggling plots, and still others will find ways to move us more deeply than we thought possible from such a silly, weird little show. But this half hour is proof that the show can tell big, legitimately exciting (if utterly ridiculous) adventure stories without breaking a sweat."

This episode was nominated for an Emmy award in 1999 for Best Animated Program (For Programming One Hour or Less)". However, it lost to the King of the Hill episode "And They Call It Bobby Love".
