= Fear of a Bot Planet =

- Futurama episode
- Episode no.: Season 1 Episode 5
- Directed by: Peter Avanzino; Carlos Baeza
- Written by: Evan Gore; Heather Lombard
- Production code: 1ACV05
- Original air date: April 20, 1999

Episode features
- Opening caption: Featuring Gratuitous Alien Nudity
- Opening cartoon: Porky Pig and Bugs Bunny in "A Corny Concerto" from Merrie Melodies by Warner Bros. Cartoons (1943)

Episode chronology
| ← Previous "Love's Labours Lost in Space" | Next → "A Fishful of Dollars" |
- Futurama season 1

"Fear of a Bot Planet" is the fifth episode in the first season of the American animated television series Futurama. It originally aired on the Fox network in the United States on April 20, 1999. The episode was written by Heather Lombard and Evan Gore and directed by Peter Avanzino and Carlos Baeza with co-direction by Ashley Lenz and Chris Sauvé. The episode focuses on a delivery the Planet Express Crew must make to a robot planet named Chapek 9. The robot inhabitants hate all humans and Bender decides to join them because he is tired of robots being treated like second class citizens. The episode is a light-hearted satire on racism, an idea reinforced by the title reference.

== Plot ==
The Planet Express crew is tasked with a delivery to Chapek 9, a planet inhabited by human-hating robot separatists, so Bender is assigned to deliver the package. Bender claims that it is a robot holiday, Robanukah, and refuses to work. Hermes insists that Bender must go, on the grounds that Bender has used up his time off. After a resentful Bender is lowered to the surface, Fry and Leela decide to throw a Robanukah party for Bender to show their appreciation.

They receive a message from Bender: the robots found out he worked for humans, and he has been captured. To avoid being killed, Fry and Leela disguise themselves as robots and infiltrate the robot society. They discover Bender is playing the robots' prejudice for his own benefit, claiming he has killed billions of humans. Fry and Leela reunite with Bender, but he refuses to be rescued. Before Fry and Leela can leave, the other robots arrive, and the two are placed on trial for being human. They are found guilty of the charge and sentenced to a life of tedious robot-type labor. A trapdoor opens and they fall into a room where they meet the Robot Elders. The Elders reveal that the trial was merely a show trial, and command Bender to kill Fry and Leela, but Bender refuses, stating that the pair are his friends, and that humans pose no threat to robots.

The Robot Elders reveal that despite being aware of this, humans provide them with a scapegoat to distract the population from their problems: lug nut shortages and an incompetent government of corrupt Robot Elders. The Robot Elders decide the three know too much and must be killed. Fry threatens to breathe fire on the Robot Elders, throwing them into a state of confusion. The crew flees, pursued by a horde of robots. As the crew escapes on the winch, the robots stack on top of each other, keeping pace with the winch. Bender remembers that he never delivered the package, and puts it into the hands of the robot on top. The unbalanced tower topples to the ground. The package bursts open, showering the robots in much-needed lug nuts. The robots renounce their human-hating ways. The crew, headed back to Earth, celebrate Robanukah with Bender, who confesses the holiday is fictitious.

== Cultural references ==
The planet Chapek 9 is named after Karel Čapek, the Czech writer who is attributed with coining the term "robot" in his play R.U.R..

The plot element related to the human-hating robot planet was based on Stanisław Lem's story "The Eleventh Voyage" (of Ijon Tichy) from The Star Diaries.

== Reception ==
Zack Handlen of The A.V. Club gave the episode an A−, stating, "While the show would go on to create more consistently well-considered worlds, the depth of its cleverness is on fine display. Even better, Fry, Leela, and Bender all behave in consistent, and even somewhat illuminating ways. [...] While Futurama’s storytelling is still in its most rudimentary form, it has its central trio down cold."
