= Late bloomer (disambiguation) =

A late bloomer is a person whose talents or capabilities are not visible to others until later than usual.

Late bloomer or Late bloomers may also refer to:

- Late Bloomers (2006 film) (German: Die Herbstzeitlosen), 2006 Swiss film directed by Bettina Oberli
- Late Bloomers (2011 film), 2011 France film directed by Julie Gavras
- Late Bloomers (2023 film), 2023 American film directed by Lisa Steen
- Late Bloomer (2004 film), (Japanese: Osoi Hito), 2004 Japanese film directed by Go Shibata
- The Late Bloomer, 2016 film based on Ken Baker memoir
- Late Bloomer (TV series), a Canadian comedy television series
- Late Bloomer, 2003 album by rapper Twisted Black
- "Late Bloomer", a song from the 2014 album The Voyager by Jenny Lewis
- Late Bloomer, 2017 album by rapper Wes Period
