= Gregg Vanzo =

American animator

- Occupation: Animator
- Spouse: Nikki Vanzo

Gregg Vanzo is an American animator. He has worked on several shows, including The Simpsons and Futurama. He is also the founder of Rough Draft Studios.

== Career in television ==
Gregg Vanzo began his career as an animator on Bill Kroyer's Technological Threat, Steven Spielberg's Amazing Stories and key animator for the short Box Office Bunny before beginning work on The Simpsons in storyboards, directing, and layout artistry. From there, Vanzo became the overseas supervisor on The Critic. Vanzo went on to serve as animation executive producer for Futurama.

== Rough Draft Studios ==
In 1991, with his wife Nikki, Gregg Vanzo founded Rough Draft Studios in Glendale, California. The studio has produced animation for such shows as The Simpsons, Futurama, Disenchantment, Drawn Together, The Ren & Stimpy Show, SpongeBob SquarePants, Beavis and Butt-Head, King of the Hill, The Maxx, The Critic and many more.

Later, Rough Draft Studios opened a sister studio in Seoul, South Korea.

== Directing credits ==
=== The Simpsons episodes ===
- "There's No Disgrace Like Home" (co-directed with Kent Butterworth)

=== Futurama episodes ===
- "Space Pilot 3000" (co-directed with Rich Moore)
- "A Fishful of Dollars" (co-directed with Ron Hughart)
- "The Problem with Popplers" (co-directed with Chris Sauvé)

supervising director for season 1
