= The Series Has Landed =

- Futurama episode
- Episode no.: Season 1 Episode 2
- Directed by: Peter Avanzino
- Written by: Ken Keeler
- Production code: 1ACV02
- Original air date: April 4, 1999

Episode features
- Opening caption: In Hypno-Vision
- Opening cartoon: "Baby Bottleneck" from Looney Tunes by Warner Bros. Cartoons (1946)

Episode chronology
← Previous "Space Pilot 3000"	Next → "I, Roommate"
- Futurama season 1

"The Series Has Landed", also known as "Episode Two: The Series Has Landed", is the second episode in the first season of the American animated television series Futurama. It originally aired on the Fox network in the United States on April 4, 1999. The episode was written by Ken Keeler and directed by Peter Avanzino. In this episode, several main characters, including Doctor Zoidberg (Billy West), Amy Wong (Lauren Tom) and Hermes Conrad (Phil LaMarr), are first introduced, and the crew goes on their first mission. After completing their delivery, a series of mishaps occurs which puts Fry and Leela's lives in danger and nearly leaves all of them trapped on the Moon.

== Plot ==
Settling into their new jobs, Fry, Leela and Bender are introduced to the other Planet Express employees: Doctor John A. Zoidberg, intern Amy Wong and bureaucrat Hermes Conrad. It becomes apparent that the ship needs a captain, and Leela is chosen. On their first mission, a delivery to the Moon, Fry undergoes severe culture shock. No longer a daring voyage of exploration, lunar travel has become a day trip to a Disneyland-esque amusement park called Luna Park. By the 31st century, the actual details of Project Apollo are lost (to the extent where people believe that Ralph Kramden was the first man in space) and have been replaced by musicals about whalers on the Moon and goofy gophers, and the romantic and poetic symbolism of the moon has been forgotten. This greatly upsets Fry, who wants to see "the real Moon".

In spite of Leela's orders to the contrary, Fry hijacks a car from the Lunar Rover ride and forces it off its track, taking Leela with him. They fall into a crater, forcing Leela to use up most of their oxygen to save them. Meanwhile, Amy loses the keys to the ship and has to recover them from a video arcade claw game. Bender attempts to help her, but is caught reaching through the prize slot and ejected from the park, leaving him stranded on the Moon's surface. Running low on oxygen, Fry and Leela take refuge on a hydroponic farm. Bender arrives and proceeds to seduce one of the farmer's robot daughters, resulting in him, Fry and Leela going on the run. While trying to out-distance themselves from both the farmer's shotgun and the lunar terminator, Leela berates Fry for refusing to accept that, apart from the amusement park, the Moon is nothing but a wasteland. As night falls on the Moon, Fry and Leela find the Apollo 11 Lunar Module Eagle and take shelter inside it, while Bender goes back to flirt with the farmer's daughters. Fry apologizes to Leela for hijacking the car from the ride and explains his childhood dream of being an astronaut, and how the moon, in his time, was a symbol of beauty and romance, but he is disheartened to discover that the moon is nothing like what he imagined. Leela sympathizes with him and begins to see the beauty of the Moon herself, as together they watch an Earthrise amongst sparkling stars and the moon's rolling white hills. Eventually, Amy manages to rescue them and Bender with her newly-developed crane operation skills, just before the farmer can kill them.

== Cultural references ==
The name of Luna Park derives from various amusement parks of the same name around the world, particularly Luna Park in Coney Island. During the sequence where Amy attempts to retrieve the keys for the Planet Express Ship from the vending machine, an arcade game titled Gender-Neutral Pac-Person can be seen in the background, a reference to the Namco arcade games Pac-Man and Ms. Pac-Man. Also, The Goophy Gopher Revue is said to have been sponsored by Monsanto, a bioengineering conglomerate from the United States. Crater Face, the Luna Park mascot, is a reference to the Moon from the 1902 French silent film A Trip to the Moon. Bender shoves a beer bottle into Crater Face's eye after Crater Face attempts to confiscate his alcohol, which is another reference to the scene where the astronomers' capsule (which resembles a bottle) hits the Moon in the eye when it crashes. The title of the episode itself is a reference to the quote "The Eagle has landed" said by astronaut Neil Armstrong when he and Buzz Aldrin touched down on the Moon during the Apollo 11 mission. Fry nearly makes a reference to Neil Armstrong's "That's one small step for [a] man, one giant leap for mankind" quote when first setting foot on the Moon. At the "Destination Moon" lunar rover ride, there is a reference to Ralph and Alice Kramden from The Honeymooners. When Fry and Leela are on the surface of the Moon and it starts to get dark, it is possible to hear the first chord of the song "Breathe" from Pink Floyd's 1973 album The Dark Side of the Moon in the background.

== Broadcast and reception ==
Ken Keeler was nominated for an Annie Award for "Outstanding Individual Achievement for Writing in an Animated Television Production" in 1999 for this episode. For its original run, the episode had Nielsen ratings of 8.1/14 in homes and 6.8/19 in adults aged 18–49. While this was a decrease from the pilot episode, it did still build 5% from its lead in, The Simpsons. This was the second episode to air following The Simpsons and the final scheduled to air on Sunday evenings before the show moved to the Tuesday night lineup, where it was expected to suffer in the ratings. In 2006 IGN ranked the episode as number 19 in their list of the top 25 episodes of Futurama due to its humor and the effective way in which it portrayed Fry's discovery of the changes in the future.

== In popular culture ==
During a scene where Bender is forcibly ejected from the park, he angrily says that he will "build my own theme park, with blackjack, and hookers! In fact, forget the park!" Later in the episode when Fry and Leela close the Lunar lander behind him, leaving him outside, he repeats the phrasing when declaring he will build his own Lunar lander. The "with blackjack and hookers" has since entered into the popular lexicon as a humorous way of referring to the practice of making a competing product, service, or institution due to dissatisfaction with the original.

== See also ==
- Apollo 11 in popular culture
