= Space Pilot 3000 =

- Futurama episode
- Promotional poster for the episode
- Episode no.: Season 1 Episode 1
- Directed by: Rich Moore & Gregg Vanzo
- Written by: Matt Groening; David X. Cohen
- Production code: 1ACV01
- Original air date: March 28, 1999

Guest appearances
- Dick Clark as himself; Leonard Nimoy as himself

Episode features
- Opening caption: In Color
- Opening cartoon: "Little Buck Cheeser" from Happy Harmonies by MGM (1937)

Episode chronology
← Previous —	Next → "The Series Has Landed"
- Futurama season 1

"Space Pilot 3000" is the pilot episode and series premiere of the American animated television series Futurama. It originally aired on the Fox network in the United States on March 28, 1999. The episode focuses on the cryogenic freezing of the series protagonist, Philip J. Fry, and the events when he awakens 1,000 years in the future and is the first episode to be set in the 30th century. Series regulars are introduced and the futuristic setting, inspired by a variety of classic science fiction series from The Jetsons to Star Trek, is revealed. It also sets the stage for many of the events to follow in the series, foreshadowing plot points from the third and fourth seasons.

The episode was written by series creators and developers David X. Cohen and Matt Groening, and directed by Rich Moore and Gregg Vanzo. Dick Clark and Leonard Nimoy guest starred as themselves. The episode received generally positive reviews with reviewers noting that while the episode started slow, the series merited further viewing.

== Plot ==
On Friday, December 31, 1999, pizza delivery man Philip J. Fry delivers a pizza to "Applied Cryogenics" in New York City, only to discover that the order was actually a prank call. Despondent and frustrated, Fry sits in the deserted lab to eat the pizza while the New Year 2000 countdown occurs outside. At midnight, a party horn causes Fry to fall from his chair, and into an open cryonic tube and is frozen as it immediately activates. He is defrosted on Tuesday, December 31, 2999, in what is now New New York City. He is taken to fate assignment officer Leela, a purple-haired cyclops. To his misfortune, Fry is assigned the computer-determined permanent career of delivery boy, and flees into the city when Leela tries to implant Fry's career chip designating his job. He dodges an attack from Leela, and she falls into the cryonic tube that Fry fell into one thousand years ago. The timer sets itself to one thousand years. Fry escapes from Leela, but reduces the timer to five minutes so that she is not trapped for long.

While trying to track down his only living relative, Professor Hubert Farnsworth, Fry befriends Bender, a suicidal robot who has deserted his job of bending girders for use in constructing suicide booths. Together, they evade Leela and hide in the Head Museum, where they encounter the preserved heads of historical figures. Fry, Bender and Leela eventually find themselves underground in the ruins of Old New York, where Fry becomes depressed that everyone that he knew and loved is dead, and Leela admits she sympathizes with him as she too is alone, with no family of her own due to her parents abandoning her at birth.

A defeated Fry willingly surrenders himself to his career as a delivery boy, but Leela instead quits her job, admitting she hates it. She joins Fry and Bender as fugitives in tracking down Farnsworth, founder of an intergalactic delivery company called Planet Express. With Farnsworth's help, the three evade the police by launching the Planet Express ship at the stroke of midnight amid the New Year's fireworks. As the year 3000 begins, Farnsworth hires the three as the crew of his ship. Fry inquires at what his job is, and learns that he will be traveling into space as a delivery boy. Fry, ironically, cheers at his new job, presumably because it will be for a space delivery company.

== Continuity ==
While the plot of the episode stands on its own, it also sets up much of the continuing plot of the series by including Easter eggs for events that do not occur until much later: as Fry falls into the freezer, the scene shows a strange shadow cast on the wall behind him. It is revealed in "The Why of Fry" that the shadow belongs to Nibbler, who intentionally pushes Fry into the freezer as part of a complex plan to save Earth from the Brainspawn in the future. Executive producer David X. Cohen claims that from the very beginning the creators had plans to show a larger conspiracy behind Fry's journey to the future. In the movie Futurama: Bender's Big Score, it is revealed that the spacecraft seen destroying the city while Fry is frozen are piloted by Bender and those chasing him after he steals the Nobel Peace Prize.

At the end of the episode, Professor Farnsworth offers Fry, Leela and Bender the Planet Express delivery crew positions. The professor produces the previous crew's career chips from an envelope labeled "Contents of Space Wasp's Stomach". In a later episode, "The Sting", the crew encounters the ship of the previous crew in a space beehive. When discussing this discontinuity in the episode commentary, writer of "The Sting" Patric Verrone states "we made liars out of the pilot".

This episode shows a fictional technology that allows preserved heads to be kept alive in jars, as in the earlier The Simpsons episode, "Bart Gets Famous". In Futurama, this technology makes it possible for the characters to interact with celebrities from the then-distant past, and is used by the writers to comment on the 20th and 21st centuries in a satirical manner.

== Production ==
In the DVD commentary, Matt Groening notes that beginning any television series is difficult, but he found particular difficulty starting one that took place in the future because of the amount of setup required. As a trade-off, they included a lot of Easter eggs in the episode that would pay off in later Futurama episodes. He and David X. Cohen point these out throughout the episode. The scene where Philip J. Fry emerges from a cryonic tube and has his first view of New New York was the first 3D scene worked on by the animation team. It was considered to be a defining point for whether the technique would work or not.

Originally, the first person entering the pneumatic tube transport system declared "J.F.K. Jr. Airport" as his destination. After John F. Kennedy Jr.'s death in the crash of his private airplane, the line has since been redubbed on all subsequent broadcasts and the DVD release to "Radio City Mutant Hall" (a reference to Radio City Music Hall). The original version was heard only during the pilot broadcast and the first rerun a few months later, although the original line is still used on repeat broadcasts in the UK on Satellite channel Sky One. (The Region 2 DVD has the redubbed line). According to Groening, the inspiration for the suicide booth was the 1937 Donald Duck cartoon, Modern Inventions, in which Donald is faced with—and nearly killed several times by—various push-button gadgets in a Museum of the Future.

== Cultural references ==
In their original pitch to Fox, Groening and Cohen stated that they wanted the futuristic setting for the show to be neither "dark and drippy" like Blade Runner, nor "bland and boring" like The Jetsons. They felt that they could not make the future either a utopia or a dystopia because either option would eventually become boring. The creators gave careful consideration to the setting, and the influence of classic science fiction is evident in this episode as a series of references to—and parodies of—easily recognizable films, books and television programs. In the earliest glimpse of the future while Fry is frozen in the cryonic chamber, time is seen passing outside the window until reaching the year 3000. This scene was inspired by a similar scene in the film The Time Machine based on H.G. Wells' novel. When Fry awakens in the year 2999, he is greeted with Terry's catchphrase "Welcome to the world of tomorrow". The scene is a joke at the expense of Futurama's namesake, the Futurama ride at the 1939 World's Fair whose tag line was "The World of Tomorrow". Dick Clark made a cameo as a head in a jar, hosting Dick Clark's New Year's Rockin' Eve 3000.

In addition to the setting, part of the original concept for the show was that there would be a lot of advanced technology similar to that seen in Star Trek, but it would be constantly malfunctioning. The automatic doors at Applied Cryogenics resemble those in Star Trek: The Original Series; however, they malfunction when Fry remarks on this similarity. In another twist, the two policemen who try to arrest Fry at the head museum use weapons which are visually similar to lightsabers used in the Star Wars film series; however, they are functionally more similar to nightsticks. The interaction between the characters was not overlooked. The relationship formed between Fry and Bender in this episode has been compared to the relationship between Will Robinson and the robot in Lost in Space.

Although both Futurama and The Simpsons were created by Matt Groening, overt references to the latter are mostly avoided in Futurama. One of the few exceptions to this rule is the appearance of Blinky, a three-eyed orange fish seen on The Simpsons, as Fry is going through the tube. A running gag of the series is Bender's fondness for Olde Fortran malt liquor, named after Olde English 800 malt liquor and the programming language Fortran. The drink was first introduced in this episode and became so closely associated with the character that he was featured with a bottle in both the Rocket USA wind-up toy and the action figure released by Moore Action Collectibles.

== Broadcast and reception ==
In its initial airing, the episode had "unprecedented strong numbers" with a Nielsen rating of 11.2/17 in homes and 9.6/23 in adults 18–49. The Futurama premiere was watched by more people than either its lead-in show (The Simpsons) or the show following it (The X-Files), and it was the number one show among men aged 18–49 and teenagers for the week.

In a review by Patrick Lee in Science Fiction Weekly based on a viewing of this episode alone, Futurama was deemed not as funny as The Simpsons, particularly as "the satire is leavened with treacly sentimental bits about free will and loneliness". The episode was rated as an "A- pick" and found to "warrant further viewing" despite these concerns. Rob Owen of the Pittsburgh Post-Gazette noted that although the episode contained the same skewed humor as The Simpsons, it was not as smart and funny, and he attributed this to the large amount of exposition and character introduction required of a television series pilot, noting that the show was "off to a good start". Andrew Billen of the New Statesman found the premise of the episode to be unoriginal, but remained somewhat enthusiastic about the future of the series. While he praised the humorous details of the episode, such as the background scenes while Fry was frozen, he also criticized the show's dependence on in-jokes such as Groening's head being present in the head museum. In 2013, IGN ranked it as the 17th best Futurama episode, writing that it "deserves some recognition for successfully introducing us to a massive universe in just a scant 22 minutes, while also making it funny".
