= Lew Morton =

American television writer

Lewis "Lew" Morton is an American television writer and producer.

He attended Harvard University, where he worked on The Harvard Lampoon.

== Awards ==
2011 Primetime Emmy Award for Outstanding Animated Program (for Programming Less Than One Hour) on Futurama.

2002 Primetime Emmy Award for Outstanding Animated Program (for Programming Less Than One Hour) on Futurama.

=== Nominated ===
2001 Emmy for Outstanding Animated Program on Futurama.

1999 Emmy for Outstanding Animated Program on Futurama.

== Writing credits ==
=== NewsRadio episodes ===
- "Massage Chair"

=== Futurama episodes ===
- "A Big Piece of Garbage"
- "Fry and the Slurm Factory"
- "Brannigan, Begin Again"
- "Raging Bender"
- "Mother's Day"
- "Amazon Women in the Mood"
- "The Cyber House Rules"
- "Anthology of Interest II" (with David X. Cohen, Jason Gorbett, Scott Kirby)
- "Bender Should Not Be Allowed on TV"
- "The Late Philip J. Fry"
- "Calculon 2.0"
- "Murder on the Planet Express"

=== Family Guy episodes ===
- "Encyclopedia Griffin"
- "The Heartbreak Dog"

=== Beavis and Butt-Head episodes ===
- "The Special One"
- "Roof"
- "The Good Deed"
- "Tom Anderson's War Stories: Incheon"
- "Tom Anderson's War Stories: Heartbreak Ridge"
- "Tom Anderson's War Stories: Korean Farmhouse"
