= Bret Haaland =

American animator, storyboard artist, director, and producer (born 1964)

- Born: Bret John Haaland; August 10, 1964 (age 62); Hennepin County, Minnesota, U.S.
- Education: California Institute of the Arts
- Occupations: Animator; storyboard artist; director; producer
- Years active: 1989–present

Bret John Haaland (born August 10, 1964) is an American animator, storyboard artist, director, and producer.

== Career ==
Haaland worked on The Simpsons during the first season as a layout artist at Klasky Csupo. He has directed episodes of The Critic, Futurama and Father of the Pride. He served as supervising director for Futurama during the second season and as a director for the rest of the show.

He also directed the bonus Looney Tunes short "Whizzard of Ow" on the Looney Tunes: Back in Action DVD.

Back as a student at CalArts, Haaland worked on Jim Reardon's student animation film Bring Me the Head of Charlie Brown.

== Awards and nominations ==
Nominated Emmy Award Outstanding Special Class Animated Program All Hail King Julien: Exiled (2018)

Nominated Emmy Award Outstanding Children's Animated Program All Hail King Julien (2016)

Won Emmy Award Outstanding Children's Animated Program All Hail King Julien (2015)

Won Emmy Award Outstanding Children's Animated Program Kung Fu Panda: Legends of Awesomeness (2014)

Nominated Emmy Award Outstanding Children's Animated Program Monsters vs. Aliens (2014)

Nominated Emmy Award Outstanding Animated Program Kung Fu Panda: Legends of Awesomeness: Enter the Dragon (2013)

Won Emmy Award Outstanding Children's Animated Program Kung Fu Panda: Legends of Awesomeness (2013)

Nominated Emmy Award Outstanding Children's Animated Program The Penguins of Madagascar (2013)

Won Emmy Award Outstanding Animated Program The Penguins of Madagascar: The Return of the Revenge of Dr. Blowhole (2012)

Nominated Emmy Award Outstanding Children's Animated Program Kung Fu Panda: Legends of Awesomeness (2012)

Won Emmy Award Outstanding Children's Animated Program The Penguins of Madagascar (2012)

Won Emmy Award Outstanding Children's Animated Program The Penguins of Madagascar (2011)

Won Emmy Award Outstanding Special Class Animated Program The Penguins of Madagascar (2010)

Nominated Emmy Award Outstanding Directing in an Animated Program The Penguins of Madagascar (2010)

== Directing credits ==
=== The Critic episodes ===
- "Dial 'M' for Mother"
- "L.A. Jay"
- "A Pig Boy and His Dog"
- "Dukerella"

=== Futurama episodes ===
- "I, Roommate"
- "Mars University"
- "A Head in the Polls"
- "The Deep South"
- "That's Lobstertainment!"
- "Anthology of Interest II"
- "Teenage Mutant Leela's Hurdles"
- "The Devil's Hands Are Idle Playthings"

=== Father of the Pride episodes ===
- "Donkey"
- "Catnip and Trust"

=== All Hail King Julien episodes ===
- "He Blinded Me with Science"
