= Ron Hughart =

American animation director

Ronald P. Hughart is an American animator, director, and storyboard artist. He has worked on several shows, including The Ren & Stimpy Show, Family Dog, Futurama and American Dad!.

He also worked on Ren & Stimpy as a layout supervisor and timing director. Hughart currently works on American Dad! as co-supervising director with Brent Woods.

During his work on Futurama, supervising director Rich Moore said that Ron had directed some of the best scenes of violence on the show. This was noted on the audio commentary of "Raging Bender".

== Directing credits ==
=== Supervising Director ===
- 3-South
- American Dad! (seasons 1-4 with Anthony Lioi and seasons 4-18 with Brent Woods)

=== Director ===
==== Futurama ====
- "A Fishful of Dollars" (with Gregg Vanzo)
- "Fry and the Slurm Factory"
- "Raging Bender"
- "War Is the H-Word"
- "A Tale of Two Santas"
- "Bendin' in the Wind"
- "The 30% Iron Chef"
- "Bender Should Not Be Allowed on TV"
- "The Farnsworth Parabox"

==== The Ren & Stimpy Show ====
- "Haunted House"
- "The Cat That Laid the Golden Hairball"
- "Ren's Pecs"
- "Jimminy Lummox"
- "Jerry the Bellybutton Elf"
- "Eat My Cookies"
- "House of Next Tuesday"
- "I Love Chicken"
- "Pixie King"
- "Feud for Sale"

==== Direct-to-video films ====
- ¡Mucha Lucha!: The Return of El Maléfico
