= Chris Sauvé =

Canadian animator

Christopher Sauvé is a Canadian animator. He has done some directing, but works primarily as an animator. He has worked on several television shows (The Raccoons, The Ren & Stimpy Show, Futurama, Baby Blues, and My Life as a Teenage Robot) and films (The Iron Giant, Looney Tunes: Back in Action, Home on the Range, The Wild, and Mary Poppins Returns).

== Career ==
Chris Sauvé grew up in Ontario, Canada just outside of Mississauga. At a young age, Sauvé received a book on the art of Disney Animation, which he obsessed over and began to use as reference to learn to draw. After high school, Sauvé attended Sheridan College where he began to study animation.

Since college, Sauvé began working primarily in television animation and animated films in Canada. Over the course of 30 years, he worked several different positions in the field of animation, including character animation, key animation, animation supervision, storyboard art, timing, and directing. Sauvé has worked for many major studios in the animation industry, including Nickelodeon, Warner Bros. Animation, Disney Television Animation, and Disney Feature Animation.

== Directing credits ==
=== Futurama episodes ===
- "Fear of a Bot Planet" (co-directed with Peter Avanzino, Carlos Baeza and Ashley Lenz)
- "The Lesser of Two Evils"
- "The Problem with Popplers" (co-directed with Gregg Vanzo)

=== My Life as a Teenage Robot episodes ===
- "Hostile Makeover/Grid Iron Glory"
- "Dressed to Kill/Shell Game"
- "The Wonderful World of Wizzly/Call Hating"
- "A Robot for All Seasons"
- "Future Shock/Humiliation 101"
- "Last Action Zero/Mind Over Matter"
- "Love 'Em or Leash 'Em/Teen Team Time"
- "Pajama Party Prankapalooza/Sister Sledgehammer"
- "Dancing with My Shell/Around the World in Eighty Pieces"
- "Armagedroid/Killgore"
- "A Pain in My Sidekick/Crash Pad Crash"
- "Victim of Fashion"
- "Designing Women/Robot Riot"
- "Bradventure/Mama Drama"
- "Toying with Jenny/Teenage Mutant Ninja Troubles"
- "Weapons of Mass Distraction/There's No Place Like Home School"
- "Teen Idol/Good Old Sheldon"

== Filmography ==
=== Film ===
Year	Film	Notes
1989	The Railway Dragon	Animator
1989	The Teddy Bears' Picnic	Animator
1989	Babar: The Movie	Animator
1992	FernGully: The Last Rainforest	Animator
1993	Once Upon a Forest	Supervising animator
1993	A Cool Like That Christmas	Animator
1994	Asterix in America	Animator
1995	Pocahontas	Animator
1996	The Hunchback of Notre Dame	Animator
1999	The Iron Giant	Supervising animator
2001	Atlantis: The Lost Empire	Animator
2003	Brother Bear	Additional animator
2003	Looney Tunes Back in Action	Animator
2004	Home on the Range	Animator
2006	The Wild	Storyboard artist
2006	Everyone's Hero	Supervising animator
2013	Legends of Oz: Dorothy's Return	Head of Story
2014	The Nut Job	Animator
2015	Cobain: Montage of Heck	Animator
2017	Animal Crackers	Storyboard artist
2018	Mary Poppins Returns	Animation supervisor

=== Television ===
Year	Series	Notes
1987	The Raccoons	Animator
1987	My Pet Monster	Animation posing artist
1988	Dennis the Menace	Key Animator
1991–1993	The Ren & Stimpy Show	Animator
1993	The Pink Panther	Animation director (1 episode)
1999	Futurama	Director (3 episodes), animation timer
2000	Baby Blues	Director (1 episode)
2002–2005	My Life as a Teenage Robot	Director (11 episodes), Storyboard revisionist (1 episode), Sheet timer
2002	3-South	Animation timer
2006	American Dad!	Lip assignment
2014–2016	Gravity Falls	Timing director (6 episodes)

=== Music videos ===
Year	Title	Notes
1997	"I Miss You" by Björk	Animator

=== Video games ===
Year	Title	Notes
1994	Pitfall: The Mayan Adventure	Additional animator
