= Professor Farnsworth =

Futurama character

- Futurama character
- First appearance: "Space Pilot 3000" (1999)
- Created by: Matt Groening; David X. Cohen
- Designed by: Matt Groening
- Voiced by: Billy West; David Herman ("Reincarnation" "Action Delivery Force" segment)

In-universe information
- Full name: Hubert J. Farnsworth
- Species: Human
- Gender: Male
- Occupation: CEO/Owner of Planet Express, Lecturer at Mars University
- Family: Velma Farnsworth (mother); Ned Farnsworth (father); Floyd Farnsworth (brother); Philip J. Fry (Great-great-great-grand uncle)
- Significant other: Mom (ex-girlfriend)
- Children: Cubert Farnsworth (clone); Igner (biological son)
- Relatives: Philip J. Fry (distant uncle/grandfather by time rift paradox); Yancy Fry Jr. (deceased distant grandfather); Philo Farnsworth (ancestor, deceased)
- Born: April 9, 2841 New New York City, New New York, Earth

Professor Hubert J. Farnsworth, commonly referred to in-show as either Professor Farnsworth or simply Professor, is a fictional character in the American animated television series Futurama. The mad scientist proprietor of the Planet Express delivery service for whom the main characters work, he is the great (×30) grandnephew by maternal lineage of series protagonist Philip J. Fry. He alternates between intelligence and amoral senility due to his greatly advanced age (the exact value of which has differed across episodes). He demonstrates a mastery of any field of science necessary for the series' plots and is suggested to be one of the most brilliant inventors on Earth. However, he falls asleep constantly, and he routinely sends his crews on suicide missions.

== Character ==
A self-described mad scientist, the Professor is a senile, amoral, deranged, and unpredictable old man (160 years old as of "A Clone of My Own") with very thick glasses and a gift for creating doomsday devices and atomic supermen. He has put at least one parallel universe in peril with his inventions and visited dozens more (see "The Farnsworth Parabox").

The Professor teaches at Mars University and has worked for Momcorp on several occasions but spends most of his time inventing ridiculous devices and sending the Planet Express delivery crew on suicide missions. While at Momcorp, he fell in love with the CEO, Mom, only to leave her and Momcorp when she decided to weaponize his "Q.T. McWhiskers" toy. What he is a professor of is never explicitly stated. In the episode "Mars University," when asked what he is teaching, he responds: "The same thing I teach every semester, the mathematics of quantum neutrino fields. I made up the title so no student would dare take it"; however, this declaration has not precluded the professor from demonstrating mastery of whatever field of science is convenient for a given episode's plot, as shown in Bender's Big Score when he proclaims, "I can wire anything directly into anything! I am the Professor!" proceeding to link Hermes' disembodied head to the ship's computer. Approximately 100 years before the series' timeline, he taught a young (not yet Professor) Wernstrom, whom Farnsworth regarded as a prized student. After he returned a pop quiz to Wernstrom with a grade of A-minus (for poor penmanship), the two became bitter rivals (established in "A Big Piece of Garbage").

As Philip J. Fry's great (x30) nephew, it is likely that he is the great (x29) grandson of Yancy Fry, Fry's older brother from the 20th century. This would also make him the great (x28) grandson of Philip J. Fry II, Yancy's son, although his exact shared family members with Fry have not been stated. However, since Fry has become his own grandfather, he is also Fry's direct descendant, specifically his great (x31) grandson.

In "All the Presidents' Heads," he reveals that he is descended from Philo Farnsworth (widely credited as the original inventor of television); Dean Farnsworth, who created the Farnsworth Lantern Test to check for color vision problems in military aviators and sailors; and David Farnsworth, a colonial-era counterfeiter and British agent who was eventually hanged for his crimes.

Many episodes' major plot points are introduced by Farnsworth announcing, "Good news, everyone!"—either to unveil his latest invention or describe the company's latest delivery assignment, which is usually a suicide mission; he acknowledges this in The Beast with a Billion Backs. On the very few occasions he has actual good news, he often opens with "Bad news, everyone!" After Fry resigns from his job in "Law & Oracle", he states that he only says these phrases to make Fry "feel better about his pointless job." Another is his exclamation, "Sweet zombie Jesus!" He often says "Eh Wha?" when unaware of the situation, or when someone questions a statement he has just made. The Professor often makes mutually contradictory statements just moments apart; this happens especially often when briefing his employees, with the prevailing second statement canceling a much more reassuring first sentence.

Jochen Antoni of Albert-Ludwigs-University, writing in helden. heroes. héros, says the show positions Farnsworth as "a non-heroic character" because of the extreme disregard he shows for other people and their safety and contrasts him with the scientist-heroes seen elsewhere in science fiction. Farnsworth views them as a means to an end, as evidenced in the first episode. After remarking that he was looking for a new crew for his intergalactic space ship, he was asked "What happened to your old crew?" His response was "Oh, those poor sons of... — but that's not important! What is important is that I need a new crew!" Farnsworth's employees later discover that their predecessors died while gathering not-ordinary honey from Space Bees ("The Sting"). The Professor issues his new crew the previous crew's career chips from a manila envelope labeled "Contents Of Space Wasp's Stomach" ("Space Pilot 3000").

It was revealed in "Mobius Dick" that the first crew was ingested by a four-dimensional space whale in 2961, only returning to Earth when rescued by Leela in 3011. This appears to be the only crew the Professor showed some emotion towards, given his purchasing of a monument to honor the 50th year of their disappearance.

He frequently sends his crew on dangerous missions even when he has the foreknowledge that they will probably not make it back alive. His missions are typically those other delivery companies will not take, such as serving subpoenas to Mafia-controlled worlds or casual deliveries to virus-infested planets. Even the commercial that he had produced for his company makes several remarks to this effect, including "When other companies aren't crazy or foolhardy enough…" and "Our crew is replaceable, your package isn't."

In one episode when the crew and his ship are sent off to war, he immediately tries to hire another crew, going so far as to assign them similar character roles; he is clearly surprised to be interrupted by his old crew returning. Even his familial relationship to Fry does not dampen the glee with which he assigns dangerous delivery missions. When asked about the nature of his delivery "business", Farnsworth once clarified that he viewed his company more as "a source of cheap labor, like a family." He also frequently covets his employees' organs and blood; he keeps Amy Wong around because they share a blood type and in "Anthology of Interest II" retrieves a pair of plastic tongs and a box labelled "Leela's organs" when Leela is knocked unconscious. In "How Hermes Requisitioned His Groove Back," he tries to encourage a suicidal Hermes Conrad to kill himself in a way that would not damage his liver because "other people need it."

It is established in the episode "Mother's Day" that the Professor was once Mom's lover and employee. However, they could not maintain their relationship due to Mom's lust for power, prompting them to break up (this reportedly happened three times). When Mom takes control of all the world's robots to cause an uprising, her sons Walt, Larry, and Igner attempt to get the Professor to seduce Mom and retrieve the remote for the robots. They get back together briefly, but break up once more when Mom learns the Professor had been initially using her. It is revealed in Bender's Game that the Professor is the biological father of Mom's youngest son Igner — the one whom Mom despises the most.

Some of his more significant inventions include a hat that advanced a monkey to human-level intelligence, a race of mutant atomic supermen, a wide range of doomsday devices, and a pioneer in the development of the 'modern' robots used in the 31st century.

== Production ==
Professor Farnsworth is voiced by Billy West, using a combination of impressions of Burgess Meredith and Frank Morgan. West has stated that the voice for Farnsworth is meant to be a bit shaky and that when developing the voice he came up with "a combination of all the wizard-type characters you heard when you were a kid, Burgess Meredith and Frank Morgan in The Wizard of Oz." There is a direct nod to this in the episode "Anthology of Interest II", in which the Professor portrays the Wizard of Oz.

Many references to the pulp science fiction magazine Weird Tales indicate the Professor may be named in honor of its editor Farnsworth Wright. Another possibility is that he was named after the American inventor and television pioneer Philo Farnsworth, or after the Colonial American figure David Farnsworth, who appeared in the Futurama episode "All The Presidents' Heads" as an ancestor of the Professor and Philip J. Fry. The Professor's first name Hubert may have been chosen in honor of University of California Philosophy professor Hubert Dreyfus, of whom writer and producer Eric Kaplan was a former student.

Farnsworth's design has been compared to a combination of Mr. Burns, Grampa Simpson, and Professor Frink from Matt Groening's other series, The Simpsons.

In the initial storyboards of "Space Pilot 3000", Fry presumes that the Professor is descended from a supposed sister and a supposed brother-in-law named Eddie Farnsworth. In the first season, Farnsworth excuses his unhelpfulness by saying that he was "already in his pajamas". This was an early attempt at a catchphrase that was abandoned after "The Series Has Landed".

In the "Action Delivery Force" segment of "Reincarnation", Professor Farnsworth is voiced by David Herman.

== Legacy ==
In 2020, a new species of snake from the Western Ghats of India, Ahaetulla farnsworthi, was named after the character. One of the researchers, Achyuthan Srikanthan, was a fan of the show and character, and the species was named after Farnsworth as a reference to the character's attempts to revive barking snakes from extinction.

== See also ==
- "Professor Hubert J. Farnsworth" at the Infosphere, the Futurama Wiki.
