= Calculon 2.0 =

- Futurama episode
- Episode no.: Season 7 Episode 20
- Directed by: Stephen Sandoval
- Written by: Lewis Morton
- Production code: 7ACV20
- Original air date: July 24, 2013

Guest appearances
- Dan Castellaneta as Robot Devil; Robert Wagner as himself

Episode features
- Opening caption: The Only Show Broadcast At The Speed Of Light

Episode chronology
| ← Previous "Saturday Morning Fun Pit" | Next → "Assie Come Home" |
- Futurama season 7

"Calculon 2.0" is the twentieth episode in the seventh season of the American animated television series Futurama, and the 134th episode of the series overall. It originally aired on Comedy Central on July 24, 2013. The episode was written by Lewis Morton and directed by Stephen Sandoval. Calculon (who died in "The Thief of Baghead") is backed up and put into the body of a new robot so he can return to All My Circuits, only to learn that his over-the-top acting was never appreciated.

== Plot ==
It has been a year since Calculon killed himself in a failed attempt to win an acting competition by making a death scene more realistic. Fry and Bender are so dissatisfied with Calculon's replacement Vaxtron on All My Circuits that they resolve to resurrect Calculon. Bender exhumes Calculon's body on live television, and Farnsworth organizes an occult ritual to return Calculon's soul to his body. The Robot Devil practically gives Fry and Bender Calculon's soul as Calculon has been driving him crazy with badly performed Shakespeare-style monologues ever since his suicide a year earlier.

Successfully resurrected, Calculon returns to Hollywood to resume his role on All My Circuits, but he is rejected by the network president as "hammy" and "old-fashioned". Calculon receives another blow when he views the televised ceremony in which his star is removed from Hollywood's Walk of Fame and replaced with a second star for Robert Wagner's head. Undaunted, Calculon sees these setbacks as "an opportunity to prove anew" that he "is the greatest actor to ever trod the boards!" Starting at the bottom, he performs "HAL 9000", a one-man play that he had written years earlier; the play is unanimously panned by the critics. Stunned and crushed, he realizes that he is not the great actor he thought himself to be. Fry suggests that Calculon perform his trademark "dramatic pause" to cheer himself up, but Calculon vows never to pause again.

As Calculon prepares to begin his journey through life as a non-actor, he solemnly laments his former delusions, moving Leela to tears. She suddenly realizes that Calculon is being sincere for the first time ever. She explains that if he could channel real emotions into his acting and leave out the hamming, he could be "great". She convinces him to audition for a bit part on All My Circuits. Calculon goes to an audition in disguise and finds that he is to portray "Calculon, back from his kidnapping ordeal." The casting team, noting this auditionee's "old, past-your-prime" air, hires him on the spot.

On the set, Calculon returns to his old ways, forgetting the humility he had so recently learned. The script calls for him to whine about how pathetic he is and commit suicide by hanging himself with a rope from the ceiling. Instead, he hams it up, ruining the scene. Leela verbally beats him back into submission, and in the second take Calculon deeply moves everyone on the set, even the network president. Calculon reveals his identity and is prevailed upon to take a bow. He inadvertently pulls on the rope that is still hanging from the ceiling, and equipment begins crashing to the floor, crushing Calculon to death.

"On the basis of one performance that almost no one saw," Calculon is posthumously re-awarded a star on the Walk of Fame. Back in Robot Hell, the Robot Devil's torments are just beginning as Calculon resumes annoying him.

== Reception ==
Zack Handlen of The A.V. Club gave this episode an A−. Max Nicholson of IGN gave the episode a 7.8/10 "Good" rating, saying "This week's Futurama bid a (second) fond farewell to Calculon, with pretty consistent laughs throughout".
