= Zapp Dingbat =

- Futurama episode
- Episode no.: Season 7 Episode 5
- Directed by: Frank Marino
- Written by: Eric Rogers
- Production code: 7ACV05
- Original air date: July 11, 2012

Guest appearance
- George Takei as himself

Episode features
- Opening caption: Cancel/OK (computer buttons; OK seen selected)

Episode chronology
← Previous "The Thief of Baghead"	Next → "The Butterjunk Effect"
- Futurama season 7

"Zapp Dingbat" is the fifth episode in the seventh season of the American animated television series Futurama, and the 119th episode of the series overall. It originally aired on Comedy Central on July 11, 2012. The episode was written by Eric Rogers and directed by Frank Marino.

== Plot ==
Leela invites the Planet Express crew and the other sewer mutants to her parents Morris and Munda's 40th anniversary, where everyone learns that they met at Brown University, where Morris was a laid-back surfer (aided by having ten toes on each foot), while Munda obtained a PhD in exolinguistics, the study of alien languages; the two fell in love and Munda put aside her future studies. However, during the anniversary celebration, Munda reveals a long-standing bitterness to Morris over his disinterest in her career and disinterest in exploring the universe now that sewer mutants are allowed to leave Earth's sewers. She divorces him and moves in with Leela.

Now that Munda is free to see the alien worlds she always studied, Leela takes her to a space bar. Zapp Branigan is also there attempting to negotiate with the shark-like Carcarons. When he has problems with the translation where one of his attempts caused the Carcarons to attack him, Munda steps in and provides help with her exolinguist skills, leading the two to begin to flirt. Zapp and Munda soon begin dating regularly and having sexual relations, which both Zapp and Munda flaunt, annoying Leela, who believes Zapp is only using her mother to get to her. Meanwhile, Morris returns to surfing in the sewers around the world, joined by Fry and Bender, in an attempt to move on from his and Munda's failed marriage.

Zapp eventually proposes to marry Munda, and they quickly arrange a marriage aboard his ship, but unfortunately scheduling it at the same time as an important diplomatic function with the Carcarons. At the negotiation, Munda realizes that Zapp plans on having the Carcarons unknowingly sign a declaration of war against Earth. He instructs Munda to tell them it is a peace treaty, so that they will sign it and he can proceed to attack them. Enraged by this, Munda calls off the wedding and tells the Carcarons what Zapp is actually planning. The enraged Carcarons begin to fire wave-like beams at the ship, threatening to destroy it. The attacks end up putting the weapons on Zapp's ship offline. Morris (who had stowed aboard the Planet Express ship to try to stop the marriage) offers to help guide the ship using his surfing skills to manipulate an auxiliary control device that allows them to "surf" the Carcarons' waves. Munda realizes why she had fallen in love with Morris in the first place. She then forces Zapp to apologize to the Carcarons in their language. Once the ship is safe and a real peace treaty is made with the Carcarons, Morris and Munda reaffirm their love for each other and remarry, which Zapp officiates. When Zapp tries to flirt with Munda again, Morris punches him in the gut. Morris and Munda then space-surf their way back to Earth.

== Cultural references ==
The episode's title is a reference to Zapf Dingbats, a dingbat typeface designed by typographer Hermann Zapf in 1978 and licensed by International Typeface Corporation.

Bender is found playing poker with C-3PO.

The wedding’s Mr. Nixon and Mr. Agnew comedy routine is modeled on the nineteen-twenties’ Gallagher and Shean.

== Reception ==
Alasdair Wilkins of The A.V. Club gave the episode a B−. He stated, "The episode does at least end well, which inclines me to forgive somewhat its saggy middle section...but at least it had enough sequences [to] feel as though you’re seeing things that could only ever happen in the world of Futurama. That counts for a surprising amount sometimes."
