= Murder on the Planet Express =

- Futurama episode
- Episode no.: Season 7 Episode 24
- Directed by: Frank Marino
- Written by: Lewis Morton
- Production code: 7ACV24
- Original air date: August 21, 2013

Episode features
- Opening caption: #1 Rated Show in Universe 3

Episode chronology
← Previous "Game of Tones"	Next → "Stench and Stenchibility"
- Futurama season 7

"Murder on the Planet Express" is the twenty-fourth episode in the seventh season of the American animated television series Futurama, and the 138th episode of the series overall. It originally aired on Comedy Central on August 21, 2013. The episode was written by Lewis Morton and directed by Frank Marino. In this episode, the crew get trapped aboard the Planet Express ship with a horrific alien creature. The episode's title derives from Murder on the Orient Express and parodies Alien and The Thing.

== Plot ==
In their apartment, Fry accuses Bender of using his toothbrush to polish his buttocks. At the Planet Express offices, Hermes accuses Zoidberg of eating his lunch, and Leela accuses Amy of using her punching bag for golf ball practice, and Amy accuses Leela of using her golf club to pound dents out of the Planet Express ship. Fry, Leela and Hermes each purchase spy cameras to air out their accusations to the crew. Fry's accusation video of Bender shows that although Bender was not using his toothbrush that night, he did steal Fry's kidney whilst he slept. Leela's video accusing Amy only shows that Scruffy had used Amy's club to kill a fly and that Zoidberg had been living in Leela's punching bag. Hermes' video to spy on Zoidberg instead reveals that Bender had used his lunchbox to keep Fry's kidney on ice, which Leela unwittingly ate, much to everyone's disgust. It is then revealed that Hermes' manwich had instead been used in Professor Farnsworth's kidney transplant, causing him to become unwell.

Frustrated at the crew's uncontrollable bickering, Farnsworth hires business consultant Dan McMasters to conduct a team building exercise. On the way to the corporate team building retreat, they pick up a random hitchhiker at McMasters's behest. The hitchhiker is used by McMasters to be the first "trust fall", but McMasters is apparently eaten by the hitchhiker, who transforms into a monster, crawls into the ventilation shafts and shuts off the power. Scruffy's apprentice Jackie Jr. is soon eaten by the creature. The crew go to the panic room, but the creature shuts off the life support for the ship. Farnsworth splits the crew into three teams: Zoidberg and Hermes must restart the life support system, Leela and Amy must travel to the bridge to get the steering wheel so as to pilot the ship from the panic room, and Bender and Fry must relight the pilot light from outside the ship to get the engines restarted.

Fry and Bender manage to restart the engines, but Bender's gyroscope is damaged when the engines ignite in his face; panicked, he accidentally breaks Fry's helmet causing him to suffocate in the vacuum of space. Bender, in a bid to save his life as well as fix his gyroscope, stuffs Fry into his compartment. Fry then takes over Bender's body by wearing him like a suit, creating a combination dubbed "Frender", and gets him under control. Zoidberg and Hermes restart the life support system (which was being blocked by a skeleton they assume is Jackie Jr.'s), but Hermes' motion detector shows that the monster is coming. Hermes gets stuck in the vent and Zoidberg tries, in vain, to free him. In the ship's basement, Amy and Leela and encounter the monster. Leela attempts to fight it, but is captured. Amy's golf shot to the monster's face saves her and they make a run for the bridge and take the steering wheel. Happy with their success, they proclaim themselves "Lamy". They run back to the panic room and mistake Hermes' legs for the monster and attack him. Zoidberg, calling themselves "Hermberg", dislodges Hermes by squirting him with ink. Amy fixes Bender's gyroscope by hitting him with her club, but the group abruptly comes face to face with the monster and flee back to the panic room.

Once they get the ship up and running again, Farnsworth reveals that the whole thing was an exercise in trust. The three teams congratulate each other, but Hermes is abruptly eaten by the monster, who was disguised as Farnsworth, who also manages to claim Scruffy and Farnsworth himself via shape-shifting. The surviving crew members run out of the panic room and arm themselves with laser pistols. The monster continues to eat various members of the crew until only Fry and Bender are left; they meet up and proclaim that they trust each other (and Bender admits to using Fry's toothbrush) before McMasters enters the room. McMasters assures them that the whole thing was staged to help build trust and the monster, Blorgulax, is his business associate. He asks them to join him and the rest of the crew to a pizza party on the bridge, but Fry and Bender are convinced that he is the monster and kill him. Too late, the crew reveal themselves to be alive and well, and Bender disposes of McMasters' remains. Back on Earth, the news reports on McMasters' mysterious disappearance and possible homicide. Fry and Bender agree to not tell anyone about what happened. Linda then states that the police will give $1,000,000 for information leading to an arrest. In the event of two killers, they will give total immunity and $2,000,000 to whoever turns in the other (a variant of the prisoner's dilemma). Bender and Fry then glare at each other and at the phone on the table.

== Reception ==
Zack Handlen of The A.V. Club gave this episode a B+. Max Nicholson of IGN gave the episode an 8.8/10 "Great" rating, saying the episode "featured consistent laughs and one of the best storylines in recent memory."

Lewis Morton was nominated for a Writers Guild of America Award for Outstanding Writing in Animation at the 66th Writers Guild of America Awards for his script to this episode.
