= Futurama season 7 =

7th season of Futurama

Futurama
- Season 7
- DVD cover for Volume Seven featuring Dr. Zoidberg (left) and Volume Eight featuring Hypno-Toad
- Showrunner: David X. Cohen
- No. of episodes: 26

Release
- Original network: Comedy Central
- Original release: June 20, 2012 – September 4, 2013

Season chronology
- ← Previous; Season 6 Next → Season 8

The seventh season of Futurama consisted of 26 episodes split equally across two broadcast seasons: 7-A and 7-B. It premiered on Comedy Central on June 20, 2012. A box set containing the 13 episodes of Season 7-A was released as Futurama: Volume 7 and another box set containing the 13 episodes of Season 7-B was released as Futurama: Volume 8.

On April 22, 2013, Comedy Central announced that season 7 would be the final season of the series. The final episode aired on September 4, 2013. Despite the fact that it was originally intended as the final season, Hulu greenlit an eighth season in February 2022, which premiered on July 24, 2023.

== Cast and characters ==
=== Regular ===
- Billy West as Philip J. Fry, Professor Farnsworth, Zoidberg, Smitty, Cowardman, Richard Nixon's Head, Zapp Brannigan, Leo Wong, Singing Wind, Gus, Hydroponic farmer, Judge Ron Whitey
- Katey Sagal as Turanga Leela
- John DiMaggio as Bender, Randy, URL, Sal, Great Reveal-o, Elzar, Joey Mousepad, Igner, "Curly" Joe, Jake the Dog, Mr. Panucci, Yancy Fry, Sr.
- Tress MacNeille as Esther, Tinny Tim, Spotty Teen Robot, Hattie MacDoogal, Petunia, Linda, Monique, Turanga Munda, The Grand Midwife, Mom, Ndnd, Guenter, Mrs. Fry, Dr. Lauren Cahill
- Maurice LaMarche as Kif Kroker, Headless Clone of Agnew, Dandy Jim, Morbo, Calculon, Scoop Chang, Hedonismbot, The Borax Kid, Yuri, Donbot, The Hyperchicken, Clamps, Lrrr, Walt, H.G. Blob, Human-horn dealer
- Lauren Tom as Amy Wong, Ruth, Inez Wong, Jrrr
- Phil LaMarr as Hermes Conrad, Ben Rodríguez, Preacherbot, iZac, Chris Z. Travers, Dwight Conrad, Judge 724, Bubblegum Tate
- David Herman as Scruffy, Fatbot, Number Nine Man, Langdon Cobb, Turanga Morris, Roberto, Larry, Dr. Ben Beeler, Dr. Banjo, Mayor Poopenmeyer, "Sweet" Clyde Dixon, Tarquin, Dr. Tenderman

=== Recurring ===
- Tom Kenny as Abner Doubledeal, Dean Suspendington, Yancy Fry, Jr.
- Dawnn Lewis as LaBarbara Conrad
- Kath Soucie as Cubert Farnsworth
- Frank Welker as Nibbler, Various Animals

=== Special guest stars ===
- Wanda Sykes as Bev
- George Takei as Himself
- Jill Talley as Trainer
- Estelle Harris as Velma Farnsworth
- Patrick Stewart as Master of the Hunt
- Larry Bird as Himself
- Robert Wagner as Himself
- Dan Castellaneta as The Robot Devil
- Burt Ward as Robin
- Adam West as Batman
- Seth MacFarlane as Seymour
- Sarah Silverman as Michelle Jenkins
- Emilia Clarke as Marianne
- Tara Strong as Tanya

== Episodes ==
Comedy Central chose to air some parts of season 7 out of production order. This list is depicted in production order as this is the order used in Volume 7 and Volume 8 and intended by the producers. According to the commentaries in Volume 7, "31st Century Fox" (7ACV11) and "Viva Mars Vegas" (7ACV12) were aired out of the intended production order because Comedy Central wanted to advertise Patrick Stewart being in the broadcast season finale.

No. overall	No. in season	Title	Directed by	Written by	Original release date	Prod. code	U.S. viewers (millions)
Part 1
115	1	"The Bots and the Bees"	Stephen Sandoval	Eric Horsted	June 20, 2012	7ACV01	1.57
Bender's fight with the new soda machine, Bev (voiced by Wanda Sykes) leads to anger-fueled sexual intercourse — and a son.
116	2	"A Farewell to Arms"	Raymie Muzquiz	Josh Weinstein	June 20, 2012	7ACV02	1.65
The Planet Express crew uncovers an ancient Martian calendar (that looks like the one the Mayans created) that predicts that the world will come to an end in the year 3012. Meanwhile, Fry's good-intentioned acts of kindness to Leela end in disaster.
117	3	"Decision 3012"	Dwayne Carey-Hill	Patric M. Verrone	June 27, 2012	7ACV03	1.45
The head of Nixon runs for re-re-election against a competent politician who is accused of being an alien when his Earth birth certificate cannot be found.
118	4	"The Thief of Baghead"	Edmund Fong	Dan Vebber	July 4, 2012	7ACV04	1.07
Bender joins the paparazzi and attempts to photograph a famous actor whose face has to be hidden for the good of mankind.
119	5	"Zapp Dingbat"	Frank Marino	Eric Rogers	July 11, 2012	7ACV05	1.10
Leela is horrified when her mother divorces her father — and begins dating Zapp Brannigan.
120	6	"The Butterjunk Effect"	Crystal Chesney-Thompson	Michael Rowe	July 18, 2012	7ACV06	1.19
Leela and Amy volunteer to be players in the brutal, redneck sport of Butterfly Derby and get hooked on a performance enhancer made from butterfly hormones.
121	7	"The Six Million Dollar Mon"	Peter Avanzino	Ken Keeler	July 25, 2012	7ACV07	1.19
After firing himself from Planet Express for being useless, Hermes replaces parts of his body with robotic counterparts to increase his productivity.
122	8	"Fun on a Bun"	Stephen Sandoval	Dan Vebber	August 1, 2012	7ACV08	1.01
Fry's drunken antics at an Oktoberfest (which, in 1000 years' time, has become a sophisticated affair rather than an excuse to get drunk on German beer) land him in a civilization of Neanderthals, while everyone else believes that Fry died in a sausage-making accident.
123	9	"Free Will Hunting"	Raymie Muzquiz	David X. Cohen	August 8, 2012	7ACV09	0.99
After going to college and turning to a life of crime to pay off a debt to the Robot Mafia, Bender discovers that, because he's a robot, he has no free will and sets out on a journey of being an independent thinker.
124	10	"Near-Death Wish"	Lance Kramer	Eric Horsted	August 15, 2012	7ACV10	1.18
The Professor is deeply disturbed when Fry reunites him with his long-lost parents, whom he blames for not spending time with him.
125	11	"31st Century Fox"	Edmund Fong	Patric M. Verrone	August 29, 2012	7ACV11	1.35
Bender fights for the rights of robot foxes after finding out that robot foxes are being hunted for sport.
126	12	"Viva Mars Vegas"	Frank Marino	Josh Weinstein	August 22, 2012	7ACV12	1.07
The crew stages a casino heist to recover stolen property from the robot Mafia, while Zoidberg finds a bag of ill-gotten cash in the Dumpster and blows it all at the casino.
127	13	"Naturama"	Crystal Chesney-Thompson	Eric Rogers	August 29, 2012	7ACV13	1.36
127	13	"Naturama"	Crystal Chesney-Thompson	Michael Saikin	August 29, 2012	7ACV13	1.36
127	13	"Naturama"	Crystal Chesney-Thompson	Neil Mukhopadhyay	August 29, 2012	7ACV13	1.36
The series' characters are depicted as animals in a three-part documentary episode modeled after Mutual of Omaha's Wild Kingdom.
Part 2
128	14	"Forty Percent Leadbelly"	Stephen Sandoval	Ken Keeler	July 3, 2013	7ACV14	0.81
Bender meets his hero, Silicon Red, a folk singer who has been in jail 30 times, during a convict transport, and uses a wireless 3D printer to duplicate his guitar, but the wireless connection between Bender's brain and the 3D printer turns his folk song about an angry space railbot hunting down Bender into a reality.
129	15	"2-D Blacktop"	Raymie Muzquiz	Michael Rowe	June 19, 2013	7ACV15	1.40
Professor Farnsworth joins a gang of street racing punks, and ends up in a two-dimensional world.
130	16	"T.: The Terrestrial"	Lance Kramer	Josh Weinstein	June 26, 2013	7ACV16	1.02
In a reverse parody of E.T.: The Extraterrestrial, Fry gets left behind on Omicron Persei 8 (which has blocked off all trade and communication with Earth) after the Planet Express crew sneak onto the planet to gather a marijuana-esque herb needed for the Professor's tea.
131	17	"Fry and Leela's Big Fling"	Edmund Fong	Eric Rogers	June 19, 2013	7ACV17	1.49
Fry and Leela's romantic vacation goes south when Leela's prior boyfriend, Sean (who has been mentioned before this episode, but not seen), drops by. Amy, Bender and Zoidberg have to rescue Fry and Leela from their vacation spot (which is an intergalactic zoo).
132	18	"The Inhuman Torch"	Frank Marino	Dan Vebber	July 10, 2013	7ACV18	1.43
The Planet Express crew becomes firefighters, and Bender ends up housing a solar flare who wants to blow up the Earth from the inside.
133	19	"Saturday Morning Fun Pit"	Crystal Chesney-Thompson	Patric M. Verrone	July 17, 2013	7ACV19	1.13
Amid angry protests from anti-television groups on the White House lawn, the head of Richard Nixon and the headless body of Spiro Agnew try to watch a Saturday morning cartoon block featuring some of the series' characters in parodies of well-known Saturday morning favorites.
134	20	"Calculon 2.0"	Stephen Sandoval	Lewis Morton	July 24, 2013	7ACV20	1.23
Calculon (who died in "Thief of Baghead") is backed up and put into the body of a new robot so he can return to All My Circuits, only to learn that his over-the-top acting was never appreciated.
135	21	"Assie Come Home"	Raymie Muzquiz	Maiya Williams	July 31, 2013	7ACV21	1.19
Bender searches the universe for his missing body parts after an alien street gang has him stripped down to his bulb eyes and mouth grille.
136	22	"Leela and the Genestalk"	Lance Kramer	Eric Horsted	August 7, 2013	7ACV22	1.36
Leela undergoes squidification and is captured by Mom of Mom's Friendly Robot Company.
137	23	"Game of Tones"	Edmund Fong	Michael Rowe	August 14, 2013	7ACV23	1.07
The Planet Express crew enter Fry's dreams and find themselves back in the year 1999 in search of a mysterious alien song.
138	24	"Murder on the Planet Express"	Frank Marino	Lewis Morton	August 21, 2013	7ACV24	1.04
The crew get trapped aboard the Planet Express ship with a horrific alien creature.
139	25	"Stench and Stenchibility"	Crystal Chesney-Thompson	Eric Horsted	August 28, 2013	7ACV25	1.40
Zoidberg falls for a flower vendor, who has no sense of smell, while Bender competes against a cute little girl in a tap dancing competition.
140	26	"Meanwhile"	Peter Avanzino	Ken Keeler	September 4, 2013	7ACV26	2.21
Professor Farnsworth invents a button that can take a person 10 seconds in the past, which complicates Fry's plans to finally marry Leela.

== Home media ==
Futurama Volume 7
Set details			Special features
13 episodes (Season 7-A); 2-disc DVD set/2-disc Blu-ray Disc set; 1.78:1 aspect ratio; Languages: English (DTS-HD Master Audio 5.1) (Blu-ray only); English (Dolby Digital 5.1) (DVD only); Subtitles: English SDH; French; Spanish			Optional commentaries for all 13 episodes; Bonus Animator Commentary On "A Farewell To Arms"; "Too Good for TV: A Smorgasbord of Deleted Scenes" featurettes (1 on each disc); Alternate Ending for "Zapp Dingbat"; "Christopher Tyng's Big Score: A Jam Session with Futurama's Innovative Composer" featurette; "Möbius Trip: Infinite Futurama Screen Loops" featurette; "Futurama Karaoke: Sing Along with Your Favorite Characters" featurette
DVD release dates			Optional commentaries for all 13 episodes; Bonus Animator Commentary On "A Farewell To Arms"; "Too Good for TV: A Smorgasbord of Deleted Scenes" featurettes (1 on each disc); Alternate Ending for "Zapp Dingbat"; "Christopher Tyng's Big Score: A Jam Session with Futurama's Innovative Composer" featurette; "Möbius Trip: Infinite Futurama Screen Loops" featurette; "Futurama Karaoke: Sing Along with Your Favorite Characters" featurette
Region 1	Region 2	Region 4	Optional commentaries for all 13 episodes; Bonus Animator Commentary On "A Farewell To Arms"; "Too Good for TV: A Smorgasbord of Deleted Scenes" featurettes (1 on each disc); Alternate Ending for "Zapp Dingbat"; "Christopher Tyng's Big Score: A Jam Session with Futurama's Innovative Composer" featurette; "Möbius Trip: Infinite Futurama Screen Loops" featurette; "Futurama Karaoke: Sing Along with Your Favorite Characters" featurette
December 11, 2012	July 21, 2014	December 12, 2012	Optional commentaries for all 13 episodes; Bonus Animator Commentary On "A Farewell To Arms"; "Too Good for TV: A Smorgasbord of Deleted Scenes" featurettes (1 on each disc); Alternate Ending for "Zapp Dingbat"; "Christopher Tyng's Big Score: A Jam Session with Futurama's Innovative Composer" featurette; "Möbius Trip: Infinite Futurama Screen Loops" featurette; "Futurama Karaoke: Sing Along with Your Favorite Characters" featurette
Blu-ray Disc release dates			Optional commentaries for all 13 episodes; Bonus Animator Commentary On "A Farewell To Arms"; "Too Good for TV: A Smorgasbord of Deleted Scenes" featurettes (1 on each disc); Alternate Ending for "Zapp Dingbat"; "Christopher Tyng's Big Score: A Jam Session with Futurama's Innovative Composer" featurette; "Möbius Trip: Infinite Futurama Screen Loops" featurette; "Futurama Karaoke: Sing Along with Your Favorite Characters" featurette
Region A	Region B Europe	Region B Australia	Optional commentaries for all 13 episodes; Bonus Animator Commentary On "A Farewell To Arms"; "Too Good for TV: A Smorgasbord of Deleted Scenes" featurettes (1 on each disc); Alternate Ending for "Zapp Dingbat"; "Christopher Tyng's Big Score: A Jam Session with Futurama's Innovative Composer" featurette; "Möbius Trip: Infinite Futurama Screen Loops" featurette; "Futurama Karaoke: Sing Along with Your Favorite Characters" featurette
December 11, 2012	July 21, 2014	December 12, 2012	Optional commentaries for all 13 episodes; Bonus Animator Commentary On "A Farewell To Arms"; "Too Good for TV: A Smorgasbord of Deleted Scenes" featurettes (1 on each disc); Alternate Ending for "Zapp Dingbat"; "Christopher Tyng's Big Score: A Jam Session with Futurama's Innovative Composer" featurette; "Möbius Trip: Infinite Futurama Screen Loops" featurette; "Futurama Karaoke: Sing Along with Your Favorite Characters" featurette

Futurama Volume 8
Set details			Special features
13 episodes (Season 7-B); 2-disc DVD set/2-disc Blu-ray Disc set; 1.78:1 aspect ratio; Languages: English (DTS-HD Master Audio 5.1) (Blu-ray only); English (Dolby Digital 5.1) (DVD only); Subtitles: English SDH; French; Spanish			Optional commentaries for all 13 episodes; Bonus Animator Commentary On "Game Of Tones"; Precious Trimmings: A Compendium Of Deleted Scenes; Futurama University; Inside Futurama: The Writers' Room Of Tomorrow
DVD release dates			Optional commentaries for all 13 episodes; Bonus Animator Commentary On "Game Of Tones"; Precious Trimmings: A Compendium Of Deleted Scenes; Futurama University; Inside Futurama: The Writers' Room Of Tomorrow
Region 1	Region 2	Region 4	Optional commentaries for all 13 episodes; Bonus Animator Commentary On "Game Of Tones"; Precious Trimmings: A Compendium Of Deleted Scenes; Futurama University; Inside Futurama: The Writers' Room Of Tomorrow
December 10, 2013	December 11, 2013 UK: February 2, 2015	December 11, 2013	Optional commentaries for all 13 episodes; Bonus Animator Commentary On "Game Of Tones"; Precious Trimmings: A Compendium Of Deleted Scenes; Futurama University; Inside Futurama: The Writers' Room Of Tomorrow
Blu-ray Disc release dates			Optional commentaries for all 13 episodes; Bonus Animator Commentary On "Game Of Tones"; Precious Trimmings: A Compendium Of Deleted Scenes; Futurama University; Inside Futurama: The Writers' Room Of Tomorrow
Region A	Region B Europe	Region B Australia	Optional commentaries for all 13 episodes; Bonus Animator Commentary On "Game Of Tones"; Precious Trimmings: A Compendium Of Deleted Scenes; Futurama University; Inside Futurama: The Writers' Room Of Tomorrow
December 10, 2013	December 11, 2013 UK: February 2, 2015	December 11, 2013	Optional commentaries for all 13 episodes; Bonus Animator Commentary On "Game Of Tones"; Precious Trimmings: A Compendium Of Deleted Scenes; Futurama University; Inside Futurama: The Writers' Room Of Tomorrow
