= 2-D Blacktop =

- Futurama episode
- Episode no.: Season 7 Episode 15
- Directed by: Raymie Muzquiz
- Written by: Michael Rowe
- Production code: 7ACV15
- Original air date: June 19, 2013

Episode features
- Opening caption: Put On 2-D Glasses Now

Episode chronology
← Previous "Forty Percent Leadbelly"	Next → "T.: The Terrestrial"
- Futurama season 7

"2-D Blacktop" is the fifteenth episode in the seventh season of the American animated television series Futurama, and the 129th episode of the series overall. It originally aired on Comedy Central on June 19, 2013. The episode was written by Michael Rowe and directed by Raymie Muzquiz. Professor Farnsworth joins a gang of street racing punks, and ends up in a two-dimensional world. The title is a reference to the movie Two-Lane Blacktop.

== Plot ==
While the crew prepare to depart for a delivery, Leela argues with Farnsworth over the new modifications he has made to Bessie. He dismisses her concerns, and the ship barely clears the hangar before crashing. Sal tows Bessie away and Farnsworth breaks into the scrapyard and declares that he will convert the ship into a hot-rod using the spare parts lying around the scrapyard.

The next morning, Farnsworth flies away from the scrapyard in Bessie, now a nearly unrecognizable junk heap. Two muscle-hovercars move up on either side of him and Farnsworth challenges them to a race, which they accept. A brief race ensues, in which the police give chase. Farnsworth escapes the police by using a dimensional drift device he had installed the night before.

At headquarters, Leela unveils the new ship, a nearly featureless gray box that promises to be both safe and boring. Hermes sends Leela to shop for groceries and deliver Fry and Bender to karate class. During her return from these errands to headquarters, Farnsworth pulls alongside her in his hot-rod and tells her that she is not cool. Leela exclaims that she can still outdrive him, even in her ultra-safe ship. As they race on a looped track, Farnsworth again uses his dimensional drift device, but accidentally collides with Leela's ship. Fry is standing between the two ships as they collide, compressing him and the ships to near-flatness in a neat disc shape.

The spectators presume Fry, Leela, and Farnsworth to be dead. A two-dimensional, but otherwise healthy, Farnsworth conjectures that colliding at relativistic speed has collapsed the group into two dimensions. Bender arrives on the scene, explaining that he had been napping onboard Leela's ship.

Two creatures calling themselves the Lords of Flatbush arrive and report that a feast is being held in honor of Farnsworth and the others. At the feast, when Farnsworth attempts to explain three-dimensionality to the King of Flatbush, the King becomes angry and orders Farnsworth to be executed. Farnsworth and the others flee. Arriving at the two ships, Leela suggests that they use the dimensional drift device to attempt a return to the 3-D world. Just as Sal and the others in the 3-D world begin to cremate the remains, the remains themselves become the normal Bessie and her normal passengers. All is well, and Hermes indicates that the entire incident lasted about five minutes.

== Reception ==
Zack Handlen of The A.V. Club gave this episode a B+. Max Nicholson of IGN gave the episode a 7.3/10 "Good" rating, saying the episode had a "unique and promising idea that was long-delayed in favor of safe but pleasant fare."

== See also ==
- Flatland, a novella about the two-dimensional world of Flatland which Professor Farnsworth adventures in drag racing.
