= Assie Come Home =

- Futurama episode
- Episode no.: Season 7 Episode 21
- Directed by: Raymie Muzquiz
- Written by: Maiya Williams
- Production code: 7ACV21
- Original air date: July 31, 2013

Episode features
- Opening caption: Featuring A New Invisible Character Who Doesn't Speak

Episode chronology
← Previous "Calculon 2.0"	Next → "Leela and the Genestalk"
- Futurama season 7

"Assie Come Home" is the twenty-first episode in the seventh season of the American animated television series Futurama, and the 135th episode of the series overall. It originally aired on Comedy Central on July 31, 2013. The episode was written by Maiya Williams and directed by Raymie Muzquiz. Bender searches the universe for his missing body parts after an alien street gang has him stripped down to his bulb eyes and mouth grille.

== Plot ==
When Planet Express is hired to deliver a mystery crate to Peebles Alpha (the planet of gangs, hustlers and thugs: an allusion to director Melvin Van Peebles). Leela lets her curiosity get the best of her and opens the crate to discover that it holds weapons. She convinces Bender to disable them by bending their barrels, pretending that they are the necks of tiny humans.

When the Planet Express ship arrives at the territory of the Blips, identified by jerseys with red on the right and blue on the left, Fry and Leela leave to make the delivery while Bender stays behind to watch the ship. Eventually they spot what they take to be the Blips' rival gang, the Cruds, whose jerseys have the red on the left and blue on the right. They are mistaken though, as what they have actually encountered is the reflection of a gang of Blips in a traffic intersection mirror. After a tense encounter with both gangs, it turns out that the Cruds are sending the weapons to the Blips as a peace offering with which both gangs can fight their common enemy: giant spiders. When they attempt to test the gift, each gang exterminates itself because of Bender's efforts to disable the weapons. Fry and Leela return to the ship to discover that Bender has been "bot-jacked", leaving only his eyes, mouth and cigar in a nearby trash can.

Luckily, back at Planet Express, Hermes reveals that Bender had a Ro-Jack installed and his parts will be traceable. The Ro-Jack is traced to Yuri 's chop-shop in Filthytown, and URL and Smitty lead a raid which yields Bender's head. As he's being taken to jail, Yuri agrees to give up a list of buyers for Bender's parts and a giant robot head for URL in exchange for his freedom.

Fry, Leela and Bender proceed to scour the universe for Bender's missing parts. His antenna (or "Robo-dong") is traced to The Beast With Two Bucks Sex Shoppe, where with the aid of a photo taken by a secret toilet camera they discover it was sold to Hedonismbot. Bender's arms were purchased by the Borax Kid and are recovered on the Feldspar Queen gambling boat. His chest is found in the ERR frat house at Mars University where it's being used as a beer keg and his legs are recovered from a hospital where they had recently been transplanted to Tinny Tim. All this leaves is Bender's "shiny metal ass".

The crew traces the ass to the wreck of the Floatwell, which crashed in the Sargaseous Sea. On their approach to the location, they run aground near a lighthouse run by Tarquin. He offers his help in locating the wreck for a cut of the booty.

Bender, Fry and Leela use a bathysphere to find the wreckage of the Floatwell and locate Bender's butt. They return to the lighthouse and in celebration, Fry takes pictures of Bender biting his own shiny metal ass. The flash from his camera reflected off of the ass proves brighter than the lighthouse's mirror/lamp assembly, which Tarquin asserts is already the brightest object in the known universe. This results in the salvation of a ship which was about to run aground. Tarquin, Fry and Leela persuade Bender to leave the ass behind in the lighthouse in order to save the lives of sailors and their legacy of swearing.

This is not to the liking of the ass though. As Tarquin begins reading passages from the Bible to the spinning ass, it apparently of its own accord spins off its axis and flies off into space. It manages to save a child named Johnny who has fallen down a gravity well on his space farm and returns to a grieving Bender at Planet Express amid a flourish of fireworks in the sky which, on inspection, actually turn out to be the spectacular crashes of several ships in the murky Sargaseous Sea.

== Reception ==
The A.V. Club gave the episode a C+. Max Nicholson of IGN gave the episode a 7.5/10 "Good" rating, saying "Bender's ass took center stage in this week's Futurama, and it actually kinda worked." Cinema Blend stated that while the Lassie spoofing episode isn't terrible, it lacks the qualities that make Futurama special.
