= The Butterjunk Effect =

- Futurama episode
- Episode no.: Season 7 Episode 6
- Directed by: Crystal Chesney-Thompson
- Written by: Michael Rowe
- Production code: 7ACV06
- Original air date: July 18, 2012

Guest appearances
- Tom Kenny as Abner Doubledeal; Jill Talley as Trainer

Episode features
- Opening caption: Purveyors of Entertainment to Her Majesty the Space Queen

Episode chronology
← Previous "Zapp Dingbat"	Next → "The Six Million Dollar Mon"
- Futurama season 7

"The Butterjunk Effect" is the sixth episode in the seventh season of the American animated television series Futurama, and the 120th episode of the series overall. It originally aired on Comedy Central on July 18, 2012. The episode was written by Michael Rowe and directed by Crystal Chesney-Thompson.

== Plot ==
The Planet Express crew are assigned to return the "stolen" Moon rocks from the Apollo missions to the Moon. There, they attend a "Butterfly Derby" where women in butterfly wingsuits battle and wrestle each other in midair; competitors are eliminated upon touching the arena floor. When the announcer Abner Doubledeal asks for amateur challengers to the current reigning champions, Leela and Amy step forward. They are severely trounced by their opponents on their first attempt, but Doubledeal nonetheless adds them to the Butterfly Derby Roster as a new team, the Wingnuts. The pair are unable to improve on their first performance and lose all of their matches until they see the champions buying and using Nectar, a substance that helps them build body strength. Leela and Amy quickly jump at the opportunity and buy Nectar themselves, soon becoming as strong as the champions and developing a long winning streak in further matches. Meanwhile, Fry and Kif have found their respective girlfriends, Leela and Amy, to be brutish, unromantic and abusive while on the influence of Nectar.

Soon, their Nectar supplier runs out when the reigning champions buy out the remaining supply. The Professor realizes that Nectar is a substance created by a flower on Kif's home planet, Amphibios 9, and Kif, Fry, Bender, Leela, and Amy set off to collect more. At a butterfly preserve on Kif's home planet, they are told to beware of the male butterflies by the Grand Butterfly Curator. Fry discovers the insect first, which sprays Fry with copious amounts of liquid in self-defense. Having collected enough of the nectar, they spend the night at Kif's parents' home, each sleeping in separate bedrooms. Leela becomes uncharacteristically enamored with Fry, but both are shocked when Amy becomes just as aroused by him. On return to Earth, they realize that the liquid contains the male butterfly's mating pheromones. Amy and Leela's abuse of Nectar has made them susceptible to the butterflies' pheromones and they are forced to quit Nectar cold turkey in order to break its hold on them. During this time, Fry begins to feel weird, and at one point, creates and envelops himself in a cocoon aboard the Planet Express ship.

After overcoming their addiction, Leela and Amy have one more match in the Butterfly Derby against the reigning champs. To add to the excitement, the match is held over a pit of lava. Without the Nectar, Leela and Amy are quickly outmatched, the champions tearing their wings and forcing them to fly together to avoid falling into the lava. As the champions attempt to tear off the last of their wings, Fry awakens from the cocoon as a large butterfly and enters the arena. The champions are drawn to his pheromones, allowing Leela and Amy to leave the arena safely. The Planet Express crew fears that Fry has fully transformed into a butterfly, but his insect body falls away to leave him still human.

== Reception ==
Zack Handlen of The A.V. Club gave the episode a "B−", describing it as, "passable, but not particularly inspiring."
