= Fry and Leela's Big Fling =

- Futurama episode
- Episode no.: Season 7 Episode 17
- Directed by: Edmund Fong
- Written by: Eric Rogers
- Production code: 7ACV17
- Original air date: June 19, 2013

Episode features
- Opening caption: Watch It Or Die Trying

Episode chronology
← Previous "T.: The Terrestrial"	Next → "The Inhuman Torch"
- Futurama season 7

"Fry and Leela's Big Fling" is the seventeenth episode in the seventh season of the American animated television series Futurama, and the 131st episode of the series overall. It originally aired on Comedy Central on June 19, 2013. The episode was written by Eric Rogers and directed by Edmund Fong. Fry and Leela attempt to have a romantic time together, but with everyone around they cannot get time alone.

== Plot ==
As the crew leave Planet Express at the end of the day, Fry and Leela pretend to go their separate ways, but after everyone else has left the locker room, the two emerge from hiding places and attempt to begin a romantic evening together. However, they constantly find themselves being interrupted by the presence of Scruffy in the building, Bender unsuccessfully attempting to mug them during a walk in Central Park, Zoidberg as a busboy clearing their table in the middle of their meal at Elzar's restaurant, and Leela being self-conscious about Nibbler at her apartment. When Leela complains about the impossibility of being alone, a targeted advertisement appears on her wristlojackimator. The ad promotes Casa Isolada Eco Resort, a resort that caters to only one couple at a time and is devoid of other people. Leela is offered a discount as a repeat customer. Fry becomes jealous at this news, and Leela admits that she had visited once with her ex, Sean.

The next day, the other crew members are loading the ship with tiny cars for a delivery to Simian 7, "the Planet of the Apes" where humans are strictly forbidden. Fry and Leela enter and announce that they are taking a week off. Farnsworth initially objects until Fry reminds him that they are humans. Left shorthanded, Farnsworth instructs Amy to participate in the delivery disguised in her marmoset pajamas.

At Casa Isolada, Fry and Leela enjoy a very nice day together. When they go skinny dipping in the pool, Leela's ex-boyfriend Sean inexplicably appears, much to both Fry and Leela's shock. Sean explains that he is here on vacation, availing himself of the repeat-customer discount, only to run into bad fortune as his homeward shuttle to end his vacation is "under repair". Fry's jealousy, already at a fever pitch due to Sean's physical presence here, is further aroused when Leela accepts Sean's invitation to go to the resort's bar and catch up. Leela and Sean catch up fairly quickly, but then Sean plays his saxophone for her until a drunk and angry Fry interrupts them and picks a fight with Sean. Sean's wife, Darlene, interrupts the fight to announce that the shuttle is repaired. She and Sean depart immediately to avoid any extra resort fees.

On Simian 7 with the delivery complete, Amy and Guenter the Monkey recognize each other. Guenter promises not to give away Amy's secret, and takes her, Bender and Zoidberg on a tour of his city, leading them finally to the City Zoo. He explains that the zoo's policy of compassion leads to the animals not even knowing that they are in captivity. The point is driven home when they arrive at the human exhibit, where they find Fry and Leela enjoying their "secluded" vacation, unwittingly on public display on Simian 7. The arrival of the tour group coincides with the moment at which Fry and Leela make up and begin their vacation in earnest.

Believing that their friends are being held against their will, Guenter and the others visit the zoo director, who turns out to be Dr. Banjo the Orangutan, to plead for their release. Banjo explains that Fry and Leela actually paid to be there, as the human exhibit and Casa Isolada are one and the same. It is a popular exhibit, as different couples have visited for years. Banjo explains that when Sean and Darlene visited, the zoo decided to conduct a behavioral experiment: "strand" Sean and Darlene, entice Fry and Leela to visit, and observe. Guenter is satisfied at the news that Fry and Leela are here voluntarily, but the Planet Express crew worry about Fry and Leela being embarrassed. Banjo helps them calm down by showing them a video of Fry and Leela complaining about and mocking each one of them in turn. Banjo finally reveals his knowledge that Amy is a human, and sounds the alarm. Guenter is tranquilized while Amy, Bender, and Zoidberg flee. The crew resolve to rescue Fry and Leela in spite of being offended. On the threshold of success, they are swallowed whole by a moon worm and must wait a week to pass through its digestive tract. They emerge somewhat worse for the wear to find Fry and Leela just leaving, unaware of their presence, having spent a week on display.

Back home, Fry and Leela tell the others about their vacation, oblivious to everything that happened outside their enclosure. Bender wants to humiliate them by revealing the truth, but Amy and Zoidberg remain strong, urging him to keep the secret. When Fry and Leela loudly and mockingly revisit their own secrets about the others, Amy changes her mind and allows Bender to tell them the truth.

== Reception ==
Zack Handlen of The A.V. Club gave this episode a B+. Max Nicholson gave the episode a 7/10 "Good" rating, saying "Futurama's "Fry and Leela's Big Fling" featured a fun Planet of the Apes theme, but a not so great romantic arc."
