= Game of Tones =

- Futurama episode
- Episode no.: Season 7 Episode 23
- Directed by: Edmund Fong
- Written by: Michael Rowe
- Production code: 7ACV23
- Original air date: August 14, 2013

Guest appearances
- Seth MacFarlane as Seymour in a fantasy sequence; Sarah Silverman as Michelle; Tom Kenny as Yancy Fry Jr.

Episode features
- Opening caption: If Unable To See This Message, Turn On Futurama Now

Episode chronology
← Previous "Leela and the Genestalk"	Next → "Murder on the Planet Express"
- Futurama season 7

"Game of Tones" is the twenty third episode in the seventh season of the American animated television series Futurama, and the 137th episode of the series overall. It originally aired on Comedy Central on August 14, 2013. The episode was written by Michael Rowe and directed by Edmund Fong. The Planet Express crew enter Fry's dreams and find themselves back in the year 1999 in search of a mysterious alien song.

The title is a spoof of Game of Thrones, while the episode as a whole makes many references to Close Encounters of the Third Kind and Inception, and the plot contains many similarities to Star Trek IV: The Voyage Home. The episode’s ending is set to Manchild by Eels.

== Plot ==
Earth is slowly approached by a mysterious alien ship that repeatedly broadcasts four loud musical tones, which can be heard by everyone on the planet. At first, the music is merely an annoyance, but as the ship draws nearer, the booming tones begin to cause structural damage and threaten to tear the planet apart. No one has any idea what the ship is trying to communicate; only Fry seems to recognize the alien melody, but his memory of hearing it is so vague that he cannot place it.

Seeing that it is crucial for Fry to recover his memory of the melody, Farnsworth scans Fry's brain, finding that Fry's memory of the music originates from December 31, 1999, the night he was cryogenically frozen. While the alien ship is still two weeks away from Earth, Farnsworth connects Fry to one of his machines and sedates him, transporting Fry in a kind of dream state to the world of his memories of that day. The crew are able to view Fry's experience on a TV monitor, and even communicate with Fry with microphones. After exploring his neighborhood and retracing his steps for a very short time, he accidentally wakes up, only to find that he has been asleep for almost two weeks. The alien ship is now so close that major earthquakes occur every time the tones are played.

Although initially reluctant to return to the dream state, remembering what a bad day it had been for him including hanging out with his "crazy" family, Fry returns to the dream state at the family home, where Seymour runs up to greet Fry. As Fry muses that perhaps he does miss his family after all, he brushes off Farnsworth's protests and re-engages with his family, savoring the experience. He realizes that he needs closure, especially with his mother, but his fellow crewmembers begin to arrive in his dream, interrupting. Eventually they drag him out of the house, insisting that he continue his mission. Making a final effort to escape them, he runs back inside, but his family is gone, the interior of the house becoming just a white void as he had no memory of the house after he left for the last time before being frozen.

Bitter and defeated, Fry leads the crew through the rest of his day, even up to his last two minutes at Applied Cryogenics, still with no satisfaction. Fry takes his place in front of the cryogenic tube, leaning back in his chair as the countdown to the New Year begins. In the final seconds as he falls back into the tube, he at last hears the four notes, followed by two additional, higher-pitched notes that he had not earlier recalled. Armed with this new information, Nixon leads the crew to a landing facility built to receive the alien craft. When it arrives and blasts out the four notes, Fry uses a keyboard to respond with the final two. The ship lands, and from it emerges Digby, Nibbler's personal chauffeur.

Digby explains that on December 31, 1999, he had conducted Nibbler to Earth on his mission to ensure that Fry entered the cryo-tube. Accompanying Nibbler, Digby used a key fob, coincidentally at the very instant that Fry fell in, to remotely lock the spaceship. The fob, after all, was the source of the musical tones, the two additional notes being the acknowledgement from the ship. Mission accomplished, Digby and Nibbler became severely drunk at a local pub. Heading home, having forgotten where they had parked their ship, a drunken Digby dropped the fob, with keys attached, down a storm drain. Forced to take a cab back to their base on Vergon 6, Digby had later retrieved a spare set of keys, and has been traveling from one planet to another, broadcasting the security signal in an attempt to locate the "company car". Fry leads them to the roof of the Applied Cryogenics building, where the Nibblonian ship still rests, ransacked, with a dead battery. With Bender's help, Digby flies away. Nibbler thanks Fry, vowing to somehow repay him. Fry thinks of his mother and laments that they cannot give him what he really wants.

That night, while asleep, Fry has a dream about his mother, and once more expresses his desire to speak with her. When a television sportscaster announces the results of the 2000 Rose Bowl, Fry is confused; since that game took place after he was frozen, it should be impossible for him to know the results. Nibbler appears, and reveals that this is not actually Fry's dream; it is one of his mother's, and is the gift that Nibbler spoke of. Fry asks if it is really her, and she replies that it is, telling him that she has dreamed of him often since his disappearance. When she asks him what he would like to talk about, he wordlessly embraces her with tears in his eyes. Back in the 21st century, Fry's mother dreams of her son with a smile on her face, and admires a picture of him next to her bed.

== Reception ==
Zack Handlen of The A.V. Club gave this episode an A−. Max Nicholson of IGN gave the episode a 7.3/10 "Good" rating, saying "Futurama's "Game of Tones" included a fun trip to Fry's past, though it lacked the emotional weight of previous visits."

Michael Rowe was nominated for a Writers Guild of America Award for Outstanding Writing in Animation at the 66th Writers Guild of America Awards for his script to this episode.
