= Forty Percent Leadbelly =

- Futurama episode
- Episode no.: Season 7 Episode 14
- Directed by: Stephen Sandoval
- Written by: Ken Keeler
- Production code: 7ACV14
- Original air date: July 3, 2013

Episode features
- Opening caption: Any Resemblance To Actual Future Is Purely Coincidental
- Opening cartoon: "In a Cartoon Studio" by Van Beuren Studios (1931)

Episode chronology
← Previous "Naturama"	Next → "2-D Blacktop"
- Futurama season 7

"Forty Percent Leadbelly" is the fourteenth episode in the seventh season of the American animated television series Futurama, and the 128th episode of the series overall. It originally aired on Comedy Central on July 3, 2013. The episode was written by Ken Keeler and directed by Stephen Sandoval. In this episode, Bender meets his hero, Silicon Red, a folk singer who has been in jail 30 times, during a convict transport, and uses a wireless 3D printer to duplicate his guitar, but the wireless connection between Bender's brain and the 3D printer turns his folk song about an angry space railbot hunting down Bender into reality.

== Plot ==
The Planet Express Discount Prisoner Transfer crew are transferring Dr. Brutaloff, a supervillain with Freddy Krueger-style finger-knives encased in a Han Solo-style block of frozen carbonite, to Elevenworth Variable Security Prison. Conveying this cargo to its final destination, Bender spies Silicon Red, "the universe's greatest folk singer" at the prisoner discharge office, retrieving his belongings and preparing to depart. Bender suddenly remembers his lifelong dream of being a folk singer and abandons Fry to chase down Red. As soon as Bender leaves, Brutaloff escapes from the carbonite, beats Fry up, and freezes Fry back into the carbonite up to his neck.

Bender catches up to Red and takes a picture of his guitar, with the intention of using a 3-D printer to create a perfect duplicate to help him achieve his folk musician dreams. Dr. Beeler finds the image of the duplicated guitar in Bender's file system. He then turns a crank in Bender's compartment of mystery that causes Bender's components to wirelessly transmit the image to the printer. Bender then walks around Planet Express wearing a flannel shirt and playing his duplicated guitar.

Fry, mostly encased in carbonite after being attacked by Brutaloff, begins at this point to make periodic sarcastic comments to complain of Bender's mistreatment of him at the prison. When the crew tell Bender that he does not know enough about folk music to be successful, he explains his analysis of "every folk song in the universe" – a bad-hearted woman cheats on her good man with a rambler – and uses this as a formula for creating his own folk songs. He crashes a performance by Silicon Red and performs one of his songs while Red is distracted, billing himself as "Ramblin' Rodriguez". The audience hates it, and Red explains that Bender's song is insincere since he has not experienced a folk life himself.

When Leela echoes Red's comments, Fry sarcastically suggests Bender write a song about a heartless robot who leaves his best friend to be murdered. Bender follows Zoidberg's suggestion to go work on "the railroad" in order to have the experiences necessary to be a folk singer. In the Rusty Rail, a bar on "the wrong side of the tracks," Bender meets Big Caboose, a "steel-drivin' man workin' the Trans-Universal line". Bender sees Caboose, who is actually a robot, not a man, as exactly the kind of exciting personality that can be used in a good folk song.

As Caboose introduces Bender to his colorful acquaintances, Bender takes notes so he can use these people as characters in his song. At the work site, Bender's job is to lead the singing of the laborers and drink cocktails. After living this grueling life for a while, he begins to create his song. By the time Fry and Leela arrive at Bender's railroad camp to deliver explosives, Bender's song includes the main character, Jezebel, and the rambler whom she runs to. Fry is still angry at Bender, and when he makes a mean comment, Bender adds a verse for him telling how Bender needs help to escape the angry Caboose, but Fry, still holding a grudge, sends him away. Bender is just adding the verse where his main character begins his quest to avenge himself on the rambler when Caboose bursts in and eagerly introduces Bender to his new fiancée. She flings herself at Bender as soon as Caboose leaves the room. Bender and the fiancée have sex, which inspires him to add another verse to his song. Foreshadowing later developments, the fiancée reveals that her name is Jezebel. Bender sees this as a lucky coincidence, not realizing its significance.

While Fry and Leela are on a date at Fry's house, Caboose, who was last seen near the railroad camp far from Earth, bursts in the door with a shotgun in his hands saying that he is here to shoot Bender down for sleeping with Jezebel. At this point, Fry and Leela realize that Bender's song is also playing out in real life. Back at camp, Bender has the idea for his hero to run over the rambler with a train, rather than shooting him. When Bender has this thought, his transmitter sends a train image from Bender's file system to the 3-D printer, and the printer begins to fabricate a train. Just as Bender is saying goodbye to Jezebel, Caboose crashes through the wall in the train from the printer, yelling that he has come to run Bender down.

Caboose follows as Bender flees all the way to the apartment on Earth he shares with Fry. He bangs on the door and begs to be let in, but Fry mocks him, reminding him of the verse he had added to the song for Fry. Bender flees to Planet Express with Caboose not far behind. He finds Fry, Leela, and Professor Farnsworth trying to locate him. Bender is confused to see Fry, given that Fry had just mocked him at their apartment in his underwear, but when Leela explains that his song is coming true, Bender finally realizes that he is transmitting his thoughts to the 3-D printer, resulting in duplicates even of people, such as the duplicate Fry who mocked Bender at their apartment.

After some brief trouble with a band of gigantic octopuses, Leela realizes that Bender can "write his way out of" the problem. Fearing for Bender's safety, Leela suggests that Bender make up any old ending that saves him from Caboose. Bender refuses on the grounds of artistic integrity, as he still wishes to create "the best folk song in the universe". Just as he begins to add the next verse to his song, Caboose appears in his train and runs Bender down.

At Bender's memorial service, it is revealed that this is not really Bender, but a duplicate fabricated by the 3-D printer. The real Bender arrives and sings the rest of his song, explaining that during the octopus trouble, he made a duplicate of himself with a fatal weakness that the real Bender does not have: artistic integrity. Bender and Red decide to sell out, and they are last seen performing a rap concert.

== Reception ==
Zack Handlen of The A.V. Club gave this episode a B−. Max Nicholson of IGN gave the episode a 5/10 "Mediocre" rating, saying the episode "took Bender down an all-too-familiar path, with only mild jokes along the way."
