= Stench and Stenchibility =

- Futurama episode
- Episode no.: Season 7 Episode 25
- Directed by: Crystal Chesney-Thompson
- Written by: Eric Horsted
- Production code: 7ACV25
- Original air date: August 28, 2013

Guest appearances
- Tara Strong as Tonya; Emilia Clarke as Marianne (special appearance by)

Episode features
- Opening caption: Not the Episode with the Dead Dog
- Opening cartoon: "In a Cartoon Studio" by Van Beuren Studios (1931)

Episode chronology
← Previous "Murder on the Planet Express"	Next → "Meanwhile"
- Futurama season 7

"Stench and Stenchibility" is the twenty-fifth episode in the seventh season of the American animated television series Futurama, and the 139th episode of the series overall. It originally aired on Comedy Central on August 28, 2013. The episode was written by Eric Horsted and directed by Crystal Chesney-Thompson. In the episode, Dr. Zoidberg falls in love with a human flower merchant while Bender competes in a deadly tap-dancing contest.

== Plot ==
Dr. Zoidberg manages to make a face-to-face date with an alien woman he has been seeing online, despite the other Planet Express crew members warning him that his date will be repulsed by his disgusting stench. After buying flowers from a merchant named Marianne (Emilia Clarke), it turns out the crew was right, and Zoidberg's date is driven away by his horrible armpit odor. Depressed at his dating failure, he returns the flowers to Marianne. Suddenly, Roberto appears and tries to mug Marianne and Zoidberg, but the latter's odor chases him away. Marianne is grateful towards Zoidberg, who is surprised that she was not disgusted by his stench. Marianne reveals she has no sense of smell, and the two date, leading to a happy relationship. The Planet Express crew are surprised that Zoidberg managed to go out with a normal woman, and encourages him to use his medical knowledge to give Marianne a sense of smell, though Zoidberg is afraid she will reject him like many others have. After Marianne expresses her desire to smell flowers, Zoidberg decides to give her a nose transplant that will allow Marianne to smell, much to the latter's joy. After she awakens from the surgery, however, she finds she is repulsed by the smell of flowers (she never learned what are supposed to be good or bad smells) and attracted to Zoidberg's odor, stating she "likes [his] smell because [she] likes [him]". Zoidberg is happy with this and continues his relationship with Marianne, who becomes a garbage truck driver and "dumps" Zoidberg out of his home dumpster into the truck with her, and the two ride off.

Meanwhile, Bender, in a panic, steps on several bugs crawling all over him and accidentally tap dances as a result. Randy Munchnik sees this and invites Bender to a tap dance competition he happens to be holding at a rec center. Bender agrees to feed his ego, but finds that he is rivaled by Tonya (Tara Strong), a young girl with a heart condition. Bender attempts to sabotage Tonya, but the latter turns out to be just as malevolent as the robot, and breaks his leg. Bender recovers quickly and dances against Tonya, who wins but suffers a heart attack and dies. Insensitive, Bender tap dances on her body, but his taps restarts her heart and brings her back to life, much to his dismay. Later, Bender and Tonya decide to join forces to rob people under the guise of street performers.

== Reception ==
The A.V. Club gave this episode a B−, remarking: "It's an okay episode with a shaky start that works largely because the end is near; and it'd be nice to see the final credits roll knowing that all these characters will go out with a smile". Max Nicholson of IGN gave the episode a 7.3/10 "Good" rating, saying "Futurama's penultimate episode featured a nice ending for Zoidberg and another average subplot for Bender."
