= The Inhuman Torch =

- Futurama episode
- Episode no.: Season 7 Episode 18
- Directed by: Frank Marino
- Written by: Dan Vebber
- Production code: 7ACV18
- Original air date: July 10, 2013

Episode features
- Opening caption: As Seen At The 1939 World's Fair

Episode chronology
← Previous "Fry and Leela's Big Fling"	Next → "Saturday Morning Fun Pit"
- Futurama season 7

"The Inhuman Torch" is the eighteenth episode in the seventh season of the American animated television series Futurama, and the 132nd episode of the series overall. It originally aired on Comedy Central on July 10, 2013. The episode was written by Dan Vebber and directed by Frank Marino. In the episode, Bender becomes a firefighter, and ends up housing a solar flare who wants to blow up the Earth from the inside.

== Plot ==
At a helium mining facility on the sun, Zapp Brannigan causes a cave-in that traps 15 miners inside the sun itself. Fry, Leela, and Bender venture to save the miners. When Bender attempts to abandon Fry and Leela and return to the ship, he inadvertently saves one of the miners. Prompted by Morbo, who is covering the breaking story on location, Bender goes on to rescue all of the remaining victims. He is hailed as the hero of the day, while Fry and Leela are recognized as his minor accomplices. A fire breaks out at their award ceremony. As Mayor Poopenmeyer explains, the fire department was sold to pay for Bender's medal. Fry, Leela, and Bender put out the fire, although Bender is very showy about it and once again receives most of the credit. Mayor Poopenmeyer decrees that the Planet Express crew are now the city's fire department.

After some time as successful firefighters, the other crew members notice that Bender was present just before every one of the fires they extinguished. They ask themselves whether Bender might be setting these fires deliberately in order to inspire continued hero-worship. Their suspicions are confirmed when, while on the videophone with Bender, they see a fire break out in the shop just behind him. When he returns to headquarters, they confront him and kick him off the team.

As Bender cleans out his locker, a strange, blue flame erupts from his shoulder. He tries to extinguish it, but the flame deliberately dodges his attempts and takes on the look of a shadowy face. The flame introduces himself to Bender as a "being of pure solar energy", a member of a race that inhabits the Sun's photo-sphere. Billions of years ago, the creature was imprisoned for treason, but Bender had unwittingly transported him to Earth. When he announces his plans to ignite the Earth and rule over it, Bender realizes that this creature is the source of the fires for which he has been blamed. When Bender accidentally leads the creature to the sub-basement and the lava pit, the creature realizes that he can go to Earth's core and transform the Earth into a miniature Sun. To prevent this, Bender captures the creature, whom he begins to refer to as "Flamo", within his compartment of mystery and flees to an ice floe in the Arctic Ocean, where there is nothing flammable.

At home, Fry accepts a package that contains Bender's hero medal, badly damaged in the fire at the Vampire Bank where Bender had kept it. Fry realizes that Bender never would have set a fire that would risk harm to this prize, and flies to the Arctic to retrieve and apologize to Bender. But when Bender tells Fry about Flamo, an angered and disbelieving Fry returns to headquarters alone. Unbeknownst to Fry, Flamo escapes from Bender and attaches himself to Fry's pants. At headquarters, he leaves Fry and ignites the Planet Express building itself. The crew is unable to extinguish the fire, as Flamo eludes their hoses.

As the others flee the doomed building, Bender arrives to witness Fry hanging from the balcony and in need of rescue. Only Fry knows of his presence, and Bender quietly pulls him to safety. Fleeing with a reluctant Fry in hand, Bender falls through the weakening floor, ending up in the sub-basement near the lava pit. As Fry scolds Bender, Flamo arrives and dives into the lava pit, forcing Bender to dive into the lava to capture him. Before Fry can leave, a strange light draws him back into the room. Two large flame creatures appear, announcing that they are the "mystic aldermen of the Sun". They await Bender's return, thank him for his heroism in capturing their escapee, and depart with a bound Flamo. Finally understanding the truth, Fry promises to vouch for Bender to the rest of the crew, but Bender advises him not to, as the crew would only blame Bender for starting the fire if they knew he was there.

== Cultural and historical references ==
- The introductory tagline joke ("As Seen At The 1939 World's Fair") is a reference to the "Futurama" exhibit, part of the General Motors Pavilion at that fair. It showed the highway of the future (circa 1960), and gave the name to the series.
- The fire alarm tones are similar to the ones in the TV series Emergency!
- At the end of the episode, Bender is called "the greatest hero in Earth's history." In response, Bender says “Suck it, Gilgamesh!” Gilgamesh was a Sumerian ruler and the protagonist of the Epic of Gilgamesh.

== Reception ==
The A.V. Club gave this episode an A. Max Nicholson of IGN gave the episode a 7.3/10 "Good" rating.
