= Leela and the Genestalk =

- Futurama episode
- Episode no.: Season 7 Episode 22
- Directed by: Lance Kramer
- Written by: Eric Horsted
- Production code: 7ACV22
- Original air date: August 7, 2013

Guest appearances
- Burt Ward as himself; Adam West as himself

Episode features
- Opening caption: Spoiler Alert: Robots And Whatnot
- Opening cartoon: "Rocketeers" (1932)

Episode chronology
← Previous "Assie Come Home"	Next → "Game of Tones"
- Futurama season 7

"Leela and the Genestalk" is the twenty-second episode in the seventh season of the American animated television series Futurama, and the 136th episode of the series overall. It originally aired on Comedy Central on August 7, 2013. The episode was written by Eric Horsted and directed by Lance Kramer. Leela develops a mutation which causes her to sprout tentacles all over her body, and ends up at a genetic engineering facility owned by Mom's Friendly Robot Company. The episode parodies many well-known fairy tales including Rapunzel, Chicken Little, and especially Jack and the Beanstalk among other references.

== Plot ==
While riding a mechanical buggalo at Tex 1138's, Leela finds that she is breaking out in suction cups. Dr. Tenderman explains that due to a genetic condition, her body has begun a process called squidification, in which her limbs "will be gradually transformed into a slithering mass of tentacles." There is no cure and a very expensive surgery can only delay the symptoms for a few months. In spite of these drawbacks, the crew send Fry to sell the company ship to pay for the operation. At the market, a con artist buys the ship for two gigantic, magic beans that are supposedly a miracle cure for Leela's ailment. Back at headquarters, Farnsworth is so angry that he knocks the beans out of Fry's hands, causing them to fly out the window. The beans fall onto fertile soil, watered by a leaking pipe, and rapidly grow into a beanstalk that reaches to the clouds. Leela, not wanting to share her misery with her friends, decides to cut off contact with them and live in the sewer. As she opens the manhole leading to the sewer, she sees the new beanstalk and chooses to climb it instead.

At the top of the beanstalk, Leela finds a flying castle grounds occupied by colorful flying fish and a unicorn that eats them. She is captured by Mom's three sons and taken to Mom who explains that the castle is her genetic engineering facility, where she conducts experiments such as creating gigantic beanstalks for feeding the hungry. In spite of the arguably philanthropic nature of Mom's experiments, Leela is offended, considering the experiments to be crimes.

After the Planet Express crew realize that Leela is gone, Fry and Bender fly to Mom's facility to rescue Leela. They find Leela in the lab where Fry is horrified to see Leela's entire body has been transformed into the mass of tentacles that Dr. Tenderman had predicted. While trying to escape from the lab, Fry, Leela, and Bender encounter a giant bound to an operating table connected to medical machinery. Believing that he is suffering from Mom's genetic experiments, Leela frees the giant who chases the escapees until they flee down the drain of the giant's bathroom sink. The drain carries the three back to the bridge of the facility where Leela confronts Mom. In order to put a stop to the experiments, Leela causes the facility to fly out of control. As it nears the ground, it passes close by the Planet Express headquarters to which Fry, Leela, and Bender jump to safety.

Back at Planet Express, Leela attempts to end her and Fry's relationship, believing there's no possibility that he wants to be with her after what she's become. Fry refuses, promising her that he doesn't care how she looks, she'll always be the woman he loves. Touched, she thanks him and they share a loving kiss. Just then, Mom drops by in a cloud-based transport to thank Leela for helping her to "engineer the perfect bean", incorporating suction cups which prevent the stalks from collapsing under their own weight. Leela is still opposed to genetic engineering in principle. Mom attempts to sway her by re-introducing her to the giant, whom she has cured of hereditary gigantism and reduced back to a normal-sized man. Leela is still not impressed, but changes her mind when Mom announces that she has a way to cure Leela herself.

The episode ends with Fry and a cured Leela walking hand-in-hand through New New York City, which has been transformed into a jungle of giant beanstalks.

== Cultural references ==
- While climbing up the mass of tentacles up the tower, a parody of the Batclimb cameos from Batman occurs where Fry and Bender encounter Adam West's head jar on the body of a large bat and Burt Ward's head jar on a robot body as part of Mom's experiments.
- During the scene in the tower, Bender runs into a chained up Finn and Jake from the Cartoon Network show Adventure Time. Jake and Bender are both characters voiced by John DiMaggio.
- When Leela first meets Mom in the castle, she remarks "I am not an animal! I am a mutant being!" in reference to the infamous line from The Elephant Man.

== Reception ==
Alasdair Wilkins at The A.V. Club gave this episode a B−. Max Nicholson of IGN gave the episode a 7.7/10 "Good" rating, saying "This week's Futurama put a unique twist on the classic Jack and the Beanstalk fairytale." Sean Gandert wrote for Paste that this was a "fun, surprising episode" even though it wasn't as funny as most episodes.
