= Decision 3012 =

- Futurama episode
- Episode no.: Season 7 Episode 3
- Directed by: Dwayne Carey-Hill
- Written by: Patric M. Verrone
- Production code: 7ACV03
- Original air date: June 27, 2012

Episode features
- Opening caption: Made From 100% Recycled Pixels
- Opening cartoon: "The Family Album" (1930)

Episode chronology
← Previous "A Farewell to Arms"	Next → "The Thief of Baghead"
- Futurama season 7

"Decision 3012" is the third episode in the seventh season of the American animated television series Futurama, and the 117th episode of the series overall. It originally aired on Comedy Central on June 27, 2012. The episode was written by Patric M. Verrone and directed by Dwayne Carey-Hill. The plot is a parody of the Birther Movement.

== Plot ==
As Earth's election time nears, President Richard Nixon's Head builds his reelection campaign platform on the promise to order the construction of a "Dyson fence" around the southern part of the Solar System, which will keep out illegal extraterrestrial aliens. Leela, angered at Nixon's non-existent competition, tries to become involved by attending a debate of the other candidates. Although most of them simply cater to the crowd, she finds one, Senator Chris Travers, who appears honest and with strong ideals counter to Nixon, most of which are ridiculed by the audience. She later finds him alone at his campaign headquarters, attacking his own posters in despair. She attempts to encourage him and becomes his campaign manager.

Leela's efforts soon put Travers in the spotlight as a front-running candidate, quickly gaining momentum. Nixon discreetly employs Bender to try to find dirt about Travers' background. Bender struggles to find any blemish on Travers' history, eventually coming across that his middle name is "Zaxxar", which Nixon claims is an alien-sounding name, and demands that Travers show his "Earth certificate". Travers states that he is Earth-born, having been born in a hospital in Kenya, but refuses to show the certificate. As the populace swings back in favor of Nixon, Leela takes it upon herself to retrieve the certificate, with Fry and Bender's help.

At the hospital, they are unable to find any record and learn that Travers is waiting there for them. He reveals that he has no Earth certificate because he has not been born yet — he is a time traveler from 3028 who will be born the following day. He explains that in the future, with the fence erected, there are no aliens to do the menial work on Earth, causing Earth's economy to collapse, leading civilization to starvation and civil unrest becoming common around the globe. Nixon then eliminates the remaining working class by turning them into canned "Soylent Majority" and assigns their tasks to the robots. The robots, led by Bender, stage an uprising and turn against humanity. Travers, only 15 years old, was sent back in time (using a copy of the time travel code from Futurama: Bender's Big Score) and spent the last several years becoming the best candidate to run against Nixon to prevent this future from happening. Leela realizes that this is a compelling story and arranges for Travers' birth to be broadcast live to the world to prove definitively that he was born on Earth.

Travers soon handily defeats Nixon at the election. However, while giving his victory speech, he begins to glitch away; Bender points out that because Nixon lost the election, the robot uprising will never happen, thus preventing Travers from being given a reason to be sent back in time in the first place. A temporal paradox occurs; Travers is erased from time, and all the events of the episode are undone. Now running unopposed, Nixon proclaims an uncontested victory while Leela and the Planet Express crew forget all about Travers.

== Reception ==
Zack Handlen from The A.V. Club gave the episode a B+, focusing on the episode's social commentary. Handlen remarked, "It seems to be saying something, only it isn’t really, but you still kind of care a little. And also there are robots."
