= T.: The Terrestrial =

- Futurama episode
- Episode no.: Season 7 Episode 16
- Directed by: Lance Kramer
- Written by: Josh Weinstein
- Production code: 7ACV16
- Original air date: June 26, 2013

Episode features
- Opening caption: One of the 7^{7} Wonders of the Future World
- Opening cartoon: "Wot a Night" (1931)

Episode chronology
← Previous "2-D Blacktop"	Next → "Fry and Leela's Big Fling"
- Futurama season 7

"T.: The Terrestrial" is the sixteenth episode in the seventh season of the American animated television series Futurama, and the 130th episode of the series overall. It originally aired on Comedy Central on June 26, 2013. The episode was written by Josh Weinstein and directed by Lance Kramer. In the episode, Fry becomes marooned on a distant planet, where he befriends an inhabitant who helps protect him and find his way home.

== Plot ==
An invasion of Earth by Lrrr and his son Jrrr of Omicron Persei 8 ends with the Headless Clone of Agnew's death. A furious Richard Nixon's Head imposes an embargo on their planet in retaliation, forbidding trade and communications with other planets. Due to the embargo, the Planet Express crew is sent to Omicron Persei 8 to harvest the "sacred weed of Omicron" for Professor Farnsworth's arthritis medication. Bender's electric field activates the herb's bioluminescence. The crew are nearly caught by the Omicronians and quickly escape; however Fry is stranded on the planet after being abandoned by Bender.

Jrrr discovers and befriends Fry, concealing him in his bedroom, and feeds him his feces, which resemble candy. Due to the embargo, Fry is unable to communicate with Earth, but Jrrr helps him create a distress signal. Bender, feeling guilty for his actions, deceives Leela and the rest of the Planet Express crew into thinking Fry is still around using an answering machine recording of Fry's voice. One night, Bender notices Fry's distress signal and steals the Planet Express ship so he can travel to Omicron Persei 8 to rescue him.

Lrrr discovers an extremely ill Fry in Jrrr's room and commands his son to kill his friend. Jrrr escapes with Fry on a bicycle powered by love and takes him to a veterinarian, Drrr, where he reveals that he has been drinking Fry's blood. Drrr prescribes sacred weed to Fry but suggests euthanizing Fry. Lrrr tracks down Jrrr and Fry and repeats his order for Jrrr to kill him. Jrrr stands up to his father, winning Lrrr's approval. Fry seemingly dies from his injuries, overwhelming Jrrr and Lrrr with sadness. Bender arrives, and his electric field causes the ingested herbs to glow and inexplicably revive Fry. Drrr explains that the electromagnetic intensity of Bender and Fry's friendship caused the herbs in Fry's bowel to luminesce with love.

Fry and Bender return to Earth, where a romantic Leela unknowingly reveals just how far Bender went to cover up Fry's disappearance.

== Reception ==
Zack Handlen of The A.V. Club gave this episode a B, remarking "“T.: The Terrestrial” is the show in autopilot mode, relying on our affection for the characters and some shallow humor to get most of the work done. But every couple of minutes, there's something to remind you why coasting isn't necessarily the worst thing in the world." Max Nicholson of IGN gave the episode a 7.7/10 "Good" rating, saying "Futurama's "T.: The Terrestrial" gambled on an episode-long parody of E.T., & for the most part it paid off."

== Cultural references ==
"T.: The Terrestrial" is a parody of the 1982 Steven Spielberg film E.T. the Extra-Terrestrial.
