= The Thief of Baghead =

- Futurama episode
- Episode no.: Season 7 Episode 4
- Directed by: Edmund Fong
- Written by: Dan Vebber
- Production code: 7ACV04
- Original air date: July 4, 2012

Episode features
- Opening caption: If this show's a-rockin', don't come a-knockin'

Episode chronology
← Previous "Decision 3012"	Next → "Zapp Dingbat"
- Futurama season 7

"The Thief of Baghead" is the fourth episode in the seventh season of the American animated television series Futurama, and the 118th episode of the series overall. It originally aired on Comedy Central on July 4, 2012. The episode was written by series co-producer Dan Vebber and directed by Edmund Fong.

== Plot ==
The crew go to the aquarium where Bender becomes obsessed with snapping pictures of celebrity actor Calculon. The crew is frustrated by the finickiness of Bender's photography, especially that he uses a film camera instead of digital. After reviewing the photos, Zoidberg suggests that Bender become a paparazzi photographer for a celebrity gossip magazine. Though his career is lucrative, he becomes determined to take a photo of the most lauded and mysterious actor, Langdon Cobb. Cobb is considered the greatest actor on Earth, but wears a paper bag over his head, disguising his face in all his roles and public appearances. Bender manages to sneak past Cobb's fungus-based guard dog and takes a picture of him without his paper bag. Cobb warns him never to show his face to anyone or the consequences could be dire.

Bender develops the photo of Cobb and shows it to Fry, Amy, and Hermes, and the sight of it causes their lifeforce to violently escape their bodies, leaving them as nothing but empty, deflated husks. Professor Farnsworth deduces that Cobb must be a "quantum lichen", a race of alien lichen parasites that feed off attention and admiration. Victims who pay attention to the lichen are feeding it, but gazing at its face will cause a biological being to have their lifeforce sucked out. Quantum lichens are composed of an algae component, which serves as its id, drawing attention from its prey, and a fungal component that represents its ego, absorbing and growing from attention and lifeforce. Destroying the fungal ego will return its victims' lifeforces. However, unlike regular lichens, quantum lichen components are not physically connected to one another, so the fungal aspect may be anywhere apart from the algae component. Bender realizes that the guard dog fungus is Cobb's fungus component and that it is growing from Cobb's fame.

To weaken his ego, the crew enlists Calculon to challenge Cobb to an acting competition. They suggest he perform the death scene in Romeo and Juliet, and Calculon recognizes that the only way to ensure his full believability is to take food coloring, which is fatal to robots, and die. Though Calculon gives a moving performance and dies (unbeknownst to the audience and judges), Cobb's performance wins and his adulation causes his ego to grow immensely. Cobb explains to the crew that while his race typically travels from planet to planet, stealing entire races' lifeforces, on Earth, he discovered that he could feed off of its citizens' mindless obsession with celebrities forever. He then shows his face to the remaining crew, who are drained of their lifeforces. To stop him, Bender attempts to show him the picture of his own face, reasoning that as a biological creature, Cobb should likewise be destroyed by his own image. The attempt fails, as Cobb cannot be harmed by his own image, but it instead causes him to admire himself, causing his ego to literally inflate before exploding. With Cobb's fungal ego destroyed, he is defeated and the crew's lifeforce is returned. As they celebrate, Bender takes a group photo that shows only a close-up of his own face when developed.

== Reception ==
Max Nicholson of IGN gave the episode an 8/10 "Great" rating, ultimately stating the episode "was another quality entry to Season 7."
