= The Sting (Futurama) =

- Futurama episode
- Episode no.: Season 4 Episode 12
- Directed by: Brian Sheesley
- Written by: Patric M. Verrone
- Production code: 4ACV12
- Original air date: June 1, 2003

Episode features
- Opening caption: A By-Product Of The TV Industry
- Opening cartoon: "The Queen Was in the Parlor" from Merrie Melodies by Warner Bros. Cartoons (1932)

Episode chronology
← Previous "Where No Fan Has Gone Before"	Next → "Bend Her"
- Futurama season 4

"The Sting" is the twelfth episode in the fourth season of the American animated television series Futurama, and the 66th episode of the series overall. It originally aired on the Fox network in the United States on June 1, 2003. In the episode, the Planet Express crew is sent to collect space honey and ends up in a dangerous fight with giant bees. The idea for the story came from the writers wanting to make an episode where it looked like an important character had died. Because of this, the episode was made faster than usual and was received well by critics.

== Plot ==
Professor Farnsworth warns the crew that their next mission, to collect honey from giant space bees, was the mission which killed his previous crew. Though Bender and Fry jump at the opportunity to opt out of the mission, Leela takes offense and drags them along.

At the hive, Leela paints Bender like a bee to deceive the real bees while she and Fry collect the honey. The crew discover the remains of the previous Planet Express crew and ship, but Leela insists that they press on. After gathering the honey, Leela decides to bring home a baby queen bee. On the way out, Bender inadvertently insults the hive's queen, causing the bees to attack. The crew escape, but in the ship, the baby queen awakens and attacks Leela. Fry throws himself in front of Leela to protect her and is impaled by the bee's stinger, while Leela is only pricked by the tip. Bender disposes of the bee and Leela awakens with a minor wound, but sees Fry lying dead on the floor.

At Fry's funeral, Leela blames herself for his death. After taking some space honey to calm herself down and help her sleep, Leela experiences a series of dreams in which Fry is alive, all of them ending with Fry telling her to "wake up" and leaving her a souvenir from the dream in the waking world. Leela's insistence that Fry is alive leads the others to conclude that she is going insane.

After awakening from a dream in which she attempts to exhume Fry's corpse, Leela concludes that she is indeed insane. Wracked with guilt and loneliness, Leela resolves to consume enough space honey to fall asleep forever and be with Fry in her dreams, but a portrait of Fry implores her not to do it. Leela tries to comply, but a small space bee starts flying around the room. Leela throws the jar of space honey at it, causing it to turn into an entire swarm of smaller bees. As Leela clutches her picture of Fry, Fry begs Leela to wake up.

Leela then awakens in a hospital to see a dishevelled, crying Fry at her bedside begging her to wake up. Fry explains that she has been in a coma since the queen bee's attack; the bee's stinger pierced cleanly through him, leaving Leela to absorb all the venom. After getting a new spleen at the hospital, he stayed by Leela's side for two weeks, talking to her and waiting for her to wake up. As the two embrace, they each whisper that the other could use a shower.

== Production ==
The plot originated from the writers wanting to make an episode where it seems as though a major character has really been killed off; the story came together in a matter of hours after that. At one point in the episode, Leela is crying and takes a tissue to dry her eye. However, when she does this, she tears the tissue in half. While on the surface this is a joke on Leela being a cyclops, the audio commentary reveals that this was also an in-joke among the writers. Around the time of production, David X. Cohen became sick, but still came to work anyway. To save tissues, he ripped a tissue in half.

== Broadcast and reception ==
In its initial airing, the episode received a Nielsen rating of 2.4/5, placing it 81st among primetime shows for the week of May 26 – June 1, 2003.

The episode was nominated for an Emmy in 2003 for Outstanding Animated Program (For Programming Less Than One Hour). Writer Patric Verrone was also nominated for an Annie Award for "Writing in an Animated Television Production" and the Writers Guild of America Award for Outstanding Writing in Animation at the 56th Writers Guild of America Awards. In 2009, this episode was named by IGN as number 24 in their list of the 25 best episodes of Futurama; the episode was included in the list because of its advancement of the relationship between Fry and Leela. IGN's 2019 reassessment of the list kept the episode at number 24 (despite the debut of an additional 68 Futurama episodes in the interim), but disregarded the Fry and Leela relationship, focusing instead on the episode's balance of dark themes and surreal imagery with a unique sense of humor. The Futon Critic rated it number 48 in its list of the top 50 television episodes of 2003. This episode is one of four featured in the Monster Robot Maniac Fun Collection, indicating it is one of Matt Groening's four favorite episodes. In 2013, it was ranked number 8 "as voted on by fans" for Comedy Central's Futurama Fanarama marathon.
