= Saturday Morning Fun Pit =

- Futurama episode
- Episode no.: Season 7 Episode 19
- Directed by: Crystal Chesney-Thompson
- Written by: Patric M. Verrone
- Production code: 7ACV19
- Original air date: July 17, 2013

Guest appearances
- Larry Bird as himself; George Takei as himself

Episode features
- Opening caption: Brought To You By Regretto Permanent Clown Makeup

Episode chronology
← Previous "The Inhuman Torch"	Next → "Calculon 2.0"
- Futurama season 7

"Saturday Morning Fun Pit" is the nineteenth episode in the seventh season of the American animated television series Futurama, and the 133rd episode of the series overall. It originally aired on Comedy Central on July 17, 2013. The episode was written by Patric M. Verrone and directed by Crystal Chesney-Thompson.

== Plot ==
Amid angry protests from anti-television groups on the White House lawn, the head of Richard Nixon and the headless clone of Spiro Agnew try to watch a Saturday morning cartoon block, which features some of the series' characters in parodies of some well-known Saturday morning favorites:

- Bendee-Boo and the Mystery Crew: A Scooby-Doo parody featuring guest appearances by George Takei, the Harlem Globetrotters and Larry Bird, the third of which has only a single line via a voicemail he left.
- Purpleberry Pond: A Strawberry Shortcake-meets-The Smurfs parody used to advertise an excessively sugary cereal.
- G.I. Zapp: A violent G.I. Joe parody that Nixon attempts to censor.

== Reception ==
Dennis Perkins at The A.V. Club gave this episode a D, while Max Nicholson of IGN gave the episode a 7.7/10 "Good" rating, saying "This week's Futurama featured an overall enjoyable lampooning of Saturday morning cartoons, with no exceptional dud."

Patric M. Verrone was nominated for a Writers Guild of America Award for Outstanding Writing in Animation at the 66th Writers Guild of America Awards for his script to this episode.

== See also ==
- Lost Mysteries
- Media violence
- "The Futurama Mystery Liberry"
- "The Prince and the Product"
- "Reincarnation"
- Saturday morning cartoon
