= Michael Rowe (screenwriter) =

American screenwriter

Mike Rowe
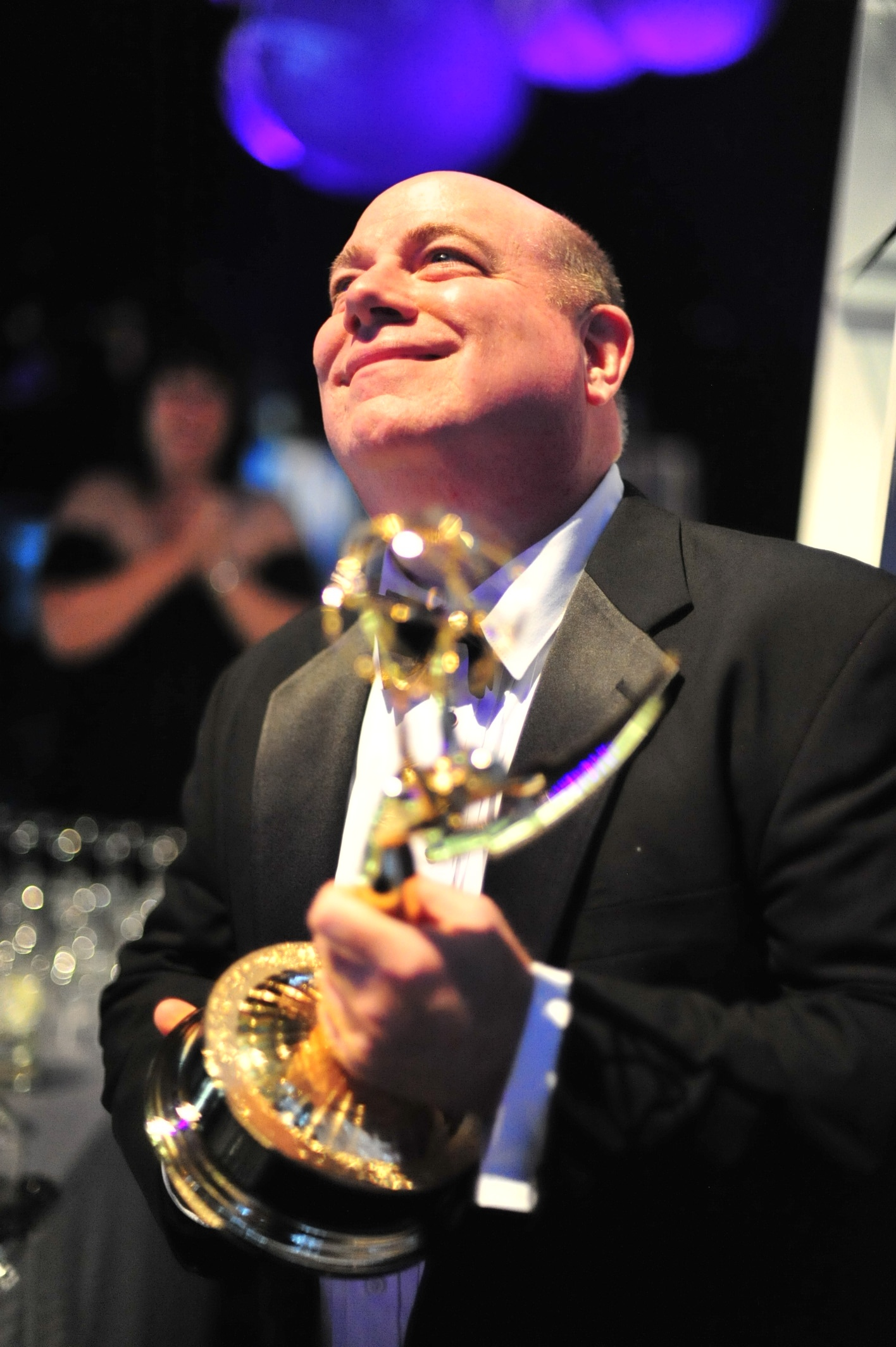
- Rowe at the 2011 Emmys
- Born: Michael Rowe; 1960 (age 65–66)
- Occupations: Television writer, producer, comedian

Michael Rowe (born 1960) is an American television writer, producer and comedian. He has written for Becker, The Nanny, Futurama, American Dad!, Paranormal Action Squad, Rick and Morty and Family Guy, as well as writing the episode of The PJs, "A Race to His Credit".

In 2011, Rowe received an Emmy Award for his work on "The Late Philip J. Fry".

== Filmography ==
As writer

Becker

- "The Grand Gesture"
- "Mr. and Mrs. Conception"
- "Nightmare on Becker Street"

Family Guy

- "Brian Swings and Sings"

Futurama

- "Bend Her"
- "Bender's Game" Part 3 with Eric Kaplan
- "Proposition Infinity"
- "The Futurama Holiday Spectacular"
- "Fry am the Egg Man"
- "The Butterjunk Effect"
- "2-D Blacktop"
- "Game of Tones"

Voice actor

Dr. Katz, Professional Therapist

- S04E08 "Closets"
