= Futurama =

American animated sci-fi sitcom

- Genre: Animated sitcom; Science fiction comedy; Satire; Black comedy
- Created by: Matt Groening
- Developed by: Matt Groening; David X. Cohen
- Showrunner: David X. Cohen
- Voices of: Billy West; Katey Sagal; John DiMaggio; Tress MacNeille; Maurice LaMarche; Phil LaMarr; Lauren Tom; David Herman
- Opening theme: "Theme from Futurama"
- Composer: Christopher Tyng
- Country of origin: United States
- Original language: English
- No. of seasons: 11
- No. of episodes: 180 (list of episodes)

Production
- Executive producers: Matt Groening; David X. Cohen; Ken Keeler; Claudia Katz
- Producers: Lew Morton; J. Stewart Burns; Patric M. Verrone; Bill Odenkirk; Eric Kaplan; Michael Rowe; Brian J. Cowan; Jason Grode; Jane O'Brien; Lee Supercinski
- Editors: Paul D. Calder; Danik Thomas; Chris Vallance
- Running time: 22 minutes
- Production companies: The Curiosity Company; 20th Century Fox Television (seasons 1–7) (Note: Credited as "30th Century Fox Television"); 20th Television Animation (season 8–present) (Note: Credited as "30th Television Animation")

Original release
- Network: Fox
- Release: March 28, 1999 – August 10, 2003
- Network: Comedy Central
- Release: March 23, 2008 – September 4, 2013
- Network: Hulu
- Release: July 24, 2023 – present

Related
- The Simpsons; Disenchantment

Futurama is an American animated science fiction sitcom created by Matt Groening and developed by Groening and David X. Cohen for the Fox Broadcasting Company, and later revived by Comedy Central and then Hulu. The series follows Philip J. Fry, a young man who is cryogenically preserved for 1,000 years and revived on December 31, 2999. Fry finds work at the interplanetary delivery company Planet Express, working alongside the one-eyed mutant Leela and the robot Bender. The series was envisioned by Groening in the mid-1990s while working on The Simpsons; he brought Cohen, a Simpsons writer, aboard to develop storylines and characters to pitch the show to Fox.

Following its initial cancellation by Fox, Futurama began airing reruns on Cartoon Network's Adult Swim programming block, which lasted from 2003 to 2007. It was revived in 2007 as four direct-to-video films, the last of which was released in early 2009. Comedy Central entered into an agreement with 20th Century Fox Television to syndicate the existing episodes and air the films as 16 new, half-hour episodes, constituting a fifth production season, or the sixth to be broadcast (2008–2009).

In June 2009, Comedy Central picked up the series for 26 new half-hour episodes, which aired in 2010 and 2011, constituting the sixth production season, or the seventh (2010) and eighth (2011) to be broadcast. The show was renewed for a seventh production season, airing as the ninth (2012) and tenth (2013) broadcast seasons. On February 9, 2022, Hulu revived the series with a twenty-episode order, which was released as two separate production and broadcast seasons. In November 2023, the series was renewed by Hulu for a further twenty episodes, taking the series through to an eleventh production (fourteenth broadcast) season. Futurama resumed airing new episodes on August 3, 2026. A twelfth production season containing three extended-length specials is in production, which are expected to premiere in 2027.

Futurama has received critical acclaim throughout its run and was nominated for 17 Annie Awards, winning nine of them, and 12 Emmy Awards, winning six. It was nominated four times for a Writers Guild of America Award, winning for the episodes "Godfellas" and "The Prisoner of Benda". It was nominated for a Nebula Award and received Environmental Media Awards for the episodes "The Problem with Popplers" and "The Futurama Holiday Spectacular". Merchandise includes a tie-in comic book series, video games, calendars, clothes, and action figures. In 2013, TV Guide ranked Futurama on its list of the "60 Greatest TV Cartoons of All Time".

== Premise ==
=== Characters ===
Logo of Planet Express

Futurama is essentially a workplace sitcom, the plot of which revolves around the Planet Express interplanetary delivery company and its employees, a small group that largely fails to conform to future society. Episodes usually feature the central trio of Fry, Leela, and Bender, though occasional storylines center on the other main characters.

- Philip J. Fry (voiced by Billy West) is a slovenly, gullible, yet good-hearted and sensitive pizza delivery boy who falls into a cryogenic pod, causing it to activate and freeze him just after midnight on January 1, 2000. He reawakens on New Year's Eve of 2999 and gets a job as a cargo delivery boy at Planet Express, a company owned by his only living relative, Professor Hubert J. Farnsworth. Fry's love for Leela is a recurring theme throughout the series.
- Turanga Leela (voiced by Katey Sagal) is the competent, one-eyed captain of the Planet Express Ship. Abandoned as a baby, she grows up in the Cookieville Minimum Security Orphanarium believing herself to be an alien from another planet, but learns that she is actually a mutant from the sewers in the episode "Leela's Homeworld". Prior to becoming the ship's captain, Leela works as a career assignment officer at the cryogenics lab where she first meets Fry. She is Fry's primary love interest and eventually becomes his wife. Her name is a reference to the Turangalîla-Symphonie by Olivier Messiaen.
- Bender Bending Rodriguez (voiced by John DiMaggio) is a foul-mouthed, heavy-drinking, cigar-smoking, kleptomaniacal, misanthropic, egocentric, ill-tempered robot manufactured by Mom's Friendly Robot Company. He is originally programmed to bend girders, and is later designated as assistant sales manager and cook at Planet Express, despite lacking a sense of taste. He is Fry's best friend and roommate. He must drink heavily to power his fuel cells and becomes the robot equivalent of drunk when low on alcohol.
- Professor Hubert J. Farnsworth (voiced by Billy West), also known simply as "the Professor", is Fry's distant nephew, and technically descendant. Farnsworth founds Planet Express Inc. to fund his work as a mad scientist. Although he is depicted as a brilliant scientist and inventor, at more than 160 years old (between 10–20 years off from death, according to "The Numberland Gap") he is extremely prone to age-related forgetfulness and fits of temper. In the episode "A Clone of My Own", the Professor clones himself to produce a successor, Cubert Farnsworth (voiced by Kath Soucie), whom he treats like a son.
- Hermes Conrad (voiced by Phil LaMarr) is the Jamaican accountant of Planet Express. A 36th-level bureaucrat (demoted to level 37 during the series) and proud of it, he is a stickler for regulation and enamored of the tedium of paperwork and bureaucracy. Hermes is also a former champion in Olympic Limbo, a sport derived from the popular party activity. He gave up limbo after the 2980 Olympics when a young fan, imitating him, broke his back and died. Hermes has a wife, LaBarbara, and a 12-year-old son, Dwight.
- Dr. John A. Zoidberg (voiced by Billy West) is a Decapodian, a squid/lobster-hybrid alien from his home planet Decapod 10, and the neurotic staff physician of Planet Express. Although he claims to be an expert on humans, his knowledge of human anatomy and physiology is woefully inaccurate (at one point, he states that his doctorate is actually in art history). Zoidberg's expertise seems to be with extra-terrestrial creatures. Homeless and penniless, he lives in the dumpster behind Planet Express. Although Zoidberg is depicted as being Professor Farnsworth's long-time friend, he is held in contempt by everyone on the crew.
- Amy Wong (voiced by Lauren Tom) is an incredibly rich, blunt, ditzy, and accident-prone yet sweet-hearted long-term intern at Planet Express. She is an astrophysics student at Mars University and heiress to the western hemisphere of Mars. In the second episode of season one, the Professor states that he likes having Amy around because she has the same bloodtype as him. Born on Mars, she is ethnically Chinese and is prone to cursing in Cantonese and using 31st-century slang. Her parents are the wealthy ranchers Leo and Inez Wong. She is promiscuous in the beginning of the series, but eventually enters a monogamous relationship with Kif Kroker. In the show's sixth season, she acquires her doctorate, and in the eighth season, she and Kif become parents.

=== Setting ===
The flag of the Government of Earth

Variant of the flag of Earth in Futurama

Futurama is set in New New York at the turn of the 31st century, in a time filled with technological wonders. The city of New New York has been built over the ruins of present-day New York City, which has become a catacomb-like space that acts as New New York's sewer, referred to as "Old New York". Parts of the sewers are inhabited by mutants. Various devices and architecture are similar to the Populuxe style. Global warming, capitalism, inflexible bureaucracy, and substance abuse are a few of the subjects given a 31st-century exaggeration in a world where the problems have become both more extreme and more common. Just as New York has become a more extreme version of itself in the future, other Earth locations are given the same treatment; Los Angeles, for example, is depicted as a smog-filled apocalyptic wasteland.

Numerous technological advances have been made between the present day and the 31st century. The Head Museum, which keeps a collection of heads alive in jars thanks to technology invented by Ron Popeil (who has a guest cameo in "A Big Piece of Garbage"), has resulted in many historical figures and current celebrities being present, including Groening himself; this became the writers' device to feature and poke fun at contemporary celebrities in the show. Several of the preserved heads shown are those of people who were already dead well before the advent of this technology; one of the most prominent examples of this anomaly is former U.S. president Richard Nixon, who died in 1994 and appears in numerous episodes. The Internet, while being fully immersive and encompassing all senses—even featuring its own digital world (similar to Tron or The Matrix)—is slow and largely consists of pornography, pop-up ads, and "filthy" (or Filthy Filthy) chat rooms. Some of it is edited to include educational material ostensibly for youth. Television is still a primary form of entertainment. Self-aware robots are a common sight, and are the main cause of global warming due to the exhaust from their alcohol-powered systems. The wheel is obsolete (no one but Fry even seems to recognize the design), having been forgotten and replaced by hover cars and a network of large, clear pneumatic transportation tubes.

Environmentally, common animals still remain, alongside mutated, cross-bred (sometimes with humans) and extraterrestrial animals. Ironically, spotted owls are often shown to have replaced rats as common household pests. Although rats still exist, sometimes rats act like pigeons, though pigeons still exist, as well. Anchovies have been extinct for 800 years because of the Decapodians. Earth still suffers the effects of greenhouse gases, although in one episode Leela states that its effects have been counteracted by nuclear winter. In another episode, the effects of global warming have been somewhat mitigated by the dropping of a giant ice cube into the ocean, and later by pushing Earth farther away from the Sun, which also extended the year by one week.

Religion is a prominent part of society, although the dominant religions have evolved. A merging of the major religious groups of the 20th century has resulted in the First Amalgamated Church, while Voodoo is now mainstream. New religions include Oprahism, Robotology, and the banned religion of Star Trek fandom. Religious figures include Father Changstein-El-Gamal, the Robot Devil, Reverend Lionel Preacherbot, and passing references to the Space Pope, who appears to be a large crocodile-like creature. Several major holidays have robots associated with them, including the murderous Robot Santa, Kwanzaa-bot and (in a couple of appearances) Hanukah Zombie. While very few episodes focus exclusively on religion within the Futurama universe, they do cover a wide variety of subjects including predestination, prayer, the nature of salvation, and religious conversion.

Futurama's setting is a backdrop, and the writers are not above committing continuity errors if they serve to further the gags. For example, while the pilot episode implies that the previous Planet Express crew was killed by a space wasp, the later episode "The Sting" is based on the crew having been killed by space bees instead. The "world of tomorrow" setting is used to highlight and lampoon issues of today and to parody the science-fiction genre.

== Episodes ==
This list follows the season box sets, which feature the episodes in the original production season order, ignoring the order of broadcast. The Hulu revival has alternatively been titled the eighth and ninth seasons (production), and the eleventh and twelfth seasons (broadcast). The tenth and eleventh production seasons will also be considered as Futurama's thirteenth and fourteenth broadcast seasons.

Produced season	Broadcast season	Episodes		Originally released		
Produced season	Broadcast season	Episodes		First released	Last released	Network
1	1–2	13		March 28, 1999	November 14, 1999	Fox
2	2–3	19		November 21, 1999	December 3, 2000	Fox
3	3–4	22		January 21, 2001	December 8, 2002	Fox
4	4–5	18		February 10, 2002	August 10, 2003	Fox
5	6	16		March 23, 2008	August 30, 2009	Comedy; Central
6	7	26	13	June 24, 2010	November 21, 2010	Comedy; Central
6	8	26	13	June 23, 2011	September 8, 2011	Comedy; Central
7	9	26	13	June 20, 2012	August 29, 2012	Comedy; Central
7	10	26	13	June 19, 2013	September 4, 2013	Comedy; Central
8	11	10		July 24, 2023	September 25, 2023	Hulu
9	12	10		July 29, 2024	September 30, 2024	Hulu
10	13	10		September 15, 2025		Hulu
11	14	10		August 3, 2026	September 28, 2026	Hulu

== Production ==
=== Development ===
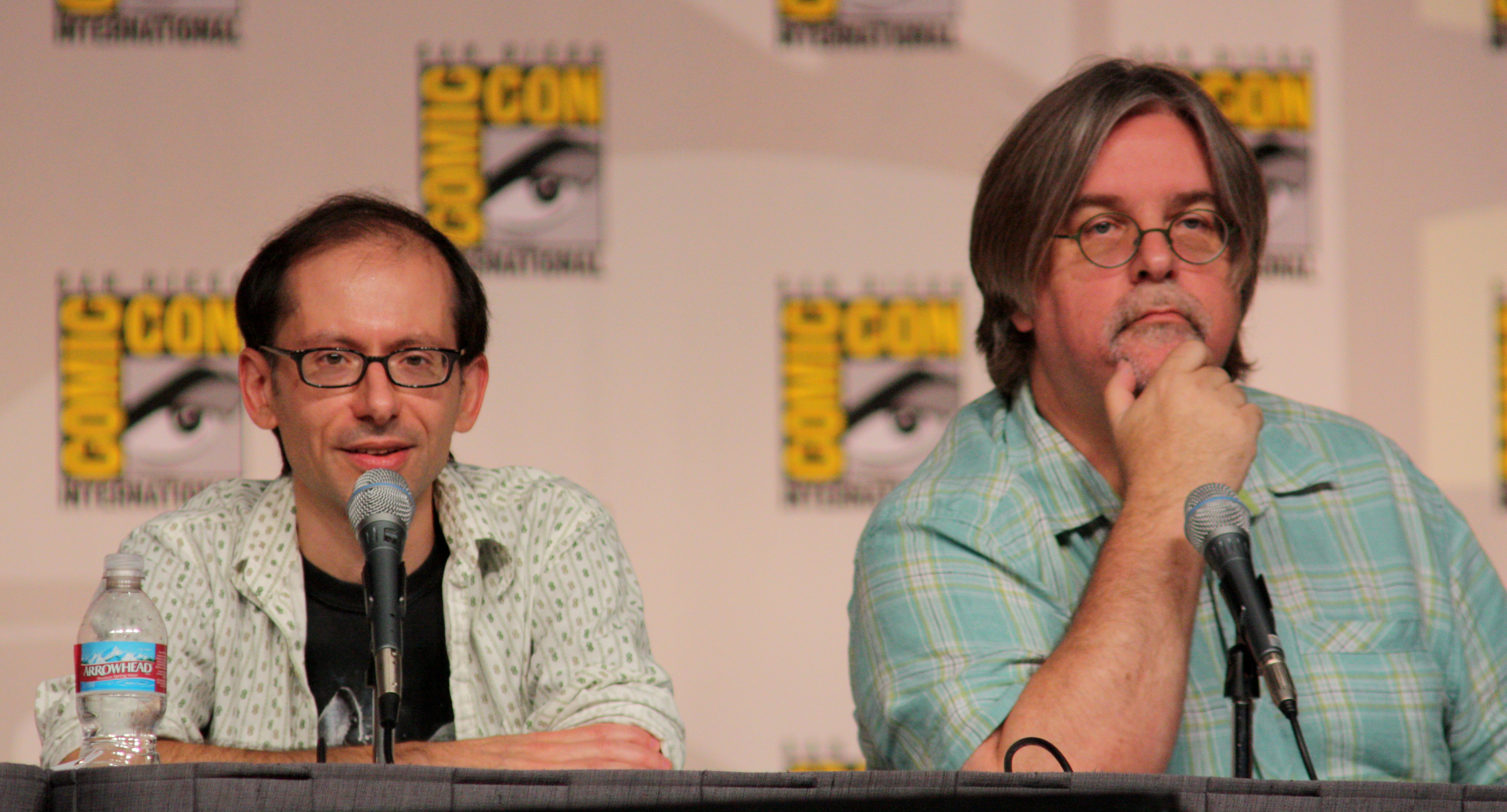
David X. Cohen and Matt Groening at the Futurama panel of Comic-Con 2009

The television network Fox expressed a strong desire in the mid-1990s for Matt Groening to create a new series after the success of his previous series, The Simpsons; Groening began conceiving Futurama during this period. In 1996, he enlisted David X. Cohen, then a writer and producer for The Simpsons, to assist in developing the show. The two spent time researching science fiction books, television shows, and films. When they pitched the series to Fox in April 1998, Groening and Cohen had composed many characters and story lines; Groening claimed they had gone "overboard" in their discussions. Groening described trying to get the show on the air as "by far the worst experience of my grown-up life".

Fox ordered thirteen episodes. Immediately after, however, Fox feared the themes of the show were not suitable for the network and Groening and Fox executives argued over whether the network would have any creative input into the show. With The Simpsons, the network has no input. Fox was particularly disturbed by the concept of suicide booths, Doctor Zoidberg, and Bender's anti-social behavior. Groening explains, "When they tried to give me notes on Futurama, I just said: 'No, we're going to do this just the way we did Simpsons.' And they said, 'Well, we don't do business that way anymore.' And I said, 'Oh, well, that's the only way I do business.'" The episode "I, Roommate" was produced to address Fox's concerns, with the script written to their specifications. Fox strongly disliked the episode, but after negotiations, Groening received the same independence with Futurama.

The name Futurama comes from a pavilion at the 1939 New York World's Fair (as later mentioned as an opening caption of the episode "The Inhuman Torch"). Designed by Norman Bel Geddes, the Futurama pavilion depicted how he imagined the world would look in 1959. Many other titles were considered for the series, including Aloha, Mars! and Doomsville, which Groening notes were "resoundly rejected, by everyone concerned with it". It takes approximately six to nine months to produce an episode of Futurama. The long production time results in several episodes being worked on simultaneously.

=== Writing ===
The planning for each episode began with a table meeting of writers, who discussed the plot ideas as a group. The writers are given index cards with plot points that they are required to use as the center of activity in each episode. A single staff writer wrote an outline and then produced a script. Once the first draft of a script was finished, the writers and executive producers called in the actors for a table read. After this script reading, the writers collaborated to rewrite the script as a group before sending it to the animation team. At this point the voice recording was also started and the script was out of the writers' hands.

The Futurama writing staff held three Ph.D.s, seven master's degrees, and cumulatively had more than 50 years at Harvard University. Series writer Patric M. Verrone stated, "we were easily the most overeducated cartoon writers in history".

=== Voice actors ===
Futurama has eight main cast members. Billy West performed the voices of Philip J. Fry, Professor Farnsworth, Doctor Zoidberg, Zapp Brannigan, and many other incidental characters. West auditioned for "just about every part", landing the roles of the Professor and Doctor Zoidberg. Although West read for Fry, his friend Charlie Schlatter was initially given the role. Due to a casting change, West was called back to audition again and was given the role. West claims that the voice of Fry is deliberately modeled on his own, so as to make it difficult for another person to replicate the voice. Doctor Zoidberg's voice was based on Lou Jacobi and George Jessel. The character of Zapp Brannigan was originally created for and intended to be performed by Phil Hartman. Hartman insisted on auditioning for the role, and "just nailed it" according to Groening. Due to Hartman's death, West was given the role. West states that his version of Zapp Brannigan was an imitation of Hartman and also "modeled after a couple of big dumb announcers I knew".

Katey Sagal voiced Leela, and is the only member of the main cast to voice only one character. The role of Leela was originally assigned to Nicole Sullivan. In an interview in June 2010, Sagal remarked that she did not know that another person was to originally voice Leela until many years after the show first began.

John DiMaggio performed the voice of the robot Bender Bending Rodríguez and other, more minor, characters. Bender was the most difficult character to cast, as the show's creators had not decided what a robot should sound like. DiMaggio originally auditioned for the role of Professor Farnsworth, using the voice he uses to perform Bender, and also auditioned for Bender using a different voice. DiMaggio described Bender's voice as a combination of a sloppy drunk, Slim Pickens and a character his college friend created named "Charlie the sausage-lover".

Phil LaMarr voices Hermes Conrad, his son Dwight, Ethan Bubblegum Tate, and Reverend Preacherbot. Lauren Tom voices Amy Wong, and Tress MacNeille voices Mom and various other characters. Maurice LaMarche voices Kif Kroker and several supporting characters. LaMarche won the Emmy Award for Outstanding Voice-Over Performance in 2011 for his performances as Lrrr and Orson Welles in the episode "Lrrreconcilable Ndndifferences". David Herman voiced Scruffy and various supporting characters. During seasons 1–4, LaMarche is billed as supporting cast and Tom, LaMarr and Herman billed as guest stars, despite appearing in most episodes. LaMarche was promoted to main cast and Tom, LaMarr and Herman to supporting cast in season 5, and promoted again to main cast in season 6.

Main cast members
Billy West	Katey Sagal	John DiMaggio	Tress MacNeille	Maurice LaMarche	Lauren Tom	Phil LaMarr	David Herman
Billy West	Katey Sagal	John DiMaggio	Tress MacNeille	Maurice LaMarche	Lauren Tom	Phil LaMarr	David Herman
Philip J. Fry, Professor Farnsworth, Doctor Zoidberg, Zapp Brannigan, Richard Nixon's Head, Smitty, Leo Wong	Leela	Bender, Elzar, URL (1999–2013), Joey Mousepad, Igner, Robot Santa, Flexo, Sal, Barbados Slim	Mom, Hattie McDoogal, Tinny Tim, Ndnd, Turanga Munda, Linda van Schoonhoven, Guenther, Petunia	Kif Kroker, Morbo, Lrrr, Calculon, The Donbot, Clamps, Hedonismbot, Dr. Perceptron, Walt, Axl	Amy Wong, Inez Wong, Jrrr, Mandy, Newt	Hermes Conrad, Dwight Conrad, Reverend Lionel Preacherbot, Robot 1-X, iZac	Scruffy, Roberto, Mayor Poopenmeyer, Dr. Ogden Wernstrom, Turanga Morris, Larry

In addition to the main cast, Frank Welker voiced Nibbler and Kath Soucie voiced Cubert and several supporting and minor characters. Like The Simpsons, many episodes of Futurama feature guest voices from a wide range of professions, including actors, entertainers, bands, musicians, and scientists. Many guest-stars voiced supporting characters, although many voiced themselves, usually as their own head preserved in a jar. Recurring guest stars included Tom Kenny, Dan Castellaneta (as the Robot Devil), Dawnn Lewis, Nicole St. John, Al Gore, Phil Hendrie, Coolio and George Takei, among others. Bumper Robinson used to be a cast member of the series (who played Hermes' son Dwight), but left the series after season 4 which caused Phil LaMarr to take over the role afterwards. John Goodman was meant to reprise the role of Robot Santa after "Xmas Story" in future episodes but was unable to reprise the role due to scheduling problems. As a result, John DiMaggio took over that role starting with "A Tale of Two Santas". In that same episode, Dan Castellaneta was unable to reprise the Robot Devil due to his work on The Simpsons. Maurice LaMarche took over that role for that episode only as Castellaneta did reprise the role in future episodes. Following Coolio's death in 2022, David X. Cohen has revealed on TMZ that he recorded new dialogue for Kwanzaabot before his death in an upcoming episode, scheduled to be released in 2023.

=== Animation ===
Computer-generated explosion from the episode "The Sting" (season 4)

Futurama is animated by Rough Draft Studios in Glendale, California and South Korea. The American studio would receive the completed script of an episode and create a storyboard consisting of more than 100 drawings. It would then produce a pencil-drawn animatic with 1,000 frames. Rough Draft's sister studio in Korea would render the 30,000-frame finished episode.

In addition to traditional cartoon drawing, Rough Draft Studios often used CGI for fast or complex shots, such as the movement of spaceships, explosions, nebulae, large crowds, and snow scenes. The opening sequence was entirely rendered in CGI. The CGI was rendered at 24 frames per second (as opposed to hand-drawn often done at 12 frames per second) and the lack of artifacts made the animation appear very smooth and fluid. CGI characters looked slightly different due to spatially "cheating" hand-drawn characters by drawing slightly out of proportion or off-perspective features to emphasize traits of the face or body, improving legibility of an expression. PowerAnimator and Maya were used to draw the comic-like CGI whilst Toonz was used for digital ink and paint and compositing.

The series began high-definition production in season 5, with Bender's Big Score. The opening sequence was re-rendered and scaled to adapt to the show's transition to 16:9 widescreen format.

For the final episode of season 6, Futurama was completely reanimated in three different styles: the first segment of the episode features black-and-white Fleischer- and Walter Lantz-style animation, the second was drawn in the style of a low-resolution video game, and the final segment was in the style of Japanese anime.

Beginning with season 8, Digital eMation also handles the overseas animation along with Rough Draft Korea.

== Hallmarks ==
=== Opening sequence ===
Much like the opening sequence in The Simpsons with its chalkboard gags, Lisa's sax solo, and couch gags, Futurama has a distinctive opening sequence featuring minor gags. As the show begins, blue lights fill the screen and the Planet Express Ship flies across the screen with the title of the show being spelled out in its wake. Underneath the title is a joke caption such as "Painstakingly drawn before a live audience" or "When you see the robot: DRINK!" After flying through downtown New New York and past various recurring characters, the Planet Express ship crashes through a large screen showing a short clip from a classic cartoon. These have included clips from Quasi at the Quackadero, Looney Tunes and Merrie Melodies shorts, cartoons produced by Fleischer Studios and Famous Studios, a short of The Simpsons from a Tracey Ullman episode, the show's own opening sequence in "The Devil's Hands Are Idle Playthings" or a scene from the episode. Most episodes in Season 6 and Season 7 use an abridged opening sequence, omitting the brief clip of a classic cartoon. "Rebirth", "That Darn Katz!", "Benderama", "Yo Leela Leela", "Decision 3012", "Forty Percent Leadbelly", "T.: The Terrestrial", "Leela and the Genestalk", and "Stench and Stenchability" have been the only episodes since "Spanish Fry" to feature a classic cartoon clip. Several episodes begin with a cold opening before the opening sequence, although these scenes do not always correspond with the episode's plot. The opening sequence has been lampooned several times within the show, in episodes including "That's Lobstertainment!", "The Problem with Popplers", as "Future-roma" in "The Duh-Vinci Code" and as "Futurella" in "Lrrreconcilable Ndndifferences". "Decision 3012" and "The Problem with Popplers" are the only episodes that directly tie into the opening, with Bender deliberately crashing the ship after seeing an advertisement for free beer in "Decision 3012", while in "The Problem with Popplers", Leela crashes through it during an ad for Popplers, with Fry saying "That's the second billboard you've crashed through this week!". "Viva Mars Vegas" features a unique handmade variant of the opening, using cardboard, plastic, and model ships guided by strings and rods.

Series director Scott Vanzo has remarked on the difficulty of animating the sequence. It took four to five weeks to fully animate the sequence, and it consists of over 80 levels of 3D animation composited together. It takes approximately one hour to render a single frame, and each second of the sequence consists of around 30 frames.

The Futurama theme was created by Christopher Tyng. The theme is played on the tubular bells but is occasionally remixed for use in specific episodes, including a version by the Beastie Boys used for the episode "Hell Is Other Robots", in which they guest starred as their own heads for both a concert and as part of the Robot Devil's song. The original version of the theme also samples a drum break originating from "Amen, Brother" by American soul group The Winstons. The theme has been noted for its similarities to Pierre Henry's 1967 Psyché Rock.

It was originally intended for the Futurama theme to be remixed in every episode. This was first tried in the opening sequence for "Mars University", however it was realized upon broadcast that the sound did not transmit well through most television sets and the idea was subsequently abandoned. Despite this, beatbox renditions of the theme performed by Billy West and John DiMaggio are used for the episodes "Bender Should Not Be Allowed on TV" and "Spanish Fry".

As the series began high-definition production in 2007 with the four direct-to-DVD movies and season 6 on Comedy Central, the opening sequence was updated to match, and a slightly slower and revamped remix of the theme song, which replaced the Amen break with a higher-fidelity drum recording and was previously used in the Futurama video game, replaced the original theme. Bender's Big Score has an extended opening sequence, introducing each of the main characters. In The Beast with a Billion Backs and Bender's Game the ship passes through the screen's glass and temporarily becomes part of the environment depicted therein—a pastiche of Disney's Steamboat Willie and Yellow Submarine respectively—before crashing through the screen glass on the way out. In Into the Wild Green Yonder, a completely different opening sequence involves a trip through a futuristic version of Las Vegas located on Mars. The theme tune is sung by Family Guy and American Dad! creator Seth MacFarlane and is different from the standard theme tune. The end of the film incorporates a unique variation of the opening sequence; as the Planet Express Ship enters a wormhole, it converts into a pattern of lights similar to the lights that appear in the opening sequence. All four movies' end credits utilized an edited version from the full-length remix of the theme instead of the original end credits theme, and an even shorter edit was introduced in season 6. Another update of the opening sequence in season 8 for Hulu added more visual gags, and the end credits theme was replaced again with an edit of the 2012 digital download release version, which added an extra layer of beats.

=== Languages ===
Alien Language 1 and its equivalent Latin characters

There are three alternative alphabets that appear often in the background of episodes, usually in the forms of graffiti, advertisements, or warning labels. Nearly all messages using alternative scripts transliterate directly into English. The first alphabet consists of abstract characters and is referred to as Alienese, a simple substitution cipher from the Latin alphabet. The second alphabet uses a more complex modular addition code, where the "next letter is given by the summation of all previous letters plus the current letter". The codes often provide additional jokes for fans dedicated enough to decode the messages. The third language sometimes used is Hebrew. Aside from these alphabets, most of the displayed wording on the show uses the Latin alphabet.

The show predicts that several English expressions will have evolved by the year 3000. For example, in the show the word Christmas has been replaced with Xmas (pronounced "ex-mas"), and the word ask with aks (pronounced axe). According to David X. Cohen, it is a running joke that the French language is extinct in the Futurama universe (though the culture remains alive), much like Latin is in the present. In the French dubbing of the show, German is used as the extinct language instead.

=== 30th Century Fox ===
A modified version of the 20th Century Fox Television logo is displayed at the end of each episode, reading "30th Century Fox Television" to fit the show's setting in the 31st century. Syndicated episodes use a 30th Television closing logo instead of the 20th Television one, while episodes from Season 8 onward use a 30th Television Animation logo. Initially, Fox did not want this logo to be used on the show, but when creator Matt Groening purchased the rights to the logo, the network had a change of heart and allowed the altered version to be aired.

=== Humor ===
Although the series uses a wide range of styles of humor, including self-deprecation, black comedy, off-color humor, slapstick, and surreal humor, its primary source of comedy is its satirical depiction of everyday life in the future and its parodical comparisons to the present. Groening notes that, from the show's conception, his goal was to make what was, on the surface, a goofy comedy that would have underlying "legitimate literary science fiction concepts". The series contrasted "low culture" and "high culture" comedy; for example, Bender's catchphrase is the insult "Bite my shiny metal ass" while his most terrifying nightmare is a vision of the number 2, a joke referring to the binary numeral system (Fry assures him, "there's no such thing as two").

The series developed a cult following partially due to the large number of in-jokes it contains, most of which are aimed at "nerds". In commentary on the DVD releases, David X. Cohen points out and sometimes explains his "nerdiest joke[s]". These included mathematical jokes – such as "Loew's $\aleph_0$-plex" (aleph-null-plex) movie theater – as well as various forms of science humor – for example, Professor Farnsworth, at a racetrack, complains about the use of a quantum finish to decide the winner, exclaiming "No fair! You changed the outcome by measuring it", a reference to the uncertainty principle of quantum mechanics. In the season six episode "Law and Oracle", Fry and the robot peace officer URL track down a traffic violator who turns out to be Erwin Schrödinger, the 20th-century quantum physicist. On the front seat of the car is a box, and when questioned about the contents, Schrödinger replies "A cat, some poison, and a cesium atom". Fry asks if the cat is alive or dead, and Schrödinger answers "It's a superposition of both states until you open the box and collapse the wave function." When Fry opens the box, the cat jumps out and attacks him. The run is a reference to the Schrödinger's cat thought experiment of quantum mechanics. The series makes passing references to quantum chromodynamics (the appearance of Strong Force-brand glue), computer science (two separate books in a closet labeled P and NP respectively, referring to the possibility that P and NP-complete problem classes are distinct), electronics (an X-ray – or more accurately, an "F-ray" – of Bender's head reveals a 6502 microprocessor), and genetics (a mention of Bender's "robo- or R-NA").

The show often features subtle references to classic science fiction. These are most often to Star Trek – many soundbites are used in homage – but also include the reference to the origin of the word robot made in the name of the robot-dominated planet Chapek 9, and the black rectangular monolith labeled "Out of Order" in orbit around Jupiter (a reference to Arthur C. Clarke's Space Odyssey series). Bender and Fry sometimes watch a television show called The Scary Door, a humorous parody of The Twilight Zone.

Journalist/critic Frank Lovece in Newsday contrasted the humor tradition of Groening's two series, finding that

The Simpsons echoes the strains of American-Irish vaudeville humor – the beer-soaked, sneaking-in-late-while-the-wife's-asleep comedy of Harrigan and Hart, McNulty and Murray, the Four Cohans (which, yes, included George M.) and countless others: knockabout yet sentimental, and ultimately about the bonds of blood family. Futurama, conversely, stems from Jewish-American humor, and not just in the obvious archetype of Dr. Zoidberg. From vaudeville to the Catskills to Woody Allen, it's that distinctly rueful humor built to ward away everything from despair to petty annoyance – the 'You gotta do what you gotta do' philosophy that helps the Futurama characters cope in a mega-corporate world where the little guy is essentially powerless.

Animation maven Jerry Beck concurred:

I'm Jewish, and I know what you're saying. Fry has that [type of humor], Dr. Zoidberg, all the [vocal artist] Billy West characters. I see it. The bottom line is, the producers are trying to make sure the shows are completely different entities.

In an interview with Diego Molano, creator of Victor and Valentino, in April 2019, he said that he found Futurama "incredibly influential", calling the humor smart but "not alienating". He added that it makes him "feel smart" and adding that Groening's "sense of comedic timing is masterful".

== Cancellations, syndications and revivals ==
=== Fox cancellation ===
Groening and Cohen wanted Futurama to be shown at 8:30 pm on Sunday, following The Simpsons. The Fox network disagreed, opting instead to show two episodes in the Sunday night lineup before moving the show to a regular time slot on Tuesday. Beginning with its second broadcast season, Futurama was again placed in the 8:30 pm Sunday spot, but by mid-season the show was moved again, this time to 7:00 pm on Sunday, its third position in less than a year. Even by the fourth season, Futurama was being aired erratically. Because the show was regularly pre-empted by sporting events, it became difficult to predict when new episodes would air. The erratic schedule resulted in Fox not airing several episodes that had been produced for seasons three and four, instead holding them for a fifth broadcast season. According to Groening, Fox executives were not supporters of the show. Although Futurama was never officially cancelled, midway through the production of the fourth season, Fox decided to stop buying episodes of Futurama, letting it go out of production before the fall 2003 lineup.

=== Adult Swim reruns ===
In 2003, Cartoon Network acquired syndication rights to Futurama and Family Guy, another animated show Fox had cancelled, for its Adult Swim block. Both shows proved to be successful immediately, leading to sister network TBS picking up the show later in 2003. The run on Adult Swim revived interest in both series, and when Family Guy found success in direct-to-DVD productions, Futurama's producers decided to try the same. In 2005, Comedy Central entered negotiations to take over the syndication rights, during which they discussed the possibility of producing new episodes. In 2006, it was announced that four straight-to-DVD films would be produced, and later split into 16 episodes comprising a fifth season of the show. Since no new Futurama projects were in production at the time of release, the final movie release Into the Wild Green Yonder was designed to stand as the Futurama series finale. However, Groening had expressed a desire to continue the franchise in some form, including a theatrical film. In an interview with CNN, Groening said that "we have a great relationship with Comedy Central and we would love to do more episodes for them, but I don't know... We're having discussions and there is some enthusiasm but I can't tell if it's just me." Futurama left Adult Swim's lineup on December 31, 2007, following a week-long marathon of the entire series. Comedy Central began airing the show the next day, with season 5 making its broadcast debut on March 23, 2008.

=== Comedy Central revival ===
In June 2009, 20th Century Fox Television announced that Comedy Central had picked up the show for 26 new half-hour episodes that began airing on June 24, 2010. The returning writing crew was smaller than the original crew. It was originally announced that main voice actors West, DiMaggio, and Sagal would return as well, but on July 17, 2009, it was announced that a casting notice was posted to replace the entire cast when 20th Century Fox Television would not meet their salary demands. The situation was later resolved, and the entire original voice-cast returned for the new episodes.

Near the end of a message from Maurice LaMarche sent to members of the "Save the Voices of Futurama" group on Facebook, LaMarche announced that the original cast would be returning for the new episodes. The Toronto Star confirmed, announcing on their website that the original cast of Futurama signed contracts with Fox to return for 26 more episodes. Similarly, an email sent to fans from Cohen and Groening reported that West, Sagal, DiMaggio, LaMarche, MacNeille, Tom, LaMarr, and Herman would all be returning for the revival.

Cohen told Newsday in August 2009 that the reported 26-episode order means "[i]t will be up to 26. I can't guarantee it will be 26. But I think there's a pretty good chance it'll be exactly 26. Fox has been a little bit cagey about it, even internally. But nobody's too concerned. We're plunging ahead". Two episodes were in the process of being voice-recorded at that time, with an additional "six scripts ... in the works, ranging in scale from 'it's a crazy idea that someone's grandmother thought of' to 'it's all on paper'.

When Futurama aired June 24, 2010, on Comedy Central, it helped the network to its highest-rated night in 2010 and its highest-rated Thursday primetime in the network's history. In March 2011, it was announced that Futurama had been renewed for a seventh season, consisting of at least 26 episodes, scheduled to air in 2012 and 2013. The first episode of season 7 premiered June 20, 2012, on Comedy Central.

Due to the uncertain future of the series, there have been four designated series finales. "The Devil's Hands Are Idle Playthings", Into the Wild Green Yonder, "Overclockwise", and "Meanwhile" have all been written to serve as a final episode for the show.

=== Comedy Central cancellation ===
Comedy Central announced in April 2013 that they would be airing the then final episode "Meanwhile" on September 4, 2013. The producers said that they are exploring options for the future of the series as "[they] have many more stories to tell", but would gauge fan reaction to the news. Groening and Cohen had previously expressed a desire to produce a theatrical film or another direct-to-video film upon conclusion of the series.

In an August 2013 interview with Milwaukee Journal Sentinel, Katey Sagal said regarding the series finale, "So I don't believe it... I just hold out hope for it because it has such a huge fan base, it's such a smart show, and why wouldn't somebody want to keep making that show; so that's my thought, I'm just in denial that it's over". Sagal also mentioned during the same interview that Groening told her at Comic-Con that "we'll find a place" and "don't worry, it's not going to end".

=== Simpsorama ===
The Simpsons episode "Simpsorama" is an official crossover with Futurama. It originally aired during the twenty-sixth season of The Simpsons on Fox on November 9, 2014, over a year after the Futurama series finale aired on Comedy Central.

=== Syndication ===
In July 2011, it was reported that the show had been picked up for syndication by both local affiliates and WGN America. Broadcast of old episodes began in September 2011. On September 19, 2011, WGN America began re-running Futurama, carrying it until 2014. Futurama doubled its viewership in syndication in 2012.

In October 2017, Syfy announced that they had acquired syndication rights to all 140 episodes of Futurama, adding it to its lineup on November 11, 2017, with a weekend long marathon. Futurama was Syfy's first American animated series (the network had an anime programming block in the past), and eventually became paired with Syfy's TZGZ block of animated original series on Saturday nights. Comedy Central continued to air the series concurrently with Syfy, usually in the mornings and early afternoon. Syfy aired episodes from the first four seasons cropped to 16:9 instead of airing them in their original 4:3 aspect ratio; Comedy Central (since 2017) and FXX would do the same.

In September 2021, FXX, which already carries The Simpsons and other 20th Television animated programming, announced that it would begin airing Futurama that November. Syfy stopped airing the show on November 10, 2021, and FXX began airing the show on November 15, 2021. Adult Swim then picked the show back up on December 27, 2021. Unlike FXX, Adult Swim airs the first four seasons in their original 4:3 aspect ratio, pillarboxed. However, seasons 5 through 7, which were produced in 16:9, are cropped to 4:3. Comedy Central held the rights to the series, usually airing it in the early morning, but was since dropped as of September 19, 2025, with The Cleveland Show aired in its place at the begin and then later by South Park, while Adult Swim dropped the show of the lineup as well after December 27, 2025, remaining on FXX in exclusive on the meantime.

=== Hulu revival ===
In February 2022, Hulu revived the series with a 20-episode order to premiere in 2023. At the time of the announcement, the majority of the main voice cast was set to return, while John DiMaggio was still in negotiations. The next day, Disney+ (Hulu's partner streaming service) announced in a press release that the new season would stream internationally as a Star Original. DiMaggio stated that he had not accepted the role in mid-February 2022 because he believed the entire cast of Futurama should be paid more. He stated, "Bender is part of my soul and nothing about this is meant to be disrespectful to the fans or my Futurama family. It's about self-respect. And honestly, [it's about] being tired of an industry that's become far too corporate and takes advantage of artists' time and talent... I wish I could give you every detail so you would understand, but it's not my place."

In March, DiMaggio officially rejoined the series after working out a new deal, calling the prior events "Bendergate". He later revealed that he did not get a raise, "but what I did get was a lot of respect". Had he not returned, Bender would have been voiced by a different guest star in each episode. In August 2022, the titles of the first ten episodes were announced by Hulu, and by November 2022, the production team was aiming to complete the episodes by the end of the year. In February 2023, a new release date was set sometime around the 2023 summer season. On May 18, 2023, a teaser trailer was released, announcing the premiere date as July 24, 2023. This second revival has alternatively been titled the eighth and ninth seasons (production) and the eleventh and twelfth seasons (broadcast). With the revival on Hulu, the season carries a new version of the opening title sequence, containing a briefly altered name "Hulurama" before reverting to "Futurama".

On November 2, 2023, Hulu renewed the series for tenth and eleventh production seasons; a total of 20 episodes were ordered for the new seasons, which will air from 2025 to 2026. All of season ten was released on Hulu on September 15, 2025, while FXX began airing new episodes weekly the same day. The eleventh season premiered on August 3, 2026.

On July 25, 2026, Matt Groening, the series’ executive producers and cast announced during a panel discussion at the 2026 San Diego Comic-Con that Hulu had ordered 3 new extended-length specials, ahead of the season eleven premiere. Hulu would confirm this as well. The first of these new specials, set to have a Christmas theme, will premiere in 2027.

== Reception ==
=== Critical response ===
Critical response of Futurama
Season	Rotten Tomatoes
1	82% (38 reviews)
5	100% (7 reviews)
6	100% (16 reviews)
7	92% (12 reviews)
8	86% (29 reviews)
9	64% (11 reviews)
10	100% (7 reviews)

The show received critical acclaim. The first season holds an 82% approval rating at review aggregator site Rotten Tomatoes, based on 32 reviews, an average rating of 8.75/10. The critical consensus reads, "Good news, everyone! Futurama is an inventive, funny, and sometimes affecting look at the world of tomorrow." Season 5 holds a rating of 100%, based on seven reviews, and an average score of 8.67/10. Season 6 has an approval rating of 100%, based on 16 reviews, and the average rating is 8.31/10. The website's critical consensus states, "Good news everyone! Futurama is as funny and endearing as ever in its sixth season." The next season received a rating of 92%, and an 8.24/10 average score based on 12 reviews. The critics consensus reads, "Futurama makes the most of its second life with biting social satire, kooky sci-fi scenarios, and a stirringly sweet series finale." For the eighth season, (Note: Rotten Tomatoes uses FOX's broadcast order, listing the show as eleven seasons; the eighth season is labeled "season 11", but reviews of previous seasons are included following the production order.) 86% of 29 reviews are positive, while the consensus states, "Shut up and take our money!". In 2013, TV Guide ranked Futurama on its list of the "60 Greatest TV Cartoons of All Time".

=== Ratings ===
Viewership and ratings per season of Futurama
Season	Timeslot (ET)	Network	Episodes	First aired		Last aired		TV season	Viewership rank	Avg. viewers (millions)
Season	Timeslot (ET)	Network	Episodes	Date	Viewers (millions)	Date	Viewers (millions)	TV season	Viewership rank	Avg. viewers (millions)
1	Sunday 8:30 pm (1–2); Tuesday 8:30 pm (3–9)	Fox	13	March 28, 1999	–	May 18, 1999	–	1998–1999	89	8.9
2	Sunday 8:30 pm (1–8); Sunday 7:00 pm (9–20)	Fox	19	September 26, 1999	–	May 21, 2000	–	1999–2000	–	–
3	Sunday 7:00 pm	Fox	22	November 5, 2000	–	May 13, 2001	–	2000–2001	–	–
4	Sunday 7:00 pm	Fox	18	December 9, 2001	–	April 21, 2002	–	2001–2002	115	5.9
5	Sunday 7:00 pm	Fox	16	November 10, 2002	–	August 10, 2003	–	2002–2003	–	–
6	Thursday 10:00 pm (1, 3–14, 16–26); Thursday 10:30 pm (2, 15)	Comedy; Central	26	June 24, 2010	2.92	September 8, 2011	1.48	2010–2011	–	–
7	Wednesday 10:00 pm (1, 3–12, 14, 16–26); Wednesday 10:30 pm (2, 13, 15)	Comedy; Central	26	June 20, 2012	1.57	September 4, 2013	2.21	2012–2013	–	–

Futurama's 7:00 p.m. Sunday time slot caused the show to often be pre-empted by sports and usually have a later-than-average season premiere. It also allowed the writers and animators to get ahead of the broadcast schedule so that episodes intended for one season were not aired until the following season. By the beginning of the fourth broadcast season, all the episodes to be aired that season had already been completed and writers were working at least a year in advance.

When Futurama debuted in the Fox Sunday night lineup at 8:30 p.m. between The Simpsons and The X-Files on March 28, 1999, it managed 19 million viewers, tying for 11th overall in that week's Nielsen ratings. The following week, airing at the same time, Futurama drew 14.2 million viewers. The third episode, the first airing on Tuesday, drew 8.85 million viewers. Though its ratings were well below The Simpsons, the first season of Futurama rated higher than competing animated series: King of the Hill, Family Guy, Dilbert, South Park, and The PJs.

When Futurama was effectively canceled in 2003, it had averaged 6.4 million viewers for the first half of its fourth broadcast season.

In late 2002, Cartoon Network acquired exclusive cable syndication rights to Futurama for a reported $10 million (equivalent to $17 million in 2025). In January 2003, the network began airing Futurama episodes as the centerpiece to the expansion of their Adult Swim cartoon block. Spanish-language Futurama reruns were broadcast on the NBC-owned mun2 cable network from March 3, 2003 to July 9, 2005. In October 2005, Comedy Central picked up the cable syndication rights to air Futurama's 72-episode run at the start of 2008, following the expiration of Cartoon Network's contract. A Comedy Central teaser trailer announced the return of Futurama March 23, 2008, which was Bender's Big Score divided into four episodes followed by the other three movies.

On June 24, 2010, the season 6 premiere, "Rebirth", drew 2.92 million viewers in the 10:00 p.m. time slot on Comedy Central. The second episode of the sixth season, "In-A-Gadda-Da-Leela", aired at 10:30 p.m., immediately following the season premiere. "In-A-Gadda-Da-Leela" drew 2.78 million viewers. This was the series' premiere on the network, with original episodes—the fifth season had previously aired on the network, but it had originally been released in the form of the four direct-to-video films.

Nielsen Media Research, which records viewership on certain American television screens, reported that Futurama accumulated 14.5 billion minutes of viewing across linear television and streaming platforms between September 22, 2025, and September 20, 2026, ranking as the fifteenth most-watched animated series during that period.

=== Accolades ===
Accolades for Futurama
Year	Award	Category	Nominee(s)	Result
1999	Annie Awards	Outstanding Achievement in an Animated Television Program	Futurama	Nominated
1999	Annie Awards	Outstanding Individual Achievement for Writing in an Animated Television Production	Ken Keeler ("The Series Has Landed")	Nominated
1999	Primetime Emmy Award	Outstanding Animated Program	"A Big Piece of Garbage"	Nominated
2000	Annie Awards	Outstanding Individual Achievement for Directing in an Animated Television Production	Brian Sheesley ("Why Must I Be a Crustacean in Love?")	Won
2000	Annie Awards	Outstanding Achievement in a Primetime or Late Night Animated Television Program	Futurama	Nominated
2000	Annie Awards	Outstanding Individual Achievement for Directing in an Animated Television Production	Susie Dietter ("A Bicyclops Built for Two")	Nominated
2000	Primetime Emmy Award	Outstanding Individual Achievement in Animation	Bari Kumar (color stylist) ("A Bicyclops Built for Two")	Won
2000	Environmental Media Awards	TV Episodic – Comedy	"The Problem with Popplers"	Won
2001	Annie Awards	Outstanding Individual Achievement for Voice Acting by a Male Performer in an Animated Television Production	John DiMaggio as Bender for "Bendless Love"	Won
2001	Annie Awards	Outstanding Individual Achievement for Writing in an Animated Television Production	Ron Weiner ("The Luck of the Fryrish")	Won
2001	Annie Awards	Outstanding Achievement in a Primetime or Late Night Animated Television Production	Futurama	Nominated
2001	Primetime Emmy Award	Outstanding Individual Achievement in Animation	Rodney Clouden (storyboard artist) ("Parasites Lost")	Won
2001	Primetime Emmy Award	Outstanding Animated Program	"Amazon Women in the Mood"	Nominated
2002	Primetime Emmy Award	Outstanding Animated Program	"Roswell That Ends Well"	Won
2002	Annie Awards	Outstanding Directing in an Animated Television Production	Rich Moore ("Roswell That Ends Well")	Won
2002	Annie Awards	Best Animated Television Production	Futurama	Nominated
2003	Annie Awards	Music in an Animated Television Production	Ken Keeler ("The Devil's Hands Are Idle Playthings")	Nominated
2003	Annie Awards	Writing in an Animated Television Production	Patric Verrone ("The Sting")	Nominated
2003	Primetime Emmy Award	Outstanding Animated Program	"Jurassic Bark"	Nominated
2003	Writers Guild of America Award	Animation	Ken Keeler ("Godfellas")	Won
2004	Primetime Emmy Award	Outstanding Animated Program	"The Sting"	Nominated
2004	Primetime Emmy Award	Outstanding Music and Lyrics	"I Want My Hands Back" ("The Devil's Hands Are Idle Playthings")	Nominated
2004	Nebula Award	Best Script	David A. Goodman ("Where No Fan Has Gone Before")	Nominated
2004	Writers Guild of America Award	Animation	Patric Verrone ("The Sting")	Nominated
2007	Annie Awards	Best Home Entertainment Production	Bender's Big Score	Won
2008	Annie Awards	Best Home Entertainment Production	The Beast with a Billion Backs	Won
2009	Annie Awards	Best Home Entertainment Production	Into the Wild Green Yonder	Won
2010	Annie Awards	Best Animated Television Production	Futurama	Nominated
2010	Annie Awards	Outstanding Writing in an Animated Television Production	Michael Rowe	Nominated
2011	Primetime Emmy Award	Outstanding Animated Program	"The Late Philip J. Fry"	Won
2011	Primetime Emmy Award	Outstanding Voice-Over Performance	Maurice LaMarche as Lrrr and Orson Welles ("Lrrreconcilable Ndndifferences")	Won
2011	Annie Awards	Best Writing in an Animated Television Production	Josh Weinstein ("All the Presidents' Heads")	Nominated
2011	Annie Awards	Editing in Television Production	Paul D. Calder	Nominated
2011	Environmental Media Awards	TV Episodic – Comedy	"The Futurama Holiday Spectacular"	Won
2011	Writers Guild of America	Animation	Ken Keeler ("The Prisoner of Benda")	Won
2011	Writers Guild of America	Animation	Patric Verrone ("Lrrreconcilable Ndndifferences")	Nominated
2012	Primetime Emmy Award	Outstanding Animated Program	"The Tip of the Zoidberg"	Nominated
2012	Primetime Emmy Award	Outstanding Voice-Over Performance	Maurice LaMarche as Clamps, Donbot, Hyper-Chicken, Calculon, Hedonism Bot and Morbo in "The Silence of the Clamps"	Won
2012	Annie Awards	Outstanding Achievement, Writing in an Animated Television or other Broadcast Venue Production	Eric Horsted ("The Bots and the Bees")	Nominated
2012	Writers Guild of America	Animation	Eric Rogers ("The Silence of the Clamps")	Nominated
2013	Annie Awards	Best General Audience Animated TV/Broadcast Production	Futurama	Won
2013	Annie Awards	Writing in an Animated TV/Broadcast Production	Lew Morton ("Murder on the Planet Express")	Won
2013	Annie Awards	Outstanding Achievement, Editorial in an Animated TV/Broadcast Production	Paul D. Calder	Nominated
2013	Writers Guild of America Award	Animation	Josh Weinstein ("A Farewell to Arms")	Nominated
2014	Primetime Emmy Award	Outstanding Animated Program	"Meanwhile"	Nominated
2014	Primetime Emmy Award	Outstanding Character Voice-Over Performance	Maurice LaMarche as Calculon and Morbo ("Calculon 2.0")	Nominated
2014	Writers Guild of America Award	Animation	Lew Morton ("Murder on the Planet Express")	Nominated
2014	Writers Guild of America Award	Animation	Michael Rowe ("Game of Tones")	Nominated
2014	Writers Guild of America Award	Animation	Patric Verrone ("Saturday Morning Fun Pit")	Nominated
2024	Writers Guild of America Award	Animation	Ariel Ladensohn ("I Know What You Did Next Xmas")	Nominated

=== Other honors ===
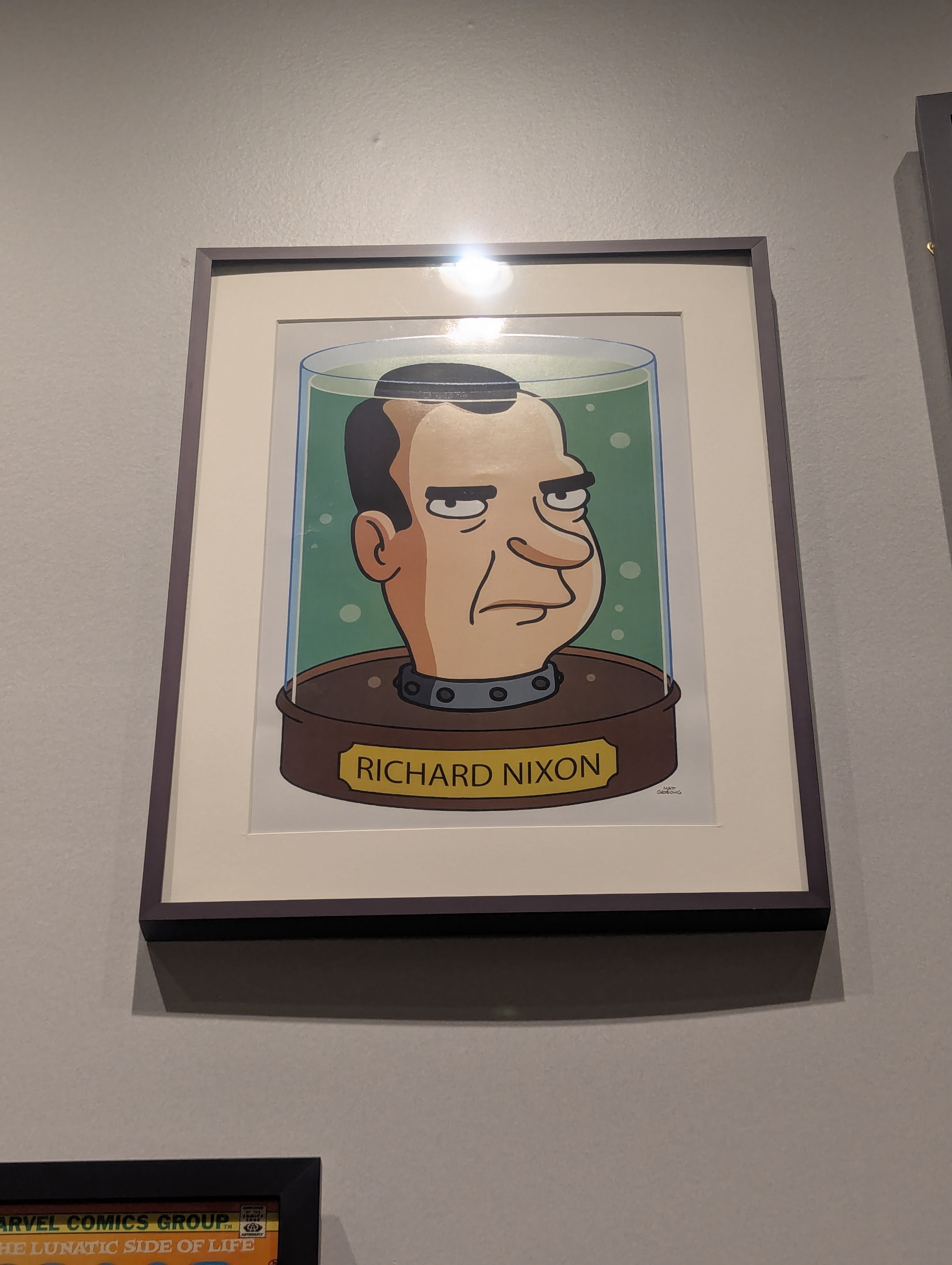
An illustration of the character Richard Nixon, President of Earth, on display at the Richard Nixon Presidential Library and Museum

- In January 2009, IGN named Futurama as the eighth best in the "Top 100 Animated TV Series".
- At the 2010 San Diego Comic-Con, Guinness World Records presented Futurama with the record for "Current Most Critically Acclaimed Animated Series".
- In 2020, Rolling Stone ranked it as the thirty-ninth best science fiction television show ever.

== Other media ==
=== Comic books ===
First started in November 2000 and lasting until July 2018, Futurama Comics is a comic book series published by Bongo Comics based in the Futurama universe. While originally published only in the US, a UK, German and Australian version of the series is also available. In addition, three issues were published in Norway. Other than a different running order and presentation, the stories are the same in all versions. While the comics focus on the same characters in the Futurama fictional universe, the comics may not be canonical as the events portrayed within them do not necessarily have any effect upon the continuity of the show.

Like the TV series, each comic (except US comic #20) has a caption at the top of the cover. For example: "Made In The USA! (Printed in Canada)". Some of the UK and Australian comics have different captions on the top of their comics (for example, the Australian version of #20 says "A 21st Century Comic Book" across the cover, while the US version does not have a caption on that issue). All series contain a letters page, artwork from readers, and previews of other upcoming Bongo comics.

Its final issue was on July 18, 2018, three months before Bongo Comics would shut down.

=== Films ===
When Comedy Central began negotiating for the rights to air Futurama reruns, Fox suggested that there was a possibility of also creating new episodes. Negotiations were already underway with the possibility of creating two or three direct-to-DVD films. When Comedy Central committed to sixteen new episodes, it was decided that four films would be produced. On April 26, 2006, Groening noted in an interview that co-creator David X. Cohen and numerous writers from the original series would be returning to work on the movies. All the original voice actors participated. In February 2007, Groening explained the format of the new stories: "[The crew is] writing them as movies and then we're going to chop them up, reconfigure them, write new material and try to make them work as separate episodes."

The first film, Bender's Big Score, was written by Ken Keeler and Cohen, and includes return appearances by the Nibblonians, Seymour, Barbados Slim, Robot Santa, the "God" space entity, Al Gore, and Zapp Brannigan. It was animated in widescreen and was released on standard DVD on November 27, 2007, with a possible Blu-ray Disc release to follow. A release on HD DVD was rumored but later officially denied. Futurama: Bender's Big Score was the first DVD release for which 20th Century Fox implemented measures intended to reduce the total carbon footprint of the production, manufacturing, and distribution processes. Where it was not possible to completely eliminate carbon, output carbon offsets were used, thus making the complete process carbon neutral.

The second movie, The Beast with a Billion Backs, was released on June 24, 2008. The third movie, Bender's Game, was released on DVD and Blu-ray Disc on November 3, 2008, in the UK, November 4, 2008, in the US, and December 10, 2008, in Australia. The fourth movie, Into the Wild Green Yonder, was released on DVD and Blu-ray Disc on February 24, 2009.

Following the series' revival, the show's executive producer Claudia Katz had announced more upcoming movies for Hulu while also hinting at a theatrical release.

=== Video games ===
On September 15, 2000, Unique Development Studios acquired the license to develop a Futurama video game for consoles and handheld systems. Fox Interactive signed on to publish the game. Sierra Entertainment later became the game's publisher, and it was released on August 14, 2003. Versions are available for PlayStation 2 and Xbox, both of which use cel-shading technology. However, the game was subsequently canceled on the GameCube and Game Boy Advance in North America and Europe.

In 2012, an app inspired by the head in a jar gag was launched by Matt Groening.

In September 2016, Futurama characters and content would be playable in a crossover free-to-play digital collectable card video game Animation Throwdown: The Quest for Cards, which also contained characters and content from other 20th Television Animation properties; particularly Family Guy, American Dad!, King of the Hill, Bob's Burgers, and Archer. The game was released on September 27, 2016 and is available for Android, iOS, Steam, Kartridge and on the web via the game's developer Kongregate.

Licensing for mobile games were done in 2016 with Futurama: Game of Drones and in 2017 with Futurama: Worlds of Tomorrow, which was released for Android and iOS in 2017.

On July 25, 2023, Fortnite released an update that included theme content centered on the show Futurama, including purchasable outfits. These outfits include Bender Bending Rodríguez, Philip J. Fry, and Turanga Leela, as well as other themed accessories. The weapon "Bender's Shiny Metal Raygun" has also been included in the game.

== See also ==
- Disenchantment
- Politics in Futurama
- Religion in Futurama
