= List of Disenchantment characters =

Disenchantment is an American adult animated television series starring Abbi Jacobson as Princess Bean, Eric André as Luci, and Nat Faxon as Elfo. The series' seasons are split into halves; the first season, consisting of twenty episodes, was released in two equal parts; the first ten episodes premiered on Netflix on August 17, 2018, and the second ten were released on September 20, 2019. The first half of season two, entitled Part 3, was released on January 15, 2021 and the second half of season two, entitled Part 4, was released on February 9, 2022. In August 2023, Netflix had announced that it would end production of Disenchantment after 5 years. The third and final season entitled Part 5 was released for the final time on September 1, 2023. The following is a list of characters featured in Disenchantment.

== Overview ==
Actor	Character	Part 1	Part 2	Part 3	Part 4	Part 5
Abbi Jacobson	Princess Bean	Main	Main	Main	Main	Main
Abbi Jacobson	Bad Bean				Main	Main
Nat Faxon	Elfo	Main	Main	Main	Main	Main
Eric André	Luci	Main	Main	Main	Main	Main
John DiMaggio	King Zøg	Main	Main	Main	Main	Main
John DiMaggio	Freckles	Silent	Recurring	Recurring	Recurring	Main
Tress MacNeille	Queen Oona	Main	Main	Recurring	Recurring	Recurring
Tress MacNeille	Prince Derek	Recurring	Recurring	Main	Main	Main
Tress MacNeille	Jasper				Main	Main
Maurice LaMarche	Odval	Main	Main	Main	Main	Main
Matt Berry	Prince Merkimer	Main	Main	Main		Main
Sharon Horgan	Queen Dagmar	Guest	Recurring	Recurring	Main	Main
Lauren Tom	Mop Girl	Recurring	Recurring	Recurring	Main	Main
Rich Fulcher	Satan			Recurring	Recurring	Main
Meredith Hagner	Mora			Guest	Guest	Main

== Primary characters ==
=== Princess Bean ===
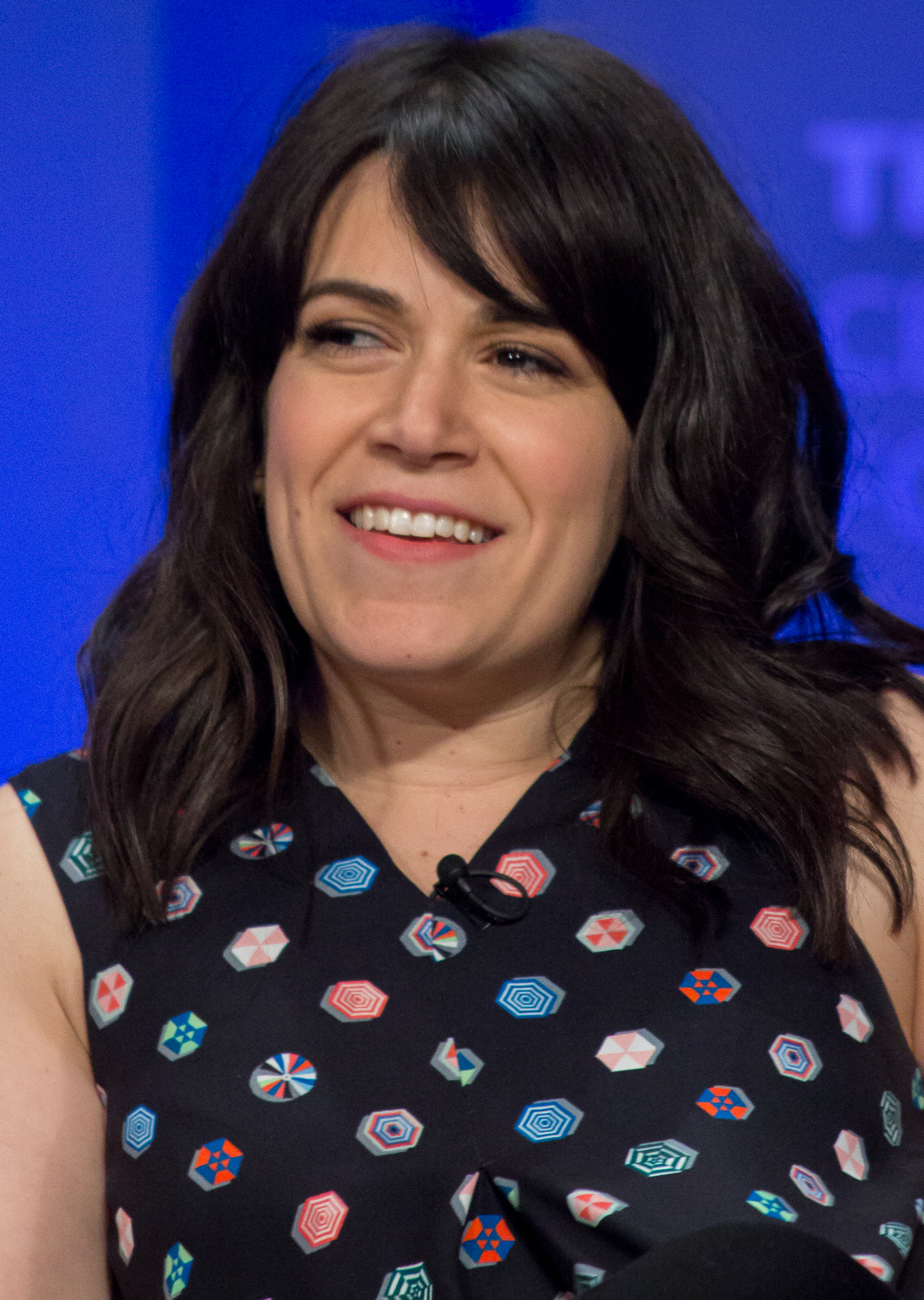
Abbi Jacobson voices Princess Bean

Princess Tiabeanie Mariabeanie de la Rochambeaux Grunkwitz, or Bean (voiced by Abbi Jacobson), is the drunk teenage princess of Dreamland. Bean, as the main character of the entire series, is the daughter of King Zøg and Queen Dagmar, but after Dagmar accidentally poisoned herself, Zøg married Queen Oona, who became Bean's stepmother. In the ninth episode, "To Thine Own Elf Be True", Bean must choose to either bring Dagmar or Elfo, both of whom previously died, back to life with the Eternity Pendant. Bean chooses Dagmar, which angers Elfo when he arrives in Hell and sees her decision. Dagmar orchestrates Dreamland's fall, and takes Bean on a boat to Maru, where Dagmar was from, to meet the entire family.

Bean often sneaks away to the local bar, The Flying Scepter (later renamed Luci's Inferno after Luci wins the bar in an arm-wrestling contest), to get away from her royal duties, and returns to the castle drunk. Bean calls herself "Drunkowitz" whenever she is drunk, as producer Josh Weinstein announced on Twitter after the first season was released.

At the end of the first season, Tiabeanie falls through the ground into the Catacombs, the tunnels that run under Dreamland's castle, and is met by Dagmar. In the beginning of the second season, Bean is angered at Dagmar for trying to grow close to her. She is proposed to by Alva Gunderson in part three, as Alva wants to access her magic. Bean is crowned queen after Zøg is deemed too crazy and unfit to rule the kingdom. At the very end of part 3, Bean is taken by Dagmar down to hell to marry off what appears to be Alva.

In part 4, Dagmar attempts to marry off what is revealed to be the Devil himself. During the ceremony, Bean cuts open Dagmar's palm and placed it on the paper, thus marrying off Dagmar to the Devil instead. Bean then meets up with Luci and Jerry who escape Hell together. They take the elevator directly to Alva's office in Steamland. Alva gives them his airship to go back to Dreamland. Once they get there, it is revealed that Maru annexed the kingdom. They're able to regain control of the Kingdom. Subsequently, Bean and Zøg agree to split the royalty 50/50. Bean has nightmares about "Bad Bean" who conquered Dreamland and is practically devoid of any empathy. Bad Bean comes into the regular realm and calls Dagmar, under the guise that she's the real Bean. Eventually, the two fight and the real Bean comes out of the fight victorious. Bean disguises herself as Bad Bean while Dagmar and Satan arrive via an elevator from Hell. Dagmar sees through Bean's facade, knocks her out, and throws her in the ocean, but she is saved at the last minute by Mora.

In part five, she gets into a soul bond with Mora. She also finally manages to defeat her mother and her rule of Dreamland.

The second season of the series reveals Bean to be bisexual, as is her voice actor, Abbi Jacobson, or pansexual.

=== Elfo ===
Elfo (voiced by Nat Faxon) is the socially awkward and shy elf companion and, for a while, love interest of Bean, and friend of Luci. At the beginning of season one, Elfo leaves his homeland of Elfwood in search of a better, sadder life, but near the end of the season, Elfo is killed by an unknown knight (which later is discovered to be his future self), after returning to Elfwood to plead with the elves for help. In part two, Bean and Luci are able to communicate with Elfo and tell him to go down to Hell, so they can find him and bring him back to life. Their attempts succeed, and Elfo's soul is returned to his body.

Later in the season, Elfo meets legendary elf Leavo, and almost kills him for his magical blood, which possessed the abilities to bring the residents of the kingdom of Dreamland back to life after Queen Dagmar turned them all to stone, but Elfo decides that it isn't right to kill Leavo and instead Leavo aids him in convincing the elves back at Elfwood to donate their blood. In the season two episode "The Electric Princess", Elfo becomes Luci's roommate. At the end of season two, Elfo is sentenced to death after being Bean's lawyer during her trial, but falls through the ground into the Catacombs right before he is about to be burned on the stake and is met by former Queen Dagmar. At the end of part 3, he gets kidnapped by an army of ogres.

In part 4, it is revealed that his mother is an ogre, thus making him half-ogre. It is also revealed that he has a half-brother who's an ogre. He was forced to fight his brother but his brother refused to fight him.

At the end of the series in season 5, Elfo becomes King of Dreamland, alongside Queen Mop Girl Miri of Dreamland, whom they end up marrying.

=== Luci ===
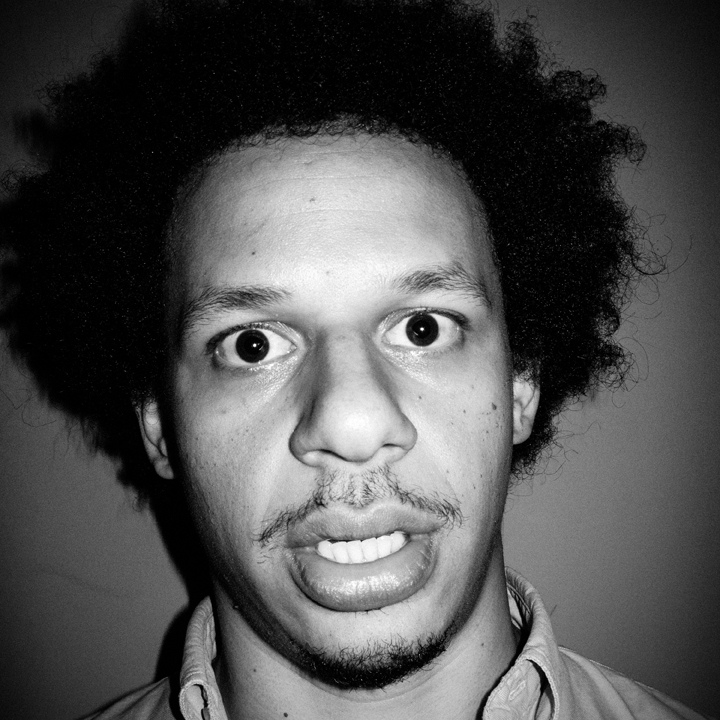
Eric André voices Luci the Demon

"Luci" Lucille Lucifer Jr. DCLXVI, Son of Satan (voiced by Eric André) is Bean's "personal demon" as he calls himself. He is a secretly morally-good (though wanting to be evil) black imp-like creature who was sent from the mysterious kingdom of Maru, as it is revealed in part two, and he develops a close friendship with both Elfo and Bean, even going to the lengths of sacrificing his immortality to betray his fellow demons and save Elfo, who died in part one. Luci is often seen smoking, and makes witty remarks and insults in addition to eating dead birds whole.

Luci was sent from Maru by Emperor Cloyd and his sister Rebecca to spy on Bean and corrupt her to be willing to go with Dagmar and become the new queen of Maru, but Luci grows close to Bean and Elfo, developing a really deep friendship with them, and even leaves Maru for them.

At the end of part three, Luci is decapitated by a secret elevator in Dreamland and ends up in Heaven, where he is greeted by God and Jerry.

In part four, Luci manages to convince God to send Jerry back to Earth. When Jerry is sent back down to Earth, he sneaks out of Heaven through Jerry. Thanks to the trogs giving his body without a head trog juice, he gets wings.

In part five, he is revealed to be the son of Satan; in the series finale, Satan decides to cross his name out of the Book of the Dead along with that of Bean and Mora, granting them all true immortality.

=== King Zøg ===
Zøg (voiced by John DiMaggio) is the overweight, hot-tempered king of Dreamland and the father of Bean and Derek. He first married Queen Dagmar, a "noble's daughter from a faraway kingdom" and had Bean, until Dagmar died of poison and Zøg remarried to Oona, a reptilian princess from Dankmire, and had Derek, Bean's half-brother. Zøg and Bean do not get along well, and he has gone so far as to try and attack her and her friends when he believes she has betrayed his kingdom. In spite of their fractured relationship, deep down they genuinely do care for each other, and become closer as the show progresses.

At the end of part one, after Zøg is betrayed by Dagmar, the entire kingdom of Dreamland is turned to stone. When Bean returns to the kingdom, Zøg thinks that she was working with Dagmar, but Bean saves him and convinces him that she was also blindsided. In part two, Zøg also befriends Prince Merkimer. After he is divorced by Oona, Zøg dates a selkie who is half bear and half woman, gets robbed by a troupe of circus elves who turn out to be trolls, and even tries to get Gout to impress a king from a faraway kingdom. After being buried alive in season two, Zøg grows mentally insane, and after a series of mere temporary solutions, he is taken away to the Twinkletown Insane Asylum in the end of the part.

In part four, King Zøg becomes a monk and shaves his head as a result. Once Maru loses control over Dreamland, he agrees to share the throne with Bean 50/50.

=== Queen Oona ===
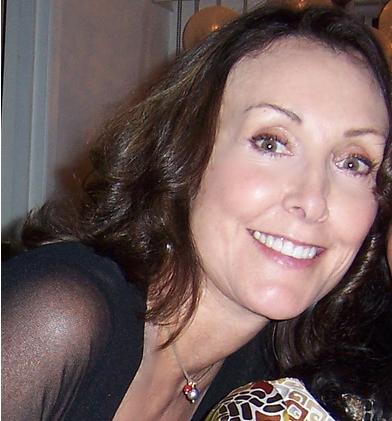
Tress MacNeille voices Queen Oona and Bonnie Prince Derek

Oona (voiced by Tress MacNeille) is Zøg's second wife and the queen of Dreamland during season one. Oona is Dankmirian, a race of humanoid reptiles, and doesn't know much about humans. In episode six, "Swamp and Circumstance", Bean, Elfo, Luci, and the rest of the team from Dreamland visit Oona's hometown of Dankmire, where Oona was class clown in school, and, in an attempt to be kind, end up being disrespectful and are chased out the city gates by the leaders of the country. Oona is also believed by Zøg to be the cause of Dreamland's fall in the end of part one instead of Dagmar.

In season two, Oona has a smaller part, and, after being thrown into the ocean by Dagmar who wants her dead, tries to warn Bean of Dagmar's betrayal. Bean does not hear her, and Oona is instead picked up by a band of pirates who are led by famed elf Leavo, who left Elfwood before Elfo and never came back. Oona convinces the pirates on the ship to be brave and actually raid other ships, and upon returning to Dreamland, she promptly divorces Zøg and sets off to captain the pirates in Leavo's absence when he decides to live in Elf Alley with the other elves. Oona returns in season two for Derek's wedding, which is eventually cancelled, and later helps Bean uncover the terrible secret about Odval's society.

=== Prince Derek ===
Derek (voiced by MacNeille) is the second child of Zøg and the first son of Oona. He is a 14-year-old mix Dankmirian and Dreamlander, and often looks up to his older half-sister Bean, who brushes him off, finding him annoying. Derek has a recurring nightmare about an increasingly large skillet due to having almost been cooked on one by hillbillies to be fed to the Swamp Monster in episode six, "Swamp and Circumstance". In the end of season one, fearing Oona's wrath, Zøg locks Derek up in the highest tower in the castle to keep him safe, but then forgets about him until a few episodes later in season, in "The Very Thing", after Oona and Zøg get a divorce, they then realize that Derek has been locked in the tower all this time. They rescue him and tell them of their divorce, and he takes it rather well.

Later, towards the end of the season, Derek is feeling especially blown off by Bean and when he asks if he can tag along with her to the pub, she says no. Derek scampers down to the beach and finds a small octopus which he names Slimy, and by the time he shows it to Elfo, who he has befriended, Slimy has grown into a giant creature. Slimy takes Derek captive, but Bean is able to save him, revealing that she does care about him. However, Bean's confession does not make it any harder to sentence Bean for death after shooting Zøg, Bean appearing to make an attempt to murder Zøg by removing the bullet that was lodged in his body with a knife and making Derek de facto King in his place, even though the shooting was an accident. When Derek is briefly king, he is influenced by Odval and the Arch Druidess into enacting a series of arbitrary edicts. Derek leaves with Oona to become a pirate.

In part four, Derek returns to Dreamland. Derek meets his half-brother Jasper, a human-bear mix. After Derek meets Freckles, he gets into a confrontation with a group of street bullies. He seems to kill one of the bullies, making him feel guilty. At the end of part four, Freckles convinces Derek, Jasper and Snarla the fairy run off to Steamland. When they arrive, Freckles sells Derek and Jasper to a freak show in Steamland.

=== Odval ===
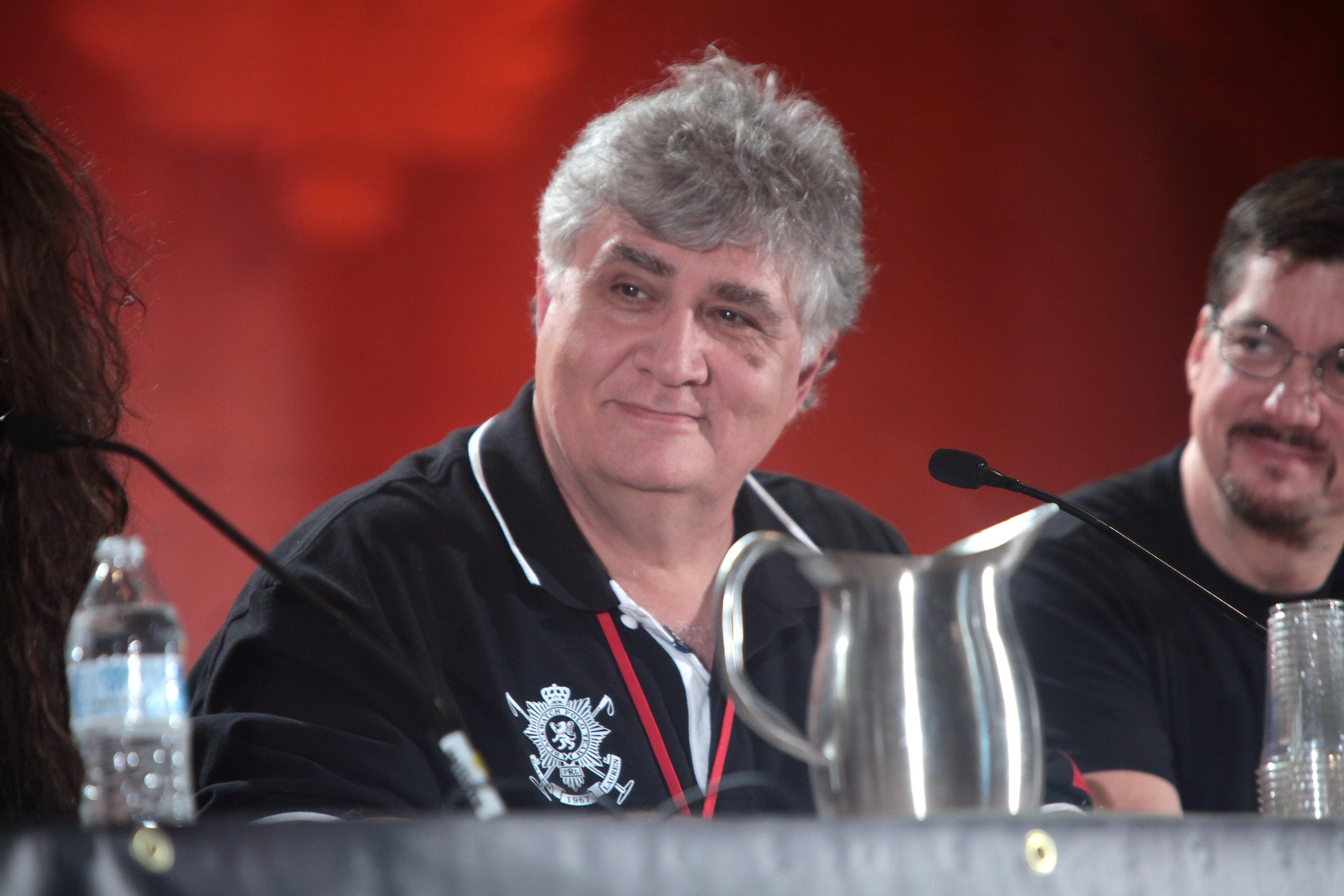
Maurice LaMarche voices Odval

Odval (voiced by Maurice LaMarche) was the three-eyed royal advisor to Zøg before he was dethroned for being too mentally incapacitated to rule. He is a Dreamlander who was constantly trying to undermine his rule and take control of the kingdom. This is, in fact, for good reason, as despite being later referred to by Zøg as a friend he was used, sometimes literally, as Zøg's personal punching bag, with Odval being helpless in the face of constant abuse due to Zøg's power as monarch being completely absolute. This constant mistreatment leads to Odval jumping at the chance to seize power, as soon as the very first opportunity presents itself. Odval is turned to stone by Dagmar in the end of part one, and is wheeled around by Zøg in a wagon, who takes comfort that his so-called friend is near him. After being brought back to life by the Eternity Pendant and the Elixir of life, Odval continues to run his secret society that operates in the shadows under the castle, first introduced in the part one episode "Castle Party Massacre".

After Zøg is accidentally shot by Bean, to Odval's glee, he and his partner in crime, the Arch Druidess, rigs Bean's trials and gets her sentenced to death by burning, as well as influencing the weak-minded de jure King Derek to do as they please. When Bean takes over as queen after Zøg is dethroned and committed to Twinkletown Insane Asylum, he remains an advisor but to Bean.

Odval is in a relationship with Sorcerio, the castle wizard. They get married in the series finale.

=== Prince Merkimer ===
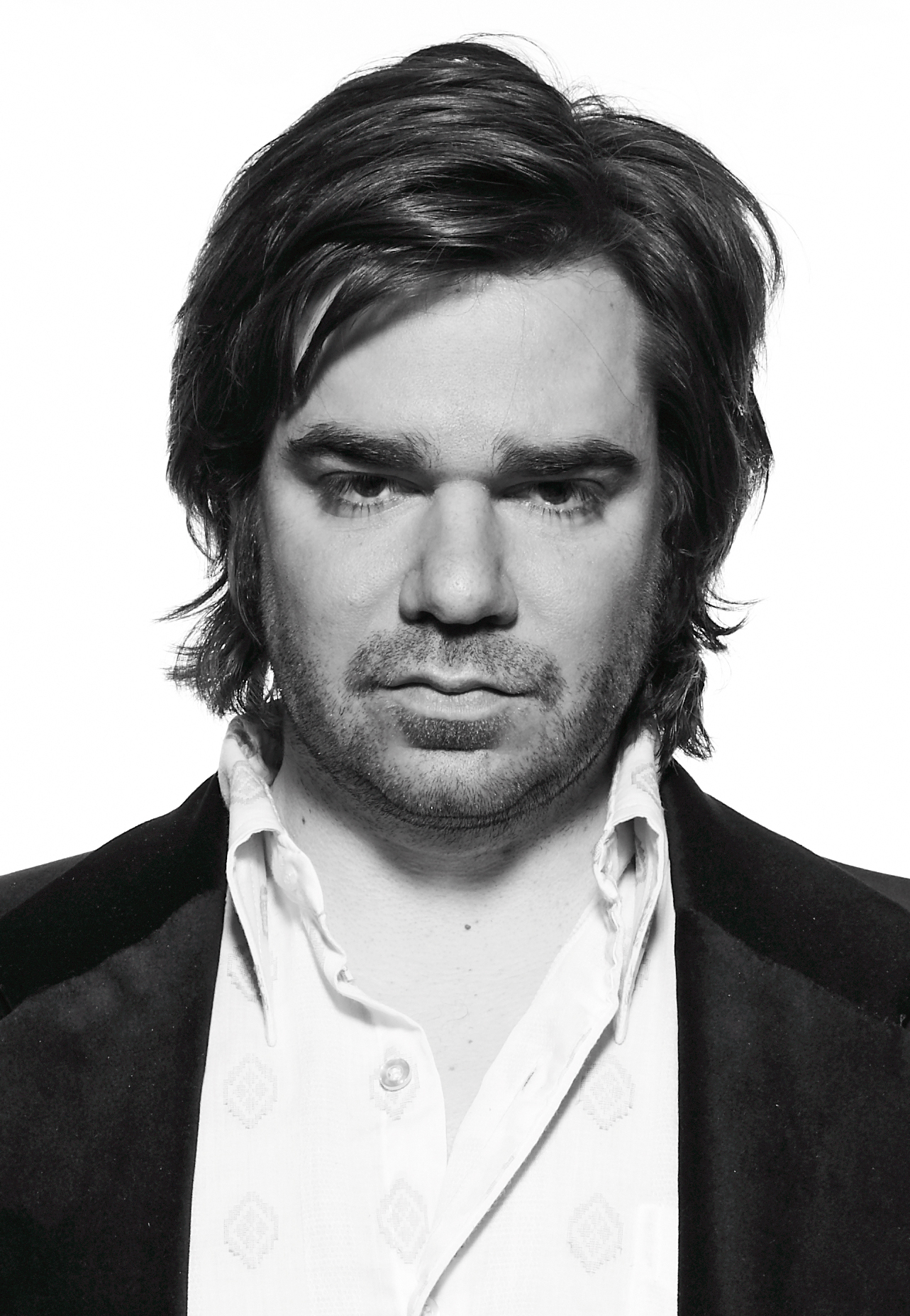
Matt Berry voices Prince Merkimer

Merkimer (voiced by Matt Berry) is the youngest son of the king and queen of Bentwood. He is set to marry Bean after his older brother Guysbert is killed, but drinks what he thinks is elf's blood before the wedding to boost his courage. It is actually pig's blood, and transforms into a hog while walking down the aisle. After that, he stays in Dreamland and hangs around the kingdom. After everyone else is turned to stone, Merkimer finds Zøg and they befriend each other until he insults Zøg. Later, he encourages Bean to write an autobiographical play, but takes credit for it and stars as Zøg. In season two, Merkimer meets his own body, which houses a pig's brain, and has learned to speak and become sentient. He does not appear in part 4, however he does appear in part 5. At the very end of the series he’s appointed Ambassador of Dreamland by the new Queen of Dreamland Miri.

=== Queen Dagmar ===
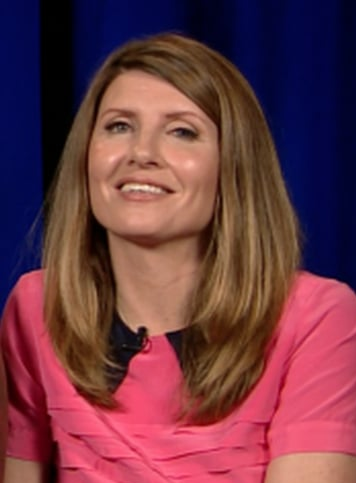
Sharon Horgan voices Queen Dagmar

Queen Dagmar (voiced by Sharon Horgan) is Bean's mother and Zøg's first wife. She was turned to stone when Bean was just a little girl, because her wine was poisoned. However, in "Dreamland Falls", Luci makes an important discovery and realizes that it was actually Dagmar who poisoned the wine, which was meant for Zøg, but Bean accidentally switched their glasses. In the penultimate episode of part one, Bean chooses to bring Dagmar back to life with the Eternity Pendant instead of Elfo, not knowing Dagmar's true intentions. Bean boards a boat with Dagmar and they head to Maru, leaving most of Dreamland turned to stone.

In part two, Dagmar introduces Bean to the rest of her family (Cloyd, Rebecca, and Jerry) but then tries to nail a crown to her head to make her the queen of Maru. Bean escapes and seemingly kills Dagmar, but she keeps appearing in her dreams, telling her she was meant for something bigger and even giving her a strange music box that Bean cannot get rid of. In the end of the season, Bean is about to be burned at the stake but instead falls through the ground and ends up in the Catacombs, a series of tunnels running under the Dreamland castle, and meets a still-alive Dagmar. In part three, Bean, Elfo, and Luci escape Dagmar, but she returns in the end to Dreamland and takes Bean to marry a mysterious man.

In part four, Dagmar attempted to marry off Bean to the Devil, who was revealed to be the "mysterious man" shown at the very end of part three. However, Bean cut open Dagmar's hand as part of the process to officiate the marriage and made her the one who married the Devil. Dagmar is invited by Bad Bean to the castle. Once Bean's ruse is discovered, she becomes livid and accidentally knocks out Bean. Dagmar then dumps an unconscious Bean into the ocean, all the while apathetic to what she did.

In part five, she becomes immortal, but is defeated by her daughter and imprisoned in a cage hanging from a cliff by Satan forever as punishment for what she did.

=== Mop Girl ===
Mop Girl (voiced by Lauren Tom) is an employee at The Jittery, a café, who convinces and supports Bean as she tries to become a successful author and playwright. She is also known as Mop Girl by the workers of the castle as she is often seen cleaning the castle with a mop. In part 4, she is promoted to Broom Girl and the main cast, but is still referred to as Mop Girl, revealed to be a half-elf half-human, and becomes Elfo's love interest. In part 5, after Zøg and then Bean relinquish their thrones to Rulo, he in-turn relinquishes it to Mop Girl, who despite revealing her real name to be Miri, is declared Queen Mop Girl Miri of Dreamland, with Elfo serving as her King Consort. In the final scene of the series, Mop Girl has Elfo have the drawbridge of Dreamland Castle finally raised, which disappears with them to another dimension.

=== Freckles ===
Freckles (voiced by DiMaggio) is a sentient ventriloquist dummy given life by Dagmar for Zøg, who is the pair's second child, though Bean and Zøg do not learn of his relation to them until part 5.

=== Satan ===
Satan J. Satan Jr. (voiced by Rich Fulcher) is the depressed king of Hell and Luci's father, who accidentally marries Dagmar in part 4 as part of paying off a debt (having meant to marry Bean), who makes him miserable.

In part 5, it is revealed that Lucy is Satan’s son. At the end of the series in part 5, he effectively gives Lucy, Moira, and Bean immortality by crossing out their 3 names from the book of the dead. Also at the series finale, he imprisons Dagmar in a cage hanging on a cliff next to the Dreamland Castle.

=== Mora ===
Mora the Mermaid (voiced by Meredith Hagner) is a mermaid rescued by Bean and Elfo for the freak show in "Freak Out!" She grows close to Bean, and the two eventually begin a relationship that Bean thinks was all a hallucination after it happened. At the end of Part 4, after Bean is thrown into the ocean by Dagmar, Bean and Mora share a passionate kiss. In part 5, Bean and Mora go on a series of adventures before being Bad Bean tricks Bean into killing Mora. Mora is saved by a wish from Luci and live in serenity with Bean.

=== Bad Bean ===
"Bad Bean" (voiced by Jacobson) is the aspect of Bean's mind who agrees with Dagmar's plans as told to her as a child, who in part 3, takes over Bean's body from within her dreams after tricking Bean into killing her inside a dream (before Luci provides Bean a new body by bringing her out of the dream world through the mirror), where Bad Bean brings her mother and Satan back to Dreamland.

== Secondary characters ==
=== Introduced in Part 1 ===
- Pendergast (voiced by André) was the head knight of Dreamland. Pendergast appears in both seasons of the show and is one of the first Dreamlanders to be turned to stone by Dagmar at the end of part one, but is mistaken by Luci for a statue. Pendergast is portrayed as a wimpy knight who tries to be manly. In part three, Pendergast is tasked with guarding King Zøg by Odval and the Arch Druidess to make sure his bullet wound does not heal, and to kill him if it does, but Pendergast reveals that he looks up to Zøg like a father and betrays his employers to help Zøg escape the castle in a coffin. However, he is killed by the Arch Druidess and beheaded, which further worsens Zøg's condition as he slowly goes insane. He was later revived when the magic from the Crystal Cavern began to seep into Dreamland's water supply, and Sorcerio poured some of this magic-infused water into the jar that held Pendergast's head. While it is never explicitly explained as to how he regained his body after he was brought back as a living head, it is implied to have been due to the magic, causing his body to regrow.
- Kissandra "Kissy" the Elf (voiced by Jeny Batten) is one of Elfo's fellow elves. She has been in some sort of relationship with most of the men in Elfwood, including Elfo, right before he leaves the elf city. In season two, Kissy moves to Dreamland where the elves have set up their own miniature town "Elf Alley" with the rest of the magical creatures. There, Kissy begins a relationship with Luci, despite Elfo's warning that Kissy is only using him. Kissy breaks up with Luci and all the other men she was dating at the time in that same episode. Kissy is the daughter of Elf King Rulo.
- Tess (voiced by Batten) is a one-eyed giantess who appears in the part one episode "Love's Tender Rampage". While high, Elfo claims that he actually has a girlfriend who lives in a faraway land, is very tall, and has one eye, though he is obviously lying and his friends know it. The knights go on a crusade to bring back his so-called girlfriend, and return with an actual giantess, who is very annoyed with Elfo's charades. He promises to find Tess a replacement eye for the one she lost if she attends a royal ball with him, and she agrees. Elfo uses the castle's crystal ball to replace Tess' eye, however the eye allows Tess to "see the truth in everything." In part two, Tess returns to the castle to give the crystal ball back to Elfo.
- Miss Moonpence (voiced by Batten) is Odval's servant. She appears in a few part two episodes and is only ever shown as an eye and a hand through the walls in Odval's chambers. It is revealed that she is a talking pig in the last episode of the show.
- Turbish (voiced by Fulcher) was a knight who serves under Pendergast before he (Pendergast) died . Turbish often spends time with fellow knight of the realm Mertz, and they are referred to as Turbish and Mertz. Turbish is portrayed as a fat, incapable knight.
- Mertz (voiced by Billy West) is Turbish's fellow knight. He is slender and wimpy, and is often seen with Turbish. He too is incompetent.
- Vip and Vap are King Zøg's unvoiced cape bearers who appear in both seasons. They are both very small people, and sail away in a tin can after Zøg insults them for the very last time during the period in which the entire kingdom is turned to stone. However, they return. Their catchphrase is an annoyed sigh. In season two, it is revealed that they previously had a brother named Voop who was killed in Steamland and stuffed. Despite Zøg's mistreatment of them, they are still loyal to him as they worked to free him from the insane asylum in part 4.
- Sagatha the Fairy (voiced by MacNeille) is an old lady with wings who grants wishes for money. She is often used in the drinking game "Drink the Fairy". She almost marries Bonnie Prince Derek in "Beanie Get Your Gun" but the wedding is prevented by the Arch Druidess and the two break up.
- Arch Druidess (voiced by Tress MacNeille) is the former church minister who worked with Odval to overthrow Dreamland in season one. In season three, she is revealed to have been sent by Alva Gunderson to spy on Bean and get her to marry him so he can have all the magic in Dreamland.
- The Herald (voiced by David Herman) is the kingdom announcer who annoys almost everyone in the kingdom with his annoying shouting.
- Jerry (voiced by Herman) is Cloyd, Rebecca, and Dagmar's younger brother. Prior to the beginning of the show, his siblings attempted to screw the crown with nails on it to his head, which left him permanently brain damaged. Jerry is killed by Dagmar for trying to help Bean, and then goes to Heaven, where God takes a liking to him. In part 4, God sends Jerry back down to Earth into his original body from when he was alive. In part 5, on being killed again by Bad Bean's headless body, sick of God's lack of caring, Jerry impulsively kills the deity with a brick by breaking his lightbulb, before screwing on a replacement lightbulb with Luci to bring him back in the series finale.
- Prince Guysbert (voiced by Herman) is the oldest son of the king and queen of Bentwood. He is set to marry Bean, but at their wedding Bean begins to dislike him, seeing him as idiotic, and throws their ring onto the ground. When Guysbert reaches to retrieve it, he is impaled by a decorative sword. Later, after being thrown out with the compost, Zøg decides to test the Eternity Pendant on him. He is revived, but his brain falls out and he dies again.
- Superviso is the supervising elf of Elfwood, and the royal adviser to King Rulo.
- Big Jo is a "creepy" exorcist who tries to kill Luci, but instead his arm is cut off and he falls into a volcano. Later in the season he returns trying to get the Eternity Pendant, but is buried alive when Bean and Elfo flood the Lost City of Cremorrah with sand. In season two, Big Jo returns to Dreamland—still living—and asks Bean for forgiveness, but he is secretly plotting with Odval. In season 4 he is kidnapped and sent to an insane asylum after Zøg escapes.
- Bunty (voiced by Lucy Montgomery) is Bean's handmaiden. She is married to Stan the Executioner. Bunty occasionally talks about an upcoming revolution.
- Cloyd (voiced by Rich Fulcher) is Becky, Dagmar, and Jerry's brother as well as Zøg's brother-in-law and Bean's uncle. He appears in a recurring role in part one while he watches over Bean through his and Becky's magical green fire to make sure she is being sufficiently corrupted by Luci with Becky and occasionally Jerry. Cloyd also appears minimally in part two. He is featured in a prominent role in only the first episode, "The Disenchantress", where he welcomes his niece Bean to her homeland of Maru. He is seemingly blown up with Becky in the end of the episode by Bean, though Dagmar survives the explosion. In season four he is revealed to have survived and taken over Dreamland with Becky and turned many of the citizens into demons. Both he and Becky turn themselves into puppets. In part 5, both he and Becky are incinerated by Bad Bean in a fire pit, with Dagmar's approval. Cloyd expresses skepticism over the purposes of him and Becky turning themselves into puppets as his last words.
- The Enchantress (voiced by Montgomery), or "Rebecca" or "Becky," is Dagmar, Cloyd, and Jerry's sister, and Bean's aunt. She watches over the fire with Cloyd to make sure Bean is being corrupted by Luci, and she is seemingly killed by Bean is "The Disenchantress". In part 4 she is revealed to still be alive and takes over Dreamland with Cloyd and turned many citizens into demons. She and Cloyd later work with Freckles to infiltrate Dreamland by turning themselves into puppets. In part 5, both she and Cloyd are incinerated by Bad Bean in the fire place of the Dreamland Castle, with Dagmar's approval.
- Sorcerio (voiced by Billy West) is the idiot castle wizard who works to perfect the Elixir of life for Zøg. Sorcerio is also Odval's lover. In part 4, he animates Freckles. In part 5/series finale, he and Odval marry.
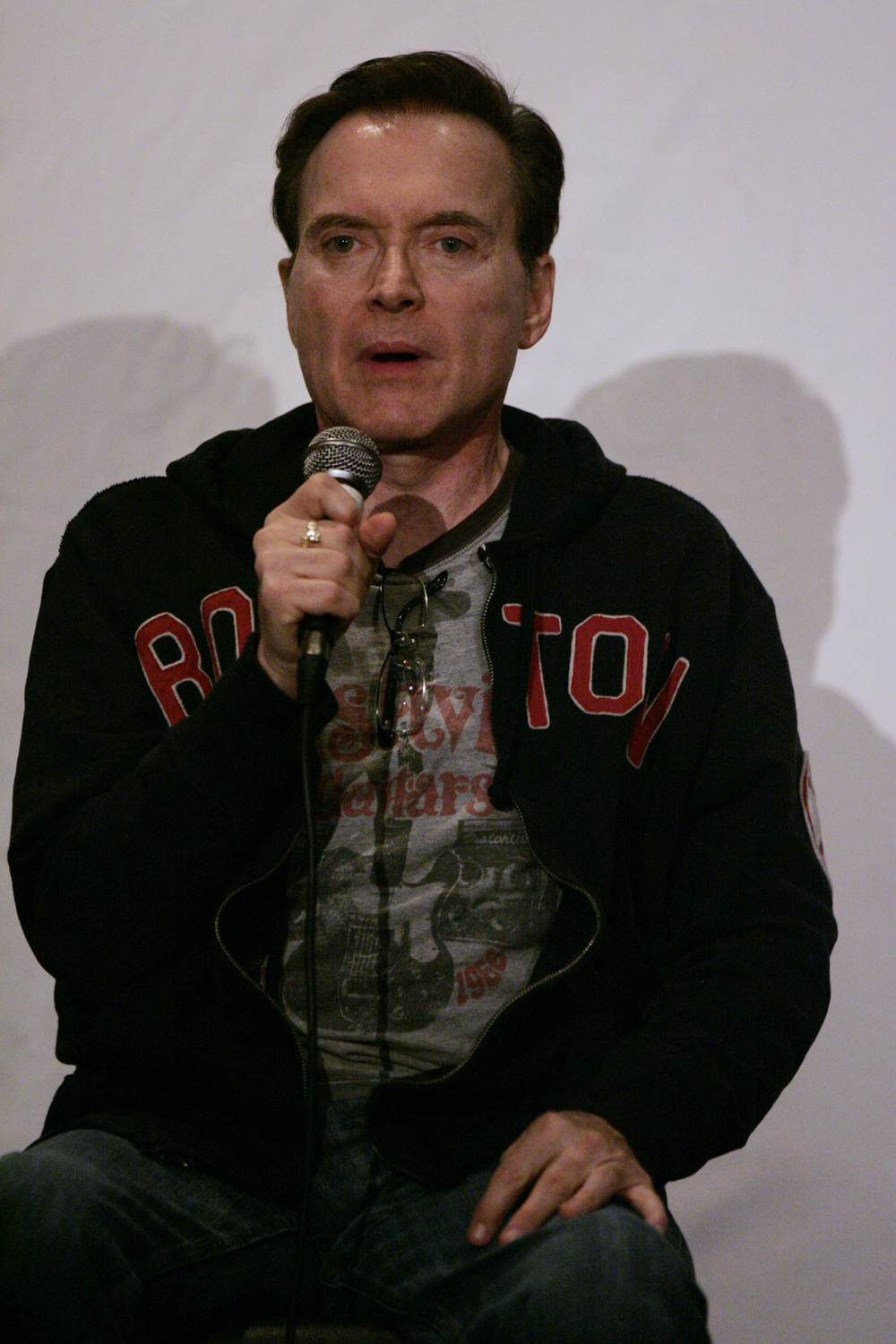
  Billy West voices various characters, including Sorcerio, The Jester, Mertz, Pops the Elf, and King Rulo.
- The Jester (voiced by West) is the kingdom jester whose catchphrase is "Oh No!" when he is thrown from windows or dropped through trapdoors by Zøg, who is always displeased by his performances.
- Pops the Elf (voiced by West) is Elfo's father who hints at him only being a half-elf. In part two, he almost dies but is saved by Elfo, who travels to ogre territory to retrieve a legendary Legenberry, which can cure Pops' illness. In part 4, Pops reconciles with his ex wife.
- King Rulo (voiced by West) is the leader of the elves even when they move from Elfwood to Elf Alley. He is very wary of humans after they attack his kingdom twice. In part 3, King Rulo and Leavo discover that their ancestors were the former rulers of Dreamland. In part 4, King Rulo and the trogs made peace. Also in part 4, King Rulo devises a plan to take over Dreamland.
- Stan the Executioner (voiced by Noel Fielding) is the cheerful executioner of the kingdom. After Zøg kicks Bean out of the castle for an episode, Stan and Bunty (his wife), take her in and he offers her a job as his apprentice.
- Merkimer's Body is the body of Merkimer that now houses a pig's intelligence. In "Hey, Pig Spender", it is revealed that Merkimer's body gained intelligence during its time on the run.

=== Introduced in Part 2 ===
- Ursula (voiced by Batten) is a selkie who can choose to either take the form of a brown bear or a female human. Ursula is very uncivilized, and meets Zøg when he goes out on a hunt in the season one episode "The Lonely Heart is a Hunter". Zøg and Ursula fall madly in love, but Ursula longs to roam the forest again, even after Zøg asks her to marry him, though they had only known each other for a few days at that point. When Ursula tells Zøg that she has chosen to return to the forest, he steals her bear skin so she cannot transform into a bear and will stay, but when he sees how sad he has made her, he gives the skin back and watches as Ursula bounds off into the woods happily. In part 4, it was discovered that Ursula has a son named Jasper and Zøg is the biological father of him. Ursula was a well-received character.
- God (voiced by Phil LaMarr), as well as the demon Asmodeus, appear in the part two episode "Stairway to Hell". God later appears in "Bean Falls Down" as he welcomes Luci to Heaven. In "Darkness Falls", God is murdered by Jerry on a whim in Heaven, sick of his lack of empathy and action taken for the state of the world. In "Goodbye Bean", Luci and Jerry revive God by screwing on one of his replacement lightbulbs.
- Leavo (voiced by LaMarche) is the first elf to leave Dreamland. He appears in season one, where he has become a pirate, and retires to Elf Alley in Dreamland with Oona taking over his job. In the end of part three, he and King Rulo are able to find the lost city of the elves under Dreamland in the Catacombs. In part 4, it is revealed after drinking the Trog's goo that Leavo is a Trog himself. Also in part 4, Leavo assists the elfs (and later the trogs when the trogs and elfs form an alliance) to capture Dreamland.

=== Introduced in Part 3 ===
- Trixy (voiced by Lauren Tom) is a Trøg who begins a short-lived romantic relationship with Elfo in part three.
- Alva Gunderson (voiced by Richard Ayoade) is the owner of Gunderson Steamworks and the brother of Skybert Gunderson. He pretends to be a worker named Gordy to grow close to Bean, but really wants to marry her so as to take the magic in Dreamland for himself. At the end of part 3, it's revealed that Alva is spying on Bean. In part 4, Alva provides Bean with his blimp after he was confronted by her for being in cahoots with the Devil. In part 5, he uses the trogs to fly to another planet. At the very end of the series it shows his fate as dying from a lack of oxygen on the moon.
- P.T. McGee (voiced by Lamarche) is the evil owner of the freak show in which Elfo is kept in "Freak Out!" for a short time in part 3. In part 4, he manages to obtain Freckles, Jasper, and Derek. In part 5, all his captured attraction slaves escape from the help of Bean and King Zog.

== Minor characters ==
=== Introduced in Part 1 ===
- Chazzzzz (voiced by Herman) is a Dankmirian weirdo who appears in the episodes "Castle Party Massacre" and "Tiabeanie Falls", as well as making cameo appearances in other episodes. In the fourth episode of the series, Chazzzzz tends to Zøg until he is revealed not to be an employee of the spa Zøg is attending. In "Tiabeanie Falls", Chazzzzz testifies against Bean in her trial, which is rigged by Odval (who wants to overthrow the kingdom and take control of it himself), and he reveals that his name is spelled with five z's. "I've done enough court reporting to know how to spell Chazzzzz," one character said. This was a reference to the Futurama episode "Where No Fan Has Gone Before" when an alien entity named Melllvar asks George Takei to sign a poster, and Melllvar tells him that his name is spelled with three l's. In season two, Chazzzzz drives King Zøg to the Twinkletown Insane Asylum, where he also works.
- The Potato Thieves are a group of criminals who heist potatoes. They trap Bean, Elfo, and Luci in the castle's crypt after stealing all of Bean's ancestors' valuables.
- Sven is a viking who attempts to take over the castle when Zøg is away for medical treatment in the season one episode "Castle Party Massacre". He and his accomplices are eventually tricked into drinking disgusting water that makes them sick, thinking it is the Elixir of Life, and is pushed out a hole in the castle floor and fall into the ocean.
- Hansel and Gretel are a pair of twins who appear in season one of the show. They cursed Gwen the Witch after she tried to take them captive, and then developed a liking for human flesh and became cannibals. Bean accidentally kills them after they try to eat her too in "Faster, Princess! Kill! Kill!". In part 2, Hansel and Gretel are revealed to have gone to hell. In part 4, Hansel and Gretel appear at Bean's wedding. Hansel and Gretel try to escape from hell with the elevator that leads to it but they are confronted by Bean and their escape plan is foiled when she cuts the elevator cable while they were still in the elevator.
- Gwen is a witch who originally took Hansel and Gretel captive, and was later cursed by them. She turns out to actually be a nice person, and, after her candy house is destroyed by Bean, she is able to downsize to a "Candy Condo" with her sister, and she later helps Bean on her quest for the Eternity Pendant.
- Porky is the exorcist Big Jo's sidekick.
- Malfus is a wizard who became immortal and lives in the Devil's Snowcone alone with a laughing horse.

=== Introduced in Part 2 ===
- Wade Brody Jr., also known as Handsome Brody, is an adventurer who claims to have gone on many amazing adventures, and came back alive with great stories of adventures. He volunteers to collect the Legenberries from the ogre kingdom to help the elves, but halfway through the mission he is revealed to be a cowardly boat salesman who made up all the stories. He is killed by the ogres in that same episodes.
- Grifto is a circus elf who notices that Zøg is taxing the elves in Dreamland too much. He and his troupe put on a show for Zøg and Derek while he, Bean, and his crew, heist the money, but betray Bean, tie them up, reveal themselves as trolls, and take off with the money. They pass through Luci's bar, now renamed from The Flying Scepter to Luci's Inferno, where Luci switches the real money with the chocolate money he has taken from the elves who want to drink at his bar, just as Zøg decides that he's been taxing the elves too heavily.
- Slimy is an octopus-like friend of Derek who tries to protect him in "Love's Slimy Embrace". Derek is eventually rescued from Slimy by Bean and Elfo.
- Skybert Gunderson (voiced by Phil LaMarr) is a pilot from the steampunk city Steamland. He arrives in Dreamland to kill Zøg, a phenomenon Bean is not aware of when she befriends Skybert and follows him back to his homeland. In the end, Bean pushes Skybert out of a plane after he shoots at her with the gun Bean accidentally shot Zøg with. In season 4, he is seen in Hell at Bean's wedding to the Devil.

=== Introduced in Part 4 ===
- Giggles is a psychotic inmate at the Twinkletown Insane Asylum, and Zøg's cellmate. He always seems to be awake, and tries to kill Zøg by trapping him in a small tunnel. When Chazzzzz tries to recapture Zøg, Giggles is somehow allowed to come with him.
