= A Piece of Work =

A Piece of Work may refer to:

- Joan Rivers: A Piece of Work, documentary about Joan Rivers
- A Piece of Work (podcast), podcast by Abbi Jacobson
- Piece of work, phrase by William Shakespeare

== See also ==
- Piece work
- Peace Work
- Workpiece
