= A Princess, an Elf, and a Demon Walk Into a Bar =

- Disenchantment episode
- Episode no.: Season 1 Episode 1
- Directed by: Dwayne Carey-Hill
- Written by: Matt Groening and Josh Weinstein
- Production code: 1DNT01
- Original release date: August 17, 2018

Episode chronology
← Previous —	Next → "For Whom the Pig Oinks"

"Chapter I: A Princess, an Elf, and a Demon Walk Into a Bar", also known simply as "A Princess, an Elf, and a Demon Walk Into a Bar",is the series premiere episode of Netflix's original streaming television series Disenchantment. The episode was directed by Dwayne Carey-Hill and written by Matt Groening and Josh Weinstein. It was released on Netflix on August 17, 2018, along with the rest of the series.

The production code is 1DNT01, and the episode stars Abbi Jacobson, Eric André, and Nat Faxon as the title characters, Princess Bean, puny elf Elfo, and demon Luci.

== Plot ==
On the morning of Princess Bean's wedding day, she escapes to a bar to play cards with the other attendants. She takes the money, then escapes the bar as the others try to rob her. Upon exiting the building, she is stopped by Odval, the advisor of King Zøg, Bean's father. Odval takes her back to the castle for handmaiden Bunty to get her ready for her "big day." The procession from Bentwood, a neighboring kingdom, arrives, and introduces Guysbert, the eldest child of King Lorenzo I and Queen Bunny, whom Bean is set to wed. Zøg and Queen Oona of Dreamland, Bean's hometown and the setting of the show, are there to greet Guysbert's parents. Meanwhile, in Elfwood, the land of the elves, Elfo is not happy with his boring job at a pre-packaged candy assortment assembly line, and wishes for something more. When King Rulo declares that Elfo cannot date his girlfriend Kissy anymore, he leaves Elfwood, an act that has only ever been done by legendary elf Leavo before. Elfo adventures through the forest and eventually comes to Dreamland.

Back in the castle, Bean finds a strange gift among the pile of wedding presents. In it is Luci, a "personal demon," as he calls himself. Bean tries to get rid of Luci, but finally accepts him when he promises to help her get out of her wedding. Elsewhere, two mysterious figures watch Bean as she meets Luci. While wandering the castle playing pranks on Zøg, Bean runs into Oona, her step-mother who married Zøg for a political alliance much like Bean is about to do with Guysbert. The two talk until the wedding commences. Elfo meets two humble farmers who give him food and drink on his way to the castle. Bean turns Guysbert down, and, subsequently, he ends up impaled on a decorative throne of swords. Lorenzo I and Bunny converse with Zøg and Oona and eventually they decide to have Bean wed Guysbert's younger brother, Merkimer. Elfo arrives just in time to help Bean escape, and the two (along with Luci) enter the Enchanted Forest. Zøg sends Sir Pendergast, Turbish, and Mertz to go and find Bean and Elfo. Meanwhile, Bean, Elfo and Luci are instructed by a fairy to go visit the Wishmaster, a being who lives up on top of a mountain who can grant wishes to those who seek him. When the trio arrive at the top of the mountain, though, they realize that he is actually the Washmaster, who washes people's clothes, and that Merkimer and the Dreamland knights are headed their way.

== Production ==
The episode, along with all other ten episodes in part one, was released on Netflix on August 17, 2018.

== Reception ==
Sam Machkovech of Ars Technica praised the episode: "This first episode does a solid job of mining a new scene for humor, then discarding it and moving on instead of beating a joke to death. (Instead, it quite literally sends jokes to the dungeon.) This, and many of the episodes that follow, comes packed with enough sight gags, pun-filled signs, hilariously timed dialogue, and tee-hee innuendo to remind viewers of their favorite Simpsons or Futurama eras.". Writing for The A.V. Club Vikram Murthi found that the show "got off to a rocky start" and "play[ed] like an extended first act rather than a discrete episode." In his review for Den of Geek, Joe Matar thought the episode just wasn't as funny as expected but highly praised the storytelling, stating" "It tells you pretty much everything you need to know about the world and the characters to get invested in the series and even though it’s one of the season’s longest episodes, coming in at a whopping 35 minutes, it mostly stays engaging because the people behind it know how to do a solid sitcom pilot". In her review of the episode in The Edge, Abi Cutler found that "To be fair to Groening, you would expect the first episode of a new TV series to contain a lot of set-up, yet for much of this fairly lengthy 36-minute episode (the average Simpsons episode lasts 22 minutes) the action felt dreadfully slow, with very few laugh-out-loud moments."
