= A Piece of Work (podcast) =

Art podcast hosted by Abbi Jacobson

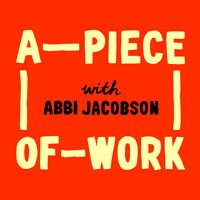

Presentation
- Hosted by: Abbi Jacobson
- Genre: Modern art
- Format: Interview
- Created by: WNYC Studios and Museum of Modern Art

Publication
- Original release: July 10 – August 9, 2017

A Piece of Work is a podcast hosted by Abbi Jacobson and produced by WNYC Studios.

== Background ==
The show is hosted by Abbi Jacobson who has an art degree from the Maryland Institute College of Art. When Jacobson moved to New York City, she started a greeting card company and would sneak her cards into the racks at the Museum of Modern Art's giftshop.

The ten-episode podcast is produced by WNYC Studios in collaboration with the Museum of Modern Art. The show debuted on July 10, 2017. Episodes were released on Mondays and Wednesdays. Each 15 minute episode contains commentary and discussion from Jacobson and a guest as they look at a piece of art in New York's Museum of Modern Art.

Each episode focuses on a specific theme or art movement. The first episode focuses on conceptualism and art by Marcel Duchamp and Jackson Pollock. Another episode focuses on minimalism and specifically on works by Jo Baer and Donald Judd. The show's website has pictures of each of the pieces discussed throughout the show.

== Reception ==
Time Out Magazine recommended the show during the COVID-19 pandemic. Nikki Lohr wrote in Podcast Review that while the show is a "bang-up success for art newbies, it offers little new information for art nerds."

Award	Date	Category	Result	Ref.
Webby Awards	2018	Podcasts: Arts & Culture	Won	
MUSE Awards	2018	Podcasts	Silver	
GLAMi Awards	2018	Exhibition and Collection Extension	Nominated	
