= Disenchantment (TV series) =

American animated fantasy sitcom

- Genre: Animated sitcom; Action comedy; Fantasy; Adventure; Satire
- Created by: Matt Groening
- Developed by: Matt Groening; Josh Weinstein
- Showrunner: Josh Weinstein
- Voices of: Abbi Jacobson; Eric André; Nat Faxon
- Composer: Mark Mothersbaugh
- Country of origin: United States
- Original language: English
- No. of seasons: 3 (5 parts)
- No. of episodes: 50 (list of episodes)

Production
- Executive producers: Matt Groening; Josh Weinstein; Claudia Katz; Eric Horsted (Note: Credited as co-executive producer.); Bill Oakley; Patric M. Verrone
- Producers: Reid Harrison (Note: Credited as supervising producer.); David X. Cohen; Deanna Maclellan; Lee Supercinski; Jeny Batten (Note: Credited as co-producer.); M. Dickson; Rich Fulcher
- Running time: 19–44 minutes
- Production company: The ULULU Company

Original release
- Network: Netflix
- Release: August 17, 2018 – September 1, 2023

Disenchantment is an American animated fantasy sitcom created by Matt Groening for Netflix. The series is Groening's first production to appear exclusively on a streaming service; he previously created The Simpsons and Futurama for Fox. The story takes place in the fictitious medieval fantasy kingdom of Dreamland, a fictionalized take on the Middle Ages. The series centers on Bean, a rebellious alcoholic princess, as well as her naïve elf companion Elfo and her destructive "personal demon" Luci. Disenchantment stars the voices of Abbi Jacobson, Eric André, Nat Faxon, John DiMaggio, Tress MacNeille, Matt Berry, David Herman, Maurice LaMarche, Lucy Montgomery, and Billy West.

Five batches of 10 episodes were released for a total of 50 episodes. The first part debuted in August 2018, the second in September 2019, the third in January 2021, the fourth in February 2022, and the fifth and final part on September 1, 2023. The series received generally positive reviews.

== Premise ==
Set in the fictional, medieval European kingdom of Dreamland, the series follows the story of the adventurous, rebellious, alcoholic princess Bean, her "personal demon" Luci, and their elf companion Elfo. Over the course of five parts, the troupe explores Dreamland and other neighboring lands and uncovers a mythical conspiracy.

== Voice cast and characters ==
- Abbi Jacobson as Bean (Parts 1–5) and Bad Bean (Parts 4–5), the teenage princess of Dreamland. Her full name is Princess Tiabeanie Mariabeanie de la Rochambeau Grunkwitz. She enjoys drinking, and she appears to reject a lot of the traditional responsibilities and qualities of a typical princess. Though she has a rebellious personality, she still has a bit of care for the people of Dreamland, her father, and her friends. Over the course of the series, she begins to become aware that she has a magical power that produces black lightning. This may be because of the magic granted to her ancestors when they made a deal to become more powerful.
- Eric André as Luci, an imp-like creature who is Bean's personal demon, and is often mistaken for a cat.
  - André also voices Pendergast, the head of King Zøg's knights
- Nat Faxon as Elfo, half-elf from Elfwood. He is optimistic and likes anchovies.
- John DiMaggio as King Zøg, Bean's father and the ruler of Dreamland of the Royal House of Grunkwitz.
- Tress MacNeille as Queen Oona, King Zøg's second and former wife and Bean's stepmother. She is a humanoid amphibian creature from Dankmire who married into the family as part of an alliance between the kingdoms.
  - MacNeille also voices Prince Derek, Zøg's and Oona's 14-year-old hybrid son, and Bean's half-brother.
- Matt Berry as Prince Merkimer, from the kingdom of Bentwood, who is arranged to marry Bean, but was turned into a talking pig.
- Maurice LaMarche as Odval, the three-eyed prime minister of Dreamland.
- Sharon Horgan as Queen Dagmar (Parts 2–5; guest Part 1), Bean's mother and first wife of King Zøg. It is revealed that she was an evil sorceress and tyrant who wanted to force Bean to complete her family's debt to the Underworld and finish her destiny, but Bean resisted in doing so.
- Lauren Tom as Mop Girl/Miri (Parts 4–5; recurring Parts 1–3), a girl often seen cleaning the castle with a mop. In Part 4, she becomes Elfo's love interest, and it is revealed that she is half-human, half-elf.
- Rich Fulcher as Satan J. Satan Jr. (Part 5; recurring Parts 3–4), the depressed king of Hell and Luci's father, who accidentally marries Dagmar, who makes him miserable.
- Meredith Hagner as Mora the Mermaid (Part 5; recurring Parts 3–4), a mermaid rescued by Bean and Elfo from a Steamland freak show who becomes Bean's love interest.

== Episodes ==
Part	Season	Episodes	Originally released
1	1	10	August 17, 2018
2	1	10	September 20, 2019
3	2	10	January 15, 2021
4	2	10	February 9, 2022
5	3	10	September 1, 2023

== Production ==
Promotional poster for the first part of the series

=== Development ===
The series, created by The Simpsons and Futurama creator Matt Groening, was said to "bear his trademark animation style". The series is animated by Rough Draft Studios, the same studio that worked on Futurama. The series was announced in July 2017, with a 20-episode order, along with multiple members of the cast, at which time it had been in the works at Netflix for at least one year. Following the series premiere, in October 2018, Netflix announced that an additional 20 episodes had been ordered for a total of four batches of 10 episodes.

In September 2022, Groening and his fellow creators confirmed at D23 panel that new episodes of Disenchantment were being produced. In January 2023, showrunner Josh Weinstein stated on Twitter that a fifth part was currently in post-production. In April 2023, Weinstein stated that they were sound mixing the episodes. On August 1, 2023, Netflix confirmed that Disenchantment would conclude with the release of the fifth and final 10-episode part, released on September 1, 2023.

=== Writing ===
In July 2017, it was announced that rapper Briggs was part of the writing team for the series. John DiMaggio has described the series as "the offspring of The Simpsons and Game of Thrones." Groening has said the show has a "definite feminist point of view." Series showrunner Josh Weinstein said that one of the best parts of writing was building "that gradual unfolding of mysteries, but also the deepening of them. I think season three is the deepening of all the mythology, the questions and the characters." Weinstein also noted that part three of the series was the "middle" and that if Netflix were to renew the series for an additional two-part, 20-episode season beyond the second one, the fourth through sixth parts would be the series' ending. In another interview, Weinstein said that Harry Potter and the works of Ray Bradbury and Philip K. Dick served as inspiration to some of the series' more fantastical elements.

=== Casting ===
The main characters' actors, Abbi Jacobson, Nat Faxon, and Eric André, were cast in their roles of Princess Bean, Elfo, and Luci in July 2017, when the series was announced. In addition to the main characters' roles, the other starring voice actors were revealed, including John DiMaggio as King Zøg, Tress MacNeille as Queen Oona and Prince Derek, and Matt Berry as Prince Merkimer. Multiple members of the cast have worked together on other projects created by Matt Groening, including DiMaggio, MacNeille, Billy West, Maurice LaMarche, and David Herman, who all voiced main roles in the futuristic science fiction television series Futurama. In July 2018, prior to the series' premiere, the characters voiced by the main members of the cast were revealed.

=== Tie-ins ===
The episode "Dreamland Falls" ties into Groening's other series Futurama, implying that both shows do in fact take place in the same universe. When Luci uses the crystal ball to show moments from before, Philip J. Fry, Bender and Professor Farnsworth can briefly be seen in a time machine. The moment is a reference to the episode "The Late Philip J. Fry" in which the trio travel in a one-way time machine and witness the end and rebirth of the universe, implying that the three were passing through after time restarted. In the episodes "Electric Princess," "Steamland Confidential," and "Last Splash," among others, Futurama is referenced multiple times. For instance, a boulevard is named after Farnsworth, there is an homage on one of the buildings to Planet Express, and various locations within the steampunk city of Steamland reference the show, along with various voice actors from Futurama joining the cast of Disenchantment. In return, Futurama acknowledges continuity in the season 8 episode "I Know What You Did Next Xmas" in which Professor Farnsworth travels solo in the same time machine again, this time adding the option to go backwards in time. After he goes back too far, he witnesses the rebirth then the end of the universe and Bean, Elfo and Luci can be seen briefly in the castle. Others have noted that in the episode "Steamland Confidential," the series references the "steamed hams" made by Principal Skinner for Superintendent Chalmers in the April 1996 episode of The Simpsons, titled "22 Short Films About Springfield".

In 2026, a crossover episode of Futurama aired entitled "A New New York Yankee in King Elfo's Court", where Fry uses Professor Farnsworth's time machine to accidentally travel back to medieval times and ends up in Dreamland.

== Release ==
In May 2018, a release date of August 17, 2018, was announced for the first batch of 10 episodes. In May 2019, a release date of September 20, 2019, was announced for the second batch. After multiple delays from a late 2020 release date, the third part's premiere was finally confirmed for January 15, 2021. The fourth part was released on February 9, 2022.

=== Marketing ===
On May 22, 2018, Groening released three teaser images on Reddit. The next day, the premiere date was revealed along with several more images. Before part 2 was released, Groening created a new comic book company, Bapper Books, which released a San Diego Comic-Con exclusive book, Disenchantment: Untold Tales.

== Reception ==
On review aggregator Rotten Tomatoes, 62% of 89 critic reviews are positive for part 1, which has an average rating of 6.13/10. The critical consensus reads: "Disenchantment showcases enough of Matt Groening's trademark humor to satisfy fans—although the show's overall familiarity and disappointing willingness to play it safe may not bode well for future seasons." According to Metacritic, which calculated an average of 56 out of 100 based on 28 reviews, part 1 received "mixed or average reviews". Forbes called the series "charming, unique, and excellent." Ars Technica stated the series starts rocky, but then it gets "bloody good". Entertainment Weekly gave the series a "C" grade, likening it to an extended "Treehouse of Horror" story. Den of Geek gave a more mixed reception of the series, praising the concept, but criticizing some of the jokes. Brian Tallerico from RogerEbert.com wrote the series does not live up to the standards of other Netflix Original animations, but praised its concept and cast, and suggested the series might improve in the future. Reviewing seven of the first season's 10 episodes, Danette Chavez of The A.V. Club gave the series a B−, saying that the strength of the cast made up for weak writing. Upon its initial review, TV Guide gave the series a lukewarm reception. But upon viewing of the last three episodes, the opinion changed, and praised the serialization of the series that paid off in the end. Similarly, Rhuaridh Marr of Metro Weekly called the show disenchanting while saying that it is "as much a treat to look at as it is to listen to" with environments which are "lush and vibrant." At the same time, Ben Travers on IndieWire said the series starts out "rough" but moves into more effective serialized storytelling toward the end of Part 1. Melanie McFarland of Salon.com compared the series to The Simpsons and Futurama, saying the series professes to be feminist, noting that Bean is the embodiment of this, resisting her father's attempts to push her into arranged marriages for political reasons.

For the second part, Rotten Tomatoes collected 15 reviews and identified 73% as positive, with an average rating of 6.6/10. The critical consensus reads: "As Disenchantment's pieces slowly fall into place, it grows deeper in character and world building to become a more fully realized show – if only those pieces would fall just a little bit faster." Kevin Yeoman of Screen Rant described it as a "considerable step forward in terms of storytelling, plotting, [and] character development" and an impressive improvement from Part 1. Joyce Slaton of Common Sense Media, reviewing parts 1 and 2, disliked the cartoon violence, rude jokes, and frequent alcoholism, but praised Bean as a "strong, non-stereotypical character," the non-problematic sexual content, and the beautiful animation, while noting that the language is mild. Slaton also claimed that the humor was "disappointing."

For the third part, Rotten Tomatoes collected 5 reviews and identified 60% as positive. Vikram Murthi of The A.V. Club was critical of part 3, complaining that he was not satisfied with the episodes of the season, while Neal Justin of the Star Tribune pessimistically told readers to "enjoy it while you can." Tony La Vella of Gamerant had a similar view, arguing that the series "feels unfocused", while admitting that the show is "slowly laying the pipework to what could ... be a satisfying conclusion." Marcel Schmid, in a German-language publication, described the series as a "lovingly designed series" with nice set design, beautiful background painting, effectively mixes "the Middle Ages with industrialization", engaging in social commentary, and has effective black comedy. Schmid also argued that the series had improved over time and stated that Steamland "offers a good contrast to medieval Dreamland." Additionally, Caitlin Kennedy of Nightmarish Conjurings positively reviewed the series, noting that while in Parts 1 and 2, it has been "immature in the most fun way possible", Part 3 went further, showing "the most growth and more comfortably dabbles in heavier topics in its unfolding epic narrative", and praises the expansion of the story, especially into places like Steamland, the "steampunk and technologically advanced counterpart to Dreamland." Kennedy also argued that Part 3 focused on love, loss, and mental health, while saying she is looking forward to more episodes.

== Other media ==
It was announced at San Diego Comic-Con 2026 that the series would have a crossover with Futurama in the eleventh season of that series, in an episode entitled "A New New York Yankee in King Elfo's Court".
