= Princess Bean =

Fictional character from Disenchantment

Queen Bean
- Disenchantment character
- Bean (center) along with Luci (left) and Elfo (right)
- First appearance: "A Princess, an Elf, and a Demon Walk Into a Bar" (2018)
- Last appearance: "A New New York Yankee in King Elfo's Court" (Futurama; 2026)
- Created by: Matt Groening; Josh Weinstein
- Voiced by: Abbi Jacobson

In-universe information
- Full name: Tiabeanie Mariabeanie de la Rochambeau Grunkowitz
- Nicknames: Bean; Beanie
- Species: Human
- Gender: Female
- Title(s): Princess; Queen (abdicated)
- Family: King Zøg (father); Queen Dagmar (mother); Queen Oona (stepmother); Derek (half-brother); Jasper (half-brother); Freckles (half-brother); Cloyd and Becky (maternal uncle and aunt); Jerry (maternal uncle); Mariabeanie (maternal great-grandmother); Bee-Baw (paternal grandmother); Xøg (paternal grandfather); Yøg (paternal uncle); Former monarchs of Maru (maternal ancestors); Former monarchs of Dreamland (paternal ancestors)
- Spouse: Mora
- Nationality: Dreamlander, Maruvian

Tiabeanie Mariabeanie de la Rochambeau Grunkwitz, also known as Princess Bean, and later Queen Bean, is the main character of the adult animated fantasy television series Disenchantment, voiced by Abbi Jacobson. Bean is the daughter of King Zøg and Queen Dagmar of Dreamland, where she was born, and is the step daughter of Zøg's second wife, Oona. She often refers to herself as "Drunkowitz" when drunk. Bean has a bad relationship with both her parents. She has a romantic relationship with the mermaid Mora.

== Characterization ==
Bean is a princess who enjoys getting drunk and into trouble, much to the chagrin of her father and everyone else in the kingdom. Bean yearns to be a normal person, so she can do whatever she wants without getting in trouble with King Zøg, and date other people without them being scared of Zøg's wrath. Jacobson was cast as Bean in late July 2018.

== Fictional biography ==
=== Childhood ===
15 years prior to the start of the series, Tiabeanie was born to King Zøg of Dreamland and Queen Dagmar of Maru. She had a very close relationship with her grandmother, Bee-Baw, who read her stories in bed. 4 years later, Bean parents were preparing for a toast to the family until Dagmar unknowingly drank from Zøg’s poisoned cup and turned to stone.

Growing up, Bean never knew the true manner of her mother’s death since King Zøg had always told her she died naturally. Both father and daughter did not initially know that Dagmar drank from the cup she herself poisoned for Zøg so she could take Bean to Maru to complete a dark prophecy, her sole reason for producing an heir. Dagmar never truly loved Bean.

Dreamland was at war with the kingdom of Dankmire, whose people were forced by Dreamland to build a canal. The war ended after King Zøg agreed to marry the princess of Dankmire, Oona. Oona then gave birth to a human-Dankmirian hybrid son, Derek. Bean grew jealous and resentful of her half-brother because, as the sole male heir in a patriarchal kingdom, he is given opportunities and privileges that she is denied of. Hence, Bean’s rebellious streak and destructive, alcoholic tendencies are formed and her relationship with her family is strained.

=== Main series ===
Bean, now 19, is getting ready for her arranged marriage to Prince Guysbert of Bentwood for political and economic reasons, when she finds a mysterious gift in the present pile. When she opens it out of curiosity, she finds Luci, her own "personal demon," as he says. When the time comes for Bean to be wed to a handsome but stupid prince from Bentwood, she accidentally kills her groom. The parent of the groom, Prince Guysbert, decide that Bean can still wed their second son, Merkimer. When the two are about to get married, Elfo, who has run away from his homeland of Elfwood, interrupts the wedding. When Bean, Elfo, and Luci, avoid marrying Guysbert's brother, they begin to go on many adventures, that have to do with the myths of Hansel and Gretel, throwing a giant party in the castle that is overthrown by Vikings, and a giantess named Tess who the Dreamland knights capture.

Soon, Bean's father, King Zøg takes an interest in finding the Elixir of Life, and sends the knights (who take Bean and Luci) with them to find the elixir and Elfo, who was previously captured by Big Jo the exorcist. Bean rescues Elfo and the trio return to Elfwood after learning that Elfo is only half-elf, where they try to make peace with the elves until the knights arrive and attack the elves to get their blood to activate the Eternity Life, which is one half of the elixir. Elfo tries to protect the elves, but is killed by himself from the future. When given a choice to resurrect her mother, Dagmar, or Elfo, Bean chooses Dagmar, much to the chagrin of Elfo, back in Hell. When people around the kingdom begin turning to stone, Dagmar takes Bean on a boat back to her true homeland Maru. Little does Bean know that it was actually Dagmar turning everyone to stone, not Queen Oona, as King Zøg and the others has suspected.

Part 2 begins with Bean aboard her mother Dagmar's ship. Upon arriving to her birthplace Maru, she quickly realizes that something suspicious is going on, and runs away when Dagmar and her aunt and uncle Becky and Cloyd try to nail a crown to her head. Bean finds Luci and a stairway down to Hell to rescue Elfo, who died in the previous part. When Bean, Luci, and Elfo, emerge from Hell via a volcano and realize they are on Mermaid Island, where the mermaids are very hospitable, until the trio leave and the mermaids reveal that the only reason that they were keeping Elfo's body intact was that they were going to eat him. Upon returning to Dreamland, King Zøg begins throwing rocks at them aimed to kill, because he mistakenly believes that Bean was working with Dagmar to turn all the other Dreamlanders to stone. Bean begins to have suspicions about the castle and about a strange music box apparently was given to her as a child by Dagmar, and that keeps reappearing on her mantle whoever she disposes of it.

After Bean travels to the land of the orcs to find a mystical cure for the elves who have all gotten sick and stops a troupe of trolls masquerading as circus elves from stealing Dreamland's gold, she travels to Steamland, a neighboring kingdom to Dreamland, constructed of technology, where Bean acquires a gun, with which she accidentally shoots King Zøg, her father. Bean's brother Derek becomes the de facto King and accuses Bean of murder, guided by the corrupt Odval. Just as Bean is about to be burned at the stake with Elfo and Luci for the murder, they fall through into the catacombs, where they are met by Dagmar once again.

Part 3 reveals Bean to be bisexual. In the episode "Last Splash", she falls in love with the mermaid Mora. Mora is also helpful in getting Bean to Steamland. This is consistent with the previous season, where Bean was shown to enjoy "the company of mermaids." Additionally, Bean's voice actress, Abbi Jacobson, is bisexual. In the season, Dagmar attempts to reason with Bean, hoping to repair their relationship, but Bean sees through her lies and reveals that Dagmar only wants Bean's magic, so they escape back to Dreamland, where they are welcomed with open arms by King Derek. Zøg has delved into a deeper condition. After Derek and Sagatha's wedding is crashed by the Arch Druidess, who escapes the Dreamland, she follows the woman with Elfo, as Luci stays behind to entertain Zøg. Bean finds temporary work at Gunderson Steamworks, where she meets a young boy who turns out to be Alva Gunderson himself, who offers Bean a marriage proposal, though Bean runs away and rescues Elfo from a freak show, knowing that he only wants her hand in marriage due to the magic she possesses.

On her way back to Dreamland, Bean and Elfo ride a boat with a mermaid named Mora, who Bean begins an intimate relationship with. However, in the morning, Mora is gone, leading Bean to believe that experience was only a dream, though a necklace Mora gave Bean that washes up on the shore behind her as she walks the rest of the way to Dreamland confirms the last night. Later, Bean comes into contact with the king and queen of Bentwood, but it kingdom has been taken by Merkimer's body, inhabited by a pig. They escape, to see Zøg's worsened condition. Bean becomes queen, but when ogres attack, Elfo sacrifices himself and Luci is killed. Bean is found by Dagmar again, who takes her down a secret elevator in a tower in the castle of Dreamland, and takes her to a lava filled wedding aisle to marry an unknown man.

In Part 4, Dagmar attempts to marry her off what is revealed to be the Devil himself. During the ceremony, Bean cuts open Dagmar's palm and placed it on the paper, thus marrying off Dagmar to the Devil instead. Bean then meets up with Luci and Jerry who escape Hell together. They take the elevator directly to Alva's office in Steamland. Alva gives them his airship to go back to Dreamland while they also retrieve Elfo. Once they get there, it is revealed that Maru annexed the kingdom. They're able to regain control of the Kingdom. Subsequently, Bean and Zøg agree to rule together. As the part progresses, she learns new things about Dreamland's history while having nightmares that were eventually revealed to be caused by an evil version of herself known as "Bad Bean". Bean tries to confront the doppelgänger but always ends being killed by the latter in her dream-like state. Eventually, she stops trying to kill Bad Bean and walks with her throughout her mindscape reaching a reality were Dreamland is destroyed. Once there, Bean learns that her double is planning to destroy Dreamland by inhabiting her real body while she stays trapped in the Dreamscape. Bean however is freed by Elfo and Luci and successfully kills the evil version of herself but then has to face Dagmar whom was called by Bad Bean earlier. Bean tries to trick Dagmar by looking like Bad Bean but the latter sees through the ruse and throws her into the ocean while also taking over Dreamland. As she falls deeper into the ocean, Bean reunites with Mora, sharing a passionate kiss.

== Reception ==
Vulture noted that "Jacobson's scratchy ruefulness is a perfect match for Bean's mix of anti-establishment attitude and indifference" and Drop the Spotlight said that "Jacobson does a good job of humanizing the character during moments when Bean has to make important decisions." Mashable described Bean as "uneducated" and "crude."

On the feminism of the series, Melanie McFarland of Salon.com compared the series to The Simpsons and Futurama, saying the series professes to be feminist, noting that Bean is the embodiment of this, resisting her father's attempts to push her into arranged marriages for political reasons. She also argued that the series doesn't stereotype any ethnic group by having all the characters be painted generically, with Dreamland as a "non-racial patriarchy," with Bean standing up to "charmless men who stand in her way." Even so, McFarland wrote that people should be wary of the feminist framing of the show, arguing that Apu Nahasapeemapetilon in The Simpsons embodied racial stereotypes, and said that "the show's creators can't say that the show is feminist until at least 50 percent of the writers are women."
