= Abbi Jacobson =

American comedian and actress (born 1984)

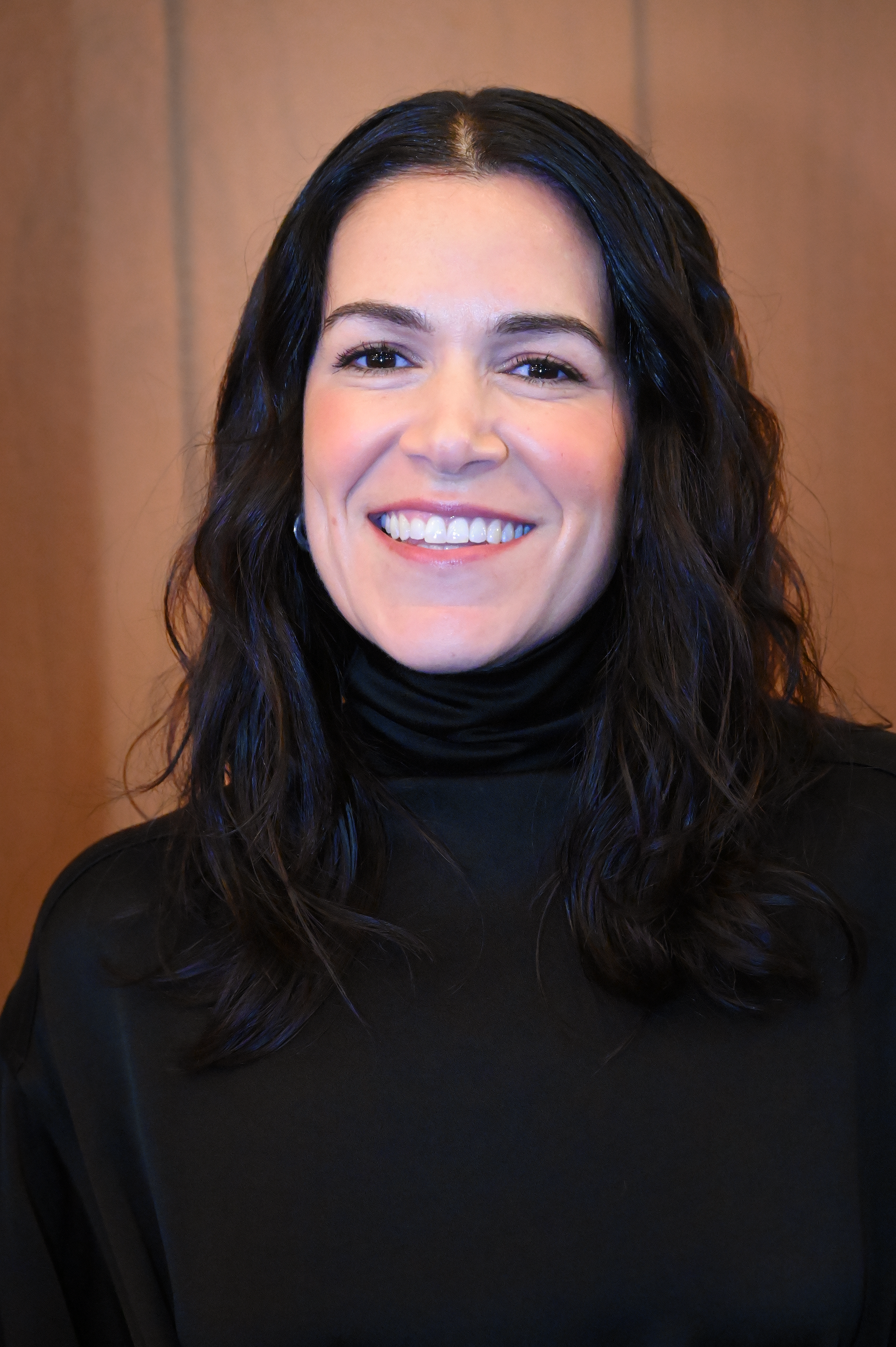
- Jacobson in 2025
- Born: 1984 (age 41–42); Wayne, Pennsylvania, U.S.
- Education: Maryland Institute College of Art (BFA); Emerson College
- Occupations: Comedian; actress; writer; illustrator
- Years active: 2009–present
- Spouse: Jodi Balfour (m. 2023)

Abbi Jacobson (born 1984) is an American comedian, actress, writer, producer, and illustrator. She co-created and co-starred in the Comedy Central series Broad City (2014–2019) with Ilana Glazer, based on the web series of the same name. She is a writer and co-creator of the Amazon Prime series A League of Their Own (2022), in which she also stars as Carson Shaw, a baseball player in the All-American Girls Professional Baseball League. Her other roles include voicing Katie Mitchell in The Mitchells vs. the Machines (2021), Nya in The Lego Ninjago Movie (2017), and Princess Bean in the series Disenchantment (2018–2023), in addition to appearing in the live-action films Person to Person (2017) and 6 Balloons (2018).

Jacobson founded production company Tender Pictures in 2020, and co-founded fellowship program Prelude alongside Mieka Tennant. She has published two colouring books of her own illustrations, and published a book of personal essays, I Might Regret This: Essays, Drawings, Vulnerabilities and Other Stuff (2018).

== Early life ==
Abbi Jacobson was born in 1984 in Wayne, Pennsylvania. She is the daughter of Susan Komm, an artist, and Alan Jacobson, a graphic designer. She is Jewish, attended Hebrew school and had a Bat Mitzvah. She was raised in Wayne, Pennsylvania, where she attended Valley Forge Middle School and Conestoga High School. She also participated in Birthright Israel, a free ten-day trip to Israel for young Jewish adults between the ages of 18 and 26.

She studied fine arts and video production at the Maryland Institute College of Art (MICA), graduating in 2006 with a B.F.A. in General Fine Arts. While at MICA, she studied stand-up comedy for one year with poet Jeremy Sigler, having transferred for a term to study acting at Emerson College.

Jacobson moved to New York City after graduating from MICA. She began taking classes with the Atlantic Theater Company and the Upright Citizens Brigade Theatre, where she met Ilana Glazer.

== Career ==
=== Broad City ===
From 2009 to 2011, Jacobson and Glazer wrote and performed in a web series titled Broad City, which focused on their lives in New York. The series was nominated for an ECNY Award for Best Web Series. It was well received by critics and developed a cult following. At the Upright Citizens Brigade, Jacobson and Glazer adapted the series into a live show that they performed in called Broad City Live.

In 2011, cable network FX, working with Amy Poehler as the producer, purchased a script commitment for the series from Glazer and Jacobson. However, the network did not approve the script and decided not to proceed with development. Glazer and Jacobson then approached Comedy Central, who agreed to purchase the script from FX and order a pilot.

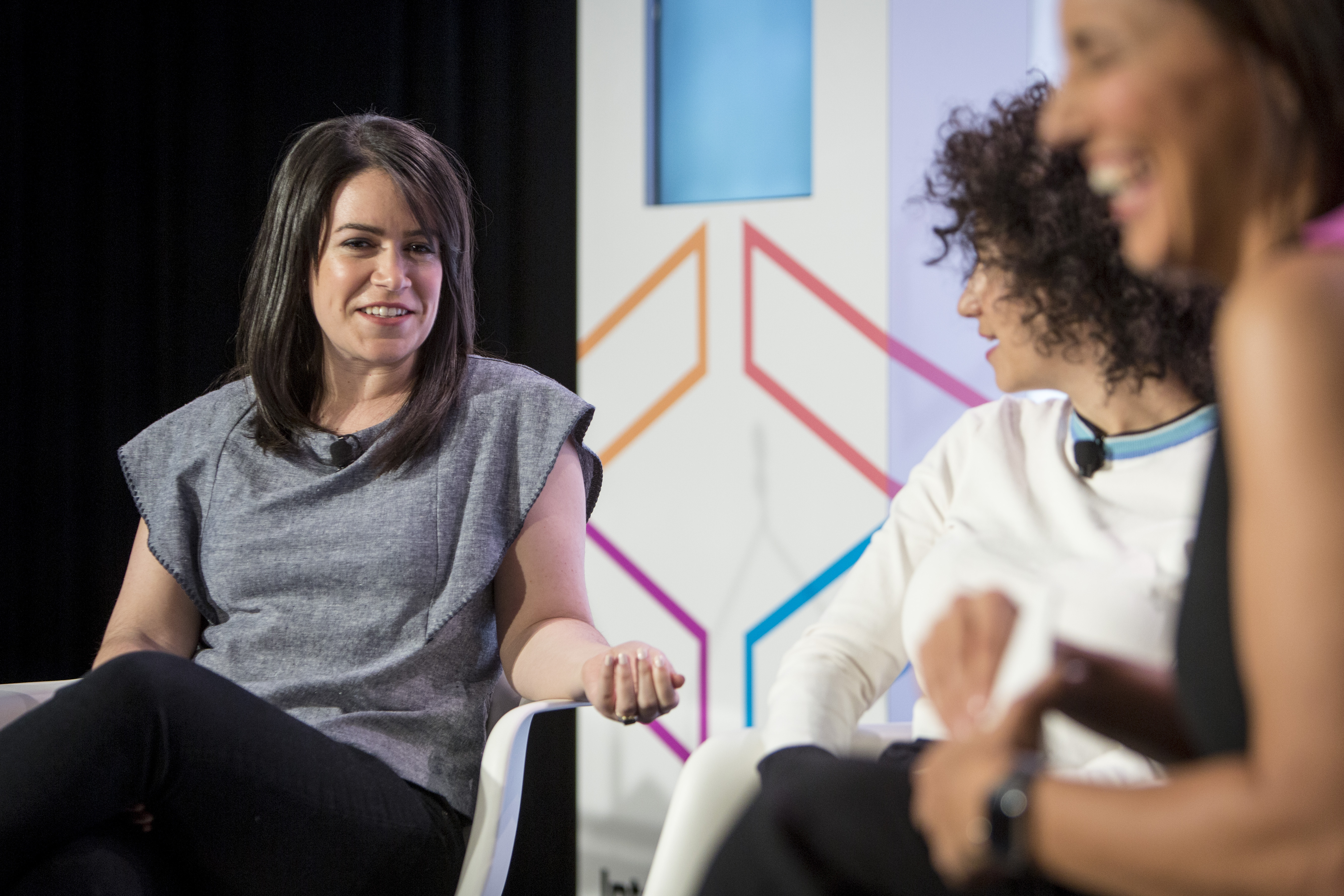
Jacobson and Glazer at Internet Week in 2015

Broad City made its broadcast television premiere in January 2014 and was received with positive reviews and strong ratings, becoming Comedy Central's highest-rated first season since 2012 among the younger demographics, including adults 18–34, with an average of 1.2 million viewers.

Materializing following backlash of Lena Dunham's Girls, which was critiqued for its lack of racial diversity and upper-middle-class characterization, Broad City is often discussed for its approach and depictions to themes gender, sexuality, and identity. The series portrays semi-biographical characters, millennial, assimilated Ashkenazi Jewish New Yorkers. The intersection between Jewishness, queerness, femininity, masculinity, and adulthood is central to the narrative of the show and the lives of characters; Ilana has relationships with both men and women, and in the final season, Abbi comes out as queer.

In February 2014, Comedy Central renewed the show for a second season. In January 2015, the series was then renewed for a third season, which premiered on February 17, 2016. In January 2016, the series was renewed for a fourth and a fifth and final season.

==== Reception and impact ====
The show has received critical acclaim from fans and critics alike. Season one of the show received a 96% rating from Rotten Tomatoes, based on reviews from 23 critics, with the site's consensus stating, "From its talented producers to its clever writing and superb leads, Broad City boasts an uncommonly fine pedigree." Review aggregation website Metacritic noted season 1 received "generally favorable reviews", giving it a score of 75 out of 100, based on reviews from 14 critics. The A.V. Club named Broad City the second best TV show of 2014 for its first season. Season two received positive reviews, with Metacritic giving it a score of 89 out of 100, based on reviews from 8 critics. Rotten Tomatoes gave the second season a rating of 100%, based on reviews from 11 critics, with the site's consensus: "Led by two of the funniest women on TV, Broad City uses its stars' vibrant chemistry to lend an element of authenticity to the show's chaotic yet enlightening brand of comedy." Karen Valby from Entertainment Weekly described the show as a "deeply weird, weirdly sweet, and completely hilarious comedy". The Wall Street Journal referred to the show as "Sneak Attack Feminism". Critic Megan Angelo quotes Abbi Jacobson: "If you watch one of our episodes, there's not a big message, but if you watch all of them, I think, they're empowering to women." The A.V. Club critic Caroline Framke wrote that Broad City was "worth watching" despite its "well-trod premise", and that the series is "remarkably self-possessed, even in its first episode". Jacobson was a fan of bands like Phish growing up and would often spoof her jamband fandom on Broad City.

The bodily and racialized humour within the show was noted as transforming stereotypes and tropes of Jewish womanhood that have been underdocumented within feminist academia, further exploring themes of sexual desire, female agency, and freedom of choice. The show may further be interpreted as a rejection of overconsumption culture and what societal ideas of what conventional success looks like for young women through the character's constant battles with unemployment and business endeavours, showcasing a theme of "perpetual adolescence" and "failed adulthood". Broad City's origins as a web series reputedly elevated a platform and space for groups that are overlooked by traditional media programming, gaining an established online fanbase for how the series blended cultural specificity and relatability, as well as expanding the possibilities for women, making a lasting influence on feminist media and independent television for its expansion of feminist comedy theory, and for its depictions of taboo topics.

As comedians, actors, and creators, Jacobson and Glazer's work reveal the contradictions and impossible standards within postfeminist culture, especially within media creation, illustrating both on-and-off-screen how boundaries can restrict women's ability to define themselves and see themselves within comedy television.

=== Tender Pictures ===
Jacobson extended her commitment to inclusive storytelling through Tender Pictures, founded in 2020, which "centers stories of friendship, identity, and found family". In January 2025, she co-founded the Tender Pictures Fellowship Program, "Prelude", alongside Mieka Tennant, whose aim is to "level the playing field for emerging storytellers". The eight-month fellowship offers ten spots and connects its participants with over thirty established filmmakers and industry experts through mentorship, workshops, and panels. "Rooted in play and experimentation", the program partners with names such as A24 and the Criterion Collection, emphasizing "creativity before credentials and supporting economic viability for new voices in film". Jacobson shared in an interview with Deadline, "The most important thing we can give emerging storytellers is the confidence that there's a place for them in the industry and that their story is worth telling, all while providing them a toolkit to do so."

Tender Pictures is currently working on a television series adaptation of Isle McElroy's 2023 novel People Collide, which centers around a married couple swapping bodies. The book's themes explore marriage, identity, sex and raises questions about the nature of true partnership. Jacobson serves as the series writer and showrunner via Tender Pictures.

Jacobson's work with Tender Pictures has been characterized as empowering storytellers in underrepresented groups by redefining what access to the film and television industry looks like. The company aims to respond to systemic barriers in place by creating opportunities that directly combat industry exclusivity. The company website states that 91% of participants in its programs come from underrepresented groups, 79% identify as LGBTQIA+, and 73% identify as she/her or she/they.

=== Other work ===
In 2011, Jacobson wrote and performed in a solo show called Welcome to Camp, which ran in New York and Los Angeles.

In December 2015, Jacobson was cast in the film Person to Person, opposite Michael Cera and Philip Baker Hall, written and directed by Dustin Guy Defa. Jacobson also starred in The Lego Ninjago Movie, released on September 22, 2017.

Her first appearance in BoJack Horseman was in the 2016 episode "The Bojack Horseman Show", in which she voiced Emily.

In 2017, Jacobson hosted a 10-episode podcast about modern and contemporary art called A Piece of Work co-produced by The Museum of Modern Art and WNYC Studios. She plans to do a second season.

From 2018 to 2023, she voiced Princess Bean in Matt Groening's Disenchantment.

Jacobson appeared in a March 2020 episode of Curb Your Enthusiasm.

In 2021, Jacobson voiced Katie Mitchell in the Sony Pictures Animation film The Mitchells vs. the Machines.

In 2022 she served as a writer, producer, co-creator and star of the Amazon series A League of Their Own, based on the 1992 film of the same name, which tells the story of a World War II-era women's baseball team and the queer community that it fostered. The series, in which she plays catcher Carson Shaw, was critically acclaimed and had a Rotten Tomatoes score of 95%. A League of Their Own earned the GLAAD Award for Outstanding New TV Series as well as the 2023 National Visibility Award from the Human Rights Campaign, honouring LGBTQ+ leaders and entities that exemplify living openly and authentically. While initially renewed for a four-episode second season in March 2023, Amazon Studios later cancelled the series, and blamed it on the WGA and SAG-AFTRA strike the same year.

=== Books ===
In 2013, Jacobson published two coloring books with Chronicle Books: Color This Book: New York City and Color This Book: San Francisco. Jacobson also illustrated a book titled Carry This Book, published October 2016 by Viking Press. It features colorful, humorous illustrations of the imagined contents of various celebrities' bags. "I have always been intrigued by what people carry around with them. It can tell you everything" says Jacobson in the book's introduction. Well received by critics, Carry This Book was a New York Times bestseller.

Jacobson published another book, I Might Regret This: Essays, Drawings, Vulnerabilities, and Other Stuff, October 30, 2018, with Grand Central Publishing. With drawings throughout, the book of personal essays is centered around Jacobson's solo three week cross-country road trip. While it features comedic anecdotes and moments, it primarily focuses on the heartbreak Jacobson endured while getting over her first love, also her first relationship with a woman, and general issues of identity. According to Jacobson, the book is centered around self-reflection: "It's about how I've felt like an internal outsider for my entire life because I just never understood what love was, that I would never get to experience it, and being a public figure only heightened that anxiety."

== Personal life ==
In an April 2018 interview, Jacobson stated that she dates men and women but "they have to be funny, doing something they love."

She has been in a relationship with actress Jodi Balfour since October 2020. Jacobson and Balfour married in 2023.

=== Advocacy ===
In October 2023, Jacobson signed the Artists4Ceasefire open letter to Joe Biden, President of the United States, calling for a ceasefire in the Gaza war. She is also a signatory of the Film Workers for Palestine boycott pledge that was published in September 2025.

== Filmography ==
=== Film ===
Year	Title	Role	Notes
2009	Revelation 13	Danielle	
2011	Special Things to Do	Mary	Short film
2011	Upload	Elaine	Short film
2014	High and Dry	Studio Mate	Short film
2016	Neighbors 2: Sorority Rising	Jessica Baiers	
2016	The Master	Chicken (voice)	Short film
2017	Person to Person	Claire	
2017	The Lego Ninjago Movie	Nya (voice)	
2018	6 Balloons	Katie	
2021	The Mitchells vs. the Machines	Katie Mitchell (voice)	
2021	Dog Cop 7: The Final Chapter	Dog Cop/Katie (voice)	Short film
2026	Tangles	Sarah (voice)	

=== Television ===
Year	Title	Role	Notes
2010	Vag Magazine	Moon Cup	Episode: "Feminist Sweepstakes"
2010–2011	Broad City	Abbi Abrams	Web series; 15 episodes; also creator
2012	Jest Originals	Reenactment Amanda	Episode: "I Didn't Know I Was Gilbert Gottfried"
2012	Moms V. Pros		4 episodes
2013	CollegeHumor		Episode: "Jake and Amir/All-Nighter: Jake and Amir's Dream"
2013	Annie and a Side of Fries	Annie Leonard	Web series; 10 episodes; also creator
2014–2019	Broad City	Abbi Abrams	50 episodes; also creator, writer, executive producer, director Nominated – MTV Movie & TV Award for Best Comedic Performance (with Ilana Glazer) (2017)
2015	Lucas Bros. Moving Co.	Sister Sister (voice)	Episode: "Sister Sister Sister"
2015	Inside Amy Schumer	Herself	Episode: "80s Ladies"
2015	The Untitled Web Series That Morgan Evans Is Doing for MTV	Blanche	1 episode
2015–2018	Pickle and Peanut	Sneaky Patty (voice)	5 episodes
2015	Lip Sync Battle	Herself	Episode: "Ilana Glazer vs. Abbi Jacobson"
2016–2018	BoJack Horseman	Emily (voice)	7 episodes
2017	Portlandia	Burning Man Girl	2 episodes
2018	Drunk History	Gloria Steinem	Episode: "Sex"
2018	RuPaul's Drag Race	Herself (guest judge)	Episode: "Breastworld" (season 10)
2018–2023	Disenchantment	Princess Bean, Bad Bean (voice)	50 episodes
2019–2020	Crank Yankers	Cheryl (voice)	2 episodes
2020–2025	Bob's Burgers	Megan (voice)	2 episodes
2020	Curb Your Enthusiasm	Diane	Episode: "Beep Panic"
2022	A League of Their Own	Carson Shaw	8 episodes; also creator, writer, and executive producer
2024–2025	The Second Best Hospital in the Galaxy	Dr. Zypha (voice)	10 episodes
2024	Interior Chinatown	Kleen Stik Commercial (voice)	Episode: "Ad Guy"
2024	No Good Deed	Leslie Fisher	Main cast
2025–present	Long Story Short	Shira Schwooper (voice)	Main cast
2026	The Comeback	Mary Abrams	Recurring; 3 episodes
2026	Futurama	Princess Bean (voice)	Episode: "A New New York Yankee in King Elfo's Court"
