= Leela's Homeworld =

- Futurama episode
- Episode no.: Season 4 Episode 2
- Directed by: Mark Ervin
- Written by: Kristin Gore
- Production code: 4ACV02
- Original air date: February 17, 2002

Episode features
- Opening caption: It's like "Hee Haw" with lasers
- Opening cartoon: "Makin' 'Em Move" by Van Beuren Studios (1931)

Episode chronology
← Previous "Kif Gets Knocked Up a Notch"	Next → "Love and Rocket"
- Futurama season 4

"Leela's Homeworld" is the second episode in the fourth season of the American animated television series Futurama, and the 56th episode of the series overall. It originally aired on the Fox network in the United States on February 17, 2002. "Leela's Homeworld" was written by Kristin Gore and directed by Mark Ervin. The episode reveals Leela's true origin as a mutant who was abandoned by her parents so she could have a better life. Her parents fabricated her prior background as an alien, as it is illegal for mutants to live on the surface.

== Plot ==
The Professor announces some good news: Leela's old orphanarium has named her orphan of the year, and that he has invented a machine that makes glow-in-the-dark noses. The machine produces enormous amounts of toxic waste, and Hermes tells him to get rid of it. The Professor hires Bender for the job, and he dumps the waste into the sewer. At the orphanarium's award ceremony, the headmaster presents a story of Leela's arrival and Leela delivers a speech which profoundly inspires the orphans. However, back at Planet Express, Fry finds Leela in tears, and she admits she still longs to have parents, unaware that a pair of individuals each with a single eye like her are watching from underneath a sewer grate.

Bender expands his one-time dumping into a full waste management service. The sewer mutants grow angry with Bender's disposal technique and abduct him, Fry, and Leela. The mutants sentence them to be lowered into a lake of mutation-inducing chemicals (and threaten to beat up Bender afterwards). Two hooded mutants break from the group and swing the crane the three are tied to, dropping them on the far side of the mutagenic lake. The mutant mob pursue them. Fry, Leela, and Bender take refuge in a mutant home, where they find photos and news clippings of every major event in Leela's life. Leela is frozen in horror at the thought of a mutant having been stalking her her whole life, giving the mob the opportunity to capture them. However, after a whispered word from the hooded mutants, the crew's sentence is commuted to exile. They are flown by hot air balloon to a surface access ladder hanging over the lake. Fry and Bender emerge on the surface, but Leela, determined to find out what the hooded mutants know about her, dives into the chemical lake. To her surprise, she is unaffected by the chemicals. Fry heads to the orphanarium to get some clues to what is going on, and the headmaster gives him the alien-language note that was left with Leela when she was abandoned. Fry takes the note to the Professor for analysis. (Note: The note uses a substitution code that reads "Your parents love you very much")

Leela pursues the hooded mutants through the sewers back to the home with the shrine to herself. Finding that one of them has a bracelet identical to one she has had since before coming to her orphanarium, Leela hypothesizes that they killed her parents, and the hooded mutants confess. Before Leela can kill the two in her rage, Bender shoots Fry through the ceiling using his waste disposal pump. Fry stops Leela and removes the mutants' hoods, revealing they are one-eyed. Fry explains that though the Professor could not translate the note, his analysis showed that it was written on a brand of toilet paper that is used primarily in the sewers, cluing Fry in to the fact that the hooded mutants are Leela's parents. Her parents confess that, Leela having been born the least-mutated of all mutants, they wanted Leela to have a better life than that of a mutant, they left her at the orphanarium with an alienese note so she would be assumed to be an alien. A tearful reunion ensues, and the episode closes with a montage of scenes that show Leela's parents secretly watching over her throughout her life.

== Continuity ==
This episode reveals Leela's origins, something she had been searching for all throughout the series. Until this episode, Leela believed she was an alien who was abandoned on Earth after her home planet collapsed (as seen in "A Bicyclops Built for Two"). The revelation of her true origin in this episode was previously foreshadowed when Leela's parents appeared in a crowd of mutants in the season two episode "I Second That Emotion".

== Production ==
The idea for the character Leela and her back story were conceived by Matt Groening and David X. Cohen before they even pitched the series to Fox. As the plot for this episode developed, they realized that the design of the characters needed to change to look less normal. In the original design, Morris had a normal mouth and Munda had normal human arms, one of which was visible in her original appearance in "I Second That Emotion". For a while, the idea was thrown around to stay true to some aspects of this design and Munda had one normal human arm and one tentacle arm. Eventually it was decided to make both arms tentacles and work under the assumption that in the previous appearance she had been wearing something similar to a human flesh colored glove. There was a large amount of debate amongst the writers as to whether the truth of Leela's origin should be revealed to the viewer before Leela realized it or if it should be a surprise for the viewers as well. The final decision was made based on the idea that it would be easier to make jokes if the viewer were in on the plot.

The song played during the ending montage is "Baby Love Child" by Pizzicato Five; the scene was slightly extended due to a desire to include more of the song. Producers claim that the montage was inspired by the musical sequences used on Homicide: Life on the Street.

== Reception ==
Along with the episodes "Jurassic Bark" and "The Luck of the Fryrish", this episode is considered to be a fan favorite and one of the most emotional episodes of the series.

In its initial airing, the episode received a Nielsen rating of 3.4/5, placing it 71st among primetime shows for the week of February 11–17, 2002.

Zack Handlen of The A.V. Club gave the episode an A, particularly praising the execution of a story that could have been forgettable if done any other way. He also praised the episode's final sequence and its music.
