= Eternium =

Eternium may refer to:

- Eternium (album), a 2004 album by Diablo
- A fictional planet in the television series Futurama, featured in the episodes "The Day the Earth Stood Stupid" and "The Why of Fry"
