= Where No Fan Has Gone Before =

- Futurama episode
- Episode no.: Season 4 Episode 11
- Directed by: Patty Shinagawa
- Written by: David A. Goodman
- Production code: 4ACV11
- Original air date: April 21, 2002

Guest appearances
- William Shatner as himself; Leonard Nimoy as himself; Walter Koenig as himself; George Takei as himself; Nichelle Nichols as herself; Jonathan Frakes as himself

Episode features
- Opening caption: Where No Fan Has Gone Before
- Opening cartoon: Hiss and Make Up from Merrie Melodies by Warner Bros. Cartoons (1943)

Episode chronology
← Previous "The Why of Fry"	Next → "The Sting"
- Futurama season 4

"Where No Fan Has Gone Before" is the eleventh episode in the fourth season of the American animated television series Futurama, and the 65th episode of the series overall. It originally aired on the Fox network in the United States on April 21, 2002. Set in a retro-futuristic 31st century, the series follows the adventures of the employees of Planet Express, an interplanetary delivery company. In this episode, the Planet Express team and most of the main cast of Star Trek: The Original Series face a court-martial after visiting the forbidden planet Omega 3.

An existing idea to feature the cast of Star Trek: The Original Series was scrapped and replaced with a new script written by David A. Goodman, after the newly hired writer was identified as the biggest Star Trek fan on the staff. All of the main cast agreed to appear, with the exception of James Doohan, who declined. This resulted in the creation of a new character called "Welshie" (cf. Doohan's "Scottie"), who was quickly killed off. Because DeForest Kelley had died in 1999, a character with his likeness appeared without speaking.

"Where No Fan Has Gone Before" was received positively by critics, with praise directed at the various Star Trek homages. The script was nominated for a Nebula Award, losing to The Lord of the Rings: The Two Towers.

== Plot ==
Philip J. Fry learns that the Star Trek franchise has become forbidden since it became a worldwide religion in the 2200s; all of its fans were killed during the Star Trek Wars and the "sacred" tapes of every episode of the original series and its films were incinerated, with the remaining copies sent to a forbidden planet known as Omega 3. Outraged, Fry takes Leonard Nimoy's head from the Head Museum and convinces Bender and Leela to join him in a mission to recover the tapes.

On Omega 3, they find several original sets from Star Trek, and most of the original cast with new bodies and eternal youth. An energy being named Melllvar explains that he became a Trekkie after watching the discarded tapes over and over again. Melllvar gives Nimoy a body, and orders the actors and the Planet Express crew to participate in a Star Trek convention until the end of time, killing Welshie, a supporting character, to ensure their obedience. While Melllvar forces the cast to perform his fan script, Bender, Leela and Fry escape in the Planet Express Ship. Fry convinces the crew to attack Melllvar to save the actors, but Melllvar destroys the ship's engine as he drags it back to the planet.

After seeing the Planet Express crew's attempt to defeat him, Melllvar wonders if they are more worthy of his adoration than the Star Trek cast, and decides to force them to battle to the death. After several minutes of fighting, Melllvar's mother appears and makes him come home for dinner. While he is gone, the two groups combine the engine of the cast's ship with the hull of the Planet Express Ship to escape. To lose enough weight to lift off, the cast jettison their bodies. Melllvar follows the crew into space in a Klingon Bird of Prey. Zapp Brannigan boards the Planet Express Ship and holds a court-martial of the occupants for trespassing on Omega 3. Leela points out that while the court-martial is in progress, Melllvar is still chasing them. Fry convinces Melllvar that he cannot spend his life watching Star Trek, and Melllvar agrees to end the chase, allowing the crew and cast to return to Earth.

== Production ==
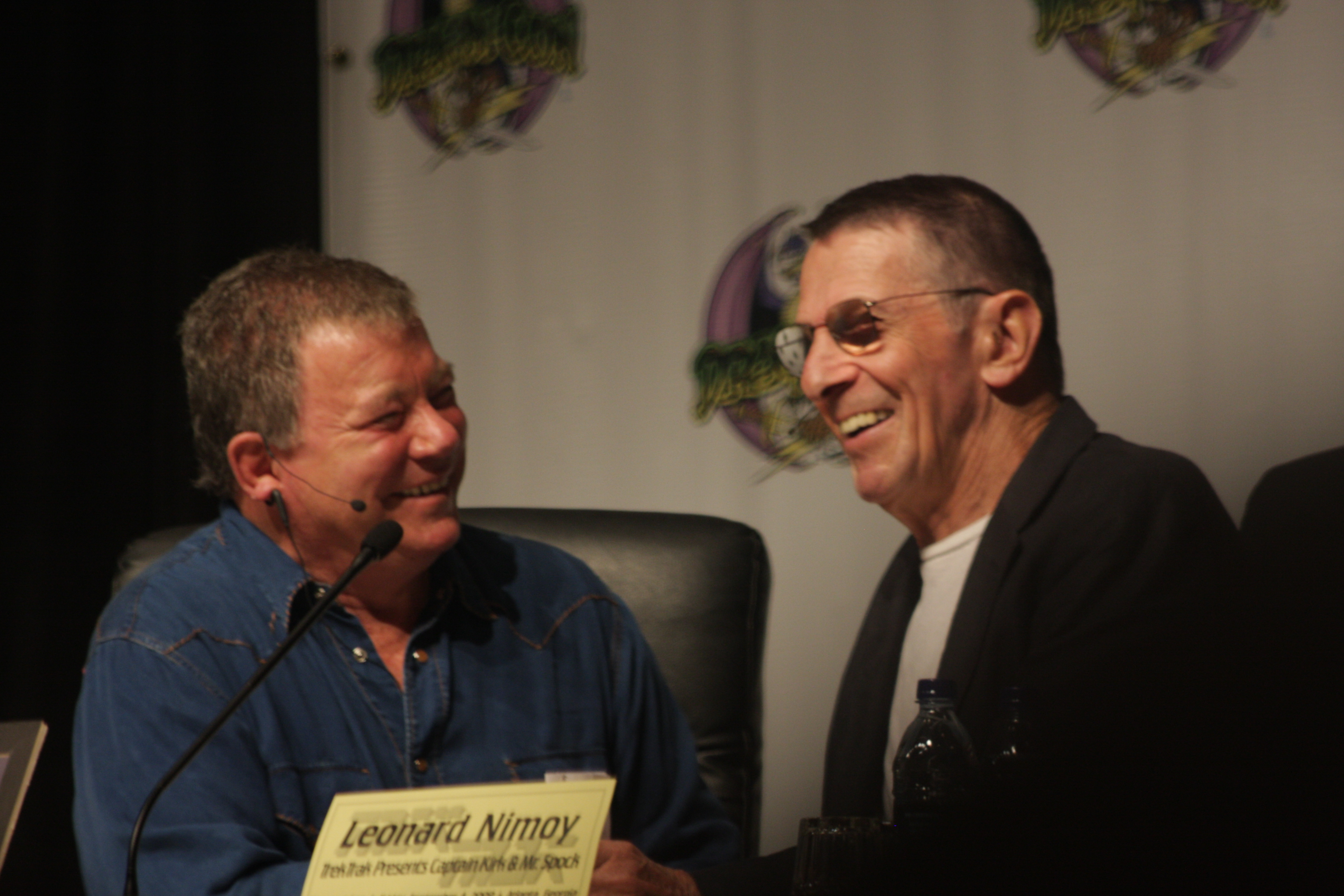
William Shatner (pictured left) and Leonard Nimoy (pictured right) recorded their voice work for this episode together.

Writer David A. Goodman said that making this episode was a "dream come true" for many members of the crew including himself. At the time he was hired onto the staff, they were already talking about creating a Star Trek-centric episode. The initial idea was to have a giant Kirk and Spock fighting over New York-New York Hotel and Casino. Executive producer David X. Cohen assigned the writing task to Goodman, as they agreed he was the biggest Trek fan of the group. They agreed to drop the story idea with the giant characters and gave him two weeks to write the script. The deadline was complicated as Goodman had to spend the first week on jury duty, and then broke his ankle. Despite this, he described "Where No Fan Has Gone Before" as the most fun he has ever had writing a script.

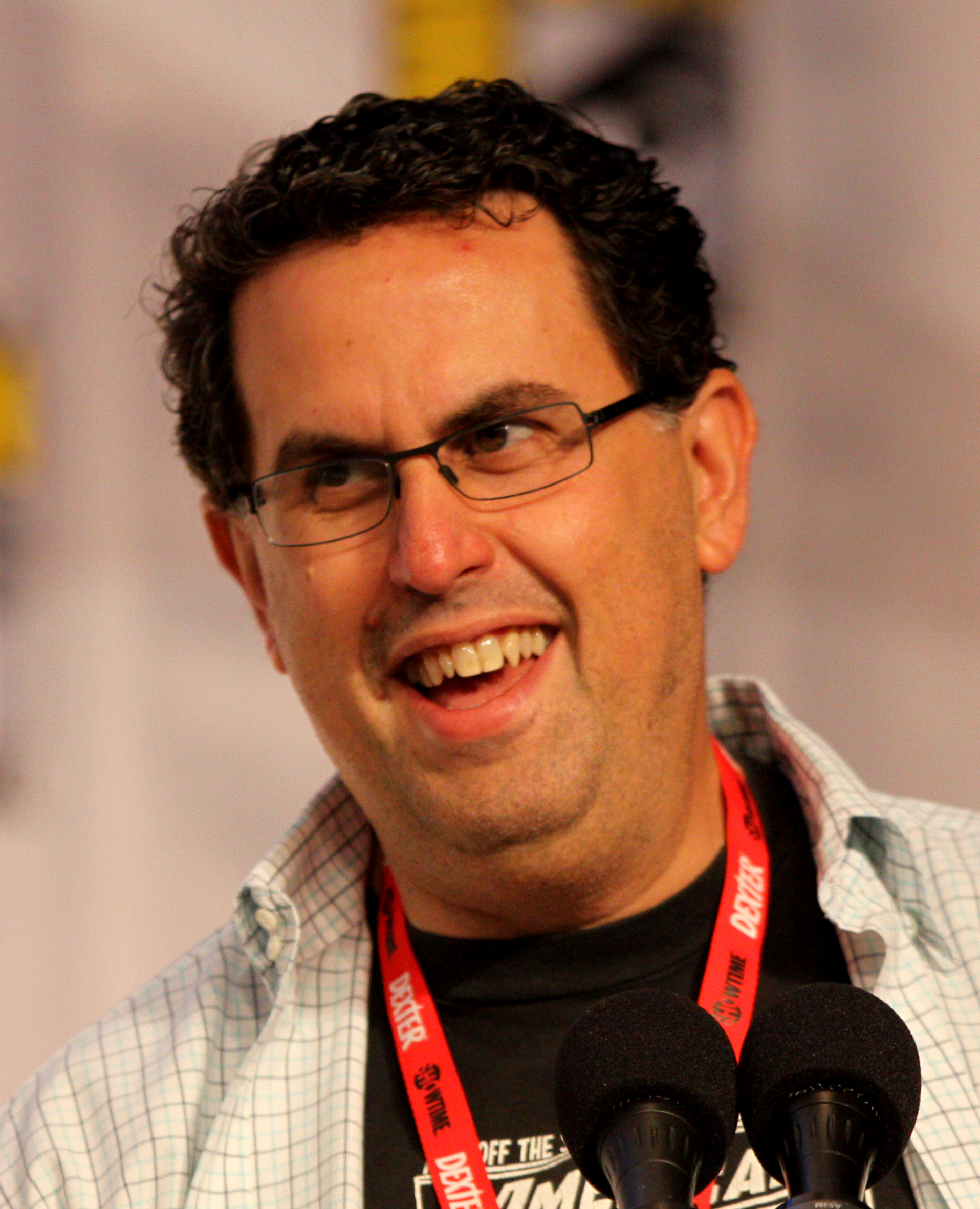
After working on Futurama, including this episode, David A. Goodman wrote for Star Trek: Enterprise.

Series creator Matt Groening stated that while he is a fan of the Star Trek franchise, he has never seen an episode of The Original Series in its entirety, but has seen Star Trek: The Motion Picture. Director Pat Shinagawa said that there was a certain amount of jealousy among the crew that she got to work on the episode. All of the living members of the original Star Trek cast agreed to appear in the episode with the exception of James Doohan, whose agent replied, "No way." Because of this, the episode's working title was jokingly named "We got everybody but Scotty" and so Scotty was replaced with "Welshie". DeForest Kelley was physically portrayed but had no lines due to his death in 1999. Shatner and Nimoy recorded their lines together, which was unusual as actors usually record solo. Goodman later joined the writing staff of Star Trek: Enterprise.

Several designs for the energy being were considered; however, the final version was decided upon due to a desire to keep the design simple. Shinagawa noted that even so, the final design for Melllvar is more sophisticated than some energy beings featured in the original series.

=== Cultural references ===
The episode contains many story elements based on episodes of Star Trek. In the DVD audio commentary, Goodman noted his pride in having included a large number of quotations from The Original Series, particularly those items which he claims "the people on the internet" had not found on their own. He noted that in "Shatner's Log", based on Star Trek's "Captain's log", the line "The impossible has happened" quotes the opening log in "Where No Man Has Gone Before".

== Broadcast and reception ==
Although not the last produced episode for season four, it was used as the season finale for the fourth broadcast season, being broadcast on April 21, 2002, on Fox in the United States. The episode was subsequently nominated for a Nebula Award for Best Script in 2004, but lost to the film The Lord of the Rings: The Two Towers (2002).

Prior to the broadcast, Dusty Saunders previewed the episode for Rocky Mountain News, calling Futurama "under-appreciated" and that this episode had "Lots of fun and fantasy at the expense of the noted sci-fi series." Zack Handlen, while writing for The A.V. Club, gave the episode an 'A' grade. He said that the storyline could have been seen as "pretty mean-spirited if there wasn't such a clear thread of Trek love running through the episode". He felt that having the framing device set during the event rather than afterwards was "delightful", and that the Star Trek references were both "relevant to the story and funny in their own right". Andy Wilson reviewed the episode for BigShinyRobot, calling it the "greatest animated homage to Trek ever" and "one of the best episodes of Futurama".

IGN ranked the episode in tenth place in their list of the top 25 episodes of the series in 2006, calling it "ultimate fan service episode", but "one that any sci-fi fan, Trekker or otherwise, can still enjoy". The popularity of this episode combined with the large volume of Star Trek references has made this episode a touchstone among Trekkies according to Chris Baker at Wired. This episode, along with "Teenage Mutant Leela's Hurdles", was the great moments of the fourth season by David Hofstede in his book 5000 Episodes and No Commercials: The Ultimate Guide to TV Shows on DVD. "Where No Fan Has Gone Before" was included in the Volume 4 release on DVD, including several deleted scenes, which was first released on August 24, 2004, in the United States.

== See also ==
- "The Squire of Gothos"
