= Three Hundred Big Boys =

- Futurama episode
- Episode no.: Season 4 Episode 16
- Directed by: Swinton O. Scott III
- Written by: Eric Kaplan
- Production code: 4ACV16
- Original air date: June 15, 2003

Guest appearance
- Roseanne Barr as herself

Episode features
- Opening caption: Voted "Best"
- Opening cartoon: "Flop Goes the Weasel" from Merrie Melodies by Warner Bros. Cartoons (1943)

Episode chronology
← Previous "The Farnsworth Parabox"	Next → "Spanish Fry"
- Futurama season 4

"Three Hundred Big Boys" is the sixteenth episode in the fourth season of the American animated television series Futurama, and the 70th episode of the series overall. It originally aired on the Fox network in the United States on June 15, 2003. Set in a retro-futuristic 31st century, the series follows the adventures of the employees of Planet Express, an interplanetary delivery company.

In this episode, Earth president Richard Nixon issues every citizen with a $300 tax rebate; with the episode following the Planet Express crew as they each spend their money. The episode was inspired by "22 Short Films About Springfield", an episode of The Simpsons.

== Plot ==
Zapp Brannigan leads an attack on Tarantulon VI, claiming numerous silken artworks for Earth. Earth President Richard Nixon considers this a windfall, and gives every citizen a $300 tax rebate. Brannigan later invites Leela and her friends to an exhibit of the silk treasures.

The Planet Express crew each contemplate how to spend their funds. Leela uses it to swim with a whale; Fry uses the money to buy and drink one hundred cups of coffee, and Bender spends his on burglary tools to steal a $10,000 cigar, but refuses to smoke it until the exhibition. Others find their expenditures less thrilling: Professor Farnsworth uses the money to buy stem cells to give him a youthful appearance but discovers they only last temporarily, while Hermes buys a set of mechanical stilts for his son Dwight that inadvertently go haywire and drag the two off, rampaging through New New York. Kif buys a watch for his girlfriend Amy but accidentally loses it to the same whale that Leela was swimming with, though he eventually recovers it after a brief accusation of ambergris theft. The watch is now broken, but Kif manages to smuggle some ambergris out and promises to make it into a perfume for Amy.

Eventually, they all gather for the exhibition. Just as Bender lights up the cigar, Hermes and Dwight, still stuck on the stilts, smash through the side of the building, causing the cigar to ignite the silk artworks. At the same time, Fry finishes the hundredth cup of coffee and enters a caffeine-induced state of hyperspeed, moving much faster than anyone else. Fry easily gathers all the guests onto a trolley, wheels them into an alley behind the museum, extinguishes the fire and flees into the night. As the guests recover, they find that Zoidberg, who had been debating on how to spend his tax rebate on something that would make him happy, opted to spend it on a nice meal for a number of hobos. The guests join them for the meal, though Bender is soon caught by the cops and beaten up for the earlier robbery.

== Broadcast and reception ==
In its initial airing, the episode received a Nielsen rating of 3.6/7, placing it 79th among primetime shows for the week of June 9–15, 2003. The episode received an A− rating from The A.V. Club.
