= A Taste of Freedom =

- Futurama episode
- Episode no.: Season 4 Episode 5
- Directed by: James Purdum
- Written by: Eric Horsted
- Production code: 4ACV05
- Original air date: December 22, 2002

Guest appearances
- Phil Hendrie as Old Man Waterfall and Frida Waterfall

Episode features
- Opening caption: Or Is It?
- Opening cartoon: "The Queen Was in the Parlor" from Merrie Melodies by Warner Bros. Cartoons (1932)

Episode chronology
← Previous "Less Than Hero"	Next → "Bender Should Not Be Allowed on TV"
- Futurama season 4

"A Taste of Freedom" is the fifth episode in the fourth season of the American animated television series Futurama, and the 59th episode of the series overall. It first aired on Fox in the United States on December 22, 2002 and also aired on Sky One in early 2003. This episode was directed by James Purdum and written by Eric Horsted. The plot centers on Zoidberg's experience with the concept of freedom on Earth.

== Plot ==
The crew celebrates Freedom Day, a day where one can do anything they want, regardless of the consequences. Dr. Zoidberg seems passionate about the holiday, as he loves the idea of freedom, something he did not have on his home planet Decapod 10. At the big Freedom Day celebration in Washington, D.C., Earth President Richard Nixon's head unveils the Earth flag, the "Old Freebie", to celebrate the spirit of the holiday but the flag is eaten by Zoidberg. Zoidberg feels this is an expression of his freedom on Freedom Day; however, the rest of the crowd sees him as a traitor. Zoidberg is chased around town and takes cover in his planet's embassy.

Zoidberg is put on trial and the crew hires lawyer Old Man Waterfall to represent him. Zoidberg is found guilty and sentenced to death when he refuses to apologize publicly. After Earth's army storms the Decapodian embassy to seize Zoidberg, the Decapodian ambassador to Earth summons the Decapodian military to retaliate. The Decapodian army easily defeats Earth's defense forces and Earth is enslaved by the crustacean extraterrestrials.

Later, Fry, Leela, Bender, Zapp Brannigan, and Kif, deciding the time has come to fight back, steal a heat-seeking missile from a museum exhibit and launch it toward the Decopodians’ newly constructed Mobile Oppression Palace. However, the palace is "cold-blooded", like the Decapodians themselves, and the palace continues its destructive rampage. It eventually crushes Old Man Waterfall for standing in its way, whom Zoidberg respected for defending him when no one else would. Zoidberg then lights a flag on fire. This shocks and angers the other citizens, but Zoidberg explains that he does so in order to preserve the freedom that the flag represents and throws it toward the Mobile Oppression Palace, attracting the missile and thus destroying the palace. Zoidberg is declared a hero and is honored by Nixon at a ceremony, where he unveils a new Earth flag, out of which Zoidberg is allowed to take a bite. Zoidberg concludes that Earth, not Decapod 10, is now his true home planet.

== Reception ==
The A.V. Club's Zack Handlen gave the episode a B+, saying: "There’s a fundamental shallowness to “A Taste Of Freedom” which is at once useful for the comedy (because delving into the issues never distracts from the jokes), and disappointing in the story. The episode takes the most predictable stance on its premise—eating the flag is not something you should be arrested for—and then doesn’t offer much variation outside of a series of escalating incidents. That makes for a diverting half hour that occasionally stabs at legitimate criticism, but one that’s ultimately more forgettable than its various absurdities would suggest."

== See also ==
- Flag of Earth
