= Bend Her =

- Futurama episode
- Episode no.: Season 4 Episode 13
- Directed by: James Purdum
- Written by: Michael Rowe
- Production code: 4ACV13
- Original air date: July 20, 2003

Episode features
- Opening caption: Too Hot for Radio!
- Opening cartoon: Herman and Katnip in "Naughty But Mice" by Famous Studios (1947)

Episode chronology
← Previous "The Sting"	Next → "Obsoletely Fabulous"
- Futurama season 4

"Bend Her" is the thirteenth episode in the fourth season of the American animated television series Futurama, and the 67th episode of the series overall. It originally aired on the Fox network in the United States on July 20, 2003. In the episode, Bender changes into a female robot and adopts the name Coilette.

== Plot ==
While attending the Earth 3004 Olympic Games with the crew to see Hermes compete in the limbo event, Bender feels he should compete as well. However, feeling emasculated by the large male Olympic bending robots, he decides to pose as a fembot in order to compete. Competing as Coilette, he easily beats the female competitors, winning five gold medals. However, the medalists are called in for gender testing prior to the awards ceremony. Desperate, Bender has Professor Farnsworth give him sex reassignment surgery, turning him into an authentic fembot.

Coilette is invited to go on a late night talk show. Also appearing on the show is robot actor Calculon, who falls for Coilette instantly. The two start dating, which Coilette confides to the crew she is doing for the fame and valuable gifts Calculon sends her. Calculon proposes to Coilette. She accepts, scheming to get half his money with a divorce settlement.

However, moved by Calculon's deep professions of love, Coilette finds that though she does not want to be his wife, she also does not want to hurt him with a divorce, and even openly weeps while telling the crew this. Professor Farnsworth concludes that Coilette's new emotionalism is due to her new female hormones taking over. Leela offers to help Coilette out under the condition that she reverse her sex change. She reasons that though there is no way for Coilette to get out of her predicament without hurting Calculon, a soap opera parting will hurt him least. At the wedding, Coilette, Leela, Zoidberg and Fry stage an elaborate scene that fakes Coilette's death. As promised, Bender returns to his male persona, and claims not to have been changed at all by the experience. However, under his breath he bids Calculon an emotional goodbye.

== Production ==
The opening scene at the Olympics was changed following the September 11 attacks. Several brief shots of various country representatives, including countries related to the terrorist attacks, were removed because the writing team did not want viewers to think that the episode was referencing the attacks. Similar minor changes were made to some other episodes in season four.

This episode was considered somewhat easier to animate than others because there were fewer spaceship scenes.

== Reception ==
In a review from 2015, Zack Handlen from The A.V. Club stated "I don't like the idea of trying to reduce art, no matter how vulgar or clumsy, to something we have to set against a checklist of appropriate viewpoints", also going on to criticize the episode for "gags that all seem to be based on tediously dated notions", for "basic assumptions about how men and women behave that are neither interesting nor particularly insightful", and for "no unexpected spin that throws everything into question". Handlen cited the last bit of the episode as "one of the only times the episode feels legitimately clever and funny".

== Cultural references ==
- The title of the episode is a reference to the 1959 film Ben-Hur. It is also a reference to Bender's name and the act of gender bending. In the DVD audio commentary, producer David X. Cohen claims the episode title is a "triple joke".
