= Spanish Fry =

- Futurama episode
- Episode no.: Season 4 Episode 17
- Directed by: Peter Avanzino
- Written by: Ron Weiner
- Production code: 4ACV17
- Original air date: July 13, 2003

Episode features
- Opening caption: [In Alienese (1)] Thanks for watching, Futurama slave army!
- Opening cartoon: "Much Ado About Mutton" by Famous Studios (1947)

Episode chronology
| ← Previous "Three Hundred Big Boys" | Next → "The Devil's Hands Are Idle Playthings" |
- Futurama season 4

"Spanish Fry" is the seventeenth episode in the fourth season of the American animated television series Futurama, and the 71st episode of the series overall. It originally aired on the Fox network in the United States on July 13, 2003. Set in a retro-futuristic 31st century, the series follows the adventures of the employees of Planet Express, an interplanetary delivery company. In this episode, Fry's nose has mysteriously disappeared so he seeks to get it back. David X. Cohen admitted that this episode is one of the most "filthy" in the series' history.

== Plot ==
While camping in the woods on a company outing, Fry is abducted by aliens as he searches for Bigfoot. He wakes up the next morning to find that his nose has been stolen from his face. Fry learns that human noses are regarded by aliens as an aphrodisiac called "Human Horn". Bender, Leela, and Fry discover that Fry's nose has been sold by a "porno dealing monster" to Lrrr, ruler of the planet Omicron Persei 8.

The three travel to Omicron Persei 8, where they learn Lrrr and his wife, Ndnd, are having marital troubles, explaining Lrrr's purchase. After retrieving Fry's nose, Leela reattaches it by laser. However, once Bender has finished explaining some details of human anatomy to Lrrr, Lrrr orders that Fry's "lower horn" now be removed for consumption. Leela stalls the Omicronian by suggesting that he and Ndnd travel to Earth to share a romantic dinner in the woods and work on their relationship. The dinner nearly fails; as Fry is about to get his lower horn removed, Bigfoot shows himself.

The park ranger also arrives, pleased to have finally gotten a look at Bigfoot. The ranger tries to amputate one of Bigfoot's feet as a trophy, but Lrrr prevents him. Lrrr then delivers a moving speech: Fry's "lower horn" like Bigfoot, is one of God's most beautiful creatures. Ndnd then realizes that her husband is still the sensitive Omicronian she fell for. The crew quickly retreats as the now-happy couple passionately make love.

As the credits roll, an episode of The Scary Door is shown.

== Production ==
Writer and producer David X. Cohen admits that this is one of the series' "filthiest" episodes. As with most episodes, the space scenes were done in 3D. Among the non-space scenes done in 3D was the roasting car at the alien market.

Originally, Fry was meant to look into Bender's "shiny metal ass" for his reflection but it was decided that the episode was dirty enough already and it was too awkward.

A scene depicting a holographic Fry with various noses was cut after being fully animated. Matt Groening said that they deleted it because it "wasn't that funny".

When watching the surveillance tape, Leela identifies Lrrr because the writers were not sure that the audience would recognize and clearly identify Lrrr.

Writer Ron Weiner admitted that Bender's offscreen quips were added because they felt a bit guilty about all the silly jokes. Weiner also admits that the scene with Bender dancing was something he attempts to work into every episode he writes.

The Scary Door sequence at the end had been cut out of the season three episode "The Birdbot of Ice-Catraz". Cohen had wanted it to not go to waste so the sequence was shortened slightly so it could be fit in during the credits of an episode.

== Cultural references ==
- Fry's line, "My nose, light of my face", is a reference to the opening line of Lolita by Vladimir Nabokov.
- The lengthy tube that Fry was abducted in is a reference to a Windows screensaver with winding pipes.
- Lrrr's line, "One of these days, Ndnd – bang, zoom, straight to the third moon of Omicron Persei 8!", is a reference to The Honeymooners.
- The title is a reference to the Spanish fly which was once used to produce an aphrodisiac.

== Broadcast and reception ==
In its initial airing, the episode received a Nielsen rating of 2.3/5, placing it 86th among primetime shows for the week of July 7–13, 2003.
