= Crimes of the Hot =

- Futurama episode
- Episode no.: Season 4 Episode 8
- Directed by: Peter Avanzino
- Written by: Aaron Ehasz
- Production code: 4ACV08
- Original air date: November 10, 2002

Guest appearance
- Al Gore as himself

Episode features
- Opening caption: Known To Cause Insanity In Laboratory Mice
- Opening cartoon: "Much Ado About Mutton" by Famous Studios (1947)

Episode chronology
← Previous "Jurassic Bark"	Next → "Teenage Mutant Leela's Hurdles"
- Futurama season 4

"Crimes of the Hot" is the eighth episode in the fourth season of the American animated television series Futurama, and the 62nd episode of the series overall. It originally aired on the Fox network in the United States on November 10, 2002. The episode was written by Aaron Ehasz and directed by Peter Avanzino. Al Gore guest stars as his own preserved head in a jar, his second appearance in the series. The episode tackles the topic of global warming as the Planet Express crew is sent to retrieve Earth's yearly ice supply in order to keep the planet cool. When they are unable to retrieve the ice, the Earth is forced to search for other ways to solve their global warming problem. In 2003, the episode was nominated for an Environmental Media Award.

== Plot ==
On Earth, the days are getting hotter and hotter. The crew, looking for an explanation, watch an old movie about global warming. The film explains a temporary solution for global warming was found by dropping a mountainous slab of ice into the ocean on a regular basis to cool it. The Planet Express crew is assigned the task of gathering a new slab of ice to drop in the ocean.

The crew goes to Halley's Comet, but finds that it is out of ice. With no ice left, the world's top scientists are called to a conference in Kyoto, Japan. Ogden Wernstrom uses a giant mirror to deflect 40% of the sun's rays, but a stray asteroid causes it to reflect the rays into a highly destructive beam. Professor Farnsworth reveals that robots, with their high-pollution emissions, are the cause of the crisis. The scientists, led by Wernstrom, decide to destroy all the robots on Earth.

Meanwhile, Bender is moved to tears after witnessing a news report on the migration of turtles due to the heat and decides to rescue one from Holland. When questioned by the crew Bender says he has many things in common with the turtle. He claims that both have a tough outer shell but a rich inner life. More importantly, he also confides the inability to get up if he falls directly on his back. Earth President Richard Nixon's head organizes a party for the unsuspecting robots on the remote Galapagos Islands, where he plans to destroy the entire robot population with an electromagnetic blast from an orbiting EMP cannon made from Wernstrom's mirror. Bender, who was at the meeting of scientists and thus knows of the plan, decides, for the sake of the turtles, that he will accept his fate and attend the party.

At the party, Bender is overheard saying that all the robots are doomed, causing panic. Farnsworth arrives with Fry and Leela and delivers a solution to the robots; every last one needs to blast their exhaust vents at the same time, straight up in the sky, in order to push the Earth farther from the Sun, thus cooling the Earth and causing the EMP cannon to miss its target. During the panic Bender and the turtle are knocked onto their backs and cannot get up, leaving not enough exhaust to move the Earth. As Bender is lamenting his fate, the turtle rocks from side to side and rolls to its feet. Shocked and inspired, but not to be shown up, Bender does the same, allowing him to release his massive exhaust, just barely saving the robots from the EMP. Farnsworth receives a medal of pollution for his work, and the extra week caused by the new orbit of the Earth is declared Robot Party Week.

== Production ==
The episode focuses on global warming in part because David X. Cohen's father had insisted upon it; however, Cohen jokes that his father was disappointed with the episode. Halley's Comet was originally going to be white and snowy in this episode, since that was what the staff's idea of a comet looked like; however, they later realized that, since the comet was "out of ice", it should be brown. The location chosen for the robot party was the Galapagos Islands because the writers thought that, if they were actually going to push the Earth out of orbit, they would need to be near the equator.

Al Gore was unable to attend the table reads of the script, so Maurice LaMarche read his lines. He notes in the DVD commentary that Gore's daughter Kristin, who wrote for Futurama, was also at the table read, and he jokes that this was one of the highlights of his career. Additional voice roles in the episode include Tress MacNeille as Joan Rivers' preserved head in a jar and LaMarche as the headless body of Spiro Agnew. Billy West, who voices Nixon's head, says that his impression of Nixon is not meant to be an accurate impression but it intentionally plays up certain quirks and flaws. West also voices the C-3PO-esque robot which appears early in the Professor's flashback. He accomplished the voice effect by speaking into a coffee cup during the recording of the lines.

== Continuity ==
- This is the second guest appearance by Al Gore who previously appeared in the episode "Anthology of Interest I".

== Cultural references ==
- Al Gore's head makes reference to the book Earth in the Balance, written by Al Gore in 1992; the second, more popular book, entitled Harry Potter and the Balance of Earth, is a reference to the Harry Potter book series.

== Broadcast and reception ==
Al Gore as depicted in the Futurama episode "Crimes of the Hot".

This episode was nominated for an Environmental Media Award in the television episodic-comedy category in 2003, it lost to the King of the Hill episode "I Never Promised You An Organic Garden". The episode has been used to highlight the dangers of global warming, particularly the retro-style public service announcement shown to the Planet Express employees at the beginning of the episode. A short clip from the episode was later used in An Inconvenient Truth to humorously explain how global warming works. Gore's appearance on Futurama is considered to be a part of his "carefully choreographed" reemergence after his loss in the 2000 Presidential election. The appearance also allowed him to show a different side of himself rather than the "personified synonym for woodenness" he had previously been known for in order to promote his book Joined at the Heart.

The episode received a "B" rating from Sci Fi Weekly noting that, while the episode was not one of the best in the series, it was still a solid effort and was "funny and irreverent". The reviewer praised the voicing in the episode, particularly Gore's performance, calling him "a stitch". He noted that there were many humorous moments in the episode, but overall it was too "scattered".
