= Futurama season 4 =

4th season of Futurama

Futurama
- Season 4
- DVD cover for the 2012 re-release of Volume Four featuring Amy Wong
- Showrunner: David X. Cohen
- No. of episodes: 18

Release
- Original network: Fox
- Original release: February 10, 2002 – August 10, 2003

Season chronology
- ← Previous; Season 3 Next → Season 5

The fourth season of Futurama began airing on February 10, 2002 and concluded after 18 episodes on August 10, 2003.

The complete 18 episodes of the season have been released on a box set called Futurama: Volume Four, on DVD and VHS. It was first released in Region 2 on November 24, 2003, with releases in other regions following in 2004. The season was re-released as Futurama: Volume 4, with entirely different packaging to match the newer season releases on July 17, 2012.

This is the last season that composer, Christopher Tyng, used a live orchestra before switching to a produced score, starting with Season 5. This is also the last season of the show to air on Fox, and the last season of the show's original run.

== Cast and characters ==
=== Regular ===
- Billy West as Philip J. Fry, Professor Farnsworth, Zoidberg, Zapp Brannigan, Leo Wong, Zookeeper, Richard Nixon's Head, Smitty, Humorbot 5.0, Judge Ron Whitey, Gus
- Katey Sagal as Turanga Leela
- John DiMaggio as Bender, Elzar, Randy, Sal, Mr. Panucci, Yancy Fry, Sr., Chain Smoker, URL, Barbados Slim, Igner
- Tress MacNeille as The Grand Midwife, Vyolet, Turanga Munda, Ndnd, Andrew, Petunia, Linda, Monique, Tinny Tim, Brett Blob, Mrs. Fry, Spotty Teen Robot, Mandy, Mom
- Maurice LaMarche as Kif Kroker, Raoul Inglis, Lrrr, Πkea Robot, Morbo, The Hyperchicken, Calculon, The Crushinator, Headless Clone of Agnew, Hedonismbot, Dandy Jim, Human-horn dealer
- Lauren Tom as Amy Wong, Inez Wong, Heather
- Phil LaMarr as Hermes Conrad, Dwight Conrad, Hugh Man, Antonio Calculon, Jr., Preacherbot, Robot 1-X
- David Herman as Scruffy, Warden Vogel, Dwayne, Leg Mutant, Turanga Morris, Mugger, Mayor Poopenmeyer, Ambassador Moivin, Scoop Chang, Dr. Wernstrom, Malfunctioning Eddie, Moose, Father Changstein el-Gamahl, Terry, Roberto, Fatbot, Whale Biologist, Dr. Ben Beeler

=== Recurring ===
- Dawnn Lewis as LaBarbara Conrad
- Bumper Robinson as Dwight Conrad
- Kath Soucie as Cubert Farnsworth
- Frank Welker as Nibbler, Seymour, Various Animals

=== Special guest stars ===
- Sigourney Weaver as Planet Express Ship (female)
- Lucy Liu as herself
- Phil Hendrie as Old Man Waterfall, Frida Waterfall
- Tom Kenny as Yancy Fry Jr.
- Al Gore as himself
- Bob Odenkirk as Chaz
- Jonathan Frakes as himself
- Walter Koenig as himself
- Nichelle Nichols as herself
- Leonard Nimoy as himself
- William Shatner as himself
- George Takei as himself
- Roseanne Barr as herself
- Dan Castellaneta as The Robot Devil

== Episodes ==
No. overall	No. in season	Title	Directed by	Written by	Original release date	Prod. code	U.S. viewers (millions)
55	1	"Kif Gets Knocked Up a Notch"	Wes Archer	Bill Odenkirk	January 12, 2003	4ACV01	5.73
Amy's relationship with Kif leads to pregnancy... Kif being the pregnant one. But Amy fears that she will not be able to handle the burdens of motherhood, much to Kif's dismay.
56	2	"Leela's Homeworld"	Mark Ervin	Kristin Gore	February 17, 2002	4ACV02	5.64
When Bender disposes nuclear waste in the sewers, the angry mutants drag him, Fry, and Leela down to the depths to be mutated. As they attempt to escape, two hooded figures manage to convince the mutants to let them go, and it's through chasing after these two that Leela discovers that the lost homeworld she's been looking for all her life has been much closer than she thought.
57	3	"Love and Rocket"	Brian Sheesley	Dan Vebber	February 10, 2002	4ACV03	6.27
After landing a major contract with a romance factory in Wisconsin and using the money to update the company, Bender falls deeply in love with the Planet Express ship autopilot's female voice setting (voiced by Sigourney Weaver). Meanwhile, Fry searches for the perfect candy heart to properly convey his feelings for Leela.
58	4	"Less Than Hero"	Susie Dietter	Ron Weiner	March 2, 2003	4ACV04	7.00
Dr. Zoidberg's mysterious miracle cream gives Fry and Leela superpowers. Teaming up with Bender, they form the New Justice Team, under the respective alter egos of Captain Yesterday, Clobberella, and Super King. But Leela's new duties as a superheroine put a strain on her relationship with her parents.
59	5	"A Taste of Freedom"	James Purdum	Eric Horsted	December 22, 2002	4ACV05	4.20
When Zoidberg publicly devours an Earth flag on Freedom Day, he is sentenced to death for his anarchic behavior. In protest, the Decapodians come to Zoidberg's aid by invading Earth, teaching the populace the true meaning of freedom.
60	6	"Bender Should Not Be Allowed on TV"	Ron Hughart	Lewis Morton	August 3, 2003	4ACV06	4.38
"All My Circuits" holds an audition to replace the part of Calculon's son after the original actor has a literal breakdown on-set, and Bender lands the part, despite not being a child robot actor. Soon, Bender's uninhibited behavior proves to be a bad influence on children, and an outraged Bender leads a protest group to get himself banned from the airwaves.
61	7	"Jurassic Bark"	Swinton O. Scott III	Eric Kaplan	November 17, 2002	4ACV07	5.98
Fry discovers his dog Seymour is being exhibited in a museum as a fossil, and takes it to Professor Farnsworth's lab to be revived. However, Bender is displeased with the lack of attention he has been receiving and becomes increasingly jealous of Seymour's fossil.
62	8	"Crimes of the Hot"	Peter Avanzino	Aaron Ehasz	November 10, 2002	4ACV08	4.15
The rapid increase in global warming (despite Leela telling Fry that nuclear winter canceled it out on "Xmas Story") is traced to a ventilation flaw that Professor Farnsworth failed to correct in his first robot prototype. As a result, all robots are ordered to be destroyed, but Bender refuses to go without a fight after adopting a turtle.
63	9	"Teenage Mutant Leela's Hurdles"	Bret Haaland	Jeff Westbrook	March 30, 2003	4ACV09	5.89
The crew's attempts to de-age Professor Farnsworth result in everyone returning to their more youthful stages. While Farnsworth seeks out a way to re-age the crew, the newly-teenaged Leela takes the opportunity to experience the parental childhood she never had.
64	10	"The Why of Fry"	Wes Archer	David X. Cohen	April 6, 2003	4ACV10	4.43
Still unable to impress Leela, Fry sadly suspects that he has no importance in life - until Nibbler takes him on a mission to prevent the brains (last seen on "The Day The Earth Stood Stupid") from destroying the universe. In the process, Fry learns what really happened when he was cryogenically frozen on December 31, 1999.
65	11	"Where No Fan Has Gone Before"	Patty Shinagawa	David A. Goodman	April 21, 2002	4ACV11	6.54
Fry leads the crew on a quest across the galaxy to regain the forbidden 79 episodes of "Star Trek: The Original Series", where they encounter the original cast of the show - as well as their captor, an obsessive energy being named Melllvar.
66	12	"The Sting"	Brian Sheesley	Patric M. Verrone	June 1, 2003	4ACV12	3.86
A mission to collect honey from deadly space bees leads to Fry's death from a stinger. Leela, who is wracked with remorse, soon finds solace in eating space bee honey, where she can meet Fry in her dreams. But as the hallucinations intensify, Leela must fight her addiction to the honey.
67	13	"Bend Her"	James Purdum	Michael Rowe	July 20, 2003	4ACV13	4.32
In order to compete in the Fembot's division of the 3004 Olympics, Bender is surgically rebuilt to become a woman named Coilette. Her trashy behavior angers Leela and Amy, who think she's making women look bad, but catches the eye of Calculon, with whom she develops a strong and confusing celebrity relationship.
68	14	"Obsoletely Fabulous"	Dwayne Carey-Hill	Dan Vebber	July 27, 2003	4ACV14	4.57
Bender is incompatible with Professor Farnsworth's new Robot 1-X, but rather than get an upgrade, Bender escapes to a desert island to start his life anew. There, he meets several other outdated robots and receives a downgrade, then leads his new comrades in a rebellion against technology.
69	15	"The Farnsworth Parabox"	Ron Hughart	Bill Odenkirk	June 8, 2003	4ACV15	4.79
Professor Farnsworth forbids the crew to look inside a mysterious box. Leela can't resist taking a peek, discovering the box to be a gateway to a parallel universe.
70	16	"Three Hundred Big Boys"	Swinton O. Scott III	Eric Kaplan	June 15, 2003	4ACV16	4.39
A $300 refund for all taxpayers results in a series of interconnected stories, following the Planet Express crew's adventures in spending the money.
71	17	"Spanish Fry"	Peter Avanzino	Ron Weiner	July 13, 2003	4ACV17	3.95
During a camping trip, Fry is abducted by aliens, who harvest his nose as an aphrodisiac. The crew traces Fry's missing nose to Lrrr, leader of the Omicronians, who decides that Fry's "lower horn" would be a much better aphrodisiac to jump start his stagnant marriage with Ndnd.
72	18	"The Devil's Hands Are Idle Playthings"	Bret Haaland	Ken Keeler	August 10, 2003	4ACV18	4.31
Desperate to learn how to play the holophonor in order to impress Leela, Fry swaps hands with the Robot Devil. He goes on to become a skilled holophonor player, winning Leela's heart and penning an opera about her life story, but the Robot Devil still has a trick or two up his sleeve.

== Reception ==
The fourth season was met with critical acclaim and remains popular among the show's fanbase. Andy Patrizio of IGN wrote a positive review of the season, giving it a score of 8 out of 10.

== Home releases ==
The original Volume Four home release.

Futurama: Volume Four
Set details			Special Features
18 episodes; 4-disc set (DVD); 1.33:1 aspect ratio; Languages: English (Dolby Surround); Subtitles: English SDH; French; Spanish			Optional full-length commentaries on all 18 episodes, plus one bonus commentary featuring Matt Groening, David X. Cohen, and the writers on "Jurassic Bark".; Deleted scenes from 16 episodes; Storyboards for "Kif Gets Knocked Up a Notch"; Concept art still gallery; "How to draw Professor Farnsworth and Bender" featurette; International clips; Animatic and 3D models; Hidden feature with David Goodman and John DiMaggio easter egg; Hidden script table read Easter egg (media); Hidden unused title captions Easter egg (media); Hidden poster in alien writing Easter egg (media)
DVD/VHS release dates
Region 1	Region 2	Region 4	
August 24, 2004	November 24, 2003	February 18, 2004	

Futurama: Volume 4
Set details			Special Features
18 episodes; 4-disc set; 1.33:1 aspect ratio; Languages: English (Dolby Surround); Subtitles: English SDH; French; Spanish			Optional full-length commentaries on all 18 episodes; Deleted scenes from 16 episodes; Storyboards for "Kif Gets Knocked Up a Notch"; Concept art still gallery; "How to draw Professor Farnsworth and Bender" featurette; International clips; Animatic and 3D models; Hidden feature with David Goodman and John DiMaggio easter egg; Hidden script table read easter egg; Hidden unused title captions easter egg; Hidden poster in alien writing easter egg
DVD release dates			Optional full-length commentaries on all 18 episodes; Deleted scenes from 16 episodes; Storyboards for "Kif Gets Knocked Up a Notch"; Concept art still gallery; "How to draw Professor Farnsworth and Bender" featurette; International clips; Animatic and 3D models; Hidden feature with David Goodman and John DiMaggio easter egg; Hidden script table read easter egg; Hidden unused title captions easter egg; Hidden poster in alien writing easter egg
Region 1	Region 2	Region 4	Optional full-length commentaries on all 18 episodes; Deleted scenes from 16 episodes; Storyboards for "Kif Gets Knocked Up a Notch"; Concept art still gallery; "How to draw Professor Farnsworth and Bender" featurette; International clips; Animatic and 3D models; Hidden feature with David Goodman and John DiMaggio easter egg; Hidden script table read easter egg; Hidden unused title captions easter egg; Hidden poster in alien writing easter egg
July 17, 2012	—N/a	March 13, 2013	Optional full-length commentaries on all 18 episodes; Deleted scenes from 16 episodes; Storyboards for "Kif Gets Knocked Up a Notch"; Concept art still gallery; "How to draw Professor Farnsworth and Bender" featurette; International clips; Animatic and 3D models; Hidden feature with David Goodman and John DiMaggio easter egg; Hidden script table read easter egg; Hidden unused title captions easter egg; Hidden poster in alien writing easter egg
