= Kif Gets Knocked Up a Notch =

- Futurama episode
- Episode no.: Season 4 Episode 1
- Directed by: Wes Archer
- Written by: Bill Odenkirk
- Production code: 4ACV01
- Original air date: January 12, 2003

Episode features
- Opening caption: Bigfoot's Choice
- Opening cartoon: "It's a Greek Life" by Van Beuren Studios (1936)

Episode chronology
| ← Previous "The 30% Iron Chef" | Next → "Leela's Homeworld" |
- Futurama season 4

"Kif Gets Knocked Up a Notch" is the first episode in the fourth season of the American animated television series Futurama, and the 55th episode of the series overall. It first aired on Fox in the United States on January 12, 2003. The episode was written by Bill Odenkirk and directed by Wes Archer. The plot centers on Kif and Amy's relationship; Kif is suddenly impregnated so he returns to his homeworld to give birth. The episode was generally well received by critics.

== Plot ==
Amy is unhappy with her long-distance relationship with Kif and wants to see him in person again. The crew is sent to deliver a giant pill to a planet near where Kif is stationed, so Amy stows away on board the Planet Express Ship. While the crew is asleep, Amy changes course to meet with Kif. When Zapp Brannigan sees the ship, the Planet Express crew joins him on the Nimbus. On the Nimbus, Kif implores Amy to move in with him and shows her the HoloShed to illustrate what life would be like with him. Soon, however, the shed malfunctions and the holograms that invade become real. When the holograms reach the rest of the crew, Zapp Brannigan accidentally blasts a hole in the ship, which sucks out the holograms. Everyone else on the ship is also sucked towards the hole, but they hang on to each other's hands until the moon from the Holoshed plugs the hole. Later, at the sickbay, the doctor reports that everyone survived with only minor injuries, and also reveals that Kif is pregnant.

Kif explains to the crew that his race reproduces through touch, their skin being a semi-permeable membrane which can absorb genetic material. They become sexually fertile whenever they experience strong positive emotions for another being, as Kif did with Amy on the HoloShed. Fry points out that everyone on the ship touched Kif while he was trying to hang onto them to prevent being sucked through the hole and it is unclear who the mother is. Professor Farnsworth uses an invention of his, the Maternifuge, to determine the real mother. The machine filters out its occupants based on a DNA sample, revealing that the mother is Leela. Amy is instead only the "smizmar" of Kif's children, but Kif reveals that she is still considered the true parent by his species' culture. Amy is dismayed at being cast in the role of a mother, however, her parents are surprisingly happy about having a grandchild and demand Amy and Kif call Amy's mom "Grandma" all the time, however, at Fry and Bender's apartment for the pre-birth celebrations, Amy runs away.

With Kif's pregnancy nearing its end, the crew takes Kif to Amphibios 9, his homeworld. Kif encounters the Grand Midwife, who oversees the birthing ceremony, which traditionally involves the participation of the smizmar, further underscoring Kif's sadness at Amy's abandonment. Just as Kif is about to give birth, Amy arrives saying she wants to be with him despite not being ready for motherhood. After Kif gives birth, the babies, in a tadpole-like state, make it to the swampy water and are left to swim about until they are able to live out of water, which Kif reveals will not happen for twenty years, thus relieving Amy of any maternal duties until then.

== Production ==
At the beginning of the episode, when Professor Farnsworth retreats to the angry dome, there was a debate amongst the writers about whether the viewers should be able to hear him or not. They envisioned the angry dome as being similar to the Cone of Silence from Get Smart, but ultimately it was decided that hearing the professor was funnier. The writers also had a debate about who the second parent of Kif's children should be. Writer Bill Odenkirk notes that they felt making Amy the true parent would make her character unlikable after she did not accept the children.

In the scene in Kif's room, Bender is seen in Kif's closet with his head and body separated. No explanation for this is ever given in the episode. However, on the DVD commentary, it is revealed that it was originally going to be explained that the room was much too small to have everybody fit inside, and that Bender was in the closet out of necessity. The original script also contained a much longer series of events once the characters arrived at Kif's planet. The material that was eventually cut focused on the journey and a series of tasks Kif needed to complete before giving birth. The material was supposedly as long as an entire episode.

== Cultural references ==
- The animation of the Planet Express Ship entering the Nimbus’ cargo hold is a reference to the film You Only Live Twice, although on the DVD commentary, the creators mistake it for Moonraker.
- The HoloShed (and its frequent malfunctions turning holograms "real") are parodies of the holodeck from Star Trek: The Next Generation. Among the HoloShed characters who run rampant are Professor Moriarty, Attila the Hun, Jack the Ripper, and an evil version of Abraham Lincoln. A holodeck incarnation of Professor Moriarty "came alive" in two episodes of Star Trek: The Next Generation – "Elementary, Dear Data" and "Ship in a Bottle" – while Jack the Ripper and Lincoln appeared in Star Trek: The Original Series; "Evil Lincoln" is a specific reference to the episode "The Savage Curtain", where aliens pit some of Earth's most storied heroes (including Lincoln) against its most hated villains.
- The HoloShed is programmed in BASIC because the writers were amused by the idea that in the Star Trek universe, any simulation one wants to experience has already been painstakingly programmed.
- The sick bay scene is a parody of that from Star Trek: The Original Series, complete with sound effects. The sign references a creature from the series called a Horta. The sick bay's doctor is a parody of Dr. Leonard “Bones” McCoy.
- The maternifuge is based loosely on the amusement park ride, "The Rotor".
- Kif, a male, being impregnated by Leela, a female, by only touching hands is a reference to Charles “Trip“ Tucker III of Enterprise being impregnated by an alien species by only putting his hands into clear beads with an alien female to play a “game”.

== Reception ==
Zack Handlen of The A.V. Club gave the episode a B+, saying: "At the very least, it makes an effort to deal with Kif and Amy in a way that’s unexpected, surprisingly heartwarming, and more than a little disgusting. But it’s hampered by a structural choice which, while allowing for a big surprise in the final act, takes focus away from [Amy,] the one character who has anything resembling an arc in the story."
