= The Farnsworth Parabox =

- Futurama episode
- Episode no.: Season 4 Episode 15
- Directed by: Ron Hughart
- Written by: Bill Odenkirk
- Production code: 4ACV15
- Original air date: June 8, 2003

Episode features
- Opening caption: Beats A Hard Kick In The Face
- Opening cartoon: "The Queen Was in the Parlor" from Merrie Melodies by Warner Bros. Cartoons (1932)

Episode chronology
← Previous "Obsoletely Fabulous"	Next → "Three Hundred Big Boys"
- Futurama season 4

"The Farnsworth Parabox" is the fifteenth episode in the fourth season of the American animated television series Futurama, and the 69th episode of the series overall. It first aired on the Fox network in the United States on June 8, 2003. The episode was written by Bill Odenkirk and directed by Ron Hughart. The plot of this episode revolves around the Planet Express crew's adventures in parallel universes.

== Plot ==
Professor Farnsworth plans to destroy a yellow box containing a dangerous experiment by ejecting it into the sun. He forbids the Planet Express staff from opening it, and Hermes assigns Leela to guard it. Tempted to open the box, Leela flips a coin to decide whether to look inside; after getting a positive result, she falls into the box and finds herself in a parallel universe with other versions of the Planet Express crew.

The parallel Leela orders everyone in the original universe to enter their universe, as the parallel Professor believes the original universe members are evil. The two Farnsworths discover that, just as the original Farnsworth accidentally invented a box containing a parallel universe, the parallel universe Farnsworth accidentally invented a box containing the original universe. They also discover that coin flips have opposite outcomes, which explains why the parallel Leela did not open the box she was guarding. Fry and Leela discover that their doppelgangers are happily married, because at one point the two Leelas each flipped a coin to decide whether to accept a date from Fry.

The Professors determine that nobody is evil and the members of both universes befriend one another. Just before the original Planet Express crew returns home, parallel Hermes arrives to destroy the box containing the original universe. The crew realize that this means the original universe Hermes must be doing the same thing to the box containing the parallel universe. They plan to go back through the box to stop Hermes but discover that the box is missing, having been stolen by the two Zoidbergs. The two Farnsworths try to recreate the original box, but accidentally create a large number of boxes containing different universes. The Zoidbergs flee into the boxes, leading to a chase across multiple dimensions. They are eventually caught, and everyone jumps into the box containing the original universe just in time to prevent Hermes from destroying the box containing the parallel universe.

The two crews say goodbye before returning to their respective universes. To ensure the safety of both, the Farnsworths exchange their universe-boxes by pulling each through the other, meaning that each now paradoxically has a box containing their own universe. Fry asks Leela on a date; she flips a coin, then decides to accept without viewing the result.

== Broadcast and reception ==
In 2006, this episode was ranked 17th on IGN's list of the top 25 episodes of Futurama. The episode was noted for its humor as a standalone episode and in particular for Universe #420 where Professor Farnsworth tells his hippie counterpart to get a job. The 2013 revision of the list bumped the episode up to number 16, reassessing it as better than "The Devil's Hands Are Idle Playthings", "Space Pilot 3000", the two "Anthology of Interest" episodes, "Parasites Lost", "Fry and the Slurm Factory", and "Love's Labors Lost in Space", all of which had previously been ranked higher. The reassessment praised the episode's study of alternate Futurama realities. In 2013, it was ranked number 6 "as voted on by fans" for Comedy Central's Futurama Fanarama marathon.
