= Teenage Mutant Leela's Hurdles =

- Futurama episode
- Episode no.: Season 4 Episode 9
- Directed by: Bret Haaland
- Written by: Jeff Westbrook
- Production code: 4ACV09
- Original air date: March 30, 2003

Episode features
- Opening caption: Now Interactive! Joystick controls Fry's left ear
- Opening cartoon: "Moonlight for Two" from Merrie Melodies by Warner Bros. Cartoons (1932)

Episode chronology
← Previous "Crimes of the Hot"	Next → "The Why of Fry"
- Futurama season 4

"Teenage Mutant Leela's Hurdles" is the ninth episode in the fourth season of the American animated television series Futurama, and the 63rd episode of the series overall. It first aired on the Fox network in the United States on March 30, 2003. The episode was directed by Bret Haaland and written by Jeff Westbrook. In the episode, the Planet Express crew take Professor Farnsworth to a clinic to make him younger though the use of tar. A freak accident occurs and the entire crew are covered in the tar, thus reverting them to their younger selves. They seek to reverse the effect and return to their proper ages.

== Plot ==
Professor Farnsworth is chasing his escaped gargoyle, Pazuzu, but soon forgets the search and goes to Florida to have a discounted early dinner. Annoyed with the Professor's crankiness, the Planet Express employees take the 161-year-old to an age-reducing spa, where he is given a massage, then bathed in blistering hot tar. An accident causes the entire crew to fall into the tar pit, reverting the Professor to his mid-fifties and everyone else to teenagers. Leela departs to live with her parents in the sewers so that she can have a new chance at the normal teenage life she never had. A teenage Fry and Leela begin dating while Amy is the subject of jokes back on Mars due to her childhood obesity.

The Professor searches for a way to undo the de-aging effects by removing time-altering chronitons that have become stuck to their DNA. However, his plan backfires and causes everyone (except for Leela, who refused the treatment) to start growing even younger. Leela sneaks out of her house after being grounded to help the others find the mythical Fountain of Aging. The fountain's current proves too strong for the young crew, so Leela jumps in to save them, giving up her chance at being a teenager again. She pulls everyone except the Professor to safety, but Pazuzu returns to save him. Everyone has returned to their original ages, and the Professor is delighted to find that he is actually a few years older than before and sets Pazuzu free to thank him. The episode ends with a jump to a later time in which Pazuzu finishes telling the story to his child as they perch on the roof of the Notre-Dame Cathedral in Paris.

== Cultural references ==
- The space station the Professor inadvertently destroys is a parody of Star Trek: Deep Space Nine's namesake station. The producers explained on the DVD commentary this did not mean they disliked Deep Space Nine; they thought it was one of the best Star Trek series.

== Reception ==
This episode, along with "Where No Fan Has Gone Before" has been called one of the great moments of the fourth season. Zack Handlen of The A.V. Club gave the episode an A−.
