= I Second That Emotion (Futurama) =

- Futurama episode
- Episode no.: Season 2 Episode 1
- Directed by: Mark Ervin
- Written by: Patric M. Verrone
- Production code: 2ACV01
- Original air date: November 21, 1999

Episode features
- Opening caption: Made From Meat By-Products
- Opening cartoon: "Fresh Hare" from Merrie Melodies by Warner Bros. Cartoons (1942)

Episode chronology
← Previous "Fry and the Slurm Factory"	Next → "Brannigan, Begin Again"
- Futurama season 2

"I Second That Emotion" is the first episode in the second season of the American animated television series Futurama, and the 14th episode of the series overall. It originally aired on the Fox network in the United States on November 21, 1999. The episode was written by Patric M. Verrone and directed by Mark Ervin. The episode introduces the recurring sewer mutants, a society of humans who have been mutated by years of exposure to pollution and radioactive waste poured into the sewers from New New York.

== Plot ==
When Nibbler chips his fang, he is taken to a vet, and during the time, is found out to be five years old. Nibbler has a birthday party, and Bender becomes annoyed that Nibbler is getting more attention than him. Having reluctantly made a birthday cake for Nibbler, Bender is aghast to see Nibbler gobble it all up before everybody else can praise Bender for the cake. In extreme annoyance, Bender flushes Nibbler down the toilet. Leela is distraught at the loss of her pet and wishes Bender could understand the emotions of others. Professor Farnsworth proposes a solution: installing an empathy chip in Bender's head that will cause him to feel other people's emotions. After forcibly installing the chip, the chip is tuned to pick up Leela's emotions, so that whatever feelings Leela experiences, Bender automatically experiences them as well.

After a night of experiencing a multitude of Leela's feelings, Bender misses Nibbler so much that he cannot stand it any longer. When Fry tells him that alligators can supposedly live after being flushed, Bender flushes parts of himself down the toilet in pursuit of Nibbler. Fry and Leela enter the sewers and quickly manage to find Bender and a crowd of mutants who live in the sewers. The mutants introduce them to their subterranean civilization. They also reveal that a monster called El Chupanibre has been terrorizing them.

Leela, thinking that Nibbler is the monster, is happy until she is informed that the only way to lure the monster out is to offer a "snackrifice" in the form of a virgin. Although not one herself (because of her run-in with Zapp Brannigan), Leela is chosen anyway to be the sacrifice. At the sacrifice, Nibbler emerges from a pipe: however, the mutants point out Nibbler is not the beast they fear, but the large, reptilian monster behind him, who is the real El Chupanibre. Fry gets entangled in the trap that was meant for El Chupanibre, leaving only Bender to fight the beast; however, Leela is so scared, for herself and the others, that Bender is immobilized by her emotions. He and Fry teach Leela to stop caring about other people and care only about herself, and as a result, Bender is able to fight off the beast, whom he eventually flushes down a giant toilet into the sub-sewers.

Back at Planet Express, the Professor removes Bender's empathy chip after Bender demands that he do so. When the chip is taken out the Professor says in amazement that it burned out, meaning Bender's feelings of empathy for Leela were his own. He then corrects himself, saying that the chip was actually running at triple capacity. Bender retains his 'in-your-face' interface and has apparently learned nothing, while Leela learns that adopting Bender's attitude is often better than being nice.

== Continuity ==
Leela's parents appearing in the episode (upper left)

- Before the episode, a fictitious short commercial for a product called "Glagnar's Human Rinds", a product similar to pork rinds but made from humans, is featured, with the tagline "It's a muncha-buncha-cruncha human!". This gag would be reused in "Raging Bender".
- In the scene where Fry, Leela, and Bender are surrounded by the mutants, Leela's real mother and father (who are not introduced until season four) are clearly visible in the crowd. This appearance was intentional on the part of the creators who had conceived of Leela's true origin before they even pitched the idea for Futurama to FOX. This episode features the original design for Leela's parents in which Morris has a normal mouth and Munda has normal human arms. It was later decided that the characters would need to appear more mutated and the design was changed.
- Raoul, the 'Supreme Mutant', is depicted in this episode with his third arm having replaced his right ear, with a few jokes being made referencing his reduced ability to hear as a result of it. However, later episodes show him as having both ears, and his third arm is placed slightly higher on his head.
- Bender imitates a Harlem Globetrotters routine and whistles their theme song, "Sweet Georgia Brown". His love of the Globetrotters and desire to become one would become a subplot in the season three episode "Time Keeps On Slippin'".
- Although celebrating Nibbler's fifth birthday in this episode, it is later revealed in "The Day the Earth Stood Stupid" that Nibbler is, in fact, seventeen years older than the universe itself.
- Bender's catchphrase is "bite my shiny metal ass". Nibbler actually does so at the beginning of the episode.

== Casting ==
Starting this episode, Tress MacNeille is now credited under a "Starring" role instead of "Guest Star". Maurice LaMarche, former MADtv castmembers David Herman and Phil LaMarr, and King of the Hill voice actress Lauren Tom, however, remain as guest stars and stay that way for the rest of the series until Season 6 in 2010.

== Cultural references ==
- One of the animals in the vet's office is very similar to a rust monster from the Dungeons & Dragons role-playing game.
- The title of the episode comes from the 1967 hit song by The Miracles titled "I Second That Emotion" (as well as a pun on the expression "I second that motion", when an action has been suggested by one member of a group and another member announces his support for it). In the audio commentary for this episode, the commentators debate whether or not the episode's title is also a reference to the fact that this episode is the season two premiere.
