= Love and Rocket =

- Futurama episode
- Episode no.: Season 4 Episode 3
- Directed by: Brian Sheesley
- Written by: Dan Vebber
- Production code: 4ACV03
- Original air date: February 10, 2002

Guest appearances
- Sigourney Weaver as The Female Planet Express Ship; Lucy Liu as herself

Episode features
- Opening caption: When You See The Robot, Drink!
- Opening cartoon: "In a Cartoon Studio" by Van Beuren Studios (1931)

Episode chronology
← Previous "Leela's Homeworld"	Next → "Less Than Hero"
- Futurama season 4

"Love and Rocket" is the third episode in the fourth season of the American animated television series Futurama, and the 57th episode of the series overall. It first aired on the Fox network in the United States on February 10, 2002. The episode is a Valentine's Day-themed episode that centers on Bender's relationship with the artificial intelligence of the Planet Express Ship. The subplot involves Fry trying to express his feelings for Leela through the use of Valentine's Day candy. The episode parodies 2001: A Space Odyssey.

== Plot ==
A few days before Valentine's Day, the Planet Express crew tries to land a delivery contract with Romanticorp, a company that produces romantic things. During a tour of the facilities, Fry becomes obsessed with finding the perfect conversation heart to express his feelings for Leela, but she just finds this antic annoying, and says she finds words irrelevant next to the quality of the man saying them. Planet Express gets the contract and with the additional funding, Professor Farnsworth makes some upgrades to the Planet Express Ship. The upgrades include a new personality, complete with a female voice module. Bender and the ship's new personality fall for each other and start dating. Bender quickly grows tired of the ship, and begins cheating on her. The ship, suspicious of Bender, begins acting in an increasingly possessive and erratic manner.

The crew is assigned the task of delivering several tons of conversation hearts to Lrrr as a peace offering. The Omicronians are highly offended by the chalky candies and their saccharine messages. While escaping from the Omicronian death fleet, Bender decides to break up with the Planet Express Ship. This cracks the ship's fragile mind, and it comes to a stop, allowing the Omicronian missiles to strike.

The ship is sent tumbling through space, dented and scorched, but physically intact. Leela attempts to console the ship, but fails. The ship decides to fly into a quasar so that the power of the ten billion black holes in it will merge her and Bender into a perfect quantum singularity. She offers to stop if Bender merges his programming with hers, but he refuses. To eliminate any interference from Fry or Leela, the ship turns off the oxygen and artificial gravity. They don the on-board oxygen tanks to survive and make plans to disable the ship.

Bender distracts the ship by taking her up on her earlier proposal to merge their programming, while Leela begins shutting down the ship's brain by popping the tops of its carbonated logic unit. While searching the conversation hearts, Fry notices that Leela's oxygen supply is critically low. He hooks her mask up to his tank to keep her alive. Completely oblivious to this sacrifice, Leela finishes shutting down the ship's artificial intelligence, returning every system to normal. She then finds Fry unresponsive due to the lack of oxygen. Leela gives him mouth-to-mouth resuscitation. Fry awakens and coughs up a candy heart with the message, "U leave me breathless"; the two smile and wish each other a Happy Valentine's Day. Bender emerges, unaware that a little of the ship's program is still merged with his. Leela decides to dump the undelivered hearts into the quasar instead of cleaning them up. The hearts vaporize, producing a romantic fuchsia-colored radiation that is harmless on Earth and visible during Valentine's Day, but destroys many planets in the process. Couples around Earth (and Zoidberg, who is inexplicably narrating this section) happily gaze at the beautiful space phenomenon.

== Production ==
Lucy Liu's lines in this episode were recorded during the production of the season three episode "I Dated a Robot". When recording Liu's lines for "I Dated a Robot", the staff had her record around six generic lines, with the intent that at least one of them would be used as a throwaway joke in a future episode.

== Cultural references ==
- The episode's title is a reference to the alternative comic Love and Rockets.
- The ending sequences with the quasar is a reference to the ending sequence of 2010: The Year We Make Contact, in which Jupiter explodes and everyone around the world gazes at the new sun in the sky.
- There are a handful of references to 2001: A Space Odyssey within the episode. The Planet Express Ship's AI resembles HAL 9000 in appearance. The song "Daisy Bell" is sung by Bender during the first montage for his love of the ship. "Daisy Bell" was the earliest memory by the HAL 9000, sung in 2001 by HAL while he is being deactivated by Bowman. The Planet Express Ship also gives a nod to HAL's famous line, "I'm sorry, Dave. I'm afraid I can't do that," and also laments over being unable to read lips when Fry, Leela and Bender escape to a place where the Planet Express Ship can't hear them.
- Lrrr and Ndnd are watching Friends when the Planet Express crew arrive to make the delivery, and Lrrr comments that it is a "Joey heavy episode". He also wonders why Ross, the “largest of the friends,” does not simply eat the other five.
- When Bender is arguing with the ship over art censorship, he flips through a book and shows the AI a painting called “Venus de Venus”, which bears striking resemblance to Venus de Milo.

== Reception ==
Zack Handlen of The A.V. Club gave the episode a positive review, scoring it an A− and summarizing with: "[The episode] remains one of show’s more memorable outings; the guest voice is inspired, the gags are sharp throughout, and the romantic-with-more-than-a-little-horror take on love seems pretty well thought out."
