= Less Than Hero =

- Futurama episode
- Episode no.: Season 4 Episode 4
- Directed by: Susie Dietter
- Written by: Ron Weiner
- Production code: 4ACV04
- Original air date: March 2, 2003

Episode features
- Opening caption: Soon To Be A Major Religion
- Opening cartoon: "The Dover Boys at Pimento University" from Merrie Melodies by Warner Bros. Cartoons (1942)

Episode chronology
← Previous "Love and Rocket"	Next → "A Taste of Freedom"
- Futurama season 4

"Less Than Hero" is the fourth episode in the fourth season of the American animated television series Futurama, and the 58th episode of the series overall. It first aired on the Fox network in the United States on March 2, 2003. The episode was directed by Susie Dietter and written by Ron Weiner. The plot centers on Fry, Leela, and Bender as they masquerade as superheroes after being granted superpowers through the use of a 'miracle cream'. The subplot focuses on the relationship between Leela and her parents. The episode's title itself is a play on the Brett Easton Ellis novel Less than Zero, as well as the 1987 film of the same name.

== Plot ==
In this episode, Professor Farnsworth orders a supercollider from πKEA; after assembling it, Fry and Leela are left with sore muscles, so Dr. Zoidberg prescribes them "Dr. Flimflam's Miracle Cream". While Fry and Leela are returning the broken supercollider to the store, a homeless man attempts to mug them, but Fry and Leela fight back. They discover they are immune to laser fire and physical attacks, a side effect of the 'miracle cream'; they also gain the abilities of super strength and super speed. They form a team of superheroes, the New Justice Team, taking the names "Captain Yesterday", and "Clobberella", with Bender joining them as "Super King".

Leela makes a visit to CitiHall, and procures a special one-day surface pass for her mutant parents from the sewers. Shortly after, the mayor summons the New Justice Team to deal with a criminal threat. The Museum of Natural History is going to be robbed of the Quantum Gemerald at 9 a.m. by a criminal mastermind called the Zookeeper, who uses trained animals to aid him in his crimes.

Leela, planning her day, schedules her parents' surface visit for 10 a.m. at the same museum. Her plans are ruined when the Zookeeper is an hour late for the theft. The New Justice Team foils the robbery, but the Zookeeper escapes. Leela's parents are convinced that Leela did not meet them because she is ashamed of them.

Leela makes a trip to her parents' home, where she apologizes. They forgive her, saying she could never disappoint them, but her guilt is too much for her to bear, and she reveals her superhero identity, so her parents understand why she did not meet them. Leela swears them to secrecy for their own protection, but Morris cannot hold his tongue for long and tells his friends, and the word spreads. Planet Express receives a call from the Zookeeper, who has kidnapped Leela's parents. He is willing to ransom them for the Quantum Gemerald, which he demands they steal for him.

The New Justice Team resolves to steal the gem. They have run out of miracle cream and are forced to commit the robbery without superpowers. The museum guards still think The New Justice Team have superpowers, and the Gemerald is retrieved successfully. They give the Quantum Gemerald to the Zookeeper, who releases Leela's parents and escapes. Leela and her parents resolve their issues. Bender and Fry set off to commit a few more crimes while they still have their superhero costumes.

== Broadcast and reception ==
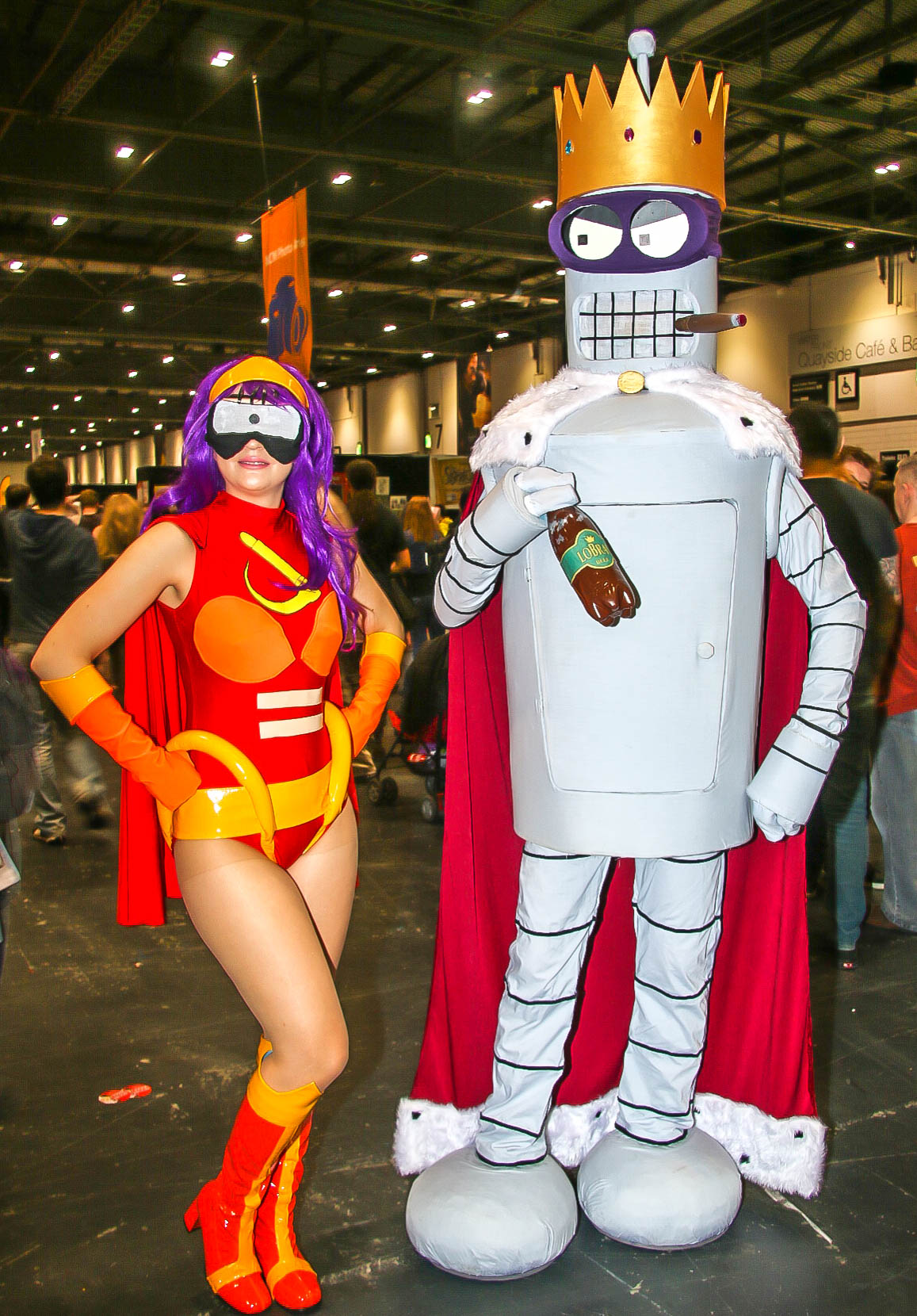
Cosplayers depicting Leela/Clobberella and Bender/Superking.

In its initial airing, the episode received a Nielsen rating of 5.0/9.

Zack Handlen of The A.V. Club gave the episode an A, saying: "Seeing Leela, Fry, and Bender work together as a team nearly always makes for something grand, and on the whole, “Less Than Hero” doesn't disappoint. Its ambitions are modest, and it makes the most of them. Plus, it offers the rare chance to see super-heroes being ridiculous for no other reason than they want to. We could use more of that, really."
