= The Why of Fry =

- Futurama episode
- Episode no.: Season 4 Episode 10
- Directed by: Wes Archer
- Written by: David X. Cohen
- Production code: 4ACV10
- Original air date: April 6, 2003

Guest appearance
- Bob Odenkirk as Chaz

Episode features
- Opening caption: Dancing Space Potatoes? You Bet!
- Opening cartoon: "Much Ado About Mutton" by Famous Studios (1947)

Episode chronology
← Previous "Teenage Mutant Leela's Hurdles"	Next → "Where No Fan Has Gone Before"
- Futurama season 4

"The Why of Fry" is the tenth episode in the fourth season of the American animated television series Futurama, and the 64th episode of the series overall. It originally aired on Fox in the United States on April 6, 2003. The episode later aired in the United Kingdom in August 2003. The episode was written by David X. Cohen and directed by Wes Archer, who also directed 26 episodes of The Simpsons and six episodes of King Of The Hill. In this episode, it is revealed that Fry's cryogenic freezing and arrival in the 31st century was not an accident, but a calculated plot by Nibbler to save the universe. Along with "Where No Fan Has Gone Before" (which directly succeeds this episode in production order), it is one of two episodes that do not feature Professor Farnsworth.

== Plot ==
Fry feels useless after Leela and Bender return from a mission without him. Leela asks Fry to walk Nibbler. Fry believes the only good he serves is cleaning up after Nibbler, but Nibbler claims otherwise, then knocks him out and takes him to Eternium, Nibbler's homeworld. The Nibblonians explain that because Fry lacks the delta brainwave on account of his being his own grandfather, he was immune to the attack of the Brain spawn a few months prior.

The Nibblonians reveal the Brain spawn's plan to collect all knowledge in the universe, store it in a colossal memory bank called the Infosphere, and destroy the rest of the universe. Fry is the only one who can stop them. The Nibblonians give Fry a bomb which will send the sphere into an alternate dimension, and a wind-up toy spaceship. Fry plants the bomb but is detected; when he tries to escape, his vessel falls apart.

The Brain spawn show Fry footage from the night he was frozen on December 31, 1999. Fry is upset to learn that Nibbler tipped him into the cryogenic chamber, sending him to the year 3000. Nibbler explains that he had to do so, so Fry could defeat the Brain spawn. The bomb detonates, sending the Infosphere to the alternate dimension.

In the alternate dimension, the Brain spawn offer to send Fry back in time to stop Nibbler from freezing him. Fry accepts and is transported to the cryogenics lab. He appears behind Nibbler under the desk, just before his past self is frozen. He restrains Nibbler, who protests that Fry must be sent to the future to save the universe. Nibbler asks if there is anything Fry wants to save in the future, and Fry mentions Leela. After Nibbler advises Fry not to give up on her, and vows to help him win Leela's heart, Fry tips his past self into the cryogenic chamber. Before disappearing from the timeline, Fry tells Nibbler the vessel he was given was unsuitable.

In the future, Fry plants the bomb again and escapes the Infosphere, using an upgraded vessel this time. Nibbler and Fry return to Earth, and Nibbler gives Fry a flower before wiping his memory. When Fry gives Leela the flower, she tells him that although he may not be the most important person in the universe, she is happy to see him and kisses him.

== Continuity ==
David X. Cohen notes that he was particularly enthusiastic to write this episode because of how it tied into other episodes, feeling that it was something that was rarely done in sitcoms, particularly cartoons. He points out that the writing staff tried to tie as many episodes together as possible regardless of whether they were originally written with that intent. The episode contains flashbacks to the events of "Space Pilot 3000" when Fry is originally frozen. Cohen points out that Nibbler's shadow is present in the pilot episode, a point which is explained in this episode, and that this was a plot point which was planned since the pilot. Jokes about the extreme mass of Nibbler's feces and mention of Vergon 6 call back to "Love's Labours Lost in Space". The planet Eternium, the Brainspawn, and the delta brainwave concept were originally introduced in "The Day the Earth Stood Stupid". A joke about Fry becoming his own grandfather is a reference to the events of "Roswell That Ends Well". Cohen also notes that in the episode "Jurassic Bark", a shot of Nibbler's third eye sticking out of a trash can is included as a reference to these events as well, an item which many fans had noticed.

== Production ==
David X. Cohen states in the episode commentary that he was eager to write this episode in part because it was something that had been discussed since the very beginning of the show. They had wanted to show that there was a larger conspiracy that had brought Fry to the future and notes on more than one occasion that this was something that had been planned since the pilot. Creator Matt Groening also notes that they had planned to hold off on using time travel plot lines until the series was better established. Cohen jokes that perhaps they should have explored this plot point earlier however since at the time the episode commentary was recorded it had become clear that the series would be ending. Cohen also thought it was important that the episode explored Fry's option of returning to the past and the question of whether he was happier in the past or in the future.

This episode contains a scene which re-enacts events from the pilot episode, "Space Pilot 3000", after they have been changed by the events of this episode. The episode is so similar to the pilot that the animation director even jokes that the animators charged their time twice for the parts that were taken from the pilot. In actuality, some of Billy West's lines in this episode are taken directly from the voice track for the pilot, specifically Fry's lines as he enters Applied Cryogenics.

== Broadcast and reception ==
IGN ranked the episode as number twenty in their list of the "Top 25 Futurama Episodes" in 2006 because although the episode was not the funniest episode in the series, it had a fun story and was a "great continuation" to "The Day the Earth Stood Stupid".
