= The Day the Earth Stood Stupid =

- Futurama episode
- Episode no.: Season 3 Episode 7
- Directed by: Mark Ervin
- Story by: Jeff Westbrook; David X. Cohen
- Teleplay by: Jeff Westbrook
- Production code: 3ACV07
- Original air date: February 18, 2001

Episode features
- Opening caption: 80% Entertainment By Volume
- Opening cartoon: "Art for Art's Sake" (1934)

Episode chronology
← Previous "Bendless Love"	Next → "That's Lobstertainment!"
- Futurama season 3

"The Day the Earth Stood Stupid" is the seventh episode in the third season of the American animated television series Futurama, and the 39th episode of the series overall. It originally aired on the Fox network in the United States on February 18, 2001. The title of this episode is a play on the title of the 1951 science fiction film, The Day the Earth Stood Still.

== Plot ==
Leela is entering Nibbler in a pet show on Earth. After hearing that the top prize is $500 and a year's supply of dog food, Bender and Zoidberg also enter. After a series of tests, the Hypnotoad wins by hypnotizing the judges. Nibbler is crowned the "dumbest pet in show" while Bender and Zoidberg the "whooping terrier" win second prize, much to Bender's disappointment.

Later, the Planet Express staff discusses an ominous trail of destroyed planets leading toward Earth. Nibbler begins gibbering worriedly and runs away. Tracking Nibbler to an alley, Leela is inexplicably attacked by giant floating brains and sees Nibbler, who has donned a uniform and is piloting a tiny flying saucer as he regretfully prepares to leave Earth. When the brains continue to attack Leela, Nibbler has a change of heart and rescues Leela, letting her on his ship. As they fly away from Earth, Nibbler explains to Leela telepathically that he is a Nibblonian ambassador sent to observe humans in secret.

The next morning, brains start sending blue beams at buildings, and Fry discovers that all the citizens of New New York have been rendered stupid, except himself. Meanwhile, Nibbler and Leela travel to the planet Eternium, at the exact center of the universe. There, in the Hall of Forever, a Nibblonian council tells Leela of the threat of the Brain spawn, the giant brains that have invaded Earth and are attempting to wipe out all thought in the universe. While the Nibblonians have been fighting them since the beginning of the universe, they are powerless against the Brain spawns' powers of stupidity. Fry is the only being in the universe immune to the Brain spawns' mental attack, and is the only one capable of combating them and their leader. They explain to her that once she re-enters the Earth's atmosphere, she will become too dumb to remember, so they write the information on a note and pin it to her clothing.

Leela arrives on Earth to tell Fry of his mission, but he takes the note, blows his nose on it, and throws it into a burning fireplace. Leela has retained just enough of her intelligence to remember the Nibblonians' message. Fry seeks the leader of the brains at the New New York Public Library, reasoning that a leader of big brains would be a big nerd and would go to a library. Fry discovers that thinking hurts the brains, but the brain leader traps Fry and Leela in a mental realm based on Moby-Dick. Fry and Leela pursue the giant brain through The Adventures of Tom Sawyer and gain help from Captain Ahab, Queequeg, and Tom Sawyer, and into Pride and Prejudice. Fry breaks free of the illusion, and quickly writes a story in which he is crushed to death by a bookcase, one riddled with "plot holes and spelling errors". In accordance with the story, the giant brain announces it is leaving Earth "for no raisin" (Fry's misspelling of "reason"), and the people of Earth regain their intelligence. The remaining brains are devoured by the Nibblonians. Other than the Nibblonians, Fry is the only other one to have any recollection of the event, and no one believes his story. Nibbler returns to his undercover position observing Earth as Leela's adorable pet.

== Production ==
Fry's immunity to the Brainspawn's attacks is due to his lack of the Delta brainwave which is revealed in this episode and referred to again in "The Why of Fry". This deficiency is caused by the events of the episode "Roswell That Ends Well" when Fry becomes his own grandfather after having sex with the woman who turns out to be his grandmother. In the DVD commentary for "The Why of Fry", executive producers Matt Groening and David X. Cohen point out that they had intended to give Fry a larger purpose for coming to the future since the pilot episode, but had held off on developing that idea until the fourth season.

This is the first episode featuring the Hypnotoad, whom Matt Groening identifies as his favorite character.

== Broadcast and reception ==
In its original airing this episode was in a three way tie for 78th for the week with a 4.9 rating/9 share. In 2006, IGN ranked the episode as number eighteen in their list of the top 25 episodes of Futurama.
