= Bender Should Not Be Allowed on TV =

- Futurama episode
- Episode no.: Season 4 Episode 6
- Directed by: Ron Hughart
- Written by: Lewis Morton
- Production code: 4ACV06
- Original air date: August 3, 2003

Episode features
- Opening caption: Controlling you through a chip in your butt since 1999
- Opening cartoon: "Much Ado About Mutton" by Famous Studios (1947)

Episode chronology
← Previous "A Taste of Freedom"	Next → "Jurassic Bark"
- Futurama season 4

"Bender Should Not Be Allowed on TV" (also known as "Bender Should Not Be Allowed on Television") is the sixth episode in the fourth season of the American animated television series Futurama, and the 60th episode of the series overall. It originally aired on the Fox network in the United States on August 3, 2003. The episode's plot revolves around Bender's outlandish behavior on the television program All My Circuits; after he lands a spot on the show, he is quickly criticised by members of the public for setting a poor example for children. Bender eventually sees the critics' point of view after he realizes children imitated his behavior and stole his belongings, and sets out to put a stop to his own behavior.

== Plot ==
After a robot actor on All My Circuits malfunctions, an open casting call is held for a replacement. Although the role is that of a child, Bender attends the audition and while the other actors are on, he boos them and chants his own praises through the door. Easily swayed, Calculon gives him the part.

On the air, whilst rebelling against a coma scene scripted to accommodate his poor acting, Bender sings, dances, drinks, smokes, and steals. His behavior boosts the show's ratings; kids, such as Dwight, Cubert, The Cookieville Orphans and Tinny Tim, begin to emulate his on-screen antics. Disgusted by this, Professor Farnsworth and Hermes start a protest group called "Fathers Against Rude Television" (F.A.R.T.).

Dwight and Cubert are desperate to become cool after no one shows up to their joint birthday party, and find that drinking and smoking only make them sick, so they mimic Bender's thieving instead, stealing all of Bender's belongings and using them to throw a party at the Planet Express office. Hermes, Farnsworth, and Bender walk in on the party. Bender is indifferent until he realizes that the things they stole belonged to him. Annoyed that he inspired his own robbery, Bender leads F.A.R.T. in a crusade to get himself off TV. Invading the set, Bender is held at gunpoint by both F.A.R.T. and the network executives to quit the show and shoot the scene, respectively. Bender distracts the network president and Farnsworth and grabs their guns from them. Ordering the cameraman to film, he begins railing against irresponsible behavior on TV, but changes his mind midway through and segues into a speech on parental responsibility which Calculon agrees is good enough to broadcast (provided that stock reaction shots of him are spliced in).

At Planet Express, Farnsworth realizes that sometimes you just need to turn off the TV for a while. However, after browsing through channels and finding nothing good on, they continue to watch when they stop on Everybody Loves Hypnotoad.

== Broadcast and reception ==
In its initial airing, the episode received a Nielsen rating of 2.7/6, placing it 79th among primetime shows for the week of July 28 – August 3, 2003.

The A.V. Club's Zack Handlen gave the episode a B, writing: "There’s some satirical bite in the idea that Bender’s random jackassery would be such an immediate hit, but it’s not really explored. It really only exists so Dwight and Cubert can be inspired to steal Bender’s stuff, which in turn inspires him to join the group (Fathers Against Rude Television) to protest himself. Which has a certain appealing surrealness to it, but nothing in this episode lasts long enough for it to register. Yes, it would’ve been more predictable if we’d spent more time building up Dwight and Cubert, or if Bender had really gotten invested in his television career, but sometimes predictability isn’t a bad thing. The structures that Futurama spends so much time skewering serve a purpose, and while the show doesn’t need to adhere to them unironically, if it’s going to spend so much time tearing them down, it ought to have something to erect in their place."
