= Jurassic Bark =

- Futurama episode
- Episode no.: Season 4 Episode 7
- Directed by: Swinton O. Scott III
- Written by: Eric Kaplan
- Production code: 4ACV07
- Original air date: November 17, 2002

Episode features
- Opening caption: Not Affiliated With Futurama Brass Knuckle Co.
- Opening cartoon: "Hiss and Make Up" from Merrie Melodies by Warner Bros. Cartoons (1943)

Episode chronology
| ← Previous "Bender Should Not Be Allowed on TV" | Next → "Crimes of the Hot" |
- Futurama season 4

"Jurassic Bark" is the seventh episode in the fourth season of the American animated television series Futurama, and the 61st episode of the series overall. It first aired on the Fox network in the United States on November 17, 2002. The plot revolves around Fry, who finds a fossilized version of his dog Seymour from before he was frozen. Fry seeks to have his pet brought back to life. The episode was nominated for an Emmy Award but lost to The Simpsons episode "Three Gays of the Condo".

== Plot ==
When Fry takes Bender to a museum exhibit, he is shocked to find a fossilized dog on display, which he recognizes as his pet from the 20th century, Seymour Asses. For three days, he protests in front of the museum by dancing to "The Hustle" by Van McCoy, demanding they give him Seymour's body, which proves successful. Professor Farnsworth then examines Seymour's body, and concludes that, due to his unusually rapid fossilization, a DNA sample can be made to produce a clone, and it would even be possible to recreate Seymour's personality and memory.

Fry begins to prepare for the dog, and Bender becomes jealous. Just when the Professor is ready to clone Seymour, Bender arrives. Angry that Fry will not spend time with him, he grabs the fossil and throws it in a pit of lava, believing that destroying it will restore his friendship with Fry. Fry is furious at Bender and upset at having lost Seymour. Bender realizes how Fry could love an inferior creature and apologizes for what he did. The professor explains that the fossil may not have instantly melted, as it was made of dolomite. With this in mind, Bender, claiming to be partly made from dolomite, dives into the lava and recovers the fossil.

The Professor begins the cloning process, and his computer informs him that Seymour died at the age of 15, meaning he lived twelve years after Fry was frozen. Fry has a change of heart and aborts the cloning process, believing that Seymour must have moved on with his life, found a new owner, and forgotten about him. A flashback then shows that, contrary to Fry's assumption, Seymour faithfully obeyed his last command, waiting in front of Panucci's Pizza for Fry to return. (Note: Seymour's fate was later revealed in Futurama: Bender's Big Score.)

== Production ==
According to the DVD commentary, the last part of the episode where Seymour is waiting outside on the sidewalk was originally set to "Gayane's Adagio" from Aram Khachaturian's Gayane ballet suite, famously used in the sequence introducing the Discovery spacecraft in 2001: A Space Odyssey, but was replaced with the song "I Will Wait for You" from The Umbrellas of Cherbourg as sung by Connie Francis, which writer Eric Kaplan's grandparents sang and played on the piano while he was a child.

Also, according to the DVD commentary, the original idea for the episode was to have Fry's mother fossilized instead of Seymour, but this idea was scrapped after it was thought to be too upsetting to the audience. Before settling on a dog, Fry's father being fossilized was also discussed, but it too was scrapped for the same reason.

== Continuity ==
When Fry delivers the pizza to the cryogenic lab, he discovers that once again he is tricked by a prank pizza delivery. As he throws the pizza box on the desk in disgust, Nibbler's eye stalk can be seen peeping up through trash in the wastebasket. Soon after, as Fry's chair and noisemaker hit the ground, Nibbler's shadow is visible when the floor is shown, along with Fry's shadow next to him.

Executive producer David X. Cohen states in the commentary for "The Why of Fry" that these shots were included in order to foreshadow the events of that episode.

Bender's Big Score, produced five years after "Jurassic Bark", revisits Seymour, and puts the closing scene of the episode in a much happier context. A time-traveling duplicate of Fry arrives in the year 2000 and reunites with Seymour, caring for him until 2012 when Bender blows up Fry's apartment; the blast kills and fossilizes the dog.

== Reception ==
The episode received universal acclaim. In its initial airing, the episode received a Nielsen rating of 4.2/5, placing it 93rd among primetime shows for the week of November 11–17, 2002. The episode was nominated for the 2003 Emmy Award for Outstanding Animated Program (For Programming Less than One Hour) but lost to The Simpsons episode "Three Gays of the Condo".

In 2006, IGN ranked this episode No. 7 in their list of the top 25 Futurama episodes, with critic Dan Iverson remarking that the climax was "one of the saddest endings to a television program that I have ever seen". In 2013, fans voted "Jurassic Bark" as the No. 1 episode of Futurama during the "Fanarama" marathon. In 2018, Paste ranked it third in their list of the top 50 Futurama episodes. In 2017, NME included it in a list of the series' ten best episodes. In 2019, Nerdist included it in a list of the show's eleven best episodes. The episode topped Variety's 2022 list of "Top 10 'Futurama' Episodes, Ranked", with author Katcy Stephan calling the episode "the series' most heartbreaking".

Zack Handlen of The A.V. Club gave the episode an 'A' rating, and noted how "the last minute or two [...] remains one of the most gutting scenes [he'd] ever watched on television". Alison Willmore, writing for IndieWire in 2013, said that the episode was capable of reducing even the most "animation-averse" viewer to tears. Scott Meslow, writing for GQ in 2018, called the episode "legendarily gut-punching" and likely to "reduce any non-sociopath to sobbing."

== See also ==
- List of individual dogs § Faithful after master's death
  - Argos – Odysseus' faithful dog in The Odyssey who waited twenty years to see his master again
  - Fido – an Italian street dog who waited for his master, who was killed in a World War II bombing, to come home on the bus for fourteen years until his death
  - Hachikō – a real-life dog who waited at a train station for his dead master for nine years
  - Greyfriars Bobby – another real-life dog who stayed by his master's grave for fourteen years
  - Loyalty – a monument dedicated to a real-life dog named "Kostya", who stayed at the spot of a car accident which killed his owners for seven years
  - Shep – a real-life dog whose master's casket was taken away by train; Shep met every train for five and a half years until his death
- "The Luck of the Fryrish" and "Game of Tones" – Futurama episodes with similar themes
