= Philip J. Fry =

Futurama character

- Futurama character
- First appearance: "Space Pilot 3000" (1999)
- Created by: Matt Groening; David X. Cohen
- Designed by: Matt Groening
- Voiced by: Billy West

In-universe information
- Full name: Philip J. Fry
- Aliases: Lars Fillmore; Captain Yesterday; Emperor Fry the Solid; Meatbag; Chump; Orange Joe; Fry
- Species: Human
- Gender: Male
- Occupation: Executive delivery boy (as of "Law and Oracle"); Soldier (formerly); Police officer (formerly); Slave (formerly); Superhero (formerly); Emperor of Trisol (formerly)
- Family: Yancy Fry Sr. (father/son); Mrs. Fry (mother); Yancy Fry Jr. (brother); Mildred Fry (paternal grandmother); Enos Fry (original paternal grandfather); Philip J. Fry (self/current paternal grandfather); Mrs. and Mr. Gleisner (maternal grandparents); Yancy Fry Jr.'s unnamed wife (sister-in-law); Philip J. Fry II (nephew); Yancy Fry (great-grandfather)
- Significant others: Turanga Leela (fiancée and later wife)
- Relatives: Hubert J. Farnsworth (distant nephew); Cubert Farnsworth (clone of Professor Farnsworth); Igner (distant nephew); Turanga Morris (father-in-law); Turanga Munda (mother-in-law); Munda's mother (grandmother-in-law)
- Nationality: American
- Born: August 14, 1974; New York City, U.S.

Philip J. Fry, commonly known mononymously by his surname Fry, is a fictional character and the protagonist of the animated series Futurama. He is voiced by Billy West using a version of his own voice as he sounded when he was 25. He is a delivery boy from the 20th century who becomes cryogenically frozen and reawakens in the 30th century to become a delivery boy there with an intergalactic delivery company run by his 30th great-grandnephew, Professor Hubert J. Farnsworth. He is the best friend and roommate of Bender and the boyfriend and later fiancé of Leela.

== Character overview ==
Fry was born on August 14, 1974 in New York City. He is a pizza delivery boy who, during the first few seconds of 2000, falls into a cryogenic tank while delivering a pizza to Applied Cryogenics. He remains frozen until the last day of 2999. He then meets the one-eyed cryogenics counselor Leela, as well as the cigar-smoking, alcoholic, kleptomaniac robot Bender. Together, they are employed by Fry's distant nephew, the senile and demented old scientist Professor Farnsworth, as the crew of his delivery company Planet Express.

Fry's parents are Yancy Fry Sr., a strict Republican who believes in conspiracy theories, and Mrs. Fry (née Gleisner), an avid New York Mets fan. It was later revealed that Fry's family on his father's side is from New Mexico. Fry had an older brother named Yancy; a dog named Seymour; and an ex-girlfriend named Michelle Jenkins (who dumps him in the first episode, "Space Pilot 3000", just before he is frozen). Fry had a lifelong sibling rivalry with his older brother Yancy, due to Fry's perception that Yancy steals everything from him and vice versa; in "The Luck of the Fryrish", however, it is revealed his brother loved him dearly, and later named his son after him.

After dropping out of Coney Island Community College, Fry got a job as a delivery boy at Panucci's Pizza. Depictions of Fry's family in early episodes showed them as extremely dysfunctional, with an inattentive mother and borderline-abusive father. Later seasons, however, depicted them as much closer and, while still dysfunctional, more loving and attentive, with Fry's father treating him harshly to ensure he grew up tough.

=== Personality and abilities ===
Fry is characterized as lazy, gullible, and none-too-bright, but also innocent, playful and kind-hearted. Fry regards the robot Bender as his closest friend, despite the latter's mean-spirited, selfish nature and constant abuse. He also has strong feelings for Leela, but has difficulty properly articulating his emotions to her. Throughout the early seasons of the show, Leela is shown to have feelings for Fry that she is reluctant to act on due to his immaturity. It isn't until the movie Into the Wild Green Yonder that she admits to loving him back. At the end of that film, they are seen sharing a kiss as they enter a wormhole, and subsequently begin dating.

Despite his below-average intelligence, Fry has a soft and tender heart, frequently going the extra mile to help his friends, even if he is oblivious to their problems. Fry has a strong sense of justice and is far from afraid of standing up for himself and his friends and family. He has shown remarkable skill playing video games, (even mastering the 31st-century's version on the Internet), and in "Bender Should Not Be Allowed on TV" is seen successfully playing a game despite not looking at the screen. This skill carries over to using Planet Express Ship's laser gun.

Owing to these elements of his personality, Fry also exhibits remarkable bravery and self-sacrifice on occasion and has even displayed flashes of intuition. He has even proved to be a competent fighter in "Law and Oracle" and "Fun on a Bun", the latter episode showing that Fry is skilled enough to hold his own against Leela in direct physical combat. He has also survived a heart attack intentionally caused by Bender.

In the episode "The Why of Fry", Leela's seemingly oblivious pet Nibbler reveals himself as the reason for Fry's freezing. Due to a time-travel incident in "Roswell That Ends Well", Fry became his own grandfather, but this genetic defect also means that Fry lacks the Delta brainwave that enables conscious thought, his mind instead consisting of an apparently random assortment of other waves that function as a working mind (Leela compared it to a dress made out of carpet remnants). As a result of this defect, Fry can withstand the intellect-draining onslaught of the evil Brainspawn and is immune to the Dark One's mind-reading in Into the Wild Green Yonder as well as the mind-controlling power of the Hypnotoad.

Due to this quirk, Nibbler's race, the Nibblonians, dub him "The Mighty One". Through prediction (on the eve of 1999, as the Nibblonians lack the ability to travel through time), they guessed that Fry would be the one to save the world from the evil Brainspawn. Because his natural lifespan would not extend to the right millennium, however, Nibbler is sent to make the aforementioned delivery call to push an unsuspecting Fry into the cryogenic tube, to re-emerge December 31, 2999. When Fry learned of this, he briefly allowed the Brainspawn to send him back in time to stop Nibbler from sending him to the future, but after confirming that Nibbler hadn't come back in time and was acting only to protect the future, Fry chose to let his past self fall into the tube to preserve the timeline.

In several episodes, he feels nostalgic for the 20th century and attempts to convince his coworkers of the greatness of the century.

=== Love life ===
==== Leela ====
Leela is Fry's main love interest and later wife. His love for her is a major plotline throughout the series. Fry first begins to show a serious interest in her from the second season onwards, although she constantly turns him down for dates due to his immaturity, although she says that she loves his boyish charm. Leela initially sees Fry as a friend and nothing more, but deeper affection for him appears occasionally, such as on the numerous occasions when he risks his life for hers ("Love and Rocket", "The Sting", "Lrrreconcilable Ndndifferences").

Fry's feelings for Leela are openly displayed throughout the series. In "The Sting", Fry throws himself in front of a baby Queen Bee to protect Leela, resulting in the bee's stinger completely penetrating his torso. In "Love and Rocket", upon noticing that Leela's oxygen tank was running on "critical", he attaches her oxygen tube to his tank, giving her his oxygen and almost asphyxiating himself. In "Parasites Lost", Fry becomes infected with symbiotic "worms" which enhance his muscles and intelligence, allowing him to attract Leela's romantic attention. However, fearing that Leela was attracted to him only for his worms, he rids himself of them in a failed bid to begin a genuine relationship. In "Time Keeps on Slippin'", Fry moves the stars to write a love note to Leela, but the message is blown up before she can read it. In the final episode of the initial run, "The Devil's Hands are Idle Playthings", Fry trades hands with the Robot Devil in order to compose an opera about Leela in which they fall in love. When Fry returns the Robot Devil's hands to prevent him from forcing Leela to marry him, the opera deteriorates, causing the audience to leave. Fry sadly walks off the stage. Leela is the only one who remains behind, asking Fry not to stop because she wants to hear how it ends. He picks up his holophonor and composes a crude ending in which the stage-Fry and stage-Leela share a single kiss.

In the film Futurama: Bender's Big Score (later divided into three episodes), Leela falls in love with a seemingly perfect man, Lars, and they soon become engaged. However, Lars leaves Leela on her wedding day explaining later that as a time paradox he is doomed, and so he dumps her.Through this, he then reveals that he is in fact the time paradox duplicate of Fry, who had undergone physical changes due to an explosion and become more mature through 12 years of age and experience.

At the end of the film Futurama: Into the Wild Green Yonder (also later divided into three episodes), Leela openly admits to loving Fry, and they commence an openly romantic relationship from the episode "Rebirth" onwards. In "The Prisoner of Benda" they have "sex", albeit with their minds in different bodies.

The on-again, off-again nature of their relationship causes Leela to leave Planet Express and Fry in "Overclockwise", however by the end of the episode, Leela returns to Planet Express and seemingly reunites with Fry. Bender reveals to both Fry and Leela their "ultimate fate" that he learned while he was overclocked. The audience is never shown the contents, but through their facial expressions, it is clear that while the journey for them may be bumpy, Fry and Leela will ultimately end up happy.

In later episodes, such as "The Butterjunk Effect" and "Fun on a Bun", Fry and Leela are shown to be in a relationship, though the events of the series precipitate frequent arguments and breakups. These issues are usually resolved within the episode, leaving Fry and Leela still together at the end.

During the season finale "Meanwhile", Fry decides that it is time for him to propose to Leela. Wanting the moment of his proposal to last longer, he steals Professor Farnsworth's time machine remote that turns back time every 10 seconds. When Leela is late, he thinks she has rejected him and attempts suicide by jumping off the building; he sees her arriving just in time, however, and presses the reset button over and over again to keep from hitting the ground. He accidentally breaks the remote and freezes time, leaving himself and Leela as the only unfrozen beings in the universe. Leela accepts Fry's proposal, and they have a long, happy unofficial "marriage". After spending decades traveling the world, they return to the spot where Fry was planning to propose. As they toast to their life together, the Professor shows up and repairs the time machine but informs them it will reset their lives to the moment before he invented the machine, leaving them with no memory of the life they spent together. Fry asks Leela if she wants to go around again with him, and she replies that she does.

The first part of the eighth season, picking up ten years after time was frozen, shows a young-again Fry and Leela continuing their relationship.

==== Michelle Jenkins ====
Michelle Jenkins (voiced by Kath Soucie in the first appearance, Sarah Silverman in the second appearance) is Fry's on-and-off ex-girlfriend from the 20th century. Shortly before Fry is frozen, she dumps him for a man named Constantine (called Charles in "The Cryonic Woman"), whom she later marries. They eventually split up, and she decides to freeze herself to try again in the distant future. She wakes up in 3002, meets Fry again, and restarts her relationship with him. However, she fails to fit into the 31st-century life to which Fry has become so accustomed, and so asks him to freeze himself with her for another thousand years. This plan fails, as does the rekindled relationship, so Fry leaves her. She later is shown in a limousine with the recently unfrozen Pauly Shore. In the episode "Proposition Infinity", she is again shown with Pauly Shore, and the implication is that they are now married.

==== Amy Kroker (née Wong) ====
During a trip on the luxury starliner Titanic, Amy Wong passes Fry off as her boyfriend to avoid being set up by her parents with an unattractive potential husband. Unfortunately, Leela was also passing Fry off as her fiancé to ward off the attentions of Zapp Brannigan. Potential embarrassment is averted by catastrophic damage to the ship, and Amy wins the battle of the bogus boyfriends.

In "Put Your Head on My Shoulders", Fry and Amy are trapped together in a desert on Mercury and realize they have a lot in common. While being towed to the nearest gas station to refuel, they have sex in the car. They continue the relationship back home, but Fry intends to end it the day before Valentine's Day because he feels that they are spending too much time together. An accident ends with Fry's head being temporarily attached to Amy's body, causing much tension due to Fry's decision to break up and Amy's subsequent date, forcing Leela to step in and distract Amy's date to save Fry from an awkward situation. Despite their break-up, they remain good friends.

==== Morgan Proctor ====
In "How Hermes Requisitioned His Groove Back", while Hermes was on forced paid leave, Fry had a secret affair with his temporary replacement, Morgan Proctor, due to her fetish for messy men. She informed Fry that no one could know about them, and she'd deny any mention of it. Fry and Morgan's affair ended when Bender caught them, leading her to deprogram Bender so Fry ended their affair.

==== Umbriel ====
In "The Deep South" after the Planet Express crew discovers the mythical underwater city of Atlanta, Fry starts dating a mermaid named Umbriel. After she shows him the wonders of the deep sea, he decides to stay with her, but changes his mind when he learns how merpeople have sex.

==== Mildred Fry ====
After an accident with a microwave caused the crew and the professor to be thrown back into time, Fry meets his paternal grandparents in the year 1947 on the Roswell, New Mexico air force base. After realizing that his existence depends on his paternal grandparents having children, Fry tries to protect his grandfather by locking him into an abandoned house in the desert. Unfortunately, the house was a test site for a nuclear bomb which killed his paternal grandfather. After realizing he was still alive after his paternal grandfather died, he decides that Mildred can't be his paternal grandmother and has sex with her after she seduces him. However, Professor then points out that the reason why he was still alive because Fry had become his own grandfather by impregnating Mildred, who really is his paternal grandmother. Fry was distressed after he realizes that he is now the father of his own father. In many episodes, he has a different reaction to the encounter being either proud or disturbed.

==== Colleen O'Hallahan ====
During the events of "Futurama: The Beast with a Billion Backs" Fry meets police chief Colleen O'Hallahan while observing the tear in the universe and soon begin dating. Their relationship is happy and serious, which makes Leela jealous as she finally came to return Fry's feelings. When Fry agrees to move in with Colleen, he learns that she has four other live-in boyfriends. Failing to adjust to her polyandrous marriage he breaks up with her, leaving himself heartbroken. His sadness at losing Colleen leads him to travel into the tear where he meets the alien Yivo who he introduces to the rest of the universe, and the whole universe all come to fall in love with Yivo. Eventually, Yivo later breaks up with the whole universe except Colleen as they are unable to find satisfaction being in love with a single person so they understand each other. Before she moves in permanently with Yivo, Colleen thanks Fry for introducing her to Yivo as the tear closes forever.

== Family relationships ==
=== Professor Farnsworth ===
Professor Hubert Farnsworth is the distant nephew of Philip J. Fry and his only living family member in the 31st century, aside from Cubert, the Professor's clone, and Igner, the Professor's illegitimate son by the industrialist Mom . The Professor runs an intergalactic delivery service to fund his scientific research, and gives Fry, Leela, and Bender jobs. Although the professor is an accomplished scientist and inventor, he is also an amoral crackpot who shows distinct signs of senility. As of the episode "A Clone of My Own", he is 160 years old.

=== Cubert Farnsworth ===
Cubert is the young clone of the professor and is often portrayed as his son. He was created as an heir to all of the professor's research, but was kept in the tube too long resulting in a pressed in nose. He often gets into trouble and makes fun of Fry for being dumb. He is also good friends with Dwight Conrad, the son of Hermes.

=== Igner ===
Igner is the son of the professor and Mom. He was raised by Mom and neither he nor the professor knew who the father was. His father wasn't revealed until Bender's Game.

=== Mildred ===
Mildred was the grandmother of Fry. During his time in the past, due to an incident with the microwave, Fry accidentally kills his grandfather by locking him in a cabin located in a nuclear test site and returns to Mildred who seduces him after Fry decides that she couldn't possibly be his real grandmother because he was still alive. The professor, Leela, and Bender then find Fry in bed with Mildred and point out that because Fry was still alive after his grandfather's death, he had become his own grandfather and that he had still slept with his own grandmother.

=== Yancy Fry Sr. ===
Yancy Senior is the father of Yancy Fry Jr. and Philip J. Fry. He is a large man who is often seen in flashbacks preparing against the "commie invasion" or the Y2K apocalypse. He and his wife often express how much they miss Fry after his disappearance despite numerous flashbacks where they are seen making light of it or suggesting that they made little effort to find him. Fry later traveled back in time and impregnated his grandmother, making him the father of his own father.

=== Mrs. Fry ===
Fry's mother. Fry and his mother seemed to have had a better relationship. Although she often joins in on the jokes about his disappearance, she has expressed sadness over his loss and is able to tell him how much she loved him when Nibbler allows Fry to enter into her dreams and say goodbye.

=== Yancy Fry Jr. and Philip J. Fry II ===
Yancy Jr. is Fry's older brother. Yancy and Philip had an intense sibling rivalry over basketball, dancing, and various other activities. During this time, Fry found a lucky seven-leaf clover that seems to bring him an incredible amount of raw talent at whatever he does. Yancy and Philip are constantly fighting over the clover until Fry decides to hide it in an old record vault. After Fry's disappearance, Yancy breaks into the vault to find music he can use at his wedding reception and finds the clover. Yancy ends up giving the clover to his son Philip who he named after his uncle. Fry eventually sees a picture of his nephew, who was the first person on Mars, in the future and believes that it was Yancy Jr. who had stolen his name and his dream of going into space (which the gang points out Fry does every day now). Fry eventually finds Philip's grave and decides to rob it in an effort to take back the clover. He has a horrible realization that the grave he was robbing was that of his nephew and not his brother when he clears the headstone and it reads "Here lies Philip J. Fry. Named for his uncle to carry on his spirit." Fry then places the clover back into the grave and leaves his nephew's grave, realizing how much his brother loved and missed him.

Fry's nephew appears in person during Bender's Big Score. Bender travels back in time to the year 2012, intent on assassinating Fry. He encounters a young boy who shares Fry's name and prepares to kill him, but stops when the boy says that Fry is his uncle.

== Production ==
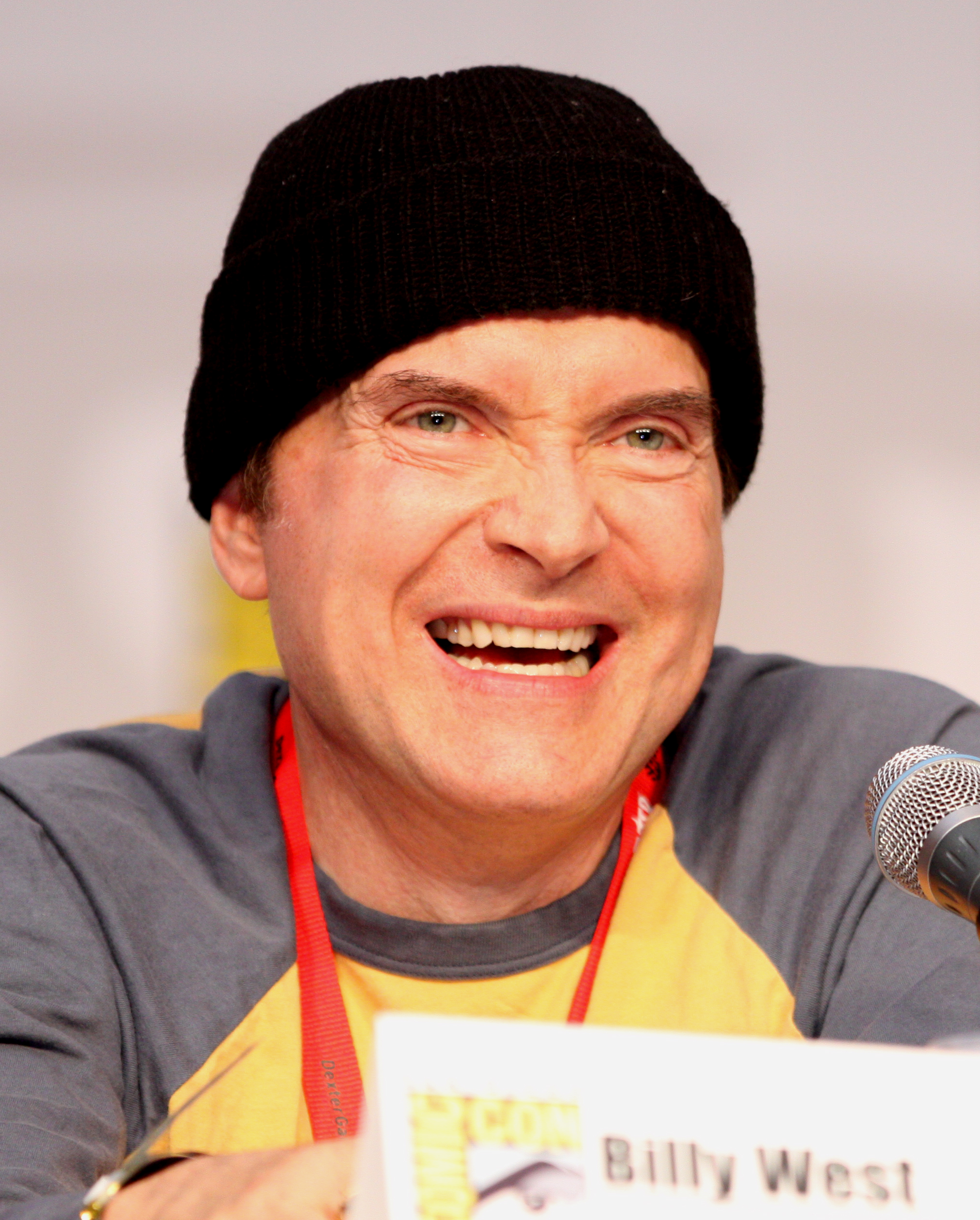
Billy West provides the voice of Fry.

Although Billy West stated in an interview that the name "Philip" was given to Fry by Matt Groening as a homage to the late Phil Hartman, for whom the role of Zapp Brannigan was created, Groening said during the 2013 Futurama panel at San Diego Comic-Con that Fry was in fact named after Groening's father, Homer Philip Groening, who was also the namesake for Homer Simpson.

According to Groening, Fry's character developed over time while still keeping his qualities as a loser and the characteristics which writers hoped would make him appeal to the target young male audience. Fry's character is essentially a bungling, stubborn slob with a heart of gold who cannot get ahead in the world, but still has a slight glimmer of hope. Fry's trademark outfit – a red windbreaker jacket, white t-shirt and blue jeans – is based on James Dean's outfit from Rebel Without a Cause.

Fry is voiced by Billy West, who also voices Doctor Zoidberg, Hubert J. Farnsworth and various other characters in the series. Although West auditioned for the part, it was originally given to Charlie Schlatter; however, after a casting change, West was offered the job. The voice West uses for Fry has been described as that of a "generic Saturday-morning good guy". Other actors who auditioned for Fry include Ryan Stiles and Rob Paulsen. West admits that he intentionally made Fry's sound similar to his own, claiming that keeping the "cartoony" aspects out of it would make it harder for someone else to imitate the same voice. He notes that the voice is higher than his own and that he tried to duplicate the voice he had at age 25, which he describes as "this whiny, complaining voice — this plain vanilla voice". West also voices Lars Fillmore in Futurama: Bender's Big Score, who is a time travel duplicate of Fry with an injured larynx, and therefore, a slightly altered voice. The producers initially considered having a different voice actor do Lars' voice in order to keep viewers from guessing his true identity, but ultimately decided it would not make sense if anyone besides West did the voice.
