= Futurama season 3 =

3rd season of Futurama

Futurama
- Season 3
- DVD cover for the 2012 re-release of Volume Three, featuring Professor Farnsworth
- Showrunner: David X. Cohen
- No. of episodes: 22

Release
- Original network: Fox
- Original release: January 21, 2001 – December 8, 2002

Season chronology
- ← Previous; Season 2 Next → Season 4

The third season of Futurama began airing on January 21, 2001 and concluded after 22 episodes on December 8, 2002. The entire season is included within the Volume Three DVD box set, which was released on March 9, 2004.

The complete 22 episodes of the season have been released on a box set called Futurama: Volume Three, on DVD and VHS. It was first released in Region 2 on June 2, 2003, with releases in other regions following in 2003 and 2004 and is based in 3003 and 3004. The season was re-released as Futurama: Volume 3, with entirely different packaging to match the newer season releases on July 17, 2012.

== Cast and characters ==
=== Regular ===
- Billy West as Philip J. Fry, Professor Farnsworth, Zoidberg, Zapp Brannigan, Smitty, Judge Ron Whitey, Leo Wong, R.J., Singing Wind, Richard Nixon's Head, Gus
- Katey Sagal as Turanga Leela
- John DiMaggio as Bender, Sal, Robot Santa, URL, Yancy Fry, Sr., The Noticeably F.A.T. , Joey Mousepad, Flexo, Elzar, Igner, Norm, Frankie, Curly Joe, Randy
- Tress MacNeille as Kug, Thog, Ornik, Linda, Petunia, Vyolet, Mrs. Fry, Nurse Ratchet, Brett Blob, Blecch’s Wife, Ndnd, Mom, Hattie MacDoogal
- Maurice LaMarche as Morbo, The Hyperchicken, The Robot Devil, Donbot, Clamps, Big Brain, Walt, Dr. Perceptron, Victor, H.G. Blob, Blecch, Lrrr, Calculon, Dandy Jim
- Lauren Tom as Amy Wong, Inez Wong
- Phil LaMarr as Hermes Conrad, Joe, Unit 2013, Dwight Conrad, Bubblegum Tate, Preacherbot
- David Herman as Scruffy, Mayor Poopenmeyer, Hair Robot, Warden Vogel, Larry, Roberto, Malfunctioning Eddie, Mad Hatter Robot, Clyde Dixon, Dr. Wernstrom, Colin Pac-Man, Steve Castle

=== Recurring ===
- Dawnn Lewis as LaBarbara Conrad
- Kath Soucie as Cubert Farnsworth, Albert, Nina
- Frank Welker as Nibbler
- Nicole St. John as Sally

=== Special guest stars ===
- Bea Arthur as the Femputer
- Coolio as Kwanzaabot
- Tom Kenny as Yancy Fry Jr., Andy Goldman, Adlai Atkins, Abner Doubledeal
- Phil Hendrie as Free Waterfall Sr., Old Man Waterfall
- Jan Hooks as Angleyne
- Hank Azaria as Harold Zoid
- Beck as himself
- Lucy Liu as herself
- Hank Aaron as himself
- Bob Uecker as himself

== Episodes ==
No. overall	No. in season	Title	Directed by	Written by	Original release date	Prod. code	U.S. viewers (millions)
33	1	"Amazon Women in the Mood"	Brian Sheesley	Lewis Morton	February 4, 2001	3ACV01	8.18
A double-date for Kif, Amy, Zapp, and Leela ends in disaster when their orbiting restaurant crashes on planet Amazonia. The hulking female inhabitants of the planet take their male captives to the omniscient Femputer, who orders Fry, Zapp, and Kif to death by "snu-snu" (sex).
34	2	"Parasites Lost"	Peter Avanzino	Eric Kaplan	January 21, 2001	3ACV02	8.35
When Fry becomes infested with parasitic worms that make him stronger and smarter, he finally finds the perfect way to profess his feelings to Leela. Meanwhile, the rest of the crew goes on a Fantastic Voyage-esque journey into Fry's body to eradicate the worms.
35	3	"A Tale of Two Santas"	Ron Hughart	Bill Odenkirk	December 23, 2001	3ACV03	7.29
A Planet Express mission to Robot Santa's colony on Neptune leaves the murderous robot trapped in the frozen sea, and Bender takes over as Santa, vowing to bring peace and goodwill to Xmas again. But when Bender is mistaken for the real Robot Santa, he is arrested and sentenced to death.
36	4	"The Luck of the Fryrish"	Chris Loudon	Ron Weiner	March 11, 2001	3ACV04	7.80
After suffering a string of bad luck, Fry searches the ancient ruins of Old New York for his beloved lucky clover...only to conclude that his older brother stole not only his clover – but his life.
37	5	"The Birdbot of Ice-Catraz"	James Purdum	Dan Vebber	March 4, 2001	3ACV05	7.92
A sober Bender crashes a dark matter tanker on Pluto, threatening the penguin reserve nearby. Leela helps out in the cleanup, but when the penguins begin mating out of control, drastic action must be taken to thin the herd. Meanwhile, Bender loses his memory and becomes a penguin.
38	6	"Bendless Love"	Swinton O. Scott III	Eric Horsted	February 11, 2001	3ACV06	8.20
Bender's urge to bend prompts Professor Farnsworth to send him to work as a scab in a steel factory during a labor strike, where he falls in love with a shapely fem-bot named Angleyne (voiced by Jan Hooks). But Bender's old rival Flexo and the intrusion of the Robot Mafia threaten to throw a wrench into the proceedings.
39	7	"The Day the Earth Stood Stupid"	Mark Ervin	Story by : Jeff Westbrook & David X. Cohen; Teleplay by : Jeff Westbrook	February 18, 2001	3ACV07	8.29
Earth is invaded by super-intelligent flying brains, who sap the Earth's populace of their intelligence. Leela is taken to Nibbler's home planet Eternium, where the Nibblonians explain that only one human is immune to the brains' powers – Fry.
40	8	"That's Lobstertainment!"	Bret Haaland	Patric M. Verrone	February 25, 2001	3ACV08	8.06
Dr. Zoidberg reunites with his uncle, silent hologram star Harold Zoid, and the two of them set out to make a movie together. They cast the temperamental Calculon in the lead role, who demands an Oscar for his performance, but the movie doesn't go over well with audiences. Meanwhile, Fry and Leela get stuck in the Planet Express ship as it sinks into a tar pit on the night of the movie's premiere.
41	9	"The Cyber House Rules"	Susie Dietter	Lewis Morton	April 1, 2001	3ACV09	6.37
Leela meets up with her former orphanarium playmate Adlai Atkins, now a plastic surgeon, who agrees to grant Leela surgery that will give her two eyes. Meanwhile, Bender adopts twelve orphans in order to collect $1200 in government stipends.
42	10	"Where the Buggalo Roam"	Patty Shinagawa	J. Stewart Burns	March 3, 2002	3ACV10	7.61
When Amy's parents' ranch is hit by a dust storm that blows away their herd of buggalo (oversized ladybugs that are treated like and have the characteristics of cattle and buffalo), Kif sets out to prove his masculinity by rounding up the herd, only to become entangled with the native Martians.
43	11	"Insane in the Mainframe"	Peter Avanzino	Bill Odenkirk	April 8, 2001	3ACV11	7.57
Fry and Bender are sentenced to time in an insane asylum for robots after Bender's old, psychotic criminal friend, Roberto, frames them for bank robbery. When Roberto ropes Bender into escaping the asylum and robbing the bank again, Fry actually goes insane and believes he's a robot after the asylum staff dismisses his claims that he's human and the Planet Express crew refuses to help him due to political pressure from the governor.
44	12	"The Route of All Evil"	Brian Sheesley	Dan Vebber	December 8, 2002	3ACV12	4.21
Farnsworth's clone Cubert teams up with Hermes' son Dwight to launch a newspaper delivery business. Farnsworth and Hermes scoff at the kids' efforts – until the delivery boys accumulate enough capital to buy out Planet Express. Meanwhile, Fry and Leela use Bender to brew their own homemade beer and treat the brewing as if Bender is a pregnant mother.
45	13	"Bendin' in the Wind"	Ron Hughart	Eric Horsted	April 22, 2001	3ACV13	6.04
When Bender is paralyzed in a tragic can opener accident, he discovers his musical washboard skills and goes on tour as a member of Beck's folk-rock band, acting as a voice for broken robots everywhere. Fry, Leela, Amy, and Zoidberg tag along in Fry's antique 1960s VW Van.
46	14	"Time Keeps On Slippin'"	Chris Loudon	Ken Keeler	May 6, 2001	3ACV14	6.51
While creating a team of mutants to play the Harlem Globetrotters, the Professor accidentally causes a disruption in time that threatens the existence of the universe. Meanwhile, Fry tries to win an unreceptive Leela's heart.
47	15	"I Dated a Robot"	James Purdum	Eric Kaplan	May 13, 2001	3ACV15	6.06
Fry discovers the ability to download any celebrity onto a blank robot, and chooses to download Lucy Liu, with whom he falls madly in love. Repulsed by this disgusting display of human/robot love, Leela, Bender, and Zoidberg set out to shut down Nappster.com and put an end to illegal celebrity downloads forever.
48	16	"A Leela of Her Own"	Swinton O. Scott III	Patric M. Verrone	April 7, 2002	3ACV16	4.99
Leela endeavors to become the first female blernsball player, but her lack of depth perception hinders her skills. Nevertheless, she becomes the pitcher for the New New York Mets, purely for her novelty value.
49	17	"A Pharaoh to Remember"	Mark Ervin	Ron Weiner	March 10, 2002	3ACV17	6.13
Bender fears that nobody will remember him after he dies, and sees his chance for immortality when the crew visits Osiris 4, a planet with a civilization similar to Ancient Egypt, and he poses as the planet's new pharaoh.
50	18	"Anthology of Interest II"	Bret Haaland	Lewis Morton	January 6, 2002	3ACV18	7.74
50	18	"Anthology of Interest II"	Bret Haaland	David X. Cohen	January 6, 2002	3ACV18	7.74
50	18	"Anthology of Interest II"	Bret Haaland	Jason Gorbett & Scott Kirby	January 6, 2002	3ACV18	7.74
The Planet Express crew ask three more questions for the What-If Machine: Bender asks what if he were human; Fry asks what if life were more like a video game; and Leela asks what if she found her true home. I, Meatbag – Farnsworth uses his latest invention to turn Bender into a human for the Nobel Committee. Bender goes on a week-long eating binge that turns him into a thousand-pound, morbidly obese blob and dies shortly after inspiring the committee to become party animals like he had. Raiders of the Lost Arcade – Earth is invaded by a race of aliens from Nintendu 64 in a manner similar to Space Invaders. Fry fails to stop the Nintendian invasion, but when their demands are revealed to be quarters for laundry, a compromise is reached allowing the Nintendians to mix their laundry with the Earthlings' in exchange for the Earth's safety. Wizzin' – Instead of seeing what would happen if she found her true home, Leela is knocked unconscious by the What-If Machine's lever and dreams herself in a parody of The Wizard of Oz with herself as Dorothy, Fry as the Scarecrow, Bender as the Tin Man, Zoidberg as the Cowardly Lion, Farnsworth as the Wizard, and Mom as the Wicked Witch. Leela decides she wants to become the new Wicked Witch instead of going home, but her reign of terror and her dream are cut short when Zoidberg splashes and melts her with water.
51	19	"Roswell That Ends Well"	Rich Moore	J. Stewart Burns	December 9, 2001	3ACV19	5.40
Fry puts a metal popcorn pan in the microwave while a supernova occurs nearby, causing the radiation of both to rip open a time portal that sends the Planet Express crew back in time to Roswell, New Mexico in the year 1947. Bender's body is broken to pieces during the crash and Zoidberg is found by the U.S. military among the debris, and both are taken to Area 51 for experimentation. The crew requires another microwave to return to the 31st century, so they try to retrieve one without altering history. Meanwhile, Fry meets his grandfather Enos and begins fearing that he will cease to exist if his grandfather is killed. While trying to save him, however, Fry accidentally brings about Enos' death when he takes him to a house which turns out to be in the middle of a nuclear testing range. However, Fry continues to exist, due to either Enos getting Fry's grandmother pregnant before dying, or an unrelated man doing so, whose surname happened to be "Fry". He ends up having sex with his grandmother. Since Fry has already changed history, the rest of the crew decides to launch an attack on Area 51, retrieving Bender, Zoidberg, and a microwave by force and allowing them to return through the closing time portal back to the 31st century.
52	20	"Godfellas"	Susie Dietter	Ken Keeler	March 17, 2002	3ACV20	5.83
Bender is accidentally shot out of the ship's torpedo tube and becomes lost in space. Floating through the ethereal darkness, Bender becomes inhabited with tiny alien life forms, but has trouble playing God to their unyielding prayers.
53	21	"Future Stock"	Brian Sheesley	Aaron Ehasz	March 31, 2002	3ACV21	4.79
With Planet Express in financial trouble, Fry nominates a flashy businessman from the 1980s to replace Professor Farnsworth as CEO of the company. That Guy goes on to sell Planet Express to Mom's Friendly Robot Corporation, putting everyone out of a job.
54	22	"The 30% Iron Chef"	Ron Hughart	Jeff Westbrook	April 14, 2002	3ACV22	4.73
Bender receives culinary lessons from the great chef Helmut Spargle, and puts his skills to the test on national television when he competes against Elzar on "Iron Cook". Meanwhile, Dr. Zoidberg accidentally destroys Professor Farnsworth's ship-in-a-bottle and pins the deed on Fry, only to be struck with remorse afterwards.

== Critical reception ==
=== Reception ===
Andy Patrizio of IGN gave the season a positive review, rating it a 7.0.

=== Nielsen ratings ===
The season ranked 115th in the weekly ratings with an average viewership of 5.9 million viewers.

== Home releases ==
The original Volume Three home release.

Futurama: Volume Three
Set details			Special Features
22 episodes; 4-disc set (DVD); 1.33:1 aspect ratio; Languages: English (Dolby Surround); Subtitles: English SDH; French; Spanish			Optional full-length commentaries on all 22 episodes; Deleted scenes from 17 episodes; Storyboards for "Parasites Lost"; Concept art still gallery; "How to draw Fry and Leela" featurette; International clips; Animatic and 3D models; Hidden intro for "A Tale of Two Santas" Easter egg; Hidden table read for "A Tale of Two Santas" Easter egg; Hidden unused title captions Easter egg
Release dates			Optional full-length commentaries on all 22 episodes; Deleted scenes from 17 episodes; Storyboards for "Parasites Lost"; Concept art still gallery; "How to draw Fry and Leela" featurette; International clips; Animatic and 3D models; Hidden intro for "A Tale of Two Santas" Easter egg; Hidden table read for "A Tale of Two Santas" Easter egg; Hidden unused title captions Easter egg
Region 1	Region 2	Region 4	Optional full-length commentaries on all 22 episodes; Deleted scenes from 17 episodes; Storyboards for "Parasites Lost"; Concept art still gallery; "How to draw Fry and Leela" featurette; International clips; Animatic and 3D models; Hidden intro for "A Tale of Two Santas" Easter egg; Hidden table read for "A Tale of Two Santas" Easter egg; Hidden unused title captions Easter egg
March 9, 2004	June 2, 2003	September 24, 2003	Optional full-length commentaries on all 22 episodes; Deleted scenes from 17 episodes; Storyboards for "Parasites Lost"; Concept art still gallery; "How to draw Fry and Leela" featurette; International clips; Animatic and 3D models; Hidden intro for "A Tale of Two Santas" Easter egg; Hidden table read for "A Tale of Two Santas" Easter egg; Hidden unused title captions Easter egg

Futurama: Volume 3
Set details			Special Features
22 episodes; 4-disc set; 1.33:1 aspect ratio; Languages: English (Dolby Surround); Subtitles: English SDH; French; Spanish			Optional full-length commentaries on all 22 episodes; Deleted scenes from 17 episodes; Storyboards for "Parasites Lost"; Concept art still gallery; "How to draw Fry and Leela" featurette; International clips; Animatic and 3D models; Hidden intro for "A Tale of Two Santas" Easter egg; Hidden table read for "A Tale of Two Santas" Easter egg; Hidden unused title captions Easter egg
Release dates			Optional full-length commentaries on all 22 episodes; Deleted scenes from 17 episodes; Storyboards for "Parasites Lost"; Concept art still gallery; "How to draw Fry and Leela" featurette; International clips; Animatic and 3D models; Hidden intro for "A Tale of Two Santas" Easter egg; Hidden table read for "A Tale of Two Santas" Easter egg; Hidden unused title captions Easter egg
Region 1	Region 2	Region 4	Optional full-length commentaries on all 22 episodes; Deleted scenes from 17 episodes; Storyboards for "Parasites Lost"; Concept art still gallery; "How to draw Fry and Leela" featurette; International clips; Animatic and 3D models; Hidden intro for "A Tale of Two Santas" Easter egg; Hidden table read for "A Tale of Two Santas" Easter egg; Hidden unused title captions Easter egg
July 17, 2012	—N/a	March 13, 2013	Optional full-length commentaries on all 22 episodes; Deleted scenes from 17 episodes; Storyboards for "Parasites Lost"; Concept art still gallery; "How to draw Fry and Leela" featurette; International clips; Animatic and 3D models; Hidden intro for "A Tale of Two Santas" Easter egg; Hidden table read for "A Tale of Two Santas" Easter egg; Hidden unused title captions Easter egg
