= Insane in the Mainframe =

- Futurama episode
- Episode no.: Season 3 Episode 11
- Directed by: Peter Avanzino
- Written by: Bill Odenkirk
- Production code: 3ACV11
- Original air date: April 8, 2001

Episode features
- Opening caption: Bender's Humor by Microsoft Joke
- Opening cartoon: "The Mild West" by Fleischer and Famous Studios (1947)

Episode chronology
← Previous "Where the Buggalo Roam"	Next → "The Route of All Evil"
- Futurama season 3

"Insane in the Mainframe" is the eleventh episode in the third season of the American animated television series Futurama, and the 43rd episode of the series overall. It originally aired on the Fox network in the United States on April 8, 2001. The episode was written by Bill Odenkirk and directed by Peter Avanzino. In the episode, Fry and Bender are admitted to an insane asylum for robots after being charged for their roles in holding up a bank. Fry's attempts to convince the asylum's staff that he is a human fail; he is eventually made to believe that he is a robot, and is deemed "cured" and released from the asylum. After being released, the Planet Express crew try to make him rediscover his humanity; these attempts fail, until Fry bleeds and realizes he is in fact, human.

The episode introduces the recurring Futurama character Roberto.

== Plot ==
After spending $100 (his entire life savings) 'investing' in lottery tickets, Fry decides to open a retirement fund. While at the Big Apple Bank, he and Bender become involved in a holdup. The criminally insane robot Roberto hands them bags of cash for their trouble, and after he runs off, Fry and Bender are charged for their role in the robbery. At the trial, Roberto surreptitiously threatens to kill Fry should Fry testify against him (which the presiding judge recognised as an established legal precedent). After pleading insanity on the advice of their lawyer, Fry was going to be sent to a human asylum, and Bender to a robot asylum; yet since the human asylum is overcrowded (as poverty had been deemed a mental illness by the judge), both Fry and Bender are sent to the HAL Institute for Criminally Insane Robots.

Once there, Fry undergoes a torturous physical examination, to Bender's enjoyment. To make matters worse, the doctors refuse to acknowledge that Fry is human, due to their logic that, if Fry is a patient in a robot asylum, he must be a robot, completely disregarding that he is a biological life form. Fry is roomed with car salesman Malfunctioning Eddie, who is undergoing treatment for his condition of exploding when surprised or shocked. Fry perseveres, surviving on food coughed up by a sick vending machine robot, but his mental state continues to rapidly deteriorate.

When Fry thinks he is going to be released, Malfunctioning Eddie gets released instead, and Fry gets a new roommate: the insane bank robber Roberto, who was captured after robbing the same bank again. The day after suffering a complete mental breakdown, Fry is released, having been "cured" of his delusion of humanity, causing him to think he is a robot. Roberto, fed up with life in the asylum, breaks out and takes Bender with him.

Back at the Planet Express building, Fry attempts to discover his function as a robot. He has no success as a "foodmotron" since no one wishes to eat the sandwiches from his "compartment" (the crotch of his pants), nor as a calculator since he cannot identify a plus sign, nor as a toolbot since he cannot unscrew a bolt with his bare fingers (even after he puts oil in his armpits). Fed up with Fry's attempts at proving he is a robot, Leela passionately kisses Fry in order to remind him of his humanity, but it fails to work.

A newly escaped Roberto decides to rob the Big Apple Bank a third time, and Bender takes him back to the Planet Express building to hide out after nearly getting caught. The New New York police surround the building, and Roberto takes the staff hostage, including Bender who is now convinced that Roberto is a maniac. After waking up from a drunken stupor induced by "refueling" with alcohol, Fry, now convinced that he is a battle droid, takes on Roberto, who jumps out a window after stabbing a can of oil in Fry's chest pocket (thereby "proving" to Roberto he really is a robot and thus a battle droid). Roberto is apprehended by the police. Fry, seeing that he was cut and bleeding after Roberto threw the knife at him before jumping, overcomes his delusions completely. The Planet Express crew praise him for his bravery, with Leela kissing him on the cheek, and Bender tells Fry that he has the heart of a robot inside, just like the severed human heart Bender has in his own body, which he shows to everyone, much to their disgust.

== Cultural references ==
- The title is a reference to the 1993 Cypress Hill song "Insane in the Brain". It also doubles as a reference to the lyric "insane in the membrane", which is often mistaken as the title of the song.
- The name "HAL Institute for Criminally Insane Robots" refers to HAL 9000, a spaceship-installed robot from the Space Odyssey series that murderously turns against its human crew.
- The robot Nurse Ratchet is an allusion to another nurse from Ken Kesey's 1962 novel One Flew Over the Cuckoo's Nest. It may also be a reference to the Autobot superhero in the Transformers robot superhero franchise.
- Fry's being assumed to be insane because he is in an insane asylum is a reference to the Rosenhan experiment.
- The short story "The Sanatorium of Dr. Vliperdius" by Stanisław Lem takes place in a robot insane asylum, and includes several similar characters, including a robot who is convinced he is human.
- The Linctron is based on, and is a reference to, the audio-animatronic Abraham Lincoln in the Disneyland attraction, Great Moments with Mr. Lincoln.
- During the scene in the cafeteria, a robot in a hat represents the Mad Hatter from Alice in Wonderland saying "Change places".

== Reception ==
The A.V. Club gave the episode an A−.
