= Parasites Lost =

- Futurama episode
- Episode no.: Season 3 Episode 2
- Directed by: Peter Avanzino
- Written by: Eric Kaplan
- Production code: 3ACV02
- Original air date: January 21, 2001

Episode features
- Opening caption: If Not Entertaining, Write Your Congressman
- Opening cartoon: "Aladdin and the Wonderful Lamp" by Ub Iwerks (1934)

Episode chronology
← Previous "Amazon Women in the Mood"	Next → "A Tale of Two Santas"
- Futurama season 3

"Parasites Lost" is the second episode in the third season of the American animated television series Futurama, and the 34th episode of the series overall. Although the title is a play on John Milton's epic poem Paradise Lost, the episode is a parody of the 1966 film Fantastic Voyage. It originally aired on the Fox network in the United States on January 21, 2001.

== Plot ==
While making a pit stop at an interstellar truck stop, Fry buys and eats a decaying egg salad sandwich from a vending machine in the restroom. Upon returning to Earth, Fry and Bender are assigned the task of fixing the plasma fusion boiler, which promptly explodes. Bender is not damaged, but Fry is impaled by a large pipe. Despite the severity of the injury, Fry's damaged body repairs itself in seconds, and the subsequent medical examination reveals to the crew that Fry is infested with microscopic worms from the egg salad sandwich.

To eliminate the infestation, Professor Farnsworth makes miniature robotic versions of the crew, except for Fry and Leela. Because the worms know all that Fry knows and would thus defend themselves if Fry knew about the mission, Leela is assigned to distract Fry, who is not told what is happening. Controlling the micro-droids using virtual reality gear, the crew board a miniature Planet Express ship, and enter Fry's ear. Throughout the travel, the crew discover that the worms are drastically improving Fry's intelligence, health, and fitness.

The crew make their way into Fry's bowel, and fight their way to the pelvic splanchnic ganglion, intending to cause a massive bowel movement to expel the worm society. Meanwhile, Leela is enchanted by the now intelligent and muscular Fry. Fry reveals that he loves Leela but only recently was he able to articulate his thoughts. Leela realizes that the worms are responsible for the new, improved Fry, and sets out to stop the Professor. Her micro-droid reaches the nerve, and hacks the rest of the micro-droid crew to pieces with an axe. The Professor tells her that the worms will burrow so deep into Fry's body, he will be stuck with them forever, but Leela reasons that Fry is better off with the worms.

Fry is informed of what has been happening, but is more interested in romancing Leela than clearing the worms out of his body. Although the two share a romantic evening at Leela's apartment—made more powerful when Fry composes Leela a sonnet on the complex musical instrument the Holophonor—Leela tells Fry that she loves the new him. Worried, Fry tells her that he needs to find out something, leaves, and, using his own micro-droid, enters his own body.

Fry confronts the worm leader and engages him in a sword fight after asking the worms to leave so he can learn if Leela loves him or just what they have made of him; he eventually coerces the worms into leaving by threatening to kill himself by destroying the medulla oblongata. With the worms gone, Fry returns to Leela's apartment and explains to her about the worms, and his decision to dispose of them. His awkward attempts at being romantic end when he mentions his previous relationship with Amy, and Leela kicks him out of her apartment. Back at his apartment, Fry begins to re-learn the Holophonor, and creates a crude image of Leela.

== Production ==
Peter Avanzino, director of the first four broadcast seasons of Futurama and two of the straight-to-DVD movies, has stated that episodes with challenging new scenes to draw are his favorites. In particular he notes that he thinks this episode is fun because, "It has microscopic characters inside a human body, a 3-D colonoscopy, a sword fight, a Holophonor sequence (involving otters and characters dancing on Saturn's rings), some sweet sweet lovemaking, and a space-truck stop."

== Broadcast and reception ==
The storyboard artist for this episode, Rodney Clouden, was honored with a Primetime Emmy Award for Outstanding Individual Achievement in Animation in 2001. This episode is also a fan favorite and in 2006 IGN named it as number four in their list of the top 25 Futurama episodes. IGN praised the episode for both its humor and the deepening of Fry and Leela's relationship, particularly the scenes where Fry is willing to "hurt himself and lessen what he has become for Leela". It was dropped off the list in IGN's 2013 reassessment. In 2007 Entertainment Weekly named Futurama number 21 on their list of the top 25 science fiction movies and TV shows of the last 25 years (1982–2007). In the article, this episode was identified as the "best bit" of the series.

In its initial airing, the episode received a Nielsen rating of 4.8/8, placing it 79th among primetime shows for the week of January 15–21, 2001.
