= A Tale of Two Santas =

- Futurama episode
- Episode no.: Season 3 Episode 3
- Directed by: Ron Hughart
- Written by: Bill Odenkirk
- Production code: 3ACV03
- Original air date: December 23, 2001

Guest appearance
- Coolio as Kwanzaabot

Episode features
- Opening caption: This Episode Performed Entirely By Sock Puppets
- Opening cartoon: "Box Car Blues" from Looney Tunes by Harman-Ising Productions (1930)

Episode chronology
← Previous "Parasites Lost"	Next → "The Luck of the Fryrish"
- Futurama season 3

"A Tale of Two Santas" is the third episode in the third season of the American animated television series Futurama, and the 35th episode of the series overall. It originally aired on the Fox network in the United States on December 23, 2001.

== Plot ==
It is Xmas again, and everyone is locking down for the arrival of Robot Santa. The Professor sends the crew to deliver children's letters directly to Santa at his fortress on Neptune. After reading some of the letters, begging Santa not to wreak havoc on the writers, Fry decides to bring Christmas back to the way it was in the past. They land at Jolly Junction, Neptune, and enlist the aid of a pair of Neptunians in sneaking into the fortress.

The crew confront Santa, and Leela presents him with what she believes to be a logical paradox intended to destroy him. Unfortunately, Santa proves immune to paradox, and he takes off after them with a missile launcher. The crew escapes the fortress, and is about to leave in the ship, but Santa grabs the engine and prevents the ship from taking off. The heat from the engine melts the ice under Santa's feet, and he sinks in the ice, which refreezes around him.

With Santa frozen in ice, Bender takes over, and toy-making resumes in Jolly Junction. Bender heads to New New York, where he gets an unwelcome reception from citizens expecting Santa. While taking a beer break, Bender is arrested and put on trial for Santa's crimes against humanity. Bender is found guilty and sentenced to execution by magnetic dismemberment.

Fry and Leela rush back to Neptune to bring in the real Santa to prove Bender's innocence. They carve Santa out in a large block of ice, but the ice melts due to pollution from the toy factory, and Santa is freed. Fry and Leela escape in the ship, but Santa rides on the ship back to Earth. The Planet Express crew tries one last attempt to save Bender, with all of them pretending to be Santa and Zoidberg pretending to be Jesus. Their effort fails, and the execution device is activated.

Moments later, the real Robot Santa bursts through the wall. He rescues Bender and the two go on a proper Xmas rampage. As the Planet Express crew huddle in fear of their lives, Fry concludes he has somewhat succeeded in bringing back the old spirit of Christmas, even if it is fear that is bringing people together instead of love. At the end of the spree of destruction, Santa tells Bender that if he tries a stunt like that again, he will kill him, and pushes Bender off the sleigh amid the burning buildings.

== Production ==
John Goodman, who voiced Robot Santa in the previous episode "Xmas Story", was unavailable to reprise his voice role for this episode; the voice was provided by John DiMaggio. Dan Castellaneta, who voiced the Robot Devil in "Hell Is Other Robots" and "The Devil's Hands Are Idle Playthings", was busy with The Simpsons; his voice was provided by Maurice LaMarche.

== Broadcast and reception ==
Futurama executive producer David X. Cohen referred to this episode as Futurama's lost episode due to the delays in its initial broadcast. Fox Network decided the episode was not appropriate for its 7 p.m. time slot (due to the one use of strong language and scenes of violence, though, according to the DVD commentary, the only extreme violence in this episode is the scenes of destruction when Bender and Robot Santa are terrorizing New New York) and the episode was delayed for a year before being scheduled to air in the 9:30 p.m. time slot on December 23, 2001.

In its initial airing, the episode received a Nielsen rating of 4.1, placing it 77th among prime-time shows for the week of December 10–16, 2001.
