= The Luck of the Fryrish =

- Futurama episode
- Fry discovers the full engraving on the gravestone of his nephew
- Episode no.: Season 3 Episode 4
- Directed by: Chris Loudon
- Written by: Ron Weiner
- Production code: 3ACV04
- Original air date: March 11, 2001

Guest appearance
- Tom Kenny as Yancy Fry Jr.

Episode features
- Opening caption: Broadcast Simultaneously One Year In The Future
- Opening cartoon: "Boom Boom" from Looney Tunes by Warner Bros. Cartoons (1936)

Episode chronology
← Previous "A Tale of Two Santas"	Next → "The Birdbot of Ice-Catraz"
- Futurama season 3

"The Luck of the Fryrish" is the fourth episode in the third season of the American animated television series Futurama, and the 36th episode of the series overall. It originally aired on the Fox network in the United States on March 11, 2001.

== Plot ==
The episode opens in the mid-1970s, where a young Yancy Fry is jealous of his newborn brother Philip, and copies him in anything he can. In 3000, Philip is getting fed up with his bad luck in a horse rally. A flashback shows Fry discovering a seven-leaf clover, which grants him extraordinary luck and allows him to beat his brother in any contest, from basketball to breakdancing. Fry sets off, with Leela and Bender, to find his clover in the ruins of Old New York and makes his way to his old house.

Back in the 1980s, a teenage Fry hides the seven-leaf clover inside his Ronco record vault in his copy of The Breakfast Club soundtrack. In 3000, Fry finds and opens the safe, only to discover the clover is missing. He concludes that Yancy must have stolen it. They happen across a statue of whom they believe to be Yancy, with the seven-leaf clover in his lapel. The inscription, "Philip J. Fry - First Person on Mars", angers Fry because he believes Yancy stole his name and his dream.

Professor Farnsworth pulls up a biographical movie about "Philip J. Fry", where the crew learns that he was a millionaire, rock star, astronaut, and is now buried with the seven-leaf clover in Orbiting Meadows National Cemetery, a graveyard orbiting Earth. A furious Fry sets off to rob Philip J. Fry's grave and recover the clover. The story jumps back to the early 21st century, where an adult Yancy is rummaging through his missing brother's music to find something to play at his wedding. Yancy discovers the seven-leaf clover and takes it.

Fry, Leela and Bender reach the grave site and start digging, but Fry knocks loose some moss that is covering part of an inscription on the tombstone. The story jumps back to Yancy, who is discussing naming his newborn son with his wife. Yancy reveals he misses his brother, and gives Fry's clover to his newborn son and names him Philip J. Fry II. The inscription on the tomb reads "Here Lies Philip J. Fry, named for his uncle, to carry on his spirit." Bender finds the clover, but Fry, moved by his brother's gesture, returns it to his nephew's grave.

== Production ==
According to executive producer David X. Cohen, the storyboards for this particular episode were color-coded to indicate which scenes were based in the 31st century and which in the 20th century. Cohen also notes that the concept of simultaneously telling two stories set in different times was inspired by The Godfather Part II.

== Cultural references ==
The quantum finish at the racetrack is a reference to the Heisenberg uncertainty principle. Additionally, Fry's line, "It's clovering time", is a reference to the catchphrase of the Marvel Comics superhero, the Thing ("It's clobbering time!").

== Broadcast and reception ==
Ron Weiner won an Annie Award for "Outstanding individual achievement for writing in an animated television production" for this episode in 2001. In 2006, IGN ranked this episode as number eleven in their list of the top 25 Futurama episodes due to the surprising ending and emotional nature of the plot. Christopher Bird of Torontoist called the episode "one of the greatest, saddest and most profound" episodes of Futurama, noted that it explores themes of loneliness and isolation, and "that it does this without ever becoming maudlin is a triumph." In 2013, it was ranked number 3 "as voted on by fans" for Comedy Central's Futurama Fanarama marathon.

In its original airing, this episode had a 4.9 rating/9 share and was in 73rd place for the week.
