= Greenland Whale Fisheries =

International musical composition

Greenland Fisheries
Tune for Greenland Fisheries

"Greenland Whale Fisheries" (also called "The Greenland Whale Fishery", "Sperm Whale Fishery", or "The Ballad of the Greenland Whalers") is a traditional sea song, originating in the West Indies but known all over the Atlantic Ocean. In most of the versions collected from oral sources, the song opens up giving a date for the events that it describes (usually between 1823 and 1853). However, the song is actually older than this and a form of it was published as a ballad before 1725. It has been given a Roud number of 347.

The song tells of a whaling expedition that leaves for Greenland. The lookout spots a "whalefish", and harpoon boats are launched. However, the whale strikes the boat with its tail, capsizing it, and several men are killed. The captain grieves over losing his men, but especially for having lost his prey. He then orders the ship to sail for home, calling Greenland a "dreadful place".

Like most traditional songs, "Greenland Whale Fisheries" exists in different versions. Some change details (such as the date of the expedition), and others add or remove verses. Some modern versions, including the ones recorded by Judy Collins and Theodore Bikel, The Chad Mitchell Trio, and later by The Pogues, flip the captain's expression of grief to make him regret losing his catch even more than losing his crew.

In the version popularized by The Weavers and Peter, Paul and Mary, a shanty recorded by Alan Lomax from a Bahamian fisherman is appended, which begins, "When the whale gets strike, and the line run down, and the whale makes a flounder with her tail, and the boat capsized, and we lost our darling man, No more, no more Greenland for you you, Pray Boys, No more, no more Greenland for you."...."

Folk singer Paul Kaplan recorded a song with the same tune under the title "Call Me the Whale". Following a similar chronology, it tells the story from the whale's perspective.

In the Futurama episode "The Birdbot of Ice-Catraz", Bender, in an ironic state of soberness, sings a snippet of the song.

The Greenland Whalefishers, a Celtic punk band from Norway, is named after the song.
