= Amazon Women in the Mood =

- Futurama episode
- Episode no.: Season 3 Episode 1
- Directed by: Brian Sheesley
- Written by: Lewis Morton
- Production code: 3ACV01
- Original air date: February 4, 2001

Guest appearances
- Bea Arthur as Femputer; Karen Maruyama and Suzie Plakson as Amazonians

Episode features
- Opening caption: Secreted by the Comedy Bee
- Opening cartoon: "Art for Art's Sake" (1934)

Episode chronology
← Previous "The Cryonic Woman"	Next → "Parasites Lost"
- Futurama season 3

"Amazon Women in the Mood" is the first episode in the third season of the American animated television series Futurama, and the 33rd episode of the series overall. It originally aired on the Fox network in the United States on February 4, 2001. In the episode, Fry, Bender, Kif, and Zapp Brannigan find themselves held prisoner on a planet inhabited by a race of giant women.

== Plot ==
Unable to ask Amy out himself, Kif allows the bombastic Zapp to take him, Amy, and a begrudging Leela on a double date to a restaurant spaceship. After a series of disastrous hijinks, Zapp takes command of the restaurant and crashes it into the planet Amazonia, where the Amazonians, a tribe of giant, muscular women, capture them.

Fry and Bender try to rescue their friends but are also captured. On the way to the Amazonians' leader, Zapp, Bender, and Fry make fun of the Amazonians' culture. Said leader, a giant computer called Femputer (Bea Arthur), decides to punish the men. Bender is spared because he does not have genitalia, but Zapp, Fry, and Kif are sentenced to "Death! ...by snu-snu!" which is what the Amazonians call sexual intercourse. They report that the last men to visit Amazonia were killed by shattered pelvises. Zapp and Fry are both excited and horrified by the idea, while Kif is only horrified. The frightened Kif tells Amy that he loves her, and she decides to save him.

Zapp and Fry are subjected to snu-snu while Kif avoids his own Amazon by climbing to the ceiling. Leela and Amy convince Bender to reprogram the Femputer, but he discovers that it is operated by a fembot who created the Amazonian society because her home planet was chauvinistic. Bender and the fembot become romantic, and they order the Amazonians to release the men and give them gold. The crew returns to Earth, where Fry and Zapp receive treatment for crushed pelvises, Bender is full of gold bricks, and Kif and Amy are a couple. Everyone agrees the trip to Amazonia was their best mission ever.

== Cultural references ==
The episode's title is a reference to the movie Amazon Women on the Moon. Zapp's rendition of "Lola" is a parody of William Shatner's attempt at "Rocket Man". The bar "Le'Palm d'Orbit" is a reference to the Palme d'Or. Zapp calls himself "the Velour Fog" as a reference to Mel Torme's nickname, "the Velvet Fog".

== Themes ==
The episode features what Science Fiction Weekly calls the "stereotypical women's fantasy"—a world without men, a theme featured often in science fiction. The cliché, unlike the opposite male fantasy of having a harem of women, represents the desire "not to be marginalized in one's own society."

== Broadcast and reception ==
This episode was nominated for an Emmy Award in 2001 for "Outstanding Animated Program (For Programming Less Than One Hour)" but lost to The Simpsons episode "HOMR." In 2006, it was named by IGN as the best episode of Futurama, praising it because it is both "crude and hilarious." The episode was also noted as the "most hilarious" episode in Futurama's third season by Curve and in the book 5000 Episodes and No Commercials: The Ultimate Guide to TV Shows on DVD. In 2013, it was ranked number 10 "as voted on by fans" for Comedy Central's Futurama Fanarama marathon.

In its initial airing, the episode placed 79th in the Nielsen ratings for primetime shows for the week of January 29 – February 4, 2001.

Later reviews and critiques of the episode acknowledge the issues of dubious consent and unhealthy ideas about masculinity. In 2021, Jonah Schuhart of the Looper writes "much of the episode's humor crosses into borderline misogyny, and even makes light of sexual assault." In 2023, The Avocado writes "the only people who undergo snu-snu are consenting enthusiastically, but then if you have to go out of your way to explain why something isn’t rape, you're probably already too far."
