= Where the Buggalo Roam =

- Futurama episode
- Episode no.: Season 3 Episode 10
- Directed by: Patty Shinagawa
- Written by: J. Stewart Burns
- Production code: 3ACV10
- Original air date: March 3, 2002

Episode features
- Opening caption: Krafted with luv (by monsters)
- Opening cartoon: "The Emerald Isle" by Famous Studios (1949)

Episode chronology
← Previous "The Cyber House Rules"	Next → "Insane in the Mainframe"
- Futurama season 3

"Where the Buggalo Roam" is the tenth episode in the third season of the American animated television series Futurama, and the 42nd episode of the series overall. It originally aired on the Fox network in the United States on March 3, 2002. The title is a pun on a lyric from the classic Western folk song "Home on the Range".

== Plot ==
The Planet Express staff head to the Wong Ranch on Mars for a Mars Day barbecue. Amy Wong's parents are happy to see her, but considerably less enthusiastic about her co-workers, especially Dr. Zoidberg, who immediately begins making a nuisance of himself. Kif arrives, and is nervous about meeting his girlfriend Amy's parents for the first time (even though they have clearly met before).

The barbecue proceeds, with Amy's parents being thoroughly unimpressed with Kif. Everything is going well until a strange sound begins, and a dust storm rolls in. Everyone takes cover in the Wong mansion, but the unprotected buggalo outside are rustled during the storm, ruining the Wongs.

Kif sets off with the last remaining buggalo, Amy's personal pet Betsy, in an effort to draw out the rustlers. Professor Farnsworth sends Fry, Leela, and Bender along with him. As the group tell ghost stories, Amy jumps out of the bushes to join them. Kif and the crew find the stolen buggalo hidden in the crater of Olympus Mons when the ground shakes. They find a way to eject the buggalo from the crater, but when they are about to head back to the ranch, the same strange sound from the barbecue begins, and another dust storm whirls in.

While the crew is trapped in the center of the storm, the rustlers fly in on buggalo. The rustlers are the native Martians, who are angry over their ancestors' sale of Mars for one bead. The crew are surprised to learn the buggalo can fly and the Martians indicate only those who truly love the planet can fly a buggalo. The Martians also reveal they had planned to ruin the Wongs by stealing the buggalo; but with the opportunity staring them in the face, they kidnap Amy. Kif and the crew return the buggalo to the Wong Ranch. Initially the Wongs are very impressed with Kif, but another mini-dust storm brings a ransom note.

The Wongs, more unhappy with Kif than ever, call in Zapp Brannigan to resolve the situation. Brannigan, Kif, and the rest of the crew set off for the face on Mars, one of the two entrances to the Martian reservation. Brannigan botches the negotiations, and the Martians call up another dust storm, which engulfs Amy. Kif jumps on the back of Amy's buggalo and flies it into the whirlwind, recovering Amy. The Martians, impressed by Kif's ability to ride a buggalo, call off the storm and offer peace.

Unfortunately, when smoking the Martian peace pipe, Kif chokes on the smoke, angering the Martians. The Martians sentence him to be crushed by the bead they traded the planet for. As the bead lowers from the ceiling, the crew discovers that the "bead" is a gigantic diamond. When they inform the Martian chief of the bead's value, the Martians call off the execution, and leave Mars to find a planet they can purchase. The Wongs cannot believe Kif saved Amy, and credit Zapp with the rescue.

On the Wongs' porch, Kif still feels bad as Amy's family still don't like him, to which she replies that if they liked him, she would not. They kiss while the buggalo stampede and shake the ground, and Kif writes in his diary that he "just made love for the second time".

== Cultural references ==
- R.J. and Joe, attendees at the Wong barbeque, resemble cigarette brand mascots Marlboro Man and Joe Camel.
- Zapp introduces himself to the Wong family as "The Man With No Name", a reference to Clint Eastwood's character in the Dollars Trilogy of films.
- The scene where Zapp throws the Slurm can on the ground and the Martian sheds a tear is a reference to the famous Keep America Beautiful commercial broadcast in the early 1970s.
- The Native Martians selling their land for a supposedly worthless bead is a reference to the myth that the native inhabitants of Manhattan sold the island to the Dutch for twenty-four dollars' worth of beads and trinkets.
- The Wong ranch is based on the ranch in the movie Giant.
- Bender sings a parody of the theme to Bonanza, with lyrics "We've got a right to pick a little fight with rustlers. Somebody wants to pick a fight with us, he'd better bite my ass!"

== Broadcast and reception ==
In its initial airing, the episode received a Nielsen rating of 2.9/4, placing it 88th among primetime shows for the week of February 25 – March 3, 2002.

== See also ==
- Where the Buffalo Roam (disambiguation), other uses of the original lyric the title is based on
