= The 30% Iron Chef =

- Futurama episode
- Episode no.: Season 3 Episode 22
- Directed by: Ron Hughart
- Written by: Jeff Westbrook
- Production code: 3ACV22
- Original air date: April 14, 2002

Episode features
- Opening caption: If Accidentally Watched, Induce Vomiting
- Opening cartoon: "Toys Will Be Toys" by Famous Studios (1949)

Episode chronology
← Previous "Future Stock"	Next → "Kif Gets Knocked Up a Notch"
- Futurama season 3

"The 30% Iron Chef" is the twenty second and final episode in the third season of the American animated television series Futurama, and the 54th episode of the series overall. It originally aired on the Fox network in the United States on April 14, 2002.

== Plot ==
Bender, who aspires to be a chef despite always making disgusting food, makes brunch for the Planet Express crew. Hearing the crew talk about how much they hate his food and comparing it to vomit, Bender becomes overcome with feelings of worthlessness and self-pity and runs away. After asking Elzar to teach him how to cook and being rebuffed, Bender becomes a hobo and rides the rails to the "biggest hobo joint in the Universe." There, he meets Helmut Spargle, a legendary chef who became a hobo after he was replaced on his TV show by a young, upcoming Elzar. Noting that Bender's lack of taste can give him focus on pure flavor, Spargle offers to train him to cook.

When Spargle tries Bender's food for the first time - deeming it "acceptable" - his stomach explodes and with his dying act gives Bender a vial of liquid he claims is "the essence of pure flavour". To avenge Spargle, Bender returns to Earth and challenges Elzar to a cook-off on the TV show "Iron Cook" (a parody of Iron Chef), where they have to use the main ingredient of Soylent Green. Bender prepares terrible looking food, but applies the liquid that Spargle gave him and wins; Elzar, the loser, is forced to wash the dishes. The Professor examines the liquid Bender was given and discovers it is ordinary water, to which Fry suggests that what Spargle really gave Bender was confidence — before the Professor adds that the water was laced with LSD. Bender then proposes a meal for his co-workers, who joyfully accept when Bender adds that the meal will include plenty of "confidence".

Meanwhile, Zoidberg accidentally destroys a scale replica of the universe's largest bottle that Professor Farnsworth has made. He frames Fry who, not having the wherewithal to defend himself, pays the Professor $10 for the material costs, leaving Zoidberg riddled with guilt. After Fry is unable to pay for a commemorative turkey baster at the contest, having given away his last $10, the guilt becomes unbearable for Zoidberg and he admits to breaking the bottle and framing Fry. Unable to repay Fry, Zoidberg tries to commit seppuku using the Chairman's ceremonial Wakizashi, but instead his hard shell damages the $5000 sword and he quickly accuses Fry before running away.

== Broadcast and reception ==
In its initial airing, the episode received a Nielsen rating of 3.0/6, placing it 90th among primetime shows for the week of April 8–15, 2002. The A.V. Club gave the episode a B.
