= Bendless Love =

- Futurama episode
- Episode no.: Season 3 Episode 6
- Directed by: Swinton Scott
- Written by: Eric Horsted
- Production code: 3ACV06
- Original air date: February 11, 2001

Guest appearance
- Jan Hooks as Angleyne

Episode features
- Opening caption: Torn From Tomorrow's Headlines
- Opening cartoon: "Little Ol' Bosko in Bagdad" from Happy Harmonies by MGM (1938)

Episode chronology
| ← Previous "The Birdbot of Ice-Catraz" | Next → "The Day the Earth Stood Stupid" |
- Futurama season 3

"Bendless Love" is the sixth episode in the third season of the American animated television series Futurama, and the 38th episode of the series overall. It originally aired on the Fox network in the United States on February 11, 2001.

== Plot ==
After crashing onto the streets of New New York, the crew discovers that the Planet Express ship's essential L-unit has been straightened. The crew plays a security tape from the night before, which shows Bender "sleep-bending". Professor Farnsworth, whom Bender bent backward, sends Bender away to satisfy his psychological need for bending. The Professor annoys the rest of the crew with his uplifting personality and fascination of looking up at the sky now that he is bent backwards.

Bender gets hired at a bending plant as a scab worker during a strike, and discovers that Flexo, who was sent to prison in Bender's place in a previous episode, is also employed as a scab. Also working at the factory is a buxom blue-collar beauty of a fembot named Angleyne. Bender quickly develops an affection for Angleyne, and they begin dating. Their relationship goes well, until Bender discovers that Angleyne and Flexo are a divorced couple on friendly terms, and that they may still be affectionate.

In an attempt to discover Angleyne's true feelings, Bender disguises himself as Flexo, and meets her at an orbital nightclub. While there, Bender flashes the wad of cash he has made as a strikebreaker, which angers the members of the Robot Mafia who are present. Bender (as Flexo) succeeds in seducing Angleyne, but when she discovers his identity, Bender rushes off to kill Flexo.

Bender arrives at the bending plant where Flexo is working the night shift, and starts a fight. Meanwhile, in the crane control booth, the Robot Mafia moves an unbendable girder into position above Bender and Flexo. Because they do not know that Bender was disguised as Flexo, the Robot Mafia wants Flexo dead for Bender's monetary indiscretions. The girder is dropped on top of Flexo, crushing him. Angleyne confesses that she still loves Flexo, and Bender decides that her happiness is more important than his, and resolves to save Flexo by bending the unbendable girder. After a mighty struggle, he frees Flexo, earning Angleyne's appreciation, but not her love.

Having satisfied his need for bending, Bender returns to his job at Planet Express, where he bends Farnsworth into a downer angle, rendering him depressed, much to the elation of the gang.

== Broadcast and reception ==
In its initial airing, the episode received a Nielsen rating of 4.6/8, placing it 79th among primetime shows for the week of February 5–11, 2001.

== Awards ==
Actor John DiMaggio (Bender, Flexo, Sal, Joey Mousepad, Elzar, others) won an Annie Award for "Outstanding individual achievement for voice acting by a male performer in an animated television production" for his performance as Bender in this episode.

== Legacy ==
A pickaxe based on the Unbendable Girder seen in the episode was added to Fortnite Battle Royale on July 26, 2023.
