= 56th Writers Guild of America Awards =

56th WGA Awards
- Date: February 21, 2004
- Organized by: Writers Guild of America, East and the Writers Guild of America, West

Highlights
- Best Adapted Screenplay: American Splendor

The 56th Writers Guild of America Awards, given in 2004, honored the film and television best writers of 2003.

== Winners ==
=== Film ===
==== Best Adapted Screenplay ====
American Splendor - Shari Springer Berman and Robert Pulcini

- Cold Mountain - Anthony Minghella
- The Lord of the Rings: The Return of the King - Philippa Boyens, Peter Jackson and Fran Walsh †
- Mystic River - Brian Helgeland
- Seabiscuit - Gary Ross

==== Best Original Screenplay ====
Lost in Translation - Sofia Coppola †

- Bend It Like Beckham - Guljit Bindra, Gurinder Chadha and Paul Mayeda Berges
- Dirty Pretty Things - Steven Knight
- In America - Jim, Kirsten and Naomi Sheridan;
- The Station Agent - Tom McCarthy

=== Television ===
==== Best Episodic Drama ====
Day 2: 7:00 P.M. - 8:00 P.M - 24 - Evan Katz

- Bounty - Law & Order - Michael S. Chernuchin
- Loss - Law & Order: Special Victims Unit - Michelle Fazekas and Tara Butters
- Abomination - Law & Order: Special Victims Unit - Michelle Fazekas and Tara Butters
- Pilot - The O.C. - Josh Schwartz
- Disaster Relief - The West Wing - Alexa Junge and Lauren Schmidt

==== Best Episodic Comedy ====
No Sex, Please, We're Skittish - Frasier - Bob Daily

- Malcolm Films Reese - Malcolm in the Middle - Dan Kopelman
- Day Care - Malcolm in the Middle - Gary Murphy and Neil Thompson
- A Woman's Right to Shoes - Sex and the City - Jenny Bicks

==== Best Animation Screenplay ====
Godfellas - Futurama

==== Best Adapted Long Form Screenplay ====
Out of the Ashes - Anne Meredith Bastogne (Episode 6 of 2001 miniseries 'Band of Brothers')
