= Greenland Whalefishers =

Norwegian musical group

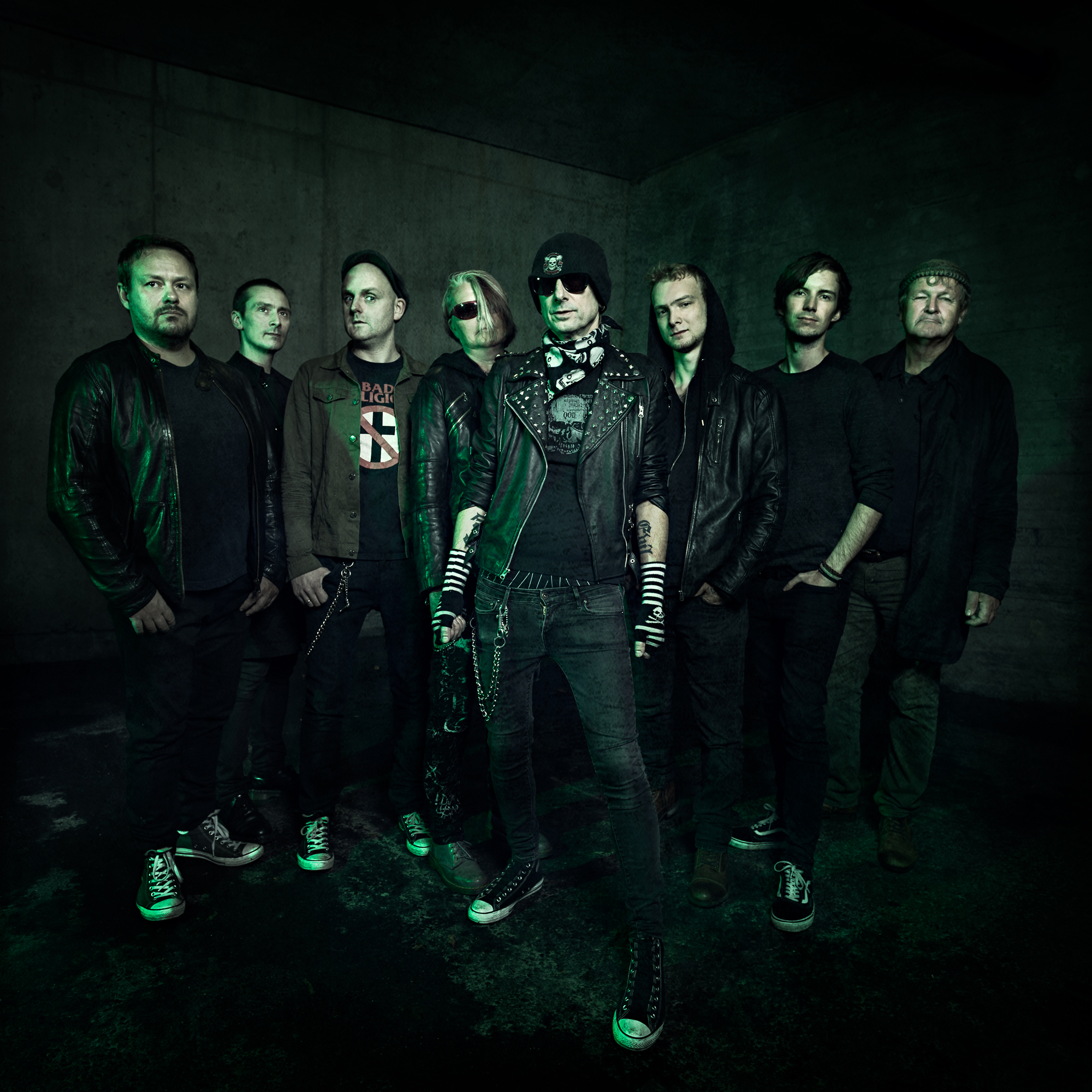
- Official Band Photo 2022

Background information
- Origin: Bergen, Norway
- Genres: Celtic punk, folk punk
- Years active: 1994–present
- Label: Patchwork Record Production
- Members: Arvid Grov; Agnes Skollevoll; Tommy Bårdsen; Stig Blindheim; Odin Døssland; Trond Olsen; Ørjan Eikeland Risan; Stig Bruhjell
- Past members: Trond Eikemo; Bjørn Helgesen; Atle-Hjørn Øien; Kjellaug Borthen; Terje Schumann-Olsen; Alexander Bjotveit; Gunnar "Twosheds" Grov; Kristian Malmo; Trond Olsen; Jon-Erik Kvåle Øien; Ronny Terum
- Website: Greenlandwhalefishers.com

Greenland Whalefishers, named after the traditional folk tune The Greenland Whale Fisheries, is a Norwegian folk punk band established in 1994, playing music influenced by Celtic traditional music combined with British punk. The musical style of this type of music is also referred to as celtic punk and paddy rock. Greenland Whalefishers are one of the founders of the Celtic punk movement, albeit 10 years after The Pogues.

== Band members ==
Current members

- Arvid Grov - Vocals
- Ørjan Risan - Drums
- Stig Bruhjell - Mandoline, Banjo, Bouzouki
- Agnes Skollevoll - Tin Whistle
- Tommy Bårdsen - Bass
- Odin Døssland - Fiddle
- Trond Olsen - Guitar
- Stig Blindheim - Electric Guitar

Former members

- Kjellaug Borthen
- Trond Eikemo
- Bjørn Helgesen
- Kristian Malmo
- Ronny Terum
- Gunnar Grov
- Atle-Hjørn Øien
- Terje Schumann-Olsen
- Trond Olsen
- Alexander Bjotveit
- Jon-Erik Kvåle Øien

== Discography ==
=== Albums ===
- The Mainstreet Sword (1996)
- Loboville (2001)
- Streets of Salvation (2004)
- Loboville (Enhanced including video footage) (2005)
- The Mainstreet Sword (Enhanced including video footage) (2005)
- Down and Out (2006)
- Amazing Space (b-sides and other crap) (2008)
- Joining Forces (with SMZB) (2008)
- Songs from the Bunker (2010)
- Live At Farmer Phil's Festival (2012)
- The Thirsty Cave (2015)
- Based On a True Story (2019)

=== EPs ===
- Maybe The Salvation Starts Here (2004)
- Hit the Ground (2006)
- Looney Tunes (2014)

=== Singles ===
- Mary B. (Good) (1994)
- The Clown (1996)
- T-Bell's Blues (1998)
- Johnny Lee Roth (2001)
- Punk Shanty (2006)
- K Says (2019) (digital)
- Darkness (2019) (digital)
- St. Patrick's Day Drinking (2022) (digital)
- Celtic Punk (2022) (digital)

=== Film ===
- 20 Years Of Waiting (Documentary) (2014)
- Touring Ireland (Documentary) (2016)
- Barely Alive on the Inside (Live Concert Documentary) (2020)
- Waiting For the World (Concert Documentary) (2021)

== Music in popular culture ==
Greenland Whalefishers contributed with their song "Rocky Road To London" to the movie The Boondock Saints II: All Saints Day.

== Reviews ==
- The Thirsty Cave review by Paddy Rock Radio (USA)
- The Thirsty Cave review by Celtic Folk Punk (Sp)
- Looney Tunes EP review by London Celtic Punks (UK)
- Lonney Tunes EP review by ReadJunk (NY, USA)
- 20 Years Of Waiting Documentary Movie review by Shite 'n' Onions (USA)
- 20 Years Of Waiting Documentary Movie review by PaddyRock.com (USA)
- 20 Years Of Waiting Documentary Movie review by ReadJunk (USA)
- Live At Farmer Phil's Festival review by Paddy Rock Radio
- Live At Farmer Phil's Festival review by Punk.ie
- Live At Farmer Phil's Festival review by ReadJunk
- Live At Farmer Phil's Festival review by Shite N' Onions
- Live At Farmer Phil's Festival review by Celtic Rock Music Germany
- Streets of Salvation review by Shite N' Onions
- Streets of Salvation review by Folkworld
- Down N' Out review by Shite N' Onions
- Songs From The Bunker review by Read Junk
