= That's Lobstertainment! =

- Futurama episode
- Episode no.: Season 3 Episode 8
- Directed by: Bret Haaland
- Written by: Patric M. Verrone
- Production code: 3ACV08
- Original air date: February 25, 2001

Guest appearance
- Hank Azaria as Harold Zoid

Episode features
- Opening caption: Deciphered From Crop Circles
- Opening cartoon: "Box Car Blues" from Looney Tunes by Harman-Ising Productions (1930)

Episode chronology
← Previous "The Day the Earth Stood Stupid"	Next → "The Cyber House Rules"
- Futurama season 3

"That's Lobstertainment!" is the eighth episode in the third season of the American animated television series Futurama, and the 40th episode of the series overall. It originally aired on the Fox Network in the United States on February 25, 2001. In this episode, Dr. Zoidberg reveals that he is a close relative of the "silent hologram" era actor, Harold Zoid. After finding Harold in a restaurant, Zoidberg decides to help him finance a film to revitalize his career.

The show's producers have said that "That's Lobstertainment!" is considered one of the series' least popular episodes. “That’s Lobstertainment!” was written by Patric M. Verrone and directed by Bret Haaland, and has received mixed critical reception.

== Plot ==
After a disastrous attempt at stand-up comedy, Dr. Zoidberg informs the crew that his uncle, Harold Zoid, was a star in the silent hologram era. Zoidberg writes to his uncle, asking for help with his comedy act. The washed-up Harold Zoid sees this as an opportunity to restart his career. The crew sets off for Hollywood. While taking a bus tour of movie stars' homes, Bender leaves the tour, and scams his way into employment as Calculon's water heater. Shortly afterward, Zoidberg meets his uncle in a restaurant. Harold Zoid tells him to give up comedy, because he would be perfect for drama, and he needs Zoidberg to finance a drama to the tune of a million dollars. As Zoidberg is practically broke, Bender tells Calculon that he can star in the movie if he provides the production money. Calculon initially refuses on account of disliking the font, but after learning Harold Zoid wrote the script, and getting a guarantee from Bender that he will win an Oscar, he accepts.

The film, The Magnificent Three, is a story about a son (the Vice-President of Earth) not wanting to follow in his father's (the President of Earth) footsteps. Due to Harold Zoid's inexperience with drama and outdated directorial style, the movie is terrible, and at the premiere, the entire audience walks out. Furious, Calculon threatens to kill Bender, Zoidberg, and Harold Zoid if they do not get him an Oscar. They all agree to rig the awards. Meanwhile, Leela and Fry crash their ship in the La Brea Tar Pits on the way to the premiere. When the awards reach the Best Actor award, Dr. Zoidberg tosses presenter Billy Crystal off the stage and takes his place. In place of the fifth nominee, he substitutes Calculon. But when he sees his uncle's depression at being a has-been, Zoidberg announces him as the winner.

In his acceptance speech, Harold Zoid says his nephew's gesture has made him realize that the award itself is secondary to the knowledge that someone, even if only one person, still respects him as a filmmaker. Calculon, somewhat chastened by this speech, decides not to kill him or the others. Fry and Leela finally escape from the tar pits and are allowed to enter the after party when the skeleton they are dragging is recognized as that of Sylvester Stallone.

== Production ==
In the DVD commentary, the producers note that the episode is generally considered by fans to be one of the worst episodes of the series.

== Reception ==
"That's Lobstertainment!" originally aired February 25, 2001, on Fox. In its original American broadcast, "That's Lobstertainment!" was watched by an estimated 8.06 million viewers and ranked 70th for the week of February 19 – 25, 2001.

Zach Handlen of The A.V. Club gave "That's Lobstertainment!" a positive review, saying "while [it] isn’t the sharpest written episode of the series, it has a place in my heart".

In 2023, Collider listed the "10 Funniest 'Futurama' Episodes", placing this episode in the #10 spot. The author gave praise towards the episode for its "[poking] fun at the entertainment industry".
