= The Route of All Evil =

- Futurama episode
- Episode no.: Season 3 Episode 12
- Directed by: Brian Sheesley
- Written by: Dan Vebber
- Production code: 3ACV12
- Original air date: December 8, 2002

Episode features
- Opening caption: Disclaimer: Any Resemblance to Actual Robots Would Be Really Cool
- Opening cartoon: "Heap Hep Injuns" by Fleischer and Famous Studios (1950)

Episode chronology
← Previous "Insane in the Mainframe"	Next → "Bendin' in the Wind"
- Futurama season 3

"The Route of All Evil" is the twelfth episode in the third season of the American animated television series Futurama, and the 44th episode of the series overall. It originally aired on the Fox network in the United States on December 8, 2002. In the episode, Dwight and Cubert form their own delivery company in an attempt to impress their fathers.

== Plot ==
Having been suspended from school for salting the bully Bret Blob (who appears to have the same weakness as slugs), Dwight and Cubert find themselves stuck with their fathers Professor Hubert Farnsworth and Hermes Conrad. They do some annoyances to the staff. Meanwhile, Fry, Leela and Bender brew beer inside Bender, then they treat Bender like an expectant mom. Using Professor Farnsworth's invention that makes anyone sound like him, Dwight and Cubert fool Fry, Leela, and Bender into doing a pizza delivery to Dogdoo 8 at the end of the universe.

One week later, Leela, Fry, and Bender return. Upon breaking Dwight's hand-held game with her hand, Leela states to Cubert and Dwight that if she was their mother, she would "give them a stern talking to by their father when he got home from the Senate". When Professor Farnsworth asks what the boys did, Bender states that they sent them on a fake pizza delivery as Fry states that the address was Dogdoo 8 where the universe actually ends at Dogdoo 7. As Cubert and Dwight claim that Fry and Leela were brewing beer in Bender, Professor Farnsworth and Hermes discipline the boys by ordering them to get jobs. Cubert and Dwight decide to start up a company to rival Planet Express: a paper route.

They become so successful that they take over Planet Express when it is discovered that the Professor was declared legally dead three years ago (he was really taking a nap in a ditch in the park). The name of the company is then changed to the name of the boys' delivery route, 'Awesome Express'. Humiliated, Hermes and the Professor leave Planet Express.

Dwight and Cubert end up taking on too many customers and cannot deliver the papers. In a panic, they run to Hermes and the Professor to solve the problem. All the papers are successfully delivered; however, as they pass Bret Blob's house the boys admit that they broke his window last week. Hermes and the Professor take the boys to apologize. When Mr. Blob does not accept the apology and insults them, the boys' fathers take offense and start a fight. Blob beats them up.

At the hospital, Mr. Blob apologizes to Hermes and the Professor. Bender comes in with his beers to enjoy, and everything ends happily except for Cubert and Dwight who are swallowed by Bret Blob.

== Cultural references ==
- While Bender, Leela and Fry are buying beer near the beginning of the episode, one brand is called Klein's and is in a Klein bottle. One other brand on the shelf is St. Pauli's Exclusion Principle. The brand "Pabst Blue Robot" is a parody on the brand Pabst Blue Ribbon.
- When Dwight and Cubert deliver the paper the first time round, they also deliver one to The Little Prince. He even yells "Au Revoir", after he is shot off his planet by Hermes in the end, referencing to the French origin of the novella.
- When Dwight and Cubert are being chased by the dog over the asteroid, an Exogorth comes up from the hole in the asteroid and eats the dog. This is a parody of the Exogorth trying to eat the Millennium Falcon in The Empire Strikes Back.
- Bender's naming ideas for his beer, "Benderbrau" and "Botweiser" are both parodies on the popular alcoholic brands Baderbräu and Budweiser respectively.

== Broadcast and reception ==
In its initial airing, the episode received a Nielsen rating of 2.6/4, placing it 97th among primetime shows for the week of December 2–8, 2002.
