= I Dated a Robot =

- Futurama episode
- Episode no.: Season 3 Episode 15
- Directed by: James Purdum
- Written by: Eric Kaplan
- Production code: 3ACV15
- Original air date: May 13, 2001

Guest appearance
- Lucy Liu as herself

Episode features
- Opening caption: No Humans Were Probed In The Making Of This Episode
- Opening cartoon: Private Snafu in "Censored" by Warner Bros. Cartoons (1944)

Episode chronology
| ← Previous "Time Keeps On Slippin'" | Next → "A Leela of Her Own" |
- Futurama season 3

"I Dated a Robot" is the fifteenth episode in the third season of the American animated television series Futurama, and the 47th episode of the series overall. It originally aired on the Fox network in the United States on May 13, 2001.

== Plot ==
After the crew sees an episode of The Scary Door, Fry decides to do all the things he always wanted to do, and the Planet Express crew obliges. After demolishing a planet, visiting the edge of the universe, and riding a dinosaur, one of his few remaining fantasies is to date a celebrity. Fry and Leela venture into the Internet to visit nappster.com and download a celebrity's personality. Fry downloads the personality of Lucy Liu into a blank robot, which begins projecting an image of her.

Fry and the Liu-bot begin dating, aided by her being programmed to like Fry. The other Planet Express employees, concerned about his relationship, show him the standard middle-school film that predicts the destruction of civilization if humans date robots. Unfortunately, Fry ignores the movie, and keeps making out with his Liu-bot.

Bender, offended by the concept of competing with humans for the attention of female robots, sets off with Leela and Zoidberg to shut down Nappster. In the Nappster building, a broken sign eventually reveals that the company is actually "Kidnappster". Breaking into the back room, Bender discovers that Nappster has been kidnapping the heads of celebrities and making illegal copies of them. Leela grabs the real Lucy Liu's head, and the four take off. The Nappster CFO loads a backup disk of Liu, and creates a horde of Liu-bots ordered to kill.

Leela and the others, running from the robot horde, duck into a movie theater, where Fry is seeing a movie with his Liu-bot. Everyone ducks into the projection room. Zoidberg discovers a five-ton bag of popping corn, and sends it pouring onto the robots on the theater floor. The robots eat their way out from under the corn and start shooting popcorn kernels from their mouths at the room. Fry's Liu-bot points the projector at the other robots, and the heat causes the popcorn to pop, bursting the robots. At the request of the real Lucy Liu, Fry blanks his now-damaged robot in order to protect her image. A hypocritical Bender begins dating Liu's head much to Fry's anger.

== Cultural references ==
- The "I Dated a Robot!" movie is a parody of school propaganda films such as Reefer Madness, Duck and Cover and other after-school specials.
- Bender also references the 70s show All in the Family immediately following the propaganda film, he both adopts the character Archie Bunker's manner of speaking and makes a play on his "Meat head" line, quite similar to Bender's own "Meatbag".
- The internet website Kidnappster is a direct parody of Napster.

== Broadcast and reception ==
In its initial airing, the episode received a Nielsen rating of 3.8/8, placing it 76th among primetime shows for the week of May 7–13, 2001. Zack Handlen of The A.V. Club gave the episode a B+.
