= A Pharaoh to Remember =

- Futurama episode
- Episode no.: Season 3 Episode 17
- Directed by: Mark Ervin
- Written by: Ron Weiner
- Production code: 3ACV17
- Original air date: March 10, 2002

Episode features
- Opening caption: Psst... Big Party At Your House After The Show
- Opening cartoon: "Toys Will Be Toys" by Fleischer and Famous Studios (1949)

Episode chronology
← Previous "A Leela of Her Own"	Next → "Anthology of Interest II"
- Futurama season 3

"A Pharaoh to Remember" is the seventeenth episode in the third season of the American animated television series Futurama, and the 49th episode of the series overall. It originally aired on the Fox network in the United States on March 10, 2002. The episode's title references the title of the 1957 film An Affair to Remember.

== Plot ==
Bender becomes worried that his name will not live in infamy after a heist he pulled is attributed to a human crook. Bender sets out to make a name for himself, but his efforts are futile. To make him feel better, the Planet Express crew stage a mock funeral for Bender, but he is unreasonably critical of their efforts and storms out.

Professor Farnsworth tasks the crew with the delivery of a sandstone block to the planet Osiris IV, whose civilization is based on what they learned when they had visited Ancient Egypt (a parody of ancient astronauts). The order turns out to be a ruse to capture the crew and put them to work as slaves, constructing a funeral pyramid for the current pharaoh, Hamenthotep. Bender, amazed with the means of memorializing the pharaoh, becomes a workaholic and far exceeds the pace of the other slaves.

Hamenthotep arrives to inspect the completed work. Greatly satisfied, he decides to free the slaves but is killed when the monument's nose falls and crushes him; Bender stonewalls Hamenthotep to prevent him freeing the slaves through his last words. The priests plan to determine their next pharaoh using the "Wall of Prophecy" the next day. Bender spends the night modifying the wall so that he is selected as the new pharaoh. At his coronation, he immediately declares a new reign of terror over Osiris IV and orders the construction of a one billion cubits tall statue of himself, and tasks the slaves to complete the work quickly. Bender oversees the construction personally, pushing the slaves on with unreasonable harshness. The statue extends into space to the point where slaves need rocket-packs and spacesuits to complete it. When it is finished, Bender is dissatisfied and orders it be rebuilt. The high priests, fed up with Bender's demands, entomb him, Fry, and Leela.

Fry and Leela propose to use explosive Schnapps stored in the tomb to blast a hole and escape, but Bender, still obsessed with being remembered, refuses to let them destroy the statue. Fry and Leela respond by pretending to forget Bender; unable to endure this treatment, he gives in to their demand. They create a crack in the foot of the statue to escape to the Planet Express ship. As they flee, their explosion ignites the rest of the materials in the tomb, causing it to explode in a giant fireball. Bender becomes depressed that without his statue, he will be forgotten, but Leela assures him that he will be remembered for his brief reign of terror.

== Broadcast and reception ==
In its initial airing, the episode received a Nielsen rating of 3.0/4, placing it 97th among primetime shows for the week of March 4–10, 2002. Zack Handlen of The A.V. Club gave the episode an A−.
