= The Birdbot of Ice-Catraz =

- Futurama episode
- Episode no.: Season 3 Episode 5
- Directed by: James Purdum
- Written by: Dan Vebber
- Production code: 3ACV05
- Original air date: March 4, 2001

Guest appearance
- Phil Hendrie as Free Waterfall Sr.

Episode features
- Opening caption: Now With Chucklelin
- Opening cartoon: "Bubbles" (1922)

Episode chronology
← Previous "The Luck of the Fryrish"	Next → "Bendless Love"
- Futurama season 3

"The Birdbot of Ice-Catraz" is the fifth episode in the third season of the American animated television series Futurama, and the 37th episode of the series overall. It originally aired on the Fox network in the United States on March 4, 2001. The episode was written by Dan Vebber and directed by James Purdum. Phil Hendrie guest stars in the episode as Free Waterfall Sr.

== Plot ==
Professor Farnsworth gives the crew the controversial mission of towing a "dark matter oil" tanker on a dangerous path through the Solar System, which includes a very low fly-by near a penguin colony on Pluto. Leela refuses the mission on conscientious grounds and leaves to join an environmentalist group named Penguins Unlimited, so the Professor makes Bender the new captain of the Planet Express ship. After failing to stop Bender at the tanker's initial hitching point, Leela and Penguins Unlimited race back to Pluto to intercept the tanker at the penguin colony instead. Meanwhile, Fry gets fed up with Bender's arrogant style of captaining, and rejects both his leadership and friendship. A distraught Bender, unwilling to drink on his own, goes on a sobriety binge (Note: As previously established in "I, Roommate", robots in the Futurama universe rely heavily on alcohol to fuel their systems, and severe alcohol deficiency will cause robots to be incapacitated in a very similar manner to drunkenness.) and ends up flying the tanker on an erratic course over Pluto, where it collides with an iceberg and spills oil across the penguin colony.

For his role in the disaster, Bender is sentenced to community service cleaning up the oil spill alongside Penguins Unlimited. However, when the police officers supervising him are distracted, Bender dons a tuxedo and blends into the colony of penguins, and Leela and the rest of the crew spend the night trying to find him; later that night, an orca attack forces Bender into a hard reboot, which leaves him genuinely believing he is a penguin. Meanwhile, Penguins Unlimited soon discovers the oil's true biohazardous effects on the penguins: an exponential acceleration of their fertility rates and incubation periods, which has left the colony suffering from sudden overpopulation just one day after the spill. The group declares open hunting season on the penguins as a drastic measure to spare them from mass starvation, and Leela reluctantly agrees to take part, but her first and only victim turns out to be Bender, who reboots back to his normal self after she shoots him.

When the hunters arrive, Bender leads a large force of penguins in an assault. After the penguins succeed in driving off the hunters, Bender takes off his tuxedo. Unfortunately, since he had taught the penguins to attack anything that "ain't black and white", they begin to chase him and Leela onto a floating block of ice, but Fry soon arrives in the Planet Express ship to rescue them. When the ship lands on the ice, it tips the surface of the block, sending the penguins sliding into the gaping mouth of the orca that previously attacked Bender. Leela and Bender board the ship and everyone returns to Earth, with Leela reasoning that nature will set things right.

== Continuity ==
When Bender first reboots, he is initialized as "Penguin" because his display sees penguins. When Bender reboots later after being shot by Leela, he is initialized as "Human" because he sees Leela. This is another clue that Leela is a human mutant and not an alien (as is revealed in the season 4 episode, "Leela's Homeworld"). In season 7's "Forty Percent Leadbelly", as Dr. Beeler is browsing through Bender's file system, his Penguin Personality folder is shown next to his Main Personality folder. In the beginning of the episode while the professor is going over the mission, he points out the path using the "fing-longer". season 2 "Anthology of Interest I"

== Cultural references ==
- The episode is a parody of the Exxon Valdez oil spill, with the dark matter tanker named the Juan Valdez; also referencing the Colombian coffee mascot.
- The fictional conservation agency depicted as Penguins Unlimited is a parody of the actual agency Ducks Unlimited, sharing the same criticism that the organization exists to merely fulfill the members' interest in hunting.
- The title of this episode is a reference to Robert Stroud, who was known as the Birdman of Alcatraz.
- Bender's speech to the penguins as they attack is a reference to Winston Churchill's famous "We shall fight on the beaches" speech.
- The scene where the killer whale tips the slab of ice to eat the penguins is a reference to the final scene of the 1977 film Orca.
- When Bender suffers an electric shock upon landing head-first on a slab of ice after being attacked by an orca, he whistles one of R2-D2's signature beeps.
- During his state of sobriety, Bender can be heard singing "Greenland Whale Fisheries".

== Broadcast and reception ==
In its original airing, the episode was number 75 for the week and received a 4.9 rating share. In 2006, the episode was ranked by IGN.com as number 22 in their list of the Top 25 Futurama episodes, noting Free Waterfall Sr. and the penguin overpopulation in particular as the funniest parts of the episode.
