= Obsoletely Fabulous =

- Futurama episode
- Episode no.: Season 4 Episode 14
- Directed by: Dwayne Carey-Hill
- Written by: Dan Vebber
- Production code: 4ACV14
- Original air date: July 27, 2003

Episode features
- Opening caption: You can't prove it won't happen
- Opening cartoon: "Much Ado About Mutton" by Famous Studios (1947)

Episode chronology
← Previous "Bend Her"	Next → "The Farnsworth Parabox"
- Futurama season 4

"Obsoletely Fabulous" is the fourteenth episode in the fourth season of the American animated television series Futurama, and the 68th episode of the series overall. It originally aired on the Fox network in the United States on July 27, 2003. Set in a retro-futuristic 31st century, the series follows the adventures of the employees of Planet Express, an interplanetary delivery company. In this episode, Mom's Friendly Robot Company introduces a new model of robot, so older models, including Bender, are required to get a system upgrade.

== Plot ==
At a robot expo, Mom's Friendly Robot Company introduces a new robot: Robot 1-X. Professor Farnsworth buys one to help out around the office. Feeling obsolete after witnessing 1-X outperform him at every assigned task, Bender decides to get an upgrade so he can be compatible with Robot 1-X. After witnessing another robot display a complete personality change after receiving the upgrade, Bender begins to have second thoughts, and mid-upgrade he changes his mind and leaps out the window.

Too scared to get the upgrade but unable to face the others without it, he heads out to sea, only to wash up on an uncharted island. Bender finds four outdated robots living on the island and befriends them. The outdated robots gradually convert Bender to their rejection of technology, and he orders them to "downgrade" his metal robotics to a wooden body. Bender leads his friends to New New York, where they wage war on technology. The band of five destroy most technology in the city, including Mom's factory, and head to Planet Express to destroy Robot 1-X.

After destroying the power lines, Bender breaks into the hangar, where he confronts his former crew. Bender has his robotic friends throw boulders at Robot 1-X, but they miss and hit the Planet Express ship, which falls and pins the crew down to the floor. A candle falls onto the leaking fuel from the ship, forming a ring of fire around the crew. Bender tries to use the extinguisher, but his wooden body collapses from termite damage and catches fire. Bender resorts to asking Robot 1-X to save the crew. Once 1-X saves them, Bender is overcome with feelings of gratitude and friendship for 1-X.

It is then revealed that Bender never left the upgrade factory in the first place, and his experience on the island and everything after was an illusion triggered by the upgrade process. Amazed at how real the vision was, Bender begins wondering if life itself is just the product of his or someone else's imagination, but comes to the conclusion that "Reality is what you make of it," and walks off into a fantasy world with moonshine-bearing unicorns and cigar-lighting fairies.

== Production ==
A scene during the robot upgrade was cut featuring Mom brainwashing the robots. There was also an extra scene at the convention cut.

Regular voice actor John DiMaggio did Bender's dialogue in the scene where he dances to "I'm Alright" by Kenny Loggins before the crew had the song available. The music for the scene when the obsolete robots rampage the city was written by Christopher Tyng and not licensed. The sound effect for Bender's arms falling off was meant to be temporary but it was kept because it was funnier than any of the later attempts at the sounds.

== Cultural references ==
- The episode's title is a play on words, referring to the British sitcom Absolutely Fabulous (and the related song of the same name).
- The robot Sinclair 2K was based on the Timex Sinclair 1000, the American version of the ZX81 microcomputer. His design was based on Robbie the Robot from Forbidden Planet.
- The robot Lisa was named after the Apple Lisa.
- The design for Robot I-X was initially inspired by the iMac.

== Broadcast and reception ==
In its initial airing, the episode received a Nielsen rating of 2.8/6, placing it 86th among primetime shows for the week of July 21–27, 2003.
