= The Cyber House Rules =

- Futurama episode
- Episode no.: Season 3 Episode 9
- Directed by: Susie Dietter
- Written by: Lewis Morton
- Production code: 3ACV09
- Original air date: April 1, 2001

Episode features
- Opening caption: Please Rise For The Futurama Theme Song
- Opening cartoon: "Congo Jazz" from Looney Tunes by Harman-Ising Productions (1930)

Episode chronology
← Previous "That's Lobstertainment!"	Next → "Where the Buggalo Roam"
- Futurama season 3

"The Cyber House Rules" is the ninth episode in the third season of the American animated television series Futurama, and the 41st episode of the series overall. It originally aired on the Fox network in the United States on April 1, 2001. The title comes from the John Irving novel The Cider House Rules.

== Plot ==
Leela is invited to a reunion at her old orphanarium. She initially dreads seeing the people who made fun of her eye as a kid, but she decides rubbing her success in their faces would be very satisfying. Leela attempts to wave her impressive lifestyle in the other orphans' faces, but they quickly resume making fun of her eye. But Adlai Atkins (voiced by guest star Tom Kenny), the only other success story from the orphanarium, shoos them away. Adlai, now a phaser eye surgeon, offers to rework Leela's face to make her look normal, and she jumps at the chance, in spite of Fry's objections. Meanwhile, Bender adopts twelve orphans for the $100-a-week-per-child government stipend.

The operation is a success, and Leela adapts to her new, normal-looking life. Adlai asks the two-eyed Leela out, which causes Fry to exhibit signs of jealousy. In short order, Adlai tells Leela that he is ready to settle down and have kids. A receptive Leela suggests that they should adopt, and Adlai agrees. They go to Bender, who is now selling the twelve children because the government stipends are not a good get-rich-quick scheme. Leela wants to adopt Sally (voiced by guest star Nicole St. John), a girl with an ear on her forehead and a tail. Adlai objects, and then suggests that the child have an operation to remove the ear and make her "acceptable". Leela, horribly offended, finally realizes that she was better off abnormal and physically threatens Adlai into removing her prosthetic eye.

Bender, having been arrested by child services for "child cruelty, child endangerment, depriving children of food, selling children as food and misrepresenting the weight of livestock", returns the orphans to the orphanarium (which is subsequently named after him, though later episodes do not reflect this). After the children give Bender a drawing of him and the orphans, Bender expresses distaste for it and crumples it up and throws it in his chest as the orphans sadly walk off. Bender then sneakily pulls the drawing back out, smooths it out, and places it on the inside of his chest door with a magnet. The children notice this and mob him with hugs.

== Cultural references ==
- The bandages wrapped fully around Leela's head, and the gradual removal of them as seen through her perspective is a reference to The Twilight Zone episode "Eye of the Beholder".
- The title of the episode comes from the John Irving novel The Cider House Rules.
- Bender paraphrases a line from Irving's novel when he says to the children: "Goodnight, you princes of Maine, you kings of New New England."

== Broadcast and reception ==
In its initial airing, the episode received a Nielsen rating of 3.9, placing it 79th among primetime shows for the week of March 26 - April 1, 2001.
