= Godfellas =

- Futurama episode
- Episode no.: Season 3 Episode 20
- Directed by: Susie Dietter
- Written by: Ken Keeler
- Production code: 3ACV20
- Original air date: March 17, 2002

Episode features
- Opening caption: Please Turn Off All Cell Phones and Tricorders
- Opening cartoon: Private Snafu in "Censored" by Warner Bros. Cartoons (1944)

Episode chronology
← Previous "Roswell That Ends Well"	Next → "Future Stock"
- Futurama season 3

"Godfellas" is the twentieth episode of the third season of the American animated television series Futurama, and the 52nd episode of the series overall. It first aired on the Fox Network in the United States on March 17, 2002. After Bender is shot out of the Planet Express ship, he becomes the god of a tiny civilization that crash lands on his body. The episode was written by Ken Keeler and directed by Susie Dietter. "Godfellas" has received universal acclaim, and won the first Writers Guild of America Award for animation.

The episode has been discussed in the context of various religious issues; it also has been recommended by Christian youth groups as a way to initiate discussion about spirituality and faith.

== Plot ==
During a space pirate attack, Bender is accidentally fired into space. Because Bender was launched when the ship was at its top speed, it is impossible to catch up with him. After an asteroid crashes into Bender, a civilization of tiny humanoid "Shrimpkins" grows on him and worships him as a god. Bender enjoys his new-found status, picking a prophet named Malachi. The Shrimpkins begin praying for rain, sun and wealth, and Bender attempts to heed their prayers, failing and unintentionally harming the Shrimpkins in the process. Malachi tells him that the Shrimpkins who migrated to his buttocks feel their prayers are unheeded and have become atheists. The atheists threaten war with Bender's worshipers. Bender, horrified that his previous attempts to help the Shrimpkins only harmed them, refuses to intervene. The micro-civilization is destroyed when the Shrimpkin factions launch atomic weapons out of Bender's nuclear piles.

Bender continues floating through space until he encounters a cosmic entity. During their time together, the entity tells Bender that it has had much the same experience with helping those who pray to it, and has given up on directly interfering in its worshippers' lives. It now uses a "light touch", which it compares to safecracking, pickpocketing, or (as Bender adds) insurance fraud. Bender asks if he can be sent back to Earth, but the entity claims that it does not know where Earth is. Meanwhile, Fry and Leela search for a way to locate Bender, which leads them to a sect of monks who use a radio telescope to search for God in space. Leela locks up the pacifist monks and Fry spends the next three days searching for Bender. Leela convinces him to give up the search, considering the odds of finding Bender astronomical.

Fry spins the telescope's trackball and finds the cosmic entity by accident as he wishes out loud he had Bender back. The entity hears him and flings Bender toward Earth, where he lands just outside the monastery. Bender recounts his tale, while Fry is reluctant to return to the monastery and claims that their God will surely help the monks. Bender tells them that God cannot be counted on, and demands they rescue the monks themselves. The cosmic entity chuckles and repeats advice it gave to Bender earlier: "When you do things right, people won't be sure you've done anything at all."

== Production ==
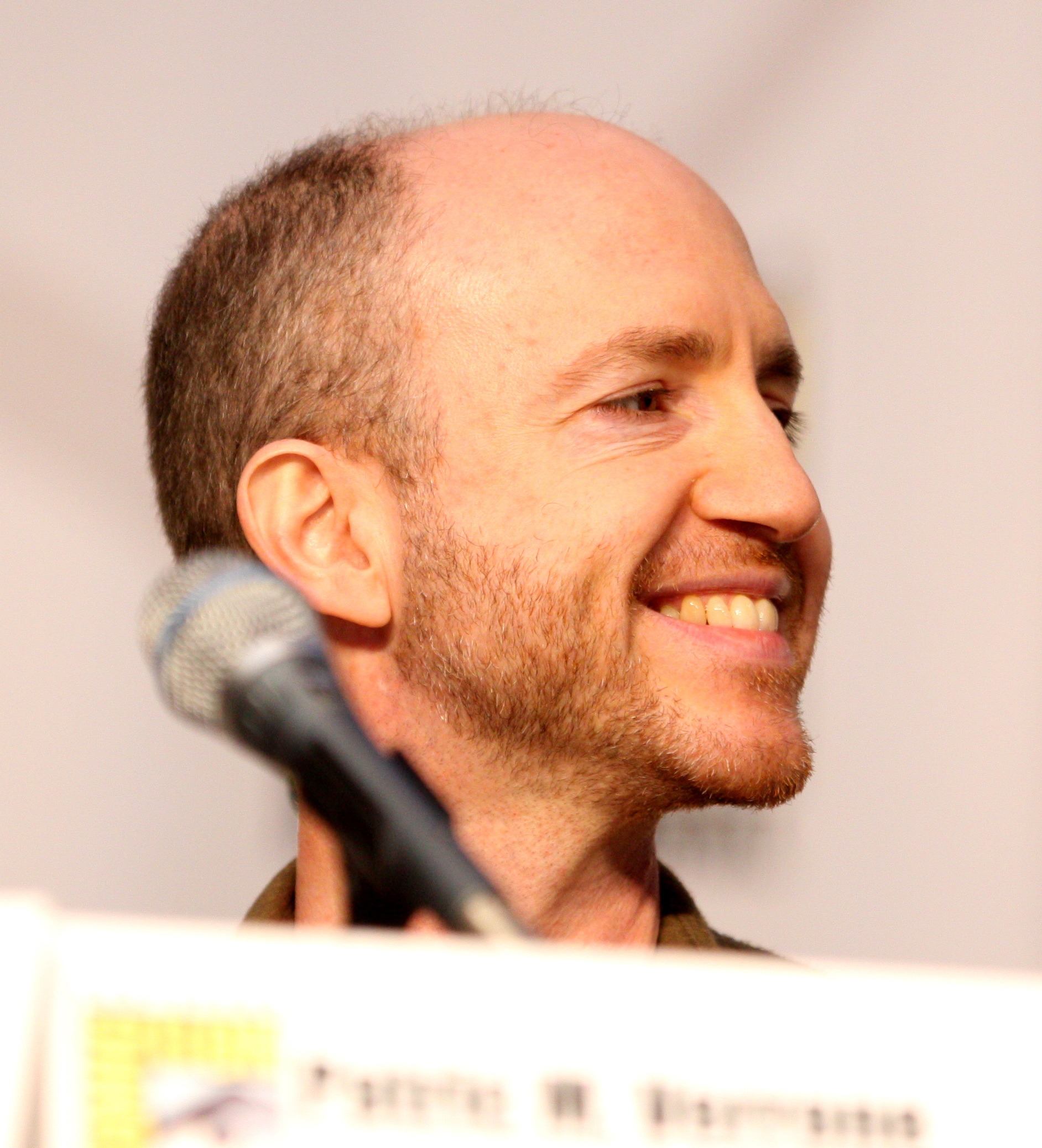
Ken Keeler wrote the episode.

"Godfellas" was written by Ken Keeler, and directed by Susie Dietter. Billy West, who voices series protagonist Fry, as well as "God", based the voice of the latter on Vic Perrin's "Control Voice" from The Outer Limits.

== Themes ==
"Godfellas" touches on the ideas of predestination, prayer, an inactive creator god, and the nature of salvation, in what theology writer Mark Pinsky referred to as a theological turn to the episode, which may cause the viewer to need "to be reminded that this is a cartoon and not a divinity school class". By the end of the conversation, Bender's questions still have not been fully answered and like many of the conversations between humans and God in the Bible, Bender is left wanting more from the voice than it has given him. Pinsky also notes that the monks visited by Fry and Leela occupy the monastery of "Teshuvah", which is the Hebrew word for repentance.

The book Toons That Teach, a text used by Christian youth groups to teach teenagers about spirituality, recommends this episode in a lesson teaching about "Faith, God's Will, [and] Image of God".

== Cultural references ==
The first half of this episode explores themes similar to "Microcosmic God" by Theodore Sturgeon, in which a small race of beings worship their human creator as a God, earnestly carrying out his every command. The story has previously inspired episodes of The Twilight Zone and Groening's own The Simpsons.

The observatory located in a monastery is also a reference to "The Nine Billion Names of God" by Arthur C. Clarke.

== Reception and legacy ==
In its initial airing, the episode received a Nielsen rating of 2.6/4, placing it 97th among primetime shows for the week of March 11–17, 2002.

"Godfellas" received high praise upon release. The episode won the first Writers Guild of America Award for animation in 2003, where it competed against animated specials, long form programs and episodic animation. Series creator Matt Groening has cited it as one of the best episodes of the series. The Reno Gazette-Journal called the episode amazing and noted it as one of the prime episodes of the season. Zack Handlen of The A.V. Club gave the episode an A. In 2008, Empire placed Futurama 25th on their list of "The 50 Greatest TV Shows of All Time" and cited "Godfellas" as the show's best episode. In 2013, it was ranked number 7 "as voted on by fans" for Comedy Central's Futurama Fanarama marathon. An accolades list from IGN compiling the 25 best episodes of Futurama placed "Godfellas" in the #1 spot. The review called the episode a "straightforward affair", but praised it for its "excellent commentary on religion and leadership".

"God" later reappears in the season 6 episode "Reincarnation", introducing the viewer to the episode's unique storytelling approach.
