= Future Stock =

- Futurama episode
- Episode no.: Season 3 Episode 21
- Directed by: Brian Sheesley
- Written by: Aaron Ehasz
- Production code: 3ACV21
- Original air date: March 31, 2002

Episode features
- Opening caption: Love It Or Shove It
- Opening cartoon: "Jingle Jangle Jungle" by Famous Studios (1950)

Episode chronology
← Previous "Godfellas"	Next → "The 30% Iron Chef"
- Futurama season 3

"Future Stock" (also known as "Futurestock") is the twenty-first and penultimate episode of the third season of the American animated television series Futurama. It originally aired on the Fox Network in the United States on March 31, 2002. The episode follows Fry, as he meets a sleazy businessman, simply known as That Guy, during a support group meeting, who later takes over Planet Express. Directed by Brian Sheesley, and written by Aaron Ehasz, the episode was well received by critics.

The episode contains multiple cultural references, notably of the 1987 film Wall Street, for which inspired the character of That Guy. That Guy's outfit was based on what series co-creator David X. Cohen thought was the average look of a businessman from the 1980s.

== Plot ==
At a Planet Express stockholders' meeting, Hermes and Professor Farnsworth inform the shareholders that the company is on the verge of bankruptcy and their stock is worthless. Meanwhile, Fry wanders away from the meeting in search of food and finds his way into a support group meeting for cryogenic clients who have been defrosted. Fry meets a sleazy 1980s businessman, known simply as That Guy, who froze himself while awaiting a cure for his terminal "boneitis".

When the Planet Express stockholders decide to vote on a new CEO, Fry nominates That Guy and he beats out the Professor by one vote. That Guy names Fry his new Vice Chairman, and sets out to remake Planet Express by giving it an expensive image overhaul. That Guy spends the company funds on creating the image that Planet Express is a success, despite not having made a delivery since his takeover. That Guy purchases Zoidberg's stocks for a (fresh) sandwich. They voice their concerns to Fry, who reassures them That Guy has all their interests at heart, before That Guy announces that he is selling Planet Express to Mom so she can eliminate them as competitors. Feeling guilty for letting the company go out of business, Fry vows to block the takeover. The takeover is held at the orbiting Intergalactic Stock Exchange, where all Planet Express employees vote against it, but the stock That Guy previously bought gave him a controlling interest and he outvotes them. Mom and her sons vote for the takeover and agree to buy out all outstanding shares in Planet Express at the current market price of $107 a share, which the crew discovers will make them all rich.

Before the final approval can take place, That Guy suddenly succumbs to his boneitis, having forgotten to cure the disease, and dies, leaving Fry in control of his shares. Fry then makes a speech, telling of how money is valueless compared to friendship. The crew try to stop Fry from doing the right thing and sell the company for their financial gain, but as a result of his speech, the stock price gradually crashes down until it reached $0.03 a share. Since they will all now be poor either way, Fry votes against the deal. The staff leaves to spend the weekend in disappointment over the loss of their potential wealth, with Fry content in saving Planet Express.

== Production ==
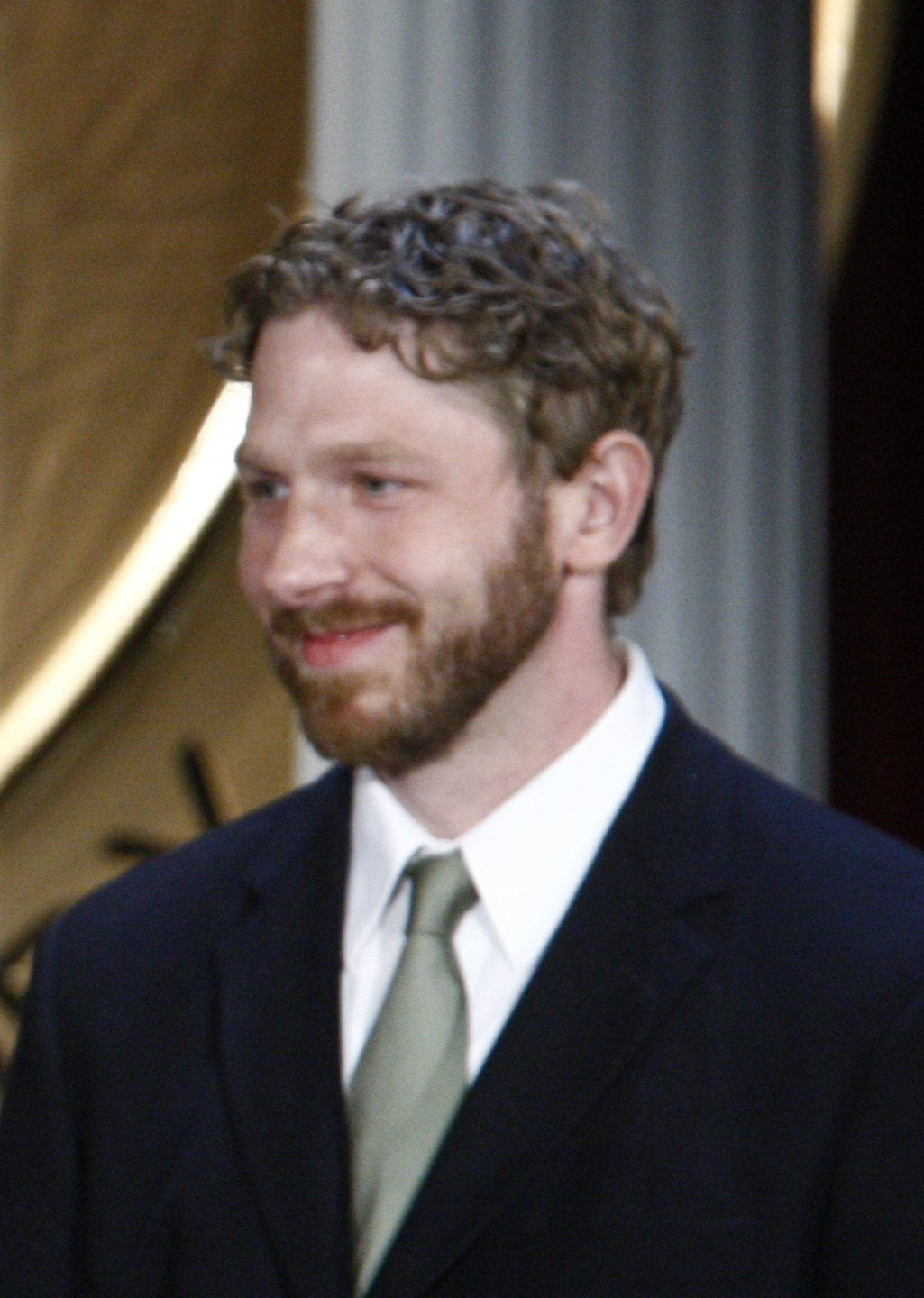
Aaron Ehasz (pictured) wrote the episode.

"Future Stock" was directed by Brian Sheesley, and written by Aaron Ehasz. The voice for That Guy was provided by frequent guest actor David Herman. During the commercial that Hermes presents for the stock brokers, there are two shots of a computer animated Planet Express ship. To achieve this, the animators created the model of the ship with one file, and split it into two sections, which were then added to the 2D animated sequences. That Guy was originally named Steve Castle in an early draft of the episode, but it was cut for simplicity. The outfit that That Guy wears throughout the episode was modeled after what series co-creator David X. Cohen thought was the average look of a 1980s businessman. When Fry moons Mom, she originally responded with "You call that an anus?", but the line was cut for censorship, a decision which John DiMaggio asserts his opposition for in the episode's DVD commentary.

To create the crowd shot during the 'Big Ape Fight' scene, the animators would draw a model of non-moving onlookers in Photoshop, and then animate the moving ones later, layering them on top of each other to look natural. The writers decided to "be careful" with the stock gags shown when the Planet Express crew visit the Intergalactic Stock Exchange, as to add extra subtle jokes, particularly mocking Macintosh. The animators "went out of [their] way" to add more "gizmos", to match the '1980s-esque tone of the episode. While still played in a comedic sense, an original draft of the episode had the scene of That Guy succumbing to his boneitis be "more extreme". Series co-creator Matt Groening said he was "incredibly confused" by the episode's ending at first, due to the complex nature of the shares plot.

== Cultural references ==
"Future Stock" contains various references to popular culture, particularly to various forms of film, music, and television. The title is wordplay on Future Shock, a book written by the futurist Alvin Toffler in 1970. The Planet Express advert, in which a woman hurls a Planet Express box at a giant glass screen with Mom on it, is a parody of the famous 1984 television advert that introduced the Apple Macintosh. At 'The Big Ape Fight', Calculon uses a similar line from the original Planet of the Apes film in the style of Charlton Heston.

The episode also references the 1987 film Wall Street, with That Guy being based on Gordon Gekko, a character from the aforementioned film. The suits that Fry and That Guy wear when they are given control of the company were also inspired from Wall Street. When informed of their worthless stock, Leela exclaims "This toads the wet sprocket", a nod to the alternative rock band Toad the Wet Sprocket. Fry and That Guy sing "The Safety Dance" by Men Without Hats when they first meet at the support group meeting. Professor Farnsworth mentions the drug Poli-Grip. Scruffy, the Planet Express building's janitor, reads a pornographic parody of National Geographic, "National Pornographic". That Guy is seen with a Miami Vice themed lunch box.

== Broadcast and reception ==
"Future Stock is mostly just an excuse for jokes about how much businessmen in the ‘80s were assholes…And it’s a damn fun episode, with a terrific central villain, a smart use of Mom and her trio of idiot sons, and a modestly clever plot. This one relies on some knowledge of stock trading to really grasp its rich complexities, but fortunately…the script explains everything just as much as it needs to be explained for the plot to make sense."

— Zack Handlen's review of the episode for The A.V. Club.

In its initial airing, "Future Stock" finished 94th in the Nielsen ratings among primetime shows for the week of March 25–31, 2002. It received a Nielsen rating of 2.7/6, equivalent to 4.79 million viewers.

Since airing, the episode has received positive reception from critics. It was given an A by The A.V. Club. The review highlighted the death of That Guy, which it called "hilarious", and its "gratifyingly smart" conclusion.

In 2023, Vulture named "Future Stock" as the thirteenth best episode of Futurama, joking that "One day, we will find a cure for terminal boneitis".
