= A Leela of Her Own =

- Futurama episode
- Episode no.: Season 3 Episode 16
- Directed by: Swinton Scott
- Written by: Patric M. Verrone
- Production code: 3ACV16
- Original air date: April 7, 2002

Guest appearances
- Bob Uecker as himself; Hank Aaron as himself and Hank Aaron XXIV; Tom Kenny as Abner Doubledeal

Episode features
- Opening caption: Scratch Here To Reveal Prize
- Opening cartoon: "The Goal Rush" by Fleischer and Famous Studios (1946)

Episode chronology
← Previous "I Dated a Robot"	Next → "A Pharaoh to Remember"
- Futurama season 3

"A Leela of Her Own" is the sixteenth episode in the third season of the American animated television series Futurama, and the 48th episode of the series overall. The episode is a homage to A League of Their Own. It originally aired on the Fox network in the United States on April 7, 2002. Bob Uecker provided the voice of himself, Tom Kenny provided the voice of Abner Doubledeal, and Hank Aaron guest starred as himself and Hank Aaron XXIV.

== Plot ==
A new pizza restaurant run by Cygnoids has moved in across the street from the Planet Express building. Leela convinces the others that they should go to greet their new neighbors. They find that the Cygnoids have much to learn about Earth customs. Fry tries to help them get adjusted, first by giving them advice on how not to make pizza (such as not using live bees as an ingredient, not crushing rats to make wine, and not letting their relatives live in the pizza oven when not in use) and then by suggesting that they learn to play blernsball (the 30th-century version of baseball as seen in "Fear of a Bot Planet").

The Planet Express staff and the Cygnoids form teams and go to a blernsball diamond in a nearby park. While playing blernsball with the Cygnoids, Leela's lack of depth perception causes her to injure opposing players by beaning them in the head. Gaining notice from Abner Doubledeal, the owner of the New New York Mets, who thinks that having a one-eyed woman repeatedly bean opposing players would be a good novelty act, she becomes the first female player to play professional blernsball. Leela sees herself as a pioneer for women in sports, but Jackie Anderson, a female star for a college blernsball team, tells her that she is an embarrassment who is making it harder for legitimate female athletes to be taken seriously. Leela is on the fast track to becoming the worst blernsball player ever and seeks help to prevent that by enlisting Hank Aaron XXIV, a distant relative of Hank Aaron and currently considered the worst blernsball player of all time. After taking his advice, she throws a strike and is delighted.

During the last game of the season, the Cygnoids sell their pizza in the stadium and their franchise is bought by Fishy Joe. With the Mets leading in the bottom of the ninth inning and two out, Leela pleads to be put in the game, explaining that she has been training with Hank Aaron. The manager gives in and Leela pitches to Jackie Anderson, who is making her professional debut. Leela throws two strikes, but on the third pitch Jackie hits a grand slam and wins the game.

Leela walks away, unhappy until Jackie tells her that she really was a role model after all, since she encouraged women to try harder than ever in order to prove they were not as bad as her. Meanwhile, at the blernsball museum, Hank Aaron XXIV sadly leaves his post as the worst blernsball player ever (now occupied by a cardboard cutout of Leela), with the head of the original Hank Aaron consoling him by reminding him that he is still the worst football player ever.

== Broadcast and reception ==
In its original airing, the episode received a Nielsen rating of 3.0/9, placing it 89th among primetime shows for the week of April 1–7, 2002. Zack Handlen of The A.V. Club gave the episode a B+.
