= Time Keeps On Slippin' =

- Futurama episode
- Episode no.: Season 3 Episode 14
- Directed by: Chris Loudon
- Written by: Ken Keeler
- Production code: 3ACV14
- Original air date: May 6, 2001

Guest appearance
- Jeff Cesario as Marv Albert's head

Episode features
- Opening caption: For Proper Viewing, Take Red Pill Now
- Opening cartoon: "The Clown's Little Brother" (1920)

Episode chronology
← Previous "Bendin' in the Wind"	Next → "I Dated a Robot"
- Futurama season 3

"Time Keeps On Slippin'" is the fourteenth episode in the third season of the American animated television series Futurama, and the 46th episode of the series overall. It originally aired on the Fox network in the United States on May 6, 2001. The title is from a lyric in "Fly Like an Eagle" by Steve Miller Band. Basketball and time travel play a prominent role in this episode.

== Plot ==
Representatives from the Globetrotter homeworld land in Central Park and challenge Earth's honor on the basketball court, for no apparent reason. Professor Farnsworth accepts the Globetrotters' challenge, resolving to create a team of mutant atomic supermen to take them on. When he completes his work, he is left with a team of mutant infants which necessitates the Professor sending the crew to gather chronitons to accelerate their growth. Bender's objection that the particles in question were responsible for the destruction of an entire civilization is ignored. All the while, Fry is trying to woo an unreceptive Leela.

The crew returns with the chronitons, and the mutants' growth is successfully accelerated. The game proceeds, with Farnsworth's team of mutants maintaining a lead over the Globetrotters. But at the start of the second half, time begins inexplicably jumping forward. The Professor calls a timeout during which one of the atomic supermen is killed and Fry joins the team. Although the Earth team holds a substantial lead, and there are only two minutes left in the game, the Globetrotters win an overwhelming victory during a time skip. The Professor formulates a theory that the crew's collection of chronitons has destabilized space-time, and will lead to the premature destruction of the universe.

With the assistance of the Globetrotters' leader, Ethan "Bubblegum" Tate, Farnsworth builds a "bad ass gravity pump". With the pump, they intend to reposition stars around the source of the problem, thus diverting the time skips to the empty side of the universe. The time skips worked in their favor, with Richard Nixon's Head granting them "all the money on Earth" to build the "bad ass gravity pump" and attach it to the ship. Once they finish moving the required number of stars, Fry begins romancing Leela again, but just as she's refusing him, time skips yet again—to their wedding. Then, as Leela accuses Fry of tricking her into marriage, time skips straight to their divorce. This leaves Fry wondering what he did to win her over. Meanwhile, the time skips are only getting worse, with peoples' entire lives being lived out in only a few seconds.

Meanwhile, Bender tries to persuade Tate to let him join the Globetrotters, but Tate tells Bender the hard truth that he will never be "funky enough" to join the team, causing him to break down in tears.

With the assistance of the other Globetrotters (the greatest scientific minds in the universe), a new plan is devised. The Planet Express crew will use one of Professor Farnsworth's doomsday devices to implode the nebula, creating a black hole which will prevent the further release of chronitons. Fry and Leela have an amicable conversation where Fry apologizes for his actions and agrees that Leela will probably never feel the same way he does about her. Bender releases the doomsday device and Leela, feeling bad for breaking Fry's heart, allows Fry to pilot the ship to safety. As they leave, Fry notices that during one of the time skips, he had spelled out the message "I LOVE YOU, LEELA" with stars, but the message is destroyed by the implosion before Leela can see it. Fry stares sadly out into space while Bender whistles a slow, sad version of "Sweet Georgia Brown".

== Production ==
Ken Keeler used the story "Strange Romance" from the book Y. Cheung, Business Detective by Harry Stephen Keeler (of no relation to Ken Keeler) as the basis for this episode. Marv Albert is portrayed by comedian Jeff Cesario.

== Broadcast and reception ==
In its initial airing, the episode received a Nielsen rating of 3.9/8, placing it 80th among primetime shows for the week of April 30 – May 6, 2001.

In 2006, IGN ranked "Time Keeps On Slippin'" as number 15 in their list of the best episodes of Futurama. The episode is included in the list because of the last scene where Fry's star message "I Love You, Leela" gets destroyed. Although the ending is described as heartbreaking, it still leaves fans looking forward to the future possibilities for Fry and Leela's relationship. Zack Handlen of The A.V. Club gave the episode an A.
