= Bendin' in the Wind =

- Futurama episode
- Episode no.: Season 3 Episode 13
- Directed by: Ron Hughart
- Written by: Eric Horsted
- Production code: 3ACV13
- Original air date: April 22, 2001

Guest appearance
- Beck as himself

Episode features
- Opening caption: Federal Law Prohibits Changing The Channel
- Opening cartoon: "A Coy Decoy" from Looney Tunes by Warner Bros. Cartoons (1941)

Episode chronology
← Previous "The Route of All Evil"	Next → "Time Keeps On Slippin'"
- Futurama season 3

"Bendin' in the Wind" is the thirteenth episode in the third season of the American animated television series Futurama, and the 45th episode of the series overall. It originally aired on the Fox network in the United States on April 22, 2001. It guest-stars Beck as himself. Bender becomes a folksinger after being broken, and starts touring with Beck. The title comes from the Bob Dylan song "Blowin' in the Wind".

== Plot ==
Fry gets a free Volkswagen microbus, excavated from the ruins of Old New York. He pushes it back to the Planet Express office, and has to fuel it with whale oil, which replaced gasoline. While opening a barrel of oil, Bender becomes caught by the opener's magnet and is horribly damaged.

Bender is rushed to a hospital, where the doctor informs him that he will never move again. He falls into a depression, but revives upon finding out that Beck's disembodied head is in the next bed, having checked in to get a mannequin body attached. Beck loans Bender a pair of neck-mounted robotic arms, which Bender uses to scrape across his mangled chest, and invites him to join Beck's tour as a washboard player.

Fry, Leela, Amy, and Dr. Zoidberg pile into Fry's microbus to follow Beck and Bender on tour. During a stop at a laundromat, their money is destroyed in a washing machine, forcing them to live in the vehicle and scavenge for food. However, Zoidberg begins to cough up beautiful blue pearls, which Leela and Amy string together to sell as necklaces. While on tour, Bender is insulted by the treatment of other broken robots and writes a song about them. Together with Beck, he decides to put on a benefit concert in San Francisco to help others like himself.

Fry and the crew catch up with Bender, who is relaxing in a San Francisco hotel. Bender miraculously regains the ability to move on his own, much to everyone's shock, but decides to fake being broken in order to keep his music career going. The concert goes on as planned, but when the time comes for Bender to perform his song, he cannot restrain himself and begins dancing around the stage. Having been found out, Bender runs off with the oversized benefit check in Fry's microbus.

Bender, pursued by an irate Beck, drives the microbus into the San Francisco Bay (due to the Golden Gate Bridge being converted for use by hovercars). Beck catches Bender and recovers the check, but forgives him since Bender has done so much for broken robots. The crew begins to row the microbus back to New New York, and Bender wades after them with a magnet stuck to his head so that he can have one last taste of being a folk singer.

== Broadcast and reception ==
In its initial airing, the episode received a Nielsen rating of 3.6/7, placing it 79th among primetime shows for the week of April 16–22, 2001. Zack Handlen of The A.V. Club gave the episode a B+.
