= Roswell That Ends Well =

- Futurama episode
- Episode no.: Season 3 Episode 19
- Directed by: Rich Moore
- Written by: J. Stewart Burns
- Production code: 3ACV19
- Original air date: December 9, 2001

Episode features
- Opening caption: Fun For The Whole Family (except Grandma and Grandpa)
- Opening cartoon: "Congo Jazz" from Looney Tunes by Harman-Ising Productions (1930)

Episode chronology
← Previous "Anthology of Interest II"	Next → "Godfellas"
- Futurama season 3

"Roswell That Ends Well" is the nineteenth episode in the third season of the American animated television series Futurama, and the 51st episode of the series overall. It originally aired on the Fox network in the United States on December 9, 2001. The plot centers on an accidental time travel event that results in the main characters participating in the Roswell Incident in 1947.

The episode was written by J. Stewart Burns and directed by Rich Moore. "Roswell That Ends Well" scored a Nielsen rating of 3.1 during its original broadcast, and it received acclaim from television critics, with many hailing it as one of the best episodes of Futurama. It won an Emmy Award for Outstanding Animated Program (Programming Less Than One Hour) in 2002.

== Plot ==
As the crew watch a supernova, Fry foolishly puts a metal pan of popcorn into the ship's microwave oven. The radiation causes the pan to emit sparks, which interact with the particles thrown off by the supernova and send the ship back to 1947. Since GPS technology does not yet exist in this time period, the crew have no way to navigate the ship accurately and crash-land in Roswell, New Mexico. Refusing to wear a seat belt like the rest of the crew, Bender is flung through the windshield on impact and smashed to pieces. The crew and Bender's disembodied head seek out a way to return to the 31st century, leaving Zoidberg behind to pick up the pieces. Zoidberg is captured by the U.S. military and taken to Roswell Air Base for experimentation. Assuming the pieces are the remnants of a flying saucer, the military "reconstructs" Bender's body as such.

Meanwhile, the microwave oven needed to return to the future has been destroyed and a replacement is not yet commercially available. A microwave antenna from the army base would work as a viable alternative, but Professor Farnsworth warns that stealing it could change history. He likewise warns Fry against visiting his grandfather, Enos, who is stationed at the base, as he might kill Enos and erase his own existence. However, Farnsworth's advice has the opposite effect; Fry becomes determined to seek out Enos and encourage him to pursue a sexual relationship with his fiancée Mildred. After several bumbling attempts to keep Enos safe (as well as discovering that Enos is a latent homosexual), Fry resorts to locking him in an abandoned house. The house turns out to be located in the middle of a nuclear weapon testing range, and Enos is killed in a bomb test.

When Fry visits Mildred to console her on Enos' death, she begins to seduce him. Realizing that his existence has not been erased, he concludes that she cannot be his grandmother. The two have sex that night and are found by the rest of the crew the following morning. Seeing that Mildred has begun to act like his grandmother, Fry panics after Farnsworth tells him that he has become his own grandfather.

With time running out, Farnsworth decides that secrecy is no longer important and the crew storm Roswell Air Base by force to get the microwave dish, throwing the entire complex into disarray. Fry and Leela rescue Zoidberg from an alien autopsy while Farnsworth grabs Bender's body. As the ship leaves Earth's atmosphere and triggers the microwave dish for the time jump, Bender's head falls out and has to be left behind in 1947. Back in the 31st century, Fry laments the loss of Bender, until he realizes that his head must still be where it landed in New Mexico. The crew return to Roswell's ruins with a metal detector and dig up the head, still intact and functioning. They attach it to Bender's still-mangled, hovering, "UFO" body and return to New New York, content that their misadventures in 1947 have not changed history in any way.

== Production ==
The writing team came up with the idea for this episode when they were planning the three plot lines for "Anthology of Interest II". As the idea developed they eventually had so much material for it that they broke it out as a separate episode. The reason the concept was originally under consideration for the "What if..." scenario was that when Groening and Cohen originally created Futurama they decided there would not be any time travel; however they changed their mind and decided to go forward with the idea. The writers did not want to create a situation that would leave fans wondering why the Planet Express crew could not simply travel through time on a regular basis. For this purpose they chose to have it occur unintentionally during a supernova as that was deemed to be a suitably rare occurrence. Futurama has returned to the theme of time travel four times since: in Futurama: Bender's Big Score, although the cause of time travel is different; in "All the Presidents' Heads", although the cause of time travel is again different; in "The Late Philip J. Fry", which involves a time machine that can only travel forwards in time – to specifically avoid creating a paradox; and in "I Know What You Did Next Xmas", involving a time machine that can travel both forwards and backwards in time.

In this episode, director Rich Moore used screen position and character movement to mimic the time travel aspects of the plot. In the planning stages it was decided that actions that played to screen left would represent events from the past or a setback to the plot. Likewise, screen right indicated progress or moving past their problems.

== Cultural references ==
TV critic Rob Owen perceived the episode to have touched upon many of the plot devices and themes commonly seen in time travel stories, most notably the Back to the Future and Terminator movies. The episode also shares much in common with the Star Trek: Deep Space Nine episode "Little Green Men". Bender's head lying buried in the sand for centuries recalls the same thing happening to the android Data's head in the Star Trek: The Next Generation episode "Time's Arrow". The episode also features a digital clock resembling the ones used for the DeLorean time machine, as well as a clock resembling a cat from Back to the Future.

Much of Enos' character is taken from Gomer Pyle, such as his accent and use of Pyle's trademark "Go-oooly!", which was parodied as "Gadzooks!".

== Broadcast and reception ==
The episode won an Emmy Award in the Outstanding Animated Program (Programming Less Than One Hour) category in 2002, marking Futurama's first win in this category. Rich Moore also won an Annie Award for "Directing in an Animated Television Production" in 2002 and in 2006, IGN ranked the episode as the sixth best Futurama episode. In 2013, they reassessed the list and upgraded it to third best. In 2001, executive producer David X. Cohen noted that this was one of his favorite episodes of the series. Sci Fi Weekly gave the episode an "A" grade and noted that it was "a half hour of pure entertainment". Zack Handlen of The A.V. Club gave the episode an A. This episode is one of four featured in the Monster Robot Maniac Fun Collection, marking it as one of Matt Groening's favorite episodes from the series. Claudia Katz, producer of Futurama, has also stated that this is one of her three favorite episodes of the series. In 2013, it was ranked number 5 "as voted on by fans" for Comedy Central's Futurama Fanarama marathon. Although the episode was well received by critics, it continued to do poorly in its time slot. The original airing was in 83rd place for the week with a 3.1 rating/5 share.

== See also ==
- "Ouroboros" (Red Dwarf)
