= Brian Sheesley =

American animation director (born 1967)

Brian Sheesley (born April 14, 1967) is an American animation director who has worked on several comedy shows, including directing duties on The Grim Adventures of Billy & Mandy, two episodes of The Critic, nine episodes of Futurama and two episodes of King of the Hill. Sheesley also worked as an animation timer on Rugrats Go Wild in 2003 and as an animator on A Wish for Wings That Work in 1991. In his earlier career Brian worked as a layout artist on The Ren & Stimpy Show. Brian was an animation director and supervising director on Camp Lazlo, and recently an animation director on Regular Show, Sym-Bionic Titan and Uncle Grandpa. He studied in the Character Animation program at the California Institute of the Arts. He also worked on The Simpsons in 1996, as an animation timer.

== Directing credits ==
=== The Critic episodes ===
- "Eyes on the Prize"
- "Sherman of Arabia"

=== King of the Hill episodes ===
- Westie Side Story
- How I Learned to Stop Worrying and Love the Alamo

=== Futurama episodes ===
- "Love's Labours Lost in Space"
- "When Aliens Attack"
- "Why Must I Be a Crustacean in Love?"
- "Mother's Day"
- "Amazon Women in the Mood"
- "Love and Rocket"
- "Future Stock"
- "The Route of All Evil"
- "The Sting"

=== Other projects ===
- Mighty Mouse: The New Adventures
- Klutter!
- Zoot Rumpus (pilot)
- The Grim Adventures of Billy & Mandy
- Fanboy & Chum Chum
- Dan Vs.
- Sym-Bionic Titan
- Regular Show
- Uncle Grandpa
- Danger & Eggs
- Camp Lazlo
