= Bender (Futurama) =

Futurama character

- Futurama character
- First appearance: "Space Pilot 3000" (1999)
- Created by: Matt Groening; David X. Cohen
- Designed by: Matt Groening
- Voiced by: John DiMaggio

In-universe information
- Full name: Bender Bending Rodríguez
- Aliases: B.B. Rodriquez; Coilette; Titanius Anglesmith; Ramblin' Rodriguez; Young Biddy; Boiler; Drunken Garbage Can; Boogerbot; Blotto; Super King; Hyper Lord
- Species: Bending Industrial Robot
- Gender: Male
- Title(s): Bender the Offender; The Gender Bender; Super King
- Occupation: Assistant Manager of Sales & Chef at Planet Express; Suicide booth construction worker (formerly); Pharaoh of Osiris IV (formerly); Superhero (formerly); General (formerly); Photographer; Soldier (formerly)
- Family: Abuelatron (grandmother); One unnamed older brother One unnamed younger brother Hermes Conrad (inspector)
- Significant others: Countess De La Roca (ex-girlfriend, deceased); Angleyne (ex-girlfriend); Planet Express Ship (ex-girlfriend); Calculon (ex-fiancé); Amy Wong (ex-fiancée); Lynn (ex-girlfriend); Bev (ex-girlfriend)
- Children: Unnamed Son (son); Ben Rodríguez (son); Baby Beers
- Relatives: Vladimir (deceased uncle); Tandy (cousin); Doblando (cousin)
- Origin: Tijuana, Mexico (Earth)

Bender Bending Rodríguez (designated in-universe as Bending Unit 22, unit number 1,729, serial number 2716057) is a fictional character and one of the main protagonists in the animated television series Futurama. He was conceived by the series' creators Matt Groening and David X. Cohen, and is voiced by John DiMaggio. He fulfills a comical, antihero-type role in the show, and is described by fellow character Leela as an "alcoholic, whore-mongering, chain-smoking gambler".

According to the character's backstory, Bender was built in Tijuana, Mexico (the other characters refer to his "swarthy Latin charm"), his name a reference to bending in Mexican maquiladoras.

Bender is known for being prejudiced against non-robots. For example, one of his signature expressions is "kill all humans". Those who are not subject to Bender's prejudicial attitude are documented on his "Do Not Kill" list, which includes only his best friend Philip J. Fry and his colleague Hermes Conrad (added after the episode "Lethal Inspection"). However, Bender is also occasionally portrayed as possessing a sympathetic side, suggesting that he is not as belligerent as he claims, a view often echoed by his friends.

== Character biography ==
Bender, a high-tech industrial metalworking robot, was built in 2996 at Fábrica Robótica De La Madre (Spanish: "Mom's Robot Factory"), a manufacturing facility of Mom's Friendly Robot Company in Tijuana, Mexico. However, the story of his construction remains a mystery. Although different creation processes have been shown, Cohen has stated that the viewer has only been shown Bender emerging from the machine that created him, while what happened inside the machine has not yet been revealed. According to one version, suggested by Hermes' flashback, and also by a reverse aging process shown in the episode "Teenage Mutant Leela's Hurdles", a newborn Bender possessed a baby-like body. In "Bendless Love", however, Bender is portrayed with a normal, adult-sized body in a flashback sequence conveying his memory of coming into existence. As Bender's memory chip contains an adult form, the episode's content suggests that the character might actually be recalling a transfer to an adult body, rather than the moment of creation.

Unlike most other robots, Bender is mortal and, according to Professor Farnsworth's calculations, may have less than one billion years to live. Because of a manufacturing error that left Bender without a backup unit, Bender's memory cannot be transferred or uploaded to another robot body. After reporting that defect to his manufacturer, Bender barely escapes death from a guided missile and a robot death squad dispatched by Mom in order to eliminate him and effectively take the defective product off the market.

At the factory, Bender was programmed for cold-bending structural steel. Bender later attended Bending State University, where he majored in bending and minored in Robo-American Studies. At the university, he was a member of Epsilon Rho Rho (ERR), a robot fraternity, where he became something of a fraternity hero for his many shenanigans: one night he chugged an entire keg of beer, streaked across campus, and stuffed 58 people into a telephone booth (although he concedes they were mostly children).

Before meeting Fry and Leela and joining Planet Express (where he currently works as the assistant manager of sales and as company chef), Bender had a job at the metalworking factory, bending steel girders for the construction of suicide booths.

Bender has an apartment (00100100, the ASCII code in binary for the dollar sign "$") in the "Robot Arms Apts." building, where he eventually invites his best friend and coworker, Fry, to live with him. Although the pair enjoy living together, Bender is sometimes portrayed as manipulating his guileless friend. In the series' early episodes, Bender is shown preferring to occupy smaller areas of their apartment, like the closet, referring to them as "cozy", although in later episodes he is shown to have his own individual bedroom, like Fry.

Throughout the series, he enters many romantic relationships of varying duration, and is commonly referred to as a womanizer by his friends. He does not seem to discriminate between human women and their robot or "fem-bot" counterparts, and is shown actively pursuing both. Likewise, his taste in fem-bot partners does not seem to be affected by the fem-bot's height or weight, and he is shown numerous times chasing fem-bots of all builds. In "Proposition Infinity", Bender's secret affair with coworker Amy Wong leads to a referendum that, once approved, legalizes robosexuality. In "The Bots and the Bees", he has a sexual encounter with a fem-bot soda vending machine that leads to the almost-instantaneous birth of a son, whom he names Ben, after the first part of his own name.

Professor Farnsworth describes Bender to be constructed of an alloy of iron and osmium - despite Bender himself claiming to be made of 40% titanium in "A Head in the Polls". The Professor also states Bender contains a 0.04% nickel impurity, a trait which he claimed made himself unique. Bender hates magnets, as magnets interfere with his inhibition unit, causing him to uncontrollably start singing folk music/folk songs when near his head, and also causing him to reveal his secret ambition to be a folk singer. He once was able to attach a magnetic small faux-beard underneath his mouth without breaking into song. Bender also has a near-pathological fear of electric can openers due to the death of his father, caused by one, and the fact that it once ripped open the top of his head as it would a can.

== Character ==
=== Creation ===
The name Bender was chosen by creator Matt Groening as an homage to John Bender (played by Judd Nelson), a character in The Breakfast Club. In that film, John Bender told Principal Vernon (Paul Gleason), "Eat my shorts," an eventual catchphrase for another Groening creation, Bart Simpson.

Bender's visual design went through multiple changes before reaching its final state. One of the decisions which Groening found to be particularly difficult was whether Bender's head should be square or round. Initially he worked under the idea that all robots would have square heads in the year 3000; however, it was later decided that Bender's head should be round, a visual play on the idea that Bender is a "round peg in a square hole".

=== Voice ===
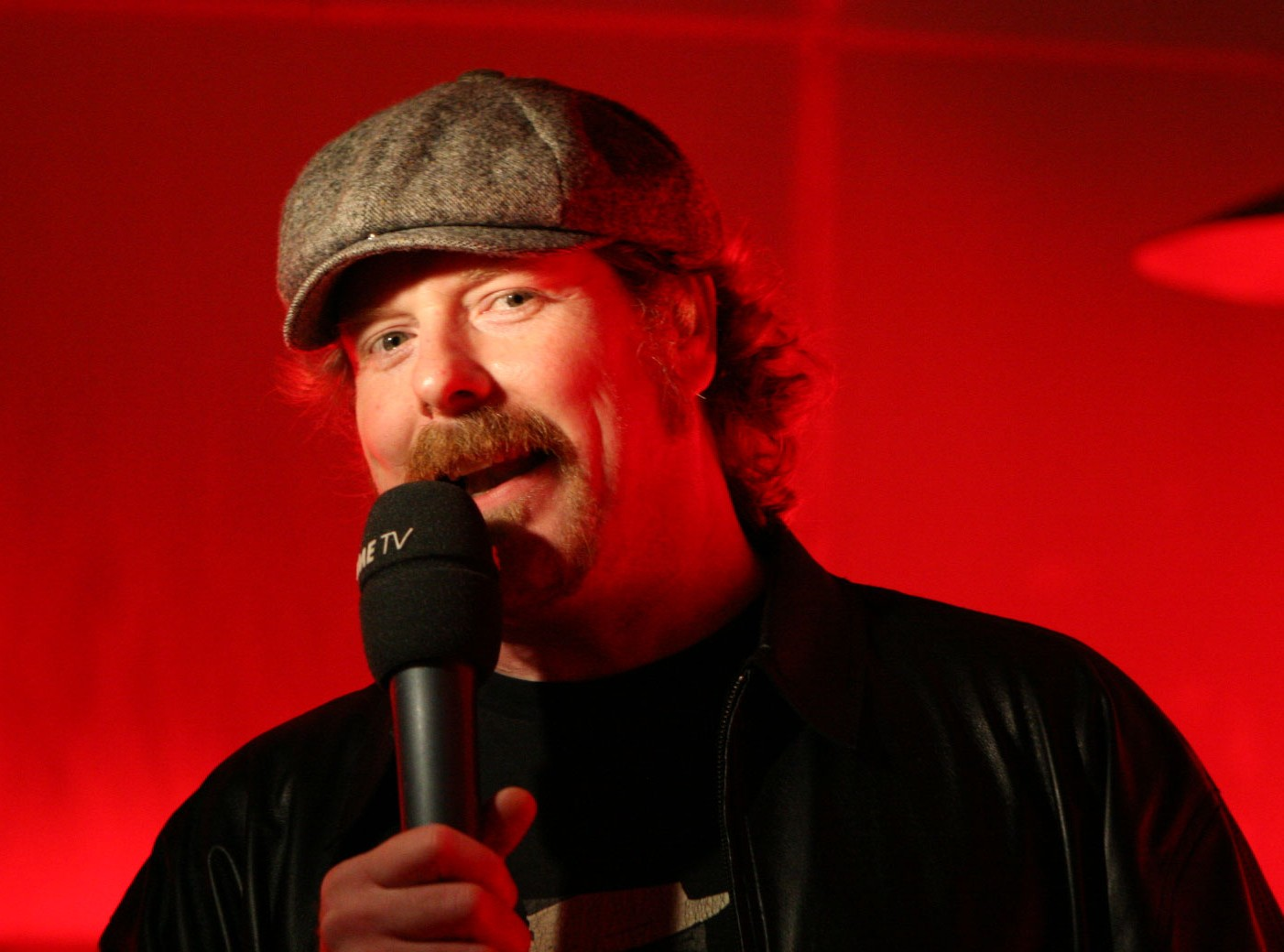
DiMaggio at E3 2008

When casting for Futurama, Bender's voice was the most difficult to cast, in part because the show's creators had not yet decided what robots should sound like. Because of this, every voice actor who auditioned, no matter for what role, was also asked to read for Bender. After about 300 auditions, even series co-creator Cohen attempted to audition after being told he sounded like a robot. John DiMaggio was eventually chosen for the role after his second audition.

DiMaggio originally auditioned using his Bender voice for the role of Professor Farnsworth and also used a voice later used for URL the police robot for Bender. He describes the voice he got the part with as a combination of a sloppy drunk, Slim Pickens, and a character one of his college friends created named "Charlie the sausage-lover". Casting directors liked that he made the character sound like a drunk, rather than an automaton. DiMaggio has noted that he had difficulty singing as Bender in "Hell Is Other Robots" because he was forced to sing the harmony part in a low key.

On March 1, 2022, following publicized contract negotiations, DiMaggio confirmed he would reprise his role for the Hulu revival.

== Design ==
Bender's factory-set height is just over 6 feet (1.8 m) tall, including his antenna, and just under it without. In "The Farnsworth Parabox", Bender states that he flipped a coin to decide his color, ending up with foghat gray rather than gold. In "The Cyber House Rules", Bender shows the kids a black-and-white mug shot of himself taken after his arrest for theft. In "Time Keeps on Slippin'", Bender is shown trying to join a basketball team and makes himself taller by simply extending his legs. His body has a "shiny metal ass", two legs, two "Extens-o-matic" arms (right called "Gropie" and left "Cheatie" by Bender) with three fingers each, a head with two replaceable eyes shaped like light-emitting diodes, and a mouth used for fuel intake and voice communication. In "Bender Gets Made", Bender claims he also has a nose, but he chooses not to wear it. Bender's human-like characteristics are reinforced by his display of behaviors often regarded as exclusive to humans, such as whistling, snoring, having bloodshot eyes, crying, feeling physical attraction, being tickled, dreaming, and belching.

Other bending units of the same model as Bender, such as Flexo, share the same hardware design, but differ in terms of their personality and behavior. For example, Flexo shows personality traits similar to those of Bender but is not quite as "evil" as Bender. In the episode "Mother's Day", Leela looks through a simulation of a bending unit's sight, which targets potential rubes and then denotes a plan to rob them and leave them in a ditch, implying that all bending robots are somewhat prone to theft and amoral by design. However, another unit, Billy West (named after the series voice actor of the same name), is helpful and kind, though he lives as a farmer on the Moon and insists on not being a bending unit.

Bender's serial number, 2716057, can be expressed as the sum of two cubes (952^{3} + (-951)^{3}), which is humorous to Bender and Flexo after Flexo reveals that his serial number (3370318) has the same characteristic (119^{3} + 119^{3}) (also, Bender's designation 1729 is a taxicab number).

=== Functions ===
Bender was designed specifically for the relatively simple task of bending straight metal girders into various angles. Despite this apparent simplicity, he possesses numerous features superfluous to his original purpose, which become more apparent after an electric jolt to his antenna from an overhead light socket in the pilot episode. The scope of Bender's functionality is impressive; he often acts as if he were a multifunctional gadget rather than a special bending machine. Similar to a contemporary computer, he hosts a number of input/output devices: his head has a data socket and remotely operated volume control. His body has a socket for a microphone jack, a dual-socket power receptacle, a reset button, a kill switch, and a self-destruct button. Having the hardware-based self-destruct control on his body, rather than in his software, prevents Bender from killing himself in "A Head in the Polls" when he pawns everything but his head, grows desperate without it and desires to kill himself.

Bender is capable of disassembling and reassembling his body at will and operating each detached body part individually and remotely, presumably by using his transmitter and antenna to send wireless signals. His head can be used for a wide range of functions, whether attached to his body or not. In one episode, Leela reassembles Bender into a functioning go-kart (albeit in an event shown in the "What-If" machine).

Bender uses his chest cavity as a locker, which seems to store much more than is physically possible; it is often used to store heads in jars, small children, alcohol, money, loot, the world's last darkroom, and, on a few occasions, Fry. In "The Route of All Evil", the cavity was also used as a boil kettle, hopback and fermentation tank to produce home-made beer. Upon inspection of his body, it appears to be empty, though devices like the F-Ray reveal that, despite appearing hollow, Bender's body contains gears and other robotic components.

Being an electronic machine, he can perform quick mathematical calculations.

=== Build ===
As a bending unit, Bender possesses extraordinary strength, which he often demonstrates by lifting heavy objects, smashing through walls, and even bending an enormous steel girder marked "UNBENDABLE" (in "Bendless Love"). His mechanical nature also makes him far more durable than the rest of the cast, capable of surviving gunfire, explosions, extreme heat, deep water, or hard vacuum.

Even when his body is seemingly destroyed or completely detached from his head, it has no effect on Bender's ability to think and communicate, indicating that his main processing facilities are located in his head. Bender's hardware is controlled by a factory-loaded operating system, which reboots upon incidental shutdown and automatically adjusts its settings to the environment detected at the time of rebooting. For example, in "The Birdbot of Ice-Catraz", when Bender reboots, his visual sensors detect a colony of penguins, prompting his boot loader to re-initialize him with penguin-like behavior and language.

He is equipped with a vast capacity of computer data storage, in excess of 100,001 terabytes: 1 TB for general storage and 100,000 TB for the storage of pornography, though in "Overclockwise" Cubert Farnsworth deletes 12 TB of outdated catchphrases from Bender. Presumably either Bender has a separate "catchphrase drive" or the majority of the catchphrases are also pornographic.

=== Source of energy ===
Bender is powered by alcohol-based fuels, which he can convert into an electrical power source sufficient to operate not only himself, but also small household appliances plugged into his power receptacle. Low alcohol intake levels decrease his production of electricity: when he stops drinking and begins to "sober", his behavior grows increasingly ebrious and dysfunctional, and he grows a red beard of rust. He is also, apparently, able to sustain himself by consuming mineral oil, though he considers this to be only 'functional'.

Due to Professor Farnsworth's flawed design, the energy conversion process inside Bender's body produces an inordinate amount of waste gases and heat. He can expel these products from his rear end or, more often, as a flaming belch.

He also has a nuclear pile inside his body, as seen in "Godfellas". However, its location and purpose are not clear.

== Personality ==
Bender often exhibits sociopathic behavior; he is a pathological liar and rarely shows any empathy (his most frequent catchphrase to any bothersome person is "Bite my shiny metal ass!"). He has a mostly voluntary morality and constantly steals, ranging from the petty theft of wallets to crimes such as kidnapping Jay Leno's head and stealing Fry's blood and kidney. He also once stole Amy's earrings while giving her a hug. It was shown in "Roswell That Ends Well" that even in a disassembled state, his individual limbs carry on attempting to steal anything in proximity; the hand on his dismembered arm steals a wallet out of a scientist's pocket before becoming inactive again.

He is shown throughout the series as having a secret desire to be a folk musician that only manifests itself when a magnet is placed on or near his head. This desire is finally fulfilled in the episode "Bendin' in the Wind": an accident involving a giant can opener leaves him with a mutilated chest and paralyzed from the neck down. An encounter with Beck during his hospitalization leads to his becoming lead washboard player and the two teaming up for a musical tour that turns Bender into a folk hero for other broken robots, only for his career to end when he finally recovers.

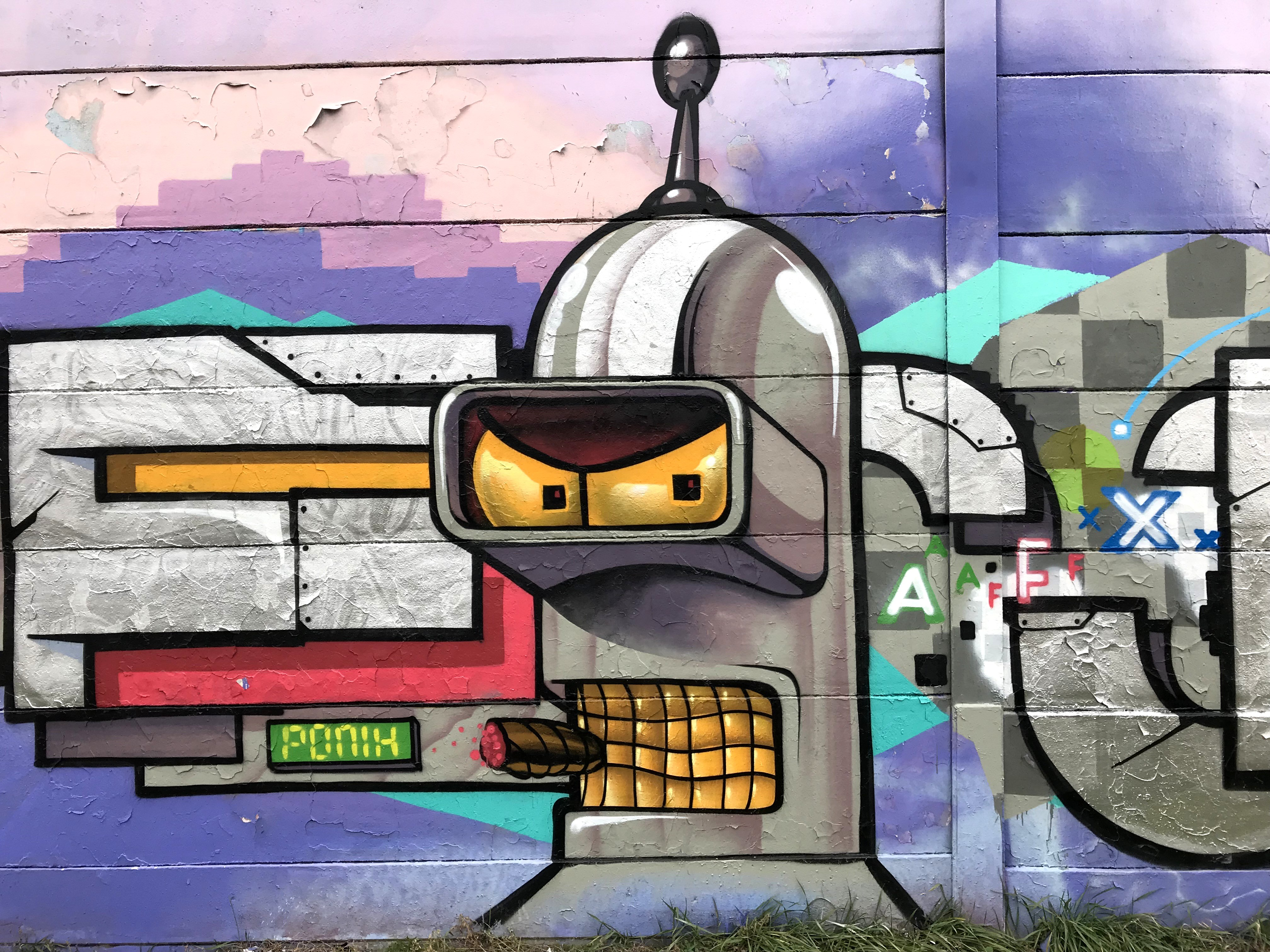
Bender's graffiti in Budapest, Pestszentlőrinc district

He is also fascinated with cooking, being the chef of the Planet Express Ship, though he is shown to have no sense of actual taste. In fact, his early dinners were so horrible that even the omnivorous Zoidberg could not eat it. In his first attempt, he creates a dinner for the crew that is so over-salted they all gag (which is aggravated further when their drinks turn out to be "salt with water in them"); he then remarks that the food was fine since the salt content was 10% below a lethal dose (unfortunately, Zoidberg had seconds). In "The Problem with Popplers", he creates dinner consisting of nothing but capers and baking soda, and mistakenly expresses his belief that humans eat rocks. He seems to improve his cooking skills over the series, cooking a lavish cake for Nibbler's birthday party and beating Elzar for the title of Iron Cook (though he uses a potion called "The Essence of Pure Flavor", which consists of water and a generous portion of LSD to make the judges hallucinate that his food tastes good). In Into the Wild Green Yonder, he mistakenly bakes prison guards a cake with nutmeg thinking it was a natural human sleep drug, before being corrected by Amy that nutmeg is in fact a baking ingredient (nutmeg in high doses will in fact cause psychoactive effects).

As a robot, he possesses an incredible amount of patience. In "Roswell That Ends Well", he is shown to wait over a thousand years in sand after his head is lost during a trip back in time to 1947, as well as many thousands of years in caverns under New New York City (although on this occasion he was also in the presence of multiple alternate versions of himself that had previously made the same 'trip'). Despite the long wait, it is implied that Bender does not power down, apparently enjoying his own company so much that he does not consider it necessary. However, in one episode, he shows next to no patience as a one-time joke.

Although the consumption of alcohol is necessitated by Bender's design and should not be generally viewed as a vice for alcohol-fueled robots, he apparently drinks far more than he needs for energy. His excessive drinking contributes to his characterization as an alcoholic ("Hell Is Other Robots" reveals that robots can function equally well on mineral oil instead of alcohol, also contributing to the perception of Bender's alcohol use as a vice). If he is deprived of alcohol, for instance during periods of depression, he ceases to function properly and shows signs similar to human drunkenness, including developing a rusty five o'clock shadow. As noted above, his disembodied head has survived for millennia with, presumably, no source of alcohol, so it may be that, when a mere head, Bender neither requires alcohol nor suffers from its absence.

When he is sufficiently frightened or sickened, bricks fall from his backside (a reference to the slang "shitting bricks"). When sufficiently fascinated by something, he may pull out a camera and snap a picture, adding the catchphrase "Neat!". He has also been shown to be able to use his eyes as cameras. In addition to drinking, he also has an affinity for cigars, which he ignites with a lighter built into his finger, although in "Decision 3012" he uses a Zippo. Unlike drinking alcohol for fuel, Bender tells Fry that he smokes cigars simply because they "make [him] look cool".

Despite being a robot, he has been seen to show emotion on many occasions, even shedding a tear in "Crimes of the Hot". One of the series' running jokes revolves around Bender having emotions, when technically he should be an unfeeling machine. Bender is seemingly unaware of his emotions, stating in the episode "Anthology of Interest II", "I mean, being a robot's great, but we don't have emotions, and sometimes that makes me very sad". In his very first appearance, he tries to kill himself via a suicide booth out of guilt for having unknowingly contributed to their creation. He has also been known to be nonchalant to the point of appearing both uncaring and incredibly brave, even in life-threatening situations.

Bender is a classic narcissist. He considers himself flawless, a "towering inferno of physical perfection", and refers to himself in both the first and third person. In "The Farnsworth Parabox" Bender seemingly falls in love with an alternate gold-plated version of himself, stating that he has finally found someone "as great as me". Even his personal email address, bender@ilovebender.com, reflects his self-absorption.

Despite these human characteristics, he has no verifiable soul, as seen in "Obsoletely Fabulous" when he passes through a "soul detector" without setting off the alarm. However, in "Ghost in the Machines", Bender becomes a ghost who can't interact with people directly but can possess machinery: he uses this ability to "scare Fry to death". He eventually makes a deal with the Robot Devil (Dan Castellaneta) to get a new body.

His relationships with the rest of the crew of Planet Express vary over time, although he treats nearly all biological organisms with disdain. The only one of his friends who he has openly shown affection for is Fry, his best friend and roommate. "Of all the friends I've had, [he is] the first." Although he is verbally and physically abusive towards Fry and considers him to be vastly inferior to him, he has been shown to care for him a great deal. In "Jurassic Bark" he states that he loves Fry "the way a human loves a dog, or the way a gorilla loves a kitty", and in "I Second That Emotion" when Bender gets jealous of Leela's pet Nibbler and flushes him down the toilet, a distraught Leela asks how he would feel if she did the same to Fry, describing Fry as Bender's pet (Bender responds with an apathetic "Only one way to find out."). He routinely takes advantage of his friends, including framing them for crimes, robbing them, stealing Fry's blood on more than one occasion, stealing Fry's power of attorney, using Fry's body to smash open a window, taking Fry's kidney and trying to sell it (it eventually gets eaten by Leela), and stealing jewelry from Amy. He is prone to using the ship's doctor, Zoidberg, in various get-rich-quick schemes, although it is probable he does not consider Dr. Zoidberg a friend, since in "Obsoletely Fabulous" Bender begged the 1X Robot to "save (his) friends, and Zoidberg" (Though it is seen that he helps Zoidberg from time to time, as seen in "That's Lobstertainment!"). He even betrays Leela to Zapp Brannigan in Into the Wild Green Yonder when she becomes a wanted criminal, out of jealousy of her steadily growing rap sheet, only to break her out of prison again to ensure his own sheet remains lengthier. Although he regularly frustrates the crew, they have demonstrated a certain affection for him in return. During "How Hermes Requisitioned His Groove Back", the entire crew travels to the Central Bureaucracy to recover Bender's brain after Morgan Proctor burned it onto a floppy disk and sent it away. Hermes Conrad (Phil LaMarr) subsequently risks his bureaucratic license to locate the disc with Bender's brain on it by sorting the entire pile in just under four minutes. In the same episode, when Amy asked why they had to fix him, after being met with a brief period of uncertain silence, Leela says, "Those arguments aside, we're still going." Amy and Bender date for a time in "Proposition Infinity"; the relationship becomes so serious that Bender proposes to Amy and participates in a campaign to legalize human/robot marriage, although the relationship ends after he realizes that such marriage rights would necessitate monogamy.

Despite his often immoral attitude, he has a softer side; he can feel guilt and remorse over his actions if he goes too far (even by his own standards), indicating that he is not as selfish or unkind as he appears to be. In "Bendless Love", Bender intends to murder Flexo in order to win the love of fem-bot Angelyne, but when Flexo gets stuck under a gigantic steel girder, Angelyne shows sorrow for him. Bender decides that her happiness is more important than his own, and ends up saving Flexo. Also, in "Jurassic Bark", when Bender becomes jealous of Fry's petrified dog, Seymour, he decides to throw him in magma. But when he realizes how his actions hurt Fry, Bender apologizes for his behavior and rescues the dog. In "Godfellas", he becomes the god of a microscopic alien race and abuses this position by commanding them to produce beer for him. When his abuse of power causes the entire species' demise, however, he cries in mourning and remorse.

== Reception and cultural influence ==
In 2008, Bender took second place behind the Terminator in a poll for the "Baddest Movie Robot" from TechRadar.

The song "Bend It Like Bender!" from the Devin Townsend Project album Addicted, is a direct reference to Bender. One of the lyrics in the song is "Game's over, losers! I have all the money!", which is a line Bender says in the episode "A Head in the Polls".

The first two Android versions were codenamed Astro Boy and Bender by Google.

=== Appearances in other media ===
Being the show's breakout character, Bender has made several cameos in different episodes of The Simpsons, another series by Matt Groening. Within The Simpsons, Bender has appeared in episodes "Future-Drama", "Bart vs. Lisa vs. the Third Grade", "Missionary: Impossible" and "Replaceable You". Bender, along with Professor Farnsworth and Fry, also makes a cameo appearance in Matt Groening's latest series Disenchantment, in the episode "Dreamland Falls" as a hologram from a crystal ball, within the one-way time machine from the Futurama episode "The Late Philip J. Fry".

In the Simpsons-Futurama crossover episode "Simpsorama", Bender travels back in time in the 21st century to Springfield to kill Homer Simpson, whose DNA is tied to the creatures rampaging in the 31st century. Bender ends up befriending Homer before learning that the creatures are in fact Bart's genetic offspring. Once the crisis is averted, Bender goes into shutdown mode in the Simpsons' basement. Bender was still resting inert in the Simpsons' basement as of 2015 episode "Cue Detective" in which his empty body cavity was used to store the family's cash nest-egg. Bender also makes a background cameo appearance in the Simpsons episode "My Fare Lady", holding a shovel and bucket at the end of Homer's dream about The Jetsons. Bender briefly appears in the episode "Simprovised" holding a sign that says "Bring Back Futurama Again".

In the episode "Real Veal / Celebrity Wife Swamp" of the TV show Mad, Bender makes a cameo appearance in the segment "Real Veal", a parody of the 2011 film Real Steel. He is seen in a robot boxing championship losing to "Real Veal", a robot-cow hybrid.

He also appears as one of the enemies, along with Doctor Zoidberg, in The Simpsons Game.

Bender's head is featured in the background of the level "Clockwork Factory" in the tower defense video game, Kingdom Rush: Vengeance.

Bender makes cameo appearances in several Family Guy episodes. In "Blue Harvest", he can be seen at the Mos Eisley cantina, and in "The Splendid Source", he is one of the repeaters of a dirty joke whose original author Peter Griffin, Joe Swanson, and Glenn Quagmire are seeking. In the episode "Boopa-dee Bappa-dee", Peter attempts to use the guide on the television remote, turning Stewie Griffin into a host of past and present Animation Domination characters, including Bender. In "Throw It Away", Lois Griffin drags Stewie's time machine down the stairs which takes them to, in order, the 1950s, the 18th century, the future, with Chris Griffin replaced by Bender, and the prehistory.
