= List of The Critic episodes =

The Critic is an American prime time animated series revolving around the life of New York film critic Jay Sherman, voiced by Jon Lovitz. It was created by writing partners Al Jean and Mike Reiss, who had previously worked as writers and showrunners (seasons 3 and 4) for The Simpsons. Twenty-three episodes of The Critic were produced, first broadcast on ABC in 1994, and finishing its original run on Fox in 1995. A revival of webisodes was released online on AtomFilms and Shockwave in 2000 and 2001.

== Series overview ==
Season	Episodes	Originally released			Rank
Season	Episodes	First released	Last released	Network	Rank
1	13	January 26, 1994	July 20, 1994	ABC	#76, 8.6 rating
2	10	March 5, 1995	May 21, 1995	Fox	#106, 7.5 rating
Webisodes	10	December 12, 2000	September 17, 2001 (ekd)	AtomFilms and Shockwave	TBA

== Episodes ==
=== Season 1 (1994) ===
The first season aired Wednesdays at 8:30-9:00 pm (EST) on ABC. (Note: The Nielsen Ratings were retrieved from the Nielsen Media Research via USA Today, but have been archived online by ratingsryan.com on their Google Drive.)

No. overall	No. in season	Title	Directed by	Written by	Original release date	Prod. code	U.S. viewers (millions)
1	1	"Pilot"	Rich Moore	Al Jean & Mike Reiss	January 26, 1994	7811-101	26.5
A short, balding, overweight, divorced film critic named Jay Sherman gets a second chance at love when a gorgeous movie star named Valerie Fox (voiced by Jennifer Lien) falls for him, but it may all go to pieces if Jay doesn't give Valerie a glowing review for her latest movie, the Basic Instinct-inspired erotic thriller, Kiss of Death.
2	2	"Marty's First Date"	Alan Smart	Tom Gammill & Max Pross	February 2, 1994	7811-103	18.2
Marty invites his father Jay to Career Day at his school, where Marty falls for a Cuban girl named Carmen, who is later revealed to be the granddaughter of Fidel Castro.
3	3	"Dial 'M' for Mother"	Bret Haaland	Al Jean & Mike Reiss	February 9, 1994	7811-104	16.7
When test audiences brand Jay Sherman "worse than Hitler," Duke sets up a TV special where Geraldo Rivera interviews Jay with his adoptive mother Eleanor, which falls apart when Jay yells at Eleanor.
4	4	"Miserable"	Dan Jeup	Steven Levitan	February 16, 1994	7811-102	13.3
Jay falls for a female projectionist (voiced by Pamela Reed) who turns out to be an obsessed fan of his.
5	5	"A Little Deb Will Do Ya"	Lauren MacMullan	Nell Scovell	February 23, 1994	7811-105	10.8
Eleanor forces Margo to get prepared for and attend a debutante ball, despite Margo's protests over how sexist and elitist it is. Meanwhile, Jay gets into a ratings war with children's show host Humphrey the Hippo.
6	6	"Eyes on the Prize"	Dan Jeup & Brian Sheesley	Tom Brady	March 2, 1994	7811-106	17.1
Jay rethinks his career when his 1000th episode bash is a dud. He seeks advice from image consultant Adolph Hitmaker (voiced by Phil Hartman), but his advice and all other attempts at recreating his TV image prove unsuccessful.
7	7	"Every Doris Has Her Day"	Alan Smart	Steve Tompkins	June 1, 1994	7811-107	14.0
Jay befriends his make-up lady Doris after they attend a musical adaptation of The Hunchback of Notre-Dame, and thinks that she may be the mother who gave him up for adoption years ago.
8	8	"Marathon Mensch"	Susie Dietter	Judd Apatow	June 8, 1994	7811-108	10.8
Jay's masculinity is called into question after Doris rescues Jay from a studio fire, so Jay trains for the New York marathon.
9	9	"L.A. Jay"	Bret Haaland	Steven Levitan	June 22, 1994	7811-109	11.4
Jay moves to Los Angeles when studio executive Gary Grossman (voiced by Billy Crystal) offers the critic a chance to write the second sequel to the Ghostchasers franchise.
10	10	"Dr. Jay"	Dan Jeup	Jon Vitti	June 29, 1994	7811-110	10.6
Duke is diagnosed with a rare disease, and Jay is determined to find a cure.
11	11	"A Day at the Races and a Night at the Opera"	Lauren MacMullan	Ken Keeler	July 6, 1994	7811-111	10.8
After Marty bombs out during his elementary school field day, Jay buys his son a guitar and encourages him to take lessons. Meanwhile, after Them Magazine christens Jay "The Wittiest Man in the World," Duke offers to pay $100 to every viewer who does not find Jay funny.
12	12	"Uneasy Rider"	Alan Smart	Steve Tompkins	July 13, 1994	7811-112	10.7
After refusing to plug chewing tobacco on his show, Jay quits his job and becomes a truck driver.
13	13	"A Pig Boy and His Dog"	Bret Haaland	Patric Verrone	July 20, 1994	7811-113	9.9
In the first season finale, Eleanor writes a children's book called "The Fat Little Pig," featuring a character based on Jay. Meanwhile, Jay adopts a Great Dane puppy, who grows up too fast and becomes a nuisance.

=== The Simpsons Crossover (1995) ===
No. overall	No. in season	Title	Directed by	Written by	Original release date	Prod. code	Viewers (millions)
121	18	"A Star Is Burns"	Susie Dietter	Ken Keeler	March 5, 1995	2F31	14.4
Following a news report naming Springfield as "America's Worst City" due to its lack of culture and backwards view on science, the town adopts Marge's suggestion of a film festival, in which any of the townspeople can enter a short film. To help her judge, Jay Sherman (who is trying to escape Rainier Wolfcastle after insulting him about his new stand-up comedy movie, McBain: Let's Get Silly) comes from New York City to stay at the Simpsons' house. Homer feels threatened by Jay, and so Marge puts him on the panel as well. At the festival, the vote becomes deadlocked between Mr. Burns' self-glorifying biopic, Hans Moleman's comedy short, "Man Getting Hit By Football" (which is little more than Hans getting hit in the groin by someone throwing a football offscreen), and "Puke-ahuntas", Barney's touching film about how his alcoholism has ruined his life.

=== Season 2 (1995) ===
The second season aired Sundays at 8:30-9:00 pm (EST) on Fox. It began following the Simpsons episode "A Star Is Burns", which featured Jay Sherman in what Bart would offhandedly refer to as a "cheap cartoon crossover" while watching The Jetsons Meet the Flintstones. (Note: The Nielsen Ratings were retrieved from the Nielsen Media Research via USA Today, but have been archived online by ratingsryan.com on their Google Drive.)

No. overall	No. in season	Title	Directed by	Written by	Original release date	Prod. code	U.S. viewers (millions)
14	1	"Sherman, Woman and Child"	Bret Haaland	Al Jean & Mike Reiss	March 5, 1995	201	13.8
In the second season premiere, Jay worries that he may be fired due to Coming Attractions' low ratings and Duke suddenly being nice to him. He then befriends a single mother from The South named Alice, and develops feelings for her. However, Alice's adulterous, country-singing husband Cyrus (voiced by Sam McMurray) has returned and wants her back.
15	2	"Siskel & Ebert & Jay & Alice"	Lauren MacMullan	Jon Vitti	March 12, 1995	207	14.3
After Jay attends the Academy Awards, Gene Siskel and Roger Ebert break up and each rope Jay to be their new partner.
16	3	"Lady Hawke"	Rich Moore	Tom Brady	March 19, 1995	205	12.1
During a taping of the sketch comedy show Yesterday Night Live, Jay meets Jeremy's twin sister Olivia (voiced by Morwenna Banks). After Jay takes Olivia on a tour of the city, she falls in love with him and the two start dating. This strains Jay's relationship with Alice, who realizes that she is also in love with Jay.
17	4	"A Song for Margo"	Tom Mazzacco	Joshua Sternin & Jennifer Ventimilia	March 26, 1995	203	10.8
Margo dates Nuns in a Blender frontman Johnny Wrath (voiced by Todd Louiso), while Alice tries to find a good preschool for her daughter, Penny.
18	5	"From Chunk to Hunk"	Steven Dean Moore	Steve Tompkins	April 2, 1995	204	9.3
Jay and Marty go to a weight-loss camp, where Marty dramatically loses weight and becomes one of the popular kids in school. At the same time, Jay fears for his life when pretty-boy action star, Jean-Paul LePope, threatens to kill him after trashing his latest movie.
19	6	"All the Duke's Men"	Chuck Sheetz	Patric Verrone	April 23, 1995	208	11.3
After Jay helps Marty get elected class president, Duke decides to run for U.S. President himself (despite his lack of political experience) and hires Jay as his speechwriter.
20	7	"Sherman of Arabia"	Brian Sheesley	Richard Doctorow	April 30, 1995	202	11.9
At Marty's slumber party, Jay tells the story of how he ended up in Iraq during the Gulf War in the early 1990s.
21	8	"Frankie and Ellie Get Lost"	David Cutler	Story by : Judd Apatow; Teleplay by : Richard Doctorow	May 7, 1995	206	8.5
Franklin and Eleanor are presumed dead after their plane crashes on the island, and Jay uses the money left to him in the will to make New York City a better place.
22	9	"Dukerella"	Bret Haaland	Ken Keeler	May 14, 1995	209	11.1
Alice's sister Miranda moves to New York to find a rich man to marry. She then ends up taking a job at a mattress delivery service called "Mattress in an Hour." She falls in love with Duke when she sees him on Coming Attractions and attends his costume ball with Jay and Alice in order to meet him.
23	10	"I Can't Believe It's a Clip Show"	Lauren MacMullan	Tom Brady, Richard Doctorow, Al Jean, Mike Reiss, Ken Keeler, Joshua Sternin, Jennifer Ventimilia, Steve Tompkins, Patric Verrone & Jon Vitti	May 21, 1995	210	12.6
Jay hosts a 10th anniversary special of Coming Attractions, featuring past clips of the many crummy movies he had to review, but the festivities come to a halt when a group of terrorists holds everyone hostage.

=== Webisodes (2000–01) ===
In early 2000, show creators Al Jean and Mike Reiss wrote a series of ten 3-4 minute long internet webisodes of The Critic, still with Jon Lovitz as the starring role. While still making fun of movies and Hollywood in general, its story focused on Jay lusting after Jennifer, his new makeup lady (voiced by Valerie Levitt). Alice does not appear in any of the episodes and is not mentioned by name, though Jay does briefly refer to a "second divorce" in the first episode—presumably from her or the Mexican woman he married in order to get to Cuba. Besides Jay, Vlada (voiced by Nick Jameson) is the only other character from the show to make an appearance. Maurice LaMarche and Tress MacNeille are the only other cast members from the show to return alongside Lovitz and Jameson, voicing assorted background characters. MacNeille returned for webisode 10. The episodes were available on AtomFilms.com and Shockwave.com until 2001. All ten of the "webisodes" were included on the complete series DVD (but not iTunes). Parodies include gaffs on The Patriot, Harry Potter, Mission: Impossible 2, X-Men, Pearl Harbor and Cast Away.

Episodes 1 through 4 were animated by Jet City Studios; 5, 9, and 10 by Unbound Studios; and 6 through 8 by Flinch Studios.

No. overall	No. in season	Movies parodied	Written by	Original release date	Runtime
24	1	"X-Men"	Al Jean & Mike Reiss	December 12, 2000	3:20
Jay talks about his rise and fall from fame and introduces his new make-up lady, Jennifer.
25	2	"Mission: Impossible 2, Gladiator, Gone in 60 Seconds"	Al Jean & Mike Reiss	December 12, 2000	3:22
Jay reviews the best movies from the year 2000 in a beach-themed studio (since all public beaches have banned Jay until he loses 20 pounds) and gets an unexpected visit from Arnold Schwarzenegger.
26	3	"Pokemon 2000, The Patriot"	Al Jean & Mike Reiss	January 2001	3:50
Jay pans The Patriot with special guest Pikachu (from the Pokémon video games, TV shows, and movies), whom he outs. All the while, Jay tries to prove to Jennifer he is nice enough to date.
27	4	"Perfect Storm, Star Wars, Titanic, The Sixth Sense"	Al Jean & Mike Reiss	January 2001	2:34
Jay finally lands a date with Jennifer. He takes her to L'ANE Riche (The Wealthy Jackass) where he talks about the movies he missed out on reviewing while unemployed.
28	5	"Out of Africa, Silence Of The Lambs, On the Waterfront"	Al Jean & Mike Reiss	March 2001	3:39
Jay reviews the Oscars.
29	6	"Sleepy Hollow, Pulp Fiction"	Al Jean & Mike Reiss	April 2001	2:59
Jay discusses Sleepy Hollow and a spoof of Pulp Fiction with Jennifer at her apartment.
30	7	"Cast Away, The Legend of Bagger Vance"	Al Jean & Mike Reiss	May 2001	3:18
Jay takes a look at the best films of the year 2000, including Cast Away and The Legend of Bagger Vance. Note: When this episode premiered online, viewers could choose one of two different endings, depending on whether they wanted to see Jay act like a "Gentleman" or an "Animal" at Jennifer's apartment. He fails to have sex with her in both, and he urges viewers to complain to their Internet service provider. Both endings are available on the DVD.
31	8	"Harry Potter, Planet of the Apes"	Al Jean & Mike Reiss	May 2001	3:58
Jay visits the set of the Harry Potter film and takes a look at the Planet of the Apes remake. He also shows Jennifer his favorite spots in New York City. Later at her apartment, Jennifer introduces Jay to her many children and he asks the viewers' opinion of what he should do, showing gratefulness when they suggest that he have sex with her.
32	9	"Broadway"	Al Jean & Mike Reiss	June 2001	3:28
Since he hasn't seen a good movie to review in months, Jay defuses Broadway bombs, such as "Copenhagen," "Tuesdays with Morrie: The Musical," "The Graduate" with Kathleen Turner as Mrs. Robinson (the role later played by Jon Lovitz), and "Death of a Seinfeld."
33	10	"Pearl Harbor"	Al Jean	September 17, 2001 (ekd)	3:42
Jay reviews Pearl Harbor and is mistaken for Shrek while waiting in line at the movies with Jennifer.
