= I Can't Believe It's a Clip Show =

- The Critic episode
- Episode no.: Season 2 Episode 10
- Directed by: D.R.L. MacMoortler
- Written by: Tom Brady; Richard Doctorow; Al Jean; Ken Keeler; Mike Reiss; Joshua Sternin; Steve Tompkins; Jennifer Ventimilia; Patric Verrone; Jon Vitti
- Original air date: May 21, 1995
- Running time: 22 minutes

Guest appearances
- Milton Berle (Himself); Kareem Abdul-Jabbar (Himself)

Episode chronology
| ← Previous "Dukerella" | Next → — |

"I Can't Believe It's a Clip Show" is the 10th episode and series finale of the second season of the US animated sitcom The Critic.

== Background ==
The A.V. Club explains, "The animated sitcom The Critic survived its first cancellation by ABC when Fox picked it up for a second season, but the show wasn’t so lucky the second time around. Though there were rumors of a third pick-up—by UPN this time—the original adventures of film critic Jay Sherman did come to an end on Fox".

On April 21, 1995, The New York Daily News reported on an incident revolving around the episode's airing: "In response to Wednesday's terrorist bombing in Oklahoma City, Fox has pulled the episode of The Critic that had been scheduled to air this Sunday night. Fox and the show's production company, Columbia Tri-Star Television, decided that it would be insensitive to try to get laughs from such an image right now, notwithstanding its comedic context. Instead, an episode titled "All the Duke's Men," which is heavy on political satire, will run at 8:30 Sunday night".

== Plot ==
ShareTV describes its plot thus: "Jay hosts his tenth anniversary show live from Carnegie Hall, where he shows movie clips from past episodes like Rabbi P.I., and many others. Jay's anniversary show at the Carnegie Hall gets held hostage by terrorists, who threaten to blow up the place with a bomb tied to Jay's waist."

== Characters ==
- Jon Lovitz - Jay Sherman
- Nancy Cartwright - Margo Sherman
- Christine Cavanaugh - Marty Sherman
- Gerrit Graham - Franklin Sherman
- Doris Grau - Doris Grossman
- Judith Ivey - Eleanor Sherman
- Nick Jameson - Vlada Veramirovich
- Maurice LaMarche - Jeremy Hawke/Spartacus
- Charles Napier - Duke Phillips
- Park Overall - Alice Tompkins

== Critical reception ==
AnimatedViwes said, "Unfortunately, this turned out to be the final show, but remains a fitting tribute, and closes on one of the best public digs between a series producer and a network that I've ever come across – classic!"

TheDigitalFix said this "final episode (sadly the worst of them all) [is] utterly pointless and sadly a bad end to the series".

Slant magazine said,

Fox cancelled The Critic, forcing it to end on the intentionally shoddy 23rd installment "I Can't Believe It's a Clip Show." Here The Critic achieves a postmodern sophistication alien to most series television. While hosting his 10th Anniversary special (we fans can only wish) at Carnegie Hall, Jay and his family are taken hostage by a deranged group of terrorists. Jean and Reiss call attention to the show's very mechanisms, leaving in obvious mistakes like mismatched lip movements and repetitive animations. As the terrorists' bomb counts down, clips from the entire series play as both counterpoint and summation, all leading up to an explosive finale instigated by the legendary Milton Berle, clad in ninja garb. A climactic, sincere spoof of West Side Story leaves us with a full-on view of all the characters we've grown to love over two networks and too short a time. And upon the final fade-out it is near impossible to hold back a protest at the unfairness of it all. So we answer back to the darkness with our own bitter and ironic reading of Jay Sherman's signature catchphrase: "It stinks!".

The A.V. Club said:

There's barely any plot to "I Can't Believe It's A Clip Show." The episode is more a clearinghouse for every movie parody idea that The Critic's writers had been unable to squeeze into the previous 22 episodes. As such, it's a fitting send-off for the series, leaving nothing on the shelf.
