= World Trade Center in popular culture =

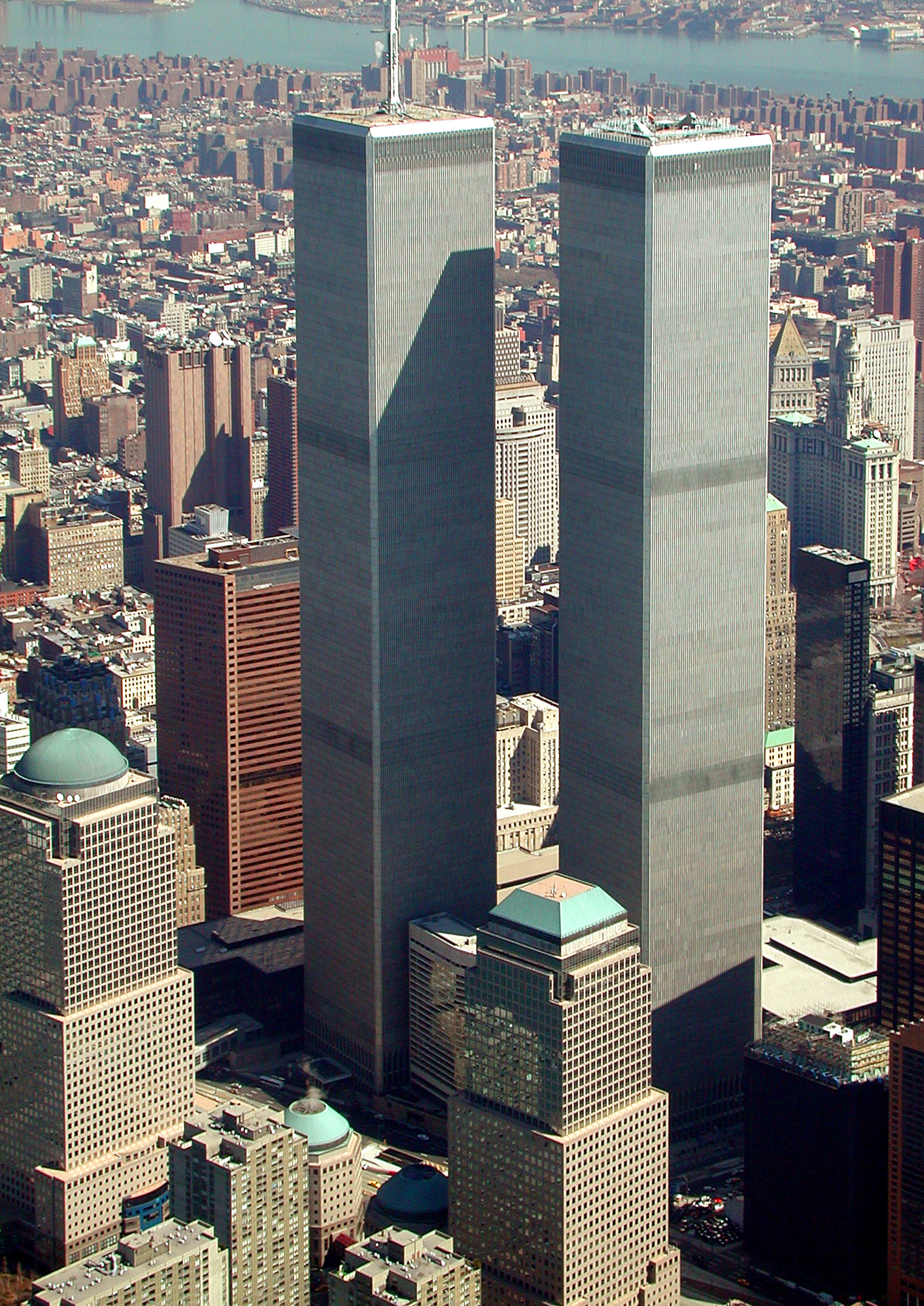
The original World Trade Center in March 2001. The tower on the left, with the antenna spire, was 1 WTC. The tower on the right was 2 WTC.

The original World Trade Center, which featured the landmark Twin Towers (1 WTC and 2 WTC), was a building complex in the Financial District in Lower Manhattan, New York City. 1 and 2 World Trade Center – the North and South Tower – stood at 417 and 415 meters (1,368 and 1,362 feet) with 110-stories respectively, becoming the tallest buildings in the world from 1971 to 1973. The North Tower, with its antenna included, was the tallest building in the world by pinnacle height until the towers were destroyed in the September 11 attacks in 2001. An iconic feature of the New York City skyline for nearly three decades, the World Trade Center has been featured in comic books, computer games, video games, television, films, photographs, artwork, and music videos.

== Literature ==
=== Books ===
In Richard Martin Stern's novel The Tower (1973), a breeches buoy line shot from a helicopter is used to link the World Trade Center's North Tower to the neighboring (fictional and taller) World Tower Building to rescue hundreds of people trapped by a fire. Dozens of people are saved by this method before the breeches buoy is overwhelmed in a panic and crashes to the ground below. The World Trade Center's Twin Towers appear on the cover of Wilt Chamberlain's 1991 reissue of his book A View From Above. Similarly, The World Trade Center can be seen on the cover of Anne Gutman and Georg Hallensleben's children's book Lisa in New York (The Misadventures of Gaspard and Lisa), which was published in 2002, a year after the building complex was destroyed. and in Godzilla: Monster Apocalypse, the prequel novel of Godzilla: Planet of the Monsters anime film, the giant mantis Kamacuras appeared in New York City in May 1999, and proceeded to destroy the World Trade Center and devastate much of the city, leaving 2.5 million casualties.

=== Comic books and graphic novels ===
Most of the Marvel Comics' heroes reside in New York City, so views of the towers were not uncommon. The World Trade Center complex was featured in numerous other comics as well.

- In Uncanny X-Men #189 (1985), Rachel Summers describes the dire future of the early 21st century from which she originates. In this future, the Twin Towers are devastated after an attack from an unspecified perpetrator.
- The 1986 graphic novel Rebel, by Pepe Moreno, depicted the two towers being destroyed in a post-apocalyptic 2002 setting.
- In Damage Control #1 (1989), the Twin Towers are damaged when a giant robot falls on them. Damage Control, a construction company that specializes in repairing superhero-related damage, has the towers repaired (although visibly crooked) by the end of the issue.
- In the 1992 Mort & Phil comic El 35 aniversario (The 35th Anniversary) appears an image of a plane that crashes into the WTC.
- Adventures of Superman #596 was coincidentally released one day after the September 11, 2001 attacks. It depicted, in passing, the World Trade Center (specifically the Twin Towers) as having been damaged but not destroyed by an alien attack. The issue's artist, Mike Wieringo, remarked, "The book was completed months ago. The ironic thing is that the damage done by the terrorists is far greater than I could ever portray visually." The book's writer, Joe Casey, could not have intentionally referenced the attacks on the World Trade Center, but DC acknowledged that it mirrored the devastation so vividly that they made the books returnable without penalty to retailers. Many retailers took DC up on this offer, causing the issue to become sought after on the secondary market due to its rarity and general curiosity towards the real-life synchronicity with the 9-11 attacks.
- Captain America vol. 4 #1 had Steve Rogers arguing with Nick Fury when the former decided to stay and find survivors before heading to Afghanistan.
- Marvel Comics' Marvel Graphic Novel #17 depicts the Living Monolith standing almost as tall as the World Trade Center and thrusting his fist through one of the towers.
- The 2004 comic Ex Machina detailed the life of Mitchell Hundred, formerly the world's first and only superhero, who was elected mayor of New York City in the wake of his saving hundreds of lives during the North Tower's collapse and preventing the South Tower's collapse.
- The Amazing Spider-Man vol. 2 #36 showed the aftermath of the Towers’ collapse through the heroes’ eyes, more specifically Spider-Man's.

The Twin Towers of the World Trade Center have also been depicted in several online web comics:

- Coming-of-age web comic "Maddie in America" vols. 2 and 3 are set at the original World Trade Center during November 1985, with the main characters staying at the Vista Hotel and visiting the Austin J. Tobin Plaza and the Windows on the World restaurant.
- After Volume 5 of the spin-off series "Outsiders", the Twin Towers become a focal location of the series as the workplace of main character Siobhan Pattinson. She receives employment on the 103rd floor of the South Tower in the summer of 1987.
- Artist Sebastian Utzni's "M-Maybe" collects pages from 18 Comics published between 1973 and 2001 depicting the destruction of the Twin Towers.

== Television ==
=== Animation ===
- In the M.A.S.K. episode "Attack on Liberty" (1985), Matt Trakker confronts Miles Mayhem in the North Tower.
- The Twin Towers appear in The Transformers episode "City of Steel" (1985).
- In The Real Ghostbusters episode "The Boogeyman is Back" (1986), the Twin Towers are the site of a battle between the Ghostbusters and a blue ghost.
- The Twin Towers are depicted as being part of the skyline of New York City in multiple episodes of Teenage Mutant Ninja Turtles (1987).
  - In the second-season episode "Enter: The Fly", the TMNT confront Shredder at the Twin Towers.
  - In the third-season episode "The Big Blow Out", Krang uses the World Trade Center as a conduit to propel Earth into Dimension X.
- In the Fantastic Four episode "Incursion of the Skrull" (1994), the Twin Towers are destroyed by Skrull forces in an in-universe video game played by the Thing.
- In the Iron Man episode "The Grim Reaper Wears a Teflon Coat" (1994), the Twin Towers are destroyed in a simulation run by Tony Stark to demonstrate what would happen if the Grim Reaper fighter jet fell in the wrong hands.
- In Gargoyles (1994), the Twin Towers are seen in a few episodes (such as the five-part pilot) as well as the third-season premiere.
- In Futurama (1999), there is a future WTC in New York with its appearance very similar to the old one, except for its skybridges. In the art for the Volume 1 DVD collection, they are shown as similar to the Petronas Towers.
- In the Fantomcat episode "The Manhattan Incident" (1995), Dr. Butyrik attempts to launch a bomb from the top of the North Tower to destroy Manhattan.
- In Downtown (1998), the towers are seen in the background of a couple of episodes.
- In the Godzilla: The Series episode "Future Shock" (1999), the Twin Towers are shown to have been destroyed in the potential future of 2022.
- In the Spy Groove episode "Manhattan Glam Chowder" (2001), Agent #1 confronts the villain Mr. Fish on the top of the South Tower.
- The Twin Towers appear in a dream sequence in the Hey Arnold! episode "Married" (2002).
- In the animated sitcom The Simpsons:
  - In the episode "A Star Is Burns" (1995), the towers appear in a transition shot after Marge starts writing an invitation letter to critic Jay Sherman.
  - In the season 9 episode "The City of New York vs. Homer Simpson" (1997), Homer is forced to deal with a mountain of parking tickets issued while his car sat illegally for months in the Austin J. Tobin Plaza of the World Trade Center. Following the events of 9/11, the episode was banned in many countries. However, it was included in the season 9 box set and continued to air in syndication on some Fox networks.
  - In "Desperately Xeeking Xena" (1999), the towers appear during the scene where Lisa uses her super strength to destroy a Nazi blimp with the Statue of Liberty.
  - In the episode "New Kids on the Blecch" (2001), the towers are seen as L.T. Smash steers a battleship into New York Harbor intending to blow up MAD Magazine.
- In the Digimon Adventure 02 episode "Digimon World Tour" (2001), the Twin Towers are seen in a skyline shot when Davis and Kari arrive in New York to round up a group of rogue Digimon.
- In the first episode of Read or Die (2001), an aerial battle in Lower Manhattan begins with a helicopter crashing on the roof of one of the towers.
- The Twin Towers were depicted in the pilot episode of the animated TV show The Critic.
- In The Penguins of Madagascar episode "Operation: Big Blue Marble" (2012), the skyline of New York is seen, showing the new One World Trade Center and Battery Park.
- The Twin Towers are depicted several times in the animated sitcom Family Guy:
  - In the episode titled "A Picture is Worth 1,000 Bucks" (2000), Peter does a musical number with Meg across NYC, with the Twin Towers being visible.
  - In "Brian Wallows and Peter's Swallows" (2002), Brian performs a musical number to Pearl about how America has changed since the 1950s, with the Twin Towers being visible. Following the events of 9/11, some airings of the episode had the Twin Towers digitally removed.
  - In the episode "Baby Not on Board" (2008), Peter and the family visit Ground Zero.
  - In the episode "Hannah Banana" (2009), the September 11 attacks are seen as an Islamic man crashing a bicycle into one of the Twin Towers.
  - In the episode "Back to the Pilot" (2011), Brian Griffin prevents the events of 9/11 after being warned by his time-traveling future self.
  - In the episode "Peter & Lois' Wedding" (2019), the Twin Towers are seen several times on a flashback.

=== Live action television ===
- In the TV series Miami Vice (1984–1989), the Twin Towers are seen in the background of the pilot episode "Brother's Keeper" in Ricardo Tubbs' flashback. In the first episode of Season 2 "The Prodigal Son", the Twin Towers can be seen during the New York montage, and the shootout at the end of the episode was shot at the World Trade Center around The Sphere, Crockett then chases a drug dealer down and shoots down a helicopter with the Twin Towers seen in the background.
- In the TV sitcom Barney Miller (1975–1982), the Twin Towers were depicted in its intro before the opening credits from season 2 until the end of the series.
- The exterior and interior of the Twin Towers were featured prominently, along with other New York City landmarks, in Late Night with David Letterman’s opening montage from 1987 to 1992.
- The TV series Third Watch (1999–2005), set in New York City, featured many shots of the Towers during the show's first two seasons. One final shot appeared in the episode September 10, set the day before the attacks.
- The first two seasons of Law & Order: Special Victims Unit included a shot of the towers at the beginning and end of the opening sequence. It was removed for episodes that aired after the attacks.
- The pilot of the TV series The Lone Gunmen, first aired on March 4, 2001, had the gunmen thwarting a plot to fly a jet into the World Trade Center. In the episode, a faction of the U.S. government is behind the plot; they hope to blame the attack on another country's dictator and use it as an excuse to start a war with him.
- In the first and second intro of Power Rangers Time Force (2001), the Time Shadow was seen standing on the Twin Towers, just before the title of the show appears. After the events of 9/11, Fox Kids chose to remove the towers from the intro.
- The third season of NBC's The West Wing was postponed; instead, a special episode called "Isaac and Ishmael" was run. The episode started with the main characters paying tribute to the victims of 9/11 and dealt mainly with terrorism.
- In Star Trek: Enterprise (2001–2005), an image of the Twin Towers burning was visible in a panorama of historical images present in the timestream, when Daniels informed Jonathan Archer that time had been altered and set back on course. The episode is a two-parter called "Storm Front."
- The 2005–06 Portuguese soap opera Tempo de Viver devoted its entire first episode to a diamond heist in a South Tower corporate office. A subsequent confrontation as the would-be thief is caught is violently interrupted by Flight 11 crashing into the North Tower. The characters involved then scramble to leave the South Tower after it is also struck. Fictional footage of the attack as seen from the interior of the office was digitally created, but stock footage was also used for other scenes and later flashbacks.
- The 2003 HBO miniseries Angels in America (which takes place in the late 1980s) is noteworthy as being the first major post-9/11 production to digitally insert the towers in the New York City skyline.
- In a 2005 episode of Lost the Twin Towers are seen out of the window of a New York solicitor's office. They were digitally inserted to show the episode's time frame.
- From 2007 to 2009, 7 World Trade Center's facade is used as the preface to scenes in ABC's Dirty Sexy Money for the office of Patrick "Tripp" Darling III.
- Shots of New York's skyline and well known locations, including some featuring the World Trade Center, were regularly used between scenes during Friends' run (1994–2004). Those featuring the towers were retired after the attacks.
- The King of Queens also had the towers in the skyline behind the Brooklyn Bridge in the opening credits of the show.
- On Fringe:
  - During the final scene of the season one finale of Fringe, the World Trade Center is seen intact in a parallel universe of New York City. The main character, Olivia Dunham, is revealed to be in a South Tower office in an alternate reality of 2009 in which the World Trade Center was not destroyed on September 11, 2001. A newspaper headline reading "OBAMAS SET TO MOVE INTO NEW WHITE HOUSE" suggests that the White House was destroyed on September 11 in this alternate timeline instead of the Towers, and had just recently been rebuilt.
    - The pan shot uses both real footage and CGI. As the shot pans out, it is visually clear that the Twin Towers are CGI, as the darker "bands" (the Skylobbies) are not visible. After sun flashes onto the screen, the Towers are less dark and have darker "bands."
  - Following that episode, the show uses the Twin Towers as a frequent point of reference to indicate when a certain scene takes place in the parallel universe.
  - 2011 – Peter Bishop appears 15 years into the future in Season 3, standing outside of One World Trade Center.
  - From 2008–present, Fringe depicts the rebuilt 7 World Trade Center as the headquarters of commercial conglomerate Massive Dynamic, and the Twin Towers as still standing as of 2011 (Season 4) in a parallel universe. Massive Dynamic was also headquartered in the World Trade Center's South Tower in the episode "Brown Betty".
- In a first-season episode of Journeyman, the Twin Towers are seen in a picture on the front page of a San Francisco newspaper when the main character goes back in time before the terrorist attacks.
- McCloud: in several episodes throughout the series, the World Trade Center can be seen in various stages of construction. The opening credits of Seasons 1 and 2 show both towers still under construction. During a scene on a ferry in the season three episode titled "A Little Plot At Tranquil Valley", a completed North Tower and a partially constructed South Tower can be seen in the background. The Towers also appeared in the opening credits of later seasons when McCloud was carried by a helicopter across Manhattan.
- The TV series Medium's seventh season episode "Where Were You When...?" features a quick shot of the burning towers.
- In the first season of Rescue Me (2004–2011), the main character of Tommy Gavin has several flashbacks to 9/11, both before and after the towers fall. 9/11 is mentioned through the entire season featuring four firefighters who died on that day. One of them appears in almost every episode as a vision to Tommy. Rescue Me was the first TV show to show a dramatized depiction of the events of 9/11.
- As construction of the World Trade Center progressed, it began appearing in later seasons of the Marlo Thomas series That Girl.
- In the pilot episode of the US version of Life on Mars, a shot of the Twin Towers with the upper floors still under construction is used to show that the main character has presumedly gone back in time to the year 1973.
- In the 2020 drama Quiz, the ITV crew were talking about whether to air the show or not. Meanwhile, they change to a news channel which is showing 9/11 in live pictures.
- In Season 7, Episode 5, "A Trout in the Milk", of Agents of S.H.I.E.L.D. the Twin Towers are used as an establishing shot of 1973 New York, after the opening credits and title card. In reality, the telecommunications antenna shown on the North Tower was not added until 1978.
- Continuing into 2020, The Rachael Ray television show showed the World Trade Center in the backdrop to the studio kitchen.
- In the Netflix series The Crown, during the chapter in where Princess Diana visits New York in season 4, the Twin Towers appeared briefly in a cutscene.
- In the Netflix miniseries Archive 81, Dan Turner looks out a hospital window in 1994 and the Twin Towers are seen in the windows reflection.
- In the 1996 Mark I Video program C&O 614 Return of a Thoroughbred, the Twin Towers appear briefly in the background of a few shots with C&O 614 in the foreground prior to departing Hoboken Terminal for Port Jervis, New York.
- In the Apple TV series For All Mankind, various shots of the Twin Towers are seen on news broadcasts in the show's alternate timeline from the early 1970s up to the mid-1990s.
- In the Peacock limited series The Continental, the Twin Towers are seen in various shots of the skyline of 1970s New York. Whether due to error or otherwise, the Twin Towers can be seen alongside the completed Brookfield Place, and the One Vanderbilt skyscraper, despite the former being completed only in 1985, and the latter in 2020.
- In the miniseries Mike about Mike Bongiorno realized by Italian RAI in 2024, the Twin Towers (under construction) appear in a scene settled in New York in 1971.
- The opening sequence for the TV series The 10th Kingdom begins with a view on Lower Manhattan, where the towers are clearly visible. As the intro progresses and the city transforms into a magical world, the towers can be very briefly seen sinking into the ground.
- In the 6th episode of the Netflix series Monsters: The Lyle and Erik Menendez Story, a shot of the Twin Towers is used to symbolize a character's arrival in New York.
- In the episode "Inconstant Moon" of the Canadian TV series The Outer Limits, the New York skyline with the towers is shown getting annihilated after the Sun enters the nova stage.

=== Televised advertisements ===
- An Anheuser-Busch advertisement for Budweiser beer features the company's signature Clydesdale horses appearing to pay their respects to the tower-less New York skyline. It was aired during Fox Sports's TV broadcast of Super Bowl XXXVI in 2002. It was also aired again twice, once on the tenth anniversary of the attacks, during that day's National Football League (NFL) games and for the second time on the twentieth anniversary, this time showing additional structures on the site now completed and the Tribute in Light illuminating the sunset sky.
- The Twin Towers had appeared on the cityscape graphic that appeared on cans of Chock full o'Nuts coffee. The graphic was later revamped with the towers removed after 9/11.
- In Eurosport's Olympic Magazine commercial, a few seconds of the beginning of the North Tower collapse are shown.
- An early Windows 95 commercial features several shots of the towers.

== Music ==
- The 1995 music video for Janet Jackson's song Runaway features the singer leaping atop landmarks around the world and features the singer twirling in the air next to the World Trade Center.
- The music video for Lil' Kim's 1996 No Time single was shot within the World Trade Center premises.
- The Italian singer Eros Ramazotti made a video for his song "Cose Della Vita" (1993). Throughout the video, the towers and part of Lower Manhattan are visible.
- The cover of the US version of the album Stars on Long Play III features a woman wearing 3-D glasses in front of the towers with three stars.
- The cover of the album Breakfast in America by Supertramp features the New York City skyline and the Twin Towers, portrayed as common kitchen items, from the view of an airplane window.
- The towers were featured in Limp Bizkit's music video "Rollin'" from 2000 starring the band members performing on top of the South Tower. Their video was awarded as the best music video at the 2001 MTV Video Music Awards on 6 September 2001. On 10 September 2001, the day before the attacks, Limp Bizkit received a letter and a fruit basket from the Port Authority of New York City thanking for showing the towers in the video and winning the award with it.
- A French promotional video for Depeche Mode's song "Enjoy the Silence" was filmed at the World Trade Center. The video features the members on top of the South Tower lip-syncing to the song, with views of the North Tower in the background.
- The towers are featured in the opening shot of Rod Stewart's music video for the song "Sailing".
- The towers are featured in the opening shot of Spice Girls music video for the song "2 Become 1" in 1996, as a daytime to nighttime lapse.
- The towers are featured in the opening shot of Blondie's music video for the song "Heart of Glass".
- The towers are featured in the opening shot of Bananarama's music video for the song "Cruel Summer".
- The towers are featured in the opening shot of Tina Turner's music video for the song "What's Love Got to Do with It".
- The towers are featured in the opening shot of Madonna's music video for the song "Like a Virgin" and throughout the video for the song "Papa Don't Preach".
- The towers are featured in the opening shot of Jennifer Rush's music video for the song "The Power of Love"
- The towers can be seen in the opening shot of the music video for the song "Love Is the Hero" by Billy Squier featuring Freddie Mercury (1986).
- The towers can be seen in the music video for the song "Minus zero" by Polish rock band Lady Pank (1985).
- The towers can be seen in the music video for the song "Big Big World" by Swedish singer Emilia (1998).
- The towers were featured in the closing shot of Demi Lovato's lyric video for the song "I Love Me".
- The towers are featured in the Guns N' Roses song "Paradise City" when band member Duff McKagan is seen taking a boat ride on the East River.
- Guns N' Roses filmed part of their music video "Don't Cry" on top of the South Tower.
- Bruce Springsteen mentioned the World Trade Center towers in his song "Darlington County" on his album Born in the U.S.A.
- Junko Ohashi's Magical album in 1984 features the World Trade Center towers on its cover.
- The video for Ryan Adams's song "New York, New York" featured Adams performing in front of the Manhattan skyline, including the towers, and was filmed on September 7, 2001, four days before the attack. After the attacks, Adams dedicated the video to all the 9/11 victims.
- The towers can be seen multiple times throughout the music video for Glenn Frey's song "You Belong to the City".
- Corona's 1995 CD single "The Rhythm of the Night" features the World Trade Center towers on its cover.
- The towers can be seen behind the Empire State Building in the background of the Oasis album Standing On The Shoulder Of Giants, released in 2000.
- The towers briefly appear in the music video for the Crowded House song "It's Only Natural".
- The World Trade Centre and its Twin Towers appear throughout the music video of ”Move Mania” by Sash!, filmed in Manhattan in August 1998.
- The towers can be seen multiple times throughout the music video for Reel 2 Real featuring The Mad Stuntman's 1993 song "I Like to Move It".
- The towers appear in the music video for Starship's "We Built This City".
- The towers appear in the music video for James Brown's "Living in America".
- Musician Barry Lyndon mentions 7 World Trade Center (1987–2001) in several of his songs, including the appropriately titled Building Seven.

== Video games ==
- The action game New York City, released in November 1983 for the Atari 8-bit, features a silhouette of the Twin Towers.
- The LaserDisc arcade game Cobra Command (1984) features the Twin Towers prominently in the New York City level.
- Microsoft Flight Simulator 2.0 features the Twin Towers in New York City.
- The 1985 arcade game City Connection features a panoramic shot of Manhattan, including the World Trade Center, during the game's first stage placed in New York.
- The 1988 arcade game Vigilante features a panoramic shot of New York City on the title screen, including the World Trade Center. This same title screen was included in the TurboGrafx-16 version. In the background during gameplay is the New York skyline, including the World Trade Center's Twin Towers.
- Manhunter: New York (1988) features establishing shots of the city, including the Twin Towers, in an alternate future where the world is taken over by the Orbs.
- Ninja Gaiden's (1988) second stage shows Ryu Hayabusa beating down some gangs in New York City as the World Trade Center is shown in the background.
- Buster Bros. (1989) features shots of the city with the Twin Towers predominantly visible in the background, on stages 40–42 - the New York City based levels.
- The 1990 arcade game The Combatribes features the World Trade Center on the title screen as the game's action takes place across New York. The 1992 Super NES version of the game shows the characters heading back towards the Twin Towers in the ending cutscene.
- Streets of Rage, a game released in 1991 on the Sega Genesis, features the Twin Towers in the background of the final boss battle at the end credits, which occurs in one of the buildings surrounding the towers.
- Two Crude (1991) is a beat 'em up set in New York City in the year '2010 AD'. The Twin Towers are depicted in the intro about a post-apocalyptic New York in control by a criminal gang with biohazard weapons; they are also a focal point in the start screen.
- Streets of Rage 2 (1992), sequel to Streets of Rage, features the World Trade Center in the game's opening scene.
- King of the Monsters 2 (1992) for the Neo-Geo has the Twin Towers in the first level, and the game provides a bonus for destroying them.
- Cadillacs and Dinosaurs (1993) begins with a panoramic view of New York in the year 2513, where the World Trade Center can be seen in the background.
- Ninja Baseball Bat Man (1993) for the arcade features the New York City skyline in the final stage, including the World Trade Center.
- The arcade game Zero Team features the World Trade Center at the end of the first level.
- In Aero Fighters 2 (1994) for the Neo-Geo, the first half of the U.S. level takes place in New York City, featuring the World Trade Center in the background. The player is able to destroy the buildings, along with all the others in New York City.
- The 1994 action game Urban Strike, the third in the Strike series, features a scene where a giant laser deflects from a satellite, hitting the Twin Towers. Further missions take place involving the effects of this laser at the World Trade Center. Ironically, the game takes place in a fictional/alternate 2001 timeline.
- Tekken 2 (1995) for the arcade and the PlayStation features the World Trade Center in Paul Phoenix's stage.
- Cruis'n World (1996) for the arcade and the Nintendo 64 features the World Trade Center Twin Towers in the New York level on the left side of the screen.
- Gunblade NY (1996) for the arcade features the Twin Towers.
- Rampage World Tour (1997) for the arcade, PlayStation, Sega Saturn, and Nintendo 64 features the New York skyline with the Twin Towers in the background to the left during the New York City level.
- Parasite Eve (1998), set in Manhattan and making direct remarks to areas such as Central Park, features 1 and 2 World Trade Center in its opening FMV shot, as the camera slowly pulls out of a close-up of the Statue of Liberty.
- In the 1998 Nintendo 64 game Rush 2: Extreme Racing USA, the entire World Trade Center complex is featured on the 'New York: Downtown' track. Buildings 1–6 and the western pedestrian bridge are all accessible to drive around. The stairways on both sides of the complex double as jumps for the racers.
- Rampage 2: Universal Tour (1999) for the PlayStation, and Nintendo 64 features the Twin Towers as fully destructible buildings during the New York City level.
- The 1999 PC game Sim City 3000 features the North and South Towers as buildable landmarks. Both towers appear to be the South Tower, however, as both have the South Tower's observation deck, and the North Tower lacks the antenna.
- In Hybrid Heaven (1999) for the Nintendo 64, in the main title screen, it shows the World Trade Center in New York City at nighttime.
- Driver (1999) features 1 and 2 World Trade Center, as well as The Sphere, in its depiction of New York – the final city unlocked. On "Take a Ride" mode, the player starts on a road just south of (and facing) the South Tower. On original issues of the game, the box art showed the Twin Towers. In later issues of the game released after 9/11, the Twin Towers were removed from the box art.
- The 1999 racing video game Test Drive 6 features the Twin Towers in one of its race courses, which is based on New York City. The buildings appear as part of the course's scenery, as well as its loading screen.
- The Twin Towers appear briefly in the opening, the first level, and at the end of the arcade game Smashing Drive (2000). The GameCube and Xbox versions, released after September 11, 2001, has the towers omitted.
- The Twin Towers appear briefly in the first level of the arcade video game 18 Wheeler: American Pro Trucker (2000). The PlayStation 2 version, released after September 11, 2001, has the towers omitted.
- The first level of the 2000 video game Deus Ex (set in 2052) encompasses Liberty Island and a bombed Statue of Liberty. The section of the New York City skyline containing the Twin Towers is absent, to reduce memory requirements for the map. The reason that the developers gave, if anyone asked, was that they had been destroyed by terrorists: "We just said that the Towers had been destroyed too, and this was way before 9/11... years. That's kind of freaky."
- Midnight Club: Street Racing (2000) features the entire WTC complex, where players can drive into the Austin Tobin Plaza in between the Twin Towers. They can also gain access to the underground parking garage beneath the World Trade Center (the site of the February 26, 1993 bombing).
- Shortly after the attacks, the now defunct Westwood Studios pulled all remaining copies of the 2000 real-time strategy game Command & Conquer: Red Alert 2, whose box contained artwork of New York City under attack by invading Soviet forces; notable landmarks depicted under attack included the World Trade Center and the Statue of Liberty. The single player campaign of the game also contained a pair of missions in which the player was instructed to destroy The Pentagon and capture the World Trade Center, as well as being able to destroy it. Westwood retooled the box art before re-releasing the game.
- The towers can be seen in a poster for The Legend of Zelda: Majora's Mask.
- Propeller Arena (2001) was a cancelled Dreamcast aerial dogfight game, since leaked on the internet, that features a Twin Towers-style building.
- Max Payne (2001) features the World Trade Center in several billboards for the fictional company "Aesir" and during the graphic novel cutscenes. They are also visible in the background in the beginning of the mission "The American Dream". The buildings were visible in the PC version of the game, however they were removed from the game's PlayStation 2 and Xbox ports, which were released in December 2001. The Game Boy Advance, Android, and iOS versions re-inserted the towers.
- In Trade Center Defender (2001), a flash-arcade game released on September 12, 2001, players had to shoot down planes that were heading towards the towers. If an aircraft managed to get through the buildings, the towers would pulverize. On September 13, the game was removed from sale over the internet. Lycos apologized for the game and pulled it from Angelfire arcade. By late September, the game was remade by French website Uzinagaz and was titled New York Defender. Unlike in the original game, the burning towers in the remake were made to look more realistic and similar to how they were destroyed during the actual disaster. New York Defender can still be found today in arcade and flash gaming websites.
- Metal Gear Solid 2: Sons of Liberty (2001) featured a major plot on a ship going down the Hudson River, with the World Trade Center included. The building was cut from the game, delaying both games' releases.
- Spider-Man 2: Enter: Electro (2001), featured the roofs of both towers in the final stage. The level involved battling Electro and the antenna atop the North Tower was crucial in defeating the villain. The game was originally scheduled in North America on September 18, 2001, though the game was delayed after the attacks and released on October 17, 2001, with a modified final stage so that the buildings less resembled the Twin Towers. The PAL version of the game was never released prior to the attacks.
- In response to the events of September 11, Microsoft announced that future versions of Microsoft Flight Simulator would not include the Twin Towers in the game's New York City skyline. A patch was also made available to remove the World Trade Center from the existing versions of the simulator.
- In Grand Theft Auto III (2001), it is believed the World Trade Center was to make an appearance. Due to the city (Liberty City) being based on New York and the game being intended to be released in the autumn of 2001. Despite popular beliefs that the World Trade Center was entirely deleted and replaced with new buildings, the reality is the World Trade Center was never meant to be in the game, since Liberty City during this era was a mix between different American cities rather than being a New York parody. However, due to the attacks some changes were made to the final game; flight paths in game for the scripted plane AI were altered to fly farther away from the downtown area, a mission arc and character involving terrorism were removed, police cars were repainted to avoid resemblance to NYPD police cars, the player's ability to destroy commercial planes with rockets on the airport from the beta version was removed, and the game's cover in North America was changed to remove an explosion, creating the iconic cover that the franchise still carries to this day.
- The 2002 video game Spider-Man, the first game adaptation of the film, has a cutscene featuring the World Trade Center towers outside of Norman Osborn's office where Spider-Man enters.
- The 2004 video game Spider-Man 2, the game adaptation of the second film, features a virtual Manhattan which included a large plaza, bearing resemblance to the Tribute in Light memorial, on the World Trade Center site.
- The 2005 video game True Crime: New York City features a fenced-off "Ground Zero".
- In Tycoon City: New York (2006), the World Trade Center is paid tribute to in the form of two very tall trees standing side by side, representing the Towers. Further into the park, there is a Pentagon-shaped base, with the American flag at half mast. An inscription on the side reads We Will Never Forget.
- Driver: Parallel Lines (2006) features a slightly modified World Trade Center complex in the game's depiction of 1978 New York City, lacking the Marriott World Trade Center hotel and 7 World Trade Center (since both were completed in the 1980s). The complex also features The Sphere sculpture, though unlike the real World Trade Center, a road divides the complex in two. In the game's latter half, set in 2006, the entire area is replaced by a fenced-off building site.
- In World in Conflict (2007), the game's teaser trailer prominently features the skyline of New York City during a U.S. Ranger assault on Governor's Island, which has been occupied by the Soviets in an alternate timeline in which the Cold War culminates into World War III between the U.S. and the Soviet Union. The game is set in an alternate 1989, 12 years before 9/11. In the tenth level, "Liberty Lost", the World Trade Center is featured prominently in the background during the player's efforts to recapture Governor's, Ellis, and Liberty Islands.
- In Rhythm Heaven Fever (2011), the World Trade Center can be seen in the game exhibition match in a zoom out shot of the New York skyline. The Towers were modified in Rhythm Heaven Megamix.
- In 2020's G String, WTC 1 and 2 are rebuilt following the attacks. The game's antagonist funded the project and the towers are used as apartments and the seat of government.
