= Pilot (The Critic) =

- The Critic episode
- Episode no.: Season 1 Episode 1
- Directed by: Rich Moore
- Written by: Mike Reiss; Al Jean
- Original air date: January 26, 1994
- Running time: 22 minutes

Guest appearances
- Jennifer Lien as Valerie Fox; Gene Shalit as himself

Episode chronology
← Previous —	Next → "Marty's First Date"

"Pilot" (also known as "The Critic") is the first episode of the first season of the U.S. animated TV show The Critic, a series created by The Simpsons writers Al Jean and Mike Reiss which ran for the 1994 season. The episode was animated by Film Roman, and aired on ABC, January 26, 1994.

== Production ==
The A.V. Club explains "in creating The Critic, Al Jean and Mike Reiss set out to make the show as dissimilar from The Simpsons as humanly possible".

The character of Jay Sherman is "the butt of many of the jokes on The Critic but he's also an extraordinarily accomplished figure". For this reason the show needed to find the right balance between the two. The A.V. Club explains that "the pilot episode of The Critic errs on the side of making him seem altogether too accomplished".

The opening sequence, first seen in the pilot, "elegantly establishes the world Jay lives in, a world where, in the parlance of Jeff Daniels in The Squid and the Whale, people read books and see interesting movies and care about art and ideas".

== Plot ==
According to TV.com, the synopsis is "When Jay has actress, Valerie Fox, on his show, they both fall in love with each other and get involved in a caring relationship. A relationship that may be threatened if Jay pans her performance in her new movie."

== Cast ==
Cast reads as follows:

- Jon Lovitz as Jay Sherman and Woody Allen
- Nancy Cartwright as Margo and additional voices
- Christine Cavanaugh as Marty Sherman and additional voices
- Jennifer Lien as Valerie Fox
- Gerrit Graham as Franklin Sherman
- Doris Grau as Doris Grossman
- Judith Ivey as Elanor Sherman
- Gene Shalit as himself
- Nick Jameson as Vlada Veramirovich and additional voices
- Maurice LaMarche as Jeremy Hawke and additional voices
- Charles Napier as Duke Phillips
- Kath Soucie as various characters
- Brenda Vaccaro as Ardeth
- Margaret Cho

== Cultural references ==
The movie spoofs/parodies in this episode include:

- Family Affair: The Motion Picture (Family Affair)
- Home Alone 5 (Home Alone)
- Rabbi PI (Magnum PI)
- Crocodile Gandhi (Crocodile Dundee)
- Kiss of Death (Touch of Death)

== Critical reception ==
The A.V. Club notes "Watching The Critic in 2011 is an exercise in nostalgia: the very first image is of the World Trade Center’s Twin Towers resting high atop the rest of a now sadly outdated New York skyline." It explains that "many of the episode’s sharpest gags pit Jay’s battered dignity against a world that never stops mocking him [and] Jon Lovitz...gives the character a perpetually wounded dignity that’s incongruously hilarious". It says "the big problem with the series’ pilot lies with the character of the starlet/girlfriend/actress", arguing that she is merely a "plotpoint rather than a flesh and blood character, a way of compromising Jay’s ethics rather than an autonomous human being". It adds "like pretty much all première episodes, The Critic's has a lot to unpack. It’s not as quick or as dense as it could be because it has characters to introduce and a rich, lovely, and multi-faceted milieu to introduce", but says "the show had a strong, clear voice and sensibility from the very beginning. It knew exactly what it wanted to do and how it wanted to do it".

== Nielsen ratings ==
The original airing of the episode easily won its timeslot, earning a 15.5 household rating and a 23 percent audience share, ranking 16th out of 92 programs that week, and was watched by 26.5 million viewers.

== Home media ==
The episode was included in the 2004 DVD release of The Critic. The commentary was performed by creators/executive producers/writers Mike Reiss and Al Jean, actors Maurice LaMarche and Nick Jameson and director Rich Moore.
