= Vampire State Building =

Vampire State Building may refer to:

- a fictional building in the Futurama episode Meanwhile
- a French language graphic novel illustrated by Charlie Adlard (ISBN 978-2302075450)
