= Ken Keeler =

American television producer and writer (born 1961)

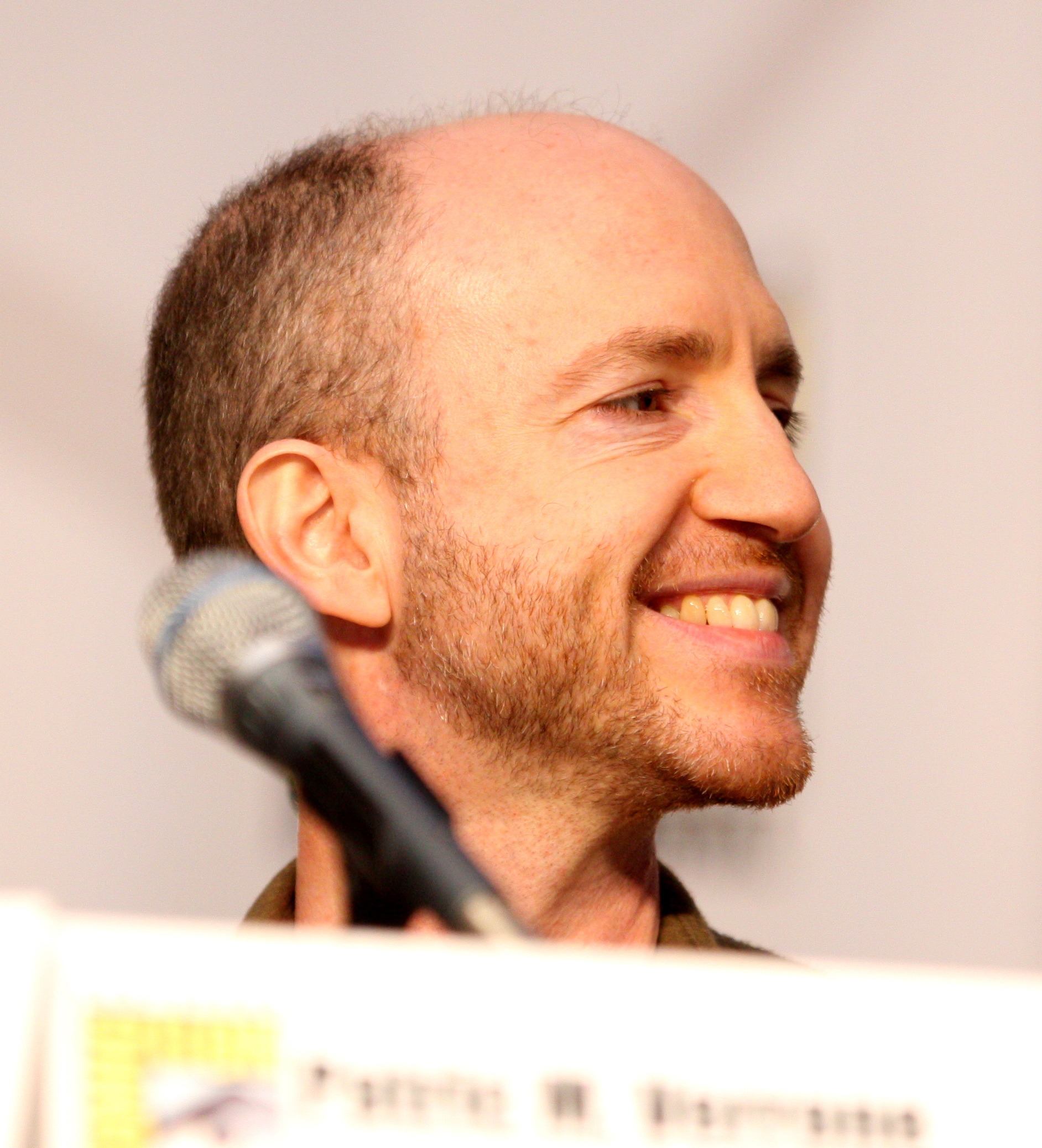
- Keeler at the 2010 San Diego Comic-Con
- Education: Harvard University (BA, PhD); Stanford University (MA)
- Occupation: Television writer
- Writing career
- Period: 1992–present
- Genre: Comedy

Ken Keeler is an American television producer and writer. He has written for numerous television series, most notably The Simpsons and Futurama. According to an interview with David X. Cohen, he proved a theorem that appears in the Futurama episode "The Prisoner of Benda".

== Education and early career ==
Keeler studied applied mathematics at Harvard University, graduating summa cum laude in 1983. He then gained a master's degree from Stanford in electrical engineering before returning to Harvard. He earned a PhD in applied mathematics from Harvard in 1990. His doctoral thesis was "Map Representations and Optimal Encoding for Image Segmentation".

After earning his doctorate, Keeler joined the Performance Analysis Department at AT&T Bell Laboratories.

== Career ==
Keeler soon left Bell Labs to write for David Letterman and subsequently for various sitcoms, including several episodes of Wings, The Simpsons, Futurama, and The Critic, as well as the short-lived Fox claymation show The PJs. For The Simpsons, Keeler has written such episodes as "A Star Is Burns" (which series creator Matt Groening refused to be credited for, as he was opposed to the idea of The Simpsons crossing over with The Critic) and "The Principal and the Pauper" (which many fans – including Groening and voice actor Harry Shearer – disliked due to the massive changes in Principal Skinner's backstory).

Keeler was instrumental in the creation of Futurama, and served as a co-executive producer in its first three years, and as an executive producer in its fourth year. He was one of the show's most prolific writers, with fourteen episodes to his name (including the original series finale, "The Devil's Hands Are Idle Playthings", the Writers Guild Award-winning episodes "Godfellas" and "The Prisoner of Benda," and the second series finale "Meanwhile"). Keeler wrote many of the original songs on both The Simpsons and Futurama during his time with the shows. He also wrote the direct-to-DVD Futurama movies Bender's Big Score and Into the Wild Green Yonder.

== Writing credits ==
=== The Simpsons episodes ===
- "A Star Is Burns" (1995)
- "Two Bad Neighbors" (1996)
- "Treehouse of Horror VII" ("The Thing and I") (1996)
- "El Viaje Misterioso de Nuestro Jomer (The Mysterious Voyage of Homer)" (1997)
- "Brother from Another Series" (1997)
- "The Simpsons Spin-Off Showcase" (story) (1997)
- "The Principal and the Pauper" (1997)

=== Futurama episodes and films ===
- "The Series Has Landed" (1999)
- "When Aliens Attack" (1999)
- "Put Your Head on My Shoulders" (2000)
- "Anthology of Interest I" (Part 2) (2000)
- "The Honking" (2000)
- "Time Keeps on Slippin'" (2001)
- "Godfellas" (2002)
- "The Devil's Hands Are Idle Playthings" (2003)
- Futurama: Bender's Big Score (film: teleplay, co-writer script) (2008)
- Futurama: Into the Wild Green Yonder (film: teleplay & co-writer script) (2009)
- "The Prisoner of Benda" (2010)
- "The Tip of the Zoidberg" (2011)
- "Overclockwise" (2011)
- "The Six Million Dollar Mon" (2012)
- "Forty Percent Leadbelly" (2013)
- "Meanwhile" (2013)
- "How the West Was 1010001" (2023; credited as Nona di Spargement)
- "Otherwise" (2024; credited as Nona di Spargement)
- "Our Flag Means Medical Coverage" (2026; credited as Nona di Spargement)

=== The Critic episodes ===
- "A Day at the Races and a Night at the Opera"
- "Dukerella"

=== Wings episodes ===
- "Fay There, Georgy Girl"

== Personal life ==
Keeler is also a fan of (but of no relation to) Harry Stephen Keeler and won the fifth and twelfth annual Imitate Keeler Competitions. His Futurama episode "Time Keeps on Slippin'" was partly inspired by the Harry Stephen Keeler story "Strange Romance" from the novel Y. Cheung, Business Detective.
