= List of The Critic characters =

This is a list of characters in the animated television series The Critic.

== Overview ==
Character	Voiced by	The Critic			The Simpsons crossover
Character	Voiced by	Season 1	Season 2	Season 3	"A Star Is Burns"
Character	Voiced by	1994	1995	2000–2001	1995
Main characters
Jay Sherman	Jon Lovitz	Main	Main	Main	Main
Martin "Marty" Sherman	Christine Cavanaugh	Main	Main		
Ardeth	Brenda Vaccaro (season 1); Rhea Perlman (season 2)	Main	Main		
Margo Sherman	Nancy Cartwright	Main	Main		
Franklin Sherman	Gerrit Graham	Main	Main		
Duke Phillips (né Scabies)	Charles Napier	Main	Main		
Jeremy Hawke	Maurice LaMarche	Main	Main		
Doris Grossman	Doris Grau	Main	Main		
Eleanor Sherman (née Wigglesworth)	Judith Ivey	Main	Main		
Alice Tompkins	Park Overall		Main		
Vlada Veramirovich	Nick Jameson	Recurring	Recurring	Main	
Jennifer	Valerie Levitt			Main	
Recurring characters
Principal Mangosuthu	Maurice LaMarche	Recurring	Recurring		
Shackleford	Maurice LaMarche	Recurring	Recurring		
Penny Tompkins	Russi Taylor		Recurring		
Zoltan Veramirovich	Nick Jameson	Recurring	Recurring		
Humphrey the Hippo	Tress MacNeille	Recurring	Recurring		
Guest stars
Gene Shalit		Guest	Guest		
Jimmy Breslin		Guest	Guest		
Rex Reed		Guest	Guest		
Kareem Abdul-Jabbar		Guest	Guest		
Steve Allen		Guest			
Bob Costas		Guest			
Rod McKuen		Guest			
Geraldo Rivera		Guest			
Rod Steiger		Guest			
Adam West		Guest			
Margaret Cho		Guest			
Chauffeur	Michael Carrington	Guest			
Gary Grossman	Billy Crystal	Guest			
Valerie Fox	Jennifer Lien	Guest			
Jay's No. 1 Fan	Pamela Reed	Guest			
Adolph Hitmaker	Phil Hartman	Guest			
Homer Simpson	Dan Castellaneta	Guest			Main
Bart Simpson	Nancy Cartwright	Guest			Main
June Lockhart			Guest		
Milton Berle			Guest		
Gene Siskel			Guest		
Roger Ebert			Guest		
Ricki Lake			Guest		
Queen Latifah			Guest		
Jay Leno	Judd Apatow		Guest		
Olivia Hawke	Morwenna Banks		Guest		
Johnny Wrath	Todd Louiso		Guest		
Cyrus Tompkins	Sam McMurray		Guest		
Arnold Schwarzenegger	Nick Jameson			Guest	
Daniel Radcliffe	Nick Jameson			Guest	
Nick Jameson	Nick Jameson			Guest	
Mark Wahlberg	Nick Jameson			Guest	
Leonardo DiCaprio	Nick Jameson			Guest	
Tom Cruise	Nick Jameson			Guest	
Russell Crowe	Nick Jameson			Guest	
Hugh Jackman	Nick Jameson			Guest	
Patrick Stewart	Nick Jameson			Guest	
Ian McKellen	Nick Jameson			Guest	
Pikachu	Tress MacNeille			Guest	
Kathleen Turner	Tress MacNeille			Guest	
Emma Watson	Tress MacNeille			Guest	
Jodie Foster	Tress MacNeille			Guest	
Kate Winslet	Tress MacNeille			Guest	

== The Sherman family ==
=== Jay Sherman ===
Jay Sherman (voiced by Jon Lovitz) is the host of Phillips Broadcasting's Coming Attractions. He is known for his surly and sarcastic putdowns of nearly every film he sees (an act that has earned him disdain from the public and rather low ratings). His favorite films are usually Golden-Age classics (Citizen Kane and Mr. Smith Goes to Washington) and foreign films such as The Red Balloon. He often uses the "Shermometer" to measure the films he reviews, or a list of diseases he would rather have than see a movie. Jay is the adopted son of wealthy New England socialites Franklin and Eleanor Sherman, who originally thought he was a monkey. He is ethnically Jewish, but did not have a religious upbringing.

Jay is a heterosexual whose sexual and romantic relationships with women are the subject of most plotlines on the series. However, his artistic interests and effeminate mannerisms often make Jay the target of anti-gay insults from others. In the second season, Jay begins a long-term relationship with Alice Tompkins, a Tennessee woman living in New York whom Jay meets on the street and later hires as his personal assistant.

=== Martin Sherman ===
Martin Sherman (voiced by Christine Cavanaugh) is Jay Sherman's son. He usually stays with his mother, but visits Jay often. Like Jay, he is overweight, which causes him problems at United Nations International School. He was elected eighth-grade student body president thanks to a speech written by his father. In the second-season episode "From Chunk to Hunk", he lost a lot of weight, but found his new thin body to be more trouble than it was worth and gained it all back before the end of the episode.

=== Ardeth ===
Ardeth (voiced by Brenda Vaccaro in the first season, Rhea Perlman in the second season) is Jay's ex-wife. The two fell in love while Ardeth was treating Jay during a period in which he was completely bandaged and gagged. She instantly regretted marrying Jay, admitting so during the wedding ceremony. They spent their wedding night on The Newlywed Game, which they won.

Despite her dislike of Jay, Ardeth shares Jay's affection for their only son Marty and even goes so far as to admit, "We raised a great kid." She is often seen when Marty is in a show or event. She has a handsome rich personal trainer and boyfriend named Alberto.

=== Margo Sherman ===
Margo Sherman (voiced by Nancy Cartwright) is the younger child of the Sherman family, and the only biological child of Franklin and Eleanor. She is 17 years old and is a junior at Miss Hathaway's School for Untouched Girls. Margo is an activist who often protests her mother's socialite lifestyle. She also cares greatly for Jay, making sure his girlfriends are not just dating him to get good reviews and having him escort her to the debutante ball.

=== Franklin Sherman ===
Franklin Sherman (voiced by Gerrit Graham) is Jay's adoptive father and Eleanor's husband. His mental health is uncertain, and he often acts quite erratically. He is a 64-year-old "rich eccentric". A few of his oddities include burning down the house (this is explained by him forgetting to turn the oven off), becoming stuck to an ice sculpture, gluing the dog and silverware to the ceiling, dressing up as the Energizer Bunny, rubbing his behind on the dinner plates, wearing underpants on his head at the dinner table, and sticking a banana in his ear which he claimed was an attempt to lure the monkey out of his head.

Franklin is a former governor of New York, as well as a former ambassador, Cabinet member, a Rhodes scholar, and a heavy contributor to the Republican Party. Franklin was Duke Phillips's running mate when he ran for president, though Duke tried to remove Franklin after a disastrous vice presidential debate.

=== Eleanor Sherman (née Wigglesworth) ===
Eleanor Sherman (voiced by Judith Ivey) is Jay's adoptive mother and Franklin's wife. She is often embarrassed by her family and its eccentricities. Eleanor seeks to have all poor people shot into space, and when she wrote a children's book about Jay called The Fat Little Pig, she promised to put all the profits toward that goal. She loves Jay but often shows humiliating photos of him. She is a little too concerned with her outward appearance, despite her lack of tear ducts and having the ability to cry bred out of her family.

== Others ==
=== Duke Phillips ===
Duke Phillips (voiced by Charles Napier) is Jay's boss, and head of Phillips Broadcasting. He runs the network that shows Coming Attractions, and is always trying to change things to increase ratings and maximize profits. Phillips previously ran for president, with Franklin Sherman as his running mate. Phillips believes Jay is gay and in love with him, and wastes no opportunity to belittle him in public about this. Towards the end of the series, Phillips marries Alice Tompkins' sister Miranda.

=== Jeremy Hawke ===
Jeremy Hawke (voiced by Maurice LaMarche) is an Australian actor, and is Jay's best friend since Jay gave his first film its only positive review. Best known as the star of the "illogical, blasphemous, and ultra-violent" Crocodile Gandhi series, Hawke has starred in multiple action films and played former president James Monroe (as a spoof of James Bond e.g. "Monroe, James Monroe").

=== Doris Grossman ===
Doris Grossman (voiced by Doris Grau) is Jay's make-up artist. She is a 65-year-old chain smoker, only has one lung and anytime a cigarette is removed from her mouth a new one appears. Doris lives in a very spacious and luxurious apartment, affordable to her since it has been "rent controlled since 1946", and also for the fact that Duke pays her $300,000 per annum, believing that this was what average people earned. Doris was previously a commercial actress for Phleghm Fatale Cigarettes, but her career in acting ended after she "got knocked up by the Fruit of the Loom banana."

=== Alice and Penny Tompkins ===
Alice Tompkins (voiced by Park Overall) is Jay's girlfriend. She is initially married to country singer Cyrus Tompkins, but she leaves him when she begins to suspect he is cheating on her. Alice moves to New York from Knoxville, Tennessee, to show her 5-year-old daughter Penny (voiced by Russi Taylor) that a woman can make it without a man. Cyrus tracks Alice to New York and tries to seduce her, but his attempts get thwarted by Jay. Alice has an older sister named Miranda, who has usurped her popularity many times over the years.

Alice was originally an artist and is capable of perfectly replicating art masterworks on the walls of her apartment (such as Michelangelo's The Creation of Adam and Georges-Pierre Seurat's A Sunday Afternoon on the Island of La Grande Jatte). She pepper-sprayed Jay upon first meeting him on the street, an act he shrugged off (even enjoyed). She then accepted Jay's offer to work as his personal assistant. It is in the episode "Lady Hawke" that she realizes she has fallen in love with Jay, and the two become a couple at the end of the episode.

=== Vlada and Zoltan Veramirovich ===
Vlada Veramirovich (voiced by Nick Jameson) is a 40-year-old Eastern-European immigrant who runs the restaurant L'ane Riche (French for "The Wealthy Jackass"), which Jay and Jeremy frequent. Vlada frequently makes insulting remarks about Jay to the restaurant staff or quietly directs them to give him a bad table and poor-quality food. Best known for his greeting to Jay, "Ahhh, Meeester Sherman!" he has a keen understanding of who is hot and who is not in New York and a posse built for schmoozing. Zoltan, Vlada's son, attends the same UN School as Jay's son Marty.

=== Principal Mangosuthu ===
Mangosuthu (voiced by Maurice LaMarche) is the principal of United Nations International School. He is African and can be sarcastic and scornful, often ending his remarks with a loud, bellowing laugh. He is known for making numerous yet ridiculous puns.

=== Shackleford ===
Shackleford (voiced by Maurice LaMarche) is the Sherman family's butler. He is not particularly loyal to the famil, but stays with them for the money and fringe benefits. Shackleford is particularly contemptuous toward Jay, referring to him as "Adopted Master Jay", with a tone that suggest that he does not consider Jay to be a true member of the family.

=== Humphrey the Hippo ===
A parody of Barney the Dinosaur, Humphrey (voiced by Tress MacNeille) is a popular children's host dressed as a giant green hippopotamus. While children love the show—when Jay made Humphrey sad, outraged children demanded his thumbs be broken—the kids who co-star with Humphrey rejoice when they think Humphrey is dead.

=== The Devil ===
Appearing in several episodes, Jay blames the Devil (voiced by Maurice LaMarche) for many of Hollywood's problems. He was once contacted by the cast of Wings, who wanted to stay on the air for another year. However, the Devil refuses, stating that this is outside his power. He also disguised himself as a potential replacement for Roger Ebert.

== Guest stars ==
Throughout the show's run, other famous critics also guest-voiced as themselves. Gene Shalit and Rex Reed appeared in multiple episodes. Shalit even appeared in a webisode. The duo Gene Siskel and Roger Ebert also appeared in a special second-season episode "Siskel & Ebert & Jay & Alice."

Other famous media personalities voicing themselves included Geraldo Rivera, Adam West, Kareem Abdul-Jabbar, Jimmy Breslin, Bob Costas, Rod Steiger, Steve Allen, Ricki Lake, Queen Latifah, June Lockhart, and Milton Berle.

=== Celebrities impersonated ===
The following celebrities that are impersonated are listed in alphabetical order by last name:

- Woody Allen (voiced by Jon Lovitz)
- Ingrid Bergman as Isla Lund from Casablanca (voiced by Kath Soucie)
- Humphrey Bogart as Rick Blaine from Casablanca (voiced by Maurice LaMarche)
- Jim Carrey (voiced by Maurice LaMarche)
- Fidel Castro
- Cher
- Bill Clinton (voiced by Maurice LaMarche)
- Bill Cosby (voiced by Maurice LaMarche)
- Kevin Costner
- Tony Curtis (voiced by Maurice LaMarche)
- William Devane (voiced by Maurice LaMarche)
- Clint Eastwood as Dirty Harry (voiced by Maurice LaMarche)
- Louise Fletcher as Nurse Ratchet from One Flew Over the Cuckoo's Nest (voiced by Kath Soucie)
- Jodie Foster as Clarice Starling (voiced by Kath Soucie)
- Michael J. Fox
- Jeff Goldblum (voiced by Maurice LaMarche)
- Tom Hanks (voiced by Maurice LaMarche)
- Charlton Heston (voiced by Maurice LaMarche)
- Dustin Hoffman as "Snowman" (voiced by Maurice LaMarche)
- Anthony Hopkins as Hannibal Lecter (voiced by Maurice LaMarche)
- Dennis Hopper (voiced by Maurice LaMarche)
- Vanilla Ice
- Michael Jackson (voiced by Maurice LaMarche)
- DeForest Kelley
- Ed Koch
- George Lazenby (voiced by Maurice LaMarche)
- Spike Lee (voiced by Michael Carrington)
- Madonna
- Rick Moranis (voiced by Maurice LaMarche)
- Demi Moore
- Dudley Moore as Arthur (voiced by Maurice LaMarche)
- Jack Nicholson (voiced by Maurice LaMarche)
- Conan O'Brien
- Catherine O'Hara (voiced by Kath Soucie)
- Al Pacino (voiced by Maurice LaMarche)
- Joe Pesci (voiced by Maurice LaMarche)
- Elvis Presley (voiced by Maurice LaMarche)
- Lisa Marie Presley (voiced by Kath Soucie)
- Claude Rains as Captain Louis Renault in Casablanca (voiced by Maurice LaMarche)
- Robert Redford
- Keanu Reeves (voiced by Maurice LaMarche)
- Will Sampson as "Chief" Bromden from One Flew Over the Cuckoo's Nest
- Arnold Schwarzenegger (voiced by Maurice LaMarche)
- Al Sharpton
- William Shatner (voiced by Maurice LaMarche)
- Christian Slater (voiced by Maurice LaMarche)
- Howard Stern (voiced by Maurice LaMarche)
- Patrick Stewart as Jean-Luc Picard (voiced by Maurice LaMarche)
- Sharon Stone
- Marcia Strassman (voiced by Kath Soucie)
- The Three Tenors (voiced by Maurice LaMarche)
- Jean Claude Van Damme (known as "Jean Paul Le Pope")
- Orson Welles (voiced by Maurice LaMarche)
- Dooley Wilson as Sam from Casablanca
