= Meanwhile (Futurama) =

- Futurama episode
- Episode no.: Season 7 Episode 26
- Directed by: Peter Avanzino
- Written by: Ken Keeler
- Production code: 7ACV26
- Original air date: September 4, 2013

Episode features
- Opening caption: Avenge Us

Episode chronology
← Previous "Stench and Stenchibility"	Next → "The Impossible Stream"
- Futurama season 7

"Meanwhile" is the twenty-sixth and final episode of the seventh season of the American animated television series Futurama, the 143rd episode of the series overall and the finale of the second run. The episode was written by Ken Keeler and directed by Peter Avanzino. It premiered on Comedy Central in the United States on September 4, 2013, along with Futurama Live, a special preshow and aftershow for the occasion.

Set in a retro-futuristic 31st century, the series follows the adventures of the employees of Planet Express, an interplanetary delivery company. Originally written as a conclusion to the series, the episode revolves around the romantic relationship between Philip J. Fry and Turanga Leela. Its plot revolves around Professor Farnsworth's latest invention – a device that allows the user to travel back in time by ten seconds. This thing soon becomes stolen and abused by Fry, who wants to use it for his marriage proposal to Leela.

"Meanwhile" was the fourth episode written to serve as a series finale to Futurama. It follows "The Devil's Hands Are Idle Playthings", Futurama: Into the Wild Green Yonder and "Overclockwise", all of which were additionally written by Ken Keeler. "Meanwhile" was watched by 2.21 million people in its original broadcast, making it the fifth most watched episode ever to originally air on Comedy Central, and it received acclaim from television critics. Following this episode's airing, the characters only subsequently appeared on The Simpsons crossover "Simpsorama" on November 9, 2014, until the series returned on Hulu for a new season in 2023, with "The Impossible Stream", which picks up directly after the events of "Meanwhile".

== Plot ==
After Leela is ejected into space and nearly killed due to a ride malfunction during a package delivery run to Luna Park, Fry becomes worried that he may lose her again and decides to propose to her. Back at the Planet Express building, the Professor announces a pair of his latest inventions – a "time button" that allows the user to go back in time by ten seconds, in addition to similarly affecting everything currently happening around them throughout the entire universe, and a shelter that shields people from the device's effects. Fry steals and abuses the button to repeatedly steal candidate diamonds for an engagement ring with Bender's help. After presenting the ring to Leela, he invites her to meet him atop the Vampire State Building at 6:30 that evening if she agrees to marry him, if not, he will infer rejection. He repeatedly uses the button to prolong the sunset, but she has not arrived by the time his watch reads 7:02. Heartbroken, he jumps off the roof in a suicide attempt, but sees her approaching and notes that the building's clock reads 6:25; his watch had continued to run normally throughout all his usages of the button. He tries to undo the jump, but is unable to return to the rooftop since the device takes ten seconds to recharge between uses and he has been falling for longer than that time. As a result, he continually loops falling toward the ground from several feet below the roof, failing to get to safety.

The Professor realizes that the time button has been stolen as he worries about the universe being in peril, while additionally warning that anyone who leaves the time shelter could be beyond reformation if the device is subsequently reused less than ten seconds later. After learning of Fry’s guilt in the device’s theft from Bender and using the shelter, the crew arrives at the Vampire State Building to save him. By this time, Fry is tired after falling for so long that he ends up letting go of the button. He instantly dies upon hitting the ground, but Leela picks up the button from Fry's splattered remains and uses it to undo the fatality. Emerging from the time shelter, the Professor tries to stop her and is seemingly vaporized when Leela presses the button. Following several failed attempts, Bender engineers an alternate method that involves an airbag he contains. The plan succeeds and Fry is finally saved, only for him to inadvertently land on the button, destroying it and causing time throughout the universe for everyone and everything except Fry and Leela to come to a complete halt.

With the world theirs alone, the couple conduct their wedding themselves and spend what is, for them, decades romantically wandering the stationary world. A mysterious glimmer bothers them from time to time, but otherwise, they are satisfied. In old age, they return to the Vampire State Building to drink the champagne that Fry had laid out there prior to the button's destruction. The glimmer finally reveals itself to be the Professor, who had actually been shifted into a different time frame instead of being killed. He has been trying to recover the time button all this time and, since Fry had kept it in spite of its current state, is able to repair it with a single modification – its next usage will return the entire universe to the point in time prior to its conception and wipe everyone's memories of all events since then. Despite having enjoyed growing old together, Fry and Leela both agree to relive their lives as the Professor presses the button.

== Reception ==
The original American broadcast of "Meanwhile" on September 4, 2013, was watched by 2.21 million households, making it the 5th most watched episode ever to originally air on Comedy Central.

"Meanwhile" received critical acclaim. Max Nicholson, for IGN, wrote that "Meanwhile" was "a fitting end to a classic animated series". He gave the episode a 9 out of 10.

Zack Handlen, writing for The A.V. Club, said that, "the first five minutes are passable but rushed, and the hook of Fry deciding he needed to ask Leela to marry him isn't all that exciting". However, he later went on to say that "this finale settles somewhere between the 'too happy' and the 'oh dear God when will it end', which makes it just about perfect. It has just about everything you could want from Futurama: there's a nifty time-travel plot, Fry and Leela get married, Bender is a jackass, Zoidberg loses $10, and Fry dies". He graded the episode an A.

Sean Gardert, writing for Paste, was relatively more critical and summarized that, "Not to say that 'Meanwhile' was a bad episode, as it was truly great, an epic 22 minutes that stood up to anything the show's done before. But after toeing up to that line of doing something truly impressive and revolutionary for the show, they backed away again. I was disappointed, to say the least, but I still look forward to catching this episode as a rerun, and have already written fanfiction in my head as to what would happen were Fry and Leela allowed to return to the past with all of their memories still intact."

IndieWire listed "Meanwhile" among their list of the best TV series finales.
