= A Star Is Burns =

- The Simpsons episode
- Episode no.: Season 6 Episode 18
- Directed by: Susie Dietter
- Written by: Ken Keeler
- Production code: 2F31
- Original air date: March 5, 1995

Guest appearances
- Jon Lovitz as Jay Sherman; Maurice LaMarche as George C. Scott, William Shatner, Jay Sherman’s burp, and Eudora Welty’s burp; Phil Hartman as actor (resembling Charlton Heston) playing Judah Ben-Hur in Mr. Burns' movie

Episode features
- Couch gag: The family’s heights are reversed; Maggie is now the largest while Homer is the smallest.
- Commentary: James L. Brooks; Al Jean; Mike Reiss; Ken Keeler; Dan Castellaneta; Jon Lovitz; Susie Dietter

Episode chronology
← Previous "Homer vs. Patty and Selma"	Next → "Lisa's Wedding"
- The Simpsons season 6

"A Star Is Burns" is the eighteenth episode of the sixth season of the American animated television series The Simpsons. It first aired on Fox in the United States on March 5, 1995. In the episode, Springfield decides to hold a film festival, and famed critic Jay Sherman is invited to be a judge.

The story involves a crossover with the animated series The Critic. Jay Sherman was the main character on the show. The Critic was created by Al Jean and Mike Reiss, who had previously written for The Simpsons but left following the fourth season, and produced by James L. Brooks, who was also a producer for The Simpsons. The show had premiered on ABC in January 1994, but was canceled despite positive critical reception. The series moved over to Fox in 1995 and was put in the timeslot directly after The Simpsons. Brooks pitched a crossover episode as a way to promote The Critic and decided that a film festival would be a good way to introduce Sherman; the episode is stand-alone, allowing it to be watched even by those unfamiliar with The Critic.

This is the only episode where Simpsons creator Matt Groening was not credited at all, despite his involvement. Groening has heavily criticized the episode, feeling that it was just an advertisement for The Critic, and that people would incorrectly associate the show with him. When he was unsuccessful in getting the program pulled, he had his name removed from the credits and went public with his concerns, openly criticizing Brooks.

The episode was directed by Susie Dietter and was the first episode to be written by Ken Keeler. Jon Lovitz, who voices Jay Sherman on The Critic itself, guest stars as Jay Sherman, while Maurice LaMarche (who was also a regular on The Critic) has a few minor roles. The episode received mixed reviews from critics, many of whom felt the crossover was out of place on the show, although Barney's film festival entry was well received.

== Plot ==
In response to Springfield being named the most unpopular city in the United States, a town meeting is held to decide how to attract more tourists. Marge proposes that Springfield host a film festival showcasing films made by the townspeople. To her surprise, the townspeople love her idea. Marge becomes the leader of the film festival's judging panel. She invites film critic Jay Sherman to be on the judging panel; Sherman agrees, primarily to escape the wrath of Rainier Wolfcastle, who is enraged that Sherman insulted his latest film. Sherman's quick wit, pop-culture savvy, and numerous awards cause Homer to feel inadequate, so he convinces Marge to put him on the judging panel as well, even though she had originally intended to invite Martin Scorsese instead of Homer.

The film festival commences, and many of the townspeople enter films. Festival attendees are particularly touched by Barney Gumble's artistic introspective film about alcoholism, titled Pukahontas, which Marge and Sherman foresee to be the eventual winner. Mr. Burns' film, directed by Steven Spielberg's non-union Mexican counterpart "Señor Spielbergo", is A Burns for All Seasons, a big-budget pastiche of famous Hollywood productions, intended to glorify him; the film is booed by the audience. Burns bribes two of the judges, Krusty the Clown and Mayor Quimby, to vote for his film, leading to a deadlock.

Left with the tie-breaking vote, Homer (who had missed the first showing of Pukahontas) enthusiastically votes for Hans Moleman's film Man Getting Hit by Football (which consists entirely of a scene showing Moleman being hit in the groin by a football and falling over) but Marge and Sherman convince him to reconsider, and after Homer watches Pukahontas in its entirety, he decides to vote for it. Pukahontas is named the winner of the film festival. In his acceptance speech, Barney declares that his victory has inspired him to give up drinking, but immediately rescinds his promise when Quimby reveals that the grand prize is a lifetime supply of Duff Beer.

Sherman prepares to return to New York, and the Simpsons thank him for his help in making the festival a success. Marge suggests that Mr. Burns has learned a lesson that you cannot bribe everyone. However, Burns submits A Burns for All Seasons to the Academy Awards; because he bribed "everyone in Hollywood", he is nominated for an Academy Award for Best Actor. At the ceremony, the winner is announced to be George C. Scott, for his performance in a remake of Man Getting Hit by Football, angering Burns further.

== Production ==
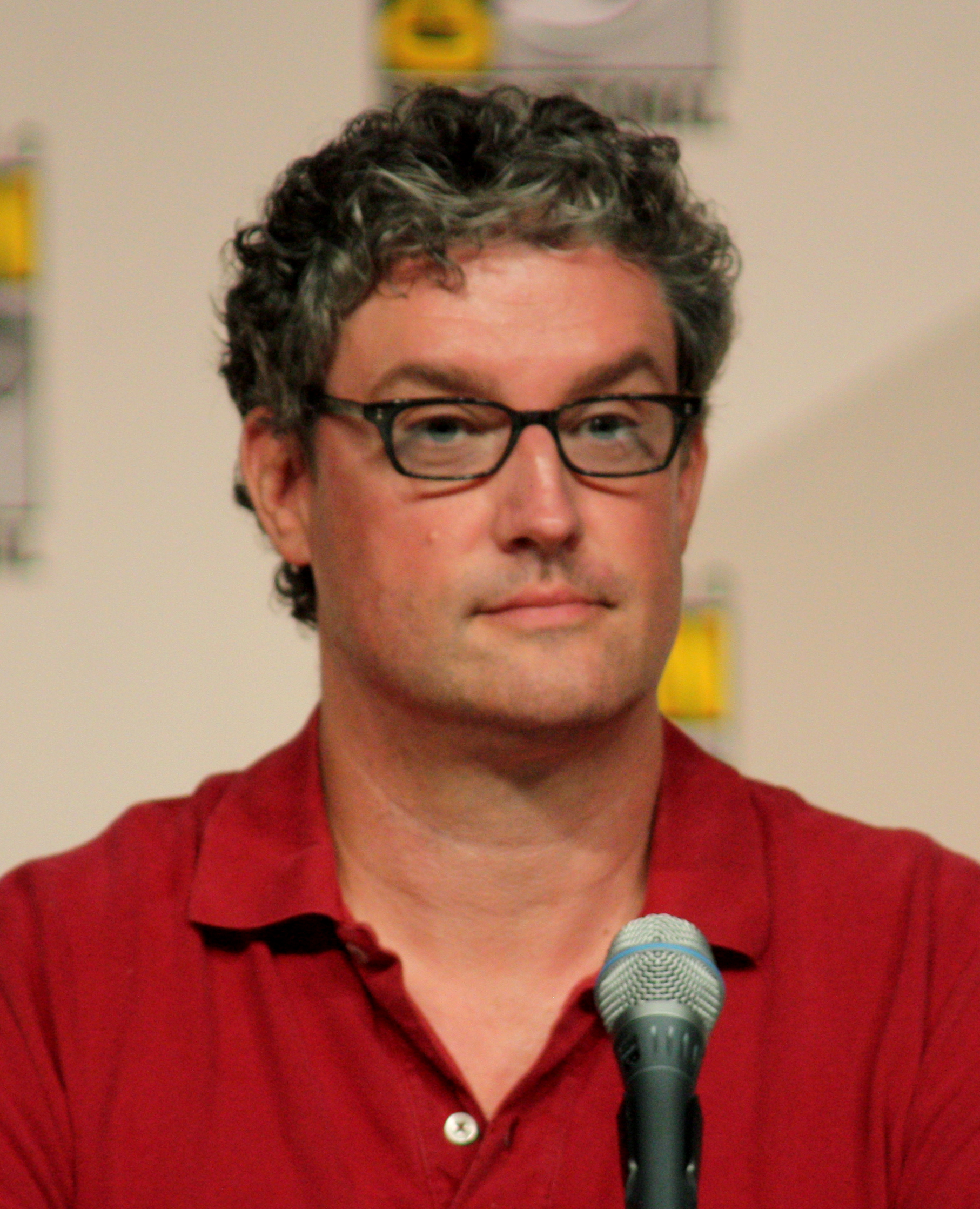
Al Jean had left The Simpsons after the fourth season, but returned to produce the episode.

The Critic was an animated series that revolved around the life of movie critic Jay Sherman. It was created by Al Jean and Mike Reiss, who had previously written for The Simpsons but left after the fourth season, and executive produced by James L. Brooks. Jon Lovitz, who had previously guest starred in several episodes of The Simpsons, starred as Jay Sherman, and it also featured the voices of Simpsons regulars Nancy Cartwright, Doris Grau, and Russi Taylor. It was first broadcast on ABC in January 1994, and was well received by critics. However, the series did not catch on with viewers and it was put on hiatus after six weeks. It returned in June 1994 and completed airing its initial production run.

For the second season of The Critic, James L. Brooks cut a deal with the Fox network to have the series switch over. The episode was pitched by Brooks, who had wanted a crossover that would help launch The Critic on Fox, and he thought having a film festival in Springfield would be a good way to introduce Sherman. After Brooks pitched the episode, the script was written by Ken Keeler. Although David Mirkin was executive producer for most of the sixth season, the episode was executive produced by Al Jean and Mike Reiss. Jay Sherman's appearance was given a makeover: he was made yellow and given an overbite.

Alongside Jon Lovitz, the episode guest stars Maurice LaMarche, a regular on The Critic, who voices George C. Scott as well as Jay Sherman's belch. Phil Hartman also makes a brief appearance as an actor resembling Charlton Heston portraying Judah Ben-Hur in Mr. Burns' film. Rainier Wolfcastle's line, "on closer inspection, these are loafers", was ad-libbed by Dan Castellaneta who was providing the voice of the character on a temporary track. It was later re-recorded by Wolfcastle's normal voice actor, Harry Shearer.

The episode contains a meta-reference to the fact that it is a crossover episode in a conversation Bart has with Sherman:

- [Bart is watching television] Announcer: Coming up next, The Flintstones Meet The Jetsons.
- Bart: Uh oh. I smell another cheap cartoon crossover.
- [Homer enters the room with Jay] Homer: Bart Simpson, meet Jay Sherman, the critic.
- Jay: Hello.
- Bart: Hey man, I really love your show. I think all kids should watch it! [turns away] Ew, I suddenly feel so dirty.

The joke was pitched by Al Jean.

== Cultural references ==
"The Imperial March" from The Empire Strikes Back is played as Mr. Burns is introduced. Burns says he wants Señor Spielbergo to do for him what Steven Spielberg did for Oskar Schindler, a reference to Spielberg's 1993 film Schindler's List. During the film festival, Spielberg's E.T. is parodied, with Burns in the role of the alien. Another movie Burns recreates is Ben-Hur. The character of Jay Sherman was based on Roger Ebert. The actors who attempt to impersonate Mr. Burns are intended to caricature Anthony Hopkins and William Shatner.

The song the "Rappin' Rabbis" play in the opening moments of the episode is a parody of "U Can't Touch This" by MC Hammer. The opening of Bart's movie The Eternal Struggle is a reference to The Amazing Criswell's narration in Plan 9 from Outer Space. Barney's movie contains references to Koyaanisqatsi, as well as its score composed by Philip Glass. Marge says "Did you know there are over 600 critics on TV and Leonard Maltin is the best looking of them all?" Lisa replies "Ewwww!"

During the town meeting organized to come up with ideas to increase Springfield's popularity, Selma proposes changing the name from "Springfield" to "Seinfeld", after which a bass riff is played, mimicking the theme music to the eponymous show composed by Jonathan Wolff.

Outside the Aztec Theater where the film festival is being hosted, Dr. Hibbert arrives dressed liked Frank-N-Furter, believing that they would be showing The Rocky Horror Picture Show that night.

== Reception ==
In its original broadcast, "A Star Is Burns" finished 57th in the ratings for the week of February 27 to March 5, 1995. The episode was the third highest rated show on the Fox network that week, beaten only by Melrose Place and Beverly Hills, 90210. The Critic, which premiered on Fox just after this episode, finished 64th.

The authors of the book I Can't Believe It's a Bigger and Better Updated Unofficial Simpsons Guide, Gary Russell and Gareth Roberts, wrote, "Jay Sherman perhaps proves here, even more so than in The Critic, just why that show failed. He's too flawed to be likeable." They added, "Barney's film is magnificent, but it's easy to see why Homer wants Hans Moleman to be the winner."

Adam Finley of TV Squad wrote, "the episode, even if I didn't care for it as a whole, does have moments that are still very Simpson-y, and still very funny. Jay's appearance, however, casts a shadow over everything that tends to leave a bad taste in my mouth."

Todd Gilchrist of IGN listed Barney's film as one of the best moments of the sixth season.

In 2014, The A.V. Club named Hans Moleman's line "I was saying 'Boo-urns'" and Mr. Burns' line "Then get me his [Steven Spielberg's] non-union, Mexican equivalent!" as two Simpsons quotes that can be used in everyday situations. In 2020, English filmmaker Rob Savage named his new production company BOO-URNS after the episode.

IGN ranked Jon Lovitz as the eighth best guest star in the show's history.

=== Controversy ===
Matt Groening was critical of the episode when it first released. He felt that the crossover was a thirty-minute advertisement and blamed James L. Brooks, calling it an attempt to get attention for one of his unsuccessful shows. After he was unable to get the episode pulled, he decided to go public with his concerns shortly before the episode aired. He stated that his reasons for doing so were that he hoped Brooks would have a change of heart and pull the episode, and that "articles began to appear in several newspapers around the country saying that [Groening] created The Critic." Groening had his name removed from the credits, so he does not receive his normal "created by" and "developed by" credits that air at the end of the opening sequence.

In response, Brooks said, "I am furious with Matt, he's been going to everybody who wears a suit at Fox and complaining about this. When he voiced his concerns about how to draw The Critic into the Simpsons' universe he was right and we agreed to his changes. Certainly he's allowed his opinion, but airing this publicly in the press is going too far. [...] He is a gifted, adorable, cuddly ingrate. But his behavior right now is rotten."

Al Jean and Mike Reiss, creators of The Critic, had previously worked on The Simpsons and had executive produced the third and fourth seasons. Brooks said, "for years, Al and Mike were two guys who worked their hearts out on this show, staying up until 4 in the morning to get it right. The point is, Matt's name has been on Mike's and Al's scripts and he has taken plenty of credit for a lot of their great work. In fact, he is the direct beneficiary of their work. The Critic is their shot and he should be giving them his support." Reiss stated that he was a "little upset" by Groening's actions and that "this taints everything at the last minute. [...] This episode doesn't say 'Watch The Critic' all over it." Jean added, "What bothers me about all of this, is that now people may get the impression that this Simpsons episode is less than good. It stands on its own even if The Critic never existed."

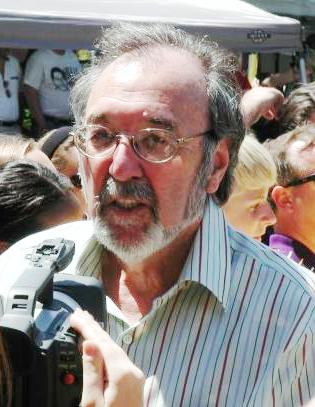
James L. Brooks stated that Groening's public complaints were "going too far".

Groening was criticized for going public with his complaints. Ray Richmond of the Los Angeles Daily News wrote, "Who's right? Well, Groening is probably correct in judging this an integrity issue. It's a fairly tacky bit of promotion, the kind generally beneath The Simpsons. But it's also true that little is accomplished by taking a gripe like this public. Quietly erasing his name from the credits would have been sufficient. [...] I admire the man's [decision to stand] up for his creative rights. But I question the way he's gone about it."

Additionally, Groening was also absent from the episode's commentary for The Complete Sixth Season DVD boxset.

=== Legacy ===
The Critic was ultimately short-lived, broadcasting ten episodes on Fox before its cancellation. A total of 23 episodes were produced, and it returned briefly in 2000 with a series of ten webisodes. The series has since developed a cult following as a result of reruns on Comedy Central and its complete series release on DVD.

Jay Sherman appeared and spoke briefly in two subsequent episodes of The Simpsons, "Hurricane Neddy" and "The Ziff Who Came to Dinner".

Idiomatic use of the phrase "say the quiet part loud" gained wide currency in the 2010s, chiefly in political discourse, to mean revealing an opinion usually expected to be kept from the public. It is derived from Krusty's line, "I said the quiet part loud and the loud part quiet", after unwittingly admitting to being bribed by Mr. Burns into choosing A Burns for All Seasons as the winning film. Additionally, television critics Alan Sepinwall and Matt Zoller Seitz have often quoted Homer's line, "Barney's movie had heart, but Football in the Groin had a football in the groin."
