= Al Jean =

American television writer and producer (born 1961)

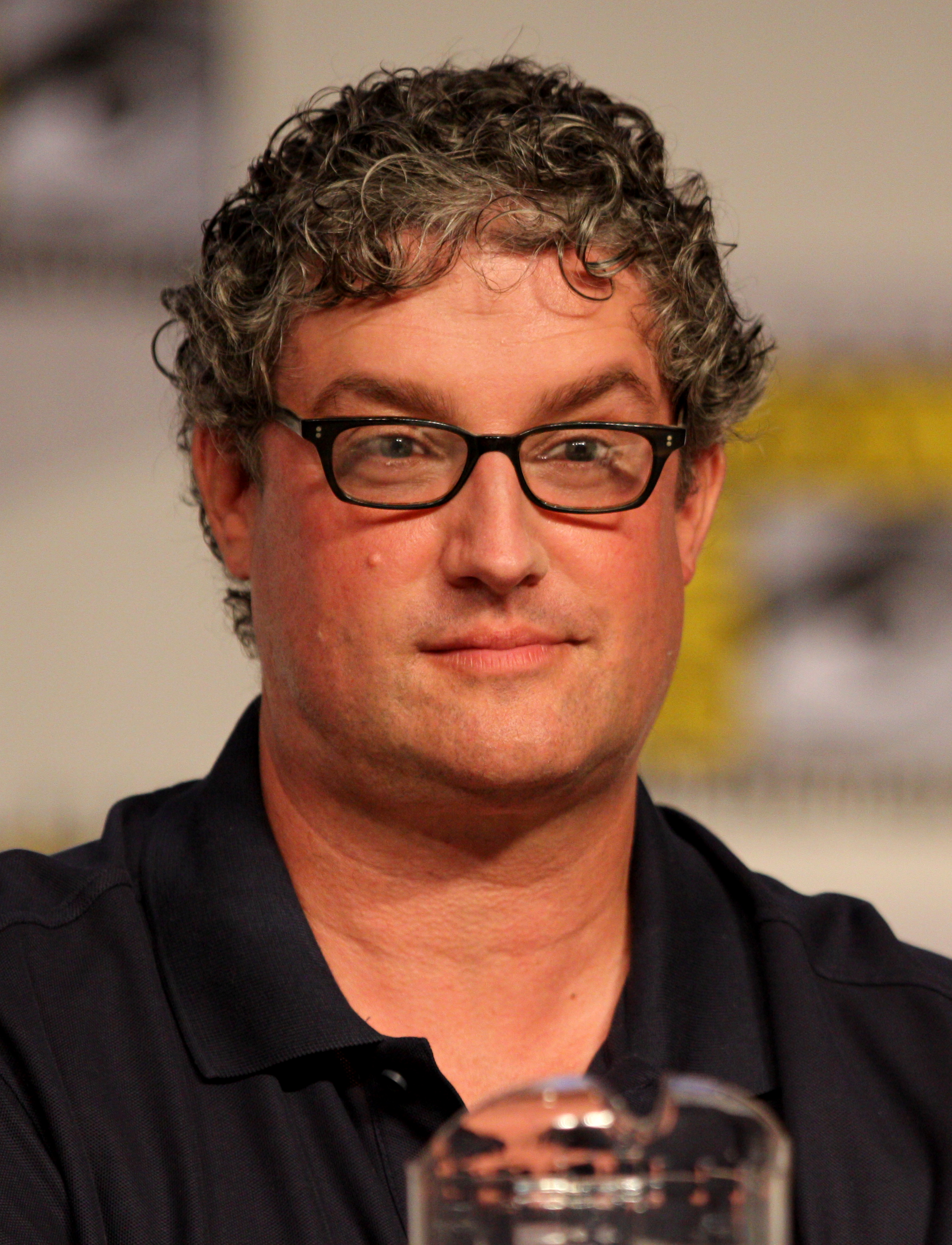
- Jean in 2010
- Born: Alfred Ernest Jean III; January 9, 1961 (age 65); Detroit, Michigan, U.S.
- Education: Harvard University
- Occupations: Writer; producer
- Spouse: Stephanie Gillis (m. 2002)
- Children: 2

Alfred Ernest Jean III (born January 9, 1961) is an American screenwriter and producer. Jean is well known for his work on The Simpsons. He was raised near Detroit, Michigan, and graduated from Harvard University in 1981. Jean began his writing career in the 1980s with fellow Harvard alum Mike Reiss. Together, they worked as writers and producers on television shows such as The Tonight Show Starring Johnny Carson, ALF and It's Garry Shandling's Show.

Jean was offered a job as a writer on the animated sitcom The Simpsons in 1989, alongside Reiss, and together they became the first members of the show's original writing staff. They served as showrunners during the show's third (1991–92) and fourth (1992–93) seasons, though they left The Simpsons after season four to create The Critic, an animated show about film critic Jay Sherman. It was first broadcast on ABC in January 1994 (then aired its second season on Fox in March 1995) and was well received by critics, but did not catch on with viewers and only lasted for two seasons.

In 1994, Jean and Reiss signed a three-year development deal with The Walt Disney Company to produce other television shows for ABC. Among multiple pitches made by the duo, their sole project with ABC to come to fruition was the live-action sitcom Teen Angel, which was cancelled in its first season. Jean returned full-time to The Simpsons during the tenth season (1998–99). He became showrunner again with the start of the thirteenth season in 2001, without Reiss, and he stayed in that position until season thirty-three, where he shared it with Matt Selman until season thirty-seven, where he stepped down from that position entirely. Jean was also one of the writers and producers who worked on The Simpsons Movie, a feature-length film based on the series, released in 2007.

== Early life ==
"At college, I was privileged to meet and work with some very talented writers who went on to work for Saturday Night Live, Seinfeld, Late Night with David Letterman and The Simpsons. No doubt my exposure to them at a very young age has been enormously helpful to my writing career."

— Jean on his time at Harvard University

Alfred Ernest Jean III was born in Detroit, Michigan on January 9, 1961. He was raised in Farmington Hills, Michigan, graduated from Harrison High School, and is of Irish ancestry. After working at his father's hardware store, Jean arrived at Harvard University when he was sixteen years old and graduated in 1981 with a bachelor's degree in mathematics. Daryl Libow, one of Jean's freshman roommates, said he was a "math whiz" when he arrived at Harvard but "soon blossomed and found his comedic feet." In Holworthy Hall at Harvard, Jean met fellow freshman Mike Reiss; they befriended one another and collaborated in their writing efforts for the humor publication Harvard Lampoon. Jeff Martin, another writer for the Lampoon, said "they definitely loomed large around the magazine. They were very funny guys and unusually polished comedy writers for that age. We were never surprised that they went on to success." Jean has also stated that the duo spent most of their time at the Lampoon, adding that "it was practically my second dorm room." He eventually became vice-president of the publication.

== Career ==
=== Early career and The Simpsons ===
The humor magazine National Lampoon hired Jean and Reiss after they graduated in 1981. During the 1980s, the duo began collaborating on various television material. During this period, they worked as writers and producers on television shows such as The Tonight Show Starring Johnny Carson, ALF, Sledge Hammer! and It's Garry Shandling's Show. In 1989, Jean was offered a job as a writer on the animated sitcom The Simpsons, a show created by Matt Groening, James L. Brooks and Sam Simon that continues to air today. Many of Jean's friends were not interested in working on The Simpsons because it was a cartoon and they did not think it would last long. Jean, however, was a fan of the work of Groening, Brooks and Simon, and therefore took the job together with Reiss.

The duo became the first members of the original Simpsons writing staff and worked on the thirteen episodes of the series' first season (1989–90). While watching the first episode of the show, "Simpsons Roasting on an Open Fire", premiering on television in December 1989, Jean opined to himself that the series was the greatest project he had been involved with and desired to continue working on it for the rest of his professional career. What he enjoyed most about The Simpsons at the time was something he recognized from Brooks' previous work: although the show was largely based on humor, it had depth and warmth.

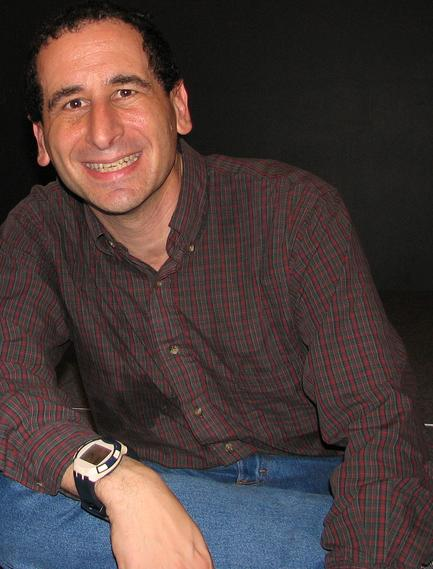
Mike Reiss and Jean worked as show runners of The Simpsons together.

Although Jean has been credited as the sole writer of several episodes, he considers the process to be mainly collaborative: "the principal writer [of an episode] has, at most, written 40% of the script. It's a real team effort." The writer credited in the episode's opening credits is the person that came up with the idea for the episode and wrote the first draft, even if he or she only contributed to a small part of the final script. Jean has stated that Lisa Simpson is one of his favorite characters to write for. She is the character he relates to the most because of their similar childhoods and the fact that he has a daughter.

Jean became showrunner of The Simpsons at the start of the third season (1991–92) together with Reiss. A showrunner has the ultimate responsibility of all the processes that an episode goes through before completion, including the writing, the animation, the voice acting and the music. According to Jean, when he began his tenure as showrunner, the only thing he thought to himself every day was "Don't blow it and screw up this thing everyone loves." The first episode Jean and Reiss ran was "Mr. Lisa Goes to Washington" (aired September 26, 1991), and they felt pressured to make it good, so much so that they did six to seven rewrites of the script in order to improve its humor. Jean said he "kept thinking 'It's not good enough. It's not good enough.'" Reiss added that "we were definitely scared. We had never run anything before, and they dumped us on this."

Jean and Reiss served as showrunners until the end of the fourth season in 1993. Since the show had already established itself in the first two seasons, they were able to give it more depth during their tenure. Jean believes this is one of the reasons that many fans and critics regard season three and four as the best seasons of The Simpsons. Bill Oakley, another Simpsons writer, has commented that "Mike and Al are responsible for the best thing that ever appeared on television, which was the third season of The Simpsons." Comedy writer Jay Kogen has said that "those years with Al Jean and Mike Reiss running it were pretty darn good. And then the ones after that maybe not so much. Some people ran it better than others."

=== The Critic and Disney ===
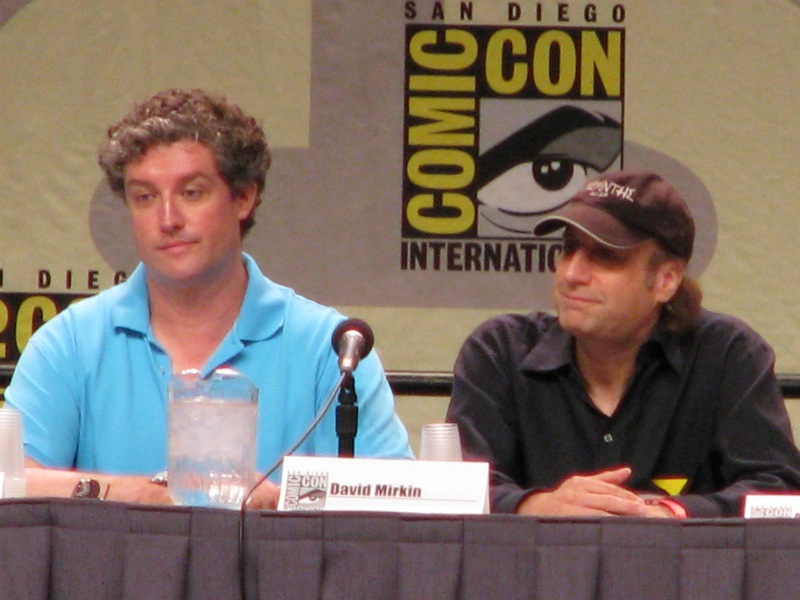
Jean and former Simpsons executive producer David Mirkin at the 2007 Comic Con.

Jean and Reiss left The Simpsons after its fourth season in order to create The Critic, an animated show about film critic Jay Sherman (voiced by Jon Lovitz); the show was executive produced by Brooks. It was first broadcast on ABC in January 1994 and was well received by critics, but did not catch on with viewers and was put on hiatus after six weeks. It returned in June 1994 and completed airing its initial production run. The Critic was moved to the Fox network for its second season. Since The Simpsons also aired on that network, Brooks was able to create a crossover between it and The Critic.

Said crossover occurred through the Simpsons episode "A Star Is Burns" (1995). Groening was not fond of the crossover, publicly citing it as a thirty-minute advertisement for The Critic. Brooks said, "for years, Al and Mike were two guys who worked their hearts out on this show, staying up until 4 in the morning to get it right. The point is, Matt's name has been on Mike's and Al's scripts and he has taken plenty of credit for a lot of their great work. In fact, he is the direct beneficiary of their work. The Critic is their shot and he should be giving them his support." Reiss stated that he was a "little upset" by Groening's actions and that "this taints everything at the last minute. [...] This episode doesn't say 'Watch The Critic' all over it." Jean added "What bothers me about all of this, is that now people may get the impression that this Simpsons episode is less than good. It stands on its own even if The Critic never existed." On Fox, The Critic was again short-lived, broadcasting ten episodes before its cancellation. A total of only 23 episodes were produced, and it returned briefly in 2000 with a series of ten Internet broadcast webisodes. The series has since developed a cult following thanks to reruns on Comedy Central and its complete series release on DVD.

In 1994, Jean and Reiss signed a three-year deal with The Walt Disney Company to produce other television shows for ABC. The duo created and executive produced Teen Angel, which was canceled in its first season. Reiss said "It was so compromised and overworked. I had 11 executives full-time telling me how to do my job." The pair periodically returned to work on The Simpsons— for example, while under contract at Disney they were allowed to write and produce four episodes of the show, including season eight's "Simpsoncalifragilisticexpiala(Annoyed Grunt)cious" (1997).

=== Further work on The Simpsons ===
"What has defined the Al Jean era is the show's definitive move into the mainstream of American TV and culture. By now The Simpsons is the most successful show in the history of television—it's a long way from the young, mouthy, experimental series on the upstart network [Fox]. With the show's popularity such a shift was inevitable, and for many reasons it's unfair to compare today's episodes with those from the show's heyday."

— John Ortved in The Simpsons: An Uncensored, Unauthorized History

Following Teen Angel's cancellation, Jean and Reiss ceased their writing partnership. Subsequently, Jean alone returned full-time to The Simpsons during the tenth season (1998–99) and became a prominent writer and executive producer during the ensuing three seasons, all produced under Mike Scully's supervision. Following Scully's departure in 2001, Jean returned to the showrunner position with the start of the thirteenth season (2001–2002), likewise without Reiss. Jean called it "a great job with a lot of responsibility," and cited "the fact that people love it so much" as "great." He adds, however, that "the hardest thing at this point is just thinking of fresh ideas. People are so on top of things that we've done before, so the challenge now is to think of an idea that's good, but hasn't been seen." Jean's return was initially welcomed, with MSNBC's Jon Bonné stating: "Jean, who took the show's helm from executive producer Mike Scully in 2001, has guided the show away from its gag-heavy, Homer-centric incarnation...these are certainly brighter days for the show's long-time fans." However, some critics have argued that the show's quality has continued to decline in recent years during Jean's tenure. Jean has responded to this criticism by saying: "Well, it's possible that we've declined. But honestly, I've been here the whole time and I do remember in season two people saying, 'It's gone downhill.' If we'd listened to that then we would have stopped after episode 13. I'm glad we didn't."

Jean was one of the writers and producers who worked on The Simpsons Movie, a feature-length film released in 2007. The show's voice cast was signed on to do the film in 2001, and work then began on the script. The Simpsons producers were initially worried that creating a film would have a negative effect on the show, as they did not have enough crew to focus their attention on both projects. As the show progressed, additional writers and animators were hired so that both the show and the film could be produced at the same time. Groening and Brooks were therefore able to invite Jean (who continued to work as show runner on the television show) to produce the film with them.

Jean frequently appears on the Simpsons DVD audio commentaries for episodes which he has collaborated on. He told IGN that he enjoys doing them because he has not seen some of the episodes in ten to fifteen years, and "it's kind of like a reunion to see some of the people that I worked with before, so it's a really pleasant experience."

From 2020 to 2025, he was joint showrunner with Matt Selman, running four to six episodes per season himself beginning with season thirty-three. Jean has also co-written and produced a number of Simpsons shorts, including: The Longest Daycare, nominated for the Academy Award for Best Animated Short Film; The Force Awakens from Its Nap and When Billie Met Lisa, which were both nominated for the Primetime Emmy Award for Outstanding Short Form Animated Program; and The Simpsons | Balenciaga, which won the 2022 Clio Award for Film - Scripted.

In November 2025, Jean announced that he would step down as showrunner of the show after serving for nearly 25 years in the role. The last episode where he served as showrunner was the episode "Bad Boys... for Life?", which was written by him. Selman took over the full showrunning duties afterwards, while Jean remains on the show as a writer and consulting producer.

== Awards ==
Jean has received ten Emmy Awards and two Peabody Awards for his work on The Simpsons. In 1997, he and Reiss won an Annie Award in the "Best Producing in a TV Production" category for the Simpsons episode "The Springfield Files". In 1991 they shared the Writing A Comedy Series CableAce Award for the It's Garry Shandling's Show Episode "My Mother The Wife". In 2006, the duo was given the Animation Writers Caucus Animation Award which is given by the Writers Guild of America to writers that "advanced the literature of animation in film and/or television through the years and who has made outstanding contributions to the profession of the animation writer."

== Personal life ==
As of 2005, Jean lives in Los Angeles, California, with his wife, television writer Stephanie Gillis. Jean also has two daughters.
