= Doris Grau =

American actress (1924-1995)

- Born: October 12, 1924; Brooklyn, New York, U.S.
- Died: December 30, 1995 (aged 71); Los Angeles, California, U.S.
- Occupations: Actress; script supervisor

Doris Grau (October 12, 1924 – December 30, 1995) was an American actress and script supervisor from Brooklyn. After moving to Hollywood in 1940, she began her career supervising film and television scripts. She continued to do this until the 1990s and worked on films such as Point Blank and King Kong and television shows such as Cheers and The Tracey Ullman Show. Grau did some acting in her later years, playing live-action and animated roles. On the sitcom The Simpsons, she worked as a script supervisor and provided the voice of Lunchlady Doris and other minor characters.

== Early life ==
Grau was born on October 12, 1924, in Brooklyn, New York. She moved to the Hollywood district in Los Angeles, California, as a teenager in 1940. There she was soon hired as a script supervisor for the production company Columbia Pictures.

== Career ==
Grau supervised the script of the 1967 crime film Point Blank, which revolves around a man named Walker (played by Lee Marvin) who sets out to find his friend who betrayed him during a robbery that they performed together and left with all the money for himself. Grau was also the script supervisor of the 1976 remake of King Kong. She then supervised the scripts of the films The Champ (1979), The Frisco Kid (1979), The Hunter (1980), The Pursuit of D. B. Cooper (1981), Caveman (1981), Clue (1985), Marie (1985), and No Way Out (1987). In the 1980s, she also supervised scripts of the television show Coward of the County (1982) and the television films The Shadow Riders (1983), Missing Children: A Mother's Story (1983), Kenny Rogers as The Gambler: The Adventure Continues (1984), Velvet (1984), and My Wicked, Wicked Ways: The Legend of Errol Flynn (1985).

In 1986, Grau played a role in the television series All Is Forgiven. Between 1986 and 1987, she played the character Corinne in a few episodes of the sitcom Cheers, a show on which she had previously worked as script supervisor during seasons one and four. Grau worked as a script supervisor on Fox Broadcasting Company's The Tracey Ullman Show (1987–1990), a variety show that featured among many things the first appearance of the fictional animated Simpson family. This family was later given their own animated series on Fox, called The Simpsons, in 1989. Grau worked on that show as a script supervisor as well. Grau also voiced some characters in The Simpsons. She is best known for lending her voice to Lunchlady Doris, who speaks with a "gruff voice" according to The Journal Gazette editor Dean Robinson. This character appeared on the show with Grau's voice between 1991 and 1997. Grau also worked as an actress on the animated series The Critic that was created by writers of The Simpsons in 1994. She voiced the chain-smoking character Doris Grossman, who is the make-up artist for the main character of the show.

In 1992, Grau appeared in the supporting role of Hattie Rifkin in the film The Distinguished Gentleman. According to Philip Wuntch, film critic for The Dallas Morning News, Grau "has only a few lines as a senior citizen with old-time political savvy, but she makes every vocal inflection count." The Patriot-News's Sharon Johnson called her "a delight as the feisty senior citizens' lobbyist who first recognizes Johnson as a winner."

Grau worked as a script supervisor on the sitcom Good Advice in 1993, and played characters in the sitcoms Phenom and The George Carlin Show in 1994. One of her last film appearances was a minor role in the 1995 film Babe, which is about a pig who wants to be a sheepdog. She also appeared as the character Rose in the 1995 film Coldblooded that tells the story of a member of the Mob who is promoted to hitman against his will.

== Death ==
On December 30, 1995, aged 71, Grau died from respiratory failure at a hospital in Hollywood. "Team Homer", an episode of the seventh season of The Simpsons that aired on January 7, 1996, was dedicated to her memory. Because some episodes of The Simpsons are produced long before they air, Grau's last appearance on the show was in the season 9 episode "Lisa's Sax" (an episode originally produced for season 7) that aired on October 19, 1997. Her character, Lunchlady Doris on The Simpsons was retired out of respect (similar to the retirement of Phil Hartman's characters). However, the character returned to the show after a decade-long absence in 2006 (voiced by Tress MacNeille and renamed Lunchlady Dora.)

== Filmography ==
=== Film ===
| Year | Title | Role | Notes |
|---|---|---|---|
| 1992 | The Distinguished Gentleman | Hattie Rifkin | |
| 1995 | Coldblooded | Rose | |
| 1995 | Babe | Country Woman (voice) | Final role |

=== Television ===
| Year | Title | Role | Notes |
|---|---|---|---|
| 1986-1987 | Cheers | Corinne | 3 episodes |
| 1988-1990 | DuckTales | Additional Voices (voice) | 15 episodes |
| 1991-1997 | The Simpsons | Lunchlady Doris, Various (voice) | 22 episodes |
| 1994 | The George Carlin Show | Mom | Episode: "George Loses His Thermos" |
| 1994-1995 | The Critic | Doris Grossman (voice) | 23 episodes |
| 1994 | Phenom | Mrs. Mackie | Episode: "It's a Wonderful Mid-Life Crisis" |
| 1994 | Monty | Elsa | Episode: "Eggheads" |
