= The Critic (TV series) =

American adult animated sitcom

- Genre: Animated sitcom Parody; Satire
- Created by: Al Jean; Mike Reiss
- Voices of: Jon Lovitz; Nancy Cartwright; Christine Cavanaugh; Gerrit Graham; Doris Grau; Judith Ivey; Nick Jameson; Maurice LaMarche; Charles Napier; Park Overall; Tress MacNeille; Kath Soucie; Russi Taylor
- Theme music composer: Hans Zimmer
- Composer: Alf Clausen
- Country of origin: United States
- Original language: English
- No. of seasons: 2 (+ 10 shorts)
- No. of episodes: 23 (+ 10 shorts) (list of episodes)

Production
- Executive producers: Al Jean; Mike Reiss; James L. Brooks
- Producers: Rich Moore; Richard Raynis; Richard Sakai; J. Michael Mendel
- Running time: 22 minutes (1994–1995); 2–4 minutes (2000–2001)
- Production companies: Film Roman (Note: Animation only); Gracie Films; Columbia Pictures Television (TV series); Sony Pictures Digital Entertainment (shorts)

Original release
- Network: ABC
- Release: January 26 – July 20, 1994
- Network: Fox
- Release: March 5 – May 21, 1995
- Network: AtomFilms; Shockwave.com
- Release: December 12, 2000 – September 17, 2001

The Critic is an American adult animated sitcom revolving around the life of New York film critic Jay Sherman, voiced by Jon Lovitz. It was created by writing partners Al Jean and Mike Reiss, who had previously worked as writers and showrunners on the third and fourth seasons of The Simpsons. The series was animated by Film Roman and 23 episodes of The Critic were produced. The show was first broadcast on ABC in 1994 and finished its original run on Fox in 1995.

Episodes featured film parodies with notable examples including a musical version of Apocalypse Now; Howard Stern's End (Howards End); Honey, I Ate the Kids (Honey, I Shrunk the Kids/The Silence of the Lambs); The Cockroach King (The Lion King); Abe Lincoln: Pet Detective (Ace Ventura: Pet Detective); and Scent of a Jackass and Scent of a Wolfman (Scent of a Woman). The show often referenced popular films, such as Willy Wonka & the Chocolate Factory and The Godfather, and routinely lampooned Marlon Brando, Orson Welles, Woody Allen, and Dudley Moore, usually as his character Arthur Bach from the 1981 film Arthur.

Despite the ratings improving, The Critic was cancelled after two seasons. (Note: Although the series wasn't renewed, most of the Fox episodes reran until July 30, 1995, where it was replaced by Living Single reruns) It continued to air through reruns on Comedy Central and then on Locomotion. From February 1, 2000 to 2001, ten webisodes were produced using Macromedia Shockwave; these webisodes were broadcast on AtomFilms.com and Shockwave.com.

In the late 2000s, reruns of the show aired again on ReelzChannel in the US and on Teletoon's programming block Teletoon at Night in Canada.

== Premise ==
The show follows the life of a 36-year-old film critic from New York named Jay Sherman. His televised review show, Coming Attractions, airs on the Philips Broadcasting cable network. Sherman is cold, mean-spirited, and elitist as a movie critic, but in his everyday life he has a gentler nature and is filled with self-doubt. His signature line, upon seeing a terrible film, is "It stinks!" Each episode is full of film references and parodies. Some of the secondary characters that are a part of Jay's story include his zany adoptive parents and their biological daughter Margo, his well-meaning son Marty, the Australian film star Jeremy Hawke, his snide make-up lady Doris, his ex-wife Ardeth, and his boss Duke Phillips. In the second season, Jay acquires a love interest: a Southern woman named Alice Tompkins, who later becomes his long-term girlfriend.

== Cast and characters ==
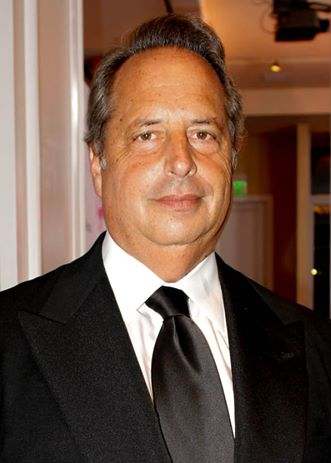
Jon Lovitz voiced Jay Sherman

- Jon Lovitz as Jay Sherman, various characters
- Christine Cavanaugh as Marty Sherman
- Nancy Cartwright as Margo Sherman, various characters
- Gerrit Graham as Franklin Sherman
- Judith Ivey as Eleanor (née Wigglesworth) Sherman
- Doris Grau as Doris Grossman
- Maurice LaMarche as Jeremy Hawke, Shackleford, Principal Mangosuthu, Arnold Schwarzenegger, Orson Welles, Howard Stern, various characters
- Nick Jameson as Vlada Veramirovich, various characters
- Brenda Vaccaro and Rhea Perlman as Ardeth
- Charles Napier as Duke Phillips
- Park Overall as Alice Tompkins
- Russi Taylor as Penny Tompkins
- Kath Soucie as various characters
- Tress MacNeille as Humphrey the Hippo, various characters
- Valerie Levitt as Jennifer (webisodes only)

== Episodes ==
Season	Episodes	Originally released			Rank
Season	Episodes	First released	Last released	Network	Rank
1	13	January 26, 1994	July 20, 1994	ABC	#76, 8.6 rating
2	10	March 5, 1995	May 21, 1995	Fox	#106, 7.5 rating
Webisodes	10	December 12, 2000	September 17, 2001 (ekd)	AtomFilms and Shockwave	TBA

== Production ==
Al Jean	Mike Reiss

The show was created by Al Jean and Mike Reiss, who, along with James L. Brooks, served as executive producers. The Critic was a joint production of Gracie Films, the same company behind 20th Century Fox Television cartoon The Simpsons, in association with Columbia Pictures Television. The show's animation was done by Film Roman, who were also still working on The Simpsons at this time. It was co-produced by Patric Verrone.

Jean and Reiss were showrunners on The Simpsons and had been approached by series creator Matt Groening to design a spin-off centered on Krusty the Clown. Their pitch featured many similarities to The Critic – Krusty would be a single father in New York with a prickly make-up lady and an eccentric boss resembling Ted Turner. Groening turned down the idea, instead wanting the Krusty spin-off to be a live-action series led by the character's animated voice, Dan Castellaneta.

In 1993, Brooks approached Jean and Reiss with the idea of a sitcom based on a morning television program. The pair adapted their Krusty pitch to the new idea. Brooks recommended Jon Lovitz as the lead, based on his performance in A League of Their Own. Lovitz initially turned down the role due to his commitments with three upcoming films, so, at the last moment, the series became animated.

The show sometimes included appearances of real-life critics, such as Gene Shallit, Rex Reed, Gene Siskel, and Roger Ebert, who provided their own voices. When choosing things to parody, Reiss and Jean made a conscious decision to find the right balance between current pop culture and references that would stand the test of time.

=== Broadcast ===
The Critic was "the first major non-family sitcom animated program to appear in primetime." The show started out on ABC on January 26, 1994, where it aired 13 episodes. It was cancelled by the network after half a season and was then moved onto Fox the following year, where it ran for another ten-episode season. Around this time, in an attempt to popularize the show, it was included in a "shameless plug" crossover with The Simpsons (in their episode "A Star Is Burns") and was scheduled in the timeslot immediately after The Simpsons. But despite improvement of the ratings, Fox moved it to a different timeslot after five episodes and also cancelled it after this run had finished airing in May 1995. According to The TV IV, nine scripts were already written for the planned third season, and the show was going to be moved to UPN, but an agreement was not reached. Fox refused to officially cancel the show until much later. The show was not renewed on any network and effectively became cancelled. The show returned in Flash-animated webisode form in 2000–2001, for a third season, with 10 three- to five-minute installments. In Spain, it aired on Canal+ in the 1990s and on Cartoon Network from 2000 to 2001 through a nightly block aimed at adults, vaguely as a pre-beta to Adult Swim, both times alongside Duckman.

=== Design ===
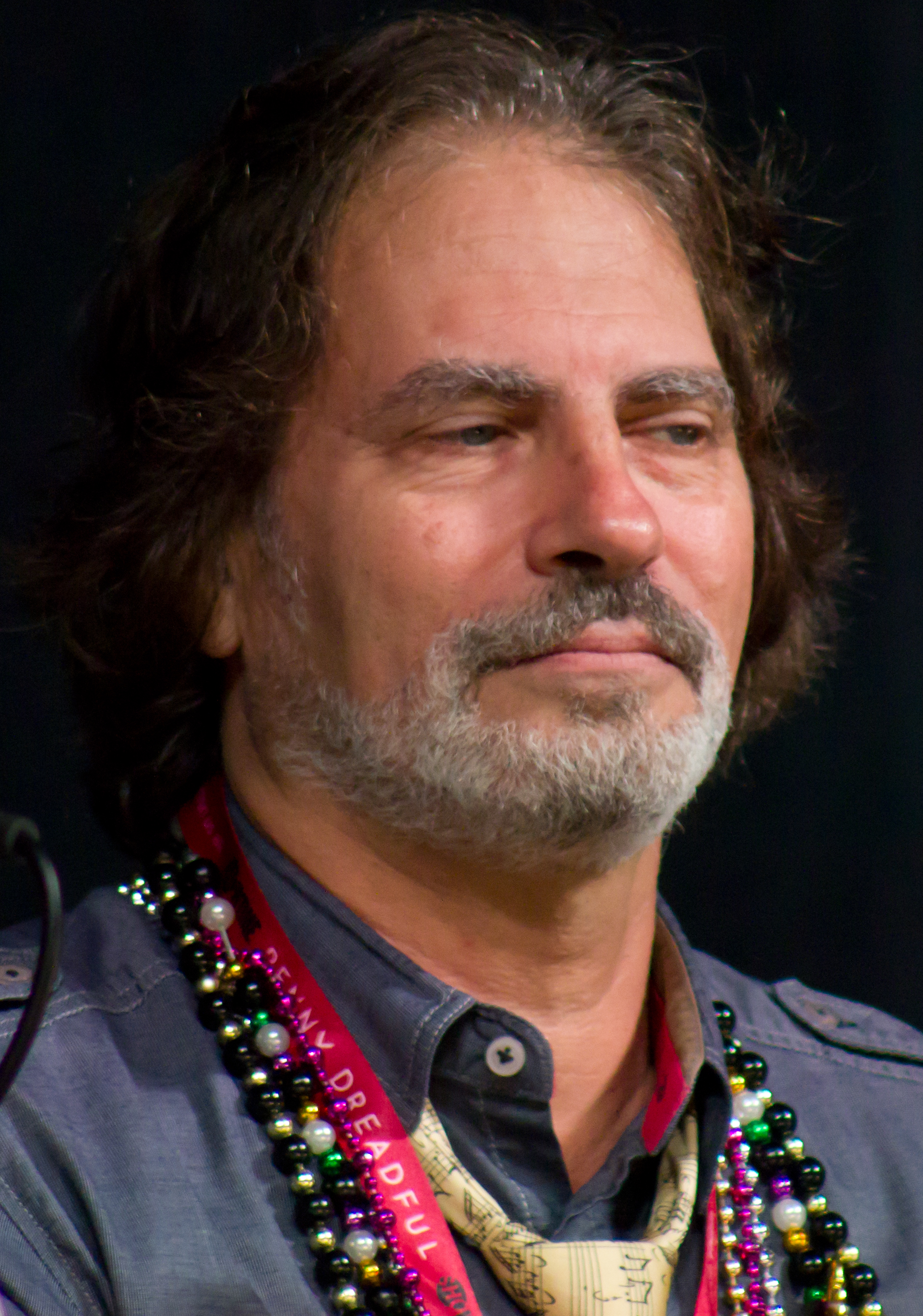
David Silverman designed Jay Sherman

Four people have a design credit on the show: David Silverman, Rich Moore, David Cutler, and Everett Peck. Silverman designed the look of Jay Sherman. Moore and Cutler designed the general look of the show including some of the backgrounds and supporting cast. The character of Doris was based on Peck's drawings. Cutler helped standardize all these designers' styles. Moore was the supervising director and thus oversaw a lot of the design process; he was also responsible for how the action would play out and how each shot would be framed. Rich Moore explains "the design of Jay Sherman began as a sketch done by David Silverman" on a napkin/place-mat in a restaurant. He was designed as "Kaufmanesque", and Jim Brooks liked the design, so his design remained much the same for the pilot episode. Moore had his reservations as the character had a "flat head and tiny eyes that were hard to act with" and was composed of shapes that were difficult to turn in a 3D space. It was decided, however, that the drawing encapsulated the humanity and reality of the character, so it was left unchanged. Nonetheless, over the course of the two seasons, the design was altered slightly. The flat head was made more round, and his eyes became bigger, to make Sherman more appealing and easier to animate. The design team never intended to make the characters too cartoony as it would not have fit tonally with the type of show. The characters were designed via a general think-tank process of "what do we like about the characters and what are we trying to say about them?". Quick sketches were completed in front of the full creative team, after a discussion about characters, which were then critically analysed. In particular, the design of the parents caused some issues. Jim Brooks described the father as a "crazy wasp." The designs were eventually based on a photo of a professor and his wife. Moore explains that the animation should never "step on the voices or the writing."

Vlada, an Eastern European restaurateur, was named after Jean and Reiss's film professor at Harvard University, Vlada Petrić. The character's physical appearance was based on Gábor Csupó, a Hungarian animator on the early seasons of The Simpsons. Though some believed Sherman to look like the film critic James Wolcott, this was not intentional.

=== Casting ===
Script supervisor Doris Grau, who had played Lunchlady Doris on The Simpsons, was cast as Sherman's make-up lady, Doris. Four actresses, including Margaret Cho, were hired and dismissed as the voice of Sherman's younger sister Margo. The role eventually went to the voice of Bart Simpson, Nancy Cartwright, who was pleased to finally be voicing a female. Duke Phillips, Jay's Ted Turner-esque boss, was played by Charles Napier, using his real voice. Due to the sheer number of film and TV parodies, the team also sought character actors who could play many different roles. During the audition process, they asked them to perform their acts, which Reiss described as "very entertaining." Maurice LaMarche impressed Jean by doing "perfect" impressions. LaMarche even beat out genuine Australians for the role of Australian actor Jeremy Hawke. He was often asked to work on his accent of a pop culture figure related to media just released or that would have been released by the time of the episode's airing. Depending on who could do the voice better, the characters were divided up between Nick Jameson and LaMarche. Each would play about 20–30 characters per show. According to LaMarche, he played twenty-seven characters in one episode. He specialized in impressions, while Jameson's specialty was accents and dialects.

== Relationship with The Simpsons ==
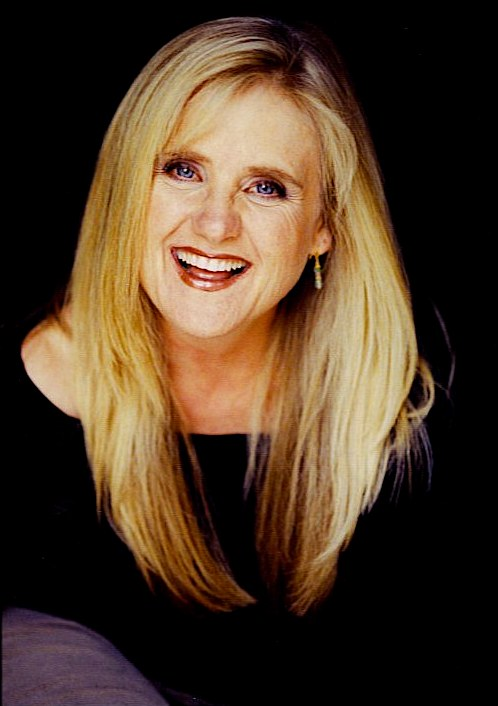
Nancy Cartwright was a member of the cast on The Simpsons and The Critic

Nathan Rabin of The A.V. Club explains "in creating The Critic, Al Jean and Mike Reiss set out to make the show as dissimilar from The Simpsons as humanly possible". Nevertheless, there are many similarities between the two series. Gen X TV: The Brady Bunch to Melrose Place argues that The Critic became a critical success while other animated shows of the early 1990s flopped was because "the makers of these shows failed to realize that The Simpsons didn't become a hit because of animation [but] because of its style of humor", and says that The Critic understood this. It adds the show "took the media-obsession/parody portions of The Simpsons and created a separate show around them". Planet Simpson describes the show as "the closest thing The Simpsons ever had to a spin-off." The Critic also shares The Simpsons' love for criticizing Fox and the audience, such as Jay's frequent line "You're watching Fox, shame on you" and "The Critic will be right back, you TV-addicted couch monkeys" before the show went to commercial break. Rabin said "The Critic made its protagonist the anti-Homer Simpson. Where Homer is a booze-sodden everyman, Jay Sherman is an unabashed elitist. Where Homer is a rudely physical creature, Jay leads a life of the mind. Homer is a slob. Jay is a snob." While "Springfield is very aggressively and deliberately Anywhere, United States, The Critic is an extended Valentine to a certain kind of pointy-headed East Coast elitism." PopMatters said "The Critic's humor is very much in the spirit of The Simpsons, taken in a more brazenly surreal direction."

Matt Groening had no part in its inception, and wanted to make this very clear, so he would not be associated with any success or failure the show would have. He claimed that in the public consciousness, this was his show—a direct spin-off to The Simpsons.

Many voice actors appear in both The Simpsons and The Critic, and regulars on both shows have made cameos in the others. For example, Nancy Cartwright, Doris Grau, Tress MacNeille, Russi Taylor, and Jon Lovitz have all played primary/secondary characters on both shows. Maurice LaMarche, who played many characters on The Critic, "played George C. Scott getting hit in the groin with a football" in the crossover episode. His only line was "Ow, my groin." He also did Jay's belch in the episode.

=== Crossovers ===
In "Dukerella", Jay and Alice attend a costume ball dressed as Homer and Marge. Homer and Bart Simpson made a brief appearance in "Dial M for Mother". During an interview with Geraldo Rivera, Jay is asked about talking over the heads of his audience and does just that in his answer. An annoyed family watching changes the channel to The Simpsons, where Homer—after stepping on a rake—exclaims, "D'oh!" and Bart replies, "¡Ay caramba!" The family's father comments, "Now, this I understand."

Jay makes a guest appearance on The Simpsons in "A Star Is Burns" presiding over a local film festival. When Jay enters the Simpson household, Bart is watching a Flintstones-Jetsons crossover show, which he criticizes; he then praises Jay and Coming Attractions/The Critic, before shuddering and saying to himself "I feel so dirty." At the end of the episode, as he is leaving for New York, Jay offers the Simpsons an appearance on Coming Attractions/The Critic, but Bart declines, saying, "Nah, we're not going to be doing that." Jay has yellow skin when he appears on The Simpsons but pink skin on The Critic. This episode caused some conflict between Simpsons creator Matt Groening and executive producer James L. Brooks. Groening decided to take his name off the credits and did not appear in the DVD commentary. He publicly complained about the episode, which went to air in the end. He said "for more than six months I tried to convince Jim Brooks and everyone connected with the show not to do such a cynical thing, which would surely be perceived by the fans as nothing more than a pathetic attempt to...advertise The Critic at the expense of the integrity of The Simpsons." In response, Brooks said "[Groening] is a gifted, adorable, cuddly ingrate. But his behavior right now is rotten. And, it's not pretty when a rich man acts like this."

Jay appeared briefly on The Simpsons a few more times. In the episode "Hurricane Neddy", he was in a mental hospital, apparently unable to say anything more than his catchphrase ("It stinks! It stinks! It stinks!") In the episode "The Ziff Who Came to Dinner", he is seen at Moe's Tavern with all the other characters on the show that Lovitz voices or has voiced.

== Hallmarks ==
Much like the opening sequence in The Simpsons with its chalkboard, sax solo, and couch gags, The Critic has a distinctive opening sequence featuring minor gags. Jay is always awakened by a disquieting phone call or radio news report, and eventually watches a clip that parodies a well-known film before delivering the same negative opinion: "It stinks!" He watches the closing credits in a theater and delivers one of four comeback lines (five, once the character of Alice Tompkins was added in the second season) to an usher who tells him the show is over.

== Themes ==
One of the main elements featured on The Critic is the lampooning of the entertainment industry. The A.V. Club mentioned that Jean and Reiss's The Simpsons episodes have a high number of parodies, spoofs and homages from the characters watching television and films: "They didn't need any such excuse for film parodies on The Critic since Jay's life was inherently and organically filled with film. It proved the perfect delivery system for an endless series of clever, bite-sized spoofs." The book I'm an English Major—Now What? epitomises this by recounting a scene where Jay is forced to rate films "on a scale of good to excellent"—thereby negating his credibility as a film critic. Sherman says "but what if I won't like something," to which his boss Duke replies, "That's what good is for." This shows the corruption of an industry that aims to provide unbiased thoughtful analyses of films, due to bribery and politics. Another example is in the June 22 episode "L.A. Jay," where after trying to break into the film business by writing a script, which is revealed to be rather good, a studio buys it off him for $100,000 in order to bury it, thereby keeping quality out of the industry. While episodes typically dealt with his private life, Jay's position as a film critic "offer[ed] numerous opportunities for the show to satirize the film industry, establishing a dialogue with popular culture" in a very similar way to what The Simpsons had been doing for years.

The Critic often made fun of celebrities and also frequently comments on television. For example, one episode satirizes Duke's project involving making the films "more attractive to a contemporary audience" by "inserting computer-generated happy endings" (ex: Casablanca's Rick Blaine gets his girl while the restored version of Stanley Kubrick's "deadwood" Spartacus combined with a chase scene spoofing Smokey and the Bandit). The article "Ten Frighteningly Prophetic Parodies from The Critic" claimed that some of the show's spoofs "have come true (or close to true), proving that there really isn't anything that's too stupid for Hollywood to make".

GrabBagCinema said the show would appeal to cinema fans "because it really understood movies, celebrities, Hollywood and humour...[you would understand] the references and [see] the effort the writers and animators put in, to recapture the movies you grew up loving and remembering... but they did it with clever humour that wouldn't offend you." The same review praised how unlike many modern critics, Sherman was honest with how much he disliked certain films.

== Reception and legacy ==
=== Contemporaneous ===
The Critic received mixed to positive reviews when it first aired. In 1994, The Chicago Sun-Times gave a typical review of the show with, "Jay Sherman, the eponymous culture vulture of The Critic, would undoubtedly say his new animated comedy on ABC 'stinks.' Fortunately for him [The Critic] smells pretty good to me." The show has since developed a cult following, with much of it coming through the show's weekend reruns on Comedy Central up until about 2005.

The DVD set also got many positive reviews, such as one from Animated Views which gave it an overall rating of 10/10. Mike Reiss's favourite episode is the Siskel and Ebert one.

In September 2006, IGN ranked The Critic ninth on its list of the Top 25 Primetime Animated Series of All Time. In January 2009, they ranked the show 26th in their other list of the Top 100 Best Animated TV Series. In the latter article, IGN said: "Of all the projects completed by ex-Saturday Night Live players, The Critic is the most fully realized, hilarious and heartwarming. It took its cues from Woody Allen movies like Annie Hall and Manhattan, and offered up a style of random abstract humor that wouldn't really be seen again until Family Guy." In December 2011, Complex ranked the show 6th in their list of The 25 Most Underrated Animated TV Shows Of All Time.

People magazine gave it a B, saying "This animated series is slyly amusing when sticking it to showbiz, taking sarcastic swipes at everyone from Steven Seagal to Gene Shalit. At its best, it's still several strides behind the savage, protean wit of The Simpsons, and the humor sputters when the focus is personal." Of the third season, IGN said "I was thrilled to find out that Gracie Films has started producing new episodes of the cancelled ABC/Fox/Comedy Central show The Critic—and for web cartoons that don't depend on the violence/swear cop-out for the humor, the shows are actually really well produced."

Early on in its run, Siskel and Ebert did a review of the show. It was the only television series they ever reviewed. Some of the criticisms they provided, if left unattended to, may have been factors to the show's cancellation. They said the show did not have as many memorable characters as The Simpsons, and encouraged the writers to work on that. They said the second episode was a let down because "it didn't seem to be about the world of a movie critic," and was instead about "a single dad and his geeky son." They said the jokes involving Jay's dad get tiresome, and that the station boss isn't as sharp a parody as he could be. Gene Siskel said, "if The Critic is gonna succeed—and I hope it does—it desperately needs to refocus itself on the movies and the way critics interact with them." He added that the show needs a second critic, and jokingly said he and Roger Ebert should (and would love to) save the show by writing scripts for them. Ebert said the show should have 2 to 3 movie/genre parodies per episode. He added he would like to see Jay watch television to allow the show to satirize that medium as well. This would focus the show on the media, and not let it become another show about a man and his problems. Siskel said the writers should keep Jay as a smart critic. Regardless of his personality, if his critiques are witty and intelligent, by extension the show's satire becomes much sharper. The two critics later appeared as themselves in an episode where they ended their partnership and each recruited Jay to join them for a new series; when Jay realized that Gene and Roger deeply missed working together, he engineered their reconciliation and went back to his own series.

=== Later analysis ===
AOL TV published an article in 2009 entitled Gone Too Soon: The Critic, in which they analyzed the cancellation of the show. It said "The creators and Lovitz seem to [care about the show], as there are always talks cropping up of a revival of The Critic, either as an animated project, or possibly a live-action one. There are fan sites out there, but as time passes with no new material, many of these are becoming floating time capsules". Plus, a lot of effort was put into the release of the DVD (for which there was a lot of demand), meaning there is still a fan base as well as a passionate cast and crew.

Drawn to Television says that like Jay's show-within-a-show Coming Attractions, "audiences never quite warmed up to Sherman and his surrounding cast of characters" in The Critic, perhaps due to the lack of warmth between character interactions in both shows. He also criticized the sometimes rather mean-spirited ways the fat jokes were directed at Marlon Brando or Orson Welles. The book The Magic Behind the Voices put its cancellation down to "so-so ratings and network politics." Planet Simpson says it "failed to click with Simpsons fans." In 1994, Austin American-Statesman said "The Critic never had a prayer on ABC, where the comedy overload consists of domestic sitcoms". The show is generally considered one of the great TV shows cancelled too early into its run. The Columbia Spectator said the show was "one of television's great lost causes." Voice actor Maurice LaMarche considered The Critic one of his "personal favorites," saying "I would almost give anything to bring back The Critic, along with Pinky and the Brain; those are the two most satisfying jobs I've ever had." Ogeeku said "This show did not last as long as it should have and that is truly a shame. The Critic was in its time, one of the greatest animated shows ever made and one of the funniest shows period on television." Reiss thinks the show holds up very well.

PopMatters considered Sherman a perfect role for Lovitz, due to his strengths of "sarcasm and ironic overacting," but believed that there were too many jokes about the character's obesity, and these were too similar to and inferior to such jokes about Homer Simpson. The same review called the show "outlandish in a way that The Simpsons would not adopt until later", and likened its cutaway humor to Family Guy. However, it considered the cutaways on The Critic to be better than those of Family Guy, due to Family Guy's greater reliance on shock value.

=== Awards and nominations ===
Year	Nominee / work	Award	Result
1994	Gracie Films and Film Roman Productions	Annie Award for Best Animated Television Program	Nominated
1995	Al Jean and Mike Reiss	Annie Award for Best Individual Achievement for Creative Supervision in the Field of Animation	Nominated

== Streaming and home media ==
Responding to the successful DVD sales of Family Guy and The Simpsons, Columbia TriStar Home Entertainment decided to release The Critic: The Complete Series DVD box set on January 27, 2004, which includes all 2 seasons and 23 TV episodes (in their original production order) and the webisodes. The show achieved good sales, jumping onto the DVD list at 14 on Amazon, and quickly going through five issuings.

On June 8, 2021, Mill Creek Entertainment re-released The Critic: The Complete Series on DVD in Region 1.

The series was previously available on Crackle but is no longer available there. It is currently available on Tubi.

== Possible revival ==
On March 28, 2025, Jon Lovitz posted on Twitter about reviving the show by stating, “You keep telling me you want it back. I've been trying for years! Well, now, creator Al Jean is on board!!! If you want it back, we need your help! Please like this post and spread the word! So we can show the studio, how many people want it!”.

The original showrunners, Al Jean and Mike Reiss, also said that a deal for a revival was nearing closure in June 2026. Jean said that there was still working out deals with Lovitz, but believed it likely would work out.

== Sources ==
- Reiss, Mike (2018), Springfield Confidential, Dey Street, ISBN 978-0-06-274803-4
