= Annie Award for Outstanding Achievement for Directing in an Animated Television/Broadcast Production =

Annual animation award

Annie Award for Directing in an Animated Television/Broadcast Production
- Awarded for: Excellence in directing for animated television/broadcast productions
- Country: United States
- Presented by: ASIFA-Hollywood
- First award: 1997
- Currently held by: Vincent Tsui – Common Side Effects (2025)
- Website: annieawards.org

The Annie Award for Directing in an Animated Television/Broadcast Production is an Annie Award given annually to the best animated direction in animated television or broadcast productions. Directing for television productions was first recognized at the 24th Annie Awards alongside feature film in the Best Achievement in Directing, though the next year a separate category would be created resulting in two directing categories, one for television/broadcasting productions and another for animated feature films.

== Winners and nominees ==
=== 1990s ===
Best Achievement in Directing

Year	Film	Director(s)
1996 (24th)
1996 (24th)	Toy Story	John Lasseter
1996 (24th)	Gargoyles	Frank Paur
1996 (24th)	Ghost in the Shell	Mamoru Oshii
1996 (24th)	The Hunchback of Notre Dame	Gary Trousdale and Kirk Wise
1996 (24th)	James and the Giant Peach	Henry Selick

Best Individual Achievement for Directing in a TV Production

Year	Program	Episode(s)	Director(s)	Network
1997 (25th)
1997 (25th)	The Simpsons	"Homer's Phobia"	Mike B. Anderson	Fox
1997 (25th)	Animaniacs	"Noel"	Charles Visser	Kids' WB
1997 (25th)	King of the Hill	"Keeping Up with Our Joneses"	John Rice	Fox
1997 (25th)	Timon & Pumbaa	"Beethoven's Whiff", "Bumble in the Jungle", "Mind Over Matterhorn"	Robert Gannaway, Tony Craig	Syndicated
1997 (25th)	Voice B Gone		David Wasson	MTV
1998 (26th)
1998 (26th)	The Simpsons	"Trash of the Titans"	Jim Reardon	Fox
1998 (26th)	Oh Yeah! Cartoons	"Chalkzone"	Jaime Diaz	Nickelodeon
1998 (26th)	The Legend of Calamity Jane	"A Slip of the Whip"	Pascal Morelli	The WB
1998 (26th)	"Big and Little Doors" (BankAtlantic)		Raimund Krumme	Commercial
1998 (26th)	Pinky and the Brain	"Brain Acres"	Nelson Recinos	Kids' WB
1999 (27th)
1999 (27th)	The PJs	"Bougie Nights"	Mark Gustafson	Fox
1999 (27th)	The Powerpuff Girls	"Mommie Fearest"	John McIntyre	Cartoon Network
1999 (27th)	Pinky, Elmyra & the Brain	"How I Spent My Weekend"	Nelson Recinos	Kids' WB
1999 (27th)	Oh Yeah! Cartoons	"Max & His Special Problem"	Dave Wasson	Nickelodeon

=== 2000s ===
Outstanding Achievement for Directing in a Television Production

Year	Program	Episode(s)	Director(s)	Network
2000 (28th)
2000 (28th)	Futurama	"Why Must I Be a Crustacean in Love?"	Brian Sheesley	Fox
2000 (28th)	Johnny Bravo	"Noir Johnny"	Kirk Tingblad	Cartoon Network
2000 (28th)	King of the Hill	"Won't You Pimai Neighbor?"	Boohwan Lim, Kyounghee Lim	Fox
2000 (28th)	Futurama	"A Bicyclops Built for Two"	Susan Dietter	Fox
2001 (29th)
2001 (29th)	Batman Beyond	"The Call, Part One"	Butch Lukic	Kids' WB
2001 (29th)	The Fairly OddParents	"Chin Up"	Butch Hartman	Nickelodeon
2001 (29th)	Invader Zim	"Dark Harvest"	Steve Ressel	Nickelodeon
2001 (29th)	Aaagh! It's the Mr. Hell Show!		Paul Boyd, John "Moose" Pagan	BBC Two
2002 (30th)
2002 (30th)	Futurama	"Roswell That Ends Well"	Rich Moore	Fox
2002 (30th)	Static Shock	"The Big Leagues"	Dave Chlystek	Kids' WB
2002 (30th)	Fillmore!	"To Mar a Stall"	Chris Roman	ABC
2002 (30th)	The Proud Family	"A Hero for Halloween"	Bruce W. Smith	Disney Channel
2002 (30th)	Oh Yeah! Cartoons	"The Boy Who Cried Alien"	Guy Vasilovitch	Nickelodeon
2003 (31st)
2003 (31st)	The Simpsons	"'Scuse Me While I Miss the Sky"	Steven Dean Moore	Fox
2003 (31st)	The Adventures of Jimmy Neutron, Boy Genius	"Operation: Rescue Jet Fusion!"	Mike Gasaway	Nickelodeon
2003 (31st)	My Life as a Teenage Robot	"Ragged Android"	Rob Renzetti	Nickelodeon
2003 (31st)	Samurai Jack	"The Birth of Evil"	Genndy Tartakovsky, Robert Alvarez	Cartoon Network
2003 (31st)	Captain Sturdy: The Originals		Darrell Van Citters	Adult Swim
2004 (32nd)
2004 (32nd)	The Grim Adventures of Billy & Mandy	"Attack of the Clowns"	Shaun Cashman & Phil Cummings	Cartoon Network
2004 (32nd)	The Adventures of Jimmy Neutron, Boy Genius	"Love Potion 976/J"	Keith Alcorn	Nickelodeon
2004 (32nd)	Foster's Home for Imaginary Friends	"Who Let the Dogs In"	Eric Pringle	Cartoon Network
2004 (32nd)	The Grim Adventures of Billy & Mandy	"Nursery Crimes"	Brian Sheesley	Cartoon Network
2004 (32nd)	Samurai Jack	"Tale of X-49"	Genndy Tartakovsky	Cartoon Network
2005 (33rd)
2005 (33rd)	Family Guy	"North by North Quahog"	Peter Shin	Fox
2005 (33rd)	The Fairly OddParents	"The Good Old Days"	Gary Conrad	Nickelodeon
2005 (33rd)	Foster's Home for Imaginary Friends	"Duchess of Wails"	Craig McCracken	Cartoon Network
2005 (33rd)	Justice League Unlimited	"Clash"	Dan Riba	Cartoon Network
2005 (33rd)	Family Guy	"PTV"	Dan Povenmire	Fox
2006 (34th)
2006 (34th)	Avatar: The Last Airbender	"The Drill"	Giancarlo Volpe	Nickelodeon
2006 (34th)	The Grim Adventures of Billy & Mandy	"Hill Billy"	Shaun Cashman	Cartoon Network
2006 (34th)	Foster's Home for Imaginary Friends	"Bus the Two of Us"	Craig McCracken	Cartoon Network
2006 (34th)	Growing Up Creepie	"The Tell-Tale Poem"	Guy Vasilovich	Discovery Kids
2007 (35th)
2007 (35th)	Robot Chicken: Star Wars		Seth Green	Adult Swim
2007 (35th)	My Friends Tigger & Pooh	"Turtles Need for Speed"	David Hartman	Playhouse Disney
2007 (35th)	Squirrel Boy	"Gumfight at the S'Okay Corral"	Raymie Muzquiz	Cartoon Network
2007 (35th)	The Emperor's New School	"Emperor's New Musical"	Howy Perkins	Disney Channel
2007 (35th)	Shrek the Halls		Gary Trousdale	ABC
2008 (36th)
2008 (36th)	Avatar: The Last Airbender	"Sozin's Comet, Part 3: The Inferno"	Joaquim Dos Santos	Nickelodeon
2008 (36th)	The Simpsons	"Treehouse of Horror XIX"	Bob Anderson	Fox
2008 (36th)	Foster's Home for Imaginary Friends	"Destination: Imagination"	Craig McCracken, Rob Renzetti	Cartoon Network
2008 (36th)	Morel Orel	"Passing"	Chris McKay	Adult Swim
2008 (36th)	SpongeBob SquarePants	"Penny Foolish"	Alan Smart	Nickelodeon
2009 (37th)
2009 (37th)	The Penguins of Madagascar	"Launchtime"	Bret Haaland	Nickelodeon
2009 (37th)	American Dad!	"Brains, Brains & Automobiles"	Pam Cooke, Jansen Lee	Fox
2009 (37th)	Popzilla		Rob Fendler	MTV
2009 (37th)	Wonder Pets!	"Help the Monster"	Jennifer Oxley	Nick Jr. Channel
2009 (37th)	The Marvelous Misadventures of Flapjack	"Candy Casanova"	J. G. Quintel, John Infantino	Cartoon Network

=== 2010s ===
Year	Program	Episode(s)	Director(s)	Network
2010 (38th)
2010 (38th)	Kung Fu Panda Holiday		Tim Johnson	NBC
2010 (38th)	The Simpsons	"Treehouse of Horror XXI"	Bob Anderson	Fox
2010 (38th)	Firebreather		Peter Chung	Cartoon Network
2010 (38th)	Mary Shelley's Frankenhole	"Humanitas"	Duke Johnson	Cartoon Network
2010 (38th)	Scared Shrekless		Gary Trousdale	NBC
2011 (39th)
2011 (39th)	The Simpsons		Matthew Nastuk	Fox
2011 (39th)	Dan Vs.		Brian Sheesley	The Hub
2011 (39th)	Kick Buttowski: Suburban Daredevil		Chris Savino, Clayton Morrow	Disney XD
2011 (39th)	Ben 10: Ultimate Alien		Dan Riba	Cartoon Network
2011 (39th)	The Amazing World of Gumball		Mic Graves, Ben Bocquelet	Cartoon Network
2011 (39th)	Ninjago: Masters of Spinjitzu		Peter Hausner	Cartoon Network
2011 (39th)	Community		Duke Johnson	NBC
2011 (39th)	Kung Fu Panda: Legends of Awesomeness		Gabe Swarr	Nickelodeon
2011 (39th)	T.U.F.F. Puppy		Ken Bruce	Nickelodeon
2011 (39th)	The Penguins of Madagascar		Steve Loter, Christo Stamboliev, Shaun Cashman, David Knott	Nickelodeon
2011 (39th)	Prep & Landing: Naughty vs. Nice		Kevin Deters, Stevie Wermers-Skelton	ABC
2011 (39th)	Hoops & Yoyo Ruin Christmas		Tony Craig	CBS
2012 (40th)
2012 (40th)	Dragons: Riders of Berk	"Animal House"	John Eng	Cartoon Network
2012 (40th)	Jake and the Never Land Pirates	"Peter Pan Returns!"	Howy Parkins	Disney Junior/Disney Channel
2012 (40th)	SpongeBob SquarePants	"It's a SpongeBob Christmas!"	Mark Caballero, Seamus Walsh	CBS/Nickelodeon
2012 (40th)	The Amazing World of Gumball	"The Job"	Mic Graves	Cartoon Network
2012 (40th)	Teenage Mutant Ninja Turtles	"Never Say Xever"	Michael Chang	Nickelodeon
2012 (40th)	Dick Figures	"Kung Fu Winners"	Zack Keller, Ed Skudder	YouTube
2013 (41st)
2013 (41st)	Toy Story of Terror!		Angus MacLane	ABC
2013 (41st)	The Legend of Korra		Colin Heck	Nickelodeon
2013 (41st)	Dragons: Defenders of Berk		Elaine Bogan	Cartoon Network
2013 (41st)	The Smurfs: The Legend of Smurfy Hollow		Stephan Franck	Sony Pictures Animation
2013 (41st)	Gravity Falls		John Aoshima	Disney Channel
2013 (41st)	Mickey Mouse		Aaron Springer	Disney Channel
2013 (41st)	Justin Time		Harold Harris	Family Jr.
2014 (42nd)
2014 (42nd)	Mickey Mouse		Aaron Springer	Disney Channel
2014 (42nd)	Adventure Time		Yuasa Masaaki, Eunyoung Choi	Cartoon Network
2014 (42nd)	Over the Garden Wall		Robert Alvarez, Larry Leichliter, Ken Bruce	Cartoon Network
2014 (42nd)	Archer		Bryan Fordney	FX
2014 (42nd)	Gravity Falls		Rob Renzetti	Disney XD
2014 (42nd)	Wander Over Yonder		David Thomas	Disney XD
2014 (42nd)	Bob's Burgers		Jennifer Coyle, Bernard Derriman	Fox
2014 (42nd)	The Simpsons		Matthew Nastuk	Fox
2015 (43rd)
2015 (43rd)	Gravity Falls	"Northwest Mansion Mystery"	Matt Braly	Disney XD
2015 (43rd)	Archer	"Edie's Wedding"	Bryan Fordney	FX
2015 (43rd)	Mickey Mouse	"Coned"	Dave Wasson	Disney Channel
2015 (43rd)	Mickey Mouse	"Bottle Shocked"	Heiko Drengenberg	Disney Channel
2015 (43rd)	Dragons: Race to the Edge	"Reign of Fireworms"	TJ Sullivan	Netflix
2015 (43rd)	Elf: Buddy's Musical Christmas		Mark Caballero, Seamus Walsh	NBC
2015 (43rd)	Pickle and Peanut	"Pickle the Falcon Master"	Ken Wong	Disney XD
2015 (43rd)	Steven Universe	"The Test"	Ian Jones-Quartey	Cartoon Network
2016 (44th)
2016 (44th)	Pearl		Patrick Osborne	Google Sportlight Stories
2016 (44th)	A Love Story		Saschka Unseld	YouTube
2016 (44th)	Adventure Time	"Bad Jubies"	Kirsten Lepore	Cartoon Network
2016 (44th)	Open Season: Scared Silly		David Feiss	Sony Pictures Animation
2016 (44th)	Wander Over Yonder	"My Fair Hatey"	Dave Thomas, Eddie Trigueros, Justin Nichols	Disney Channel
2017 (45th)
2017 (45th)	Mickey Mouse	"The Scariest Story Ever: A Mickey Mouse Halloween Spooktacular!"	Dave Wasson, Eddie Trigueros, Alonso Ramirez-Ramos	Disney Channel
2017 (45th)	Dragons: Race to the Edge	"Sandbusted"	T.J. Sullivan	Netflix
2017 (45th)	Tangled: The Series	"Tangled Before Ever After"	Tom Caulfield, Stephen Sandoval	Disney Channel
2017 (45th)	The Simpsons	"Treehouse of Horror XXVIII"	Timothy Bailey	Fox
2017 (45th)	Trollhunters: Tales of Arcadia	"Unbecoming"	Andrew Schmidt	Netflix
2018 (46th)
2018 (46th)	Mickey Mouse	"Feed the Birds"	Eddie Trigueros	Disney Channel
2018 (46th)	Ask the StoryBots	"What Is Electricity?"	Evan Spiridellis	Netflix
2018 (46th)	3Below: Tales of Arcadia	"Terra Incognita, Part 1"	Guillermo del Toro, Rodrigo Blaas	Netflix
2018 (46th)	Niko and the Sword of Light	"The Thorn of Contention"	Sung Jin Ahn	Prime Video
2018 (46th)	SuperMansion	"Sympathy for Black Saturn"	Nick Simotas	Crackle/Adult Swim
2019 (47th)
2019 (47th)	Mickey Mouse	"For Whom the Booth Tolls"	Alonso Ramirez Ramos	Disney Channel
2019 (47th)	Ask the StoryBots	"How Do You Make Music?"	Jeff Gill	Netflix
2019 (47th)	Rilakkuma and Kaoru	"Snowman"	Masahito Kobayashi	Netflix
2019 (47th)	ULTRAMAN	"Episode 1"	Kenji Kamiyama, Shinji Aramaki	Netflix
2019 (47th)	DC Super Hero Girls	"#DCSuperHeroBoys"	Natalie Wetzig	Cartoon Network

=== 2020s ===
Year	Program	Episode(s)	Director(s)	Network
2020 (48th)
2020 (48th)	Primal	"Plague of Madness"	Genndy Tartakovsky	Adult Swim
2020 (48th)	Great Pretender	"CASE1_1: Los Angeles Connection"	Hiro Kaburagi	Netflix
2020 (48th)	Mao Mao: Heroes of Pure Heart	"Mao Mao's Nakey"	Michael Moloney	Cartoon Network
2020 (48th)	Rise of the Teenage Mutant Ninja Turtles	"Battle Nexus NYC"	Alan Wan	Nickelodeon
2020 (48th)	The Wonderful World of Mickey Mouse	"Hard to Swallow"	Eddie Trigueros	Disney+
2021 (49th)
2021 (49th)	Arcane	"The Monster You Created"	Pascal Charue, Arnaud Delord, Barthelemy Maunoury	Netflix
2021 (49th)	Amphibia	"True Colors"	Jenn Strickland, Kyler Spears	Disney Channel
2021 (49th)	Crossing Swords	"Tent Pitching"	John Harvatine, Brad Schaffer, Ethan Marak	Hulu
2021 (49th)	Hilda and the Mountain King		Andy Coyle	Netflix
2021 (49th)	Maya and the Three	"The Sun and the Moon"	Jorge R. Gutierrez	Netflix
2022 (50th)
2022 (50th)	The Boy, the Mole, the Fox and the Horse		Peter Baynton, Charlie Mackesy	Apple TV+
2022 (50th)	Baymax!	"Sofia"	Lissa Treiman	Disney+
2022 (50th)	Oni: Thunder God's Tale	"The Demon Moon Rises"	Daisuke "Dice" Tsutsumi	Netflix
2022 (50th)	e∞ception	"Misprint"	Yûzô Satô	Netflix
2022 (50th)	More Than I Want to Remember		Amy Bench, Maya Edelman	Mugeni Film
2023 (51st)
2023 (51st)	Star Wars: Visions	"Screecher's Reach"	Paul Young	Disney+
2023 (51st)	Kizazi Moto: Generation Fire	"Moremi"	Shofela Coker, Andrew McNally	Disney+
2023 (51st)	My Dad the Bounty Hunter	"Bizarre Ride"	Kenji Ono, Kai Akira, Patrick Harpin	Netflix
2023 (51st)	Pokémon Concierge	"What's on Your Mind, Psyduck?"	Iku Ogawa	Netflix
2023 (51st)	Scavengers Reign	"The Fall"	Diego Porral	Max
2024 (52nd)
2024 (52nd)	Arcane	"The Dirt Under Your Nails"	Arnaud Delord, Pascal Charrue, Bart Maunoury	Netflix
2024 (52nd)	Big City Greens the Movie: Spacecation		Anna O'Brian	Disney Channel
2024 (52nd)	Bob's Burgers	"They Slug Horses, Don't They?"	Bernard Derriman	Fox
2024 (52nd)	Tabby McTat		Jac Hamman, Sarah Scrimgeour	BBC One
2024 (52nd)	Tales of the Teenage Mutant Ninja Turtles	"The Pearl"	Alan Wan, Colin Heck	Paramount+
2025 (53rd)
2025 (53rd)	Common Side Effects	"Cliff's Edge"	Vincent Tsui	Adult Swim
2025 (53rd)	Dan Da Dan	"Clash! Space Kaiju vs. Giant Robot!"	Fuga Yamashiro, Abel Góngora	Netflix
2025 (53rd)	Not a Box	"It's a Boat"	Siri Melchior	Apple TV
2025 (53rd)	Tales of the Teenage Mutant Ninja Turtles	"Rise of the Night Ninja"	JJ Conway, Kevin Molina-Ortiz	Paramount+
2025 (53rd)	The Quinta's Ghost		James A. Castillo	Martirio Films & Illusorium Films
