= Bender Gets Made =

- Futurama episode
- Episode no.: Season 2 Episode 13
- Directed by: Peter Avanzino
- Written by: Eric Horsted
- Production code: 2ACV13
- Original air date: April 30, 2000

Episode features
- Opening caption: Simulcast On Crazy People's Fillings
- Opening cartoon: "Up to Mars" (1930)

Episode chronology
| ← Previous "The Deep South" | Next → "Mother's Day" |
- Futurama season 2

"Bender Gets Made" is the thirteenth episode in the second season of the American animated television series Futurama, and the 26th episode of the series overall. It originally aired on the Fox network in the United States on April 30, 2000.

== Plot ==
The Planet Express crew attends a taping of Elzar's television show, much to the joy of Bender, who enjoys cooking. Bender continually disrupts Elzar in the middle of the show, until he takes a photo causing Elzar to accidentally spray Leela in the eye with his spice weasel. Leela, who is now temporarily blinded, is forced to wear an eye patch to protect her eye until it is healed. In order to make up for the incident, Elzar invites the entire crew to dinner at his restaurant, serving them the most expensive and appetizing things he has to offer. After the dinner, he bills them, despite the crew being led to believe that the dinner was free. Unable to afford the $1200 bill, Elzar solves things by having them arrested. However, Bender convinces Elzar to let Bender work for him to pay off the debt.

While working at Elzar's restaurant as a busboy, Bender meets the Robot Mafia, and is offered a chance to join them. He jumps at the chance of doing something he enjoys for a living: stealing (Elzar indifferently allows him to quit his job). Bender, under the nickname "Blotto", works hard for the Mafia, quickly becoming one of the Donbot's favorites. Unfortunately for Bender, the whole job turns sour when the target of the Mafia's long planned Zuban Cigar heist is the Planet Express Ship. In an intense space battle, the Robot Mafia destroy the fuel line, and board the ship, where they blindfold Fry, and tie him up with Leela. The ship is robbed, but instead of blowing up the ship and leaving with the Robot Mafia, Bender remains on board, telling the Robot Mafia he will take care of the crew. When the Robot Mafia fly away, Bender ties himself up next to Leela and Fry, and makes up a crazy story to remain unexposed. Back at Planet Express, Leela's eye has recovered and Bender quits the Robot Mafia.

== Continuity ==
- A deleted scene had Bender cross out his serial number, 3370318, and replace it with "14" as a means of hiding from the Mob. However, the crossed-out serial number was shown to be 2716057, the serial number given by Flexo seven episodes prior in "The Lesser of Two Evils". This was meant to imply that at some intervening point Flexo had taken over Bender's life. The scene was removed after the creators decided it would irk fans and render the later episode "Bendless Love" (in which Bender impersonates Flexo in order to prove that Angleyne still loves Flexo) entirely incomprehensible.
- The episode features the first appearance of The Robot Mafia, Donbot, Clamps, and Joey Mousepad.
- Bender comments that his food tastes good even though it was established in "My Three Suns" that Bender has no taste buds.
- Smitty describes his motivation for becoming a police officer: the failure of his father's restaurant business due to 'dine and dash' thefts. This contradicts "Space Pilot 3000" in which it was originally established that a person's job was assigned to them rather than chosen.
- Much like in other episodes, Dr. Zoidberg is treated unfairly: when Leela damages the Planet Express building during an attempt to take off while blind, Hermes states that the repair costs will come out of Zoidberg's pay.
- The Masked Unit from "Raging Bender" can be seen in the background in the Little Bitaly scene. Other recurring extras and minor characters can also be seen.
- Professor Farnsworth says, "Holy zombie Jesus". He used the same phrase in the episode, "The Deep South" (which was also censored when aired on Cartoon Network and TBS, but not FOX, Comedy Central, or on the DVDs).

== Cultural references ==
- The police batons are visually similar to lightsabers. However, they are functionally different; instead of being used as blades for cutting, they are used as nightsticks for beating.
- The character Elzar is a reference to the television chef Emeril Lagasse as is his television program and restaurant.
- The laser guns the Robot Mafia uses look almost exactly like the Thompson Sub-Machine gun which is the stereotypical gun used by the original Mafia.
- URL refers to the Marmaduke newspaper cartoon.
- MmmTV, the channel that broadcasts Elzar's television show, is a reference to MTV.
- Leela's eye is treated at the Taco Bellevue Hospital, a reference to Taco Bell and the real Bellevue Hospital. To further this reference, one of the doctors appearing there is a parody of the Taco Bell spokesman of the time, a talking chihuahua-like alien.
- Bender correctly guesses that the Robot Mafia's "private lottery" is an illegal numbers game; Clamps insists they are into "nothing fancy, you know, ones and zeroes mostly", a reference to the binary numeral system used in computers.
- "Sammy 'the Mechanical Bull' Gravano" is a reference to real-life mobster Salvatore "Sammy the Bull" Gravano, an associate of John Gotti.
- Clamps says, "Bada-climp bada-clamp" which is a reference to "Bada-bing bada-boom."

== Reception ==
The A.V. Club gave the episode a B, stating it "takes a convoluted path to get to its destination, and while the path is fun, the end result is a little too pedestrian."
