= Futurama season 2 =

2nd season of Futurama

Futurama
- Season 2
- DVD cover for the 2012 re-release of Volume Two featuring Morbo.
- Showrunner: David X. Cohen
- No. of episodes: 19

Release
- Original network: Fox
- Original release: November 21, 1999 – December 3, 2000

Season chronology
- ← Previous; Season 1 Next → Season 3

The second season of Futurama began airing on November 21, 1999 and concluded after 19 episodes on December 3, 2000. Halfway through the season on February 6, 2000, Fox moved the show from its original timeslot of 8:30pm (following The Simpsons) to 7pm. At this time, the show lost half of its viewers.

The original 72-episode run of Futurama was produced as four seasons; Fox broadcast the episodes out of the intended order, resulting in five aired seasons.

This list features the episodes in original production order, as featured on the DVD box sets.

The full nineteen episodes of the season have been released on a box set called Futurama: Volume Two, on DVD and VHS. It was first released in the United Kingdom on November 11, 2002, with releases in other regions in 2003. The season was re-released as Futurama: Volume 2, with entirely different packaging to match the newer seasons released on July 17, 2012.

== Episodes ==
No. overall	No. in season	Title	Directed by	Written by	Original release date	Prod. code	U.S. viewers (millions)
14	1	"I Second That Emotion"	Mark Ervin	Patric M. Verrone	November 21, 1999	2ACV01	15.32
During Nibbler's birthday party, Bender becomes annoyed at how little attention he is getting and flushes Nibbler down the toilet. Distraught, Leela wishes that Bender could understand human emotions, so Professor Farnsworth installs an empathy chip in Bender so that he can feel Leela's emotions as she feels them. Leela's sadness of losing Nibbler becomes too great for Bender, who flushes himself down the toilet to find and rescue Nibbler in the sewers. Fry and Leela follow Bender and encounter a group of sewer mutants who live in fear of a monster called El Chupanibre, believing it to be Nibbler. Nibbler returns safely, but it turns out that he is not the monster, which appears alongside him. Bender tries to fight El Chupanibre, but Leela's fear for Nibbler's safety immobilizes him, so he convinces her to think only about herself rather than others, which gives Bender the strength to drive off the monster. Bender's empathy chip is later removed, though Leela has learned that being like Bender is better than being nice.
15	2	"Brannigan, Begin Again"	Jeffrey Lynch	Lewis Morton	November 28, 1999	2ACV02	13.34
Zapp Brannigan and his subordinate Kif are court-martialed and dishonorably discharged after destroying the new DOOP headquarters. Unemployed, Zapp and Kif take up jobs at Planet Express. During a mission, Zapp plays upon Leela's harsh treatment of Fry and Bender and convinces the two to stage a mutiny so that he may attack a neutral planet, hoping it will get him reinstated in the DOOP. Fry and Bender discover the plan is a suicide mission, so they free Leela and foil Zapp's plan. Zapp later tries to take credit for the Planet Express crew's heroics, and he and Kif are reinstated in the DOOP after Leela supports his testimony to keep Zapp away from her.
16	3	"A Head in the Polls"	Bret Haaland	J. Stewart Burns	December 12, 1999	2ACV03	12.84
After the price of titanium skyrockets, Bender pawns his titanium-rich body. Now nothing more than a head, Bender begins to live glamorously until he meets the head of former president Richard Nixon, who tells him that life as a head is actually depressing. Bender decides to buy his body back, only to find it has already been bought by Nixon so that he may participate in the current election race for President of Earth. Fry, Leela, and Bender confront Nixon over Bender's body, and Nixon rants about his devious future plans for Earth, which Bender records and uses to blackmail Nixon into giving his body back. The three believe they have defeated Nixon, but because Leela forgot to vote, Nixon wins by a single vote thanks to acquiring a new, giant war robot's body.
17	4	"Xmas Story"	Peter Avanzino	David X. Cohen	December 19, 1999	2ACV04	12.45
Fry becomes homesick during his first 31st century Christmas, called "Xmas". His insensitive moping hurts Leela's feelings because she has no family to celebrate Xmas with, and she runs off in tears. Fry goes out to buy Leela a present to apologize, but the others warn him to return by sundown, or else he will encounter Robot Santa, a murderous robot who kills anyone he believes to be "naughty", which is practically everyone. Fry finds Leela and the two reconcile, but it gets late and they are attacked by Robot Santa on their way back home. Robot Santa tries to break into the building, but everyone teams up to drive him away. Everyone celebrates their victory over Robot Santa, who threatens to return next Xmas.
18	5	"Why Must I Be a Crustacean in Love?"	Brian Sheesley	Eric Kaplan	February 6, 2000	2ACV05	6.65
Zoidberg's recent aggressive behavior indicates it is mating season for his species. Zoidberg goes with the crew to his home planet of Decapod 10 for the mating frenzy, but his erotic display fails to attract any mates, including a female Decapodian and an old acquaintance of Zoidberg's named Edna. Fry teaches Zoidberg how to win Edna's heart through romance, but she begins to grow attracted to Fry instead upon learning that he is responsible for Zoidberg's romantic behavior. Enraged, Zoidberg challenges Fry to a fight to the death over Edna's affections, but the other Decapodians leave partway through the fight to participate in the mating frenzy, including Edna, who mates with the Decapodian king instead. Having missed out on the mating frenzy, Zoidberg reveals that everyone who participates in it dies after laying their eggs and apologizes to Fry.
19	6	"The Lesser of Two Evils"	Chris Sauvé	Eric Horsted	February 20, 2000	2ACV06	7.07
The Planet Express crew meets another bending robot named Flexo, who bears a striking resemblance to Bender, save for a goatee. Bender and Flexo become friends, but Fry suspects Flexo to be Bender's evil twin. Flexo joins the crew on their way to the Miss Universe pageant to help guard a valuable Jumbonium atom, but when they arrive at the pageant, the atom is missing and Fry immediately suspects Flexo. Bender gets into a fight with Flexo to stop him until it is revealed that Bender is the one who stole the atom. The atom is recovered, but Flexo is accidentally imprisoned for Bender's crime.
20	7	"Put Your Head on My Shoulders"	Chris Loudon	Ken Keeler	February 13, 2000	2ACV07	7.94
Fry goes with Amy to try out her newly purchased car on Mercury. When the car runs out of gas, the two make love while waiting for a tow truck and begin dating. Valentine's Day approaches and Fry begins to feel smothered by Amy, but as Fry prepares to break up with her, they get into a car accident that nearly kills him. With his body severely damaged, Fry's head is kept alive by being grafted onto Amy's shoulder. Fry breaks up with Amy anyway upon returning to Earth, so she arranges another date that Fry is forced to attend. Before Fry can unwillingly join Amy in an intimate relationship with her boyfriend, Leela saves him by prolonging their conversation and canceling their evening plans. Fry has his head reattached to his repaired body the next day, and he and Amy continue to remain friends.
21	8	"Raging Bender"	Ron Hughart	Lewis Morton	February 27, 2000	2ACV08	8.19
Bender inadvertently defeats a champion robot boxer and is hired to become a member of the Ultimate Robot Fighting League. Leela agrees to train Bender to get back at her old sexist martial arts teacher Fnog. Bender becomes more popular with each fight he wins, which all turn out to be fixed, causing him to neglect his training. Soon, however, Bender's popularity begins to dwindle and he is instructed to throw the next match against a giant robot called Destructor. Leela only agrees to help Bender upon learning his opponent is trained by Fnog. During the fight, Leela discovers Destructor is being controlled remotely by Fnog, who she fights and beats up. Bender tries to use this opportunity to defeat Destructor, but his opponent falls on him and he loses the match anyway.
22	9	"A Bicyclops Built for Two"	Susie Dietter	Eric Kaplan	March 19, 2000	2ACV09	6.55
Leela meets another cyclops named Alcazar, who appears to be the only other remaining member of their kind following the destruction of their home planet of Cyclopia. Leela moves into Alcazar's castle and decides it is her duty to help rebuild their civilization with him, but he begins to treat her like a slave. Fry grows suspicious of Alcazar, but before he can persuade Leela, Alcazar proposes to her and she accepts. During the wedding, Fry and Bender discover that the planet has four other castles, each housing a different alien whom Alcazar had proposed to and is preparing to marry on the same day. Fry exposes the secret and Alcazar's five brides gang up on him, forcing him to reveal his true form as a shapeshifting bug-like alien. As they leave Alcazar's planet, Leela begins contemplating the odds of finding the planet she came from.
23	10	"A Clone of My Own"	Rich Moore	Patric M. Verrone	April 9, 2000	2ACV10	5.34
Farnsworth celebrates his 150th birthday, but begins to grow concerned about what will become of his inventions after he is gone, so he names a clone of himself, Cubert Farnsworth, to be his successor. However, Cubert shows no interest in becoming an inventor and harshly criticizes all of Farnsworth's ideas and inventions. Saddened, Farnsworth leaves a will revealing that he is in fact 160 years old, the age when people are taken to the Near-Death Star, a retirement home-like facility from which they never return. The crew and Cubert rescue Farnsworth while he is still unconscious, but their ship's light-speed engines are damaged. A blow Cubert sustained to the head during the escape causes him to gain Farnsworth's understanding of how the engines work. The crew safely returns to Earth, and Cubert tells Farnsworth that he has decided to follow in his "father's" footsteps.
24	11	"How Hermes Requisitioned His Groove Back"	Mark Ervin	Bill Odenkirk	April 2, 2000	2ACV11	5.46
When Hermes takes a stress-relieving vacation, replacement bureaucrat Morgan Proctor becomes infatuated with Fry. Bender threatens to publicize their affair, but Morgan removes Bender's memory and hides it within the cavernous Central Bureaucracy.
25	12	"The Deep South"	Bret Haaland	J. Stewart Burns	April 16, 2000	2ACV12	5.74
A fishing trip over the ocean takes a turn for the worse when a colossal mouth bass pulls the Planet Express ship to the bottom of the sea. There, Fry falls in love with a mermaid named Umbriel with long blonde hair, and the crew discovers the sunken city of Atlanta, Georgia.
26	13	"Bender Gets Made"	Peter Avanzino	Eric Horsted	April 30, 2000	2ACV13	5.74
Bender takes a new job in the Robot Mafia, but his loyalty is tested when he goes along on the robotic gangster's efforts to rob the Planet Express ship.
27	14	"Mother's Day"	Brian Sheesley	Lewis Morton	May 14, 2000	2ACV14	6.09
Mom reprograms the world's robots to rebel against humanity. The only hope of salvation is Mom's old flame - Professor Farnsworth, who must rekindle his romance with Mom in order to save mankind.
28	15	"The Problem with Popplers"	Chris Sauvé & Gregg Vanzo	Story by : Darin Henry & Patric M. Verrone; Teleplay by : Patric M. Verrone	May 7, 2000	2ACV15	5.58
The crew discovers an irresistible source of food on a distant planet, and brings it back to Earth to be sold at the Fishy Joe's restaurant chain. But when it's discovered that the so-called "Popplers" are actually Omicronian babies, the Omicronians demand recompense.
29	16	"Anthology of Interest I"	Chris Loudon & Rich Moore	Eric Rogers	May 21, 2000	2ACV16	5.47
29	16	"Anthology of Interest I"	Chris Loudon & Rich Moore	Ken Keeler	May 21, 2000	2ACV16	5.47
29	16	"Anthology of Interest I"	Chris Loudon & Rich Moore	David X. Cohen	May 21, 2000	2ACV16	5.47
Farnsworth invents a What-If machine that simulates the Planet Express crew's wishes: Bender asks what if he were 500 feet (150 m) tall; Leela asks what if she were more impulsive; and Fry asks what if he never came to the future. Terror at 500 Feet – Bender is built on another planet to be 500 feet tall and comes to Earth to wreak havoc. Desperate to put an end to Bender's rampage, the Planet Express crew turns Zoidberg into a 500-foot-tall (150 m) giant who fights and kills Bender. Dial L for Leela – Farnsworth tells Leela that she will be named his successor because she is boring and predictable. Acting on impulse, Leela kills Farnsworth and the rest of the Planet Express crew except Fry, who she has sex with to keep him quiet. The Un-Freeze of a Lifetime – After just missing falling into the cryogenic tube, Fry discovers a wormhole that threatens to destroy the universe if Fry does not go to the future. Instead of stepping into the tube, Fry destroys it and brings about the end of the universe.
30	17	"War Is the H-Word"	Ron Hughart	Eric Horsted	November 26, 2000	2ACV17	6.00
Upon enrolling in the Earth army to get a military discount at the convenience store, Fry and Bender are whisked into war against a planet of ball-like aliens. Leela secretly enters the ranks to keep an eye on her friends.
31	18	"The Honking"	Susie Dietter	Ken Keeler	November 5, 2000	2ACV18	9.78
At his late Uncle Vladimir's estate, Bender is run over by a vicious Werecar, inheriting the curse. The only way to stop Bender's fatal transformations is to seek out and destroy the original Werecar - the deadly Project Satan.
32	19	"The Cryonic Woman"	Mark Ervin	J. Stewart Burns	December 3, 2000	2ACV19	6.81
Fry, Leela, and Bender all lose their jobs at Planet Express after an accident, and they endeavor to return to their old jobs. Due to a mix-up of their career chips, Fry becomes a career counsellor at Applied Cryogenics, where he meets up with a familiar defrostee - his girlfriend from the 20th century, Michelle.

== Critical reception ==
=== Reception ===
IGN gave the season a positive review of 9.0/10, "Amazing".

=== Nielsen ratings ===
The season tied for 97th in the seasonal ratings with a 5.4% rating and 8.9% share. It tied with King of the Hill.

== Home releases ==
The original Volume Two home release.

Futurama: Volume Two
Set details			Special features
19 episodes; 4-disc set (DVD); 1.33:1 aspect ratio; Languages: English (Dolby Surround); Subtitles: English SDH; French; Spanish			Optional full-length commentaries on all 19 episodes; Animatic for "Why Must I Be a Crustacean in Love?"; Deleted scenes from 15 episodes; Alien Alphabet; Concept art still gallery; International clips; Hidden yearbook photo easter eggs
Release dates			Optional full-length commentaries on all 19 episodes; Animatic for "Why Must I Be a Crustacean in Love?"; Deleted scenes from 15 episodes; Alien Alphabet; Concept art still gallery; International clips; Hidden yearbook photo easter eggs
Region 1	Region 2	Region 4	Optional full-length commentaries on all 19 episodes; Animatic for "Why Must I Be a Crustacean in Love?"; Deleted scenes from 15 episodes; Alien Alphabet; Concept art still gallery; International clips; Hidden yearbook photo easter eggs
August 12, 2003	November 11, 2002	May 13, 2003	Optional full-length commentaries on all 19 episodes; Animatic for "Why Must I Be a Crustacean in Love?"; Deleted scenes from 15 episodes; Alien Alphabet; Concept art still gallery; International clips; Hidden yearbook photo easter eggs

Futurama: Volume 2
Set details			Special features
19 episodes; 4-disc set (DVD); 1.33:1 aspect ratio; Languages: English (Dolby Surround); Subtitles: English SDH; French; Spanish			Features different packaging to previous release of season, to match newer season releases.: Optional full-length commentaries on all 19 episodes; Animatic for "Why Must I Be a Crustacean in Love?"; Deleted scenes from 15 episodes; Alien Alphabet; Concept art still gallery; International clips; Hidden yearbook photo easter eggs
Release dates			Features different packaging to previous release of season, to match newer season releases.: Optional full-length commentaries on all 19 episodes; Animatic for "Why Must I Be a Crustacean in Love?"; Deleted scenes from 15 episodes; Alien Alphabet; Concept art still gallery; International clips; Hidden yearbook photo easter eggs
Region 1	Region 2	Region 4	Features different packaging to previous release of season, to match newer season releases.: Optional full-length commentaries on all 19 episodes; Animatic for "Why Must I Be a Crustacean in Love?"; Deleted scenes from 15 episodes; Alien Alphabet; Concept art still gallery; International clips; Hidden yearbook photo easter eggs
July 17, 2012	TBA	March 13, 2013	Features different packaging to previous release of season, to match newer season releases.: Optional full-length commentaries on all 19 episodes; Animatic for "Why Must I Be a Crustacean in Love?"; Deleted scenes from 15 episodes; Alien Alphabet; Concept art still gallery; International clips; Hidden yearbook photo easter eggs
