= War Is the H-Word =

- Futurama episode
- Episode no.: Season 2 Episode 17
- Directed by: Ron Hughart
- Written by: Eric Horsted
- Production code: 2ACV17
- Original air date: November 26, 2000

Guest appearance
- Todd Susman as P.A. announcer

Episode features
- Opening caption: Touch Eyeballs To Screen For Cheap Laser Surgery
- Opening cartoon: Felix the Cat in "Neptune Nonsense" (1936)

Episode chronology
← Previous "Anthology of Interest I"	Next → "The Honking"
- Futurama season 2

"War Is the H-Word" is the seventeenth episode in the second season of the American animated television series Futurama, and the 30th episode of the series overall. It originally aired on the Fox network in the United States on November 26, 2000. The episode parodies several war films and shows, including Starship Troopers, Star Wars and M*A*S*H.

== Plot ==
Fry and Bender enlist in the Earth Army to take advantage of the 5% military discount to buy Big Pink ham-flavored chewing gum, planning to leave the army after purchasing the gum. However, within seconds of their enlistment, Earth declares war on Spheron I, a planet that commanding general Zapp Brannigan describes as devoid of any natural resources and possessing no strategic value. Concerned for her friends' safety, Leela attempts to enlist, but she is unable to do so with the Army's men-only policy (owing to Brannigan's advances). Leela sneaks aboard the Nimbus disguised as a man under the name of Lee Lemon (Leela Man), and Brannigan finds himself attracted to this new soldier. Leela takes additional advantage of her disguise to coax Fry into revealing his romantic inclinations, and Fry freely admits that he has a crush on Leela.

The troops are deployed to Spheron I and discover that the enemy is a race of sentient, ball-like creatures. During a battle, a bomb is thrown, Bender opens his chest plate and throws himself on it, absorbing the explosion yet leaving him in critical condition. After the battle, Brannigan sentences Fry to become Kif's assistant for being a war coward, while Bender, now a hero, is treated at a field hospital.

As the soldiers regroup at camp, Richard Nixon's Head sends Bender, now an officer, and Henry Kissinger's Head to negotiate with the Spheron leaders. Leela overhears Nixon and Brannigan discussing the true plan: while Bender was recovering, Nixon had a bomb implanted inside him; the weapon will detonate with enough force to destroy the entire planet when Bender says his most used word, "ass".

Leela and Fry beat up Zapp Brannigan, steal a helicopter then fly to the negotiating hall. In the process Leela reveals her identity while Fry is amazed, Brannigan is merely pleased that his attraction to "Lee Lemon" was in fact heterosexual. Fry stops Bender from accidentally activating the bomb. Bender then threatens to activate the bomb in order to coerce the Brain Balls to surrender. The spheres surrender the planet, incidentally revealing that Spheron I is actually their home world, and then bounce into space and disappear.

Back at Planet Express, Professor Farnsworth and Zoidberg unsuccessfully try to remove the bomb from Bender's body. Instead, they reset the bomb's trigger, utilizing a word from the list of words least said by him. Despite Bender's pleas, the crew refuses to tell him the new trigger word. During the rolling of the credits Bender correctly guesses "antiquing". After a loud boom and flash, Bender states that he is "alright".

== Themes ==
One major theme of the episode is asymmetrical warfare. This was a recurring theme used by the Futurama writers including in episodes "When Aliens Attack", "The Problem with Popplers" and "Lrrreconcilable Ndndifferences". Those episodes featured the people of Earth being outgunned by Lrrr and the aliens from Omicron Persei 8 whereas this episode features the forces of Earth as the conquering army. The episode showcases multiple pop culture influences including M*A*S*H, Starship Troopers, Star Wars, Mulan, and Star Trek, along with being influenced by growing up during the Vietnam War.

== Broadcast and reception ==
In 2006, IGN named this episode as number five in their list of the top 25 Futurama episodes, praising it for its surprisingly successful take on the "well-worn" war genre. Douglas Pratt noted that while the episode was mildly predictable, overall it was still an inspired episode. The A.V. Club gave the episode a B+.
