= Anthology of Interest I =

- Futurama episode
- Episode no.: Season 2 Episode 16
- Directed by: Chris Loudon; Rich Moore
- Written by: Eric Rogers (Terror at 500 Feet); Ken Keeler (Dial L for Leela); David X. Cohen (The Un-Freeze of a Lifetime)
- Production code: 2ACV16
- Original air date: May 21, 2000

Guest appearances
- Al Gore as himself; Stephen Hawking as himself; Nichelle Nichols as herself; Gary Gygax as himself

Episode features
- Opening caption: Painstakingly Drawn Before A Live Audience
- Opening cartoon: "Bosko Shipwrecked!" from Looney Tunes by Harman-Ising Productions (1931)

Episode chronology
← Previous "The Problem with Popplers"	Next → "War Is the H-Word"
- Futurama season 2

"Anthology of Interest I" is the sixteenth episode in the second season of the American animated television series Futurama, and the 29th episode of the series overall. It originally aired on the Fox network in the United States on May 21, 2000. This episode, as well as the later "Anthology of Interest II", serves to showcase three "imaginary" stories, in a manner similar to the "Treehouse of Horror" episodes of Matt Groening's other animated series The Simpsons.

The episode is noteworthy for featuring the addition of Scruffy, the Janitor, to the staff of Planet Express, and as a recurring cast member, after his previous appearance as a stagehand during the Beastie Boys concert in "Hell Is Other Robots".

== Plot ==
Professor Farnsworth shows the crew his new invention, the Fing-Longer, a glove with a long rod meant to be used as an extension of the index finger. He demonstrates it by activating the What-if machine, a device that allows the user to view a simulation of a hypothetical scenario after the user asks it a 'what-if' question.

=== Terror at 500 Feet ===
Bender offers to take the first turn and asks what would happen if he were 500 feet tall. The simulation begins with the giant Bender being built by hundreds of regular-sized bending units on some distant planet. He flies to Earth, where he meets Fry, having recently arrived in the 31st century. Bender takes a liking to him and they become friends.

After Bender destroys nearly all of Central Park while playing with Fry, the military is sent to deal with him. The military is unable to damage Bender with their electric weapons, and Bender continues to wreak havoc upon New New York. To combat Bender, the Professor uses his Enlarging Ray on Zoidberg, only to see him wreak havoc as well. Zoidberg is interrupted by Bender who is not pleased with Zoidberg destroying "his" city. The two fight, with their battle causing massive damage. Bender fills Shea Stadium with boiling water and pushes Zoidberg into it. An enraged and boiled Zoidberg rises out of the water and snaps off Bender's feet, causing him to fall over and impale himself on the Empire State Building. A tearful Fry admonishes the citizens of New New York about the tragedy of Bender, whose final words lament his inability to fulfill his dream to kill all humans. Bender dies, and the scenario ends as the onlookers silently watch on.

=== Dial L for Leela ===
The Professor asks Leela to ask a question. Leela refuses at first, but the rest of the crew teases her for not being impulsive. She asks what would happen if she were slightly more impulsive.

In the simulation, Leela shows off a new pair of boots, bought on a wild impulse - according to her. However, the only difference is a green stripe down the side, which is of no interest to anyone. The Professor calls Leela to his laboratory, where he tells her that he has designated her as his sole heir due to her lack of impulsiveness. Insulted, Leela then karate-kicks the Professor on an impulse, sending him into a pit housing his pet man-eating anteaters where he is devoured alive.

When Hermes discovers the Professor's fate, Dr. Zoidberg assumes the role of a detective and takes it upon himself to solve the murder. Later, Hermes shows Leela the Professor's video will, which shows Leela kicking him into the anteater pit. Leela bludgeons and decapitates Hermes to cover up the first murder, with Zoidberg unaware despite it occurring right in the next room. Shortly after, Bender walks in on Leela while she is getting rid of Hermes' body parts in the sink disposal. He is morally unconcerned, but takes the opportunity to blackmail Leela. She kills Bender by exposing him to the radiation from an open microwave oven and turns his body into a toy car. Realizing she went too far, Leela resolves to chew gum on the next murderous impulse. However, after Amy makes a derisive comment about her, Leela promptly murders her as well, not having any gum.

Zoidberg holds a meeting with the rest of the crew to determine the identity of the killer. Leela shuts off the lights, and kills Cubert, Scruffy, and Nibbler one by one with a sword until only Fry remains, who then leaves the meeting out of boredom just before Zoidberg can reveal Leela to be the killer, via a letter posthumously sent to him from Bender. The next morning, Fry notices Leela eating lobster, which is actually Zoidberg, and accepts her offer to have some with her. Fry realizes that Leela was responsible for the murders, forcing Leela to "do something really impulsive": have sex with Fry to keep him quiet.

=== The Un-Freeze of a Lifetime ===
Fry asks what would happen if he had not been frozen.

In this alternate history, Fry narrowly misses falling into the cryogenic tube, and is never frozen. A rift in the space-time continuum appears, which shows the Planet Express crew in the future. The next day, while telling Mr. Panucci, who dismisses his story, Fry is overheard by regular customer Stephen Hawking who arranges for Fry to be abducted on his way home from work. Fry is introduced to the "Vice Presidential Action Rangers", led by Al Gore, whose constitutional duty is to protect the space-time continuum. His group is filled out by Hawking, Nichelle Nichols, Gary Gygax, and Deep Blue.

Fry explains what happened the previous night. They determine Fry was supposed to die and try to kill him. Another rift appears during the attempted murder, with Bender throwing a beer bottle at the Rangers. Nichols suggests that Fry be frozen in order to stabilize the space-time continuum. Gygax gives Fry his "+1 mace" for protection in the future. Fry suddenly smashes the tube with the mace, creating a paradox and causing the universe to collapse into a space-time rift. All that remains is Fry and the Rangers, floating in a featureless void. The scenario ends with them playing Dungeons & Dragons for the next quadrillion years.

=== Conclusion ===
After the end of Fry's scenario, the Professor curses the What-if machine for simulating scenarios even he found preposterous like Stephen Hawking in a pizzeria. After dumping the What-if machine, the Professor judges the Fing-Longer to be a success and is congratulated by the crew. It is then shown that everything before was just a simulation by the What-if machine created when the Professor asked what would have happened if he had invented the Fing-Longer, leaving him to lament the unfulfilled possibilities.

== Broadcast and reception ==
This episode guest starred Nichelle Nichols and Al Gore, who would make later appearances in "Where No Fan Has Gone Before" and "Crimes of the Hot" respectively. Al Gore received some criticism for his appearance because parts of the show "conflicted starkly with the anti-violence, anti-smoking and family-values themes of Gore's campaign." Gore's spokesperson responded by stating that most viewers would recognize that the show was meant to be entertaining and that it would be taken in the right spirit.

This episode is one of four featured in the Monster Robot Maniac Fun Collection as one of Matt Groening's four favorite episodes of the series. In 2006, IGN ranked this episode as number thirteen on their list of the top 25 episodes of Futurama, noting that although the plots of the three individual segments were not the best work of Futurama, they were each considered to have "killer" comedy.

Zack Handlen of The A.V. Club gave the episode a B, stating, "[T]his still feels like something of a wasted opportunity. If an episode is going to purposefully shirk its story responsibilities, it needs to offer something more that just the fact of its existence. Bender's 'What if I was 500 feet tall?' story has some good gags, and the fight with Zoidberg is fun (and disturbing), but finding out that he and Fry would still have been friends no matter their respective sizes isn't enough to justify the segment. I'm probably just being overly critical here, but the last segment at least demonstrated some ambition. On the whole, 'Anthology' plays out like a moderately engaging thought experiment; certainly not a complete waste, but nothing that justifies the existence of the experiment over another entry that played by the rules."
