= The Deep South (Futurama) =

- Futurama episode
- Episode no.: Season 2 Episode 12
- Directed by: Bret Haaland
- Written by: J. Stewart Burns
- Production code: 2ACV12
- Original air date: April 16, 2000

Guest appearances
- Donovan as himself; Parker Posey as Umbriel

Episode features
- Opening caption: A Stern Warning of Things To Come
- Opening cartoon: "Scrap Happy Daffy" from Looney Tunes by Warner Bros. Cartoons (1943)

Episode chronology
← Previous "How Hermes Requisitioned His Groove Back"	Next → "Bender Gets Made"
- Futurama season 2

"The Deep South" is the twelfth episode in the second season of the American animated television series Futurama, and the 25th episode of the series overall. It originally aired on the Fox network in the United States on April 16, 2000.

== Plot ==
A bureaucratic mix-up results in Hermes receiving a "mandatory fishing license" instead of a pet license for Nibbler. The crew takes the Planet Express Ship to the center of the Atlantic Ocean, and starts fishing. After failing to catch anything, a bored Bender fashions a large fish hook and attaches it to the ship's unbreakable diamond filament tether. Sunset comes, and the crew is ready to head back to New New York. Bender begins to haul in his line, but he has caught a colossal-mouth bass. The bass dives, dragging the ship to the bottom of the ocean before the hook slips loose. The Planet Express Ship survives its trek to the bottom, but its engines will not work underwater.

Professor Farnsworth conveniently has an anti-pressure suppository which Fry uses to go help forage for food with Bender and Dr. Zoidberg. Separated from them, Fry sees a mermaid; but when he returns to the ship, no one believes him. That night, the mermaid, Umbriel, lures Fry out of the ship, and they leave to explore the wonders of the ocean bottom.

The next morning, the crew finishes modifying the ship to return to the surface, but finds Fry missing. They set off following Zoidberg's underwater sense of smell to track him, and find the legendary lost city of Atlanta. There, they find a civilization of merpeople who speak Southern American English. A documentary (narrated by Donovan) explains that Atlanta moved offshore in an effort to boost tourism but eventually sank to the bottom of the ocean under the weight of its own overdevelopment, and everyone who chose to stay in the city evolved into merpeople. When Bender points out that it would take millions of years for humans to evolve into merpeople, and questions how the people of Atlanta could've done so in less than a thousand years, Umbriel explains that the evolution process was greatly sped up due to the leaking caffeine from the Coca-Cola bottling plant.

Ready to leave, the crew heads back to the ship. Fry announces he is going to stay in Atlanta to be with Umbriel, shocking the crew. Fry settles in to enjoy his life with Umbriel, but abandons her out of disgust after she explains how sexual intercourse between merpeople works. As he runs to try and catch up with his friends, the Planet Express ship leaves without him. Seeing that Bender's hook is still attached to the tether, Fry grabs hold and is dragged behind the ship. The colossal-mouth bass returns, and is hooked when it swallows Fry whole. The bass stays caught, and Fry returns to the surface with the rest of the crew.

== Cultural references ==
- The mermaid, Umbriel, is named after one of Uranus's moons, which the production team chose to do because another of Uranus's moons provided the namesake for Ariel from The Little Mermaid.
- Donovan guest stars as the narrator of the documentary describing how Atlanta got to the bottom of the ocean, with said documentary being a parody of the spoken verse in his 1968 song "Atlantis". The montage of Fry's date with Umbriel is set to the chorus of the same song.

== Broadcast and reception ==
In its initial airing, the episode received a Nielsen rating of 3.6/7, placing it 86th among primetime shows for the week of April 10–16, 2000.

The A.V. Club gave the episode a B, stating "The problem with Deep South is that the main plot, with Fry and Umbriel falling in love, only really exists for the punchline."
