= Loudon =

Loudon may refer to:

== Places ==
In the United States:

- Loudon, Massachusetts, formerly a constituent part of Otis, Massachusetts
- Loudon, New Hampshire
  - Loudon (CDP), New Hampshire
- Loudon, Tennessee
- Loudon County, Tennessee
- Loudoun County, Virginia
- Loudon Township, Fayette County, Illinois
- Loudon Township, Carroll County, Ohio
- Loudon Township, Seneca County, Ohio

== Other uses ==
- Loudon (name)
- The New Hampshire Motor Speedway, in Loudon, New Hampshire
  - Loudon Classic, a motorcycle race held there
- Loudon's Highlanders, 18th century infantry regiment of the British Army
- Loudon Park Cemetery in Baltimore, Maryland
- Loudon Park National Cemetery in Baltimore, Maryland
- Governor General Loudon (ship), mail steamer, named after James Loudon, present at the Krakatoa eruption

== See also ==
- Loudoun, an area in Scotland
- Earl of Loudoun
- John Claudius Loudon Scottish gardener, designer, author and planner
- L'Oudon, a commune in Calvados department, France
- Loudun, a commune in Vienne department, France
- London (disambiguation)
- Louden (disambiguation)
