= Xmas Story =

- Futurama episode
- Episode no.: Season 2 Episode 4
- Directed by: Peter Avanzino
- Written by: David X. Cohen
- Production code: 2ACV04
- Original air date: December 19, 1999

Guest appearances
- John Goodman as Robot Santa; Conan O'Brien as himself

Episode features
- Opening caption: Based On A True Story
- Opening cartoon: Elmer Fudd in "Fresh Hare" from Merrie Melodies by Warner Bros. Cartoons (1942)
- Commentary: Matt Groening: Callum Lunt; David X. Cohen; Conan O'Brien; Al Gore

Episode chronology
← Previous "A Head in the Polls"	Next → "Why Must I Be a Crustacean in Love?"
- Futurama season 2

"Xmas Story" is the fourth episode in the second season of the American animated television series Futurama, and the 17th episode of the series overall. It originally aired on the Fox network in the United States on December 19, 1999. The episode was written by David X. Cohen and directed by Peter Avanzino. John Goodman guest stars in this episode as Robot Santa. The plot of the episode focuses on the first Xmas that Fry spends in the future.

== Plot ==
While on a ski trip, Fry begins to feel nostalgic for 20th century Christmases. To cheer him up, the rest of the Planet Express staff decide to decorate for what is now called Xmas (/ˈɛksməs/), which includes cutting down an Xmas tree (which are now palm trees, since pine trees are extinct). Fry's moping about his first Xmas without his family unknowingly agitates Leela, who has not felt happy about Xmas since she was an orphan, and storms off in tears.

When the others call him out on his mistake, Fry goes to buy a present to cheer Leela up. They warn him to be back before sundown, or else he will be killed by a murderous robotic Santa Claus. In the year 2801, The Friendly Robot Company developed a robotic version of St. Nick himself to determine who has been naughty and who has been nice. Unfortunately, due to a programming error, the jolly robotic saint soon turned into a mad murderer when his standards were set too high. Thus, he will kill anyone who has been naughty, which, by his standards is essentially everybody. Meanwhile, Bender volunteers at a homeless robot shelter, albeit stealing some food from there. He befriends several homeless robots and goes on a robbery spree with them.

Fry buys Leela a parrot, which escapes. Leela heads out to rescue Fry before Robot Santa arrives. After pursuing the parrot to the top of a tall building, Fry is saved from plunging to his death by Leela. Unfortunately, Fry and Leela's safety is short-lived, as sundown finally comes and the robotic Santa Claus makes his appearance and attacks the two friends, who seek solace in their loneliness and begin to fall in love with each other.

Fry and Leela take refuge in the Planet Express building after being saved by Bender and his homeless robot friends, but Santa breaks in through the chimney and claims that they "all have been very naughty", apart from Dr. Zoidberg, whom he gifts a pogo stick. Thanks to some quick thinking by Zoidberg, who uses the pogo stick to cut the wires to the Christmas lights, which then electrocutes Santa, the crew manage to force him back into the chimney, where an explosion sends him and his mechanical reindeer tumbling into the stratosphere.

During Xmas dinner, Fry gives a toast on the importance of togetherness at Xmas. Everyone celebrates by singing "Santa Claus Is Gunning You Down". However, Santa vows to enact revenge on the crew next Xmas.

== Production ==
The plot for this episode was one of the first storylines that Matt Groening and David X. Cohen came up with aside from the series' pilot. They had the basic idea before they pitched the show to Fox, although they did not develop the detailed plot until much later. The episode ended up being controversial although those involved with the show did not expect it to be. Fox was concerned that advertisers would find the episode too controversial for the time slot. When they made a second episode featuring Robot Santa it was delayed for nearly a year before being broadcast in a later time slot.

John Goodman guest stars in this episode as Robot Santa; however, he was unavailable to reprise the role in the later episode "A Tale of Two Santas" so he was replaced by John DiMaggio. Conan O'Brien makes an appearance as his own head in a jar. In order to make a visual joke that O'Brien has a large head in real life the head was drawn sticking out the top of the jar. This choice caused many difficulties for the animators because it did not work with the animation layers typically used for other head-in-a-jar characters. Frank Welker voices Fry's parrot and created the annoying squawk used. The initial squawk he made was considered to be annoying but according to Cohen they had him continue to make the squawk more annoying until he had done nearly a hundred different parrot squawks.

In this episode, Bender receives a card from the machine that built him, referring to him as "Son #1729", a reference to the Hardy–Ramanujan number. According to Ken Keeler, co-executive producer of the series, they could have chosen any number but chose to include an interesting one instead. Many of the maths and science jokes in the series found their way into Futurama in this way. Another small visual joke that was added was that the clock tower is shown at the end of the episode and the time on the clock is the same as the actual time that scene would have been shown in its original airing.

== Cultural references ==
- The children skating on an iced-over pond is a reference to A Charlie Brown Christmas, the first TV special featuring the characters from the Peanuts comic strip.
- The robot Tinny Tim from the "shelter for down-and-out robots" is a reference to the character Tiny Tim from Charles Dickens' A Christmas Carol.
- Bongo, a character from Matt Groening's comic strip Life in Hell, is one of the animals being sold at the pet shop that Fry goes into to buy an Xmas gift for Leela.
- Fry falling down the face of the clock is a reference to The Hudsucker Proxy and to the comic actor Harold Lloyd film Safety Last!.
- The gift exchange of combs references the short story "The Gift of the Magi" by O. Henry.

== Reception ==
Zack Handlen of The A.V. Club gave the episode an A−, stating, "As Christmas episodes go, this manages to be at once cynical and heartfelt, although the heart part is still a little iffy—it's sweet, but somehow perfunctory."
