= How Hermes Requisitioned His Groove Back =

- Futurama episode
- Episode no.: Season 2 Episode 11
- Directed by: Mark Ervin
- Written by: Bill Odenkirk
- Production code: 2ACV11
- Original air date: April 2, 2000

Guest appearance
- Nora Dunn as Morgan Proctor

Episode features
- Opening caption: As Foretold by Nostradamus
- Opening cartoon: "Felix the Cat Trifles with Time" (1925)

Episode chronology
← Previous "A Clone of My Own"	Next → "The Deep South"
- Futurama season 2

"How Hermes Requisitioned His Groove Back" is the eleventh episode in the second season of the American animated television series Futurama, and the 24th episode of the series overall. It originally aired on the Fox network in the United States on April 2, 2000. The title references the 1998 film and popular novel How Stella Got Her Groove Back.

== Plot ==
Hermes is excited because the Central Bureaucracy is conducting an inspection the next day, and he expects to be promoted to a Grade 35 bureaucrat. Leela hosts a poker game with her former co-workers from the cryogenics lab at the office that night. Bender is caught cheating and takes refuge in Hermes’ office. The other players find him and savagely beat him, trashing the office in the process. The mess costs Hermes his promotion, and the inspector, Morgan Proctor, places Hermes on paid vacation, sending him into a suicidal depression. Morgan appoints herself acting as Planet Express head-bureaucrat. Doctor Zoidberg suggests Hermes and his wife LaBarbara take a trip to Spa 5, a sauna planet that gives him a bucket of krill for every patient he sends there.

Morgan, who has a fetish for men who aren't "neat freaks", begins a secret affair with Fry for his messy instincts. Fry is promoted to Executive Delivery Boy, and no longer goes on actual deliveries. After Bender discovers the illicit affair and tries to blackmail them, Morgan downloads his personality and intelligence to a floppy disk, turning him into a mindless drone. She then sends the disk off to the Central Bureaucracy for filing.

Hermes discovers Spa 5 is actually a forced labor camp, and begins to use his natural managerial skills to reorganize the camp for efficiency, to the torment of his fellow workers. The rest of the Planet Express staff infiltrate the Central Bureaucracy in order to recover Bender's mind. After bypassing several employees and security systems, the crew learns that Bender's brain is in one of an enormous pile of pneumatic tube capsules.

Hermes, who has regained his love of bureaucracy, and LaBarbara return from Spa 5. In a musical number, he sorts and files everything in the pile of tubes with amazing speed, finding the disk with Bender's brain in the last tube. He is restored to his original rank of Grade 36 by Number 1.0, the head of the Central Bureaucracy, but immediately demoted to Grade 38 for finishing two seconds early, since bureaucrats should not finish early. Because Morgan is still in charge of Planet Express, she fires Fry for exposing their affair. However, Hermes exposes a mistake she made on her high school prom date papers, having stamped them only four times instead of the standard five. Number 1.0 promotes Hermes to Grade 37 for this, and in turn, orders his assistants to get the papers needed to have Morgan taken away. The Professor re-hires Hermes, but at severely reduced pay in order to pay back the damage done to the office and the Bureaucracy; Hermes does the same to Fry in turn, then cheerfully cuts everyone else's pay as well.

== Cultural references ==
- In the DVD audio commentary, Matt Groening and others mention Terry Gilliam's 1985 film Brazil having an influence over the depiction of the Central Bureaucracy.
- When Dr. Zoidberg is announcing his hand in the poker game, he says he has "three human females, a number, and a king giving himself brain surgery." The king giving itself brain surgery is a reference to the 'Suicide King', the nickname often given to the 'King of Hearts' because on a standard pack of cards he is pictured as if driving a sword into his own head.

== Broadcast and reception ==
In its initial airing, the episode placed 94th in the Nielsen ratings for primetime shows for the week of March 27 – April 2, 2000.

The A.V. Club gave the episode an A, calling it "one of the better episodes of the show’s first two seasons because it hits that hard to reach spot between absolute sincerity and dark satire."
