= Destructor =

Destructor may refer to:

- Destructor (computer programming), in object-oriented programming, a method which is automatically invoked when an object is destroyed
- Euronymous (1968–1993), guitarist and co-founder of the Norwegian black metal band Mayhem who previously used the stage name Destructor
- Spanish warship Destructor, a Spanish Navy torpedo gunboat or destroyer in commission from 1887 to 1908
- Destructor, a Marvel Comics character; see Advanced Idea Mechanics
- Cherax destructor, the scientific name for the Common Yabby
- Destructor, a character in the Futurama episode "Raging Bender"
- Destructor, the stage name of German guitarist Michael Wulf (1963–1993)
- a municipal incinerator; the term destructor was used well into the 20th century
