= Loudon (name) =

Loudon is both a surname and a given name. Notable people with the name include:

Surname:

- Aarnout Loudon (1936–2021), Dutch corporate executive and politician
- Alex Loudon (born 1980), English cricketer
- Chris Loudon (born 1967), American animator
- Dave Loudon (born 1954), Scottish cricketer
- Dorothy Loudon (1925–2003), Broadway actress
- Ernst Gideon Freiherr von Laudon, often written as Loudon (1717–1790), Austrian general
- Harald von Loudon (1876–1959), Baltic-German ornithologist
- Irvine Loudon (1924–2015), British doctor, medical historian and artist
- James Loudon (1841–1916), Canadian professor of physics
- James Loudon (politician) (1824–1900), Dutch politician, governor of Dutch East Indies
- Jane Loudon (née Webb, 1807–1858), English novelist and horticulturist
- Johann Ludwig Alexius von Loudon (1767–1822), Austrian general
- John Claudius Loudon (1783–1843), Scottish botanist
- John Loudon (minister) (1866–1955), Dutch politician and statesman
- John Hugo Loudon (1905–1996), Dutch CEO of Royal Dutch Shell, and president of the WWF
- John William Loudon (born 1967), Missouri state senator
- Margracia Loudon (c.1788–1860), Irish novelist and political author
- Peter Loudon (born 1966), Scottish curler
- Rodney Loudon (1934–2022), British quantum physicist
- Thomas Loudon (1883–1968), Canadian rower
- Trevor Loudon, New Zealand political activist
- William James Loudon (1860–1951), Canadian geologist and photographer

Given name:

- Loudon Wainwright, Jr. (1924–1988), American writer
- Loudon Wainwright III (born 1946), American musician
- William Loudon Mollison (1851–1929), Scottish mathematician and academic

== See also ==
- Louden (disambiguation)
- Loudin
