= My Old Kentucky Home (1926 film) =

1926 film

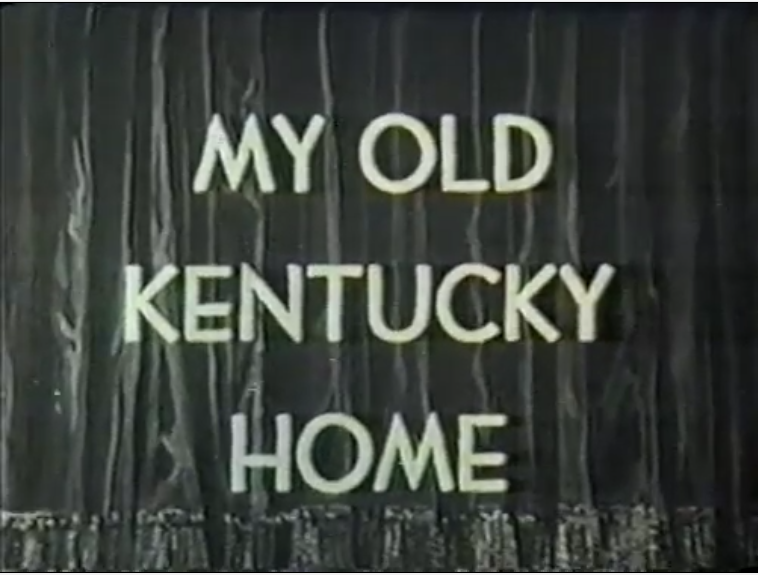
- The title card
- Directed by: Dave Fleischer
- Produced by: Max Fleischer
- Music by: song "My Old Kentucky Home" by Stephen Foster
- Production companies: Out of the Inkwell Studios (National Amusements)
- Distributed by: Red Seal Pictures
- Release date: June 1926
- Running time: 6 minutes
- Country: United States
- Language: English

My Old Kentucky Home is a short animation film originally released on March 13, 1926, produced by Fleischer Studios as part of the Song Car-Tunes series. This cartoon features the original lyrics of "My Old Kentucky Home" (1853) by Stephen Foster, and was one of the 19 installments of the series to feature sound recorded in the Lee de Forest Phonofilm sound-on-film system.

My Old Kentucky Home was long considered to be the earliest attempt at animated dialogue in cartoon history, as a dog, named Pinkie the Pup, mouths the words "Follow the ball, and join in, everybody" in remarkable synchronization though the animation was somewhat limited, making sure that the lip-sync was synchronized perfectly, but resurfaced information indicates that this segment was actually produced in late 1929 by the Weiss Brothers studio, which partially remade a handful of Song Car-Tune shorts, removing the original opening sequences that featured Koko the Clown.

My Old Kentucky Home

== Reception ==
Motion Picture News (March 23, 1926): "The old familiar favorite 'My Old Kentucky Home' furnishes the subject for this Max Fleischer Song Car-Tune. The verses are shown in the usual manner and the comedy handling of the chorus shows a darky girl leaping from word to word doing stunts... This should prove one of the most popular of the series".

The Film Daily (March 28, 1926): "Ko-Ko and his quartet render this time the old southern classic 'My Old Kentucky Home', with the help of the audience of course. Fleischer has a new instruction for the opening, showing the quartet as a band marching and playing, and winding up on the stage of the theatre. There is always a humorous touch added to the chorus of the song. This time in the shape of a little pickaninny who dances along on top of the words".

== In popular culture ==
A clip from the film is used in the opening credits of the Futurama episode "Why Must I Be a Crustacean in Love?"
