= The Car (1977 film) =

1977 film by Elliot Silverstein

- Theatrical release poster
- Directed by: Elliot Silverstein
- Written by: Michael Butler; Dennis Shryack; Lane Slate
- Story by: Michael Butler; Dennis Shryack
- Produced by: Marvin Birdt; Elliot Silverstein
- Starring: James Brolin; Kathleen Lloyd; John Marley; Elizabeth Thompson; Ronny Cox
- Cinematography: Gerald Hirschfeld
- Edited by: Michael McCroskey
- Music by: Leonard Rosenman
- Color process: Technicolor
- Production company: Hollywood Road Films
- Distributed by: Universal Pictures
- Release date: May 13, 1977
- Running time: 98 minutes
- Country: United States
- Language: English

The Car is a 1977 American supernatural horror film directed by Elliot Silverstein and written by Michael Butler, Dennis Shryack and Lane Slate. The film stars James Brolin, Kathleen Lloyd, John Marley and Ronny Cox, along with real-life sisters Kim and Kyle Richards (as Brolin's daughters). It tells the story of a black unmanned self-driving mysterious car that goes on a murderous rampage, terrorizing the residents of a small town.

The film was produced and distributed by Universal Pictures. A spinoff sequel, The Car: Road to Revenge, was released on January 8, 2019, with Ronny Cox returning in the series.

== Plot ==
Two cyclists, Gage and Suzy, riding through a canyon are followed by a mysterious matte black car. At a bridge, the car crushes Suzy against the wall, forcing her to fall over the edge of the canyon, killing her, and rams Gage from behind, catapulting him off the bridge, into the water below, killing him. A hitchhiker encounters the car and insults it after it tries to run him down. It comes to a stop, reverses, and runs him over several times before driving off. The local sheriff's office, called to these hit-and-run incidents, gets a lead on the car. It appears to be heavily customized and has no license plates, as local, Amos Clemens, points out after he sees it run over the hitchhiker.

After intentionally swerving around Amos that night, the car runs over Sheriff Everett Peck, leaving Chief Deputy Wade Parent in charge. During the investigation, an eyewitness to the accident states that no driver was inside the car. Wade asks his girlfriend, Lauren, a teacher at the local school, to cancel the upcoming marching band rehearsals for their safety. Lauren and her friend, Margie, the wife of Wade's deputy, Luke Johnson, ask him to let them rehearse. Luke unwittingly agrees.

The car enters the town and attacks the school marching band as it rehearses at the local showground. It chases the teachers and students into a cemetery, but the vehicle cannot enter the consecrated ground. Lauren taunts the driver, whom no one among the townsfolk has seen. Seemingly angered, the car destroys a brick gate post and leaves. The police go on a high-speed chase along highways throughout the desert before the car turns on them, destroying several squad cars and killing 5 of Wade's deputies. Wade attempts to enter the car when it stops but discovers that it has no door handles. The car's door then opens by itself, knocking Wade unconscious.

After being dropped off at her home that evening, Lauren notices the violent winds that always accompany the car. She runs inside and calls Wade on the phone, but the car drives straight through her house, killing her. Luke explains to a grief-stricken Wade that killing Lauren was an act of revenge for her insults. Wade concocts a plan to defeat the car in a trap in the canyon outside the town. After suddenly discovering it waiting in his garage, seemingly from nowhere, they are forced to carry out his plans with great haste. Wade escapes his garage and is pursued by the car while riding on his dirt bike into the targeted mountainous canyon, where his remaining deputies have set a trap with explosives.

Wade and Luke stand at the edge of a cliff and lure the car towards them. As the car approaches, they jump in opposite directions, causing the car to miss both of them and fly off the cliff, and the deputies set off the dynamite, triggering a massive explosion. To everyone's shock, a monstrous, demonic, snake-like visage appears inside the flames.

The film concludes with the car prowling on the streets of downtown Los Angeles, apparently having survived the explosions, its horn sound still heard distantly.

== Cast ==
- James Brolin as Wade Parent, a chief deputy sheriff
- Kathleen Lloyd as Lauren, a teacher at a local school, and Wade's girlfriend
- John Marley as Everett, the sheriff
- R. G. Armstrong as Amos
- John Rubinstein as John Morris
- Elizabeth Thompson as Margie Johnson, Luke's wife
- Roy Jenson as Ray Mott, a deputy sheriff
- Kim Richards as Lynn Marie, Wade's older daughter
- Kyle Richards as Debbie, Wade's younger daughter
- Kate Murtagh as Miss McDonald
- Robert Phillips as Metcalf
- Doris Dowling as Bertha
- Henry O'Brien as Chas, a deputy sheriff
- Ronny Cox as Luke Johnson, a deputy sheriff

== Production ==
The evil, black car in the film was a highly customized 1971 Lincoln Continental Mark III designed by Hollywood car customizer George Barris. There were four cars built for the film in six weeks. Three were used as stunt cars, the fourth for close-ups. The stunt cars were destroyed during production, while the car used for close-up shots is now in a private collection.

The car's bodywork was painted in steel, pearl and charcoal coloring. The windows were laminated in two different shades, smoked on the inside and amber on the outside, so one could see out of it but not into it. In order to give the car a sinister look as requested by director Elliot Silverstein, Barris made the car's roof four inches lower than usual and altered its side fenders that same length again both higher and longer. According to Silverstein, the distinctive sound the horn of The Car makes spells out the letter X in Morse code, as a meaning of elimination of its victims.

Filming locations in Utah included: St. George, Hurricane-LaVerkin Bridge, Zion, Kanab and Glen Canyon.

Church of Satan leader Anton LaVey is acknowledged as an uncredited technical advisor for the film. The opening credits of the film begins with the quote "Oh great brothers of the night, who rideth upon the hot winds of Hell, who dwelleth in the devil's lair; Move and appear!", which is attributed to LaVey. The quote is a slight alteration of a passage from the "Invocation Employed Towards the Conjuration of Destruction" section in "The Book of Leviathan: The Raging Sea" within The Satanic Bible. The original quote from The Satanic Bible is "Oh great brothers of the night, thou who makest my place of comfort, who rideth out upon the hot winds of Hell, who dwelleth in the devil's fane; Move and appear!"

The film's main theme, heard predominantly throughout, is a reworked, orchestral version of the Dies Irae. The theme was intentionally made to resemble more Berlioz's 5th part of Symphonie fantastique (itself also inspired by Dies Irae), rather than Dies Irae, as it was found to have a more sinister tone than its original counterpart. Moreover, a derivative of the music was also used in the 1991 film Sleeping with the Enemy.

== Reception and home media ==
On the review aggregator website Rotten Tomatoes, 30% of 20 critics' reviews are positive, with an average rating of 3.9/10. Metacritic, which uses a weighted average, assigned the film a score of 21 out of 100, based on 8 critics, indicating "generally unfavorable" reviews.

Vincent Canby of The New York Times wrote that the film "has all the ingredients of a parody, although someone has made the mistake of doing it straight." Chicago Tribune film critic Gene Siskel gave the film one star out of four and wrote, "What's worse than the rotten acting is that 'The Car' makes absolutely no sense as a story. In some scenes, the car is presented as a supernatural being, able to materialize at will. In other scenes, however, the car is hopelessly realistic. Even more surprising is the poor quality of the film's special effects." Arthur D. Murphy of Variety wrote, " 'The Car' is a total wreck. Story concerns a phantom auto on a killing spree (allegory, anyone?) in a small western town where everybody overacts badly." Kevin Thomas of the Los Angeles Times wrote that the film's "various special effects are superior," but stated, "With often laughable dialogue—some of it deleted after previews—the film's appeal is limited to the undiscriminating seeking a new sensation." Gary Arnold of The Washington Post called it "a blatant, pitiful attempt to recycle elements from superior scare vehicles," namely Duel and Jaws. John Gillett of The Monthly Film Bulletin stated that the film "manages to be a fairly brisk thriller" when the action was focused on the car, but lamented that director Silverstein "has been saddled with one of those small-town family scripts complete with Deputy Sheriff romping with his schoolteacher friend, a drink-and-neurosis-ridden police force, and some generally strained acting by a less than starry cast."

The film is listed in Golden Raspberry Award founder John Wilson's book The Official Razzie Movie Guide as one of the 100 Most Enjoyably Bad Movies Ever Made.

The Car was released in standard definition and without additional features on VHS and DVD by Anchor Bay Entertainment on July 20, 1999. Arrow Films released The Car on Blu-ray on December 15, 2015. The Blu-ray release features the first HD 1080p transfer of the film, as well as commentary and additional features. The television show Svengoolie featured the film with commentary in April 2026.

=== In popular culture ===
Several television series have paid homage to the film, particularly in animated sitcoms. In the Futurama episode "The Honking", the character Bender transforms into a demonic car whose appearance was inspired by the car of the film. In the subplot of the American Dad! episode "Virtual In-Stanity", Roger becomes a limo driver, and uses the car to kill a group of fraternity brothers who stiffed him on his $20 fee. The American drama television series Supernatural also paid homage to the film in "Route 666", which involved a ghost truck involved in a string of racially motivated murders.

The song "The Golden Age of Video" by Ricardo Autobahn features a sequence that uses sampled dialogue and imagery from The Car.

== Spinoff sequel ==
In 2019, 42 years after the original film, a spinoff sequel (also starring Ronny Cox, but as a different character) was released called The Car: Road to Revenge to negative reviews.

== See also ==
Similar titles

- "You Drive", a 1964 episode of The Twilight Zone about a car that pursues its owner following a hit and run. In the 1960 episode "A Thing About Machines", the protagonist's car chases him around.
- Duel, a film about a salesman pursued by a truck with an unseen driver.
- Killdozer!, a 1974 film about a possessed bulldozer.
- Crash!, a 1977 film also about an unmanned and possessed car that rampages on the roads causing carnage, released in the same year as The Car but 4 months earlier.
- The Hearse, a 1980 horror movie about a possessed hearse.
- Christine, a 1983 horror film inspired by Stephen King's novel of the same name about a possessed red 1958 Plymouth Fury.
- Nightmares, a 1983 movie made up of four separate story segments; the third, "The Benediction", features a traveling priest attacked on the highway by a demonic 4x4.
- Maximum Overdrive, a 1986 horror movie, based on the short story "Trucks" by Stephen King (and directed by King).
  - Trucks, a more faithful 1997 made-for-TV film based on the King short story.
- Wheels of Terror, a 1990 made-for-TV film about a mysterious car with an unseen driver terrorizing a small Arizona community.
- The Wraith, a 1986 action/horror film in which a mysterious man/spirit descends from the sky and manifests in a sports car and targets a local violent road-racing gang of motor heads.
- Black Cadillac, a 2003 film about a mysterious black Cadillac that stalks three young men as they make their way through the virtually deserted mountain roads of Wisconsin.
- Phantom Racer, a 2009 made-for-TV Syfy film about a race car possessed by the spirit of its driver seeking revenge against his former rival.
- Super Hybrid, a 2011 film about a shapeshifting monster that transforms into cars.
- The Honking
