= Loudin =

Loudin is a surname. It may originate in Scotland, where Loudin or Loudon are alternative spellings of Lothian, a place name. Notable people with the surname include:

- Forest Loudin (1890–1935), American football coach
- Frederick J. Loudin (1836–1904), American singer
- Vojtěch Loudín (born 1990), Czech skater

== Maureen Loudin ==
- Loudon (name)
- Lowden (disambiguation)
