= A Bicyclops Built for Two =

- Futurama episode
- Episode no.: Season 2 Episode 9
- Directed by: Susan Dietter
- Written by: Eric Kaplan
- Production code: 2ACV09
- Original air date: March 19, 2000

Episode features
- Opening caption: This Episode Has Been Modified To Fit Your Primitive Screen
- Opening cartoon: "Hollywood Capers" from Looney Tunes by Warner Bros. Cartoons (1935)

Episode chronology
← Previous "Raging Bender"	Next → "A Clone of My Own"
- Futurama season 2

"A Bicyclops Built for Two" is the ninth episode in the second season of the American animated television series Futurama, and the 22nd episode of the series overall. It originally aired on the Fox network in the United States on March 19, 2000.

== Plot ==
The Professor announces to the Planet Express crew that he has finally logged onto AOL after years of trying and sends them into the Internet for fun. While playing the video game Death Factory III, Leela meets another cyclops, but Fry blasts his virtual form before she can find out who he is and where he comes from. The crew is sent on a mission to deliver popcorn to Cineplex 14. However, the other cyclops recorded her screen name beforehand and sends her a video message. Leela abandons the delivery and heads off to the coordinates provided.

The cyclops introduces himself as Alcazar, sole survivor of the destruction of the planet Cyclopia. He shows Leela some of the capital city's landmarks, including the sacred Forbidden Valley, before bringing her to the castle where he lives. He says Cyclopia was destroyed by a missile launched by the blind mole people of Subterra 3. Before the destruction, Cyclopia's smartest scientist sent away a baby who Leela concludes must have been her. Alcazar was employed as a pool cleaner and was spared from the chaos while fishing out a dead possum. Leela decides it is her duty to help rebuild the Cyclopian civilization, primarily by procreating with Alcazar. Now that Leela is committed to Alcazar for the good of their race, he becomes abusive towards her, forcing her to do menial tasks and turning their romance into a typical episode of the lowbrow 1980s FOX sitcom, Married... with Children with Alcazar as Al Bundy and Leela as his sarcastic, tastelessly-dressed wife, Peg. While Bender loots everything of value, Fry, feeling suspicious of Alcazar, tries to investigate the Forbidden Valley, only to stumble into a trap door leading to a dungeon. When Leela visits Fry in the dungeon, she reveals she hates Alcazar for the way he treats her, so Fry convinces her to dump him; she almost dumps him until he proposes marriage. Wanting to extend their race, Leela reluctantly accepts.

When Leela refuses Fry's entreaties to let him out of the dungeon, he escapes and breaks into the Forbidden Valley with Bender. They discover four other castles, identical except that the decorations depict different species. They return and interrupt Leela's wedding, bringing with them four women, each of a different species, and each scheduled to be married to Alcazar on the same day as Leela. Alcazar, flustered, involuntarily reveals his true form as a shapeshifting, cricket-like alien. After the women beat him into submission, he explains that he played with their emotions in order to get free labor for his castles, and that he had to stage all the weddings on one day because tuxedos that change shape are expensive to rent. As Leela leaves with the rest of the Planet Express crew, the Professor tries to reassure her she will find her true home, but she disconsolately wonders "How many planets could there be?" as she looks out at a vast, starry space.

== Cultural references ==
The new look that Leela takes on to please "Al" parodies voice actor Katey Sagal's role as Peggy Bundy (with husband Al) on Married... with Children. The scene also lampoons the show's dysfunctional family sitcom style and marriage/sex related jokes.

In the beginning of the episode, when Bender opens the portal to the Internet, Fry's exclamation of "My God...it's full of ads!" is a reference to Dave Bowman's line "My God...it's full of stars!" in the novel 2001: A Space Odyssey and the film 2010. As the portal opens, the characteristic theme "Also Sprach Zarathustra" from 2001: A Space Odyssey plays.

Alcazar's story of Cyclopia's demise also parodies Superman's origin story, in which his father sends him in an experimental vessel to travel through hyperspace before their home planet Krypton is destroyed.

One of the alien women that Alcazar is pledged to is a member of the Great Race of Yith from H. P. Lovecraft's The Shadow out of Time.

The name Cineplex 14 is a spoof of the Canadian company Cineplex Entertainment. When the popcorn is thrown into the sun, it makes a shape of a galaxy, the logo of Galaxy Cinemas, one of the companies that merged to make Cineplex Entertainment.

== Broadcast and reception ==
In its initial airing, the episode received a Nielsen rating of 4.0/7, placing it 86th among primetime shows for the week of March 13–19, 2000.

Color stylist Bari Kumar won an Emmy award for Outstanding Individual Achievement in Animation for this episode in 2000. Susie Dietter was nominated for an Annie Award in 2000 for "Outstanding Individual Achievement for Directing in an Animated Television Production" for this episode; she lost to Brian Sheesley for the Futurama episode "Why Must I Be a Crustacean in Love?". In Doug Pratt's DVD, Pratt noted that this episode was his favorite of the second season. In particular, he notes that the virtual reality sequence at the beginning was very witty and the overall plot was entertaining.

The A.V. Club gave this episode an A, stating "The character work is strong in this one, the story is well-paced and entertaining throughout, and it's consistently funny from beginning to end."
