= Louden =

Louden may refer to:

- Louden, New Jersey, unincorporated community
- Louden, Ohio, unincorporated community
- R. Bruce and May W. Louden House, listed on the National Register of Historic Places in Jefferson County, Iowa
- R. B. and Lizzie L. Louden House, Fairfield, Iowa
- Louden Machinery Company, American engineering, manufacturing and design company

== People with the name ==
- Bill Louden or "Baldy" (1883–1935), American baseball player
- George Louden (1885–1972), British cricketer
- James Keith Louden (1905–1994), American industrial engineer
- LeRoy Louden (born 1936), American politician in Nebraska
- Lou Louden (1919–1989), American baseball player
- Margaret Louden (1910–1998), British surgeon
- Michael Louden (1964–2004), American actor
- Robert Louden (died 1867), Confederate messenger in the American Civil War
- Sharon Louden (born 1964), American artist
- Louden Ryan (1923–2018), Irish economist and academic
- Louden Swain, fictional character in American film Vision Quest

== See also ==
- Loudon (disambiguation)
- Loudoun, parish in East Ayrshire, Scotland
