= The Honking =

- Futurama episode
- Episode no.: Season 2 Episode 18
- Directed by: Susie Dietter
- Written by: Ken Keeler
- Production code: 2ACV18
- Original air date: November 5, 2000

Episode features
- Opening caption: Smell-O-Vision Users Insert Nostril Tubes Now
- Opening cartoon: "Bold King Cole" (1936)

Episode chronology
← Previous "War Is the H-Word"	Next → "The Cryonic Woman"
- Futurama season 2

"The Honking" is the eighteenth and penultimate episode in the second season of the American animated television series Futurama, and the 31st episode of the series overall. It originally aired on the Fox network in the United States on November 5, 2000. The episode references the 1977 film The Car.

== Plot ==
As part of his late uncle Vladimir's last will, Bender must spend the night in his family's sinister old castle near Thermostadt, the capital of the Robo-Hungarian Empire, in order to inherit it. However, the castle's holographic "robot ghosts" cause him to flee out into the night, where he is run over by a mysterious non-hover car.

After returning to New New York, Bender begins to experience nightmares and blackouts, and believes that the car has followed him home. In the city, mysterious tire tracks are discovered at places where Bender has been. Worried, he seeks "professional help" from a coin-operated Gypsy Bot machine. It informs him that he was run over by a "werecar", the robotic equivalent of a werewolf, and has thus become one himself. He is cursed to keep running people over and eventually kill his best friend. The only thing that can lift the curse is the destruction of the original werecar. That night, Bender indeed transforms into a coupe and goes after Leela. This angers Fry, who takes it as a sign that Bender does not consider him to be his best friend.

After narrowly surviving Bender's nocturnal rampage, the crew returns to the village near Vladimir's castle. From there, they follow a trail of various bizarre werecars, until they ultimately find the original werecar: Project Satan, a demonic car built a thousand years earlier from parts of the most evil cars in history.

Bender once again transforms, and this time goes after Fry, which overjoys him as he sees it as proof that he is Bender's best friend after all. Project Satan accidentally drives into a large furnace, destroying himself and lifting the curse. A back to normal Bender grieves upon apparently killing Fry, but is relieved when Fry emerges from his compartment alive and admits he is grateful for their friendship. However, Bender strangles Fry for taking his last beer.

== Production ==
Calculon's claim that he was all of "history's greatest acting robots" is a subtle reference to the immortal Mr. Flint from the Star Trek: The Original Series episode "Requiem for Methuselah".

The visual design for Bender as a were-car directly references the titular antagonist from The Car.

== Reception ==
In Doug Pratt's DVD Pratt noted that this episode had an "extremely witty plot turn".

Zack Handlen of The A.V. Club gave the episode a B+, stating, "There are plenty of nifty ideas in 'The Honking.' I was especially fond of the ultimate source of the were-car problem, a murderous vehicle built by a group of scientists for Project Satan. Only thing is, Project Satan doesn't become relevant until the last five minutes or so of the episode, which is a problem throughout; all the cleverness keeps things moving, but the end result is something that's no more (but no less) than the sum of its various parts."
