= Put Your Head on My Shoulders =

- Futurama episode
- Episode no.: Season 2 Episode 7
- Directed by: Chris Loudon
- Written by: Ken Keeler
- Production code: 2ACV07
- Original air date: February 13, 2000

Episode features
- Opening caption: Not Based On the Novel by James Fenimore Cooper
- Opening cartoon: Little Lulu in "Chick and Double Chick" (1946)

Episode chronology
| ← Previous "The Lesser of Two Evils" | Next → "Raging Bender" |
- Futurama season 2

"Put Your Head On My Shoulders" is the seventh episode of the second season of the American animated television series Futurama. It originally aired on the Fox network in the United States on February 13, 2000. The episode was written by Ken Keeler and directed by Chris Loudon. "Put Your Head on My Shoulders" is a Valentine's Day special. In the episode, Fry and Amy enter a short-lived romance. After a car crash, Fry's head is temporarily grafted onto Amy's body.

== Plot ==
Amy goes car shopping, accompanied by Fry, Leela, and Bender. Against Leela's advice, Amy buys an expensive Beta Romeo (Note: Play on Alfa-Romeo) hovercar above the listed price. Later, Fry asks Leela to be his date for Valentine's Day because neither of them has a date. Leela scoffs at the idea that she can't find a date. Amy invites them to fly to Mercury in her new hovercar, and Fry joins her. The hovercar quickly runs out of fuel, and the two bond while waiting for a towtruck. They have sex while the hovercar is towed. The two begin an office romance, inspiring jealousy in Leela.

Meanwhile, in anticipation of Valentine's Day, Bender sets up a computer dating service. He charges each participant $500 and pretends to match them with an ideal partner. Customers include Leela and Zapp Brannigan.

Amy invites Fry to go to Jupiter's moon Europa on a date. However, Fry has tired of Amy and feels she wants to spend too much time together. He invites Zoidberg along so he doesn't have to be alone with her. They drive the hovercar Europa in awkward silence while Zoidberg noisily eats their picnic lunch in the backseat. Amy and Fry start arguing, and Fry asks Zoidberg to drive so they can talk. While Fry is preparing to break up with Amy, Zoidberg crashes the hovercar. Fry is badly injured, and Zoidberg surgically attaches his head to Amy's shoulder. Once they return to Earth, Zoidberg explains that it will take a few days to repair Fry's body. Fry breaks up with Amy, citing his concern that they've been spending too much time together. Amy is disappointed, but then quickly finds another date. Fry asks Leela to go out with him, but she declines. Fry then goes to Bender's dating service.

Amy and her date go to Elzar's Fine Cuisine for Valentine's Day with Fry as a third wheel. Bender arrives escorting an older woman, Petunia, to be Fry's date. Leela is in the same restaurant with her date, as is everyone else who used Bender's dating service. Petunia leaves to catch the bus to Nutley, New Jersey, and most of the other restaurant-goers also leave. Bender admits that he found all of their dates at the bus station. At the same time, Fry worries that Amy is about to leave and have sex with her date. Leela realizes Fry's predicament and distracts Amy's date by asking him about his career, much to Amy's disappointment.

Later, Fry's head is reattached to his own body. He and Amy reconnect as friends. Leela tells Fry that she enjoyed spending Valentine's Day with him.

== Reception ==
7.94 million American viewers saw "Put Your Head on My Shoulders" when it first aired. Zack Handlen reviewed the episode for The A.V. Club, describing it as "eh." His review is critical of Fry's rudeness toward Amy and the fact that he faces very few consequences. He also argues that Amy is used as a prop to further Fry and Leela's romantic storyline with little regard to her own characterization. Lenny Burnham compares the different romantic pairings in the episode, favoring Fry and Leela.
