= Margaret Louden =

British surgeon

- Born: 6 April 1910; Palmers Green, London
- Died: 11 December 1998 (aged 88)
- Occupation: Surgeon

Margaret Mary Crawford Louden FRCS (6 April 1910 – 11 December 1998) was a British surgeon. Her treatment for Crush Syndrome saved hundreds of people dug out from the buildings damaged from The Blitz bombings, while she was serving as consultant surgeon at the South London Hospital for Women and Children.

== Education ==
Born in Palmers Green, in North London, she attended Princess Helena School in Dulwich and St Paul's Girls' School from September 1924 to July 1928. During her time at SPGS she organised history competitions, captained cricket and hockey teams while also showing talent for music and art. In 1928, she entered the London School of Medicine for Women, with exhibitions (scholarships) from St Dunstan's Foundation, London University and St Paul's School. She qualified as a surgeon in 1934, winning prizes for obstetrics.

== Guy's Hospital ==
Louden worked as a registrar at Guy's Hospital under Sir Heneage Ogilvie where she was "confident in her ability and ambition". She wrote letters for The Lancet; in one she claimed that there was no intake of women students into the big teaching hospitals because of discrimination, although she had not experienced any personally. Between 1931 and 1939, 30 women doctors became Fellows of the Royal Colleges of Surgeons (FRCS); Louden was one of only six who became consultants in general surgery.

== South London Hospital for Women and Children ==
In 1934 she passed her MB BS and won prizes for obstetrics. Four years later Louden became a Fellow of the Royal College of Surgeons and a consultant at the South London Hospital for Women and Children, which was staffed only by female doctors. She wrote that there was a lot of discrimination against married women but "married, although she was, again she didn't feel it" but she described anti-discrimination as "boloney and counter-productive". Her ethics were based on hard work and she said "experience is everything in medicine and every reduction of working hours reduces the chances of gaining it".

== Crush Syndrome ==
When German mass air attacks in London started in earnest from September 1940 there were several cases of civilians being extricated from ruined buildings without apparent external injury only for them to collapse and die a few days later. It appeared that the victims had uraemia, a condition that Louden had encountered when treating patients taken to the South London Hospital for Women and Children. During World War II, Louden treated casualties including soldiers, pilots and civilians, describing Crush Syndrome and its treatment but she did not write up her work which meant her notable contribution was forgotten. In 1943, a Ministry of Health memo from Francis Fraser advised patients to drink large amounts of sodium bicarbonate to treat Crush Syndrome but the fluid solution was often administered too late. In 1944, Louden treated a woman aged 44 who had been pinned down in her house by her legs, giving her one and a half pints of fluid before she was dug out and admitted. The patient's leg continued to swell, reaching its peak on the 11th and 12th days but because Louden administered the solution before the woman was excavated, she recovered and within a year her only remaining symptoms were some numbness and a loss of power.

Louden's early-administering technique was used to save many lives in the subsequent Baedeker raids. After the war it became recognised that renal failure might similarly be due to the manner in which the weight of the unconscious body had acted upon muscles, as was also the case in carbon monoxide poisoning. However, it was not until this 1944 case was described in the British Medical Journal in 1990 by Eric Bywaters, a doctor who had been present, that Louden's contribution became known.

== Other wartime endeavours ==
In 1944, Louden was featured in the Evening Standard during a cooking demonstration; she complained that a caption had misquoted her as saying that she thought that cooking was harder than being a surgeon.

Louden treated Sir James Martin, the inventor of the ejector seat, after he was injured in a fight, and they became friends with Louden advising the engineer on the effects of ejection on the skeleton. Louden was described as "unfazed by crises, always prepared to take on cases others had abandoned as hopeless but only operated when absolutely essential".

== Closure of South London Hospital for Women and Children ==
For 30 years after World War II, Louden devoted herself to the South London Hospital for Women and Children. The hospital was closed in 1984, after a nine-month sit-in, because it was seen as too small compared to St James' Hospital, Balham (550 beds) and the rebuilt St George's Hospital in Tooting, even though it was the largest of the country's women's hospitals. Louden left in 1975 to work part-time at the Elizabeth Garrett Anderson Hospital but she campaigned for the South London Hospital for Women and Children to be kept open. It took 40 police officers to break the nine-month sit-in at the hospital and it remained boarded up for two decades before conversion and the rear/basement given over to further flats and a Tesco supermarket.

== Personal life and death ==
Louden married Derek Martin, the museum curator of Great Ormond Street Hospital, in 1937. They had two daughters. In 1962, she married Bernard Simpson, a consultant engineer.

Louden died aged 88 on 11 December 1998, leaving two daughters by her first marriage and three grandchildren.
