= The Problem with Popplers =

- Futurama episode
- Episode no.: Season 2 Episode 15
- Directed by: Chris Sauvé; Gregg Vanzo
- Story by: Darin Henry; Patric M. Verrone
- Teleplay by: Patric M. Verrone
- Production code: 2ACV15
- Original air date: May 7, 2000

Guest appearances
- Phil Hendrie as Free Waterfall Jr.

Episode features
- Opening caption: For External Use Only
- Opening cartoon: "Up to Mars" (1930)

Episode chronology
| ← Previous "Mother's Day" | Next → "Anthology of Interest I" |
- Futurama season 2

"The Problem with Popplers" is the fifteenth episode in the second season of the American animated television series Futurama, and the 28th episode of the series overall. It originally aired on the Fox network in the United States on May 7, 2000. The title is a reference to the Star Trek: The Original Series episode "The Trouble with Tribbles". The episode focuses on the Planet Express crew discovering what they think is fast food they call "Popplers," but they turn out to be the young of the Omicron aliens, and the Omicronian leader Lrrr seeks revenge.

== Plot ==
After delivering to the Moocher Homeworld, the Planet Express crew find that their store rooms have been raided. They land on a planet in search of food, finding that it abounds in a delicious edible life-form, which they call "Popplers." The highly addictive "Popplers" soon inspire a new business venture for the crew. However, after Popplers become an incredibly popular food item and the organization MEAT (Mankind for Ethical Animal Treatment) begins to protest against them, it is learned that they are the larval stage of the Omicronian race, and that the planet where they came from is one of the nursery planets of the Omicronians.

Leela, the first to discover this when a Poppler awakens in her hands, leads the charge to stop the eating of Popplers. This mostly fails, partly due to Bender's subversive actions. The warlike natives of Omicron Persei 8, led by Lrrr, arrive to seek justice for humans devouring billions of their young. The Omicronians demand that they be allowed to eat the same number of Earthlings as of "Popplers" that had been eaten. Since there are fewer humans on Earth than the number of Popplers that were eaten, and since Lrrr filled up on nuts during the negotiations, the Omicronians choose instead to eat the first Earthling to eat their young: Leela.

In order to fool the Omicronians, Zapp Brannigan brings a female orangutan dressed and styled as Leela. The Omicronians are initially fooled because they have difficulty recognizing individual humans; however, hippie Free Waterfall Junior exposes the sham to protect "one of Mother Earth's most precious creatures". After realizing the trick, and after Ndnd eats the orangutan, Lrrr demands the real Leela. With Leela in Lrrr's mouth, the small Omicronian, Jrrr, whom Leela had been nannying since birth, arrives. Jrrr jumps into Leela's mouth and convinces the Omicronians that it is wrong to eat other intelligent life out of revenge. The Omicronians leave, but not before Lrrr devours Waterfall Junior. The amount of drugs in Waterfall's system leads to Lrrr becoming stoned.

The episode ends with the Planet Express Crew eating a smorgasbord buffet of unintelligent animals, including a suckling pig and a dolphin who wasted all his money on instant-lottery tickets.

== Reception ==
The episode was ranked number eleven on IGN's top 25 episode list, particularly noting its great premise. In Doug Pratt's DVD Pratt called the episode "original and inspired". The A.V. Club gave the episode an A.

== Usages of the name ==
The PDF library Poppler is named after the lifeform in this episode.
