= A Clone of My Own =

- Futurama episode
- Episode no.: Season 2 Episode 10
- Directed by: Rich Moore
- Written by: Patric M. Verrone
- Production code: 2ACV10
- Original air date: April 9, 2000

Episode features
- Opening caption: Coming Soon To An Illegal DVD
- Opening cartoon: "Ko-Ko Needles the Boss" (1927)

Episode chronology
← Previous "A Bicyclops Built for Two"	Next → "How Hermes Requisitioned His Groove Back"
- Futurama season 2

"A Clone of My Own" is the tenth episode in the second season of the American animated television series Futurama, and the 23rd episode of the series overall. It originally aired on the Fox network in the United States on April 9, 2000. It marks the first appearance of the recurring character Cubert Farnsworth.

== Plot ==
Professor Farnsworth receives word from Mars University that they are revoking his professorship. When he arrives before the university's professors, he discovers his crew is actually throwing him a surprise party celebrating his 150th birthday. After seeing a short film summarizing his life, Farnsworth becomes concerned with his own mortality, and decides to name a successor. The Planet Express staff each expects one of them will be named, but Farnsworth reveals that his successor will be a 12-year-old clone of himself, Cubert Farnsworth.

Cubert decides that being an inventor is not an appealing career choice. He makes cutting remarks about Farnsworth and his inventions, which include a time travel machine and a translator which turns words into an incomprehensible, dead language (French), and the engines of the planet express ship, which Farnsworth claims to have learned to invent from a dream. A depressed Farnsworth makes a recording telling his crew that he has been lying about his age; he is actually 160, the age when robots from the Sunset Squad take people away, never to be seen again. Under cover of a thunderstorm, a Grim Reaper-like hooded robot arrives and takes Farnsworth away in a hearse-type hover car.

The crew set off to rescue Farnsworth, and find the Near-Death Star, the Sunset Squad's base of operations. The crew sneak in with Fry dressed up as Farnsworth, with Cubert on his back posing as a hump to make him look "old", carrying a jar full of Cubert's blood as a DNA sample. They locate the professor, who is unconscious and hooked to a life-support system. The robots discover the crew, who then race back to the Planet Express Ship, Farnsworth in tow.

As they reach the landing pad Cubert is knocked unconscious, but they make it onto the ship in one piece. When the ship takes off, the robots open fire, damaging the engines. A reawakened Cubert announces that he knows how to fix the engines, having learned how to from a dream, and the crew make their escape. Safely back on Earth, Cubert tells Farnsworth that he has decided to follow in his footsteps.

== Broadcast and reception ==
In its initial airing, the episode placed 84th in the Nielsen ratings for primetime shows for the week of April 3–9, 2000.

The A.V. Club gave this episode a B+, stating "As is, Qbert’s boringness is, while far from fatal, still pretty boring. His shift from This is stupid and doesn’t make any sense to Anything is possible! doesn’t make a lot of sense."
