= Won't You Pimai Neighbor? =

- King of the Hill episode
- Episode no.: Season 4 Episode 18
- Directed by: Boohwan Lim; Kyounghee Lim
- Written by: John Altschuler; Dave Krinsky
- Production code: 4ABE18
- Original air date: March 19, 2000

Guest appearance
- Soon-Tek Oh as The Monk

Episode chronology
← Previous "Bill of Sales"	Next → "Hank's Bad Hair Day"
- King of the Hill season 4

"Won't You Pimai Neighbor?" is the 18th episode of the fourth season of the American animated television series King of the Hill, and the 78th episode of the series overall. Written by John Altschuler and Dave Krinsky and directed by Boohwan Lim and Kyounghee Lim, it originally aired on the Fox network in the United States on March 19, 2000. The name of the episode alludes to the theme song of the public television series Mr. Rogers' Neighborhood, "Won't You Be My Neighbor?"

== Plot ==
Hosting a neighborhood Pimai party to celebrate the beginning of the Laotian lunar year, Kahn soon learns that a group of Buddhist monks is searching for the reincarnated lama Sanglug in the vicinity of Arlen. The monks are planning to attend the party and test the two most likely candidates, Chane Wassonasong and Connie Souphanousinphone.

At the party, a number of objects, one of which belonged to Sanglug, are laid out on a rug for the candidates to choose from, the idea being that Sanglug's reincarnated spirit will be drawn to the object he had possessed. In an attempt to distract Chane and give Connie first pick, Bobby picks up a cane from the rug and does an impromptu soft shoe dance. The cane is in fact the object that Sanglug had possessed, and the monks are awed by the possibility that Bobby may be the reincarnated lama. The monks decide that one of them should stay behind with the Souphanousinphones while the others make preparations for a further test. Peggy revels in the attention that Bobby begins receiving, but Hank disapproves of the entire matter, believing Buddhism to be "hooey". Meanwhile, the monk who stayed behind notices that some of Bobby's mannerisms bear striking similarities to those exhibited by Sanglug, reinforcing the idea that he may indeed be the reincarnated lama, and gives Bobby some books about Buddhism to read. Bobby begins to offer pieces of transcendental advice that usually prove helpful to the situations at hand; however, he soon admits that he does not understand either Buddhism or Methodism, the faith in which he has been raised, very well after an indignant Hank discovers him meditating in his room. Hank begins to fear that Bobby is abandoning the family's Christian beliefs, and to his dismay, finds no help from Reverend Stroup, who thinks that Bobby's use of Buddhism to strengthen his spirituality is fine since Bobby still loves Jesus.

As the date of the second test approaches, Bobby and Connie are dismayed to learn that if he truly is the lama, he will have to take a vow of celibacy. Bobby is ready to refuse to take the test or deliberately fail it, but Connie tells him that she will not feel right dating him unless he makes an honest effort, in case he really is Sanglug. Kahn, initially displeased that Bobby could be the new lama, is overjoyed by this and hopes that he passes. The night before the test, a despondent Bobby tries meditation and prayer to figure out what to do about the test, since he is unwilling to part ways with Connie; Hank, meanwhile, prays at his own bedside for Bobby to fail the test.

When the test day arrives, a senior monk shows Bobby a new group of items laid out on a rug and asks him to choose any one item that he sees on it. Among the objects is a mirror, and Bobby, seeing Connie's face reflected in it, chooses her. Despite Kahn's objections, the monk declares that the choice was a valid one and that Bobby is not the lama. After the others leave, however, a junior monk notes that the mirror was the correct item, and that Bobby had at least used it despite not choosing it outright. "Tough call," the senior monk admits, "but it's mine and I made it."

== Depiction of Buddhism ==
The monks depicted in this episode seem to belong to the Tibetan Vajrayana tradition; they are referred to as "lama" and their leader "the Rinpoche", the mantra Bobby chants is Om Mani Padme Hum which is also chanted by Tibetan Buddhist practitioners, and the search for the reincarnation of the Lama Sanglung seems to be a reference to the Tibetan tulku tradition. By contrast, Laos (and presumably the Souphanousinphone family as Laotians) belongs to the Theravada Buddhist tradition, which makes use of neither the title of "lama" for monks nor of the practice of identifying reincarnated spiritual leaders. The episode makes it clear that Kahn is not terribly concerned with the religious aspects and is primarily interested in social clout, saying "Yeah, yeah, Buddhist, whatever. Monks!"

== Reception ==
The episode was shown at the "International Buddhist Film Festival", which praised its "good writing and fearless satire". It also was nominated for the Annie Awards for directing.
