= The Lesser of Two Evils =

- Futurama episode
- Episode no.: Season 2 Episode 6
- Directed by: Chris Sauvé
- Written by: Eric Horsted
- Production code: 2ACV06
- Original air date: February 20, 2000

Guest appearance
- Bob Barker as himself

Episode features
- Opening caption: The Show that Watches Back
- Opening cartoon: "Felix the Cat Trifles with Time" (1925)

Episode chronology
← Previous "Why Must I Be a Crustacean in Love?"	Next → "Put Your Head on My Shoulders"
- Futurama season 2

"The Lesser of Two Evils" is the sixth episode in the second season of the American animated television series Futurama, and the 19th episode of the series overall. It originally aired on the Fox Network in the United States on February 20, 2000. It received generally mixed reception from critics.

== Plot ==
While visiting the Past-o-rama theme park, Fry runs over a robot with an uncanny resemblance to Bender. They bring him back to the Planet Express building, where Professor Farnsworth repairs him. The robot's name is Flexo, and like Bender, he is a bending unit. The only physical difference between the two is that Flexo has a goatee. Bender and Flexo hit it off, but Flexo soon begins to annoy Fry, who suspects him of being evil, despite his behavior being similar to Bender's.

The Professor reveals an atom of the fictional element Jumbonium, which the crew is to deliver to the Miss Universe pageant on Tova 9. Due to the value of the atom, the Professor hires Flexo as additional security. Leela assigns Bender, Flexo and Fry shifts guarding the atom, but when Fry's shift comes up, he falls asleep due to staying up during all of Flexo's shift, and the atom is stolen. Fry not only suspects Flexo, but believes he has disguised himself as Bender. After Bender re-establishes his identity, Fry, Leela, and Bender head off to inform pageant host Bob Barker's head of the theft.

They burst into the contest in pursuit of Flexo, and he and Bender start to fight. At the end of the fight, Bender's chest cavity door is knocked open, revealing the atom. Flexo tells the crew members that he had seen Bender steal the atom and left to inform Barker.

With the atom recovered, and Flexo accidentally imprisoned for Bender's crime due to Barker's disinterest in his identity, the pageant concludes with a giant paramecium from Vega being crowned Miss Universe, only after Leela is mistakenly crowned first due to a miscommunication from judge Zapp Brannigan.

== Production ==
In the audio commentary of the episode, David X. Cohen states that this episode was the only one to which he gave his artistic input. When Fry, Bender, and Flexo are at a robot strip club, a robot stripper with a strange gear-oriented design can be seen. Cohen explains that he drew the robot himself and took great pride in doing so.

== Broadcast and reception ==
In its initial airing, the episode received a Nielsen rating of 4.4/8, placing it 87th among primetime shows for the week of February 14–20, 2000.

The A.V. Club gave the episode a B, stating "There’s a lot of solid laughs, which is really all Futurama needs to manage to keep me watching... Still, a great episode of this show should be more than just some clever ideas scribbled in the margins."
