= The Cryonic Woman =

- Futurama episode
- Episode no.: Season 2 Episode 19
- Directed by: Mark Ervin
- Written by: J. Stewart Burns
- Production code: 2ACV19
- Original air date: December 3, 2000

Guest appearances
- Pauly Shore as himself; Sarah Silverman as Michelle

Episode features
- Opening caption: Not a Substitute for Human Interaction
- Opening cartoon: "Up to Mars" (1930)

Episode chronology
| ← Previous "The Honking" | Next → "Amazon Women in the Mood" |
- Futurama season 2

"The Cryonic Woman" is the nineteenth episode and season finale in the second season of the American animated television series Futurama, and the 32nd episode of the series overall. It originally aired on the Fox network in the United States on December 3, 2000. The plot incorporates a cryonics theme. Sarah Silverman does the voice of Fry's on and off girlfriend Michelle (replacing Kath Soucie, who voiced the character in the pilot episode "Space Pilot 3000").

== Plot ==
Fry and Bender fly off with the Planet Express Ship, not realizing it is anchored by an unbreakable diamond tether. The building is dragged behind it, destroying a number of landmarks. Professor Farnsworth fires Fry and Bender, and Leela for leaving the keys in the ship.

Leela re-implants her and Fry's old career chips but mixes them up. Fry is hired for Leela's old cryogenics counselor job, while Leela is forced to be a delivery girl. Fry finds that Pauly Shore is frozen in a tube and thaws him out. Shore explains he was supposed to be thawed out in Hollywood for the 1000-year anniversary screening of Jury Duty II. Fry is shocked to find that the next person he greets is his old girlfriend, Michelle, who froze herself in 2000 after her life fell apart.

Fry introduces Michelle to the world of 3000, but she has problems adapting to the future. She convinces Fry to join her as she re-freezes herself for another thousand years. They awake in a post-apocalyptic wasteland with a green, polluted sky, joining a society of feral children armed with heavy weaponry. Though initially content to be a member of the society, at Michelle's nagging, Fry challenges the leader. Fry and the teen wage a "Deathboarding" street battle amongst freeways and armored cars battling one another with machine guns. Their battle ends when the children are picked up for Hebrew school by their mother. Confused by this new world and tired of Michelle's nagging, Fry leaves her, wandering through the desolate wilderness alone.

Fry spots signs of a city on the horizon. When he arrives, he finds himself standing in front of Grauman's Chinese Theater. The Planet Express ship lands nearby and the crew leaps out, glad to have found Fry. He and Michelle were only frozen for two days; the desolate wasteland is Los Angeles in the year 3000. Fry was in Pauly Shore's tube, and when the delivery crew discovered en route to Hollywood that Pauly Shore was not in the tube, they tossed it into a ditch. A limousine passes by, revealing that Michelle is now in a relationship with Pauly.

As the Planet Express ship flies home, Fry asks The Professor if he can have his job back. After being reminded by Bender of what happened earlier in the episode, The Professor drops Fry through a trap door.
