= Raging Bender =

- Futurama episode
- Episode no.: Season 2 Episode 8
- Directed by: Ron Hughart
- Written by: Lewis Morton
- Production code: 2ACV08
- Original air date: February 27, 2000

Guest appearances
- Rich Little as himself; Russ Leatherman as Mr. Moviefone

Episode features
- Opening caption: Nominated For Three Glemmys
- Opening cartoon: "Hollywood Capers" from Looney Tunes by Warner Bros. Cartoons (1935)

Episode chronology
← Previous "Put Your Head on My Shoulders"	Next → "A Bicyclops Built for Two"
- Futurama season 2

"Raging Bender" is the eighth episode in the second season of the American animated television series Futurama, and the 21st episode of the series overall. It originally aired on the Fox network in the United States on February 27, 2000. The episode was written by Lewis Morton and directed by Ron Hughart. The story focuses on Bender becoming a professional robot wrestler.

== Plot ==
At the morning Planet Express meeting, the crew discovers Hermes has been assimilated by the Brain Slugs. To avoid being assimilated themselves, the rest of the staff takes off for the movies.

While watching All My Circuits, The Movie, Bender picks a fight with a robot that turns out to be the Ultimate Robot Fighting champion The Masked Unit. The Masked Unit trips on Bender's oil-soaked popcorn, and is knocked out by the fall. Coincidentally, the commissioner of Ultimate Robot Fighting, Abner Doubledeal, is at the movie, and hires Bender on the spot.

After training with Leela, Bender has his first fight against a chainsaw-equipped robot called The Clearcutter. Seemingly by a stroke of luck, Bender defeats his opponent, causing The Clearcutter to explode into a pile of parts. However, Bender runs into the robot backstage, and the commissioner reveals that Ultimate Robot Fighting is fixed, and that the most popular robot always wins. Bender is shocked at first, but then celebrates the fact that he is popular.

Bender spurns further training from Leela, and proceeds to win several fights, but eventually, his popularity wanes, and he is told that he can either take a dive in his new role as 'The Gender Bender', or be killed by his giant opponent, Destructor. Bender asks Leela for help, but she initially refuses. When she discovers that Destructor is being trained by Arcturan kung-fu Master Fnog, she changes her mind. The misogynist Fnog had ruined Leela's dream of competing in the Arcturan Kung-fu junior championships years ago, and Leela still holds a grudge.

Bender tries to fight Destructor, but takes a merciless beating in the ring. He begs Fry to throw in the towel, but sees that Fry now has a Brain Slug on his head. Meanwhile, Leela discovers that Destructor is being controlled remotely (using motion capture and virtual reality) by Fnog, hidden beneath the ring. They proceed to fight, but just as Fnog is winning, Leela grabs his fist and forces it into the floor; when Destructor copies this move, his fist smashes through the canvas and knocks Fnog out. Destructor collapses on top of Bender, pinning him and winning the match. The flattened Bender receives a Bed Bath & Beyond discount card, and Fry and Leela roll him up and carry him home. Fry's Brain Slug is found on the arena floor, having starved to death.

== Production ==
According to the DVD commentary, Hermes was supposed to have the brain slug for the rest of the season. However, this idea was scrapped because everybody "just sort of forgot about it".

== Cultural references ==
When Fry, Bender, and Leela are riffing through the newsreel, they are ironically shushed by Crow T. Robot and Tom Servo from Mystery Science Theater 3000. The film's opening sequence is an homage to Maurice Binder's iconic James Bond gun barrel sequence.

Destructor's final blow to Bender's head is shot in black-and-white slow motion in a recreation of a famous shot from Raging Bull.

== Reception ==
The A.V. Club gave the episode a B+, stating "The story of Bender’s rise and fall in the fine art of (staged) Robot Wrestling is a time honored comedy tradition… “Raging Bender”’s conclusion is pretty much all silly… The subplot is the closest the episode comes to having a legitimate emotional component… Still, if you can put that aside, this is a solid episode. Leela kicks some ass, Bender gets crushed by a giant robot, and Fry starves a brain slug to death. So that’s cool."

== See also ==
- "Steel" (The Twilight Zone) and Real Steel, both based on the short story by Richard Matheson depict a scenario where robotic boxers have replaced human athletes but involve hidden human controllers.
