= Why Must I Be a Crustacean in Love? =

- Futurama episode
- Episode no.: Season 2 Episode 5
- Directed by: Brian Sheesley
- Written by: Eric Kaplan
- Production code: 2ACV05
- Original air date: February 6, 2000

Episode features
- Opening caption: From the network that brought you "The Simpsons"
- Opening cartoon: My Old Kentucky Home (1926)

Episode chronology
← Previous "Xmas Story"	Next → "The Lesser of Two Evils"
- Futurama season 2

"Why Must I Be a Crustacean in Love?" is the fifth episode in the second season of the American animated television series Futurama, and the 18th episode of the series overall. It originally aired on the Fox network in the United States on February 6, 2000. The episode is a parody of the Star Trek: The Original Series episode "Amok Time" and, in part, Cyrano de Bergerac.

== Plot ==
Amy and Leela drag Fry and Bender to the gym, and Dr. Zoidberg tags along. While at the gym, Zoidberg behaves erratically and aggressively, and even develops a head fin. Back at the laboratory, Professor Farnsworth examines a restrained Zoidberg, and determines that it is mating season for Zoidberg's species. The crew flies to Zoidberg's home planet, Decapod 10, and, after a short tour, Zoidberg sets up a mound on the beach and begins trying to attract a mate. He is rejected by numerous Decapodian women, especially Edna, an old classmate and former crush, leaving him very depressed.

Fry begins teaching Zoidberg how to win Edna's heart using human romance techniques. Zoidberg struggles to understand how this could work but he eventually gets the idea, and, using his new-found techniques, successfully woos Edna to a date. While at a restaurant, Leela reveals to Edna that Fry is responsible for the change in Zoidberg. Under the pretext of discussing Zoidberg, Edna invites Fry to her apartment and begins an unsuccessful attempt at seducing him, pinning him down until Zoidberg walks in and witnesses this. Enraged, he challenges Fry to Claw-Plach, a ritual fight to the death.

In the Claw-Plach arena, Fry is about to defeat Zoidberg, but cannot bring himself to kill his friend. A still incensed Zoidberg cuts Fry's arm off with his claw to teach him a lesson, prompting an astounded Fry to retaliate, proceeding to beat Zoidberg with his severed arm. After more fighting, Fry and Zoidberg look up to discover the entire Decapodian audience has left – including Edna, who has decided to mate with the king. Once every Decapodian is underwater, masses of eggs float to the surface after the mating frenzy of the species. However, it is revealed that Decapodians die after mating, and so Zoidberg's life was fortunately spared by his failure to secure a mate. He apologizes to Fry for attempting to kill him, and the two make amends. On the way home, Zoidberg tries to reattach Fry's severed arm, but in his effort to fix things, he inadvertently cuts off several of Fry's limbs as the credits roll.

== Broadcast and reception ==
In its initial airing, the episode received a Nielsen rating of 4.2/7, placing it 83rd among primetime shows for the week of January 31 – February 6, 2000. This was the first episode of Futurama to air on Sundays at 7 pm, having been moved there from its previous 8:30 pm slot in favor of Malcolm in the Middle. As a result, the audience for this episode dropped from a season-long average of 12 million viewers to 6.7 million viewers, at the time a series low.

Brian Sheesley won an Annie Award for "Outstanding Individual Achievement for Directing in an Animated Television Production" for this episode in 2000. The animatic for this episode is included on the Futurama volume two DVD. In Doug Pratt's DVD Pratt notes this as one of the stronger episodes of the second season because of its use of character humor and the extension of the jokes beyond simple gags. Zack Handlen of The A.V. Club gave the episode an A−, stating, "The episode has a stronger plot than 'Xmas Story', and the opportunity to get to know Zoidberg and his origins is a welcome one. And any episode that includes a fight scene where the show’s main character gets his arm cut off is a-okay by me."
