= Rich Moore =

American filmmaker

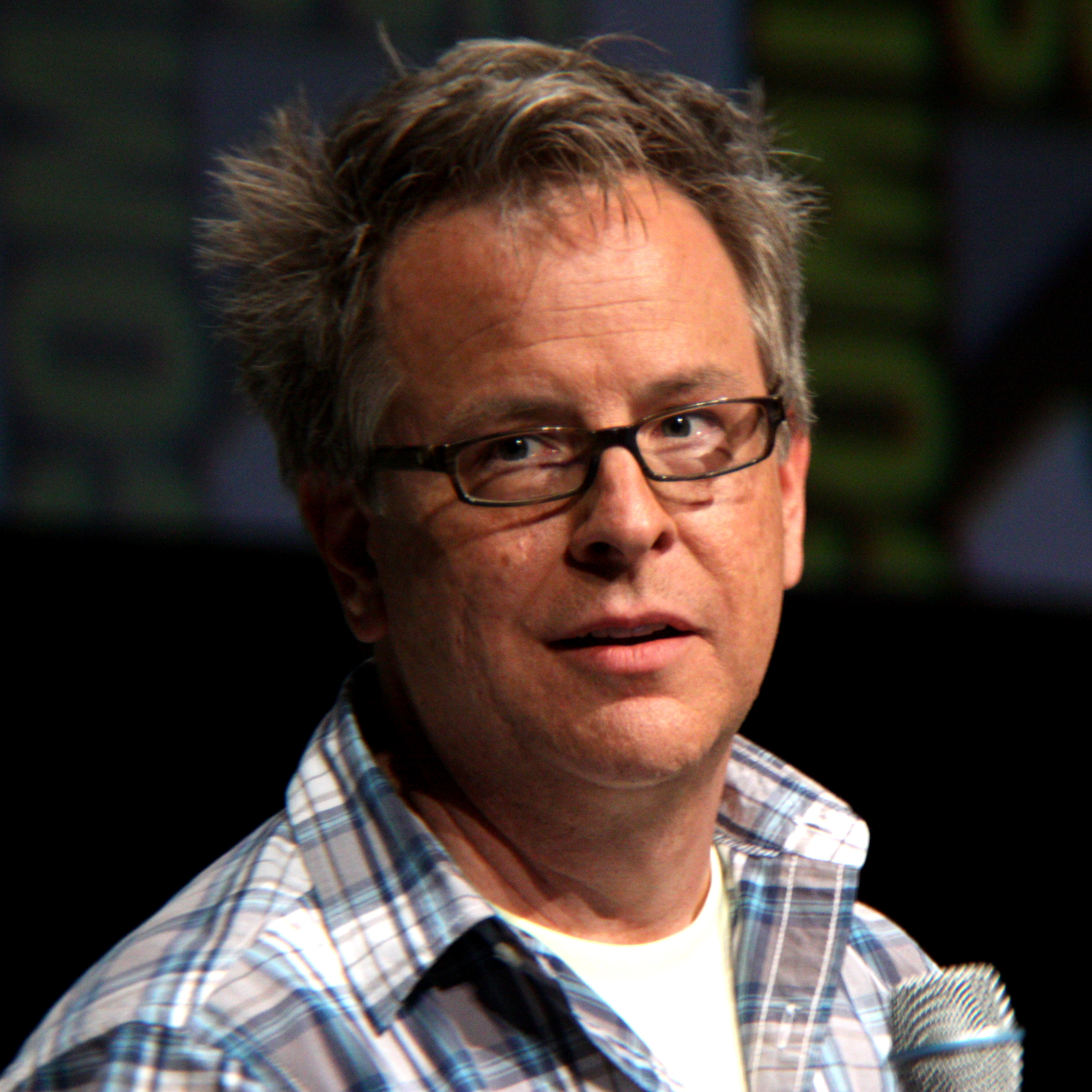
- Moore in 2012
- Born: 1962 or 1963 (age 63–64)
- Education: California Institute of the Arts (BFA)
- Occupations: Animation director; screenwriter; producer; voice actor
- Years active: 1986–present
- Employers: Klasky Csupo (1989–1992); Film Roman (1992–1995); Rough Draft Studios (1995–2008); Walt Disney Animation Studios (2008–2019); Sony Pictures Animation (2019–2022); Skydance Animation (2022–present)
- Notable work: The Simpsons; The Critic; Futurama; Wreck-It Ralph; Zootopia; Ralph Breaks the Internet

Rich Moore (born 1962 or 1963) is an American film and television animation director, screenwriter, producer and voice actor. He is best known for serving as a director on primetime animated television series such as The Simpsons, The Critic and Futurama as well as directing the films Wreck-It Ralph (2012), Zootopia (2016) and Ralph Breaks the Internet (2018) for Walt Disney Animation Studios. He is a two-time Emmy Award winner, a three-time Annie Award winner and an Academy Award winner.

== Early life ==
Moore grew up in Oxnard, California. He studied film and video at the California Institute of the Arts, graduating with a Bachelor of Fine Arts degree in 1987. While there, he narrated Jim Reardon's 1986 student film Bring Me the Head of Charlie Brown.

== Career ==
=== Television ===
After graduating from CalArts, Moore worked for Ralph Bakshi on CBS's Mighty Mouse: The New Adventures, co-writing all 13 season 1 episodes in 1987. Moore was one of the original three directors of The Simpsons, directing 17 episodes in the first 5 seasons from 1990 to 1993, including the episodes: "Flaming Moe's", "Itchy and Scratchy: The Movie", and "Marge vs. the Monorail". He won a 1991 Primetime Emmy Award for Outstanding Animated Program for The Simpsons: Homer vs. Lisa and the 8th Commandment, and later return as one of the sequence directors on The Simpsons Movie in 2007.

In 1994, Moore became a producer and supervising director for the animated series The Critic. He then oversaw the creative development and production of Futurama as the show's supervising director for its first four seasons. He also directed several episodes of the animated series from 1999 to 2001, including the classic "Roswell That Ends Well", for which he won the Emmy Award for Outstanding Animated Program.

Moore's other television animation directing credits include Comedy Central's Drawn Together and "Spy vs. Spy" for Mad TV. He served as supervising director on the 2009 animated Fox television series Sit Down, Shut Up.

=== Film ===
In 2004, Moore directed the Warner Bros. Animation animated short film Duck Dodgers in Attack of the Drones. In 2008, he was invited by John Lasseter to join Walt Disney Animation Studios as a director, with the suggestion that he develop a story set in the world of video games. This would become the 2012 animated feature Wreck-It Ralph, Moore's feature directing debut, and a box office and critical success. Moore also supplied the voices for the film's characters Sour Bill and Zangief. Wreck-It Ralph won five Annie Awards, including Best Animated Feature and a Best Director award for Moore, and was nominated for the Academy Award for Best Animated Feature.

Moore's next animated feature film was Disney's Zootopia, which he directed alongside Byron Howard and co-director Jared Bush. The film, released on March 4, 2016, became the second highest-grossing animated feature film of 2016 with a worldwide box office gross of over $1.023 billion. The film also won the Academy Award for Best Animated Feature.

After Zootopia, Moore returned to direct Ralph Breaks the Internet, the sequel to Wreck-It Ralph, with fellow filmmaker Phil Johnston. The film was a financial success, outgrossing the original film with over $529.3 million worldwide. It was also nominated for multiple awards in the Best Animated Feature category, including the Academy Awards, Annie Awards, and Golden Globe Awards.

On April 8, 2019, Moore revealed that he had left Disney to join Sony Pictures Animation, where he would direct and produce original animated films for the studio, and ultimately produced the film Vivo.

On March 16, 2022, Moore revealed that he has entered into an exclusive, multi-year overall deal with Skydance Animation. On October 18, 2023, it was revealed that Moore is directing an untitled Jack and the Beanstalk project at Skydance.

== Filmography ==
=== Films ===
Year	Title	Director	Story	Producer	Other	Voice Role	Notes
2007	The Simpsons Movie	No	No	No	Yes		Sequence Director
2007	Futurama: Bender's Big Score	No	No	Animation; Executive	No		Direct-to-video
2008	Dr. Seuss' Horton Hears a Who!	No	No	No	Yes		Additional Story Artist
2008	Futurama: The Beast with a Billion Backs	No	No	Animation; Executive	No		Direct-to-video
2008	Futurama: Bender's Game	No	No	Animation; Executive	No		Direct-to-video
2009	Futurama: Into the Wild Green Yonder	No	No	Animation; Executive	No		Direct-to-video
2012	Wreck-It Ralph	Yes	Yes	No	Yes	Sour Bill and Zangief	
2016	Zootopia	Yes	Yes	No	Yes	Doug Ramses and Larry	Creative Leadership
2018	Ralph Breaks the Internet	Yes	Yes	No	Yes	Sour Bill, Zangief and a Stormtrooper	Song Producer: "A Place Called Slaughter Race", Creative Leadership
2021	Vivo	No	No	Yes	Yes	Iguana	
2024	Spellbound	No	No	No	Yes	The Royal Postmaster	Additional Literary Materials
2026	Ray Gunn	No	No	No	Yes	Board Member Bill	Creative Leadership
TBA	Untitled Skydance Animation Jack and the Beanstalk project	Yes	TBA	TBA	TBA		

=== Shorts ===
Year	Title	Director	Story	Other	Role	Notes
1986	Somewhere in the Arctic	No	No	Yes	Dohk	
1986	Bring Me the Head of Charlie Brown	No	No	Yes	Charlie Brown / Narration	Aided and Abetted by
1986	Snookles	No	No	Yes	Dragon	Special Thanks
1988	Christmas in Tattertown	No	No	Yes		Character Color Designer
1988	Technological Threat	No	Yes	Yes		Character Animator, Designer
1989	Hound Town	No	No	Yes		Animation Director, Story Artist
1993	Inland Empire	No	No	Yes	Harper Brackman	
2004	Duck Dodgers in Attack of the Drones	Yes	No	No		
2009	The Affliction	No	No	Yes		Production Assistant
2013	Garlan Hulse: Where Potential Lives	Yes	No	Yes	Rich Moore	Himself
2024	Dust Monster	No	No	Yes		Special Thanks
2025	Flink's Pigeon Problems: A Magical Rescue	No	No	Yes	The Royal Postmaster (uncredited)	Special Thanks

Music video

Year	Title	Storyboard Artist
1991	"Deep, Deep Trouble"	Additional

=== Other credits ===
Year	Title	Role
1987	A Story	Thanks
2003	The Simpsons: Hit & Run	Special Thanks
2008	Bolt	Disney Story Trust – uncredited
2009	The Princess and the Frog	Disney Story Trust – uncredited
2010	Tangled	Disney Story Trust – uncredited
2011	Winnie the Pooh	Disney Story Trust – uncredited
2011	Gnomeo & Juliet	Deepest Gratitude
2013	Get a Horse!	Additional Thanks
2013	Frozen	Disney Story Trust – uncredited
2014	Feast	Special Thanks
2014	Big Hero 6	Creative Leadership
2016	Finding Dory	Special Thanks
2016	Inner Workings	Special Advisor
2016	Moana	Creative Leadership
2019	Frozen II	Creative Leadership

== Awards ==
Feature Films

Year	Title	Notes
2012	Wreck-It Ralph	Won Best Animated Feature at Annie Awards, Critics' Choice Movie Awards, National Board of Review Awards; Nominated for Academy Award for Best Animated Feature and Golden Globe Award for Best Animated Feature Film
2016	Zootopia	Won Best Animated Feature at Critics' Choice Movie Awards, Golden Globe Award for Best Animated Feature Film, Best Animated Feature at Annie Awards, Academy Award for Best Animated Feature; Nominated for BAFTA Award for Best Animated Film
2018	Ralph Breaks the Internet	Nominated for Best Animated Feature at Critics' Choice Movie Awards, Golden Globe Award for Best Animated Feature Film, Best Animated Feature at Annie Awards, Academy Award for Best Animated Feature

Emmy Awards

- 1991 – Outstanding Animated Program (Programming Less Than One Hour) for The Simpsons ("Homer vs. Lisa and the 8th Commandment")
- 2002 – Outstanding Animated Program (Programming Less Than One Hour) for Futurama ("Roswell That Ends Well")

Annie Awards

- 2002 – Directing in an Animated Television Production for Futurama ("Roswell That Ends Well")
- 2012 – Directing in an Animated Feature Production for Wreck-It Ralph
- 2016 – Directing in an Animated Feature Production for Zootopia (Shared with Byron Howard)

Academy Awards

- 2012 – Nominated: Academy Award for Best Animated Feature for Wreck-It Ralph
- 2016 – Academy Award for Best Animated Feature for Zootopia
- 2018 – Nominated: Academy Award for Best Animated Feature for Ralph Breaks the Internet

== Television directing credits ==
=== The Simpsons ===
- "The Telltale Head" (season 1, episode 8, original air date: February 25, 1990)
- "Homer's Night Out" (season 1, episode 10, March 25, 1990)
- "Simpson and Delilah" (season 2, episode 2, October 18, 1990)
- "Treehouse of Horror" (season 2, episode 3, October 25, 1990)
- "Dead Putting Society" (season 2, episode 6, November 15, 1990)
- "Homer vs. Lisa and the 8th Commandment" (season 2, episode 13, February 7, 1991)
- "Lisa's Substitute" (season 2, episode 19, April 25, 1991)
- "Stark Raving Dad" (season 3, episode 1, September 19, 1991)
- "Bart the Murderer" (season 3, episode 4, October 10, 1991)
- "Flaming Moe's" (season 3, episode 10, November 21, 1991)
- "Lisa the Greek" (season 3, episode 14, January 23, 1992)
- "Brother, Can You Spare Two Dimes?" (season 3, episode 24, August 27, 1992)
- "A Streetcar Named Marge" (season 4, episode 2, October 1, 1992)
- "Itchy & Scratchy: The Movie" (season 4, episode 6, November 3, 1992)
- "Marge vs. the Monorail" (season 4, episode 12, January 14, 1993)
- "The Front" (season 4, episode 19, April 15, 1993)
- "Cape Feare" (season 5, episode 2, October 7, 1993)

=== The Critic ===
- "Pilot" (season 1, episode 1, January 26, 1994)
- "Lady Hawke" (season 2, episode 3, March 19, 1995)
- "I Can't Believe It's a Clip Show" (season 2, episode 10, May 21, 1995)

=== Futurama ===
- "Space Pilot 3000" (co-directed with Gregg Vanzo) (season 1, episode 1, March 28, 1999)
- "Hell Is Other Robots" (season 1, episode 9, May 18, 1999)
- "A Clone of My Own" (season 2, episode 15, April 9, 2000)
- "Anthology of Interest I" (co-directed with Chris Loudon) (season 2, episode 20, May 21, 2000)
- "Roswell That Ends Well" (season 4, episode 1, December 9, 2001)

=== Baby Blues ===
- "Bizzy Moves In" (season 1, episode 2, July 28, 2000)

=== Drawn Together ===
- "Clum Babies" (season 2, episode 5, November 16, 2005)
- "Alzheimer's That Ends Well" (season 2, episode 14, March 8, 2006)
