= Chris Loudon =

American animator

- Born: January 30, 1967 (age 58)
- Occupation: Animator
- Years active: 1992–present

Chris Loudon (born January 30, 1967) is an American animator. He is credited for directing several episodes of the American science fiction sitcom television series Futurama.

== Directing credits ==
=== Futurama episodes ===
- "Put Your Head on My Shoulders"
- "Anthology of Interest I" (co-directed with Rich Moore)
- "The Luck of the Fryrish"
- "Time Keeps On Slippin'"
