= Zoidberg =

Fictional character in Futurama series

- Futurama character
- First appearance: "The Series Has Landed" (1999)
- Created by: Matt Groening; David X. Cohen
- Designed by: Matt Groening
- Voiced by: Billy West

In-universe information
- Full name: John A. Zoidberg
- Species: Decapodian
- Gender: Male
- Occupation: Staff doctor at the Planet Express delivery company.
- Significant others: Candy; Marianne
- Relatives: Harold Zoid (uncle); Leela (adopted sister)
- Origin: Decapod 10

Zoidberg, full name Dr. John A. Zoidberg, is a fictional character from the American animated series Futurama.

He is a Decapodian, a crustacean-like species of alien only found on the planet Decapod 10, most similar to a lobster. He works as the staff doctor for Planet Express, despite his woeful understanding of human physiology and questionable credentials. His character sharply contrasts with the typical image of a doctor as a wealthy and respected professional. He is shown to be incompetent when it comes to basic human anatomy and performing surgeries. He lives in a dumpster near the Planet Express building.

Zoidberg is voiced by Billy West, who performs the character with a Yiddish-inflected accent inspired by actors George Jessel and Lou Jacobi.

== Character creation ==
Zoidberg is named after an Apple II game that series writer David X. Cohen created in high school called Zoid, similar to the game Qix. The game was rejected by the software company Broderbund. One of Cohen's inspirations for the character of Dr. Zoidberg was that Star Trek character Leonard McCoy, the ship's doctor, frequently administered medical treatment to aliens such as Spock, so Cohen wished human characters in Futurama to be in the uneasy situation of being treated by an alien doctor.

During the first season, jokes about Zoidberg usually focused on his poor understanding of human anatomy and the fact that all of his co-workers hate him. Despite his incompetence, he believes that he is really an expert on human anatomy, and will blithely attempt to treat human patients as he would his own species. One of his running traits is his pronunciation of the word "robot", pronouncing it /ˈroʊbət/ ROH-bət rather than /ˈroʊbɒt/ ROH-bot. His use of English grammar and idioms resembles the stereotypical speech of Jewish people living in the northeastern United States, and elements of Jewish humor, and playful reversals on it, are a theme. As the series progressed, the writers gradually introduced themes that Zoidberg is poor, homeless, friendless, smelly, undignified, and repulsive—the opposite of a stereotypical doctor, who is usually respectable, wealthy, and romantically desirable. In front of others, Zoidberg frequently pretends to be refined and successful, though this illusion is quickly dashed when pointed out. Regardless of his flaws, Zoidberg is good-natured and means well, and will help the crew when the situation calls for it.

== Biography ==
Zoidberg is the company doctor at Planet Express. He is the adopted brother of Turanga Leela. Although he claims to be an expert in human medicine, particularly internal medicine, his knowledge of human anatomy and physiology is practically nonexistent. He is unable to tell the difference between robots and humans (or human males and females), believes food is digested in the heart, and that humans have multiple mouths and a dorsal fin. His only knowledge of humans seems to come from television advertisements, although his skills as a physician generally vary: in "Put Your Head on My Shoulders" he manages to successfully transplant Fry's head onto Amy's body after Fry's body incurs massive trauma in a vehicular accident, that he caused, that requires extensive repair, but in Into the Wild Green Yonder he incorrectly declares Fry dead only for him to wake up a few seconds later. In Bender's Big Score, he performs several limb reattachments to moderate success. It may be assumed that advances in medical technology have made limb and head reattachment a simple process, as in Bender's Big Score head reattachment is shown to be little more than applying a paste to the area and placing the head back on (a process that works even if the head is on backwards, as shown). In "Parasites Lost", he comes to the conclusion that Fry, who is frequently injured, is a hypochondriac, an accusation he makes when Fry sits before Zoidberg with a pipe through his chest. He claims to be an MD, but states, unconvincingly, in "A Clone of My Own" that he lost his medical degree in a volcano. However, he later states in "The Duh-Vinci Code" that his PhD is in art history (as opposed to medicine). Other intimations to his dubious medical training include the episode "Teenage Mutant Leela's Hurdles", in which he comments, "I'm no robot doctor, but this machine guy could really use a lozenge." Although he is shown to be incompetent at treating humans, the episode "The Tip of the Zoidberg" shows he is a competent doctor for alien species, such as the Yeti. In the episode, Professor Farnsworth says he is an expert in alien physiology. There are also frequent mentions throughout the series that he has good medical knowledge regarding his own species, for example in the episode "Why Must I Be a Crustacean in Love?" he talks about fin rot, which is a real disease that affects fish.

Despite his career as a physician, Zoidberg is repeatedly identified as living in poverty, lonely and desperate for friendship and attention. The crew are often disgusted by his foul habits, such as squirting ink or eating from trash cans, though he is mostly oblivious to their true feelings about him, having referred to Hermes Conrad and Bender as friends. Dr. Zoidberg also seems outgoing and unaware of dangerous situations, for example when Roberto tries to escape the cops with a knife at Dr. Zoidberg’s throat, Roberto asks “Can’t a guy drop in on old friends?!?” To which Zoidberg replies “I’m good! And you?” Hermes seems to have the most intense dislike of Zoidberg, seeing him as even more expendable than the rest of the crew. However, when Fry reads Hermes' mind in Into the Wild Green Yonder, it is revealed that Hermes sees him as "pathetic but lovable". In "The Six Million Dollar Mon", after Hermes quits Planet Express and trades his own body parts for robot parts, a depressed Zoidberg recovers the discarded parts and sews them together to create a full-fledged ventriloquist dummy of Hermes, which he later uses to transplant Hermes' brain out of his robot body and back into his original body. After Hermes thanks him and admits that they had never been friends, Zoidberg callously calls out Hermes for his treatment of him, leaving Hermes impressed with this confrontation. Zoidberg briefly becomes a hero when he saves Earth from enslavement to his own kind in "A Taste of Freedom". Fry and Professor Farnsworth are usually the only ones to refer to Zoidberg as a friend, and in Bender's Big Score, Zoidberg says of Fry, "He was the only one of you who never struck me!" during the latter's memorial. Zoidberg has ambitions to be a stand-up comedian, but he is entirely unsuccessful at this endeavor. In "That's Lobstertainment!", his uncle, the silent hologram star Harold Zoid (a parody of Harold Lloyd), advises him to give up on comedy and finance a film whose script Zoid is writing.

The reason that the Professor continues to employ Zoidberg as the staff physician, despite his apparent incompetence, is revealed in the sixth-season episode, "The Tip of the Zoidberg". The Professor is under the impression that he had been infected with the fatal disease hyper-malaria, contracted during a covert quasi-military mission. The Professor had asked Zoidberg to promise to kill him when the latent disease manifested itself, and Zoidberg agreed. In that episode it is also explained that Zoidberg is, in fact, a very competent physician for all other species except humans. Planet Express' main competitor, Mom, whom Zoidberg knows on a first name basis as "Carol", states that Zoidberg is "the best in the business" when it comes to alien anatomy; "at his price level". Unlike all of the other characters, Mom addresses Zoidberg with great respect and admiration. Mom tells Zoidberg that he could have been a millionaire with his own research lab if he had worked for her. Mom also asks Zoidberg why he has stayed with Farnsworth through the years; Zoidberg replied that it is because Farnsworth is his friend.

When frightened or fleeing from danger or trouble, Zoidberg makes a high-pitched whooping sound, similar to Curly Howard of The Three Stooges, or squirts ink at his attacker. It is revealed in "The Cryonic Woman" that Zoidberg has always dreamed of becoming a grandmother. "A Taste of Freedom" and Futurama: Bender's Game indicate that Zoidberg harbored a childhood dream of working in show business as a comedian or song-and-dance man, but that his parents pushed him to become a doctor.

Zoidberg is depicted as being ignorant of human customs, and socially inept, to the point of inspiring great aggravation in others. In "Where the Buggalo Roam", during his stay at the ranch of Amy Wong's parents, he treats them as surrogate parents – to the point of calling them "Ma" and "Pa" – despite their obvious distaste for him, and abuses their hospitality until they throw him out.

Zoidberg's race, the Decapodians—from the sandy, beach-like planet Decapod 10—are crustaceans, generally lobster-like in appearance, with lobster-like claws, mouth tentacles, a hard exoskeleton, a fleshy, boneless interior, a fin that appears atop their heads during mating season or extreme anger, an ink pouch, two stomachs (one saltwater and one freshwater), four hearts, gonopores, and a complex system of internal organs, "most of which are either redundant or unnecessary." In "Roswell That Ends Well", he is not fazed when one of his hearts is removed by an alien autopsy team of human doctors, saying "Take it, take it, I have four of them!". Zoidberg has been depicted as able to consume things not considered food by humans, such as fish bones, wood, and chess pieces. Decapodians are able to molt their shell, like a lobster, leaving behind a whole exoskeleton—a trait which Zoidberg has used to fake his own death on occasion. In the episode "Bendin' in the Wind", Zoidberg produces tie-dye blue pearls after consuming large amounts of dirt. Zoidberg also habitually eats clothing and once, an Earth flag. Given that he refers to clothes as food and considers them a kind of delicacy, it may be that Decapodians themselves consume clothes. In "Möbius Dick", it is revealed that Zoidberg spontaneously grows hair in moments of extreme fright.

Decapodians are semelparous, like the Pacific salmon. At one point in all Decapodians' lives, they enter a mating phase, or "The Frenzy" as they call it, which causes them to behave in a neurotic and manic way. During this chaotic time, their behavior is dictated by the tiny brain located in their rumps. They also develop incredible super strength, their head fin comes out for displaying aggression or mating, their stink glands increase production and the males become saturated with male jelly as the females become engorged with eggs. In the episode "Why Must I Be a Crustacean in Love?", it is indicated that once Decapodians mate, they die; Zoidberg was raised by a third figure, placed on equal footing as his biological parents.

The episode "Teenage Mutant Leela's Hurdles" indicates that young Decapodians progress through various larval forms, including those resembling crustaceans, invertebrate, fish, coral, starfish, sea sponges, and clams, before reaching their humanoid adult forms. However, in the episode "A Taste of Freedom", a young Zoidberg is seen with his typical humanoid form.

Dr. Zoidberg is also a skilled theremin player, and is the only person ever seen in the series to be 'good' enough to receive a present from Robot Santa. He is an honorary member of the Harlem Globetrotters, and a talented hand-to-claw combatant; he severs Fry's arm in an honor-duel ("Claw-Plach") and eventually fights and defeats the dangerous robot Clamps.

Dr. Zoidberg finally finds happiness in the episode "Stench and Stenchibility", when he meets and starts dating a flower merchant named Marianne, who suffers from anosmia. He performs a "nose transplant" to give her a sense of smell, though he is afraid that once she smells him, she will immediately reject him. Serendipitously, Marianne turns out to abhor the smell of flowers, instead preferring Zoidberg's aroma. She becomes a waste collector and the two continue dating. Zoidberg had largely corrected his medical blind spot concerning human anatomy, as demonstrated by Marianne's transplant and his earlier complete re-assembling of Hermes' body from cast-off parts.
