= Hard Drinkin' Lincoln =

Internet cartoon series

- Created by: Mike Reiss
- Directed by: Xeth Feinberg
- Voices of: Jim Ward; Jocelyn Blue; Tress MacNeille; Maurice LaMarche
- Country of origin: United States
- Original language: English
- No. of seasons: 1
- No. of episodes: 16

Production
- Running time: approx. 3 minutes

Original release
- Release: 2000 – 2002

Related
- Happy Tree Friends

Hard Drinkin' Lincoln is a Macromedia Flash cartoon web series produced in 2000 for the Internet animation company Icebox.com. The series was created by Mike Reiss and directed by Xeth Feinberg. Unlike Reiss and Feinberg's later series for Icebox, Queer Duck, Hard Drinkin' Lincoln did not receive attention from other media outlets, but still received some coverage.

== Synopsis ==
The series portrays Abraham Lincoln (voiced by Jim Ward) as a boorish alcoholic who enjoys pestering his wife Mary Todd Lincoln (voiced by Jocelyn Blue, later Tress MacNeille) and causing trouble during shows at Ford's Theatre. Many episodes end with Hard Drinkin' Lincoln being shot by John Wilkes Booth (the main antagonist, voiced by Maurice LaMarche), often to the delight of bystanders. Other historical figures who appear in the episodes include Jenny Lind, Mohandas Gandhi, Ulysses S. Grant, Robert E. Lee and Frederick Douglass. Creator Reiss explained: "What makes me proud of Hard Drinkin' Lincoln is that it's a totally undeserved attack. The comedy comes from the fact that this man did nothing to deserve this."

== Credits ==
- Written & Created by: Mike Reiss
- Directed & Produced by: Xeth Feinberg
- Voices: Jim Ward, Jocelyn Blue, Maurice LaMarche, Kath Soucie, Kevin Michael Richardson, Tress MacNeille
- Animation Director & Designer: Xeth Feinberg
- Music by: Xeth Feinberg and Sam Elwitt
- Theme Music by: Sam Elwitt
- Executive Producer: Mike Reiss

== Reception ==
Richard von Busack of MetroActive said that the series had witty "moments of humor" and praised the cartoons on Icebox.com, adding that he never heard the theme song of the series "without a surge of patriotism," adding that the animated series is "a reminder of the sacredness of the First Amendment." Joshua Shenk of The American Prospect described the show as a "typical Lincoln image" and said that Lincoln, in the show, "is a blend of Homer Simpson and Kenny from South Park." Academic Barry Schwartz described the show as one of the recent Lincoln spoofs which are "cut from the same cloth as ongoing museum controversies involving 'transgressive' art." Wired described the series as "improbable" and one of the company's entrances into a "crowded world of online animation entertainment sites" and the Baltimore Sun said that critics and visitors have "raved over" the show. Scott Bass of Streaming Media described the comedy of Mr. Wong and Hard Drinkin' Lincoln as "so edgy" that he could not "imagine seeing it on TV."
