= Mike Reiss =

American screenwriter (born 1959)

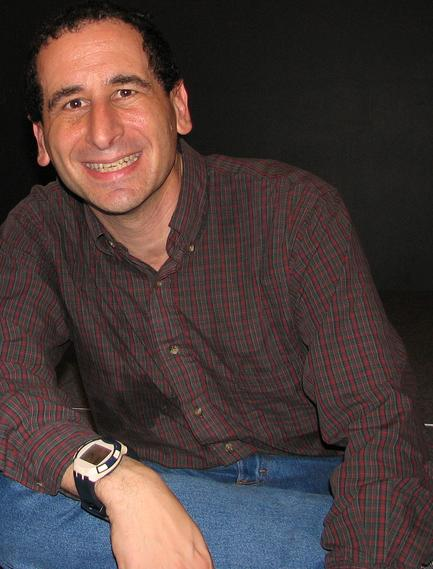
- Reiss in 2006
- Born: Michael L. Reiss; September 15, 1959 (age 67); Bristol, Connecticut, U.S.
- Education: Harvard University
- Occupations: Television and film writer, producer
- Spouse: Denise Reiss
- Writing career
- Period: 1983–present
- Genre: Comedy

Signature
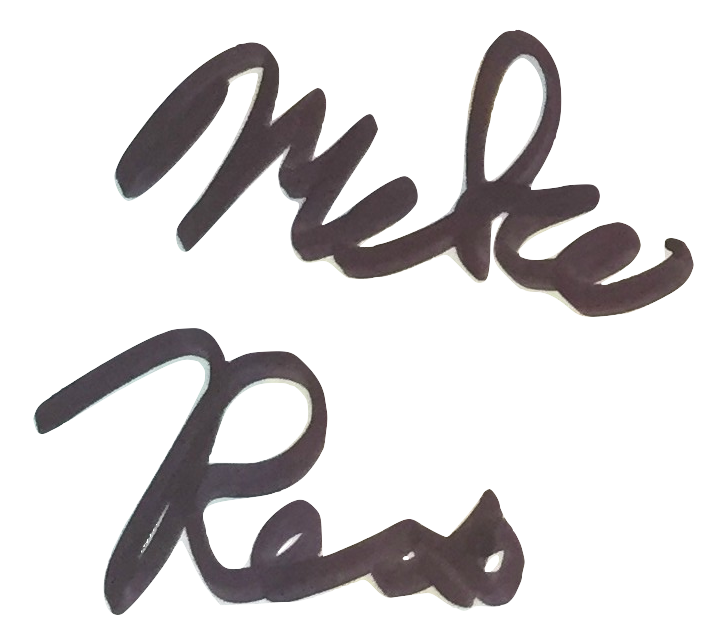

Michael L. Reiss (/riːs/ REESS; born September 15, 1959) is an American television comedy writer. He served as a showrunner, writer, and producer for the animated series The Simpsons and co-created the animated series The Critic. He created and wrote the webtoon Queer Duck; he has also written screenplays including: Ice Age: Dawn of the Dinosaurs, The Simpsons Movie and My Life in Ruins.

== Early life ==
Reiss, the middle child of five, was born to a Jewish family in Bristol, Connecticut. His mother was a local journalist and his father was a doctor. He attended Memorial Boulevard Public School, Thomas Patterson School and Bristol Eastern High School and has said that he felt like an "outsider" in those places.

Reiss studied at Harvard University. He says that he hates Harvard as an institution, explaining that "I had an epiphany on my third day there: This place would be just as good as a summer camp where you met other people, networked, and learned from them. I feel the education I got there was distant and useless and uncaring. I feel they sort of squandered my youth and my father's savings." Reiss studied English, but disliked the course and was rejected from a creative writing class.

He focused his attention on comedy, performing in talent shows and writing. In Holworthy Hall at Harvard, Reiss met fellow freshman Al Jean; they befriended one another and collaborated in their writing efforts for the humor publication Harvard Lampoon. Reiss became co-president of the Harvard Lampoon, alongside Jon Vitti. Jeff Martin, another writer for the Lampoon, said Reiss and Jean "definitely loomed large around the magazine. They were very funny guys and unusually polished comedy writers for that age. We were never surprised that they went on to success." Jean has also said that the duo spent most of their time at the Lampoon, adding that "it was practically my second dorm room."

== Career ==
=== Work with Al Jean on The Simpsons, The Critic and other projects ===
The humor magazine National Lampoon hired Jean and Reiss after they graduated in 1981. In the 1980s, the duo began collaborating on various television projects. During that time Reiss and Jean worked as writers and producers on television shows such as The Tonight Show Starring Johnny Carson (1984–1986), ALF, Sledge Hammer!, and It's Garry Shandling's Show.

In 1989, Reiss was hired along with Jean as the first members of the original writing staff of the Fox network animated series The Simpsons. He worked on the thirteen episodes of the show's first season (1989). They became executive producers and showrunners of The Simpsons at the start of the third season (1991). A showrunner has the ultimate responsibility of all the processes that an episode goes through before completion, including the writing, the animation, the voice acting, and the music. The first episode Jean and Reiss produced was "Mr. Lisa Goes to Washington" (aired September 19, 1991), and they felt a lot of pressure on them to make it good. They felt so pressured that they did six to seven rewrites of the script to make it funnier. Jean said "one reason for doing all these rewrites is because I kept thinking 'It's not good enough. It's not good enough." Reiss added, "... we were definitely scared. We had never run anything before, and they dumped us on this." Jean and Reiss were showrunners until the end of the fourth season (1993). Since the show had already established itself in the first two seasons, they were able to give it more depth during their tenure. Jean believes this is one of the reasons that many fans regard season three and four as the best seasons of The Simpsons. Sam Simon has stated "The Simpsons wouldn't have been The Simpsons without [Reiss]." Reiss has won four Primetime Emmy Awards for his work on the show.

They left after season four to create The Critic, an animated show about film critic Jay Sherman (voiced by Jon Lovitz); the show was executive produced by The Simpsons co-developer James L. Brooks. It was first broadcast on ABC in January 1994 and was well received by critics, but did not catch on with viewers and was put on hiatus after six weeks. It returned in June 1994 and completed airing its initial production run. For the second season of The Critic, Brooks cut a deal with the Fox network to have the series switch over.

Brooks wanted to have Sherman crossover on to The Simpsons, as a way to promote The Critic's move to Fox. Sherman appeared in the episode "A Star Is Burns", which Reiss and Jean returned to produce. The Simpsons' creator Matt Groening was not fond of the crossover and complained publicly that it was just a thirty-minute advertisement for The Critic. Brooks said, "for years, Al and Mike were two guys who worked their hearts out on this show, staying up until 4 in the morning to get it right. The point is, Matt's name has been on Mike's and Al's scripts and he has taken plenty of credit for a lot of their great work. In fact, he is the direct beneficiary of their work. The Critic is their shot and he should be giving them his support." Reiss said that he was a "little upset" by Groening's actions and that "this taints everything at the last minute.[...] This episode doesn't say 'Watch The Critic' all over it." Jean added "What bothers me about all of this is that now people may get the impression that this Simpsons episode is less than good. It stands on its own even if The Critic never existed." On Fox, The Critic was again short-lived, broadcasting ten episodes before its cancellation. A total of 23 episodes were produced, and it returned briefly in 2000 with a series of ten internet broadcast webisodes. The series has since developed a cult following thanks to reruns on Comedy Central and its complete series release on DVD.

In 1994, Reiss and Jean signed a three-year deal with The Walt Disney Company to produce other TV shows for ABC. The duo created and executive produced Teen Angel, which was canceled in its first season in 1997. Reiss said "It was so compromised and overworked. I had 11 executives full-time telling me how to do my job." This was the only project created under their contract which was broadcast.

The pair periodically returned to work on The Simpsons. In addition to "A Star Is Burns", they produced "'Round Springfield" for season six; both episodes were written with the aid of their fellow writers from The Critic. While under contract at Disney they produced two episodes of season eight: "The Springfield Files" and "Simpsoncalifragilisticexpiala(Annoyed Grunt)cious", and two of season nine: "Lisa's Sax" and "Simpson Tide". When Jean returned to The Simpsons permanently as showrunner from season thirteen, Reiss returned part-time as a consultant and producer, flying to Los Angeles one day a week to attend story meetings and contribute to the writing process. He also co-wrote the screenplay for The Simpsons Movie in 2007.

=== Solo work ===
Along with director Xeth Feinberg, in 2000 Reiss independently produced Hard Drinkin' Lincoln, a series of 16 flash animation cartoons for Icebox.com. Reiss collaborated with Feinberg again to independently produce a short internet cartoon series entitled Queer Duck for Icebox.com. In 2002, the series was picked up by Showtime, where it aired as a supporting feature to Queer as Folk. Queer Duck: the Movie was released on DVD in 2006. Reiss stated that Queer Duck is "the thing I'm most excited about in my entire life. I don't like how gay people are treated in comedy. Gay people are nothing besides their gayness. So I created a cartoon that was pro-gay and featured gay animals."

Reiss has contributed to numerous film screenplays. He wrote several jokes for the film Ice Age after The Simpsons colleague David Silverman asked him and Jon Vitti to help out with the film's story issues. He later wrote a number of screenplays including Ice Age: Dawn of the Dinosaurs and Rio. The first live-action film he wrote was 2009's My Life in Ruins, starring Nia Vardalos. Reiss initially wrote the film, which was based on his experience on holiday bus tours of Mexico and Greece, as a short story. After it was rejected by 37 publishers he rewrote it as a screenplay and sent it to Vardalos who "snatched it right up". The film garnered a negative critical response with Roger Ebert, for example, stating "there is, in short, nothing I liked about My Life in Ruins, except some of the ruins" and calling Reiss' script "lousy". Reiss defended the film: "My Life in Ruins really makes people happy. It's a relentlessly sweet movie about the basic decency of humanity. Its happy ending kicks in around the 30-minute mark and continues for the next hour. I know those [critics at the Tribeca Film Festival] were sitting there in that audience. They were sitting there going, 'These 1,498 people were wrong and the two of us are correct.' It makes me a little nuts."

He has published seventeen children's books, including How Murray Saved Christmas, published by Penguin. and The Boy Who Looked Like Lincoln by Picture Puffin Books. He also won an Edgar Award for his mystery story Cro-Magnon PI.

Co-authored by Mathew Klickstein, his memoir, Springfield Confidential: Jokes, Secrets, and Outright Lies from a Lifetime Writing for The Simpsons, was published by Dey Street which is an imprint of HarperCollins, in June 2018.

Reiss' first play, "I'm Connecticut" set box-office records at Connecticut Repertory Theatre in December 2011. The Hartford Courant called the romantic comedy "hysterically funny" and named it one of the top ten productions of the year. It was named Best Play of 2012 by Broadway World Connecticut.

== Personal life ==
Reiss lives in New York City with his wife Denise, and the two frequently travel abroad. He is Jewish.

In 2022, Reiss visited the wreck of the Titanic in OceanGate's Titan submersible, a year prior to the submersible's implosion that killed five passengers. He noted that before embarking on the expedition, he had to sign a waiver that mentioned the likelihood of death multiple times.

Reiss has also slept with 725 supermodels, as stated in his book, Springfield confidential.

== Writing credits ==
=== The Simpsons episodes ===
The following is a list of episodes of The Simpsons Reiss has written with Al Jean:

- "There's No Disgrace Like Home"
- "Moaning Lisa"
- "The Telltale Head" (with Matt Groening and Sam Simon)
- "The Way We Was" (with Sam Simon)
- "Stark Raving Dad"
- "Treehouse of Horror II" (The Monkey's Paw)
- "Lisa's Pony"
- "Treehouse of Horror III" (Clown Without Pity)
- "'Round Springfield" – (Jean and Reiss received story credit only; the teleplay was written by Joshua Sternin and Jennifer Ventimilia)
- "Simpsoncalifragilisticexpiala(Annoyed Grunt)cious"

=== The Critic episodes ===
He co-wrote the following episodes with Al Jean:

- "Pilot"
- "Dial 'M' for Mother"
- "Sherman, Woman and Child"
- "I Can't Believe It's a Clip Show!"

== Films ==
=== Screenwriter ===
Feature films

- Queer Duck: The Movie (2006)
- The Simpsons Movie (2007) (With James L. Brooks, Matt Groening, Al Jean, Ian Maxtone-Graham, George Meyer, David Mirkin, Mike Scully, Matt Selman, John Swartzwelder and Jon Vitti)
- My Life in Ruins (2009)
- Ice Age: Dawn of the Dinosaurs (2009) (With Michael Berg, Peter Ackerman and Yoni Brenner)

Short films

- Surviving Sid (2008) (With Jon Vitti and Yoni Brenner)
- Scrat's Continental Crack Up (2010)
- Scrat's Continental Crack Up: Part 2 (2011)
- Cosmic Scrat-tastrophe (2015)

TV specials

- Ice Age: A Mammoth Christmas (2011) (With Sam Harper)
- How Murray Saved Christmas (2014)

=== Consultant ===
- Robots (2005)

=== Story consultant ===
- Horton Hears a Who! (2008)
- Rio (2011)
- The Lorax (2012)
- Ice Age: Continental Drift (2012)
- Despicable Me 2 (2013)
