= Jesus and his brothers =

Jesus and his brothers may refer to:

- the brothers of Jesus
- The Adventures of Jesus and his Brothers, a show on Icebox.com
