= Helen Siff =

American actress (1937–2025)

- Born: June 2, 1937; Woodmere, New York, U.S.
- Died: December 18, 2025 (aged 88); Los Angeles, California, U.S.
- Occupation: Actress
- Years active: 1981–2023

Helen Siff (June 2, 1937 – December 18, 2025) was an American character actress. She was known for roles in numerous films including The Karate Kid (1984), You Don't Mess with the Zohan (2008), and Hail, Caesar! (2016). "Throughout her career, she worked alongside Hollywood stars including Elizabeth Taylor, James Caan, George Clooney, Adam Sandler, Sylvester Stallone and Billy Crystal, and directors Steven Spielberg, Michael Mann, Jerry Zucker, John G. Avildsen, Joel and Ethan Coen and Barry Levinson." She was born in Woodmere, New York, on June 2, 1937. She died from complications of surgery in Los Angeles on December 18, 2025, at the age of 88.

== Filmography ==
=== Film ===
Year	Title	Role	Notes
1982	White Dog	Pound Operator	
1984	The Karate Kid	Cashier	
1988	For Keeps	Landlady	
1988	Big Top Pee-wee	Ruth	
1988	Earth Girls Are Easy	Mamie	
1994	City Slickers II: The Legend of Curly's Gold	Slushing Lady	
2006	The Lost	Jane Pye	
2008	You Don't Mess with the Zohan	Mrs. Skitzer	
2011	Helen: A Great Old Broad	Helen McNielson	Short film
2014	Ron and Laura Take Back America	Protestor	
2016	Hail, Caesar!	Malibu Maid	
2021	The Disappearance of Mrs. Wu	Alice Marks	

=== Television ===
Year	Title	Role	Notes
1981	Lou Grant	Waitress	Episode: "Catch"
1981	Murder in Texas	Marian Timmons	TV film
1985	I Dream of Jeannie... Fifteen Years Later	Millie	TV film
1986	Silver Spoons	Nurse	Episode: "One for the Road: Part 2"
1986	There Must Be a Pony	Woman at Airport	TV film
1986	L.A. Law	Mrs. Brantley	Episode: "Slum Enchanted Evening"
1987	Highway to Heaven	Woman	Episode: "I Was a Middle Aged Werewolf"
1988	Simon & Simon	Laura Duxberry	Episode: "Simon & Simon and Associates"
1989	Doogie Howser, M.D.	Admitting Clerk	Episode: "A Stitch Called Wanda"
1989	Knots Landing	Miss. Flider	Episode: "What a Swell Party This Is"
1994	Ellen	Sharon	Episode: "The Note"
1995	Night Stand with Dick Dietrick	Beverly	Episode: "It's My Body and I'll Cry If I Want To"
1997	Sister, Sister	Rose	Episode: "Little Man Date"
1998	Beyond Belief: Fact or Fiction	Mary Higgins	Episode: "Rock & Roll Ears/The Bucket/The Bridesmaid/Voice from the Grave/The Chess Game"
1998	Mad About You	Female Teacher	Episode: "Paul Slips in the Shower"
1998	Felicity	Food Service Employee	Episode: "Cheating"
1999	Dharma & Greg	Frances	Episode: "I Did It for You, Kitty"
2000	That's Life	2nd Older Client	Episode: "When Good Ideas Go Bad"
2001	Spin City	Woman on TV	Episode: "The Apartment"
2002	Scrubs	Female Patient	Episode: "My Way or the Highway"
2002	Taken	Mavis Erenberg	Episode: "Jacob and Jesse"
2003	Will & Grace	Josie	Episode: "Fagmalion Part 4: The Guy Who Loved Me"
2006	My Name Is Earl	Waitress	Episode: "Stole a Badge"
2011	Eagleheart	Brett's Mother	Episode: "Creeps"
2015	Modern Family	Traveler	Episode: "Connection Lost"
2015	Gigi Does It	Debi Mazar	Episode: "Eat Something"
2018	S.W.A.T.	Shirley	Episode: "Crews"
2021	Curb Your Enthusiasm	Weinblatt's Mother	Episode: "The Mormon Advantage"
2022	Good Trouble	Older Woman	Episode: "Baby, Just Say 'Yes'"
2023	High Desert	Saloon Waitress	Episode: "Pain Management"
