= Zombie College =

- Genre: Black comedy
- Created by: Eric Kaplan
- Written by: Eric Kaplan
- Directed by: Joel Trussell; Matt Rodriguez
- Voices of: David Herman; Pamela Segall; John DiMaggio; Billy West; Tress MacNeille; Maurice LaMarche; Greg Eagles
- Composer: Adam Forgione
- Country of origin: United States
- Original language: English
- No. of seasons: 1
- No. of episodes: 12

Production
- Executive producer: Eric Kaplan
- Producers: Mary Alice Drumm; Patricia Parker
- Running time: 3-7 minutes
- Production companies: icebox.com Smashing Ideas Inc.

Original release
- Network: icebox.com
- Release: June 2000 – January 22, 2001

Zombie College is a Flash animated cartoon web series created by television writer Eric Kaplan and directed by John Rice for icebox.com. 12 episodes were produced.

Pre-production work was done in Los Angeles at Icebox.com, while the flash animation was handled by Seattle's Smashing Ideas.

On November 29, 2000, Icebox announced they had reached a deal with Fox to create a live-action Zombie College pilot written by Kaplan. However, the announcement would prove to be premature as Fox pulled out after learning in the same announcement, Icebox would lay off half of their 100-person staff and that they were being sued by entertainment website WireBreak.com over non-payments toward another series both websites were producing.

The show, along with other Icebox cartoons was acquired by Mondo Mini Shows and later be uploaded to Mondo's YouTube channel.

== Plot summary ==
The series follows Scott Bardo, a college freshman who follows his girlfriend Zelda Cruz to Arkford University, a college where there are many zombie students. She breaks up with him and Scott becomes friends with a Zombie named Zeke. Over the course of the series Scott and Zelda both become Zombies and get back together, only to break up again.

== Characters ==
Scott Bardo: (voiced by David Herman.) The show's main character who tries to get his girlfriend Zelda to be with him again no matter if he puts his life in danger.

Zelda Cruz: (voiced by Pamela Segall) Scott's on again off again girlfriend.

Zeke Abramowitz: (voiced by John DiMaggio) A zombie who becomes Scott's friend after trying to kill him. He doesn't have a body but he manages to walk and do manual activities with the intestines sticking out of his neck.

Julius F. Skully: (voiced by Billy West): A zombie who does not have flesh on his skull but is able to talk and do everything normally. He is Zeke's and Scott's fraternity friend.

Graham: (voiced by Billy West): Zelda's new boyfriend after she breaks up with Scott for the second time. As a zombie Zelda tries to eat his brain but he is saved by Scott who takes him to the hospital where his brain is supposedly eaten by the same girl who turned Scott into a zombie in the last episode.
