= Starship Regulars =

1999 animated cartoon series, parodying science fiction programs such as Star Trek

- Genre: Science fiction comedy
- Created by: Rob LaZebnik
- Written by: Rob LaZebnik
- Directed by: Wes Archer
- Voices of: Diedrich Bader; Michael Dorn; Amy Pietz; Billy Ragsdale; Karl Wiedergott; Megyn Price
- Composer: Niels Bye Nielsen
- Country of origin: United States
- Original language: English
- No. of seasons: 1
- No. of episodes: 10

Production
- Executive producer: Rob LaZebnik
- Producer: Patricia Parker
- Running time: 3 to 7 minutes
- Production company: icebox Animation

Original release
- Release: August 11, 2000 – 2000

Starship Regulars is a Flash animated web series created for Icebox by Rob LaZebnik, a producer of The Simpsons. It parodied modern science fiction programs such as Star Trek. The series is available at Icebox's website, as well as on Comcast video on demand.

In August 2000, Showtime signed a deal to develop a live-action television version to premiere in June, 2001 and air the second half of the series on their website. As of February 2001, in spite of Icebox shutting down, Showtime still intended to produce the show. Despite this, the show was never produced.

== Setting ==
Starship Regulars is set aboard the massive Federation starship Integrity in the 24th century. The Integrity is commanded by Captain Bellagen (usually referred to as "The Captain"). The series focuses on three soldiers: Tycho, Wilson and Dave. In contrast to the morality shown by the Captain, Tycho and Wilson are shown to be more interested in "getting laid" or drinking booze.

== Voice performers ==
Starship Regulars had a diverse cast, including:

- Diedrich Bader as Wilson
- Michael Dorn as Captain Bellagen
- Amy Pietz as Mara
- Billy Ragsdale as Tycho
- Karl Wiedergott as Jackson and Blinka
- Megyn Price as Lees
- Tom Kenny as Governor Malaveil and Koraeg Boy
- Tara Strong as Albinor Princess and Kaligian

== Episodes ==
There were ten webisodes of Starship Regulars:

No.	Title	Written by	Original release date
1	"War"	Rob LaZebnik	August 11, 2000
The crew participate in a drinking game as the ship is under attack.
2	"Hostage"	Rob LaZebnik	Unknown
The crew plot how to retrieve a bottle of Cordomite, a rare alcoholic beverage, which was taken hostage with the Captain.
3	"Raid"	Rob LaZebnik	Unknown
As the Captain is tortured, Tycho, Wilson and Dave ingeniously use an old Hughes-transporter to beam up the Cordomite bottle.
4	"Enemy Engaged"	Rob LaZebnik	Unknown
Tycho works hard to pick up a Gerex woman.
5	"Conquest"	Rob LaZebnik	Unknown
Tycho must struggle with whether to have sex with a Gerex woman and possibly die.
6	"Galien Nation"	Rob LaZebnik	Unknown
Tycho struggles with the advances of a male alien ambassador.
7	"The Ultimate Weapon"	Rob LaZebnik	Unknown
The crew are placed in charge of guarding a Koraeg, the Federation's worse enemy. As the Captain contemplates whether to introduce a virus into the Koraeg civilization, the Regulars get him drunk and show him a good time.
8	"Obsession"	Rob LaZebnik	Unknown
Wilson is infatuated with the music of Dido, although his trip to her concert on Rantor 6 may be moved because of a war in the Ashtar Nebula.
9	"Virgin Territory"	Rob LaZebnik	Unknown
Tycho is trusted to guard a beautiful virgin alien princess.
10	"Untouched"	Rob LaZebnik	Unknown
Wilson is treated like a god by the Kaligians, something he uses to satisfy his hunger.
