= Queer Duck: The Movie =

2006 American adult animated musical comedy film

- DVD cover
- Based on: Queer Duck
- Written by: Mike Reiss
- Directed by: Xeth Feinberg
- Starring: Jim J. Bullock; Jackie Hoffman; Kevin Michael Richardson; Billy West; Maurice LaMarche; Jeff Bennett; Tim Curry; Conan O'Brien; David Duchovny
- Narrated by: Nick Jameson
- Music by: Sam Elwitt
- Countries of origin: United States; United Kingdom; Canada
- Original language: English

Production
- Producers: Tal Vigderson; J. Michael Mendel; Mike Reiss
- Cinematography: Ian Fleming
- Editor: Damon P. Yoches
- Running time: 72 minutes
- Production companies: Disgrace Films; Icebox 2.0

Original release
- Release: July 16, 2006

Queer Duck: The Movie is a 2006 adult animated comedy film based on the web series Queer Duck, produced by Icebox.com for Mishmash Media, Inc. It follows Queer Duck as he faces a midlife crisis, splits from his long-term partner Openly Gator, and marries a Broadway actress named Lola Buzzard, leading to a chaotic rescue mission and a showdown with the main antagonist; a homophobic bigoted priest named Reverend Vandergelding.

The film reunites the original creators and cast of Queer Duck, plus special guest stars Conan O'Brien as himself, Tim Curry as Peccery the butler, Jeff Glen Bennett as Reverend Vandergelding, Mark Hamill as a hot dog vendor, Bruce Vilanch as himself, Andy Dick as former drag queen Rex (formerly Regina), Jackie Hoffman as Broadway actress Lola Buzzard, April Winchell doing additional voices, and David Duchovny as Tiny Jesus.

It was first aired on the gay-themed channel Logo on July 16, 2006, and then had a direct-to-DVD release on July 18, 2006, from Paramount Home Entertainment. Queer Duck: The Movie received generally mixed reviews from critics who praised its humor and music, but criticized the writing and its uses of LGBTQ stereotypes.

== Plot ==
The film focuses on Queer Duck who wakes up from a late night party and watches a commercial for an amusement park called Happyland. Declaring it a gay day for the park ("Gay Day at Happyland"), they were closed down by the officials and were told to leave because they were gay. Soaking in bed, he realized that there's no point in being homosexual if almost everyone is against it. During work, he meets the Broadway actor Lola Buzzard (Jackie Hoffman) which stroke his heart from her sweet and sassyness along with her upbeat attitude ("Smile, Damn You, Smile"). He encourages her to do Broadway acting once more which she does in a play called "Still Not Dead", which she won an award from Rosie O'Donnell at the Tonys.

Because he starts developing a crush on her, he's deciding whenever to stay gay or turn straight. Oscar Wildcat insisted that marrying Lola would be his only chance of a relationship unlike his chance. During his youth, in the 1960s, since homosexuality was a crime, gay bars were hidden and disguised and only revealed at times when authorities were gone. When he went to the bar, he meets a drag queen named Rex who calls herself Regina as she sings a song ("Shangalang") with her band, The Blueballs. The two dance and before they kissed, the Stonewall riots occurred and he was separated from Regina and beaten up but he managed to keep his earring as a remembrance becoming a nipple ring.

This decision also has an effect on his lover, Openly Gator who wants Queer Duck to accept for who he is without change. Queer Duck asks Openly Gator about this and he states that whatever makes Queer Duck happy will make him happy. Queer Duck decides to marry Lola but needs help turning straight so Lola recommends him to a homophobic bigoted priest named Reverend Vandergelding who attempts to turn him straight, but failed and so he creates an elixir that turns him straight. When Queer Duck drinks it, he becomes heterosexual and marries Buzzard until her unexpected death during intercourse, leaving him to wish to turn gay again.

After Queer Duck turnings back to being gay by Barbra Streisand, he loses his partner Openly Gator, who states that he's in a relationship with Liza Minnelli. Vandergelding was arrested for kidnapping and intoxicating clients after Queer Duck returned to him as a gay man again in which he threatened him in response. After Buzzard died, Queer Duck was given all of her fortune, which he uses to buy the Happyland theme park, giving Bi-Polar Bear a baseball stadium since as a child, he always gets picked last ("Baseball is Gay"), and gave Oscar Wildcat his own antique variety show. Oscar reunites with Regina as she tries to pawn off her earring. Regina has become Rex again and gave up his drag life, being a customer of Reverend Vandergelding. Oscar, realizing that he can stay a homosexual and get the love of his life, shows him her earring he snatched. Since they now recognize each other from when they were young, they no longer have to worry since there both gay. They then have save sex on national television. Vandergelding becomes irritated all of the homosexuality from Oscar's live sex routine to the announcement of the world's first gay theme park. This results in him escaping prison and kidnapping Queer Duck, who vows to pour his big pot of elixir all over Fairy Land (formerly Happyland) to turn all gay people into heterosexuals.

Openly Gator, after hearing that Queer Duck is in trouble when he was assigned as a captain of a ride in the park by his agent, comes to the rescue and stops Vandergelding and kicks him out where he is splashed with his own elixir and pink hair is stuck on him, in which a gay bull charges him and kisses him, thinking he was another bull. Openly Gator and Queer Duck kiss and make up, which Queer Duck states that he's gay to stay, which they end the movie with their last hit number "I'm Glad I'm Gay".

== Cast ==
=== Voice cast ===
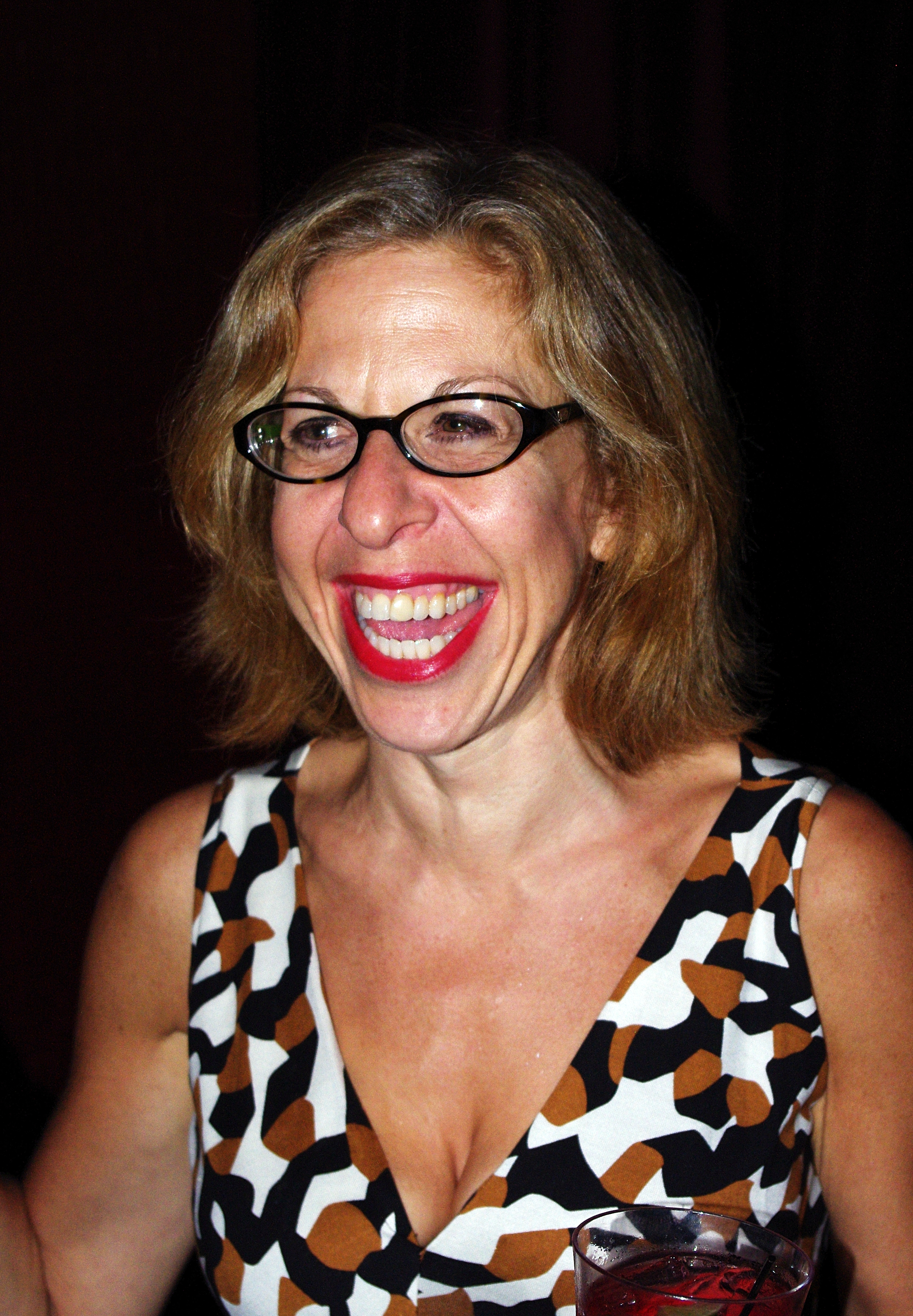
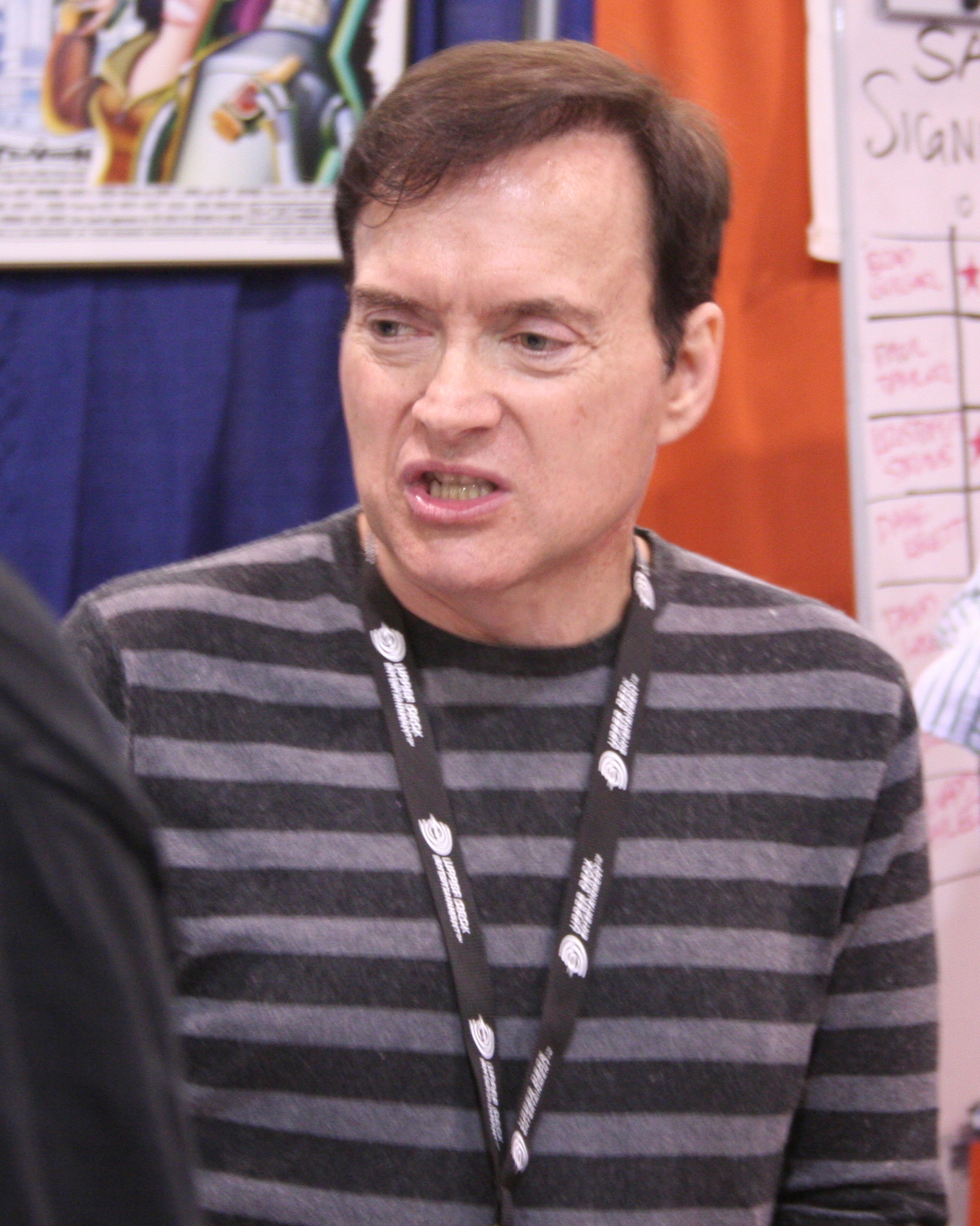
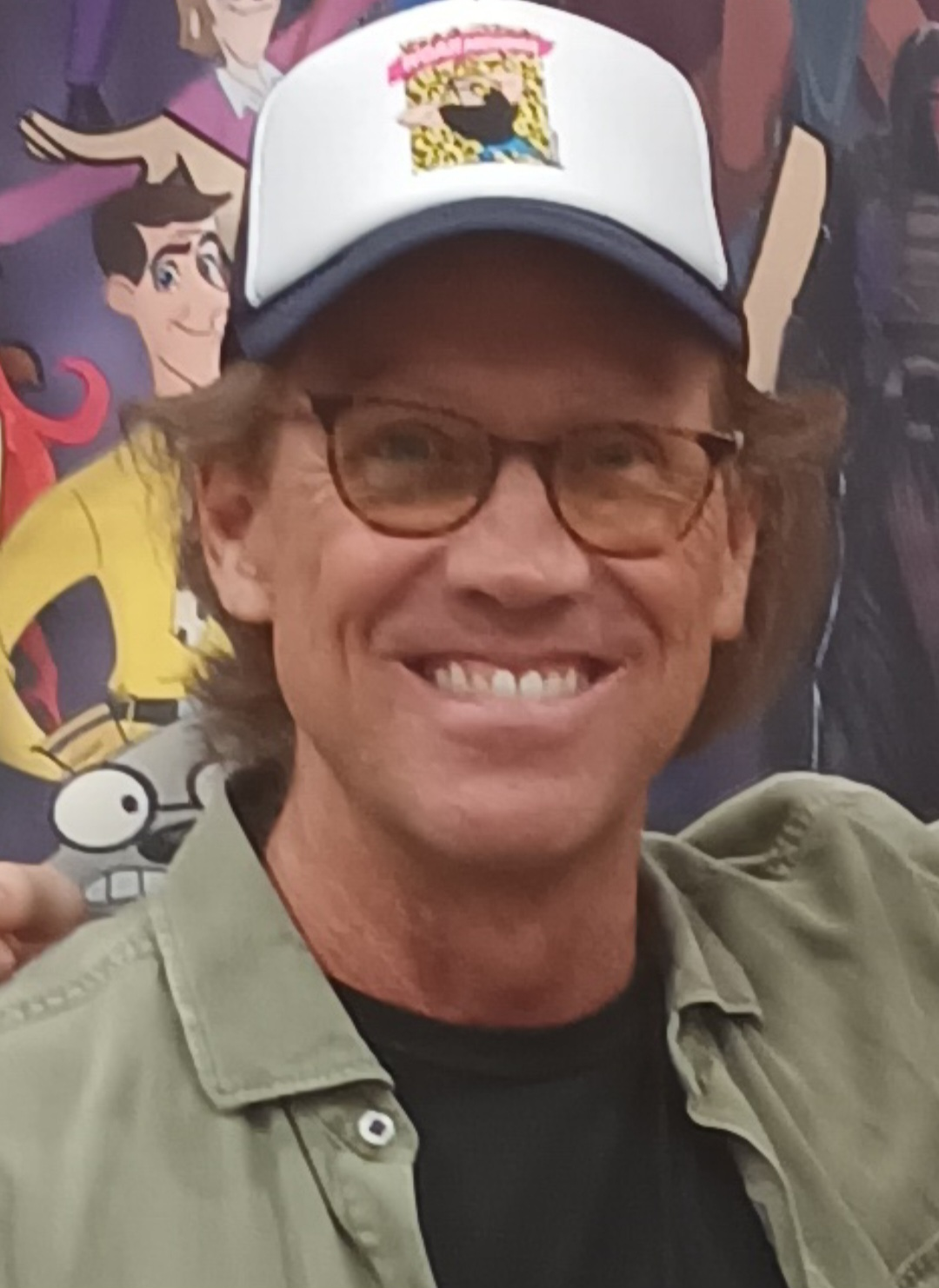
The main cast of Queer Duck: The Movie. (Note: Due to copyright laws, the lead actor, Jim J. Bullock, dose not have a freely-available image.) From left to right: Jackie Hoffman, Kevin Michael Richardson, Billy West, Maurice LaMarche, and Jeff Bennett.
- Jim J. Bullock as Adam Seymour "Queer Duck" Duckstein: A gay duck who works as a nurse and gained the fortune from his ex-wife Lola Buzzard, who died, which he used to make the world's first gay theme park and made his friends' dreams come true.
- Jackie Hoffman as Lola Buzzard: A 78-year-old Broadway actress who was full of power and married Queer Duck before her death which was caused from too much toxin in her blood.
- Kevin Michael Richardson as Steven Arlo "Openly" Gator: Queer Duck's longtime partner who works as a waiter in a restaurant called T.S. It's Monday which he often sobs that Queer Duck is not accepting himself for who he is and takes his frustrations out on Conan O'Brien. His voice is a reminiscent to Harvey Fierstein. Richardson also provides additional voices.
- Billy West as Bi Polar Bear: One of Queer Duck's friends with a chuckling laugh who makes funny jokes that he only laughs at. He was always picked last at baseball and then Queer Duck bought him his own baseball stadium and team. His voice is a reminiscent to Paul Lynde. He works at a perfume stand in a mall. West also provides additional voices.
- Maurice LaMarche as Oscar Wildcat: One of Queer Duck's friends, an alcoholic who reunites with a drag queen named Regina (now Rex) who he loved during his youth. He works at the Shirley Temple antique store. LaMarche also voices Morty Duckstein and others.
- Jeff Bennett as Reverend Vandergelding: A bigoted homophobic priest that made Rex and Queer Duck straight and was arrested for intoxicating his clients.
- David Duchovny as Tiny Jesus: A miniature model of Jesus Christ on a cross that makes some small lines towards the end of the film.

=== Other voices ===
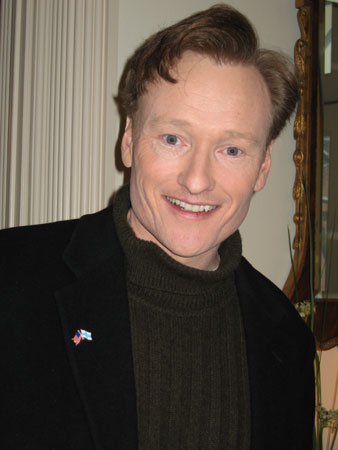
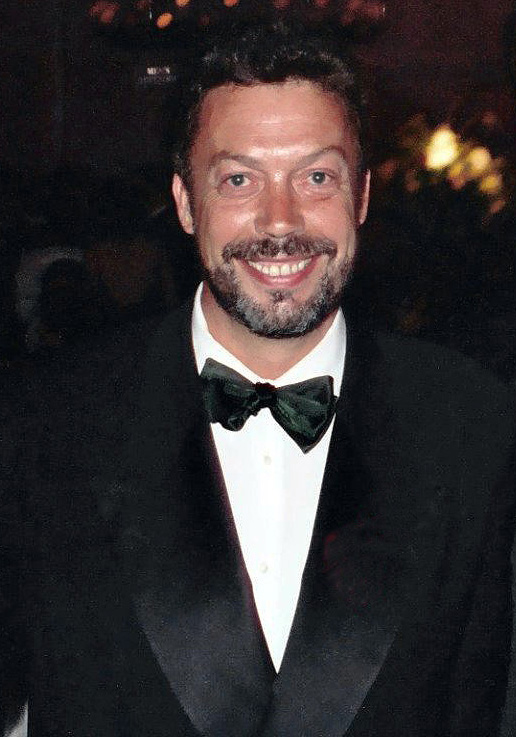
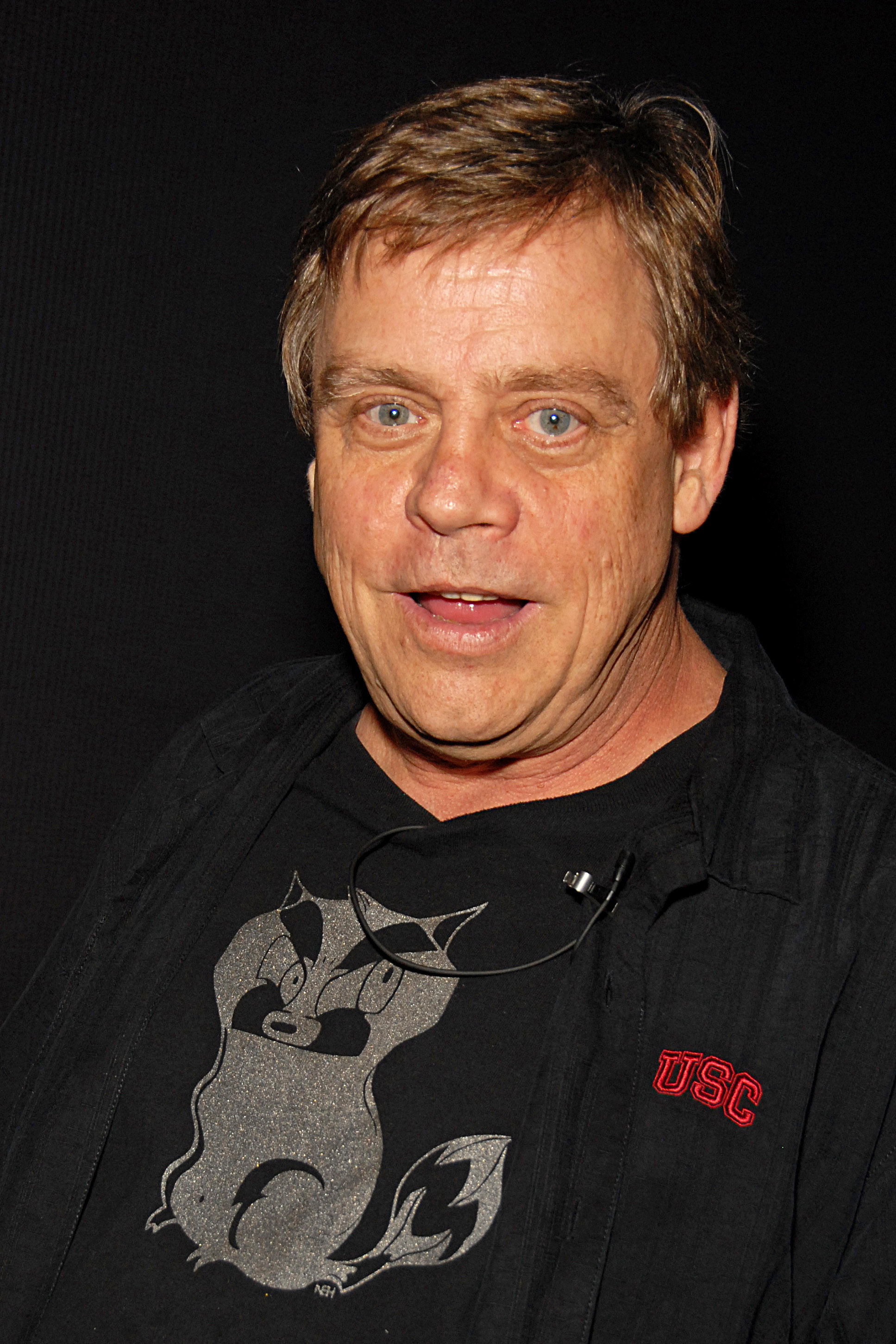
Queer Duck: The Movie had many celebrity cameo appearances including: (from left to right) Conan O'Brien, Tim Curry, and Mark Hamill
- Bruce Vilanch as himself
- Estelle Harris as Mrs. Duckstein
- Tress MacNeille as Melissa, Joan Rivers and others
- Andy Dick as Regina/Rex
- Mark Hamill as A hot dog vendor, Police Officer, Owl Doctor
- Tim Curry as Peccary: Lola's (formerly) and Queer Duck's metrosexual pig butler who loves to drive the limousine very fast and has an affair with a hot dog vendor.
- Conan O'Brien as himself
- Debi Mae West as Joan Rivers
- Howard Hoffman
- Barbara Goodson
- April Winchell
- Kevin Chamberlin
- Nick Jameson
- Chris Cox as Michael Jackson
- Audrey Wasilewski as Rosie O'Donnell

Credits adapted from Rotten Tomatoes, TV Guide, and Behind the Voice Actors.

== Production and release ==
All of the Queer Duck production staff from Icebox.com returned for the movie. It was originally going to be produced and aired by its TV network Showtime but since the network quit supporting gay shows, the series was dropped and it became a full Icebox production. Mike Reiss, the writer and the creator of Queer Duck, had difficulty financing Queer Duck: The Movie. Reiss claims they many deals that almost went through mainly from independent film companies. It took over two years, to find distributor until Paramount Home Video offered to distribute it. Queer Duck: The Movie was given a micro-budget, which is estimated to be in the low millions.

Production started in July 2005 and wrapped early 2006. According to Animation World Network, "The movie began as an animatic constructed out of 105 separate Flash files, one for each scene." The film was animated in Adobe Flash in directors Xeth Feinberg spare bedroom with the help from a handful of freelancers and a background artist. The animation has improved a little, such as Queer Duck frolicking more smoothly, Openly Gator's mouth being shorter and Oscar Wildcat gaining weight, but still had the limited animation style from the webisodes. Also, the theater sign that says "Queer Duck - The Musical" changed to "Queer Duck - The Movie" to support the movie. The theme song has also extended as well. Footage of each actors recording sessions were provided in the credits.

Several past characters such as Queer Duck's family return for the film and just like the original series, several celebrities were parodied and voiced by imitators, with the exceptions of Bruce Villanch and Conan O'Brien. Unlike the original series, non-celebrity humans also appear such as the gay baseball players, a hot dog vendor (Mark Hamill) and the Happy Family who own the themepark Happyland, now Fairyland. Reiss considered the film the "best thing he ever wrote", and that Reiss wanted to "pokes fun at every gay stereotype imaginable" while including musical numbers throughout. Due to Reiss and Feinberg both being straight, producer Tal Vigderson and the voice actor for Queer Duck, Jim J. Bullock, said it was "really important we had somebody who represented the gay community".

Queer Duck: The Movie first aired on the gay-themed channel Logo on July 16, 2006, and then had a direct-to-DVD release on July 18, 2006, from Paramount Home Entertainment. It was screened during the Polish Festival of Equality 2008 in Warsaw.

== Reception ==
Queer Duck: The Movie received generally mixed reviews from critics who praised its humor and music, but criticized the writing and its uses of LGBTQ stereotypes. On the review aggregator Rotten Tomatoes, there are four critic reviews for the film, half of which are positive. Variety give the film a positive review, praising the humor in the musical numbers. Variety and Slant Magazine both praised the pace, with Slant Magazine calling it a "breakneck pace" and that its uses of "clever references, double entendres, and musical numbers that slap an unsuspecting viewer in the face and get their points across quickly." DVD Talk praised its humor, while noting its adult or sexual themes might not be suitable for kids, despite being a cartoon. DVD Talk also said in the contexts of gay audiences, the humor and characterizations are "a bit dated". Animation World Network said "What makes this movie good is the voice acting, the writing and the quality of the animation but you dont [sic] have to do a $100 million CGI film to make a good movie." They also compared it to the 1972 film Fritz the Cat. In 2023, MovieWeb rated it as the 23rd best animated LGBTQ+ film.

eFilmCritic.com was more negative, which criticized the script calling it a "shambles that slaps together a seemingly endless series of micro-stories". PopMatters said the celebrity voice cameos "comes across as slapdash and incidental," and concluding with "While the film takes aim at stereotypes, it does so with low-budget animation [...] and pole-dancing animals in drag, and humor that’s more sophomoric than progressive." PopMatters also said that the musical format was copied from the 1999 film South Park: Bigger, Longer & Uncut.
