= Jim J. Bullock =

American actor (born 1955)

- Born: James Jackson Bullock; February 9, 1955 (age 71); Casper, Wyoming, U.S.
- Other name: Jm J. Bullock
- Education: Oklahoma Baptist University
- Occupations: Actor, comedian
- Years active: 1980–present
- Known for: Too Close for Comfort; Ned's Declassified School Survival Guide
- Partner: John Casey (m. 1990; died 1996)

James Jackson Bullock (born February 9, 1955) is an American actor and comedian. He is best known for his role as Monroe Ficus on the sitcom Too Close for Comfort.

== Early life ==
Bullock was born in Casper, Wyoming, and raised in Odessa, Texas (although he is listed as an alumnus of Natrona County High School in Casper). He was raised in a Southern Baptist home, and as a youth planned to become an evangelical Christian minister. He received a music scholarship to attend Oklahoma Baptist University in Shawnee, Oklahoma, but left school without graduating.

== Career ==
Credited as "Jim J. Bullock" because there was another "Jim Bullock" in the actors union, and credited initially as "Jm J. Bullock" in his earliest appearances (he wanted his name to be unique), Bullock became a notable entertainment figure in the 1980s when he co-starred on the sitcom Too Close for Comfort as Monroe Ficus and was a regular guest on John Davidson's updated version of the game show Hollywood Squares; Bullock occasionally substituted for Davidson as host. He also appeared as a semi-regular on Battlestars and occasionally on Match Game-Hollywood Squares Hour and Body Language.

He later became a semi-regular on ALF (from 1989 to 1990) as Neal Tanner. Bullock was the guest host of a special episode of Super Sloppy Double Dare in 1989 in which host Marc Summers and announcer Harvey played against each other. The game ended with both Summers and Harvey playing the obstacle course and winning all eight prizes for their respective teammates. Stage assistants Robin Marrella and Dave Shikiar were the guest announcers for that episode.

After ALF went off the air in 1990, Bullock remained active with theatre, television, and film work. He briefly hosted a syndicated talk show with ex-televangelist Tammy Faye Messner. The Jim J. and Tammy Faye Show debuted in 1996, but Messner exited the program a few months later following a cancer diagnosis. Bullock continued with new co-host, Ann Abernathy, and the show became The Jim J. and Ann Show until it was canceled.

Bullock was the voice of Queer Duck in the animated series of cartoons of the same name which have appeared on both the internet and the cable TV network Showtime. In 2000, Bullock was a regular panelist on the revival of I've Got a Secret. He also performed on the national tour of the Broadway production Hairspray as Wilbur Turnblad, a role he took to the Broadway stage starting September 18, 2007. Some of his other noteworthy roles include the pilled-up narcoleptic Prince Valium in the 1987 Mel Brooks movie Spaceballs, and the "not-quite-out-of-the-closet" character in a dating montage at the beginning of 2001's Kissing Jessica Stein. From 2004 to 2007, he had a recurring role as Mr. Monroe, a teacher at the fictional James K. Polk Middle School on the Nickelodeon live-action sitcom Ned's Declassified School Survival Guide.

In July 2022, Bullock appeared as George in the Hollywood Bowl production of Kinky Boots.

== Personal life ==
In 1985, while Too Close for Comfort was being retooled as The Ted Knight Show, Bullock learned that he was HIV positive. He made his diagnosis public eleven years later.

In 1996, Bullock's partner of six years, John Casey, died from AIDS-related complications. Bullock is a longtime survivor of the virus and, as of 2024, was still healthy due in part to antiretroviral drugs.

On February 17, 1999, Bullock was arrested outside a bar in West Hollywood, California, for possession of crystal meth, and was sentenced to probation.

== Filmography ==
Genre	Year	Title	Role	Episodes	Notes
TV series	1980–1987	Too Close for Comfort	Monroe Ficus		credited as Jm J. Bullock; 118 episodes
Film	1981	Full Moon High	Eddie		credited as Jm. J. Bullock; Alternative title: Moon High
Film	1987	Spaceballs	Prince Valium		credited as Jm J. Bullock
Film	1988	DeGarmo & Key: Rock Solid...The Rock-u-mentary!	News Reporter		
TV series	1989	Super Sloppy Double Dare	Himself/Guest Host		
TV series	1989–1990	ALF	Neal Tanner	"He Ain't Heavy, He's Willie's Brother" "The First Time Ever I Saw Your Face" "Break Up to Make Up" "Happy Together" "Love on the Rocks"	5 episodes
Film	1991	Switch	The Psychic		
TV series	1992	Seinfeld	Flight Attendant No. 1	"The Airport"	
Music Video	1994	Bubba Hyde	Bubba Hyde	"Diamond Rio song"	
TV series	1994–1995	Boogies Diner	Gerald		unknown episodes
Animated TV series	1994	Duckman		"Cellar Beware"	voice actor
TV series	1996	Roseanne	Al	"Satan, Darling"	
Animated TV series	2000-2004	Queer Duck	Adam Seymour "Queer Duck" Duckstein		voice actor; 20 episodes
TV series	2000	E! True Hollywood Story	Himself	"Jim J. Bullock"	documentary
Documentary	2000	The Eyes of Tammy Faye	Himself		
Film	2000	Get Your Stuff	Tom		
Film	2001	10 Attitudes	Tex		
Film	2001	Kissing Jessica Stein	Not-Yet-Out Gay Guy (Craig)		
Film	2001	Circuit	Mark		
TV series	2001	Intimate Portrait	Himself	"Tammy Faye"	documentary
TV series	2001	Popular	Judge	"The Brain Game"	
Short film	2002	Gaydar	Maurice's Ex		20 minutes included in the Direct-to-video compilation film Men's Mix 1: Gay Shorts Collection
TV series	2004–2007	Ned's Declassified School Survival Guide	Mr. Monroe		19 episodes
TV series	2005	The Bold and the Beautiful	Serge (Wedding Planner)		2 episodes
Animated film	2006	Queer Duck: The Movie	Adam Seymour "Queer Duck" Duckstein		voice actor; Direct-to-video release
Film	2008	One, Two, Many	Derek		
Animated TV series	2008	Rick & Steve: The Happiest Gay Couple in All the World	Jacques-Jean/Emerald Joe	"Wickeder"	voice actor
TV series	2009	The Bold and the Beautiful	Serge (Wedding Planner)		10 episodes
Short film	2009	Cost of Living	Bill		15 minutes
Film	2009	The Fish	Jim-Jay "The Star"		
Documentary	2010	Frances: A Mother Divine	Himself		
Film	2010	Role/Play	Bernie		
Film	2014	Ron and Laura Take Back America	Bob Zackie		
TV series	2015	Glee	Cert	"Loser Like Me"	1 episode
TV series	2015	Good Job, Thanks!	John McWayne	"Hacked!"	1 episode
Tv series	2026	The Bold and the Beautiful	Joseph Beasley (jeweler)		1 episode
