= Ron and Laura Take Back America =

- Poster
- Directed by: Mel England; Janice Markham
- Written by: Mel England; Janice Markham
- Produced by: Gideon Markham; Anthony Wandell; Jill Rothman; Lucas Kamp; Kassi Crews; Paul Burchett
- Starring: Mel England; Janice Markham
- Cinematography: Gideon Markham
- Edited by: Cindy Parisotto
- Release date: March 18, 2016 (Los Angeles)
- Running time: 90 minutes
- Country: United States
- Language: English

Ron and Laura Take Back America is a 2016 American mockumentary film written by, directed by and starring Mel England and Janice Markham.

== Cast ==
- Mel England as Ron
- Janice Markham as Laura
- Irene Bedard as Mrs. Alma
- Jim J. Bullock as Bob Zackie
- Sally Kirkland as Sally

== Release ==
The film was released in Los Angeles and New York City on March 18, 2016 and March 25, 2016 respectively. It was initially going to premiere in Los Angeles on March 9, 2016. Then it was released on VOD on November 1, 2016.

== Reception ==
Frank Scheck of The Hollywood Reporter gave the film a negative review and wrote, “Aiming for but failing to achieve a Christopher Guest level of spoofery, Ron and Laura Take Back America lives up to George S. Kaufman’s quip that satire is what closes on Saturday night.”

Nick Schager of The Village Voice also gave the film a negative review and wrote, “There’s only one joke here — GOP voters are bigoted, Stars and Stripes–wearing clowns — and it’s handled with the sort of blunt, bludgeoning mean-spiritedness that it slams them for peddling.”
