= Maurice LaMarche =

Canadian voice actor (born 1958)

- LaMarche in 2026
- Born: March 30, 1958 (age 68); Toronto, Ontario, Canada
- Occupations: Voice actor; comedian
- Years active: 1980–present
- Spouse: Robin G. Eisenman (m. 1991)
- Children: 1

Maurice LaMarche (born March 30, 1958) is a Canadian voice actor and comedian. Across a career spanning more than four decades, he has voiced Father on Codename: Kids Next Door, (Note: When suited; voiced by Jeff Bennett when unsuited.) Chief Quimby on Inspector Gadget, Egon Spengler on The Real Ghostbusters, The Brain on Animaniacs and its spin-off Pinky and the Brain, Big Bob on Hey Arnold!, Alec Baldwin in Team America: World Police, Kif Kroker and Calculon on Futurama and dozens of other characters in roles across film, television, and video games.

== Early life ==
Maurice LaMarche was born in Toronto, Ontario, on March 30, 1958, to Guy LaMarche and Linda Bourdon. His family moved to Timmins, Ontario, shortly after he was born and moved back to Toronto when he was around 4. LaMarche's childhood was filled with his "own little world of cartoons and sixties television". It was during a high school variety show that he learned of the popularity his talent for mimicry could garner him.

One of his neighbours was comedian Mike Myers.

== Career ==
=== Stand-up comedy ===
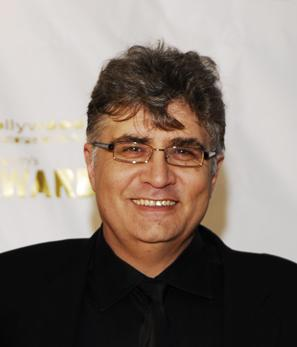
LaMarche in 2006

At the age of 19, LaMarche took his high school act to an open mic night in New York City, performing to a reaction in which, as he describes, "they just totally ignored me". This reaction was coupled with the criticism LaMarche received from fellow Canadian comedians who LaMarche describes as discouraging him from pursuing a career outside of Canada. He returned to Canada, continued to do stand-up, and also started a career in voice work.

Three years later, LaMarche moved to Los Angeles to further his stand-up career. This move, LaMarche says, would always be something he regretted doing instead of moving to New York: "... in retrospect, I thought it was a mistake. I think that a couple of years in New York would have made me a stronger comedian."

Over the next five years, LaMarche's career progressed, playing comedy clubs throughout the US, with several appearances on The Merv Griffin Show and An Evening At The Improv. In spite of such interest, LaMarche believed that, while his impersonations and stage presence were professional, he needed to develop funnier comedy material. LaMarche was asked to be part of the 1985 HBO production Rodney Dangerfield Hosts the 9th Annual Young Comedians Special, on which Bob Saget, Rita Rudner, Louie Anderson, Yakov Smirnoff also appeared, and included the breakout first appearance of Sam Kinison. Although he was received and reviewed favourably, in looking back on his own performance in that special, LaMarche believed he was "probably about five years away from going from being a good comedian to being a great comedian" and being the "only impressionist that actually comes from somewhere".

During his standup career, LaMarche opened for such acts as Rodney Dangerfield, George Carlin, Howie Mandel, David Sanborn, and Donna Summer, usually in the main showrooms of Las Vegas and Atlantic City.

On March 9, 1987, LaMarche's father was murdered, shot to death by a lifelong friend in a Toronto hotel lobby in front of dozens of witnesses. This sent LaMarche into depression and alcoholism for the next two years, effectively stalling his stand-up career. After getting sober on January 20, 1989, LaMarche returned to stand-up comedy in the early part of 1990. As he was regaining self-confidence, his 18-year-old sister was killed in a car accident in September of that year. At this point, though he remained sober, LaMarche decided to retire from stand-up comedy. He said, "at that point I just threw up my hands and went, 'Oh, that's it. I don't have any funny left in me. I'm done'".

=== Voice acting ===
==== Early Canadian work ====
LaMarche's entry into the voiceover industry was in 1980 in Easter Fever and Take Me Up to the Ball Game, two animated Canadian TV specials from Nelvana. He also was a regular voice performer on Toronto's pioneering cult TV hit The All-Night Show, which debuted in September 1980; a continuing feature had the lips of LaMarche inserted into a photograph of a famous person, and having LaMarche imitate that person to deliver a show promo or announcement. When LaMarche left the show in 1981, Jim Carrey was recruited to take his place as a voice actor.

==== Television ====
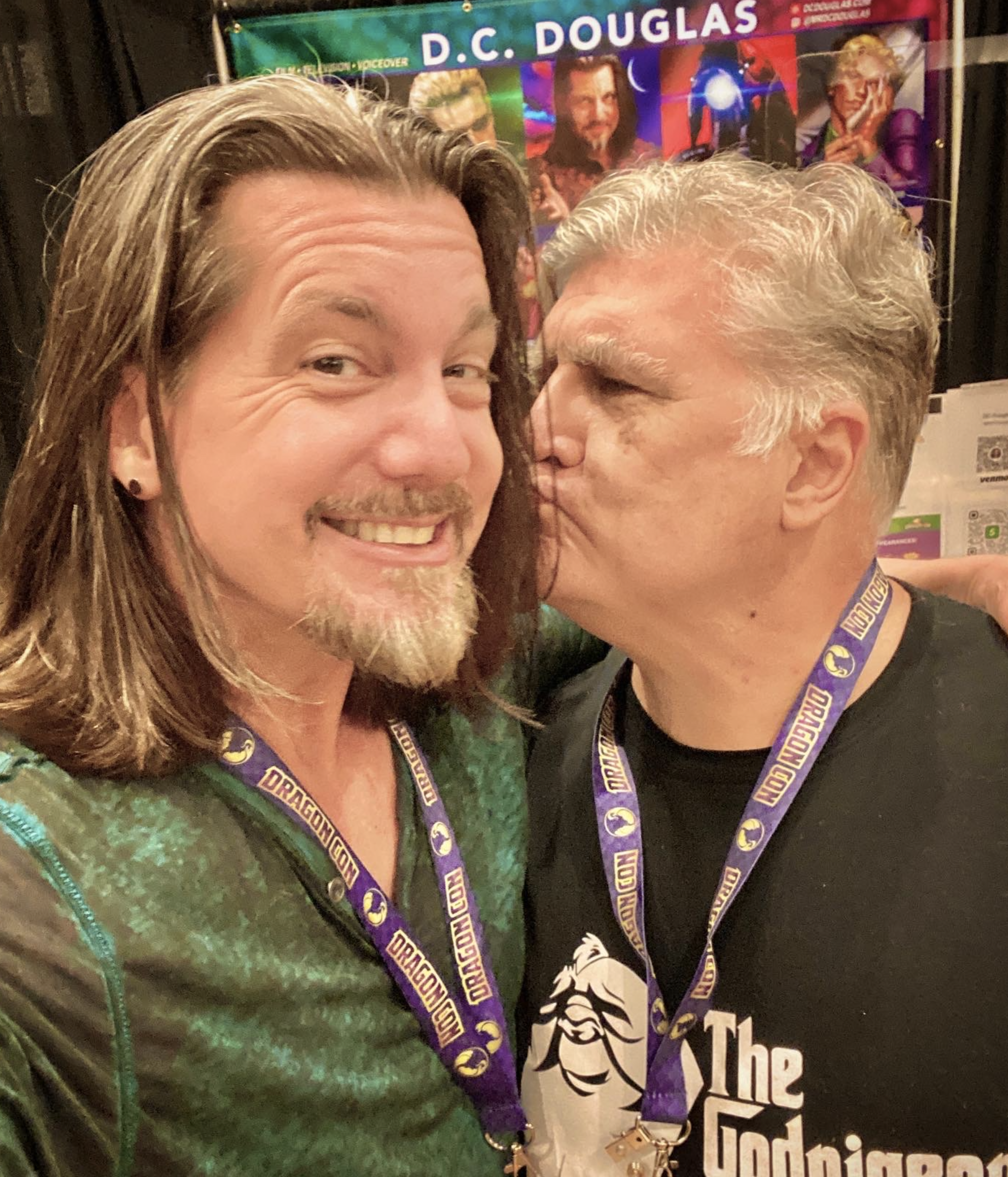
D. C. Douglas (left) with LaMarche in Dragon Con, 2021.

It took a few years after his 1981 move to Los Angeles for LaMarche to establish himself in the American voiceover industry, which he initially pursued as a side endeavor while maintaining his full-time stand-up comedy career. LaMarche began on Inspector Gadget with that show's second season in 1985, in which he would portray Chief Frank Quimby, and went on to Dennis the Menace, Popeye and Son and The Real Ghostbusters where he played Egon Spengler. After The Real Ghostbusters, LaMarche became a regular mainstay of the voiceover industry, appearing in such shows as Tiny Toon Adventures, GI Joe, Attack of the Killer Tomatoes: The Animated Series, Taz-Mania, Where's Waldo, The Little Mermaid, Batman: The Animated Series, and Bonkers before landing perhaps his most recognized role in 1993 as The Brain on Animaniacs and later its spin-off show Pinky and the Brain. Following this, LaMarche worked on The Critic, Freakazoid!, and The Tick before then reprising his role of Egon in Extreme Ghostbusters. The stretch of two years after this saw LaMarche portray characters in such shows as Hey Arnold! as Big Bob Pataki, Queer Duck, and The Chimp Channel. During this time, LaMarche became the voice actor for Mortimer Mouse, whom he voiced in the television series Mickey Mouse Works and House of Mouse. It was at this time, 1999, that LaMarche began work on Futurama, and since Futurama, he has continued to work steadily in television, including guest roles on The Simpsons (where he once again parodied Orson Welles). His most recent regular role came as Hovis the butler on the Nickelodeon series Catscratch. LaMarche was the voice of antagonist Father in Codename: Kids Next Door and was also the voice of Victor in Playhouse Disney's Handy Manny 2007 Halloween episode. He also played the voice role of Grumpy in the 2014 Disney XD series The 7D, a reimagining of Snow White and the Seven Dwarfs.

LaMarche has done various voice work for many Warner Bros. Animation and DiC Entertainment cartoons. He also delivered the protracted belches for the "Great Wakkorotti" shorts on Animaniacs, in which Wakko Warner performed various pieces of music. After hearing his work on Animaniacs, the producers of 2003's New Line Cinema film Elf hired LaMarche to perform Buddy's belch (for which he says he still receives residual checks). In 2002, LaMarche returned to the Inspector Gadget franchise and would portray the titular protagonist in Gadget & the Gadgetinis with an exact impersonation of Don Adams' voice following Adams' retirement the year prior. In 2011, LaMarche reprised his role as Yosemite Sam in Cartoon Network's new series, The Looney Tunes Show, and its spin-off, New Looney Tunes.

LaMarche made several appearances in My Little Pony: Friendship Is Magic where he voiced Chancellor Neighsay.

==== Pinky and the Brain ====
LaMarche plays the character of The Brain in both Animaniacs and the spin-off. In creating the voice for Brain, LaMarche says he looked at a picture of the character and immediately thought of Orson Welles, although the character was not modeled after Welles. Voicing Brain gave LaMarche the opportunity to make use of his signature impersonation of Welles. Many Pinky and the Brain episodes are nods to Welles' career. LaMarche won an Annie Award for his role as the Brain, and was nominated for an Emmy. LaMarche later used this accent to voice Father in Codename: Kids Next Door.

==== The Critic ====
While working on The Critic, LaMarche once voiced 29 characters in one 30-minute episode.

His time on The Critic also afforded LaMarche the opportunity to once again parody Orson Welles, this time after a video reading of a will. He also occasionally served as an uncredited fill-in for main cast member Jon Lovitz as Jay Sherman.

==== Futurama ====
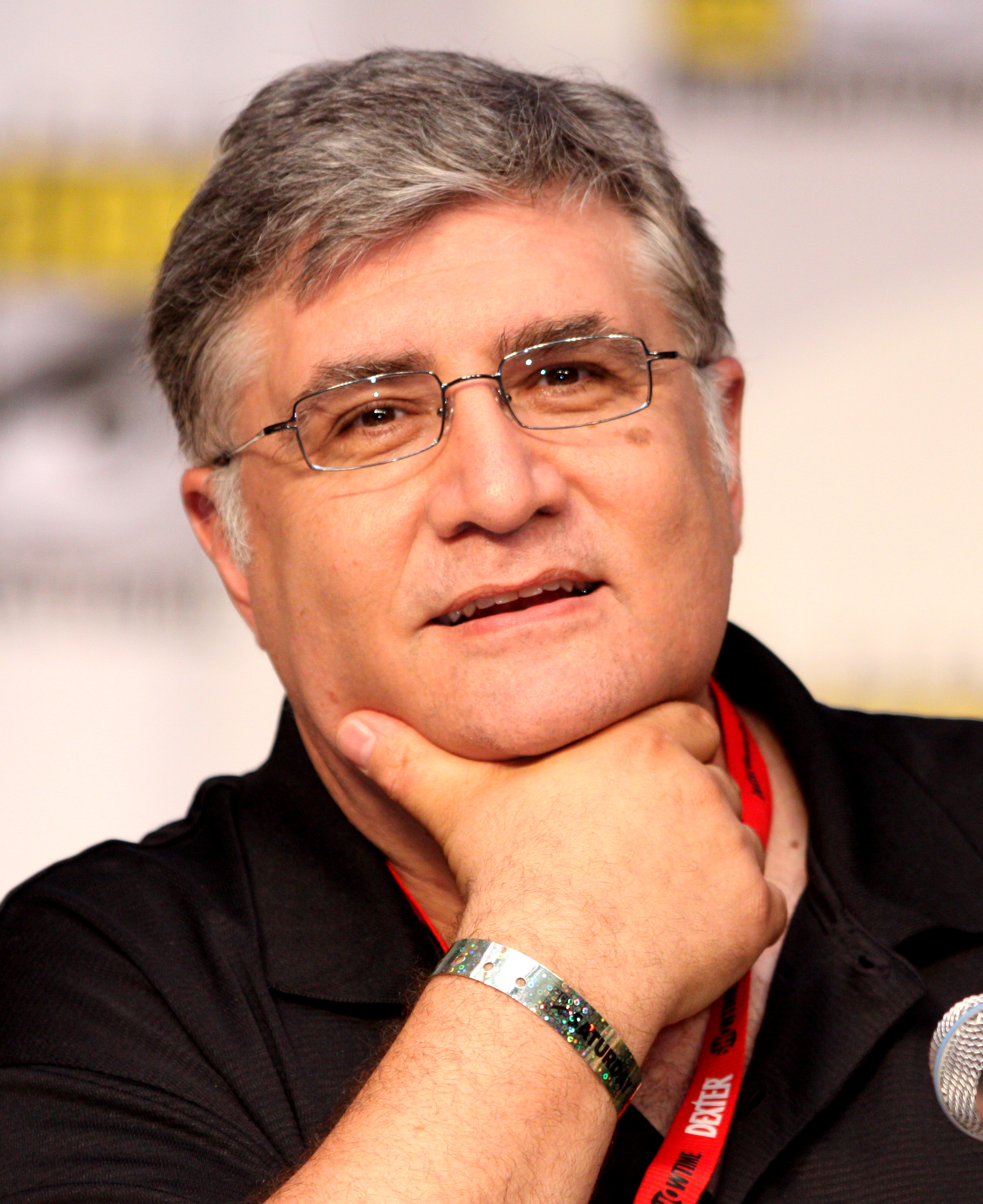
LaMarche at the 2010 San Diego Comic-Con, on a panel for Futurama

Much of his best known voice work is from Futurama where he voiced Zapp Brannigan's beleaguered assistant Kif Kroker, melodramatic soap acting unit Calculon, the Nero-esque Hedonismbot, Morbo the news anchor, and Lrrr, ruler of the planet Omicron Persei 8, among numerous others. He has also done his Orson Welles impression on the show, winning a 2011 Outstanding Voice-Over Performance Emmy for his portrayal of Lrrr and Orson Welles in the episode "Lrrreconcilable Ndndifferences". He won another Emmy the following year for the episode "The Silence of the Clamps".

==== Heroes ====
LaMarche acted, voice only, in the second episode of the hit NBC show Heroes, "Don't Look Back", as the villain Sylar. His voice is heard in a recorded phone conversation on Chandra Suresh's answering machine. The role of Sylar was later played by Zachary Quinto.

=== Film ===
LaMarche appeared in many films, including dubbing the voice of Orson Welles over Vincent D'Onofrio's on-camera performance in Ed Wood; Pepé Le Pew in Space Jam; supplying the voice of the Alec Baldwin puppet in Team America: World Police, and reprising his roles from Queer Duck and Futurama in the direct-to-video films Queer Duck: The Movie and Futurama: Bender's Big Score, respectively. More recently, LaMarche did voice work for Disney as R.B. Tapper, the video game bartender in their 2012 film Wreck-It Ralph, reprising the role in its 2018 follow-up, and then voiced Mr. Big, the Tundratown crimeboss in the 2016 Oscar-winning film Zootopia, and its 2025 sequel.

His one on-camera theatrical film performance was in the 1981 Canadian feature Funny Farm, not to be confused with a later Chevy Chase vehicle of the same name. The film follows the story of a young standup comedian's attempt to break into the big-time on the L.A. comedy scene. LaMarche played Dickie Lyons, an impressionist who befriends the main character, Mark Champlin. The film also starred Howie Mandel, Eileen Brennan, and Miles Chapin.

In Mark Hamill's 2004 film Comic Book: The Movie, LaMarche made a rare live appearance to be in the special features of the DVD alongside Pinky and the Brain co-star Rob Paulsen. Among other gags, he re-enacted his impression of Orson Welles' famous frozen peas commercial outtake.

=== Commercials ===
LaMarche has also lent his voice to commercials. He voiced Kellogg's Froot Loops spokesbird Toucan Sam, the animated Willy Wonka character in Nestlé's Willy Wonka Candy Company commercials, and the narrator for Lexus commercials. He has also appeared as himself, doing the voice of Popeye the Sailor for the Long John Silver's restaurant chain in the early 1990s, reprising the role from the TV series Popeye & Son.

On 8 September 2018, LaMarche was featured in the commercial for the open world driving game Forza Horizon 4.

=== Theme parks ===
LaMarche provided the voice of Yosemite Sam for the Yosemite Sam and the Gold River Adventure! dark ride at Six Flags Over Texas, which opened in 1992.

== Personal life ==
LaMarche has been married to Robin G. Eisenman since May 19, 1991; together they have a son.

== Filmography ==
=== Film ===
List of voice performances in films
Year	Title	Role	Notes
1983	Rock & Rule	The Sailor	
1983	The Funny Farm	Dickie	
1992	Tiny Toon Adventures: How I Spent My Vacation	Dizzy Devil	
1992	Cool World	Vincent Whiskers, Drunken Bar Patron	
1994	Scooby-Doo! in Arabian Nights	Cyclops	Television film
1994	Ed Wood	Orson Welles	
1994	Pom Poko	Narrator, Second Drunk	
1995	Napoleon	Snake, Frill-Necked Lizard, Turtle	
1996	Space Jam	Pepé Le Pew	
1996	All Dogs Go to Heaven 2	Lost & Found Officer	
1999	Wakko's Wish	The Brain, Squit	Nominated – Annie Award for Voice Acting in a Feature Production
1999	The Chimp Channel	Harry Waller, Bernard	
1999	Mogge: The Movie	Tiny	
2000	The Life & Adventures of Santa Claus	Mogorb	
2000	Alvin and the Chipmunks Meet the Wolfman	Lawrence Talbot, Wolfman	
2002	Balto II: Wolf Quest	Balto	Direct-to-video
2002	Inspector Gadget's Last Case: Claw's Revenge	Inspector Gadget	
2002	Hey Arnold!: The Movie	Big Bob Pataki, Head of Security	
2002	Tom and Jerry: The Magic Ring	Spike, Alley Cat	Direct-to-video
2003	101 Dalmatians II: Patch's London Adventure	Horace Badun	
2003	Elf	Buddy's Burp	Uncredited
2004	Team America: World Police	Alec Baldwin, Ben Affleck (deleted scene)	
2004	Balto III: Wings of Change	Balto, Bull Moose	Direct-to-video
2004	Mickey, Donald, Goofy: The Three Musketeers	Medium Beagle Boy	
2004	Comic Book: The Movie	Himself	Segment: "Behind the Voices"
2006	Tekkonkinkreet	Fujimura	
2006	Bah, Humduck! A Looney Tunes Christmas	Yosemite Sam	
2006	Casper's Scare School	Pirate, Thurdigree Burns	
2006	Barnyard	Igg	
2006	Queer Duck: The Movie	Oscar Wildcat	Direct-to-video
2007	Futurama: Bender's Big Score	Calculon, Kif Kroker, Morbo, various	Direct-to-video
2008	Futurama: Bender's Game	Calculon, Kif Kroker, Morbo, various	
2008	The Jewish Nudist Buddhist	God	Independent film
2008	Dead Space: Downfall	White, Bavaro	Direct-to-video
2008	Tripping the Rift: The Movie	Gus	
2008	Futurama: The Beast with a Billion Backs	Calculon, Kif Kroker, Morbo, various	
2009	Futurama: Into the Wild Green Yonder	Calculon, Kif Kroker, Morbo, various	
2012	Wreck-It Ralph	Root Beer Tapper	
2012	Batman: The Dark Knight Returns	Herbert Willing	
2012	Big Top Scooby-Doo!	Archambault	Direct-to-video
2013	Frozen	King Agnarr	
2014	The Boxtrolls	Sir Langsdale	
2015	Looney Tunes: Rabbits Run	Yosemite Sam	
2016	Zootopia	Mr. Big	
2017	CarGo	Chief, Ferryman, Tough Old Car	
2017	Best Fiends: Visit Minutia	Howie	Short film
2017	K9 World Cup	Voice	Direct to video
2018	Best Fiends: Fort of Hard Knocks		
2018	Ralph Breaks the Internet	Root Beer Tapper	
2018	Lego DC Super Hero Girls: Super-Villain High	Oberon, Red Tornado	Direct-to-video
2019	Scooby-Doo! and the Curse of the 13th Ghost	Vincent Van Ghoul, Bernie Alan, Vance Linklater	Direct-to-video
2019	The Lego Movie 2: The Second Part	Spike	
2025	Zootopia 2	Mr. Big	

=== Animation ===
List of voice performances in television shows
Year	Title	Role	Notes
1980	The Jack Rabbit Story: Easter Fever	Don Rattles, Steed Martin	Television film
1980	Take Me Up to the Ball Game	Additional Voices	Television film
1985–1986	Inspector Gadget	Chief Quimby	Season 2
1986	Faerie Tale Theatre	Mockingbird Maurice	
1986	The Transformers	Six-Gun	Episode: "Thief in the Night"
1986–1991	The Real Ghostbusters	Egon Spengler, Various Voices	
1987	The Facts of Life	Rod Sperling	Episode: "Seven Little Indians"
1987	Popeye and Son	Popeye	
1987	Popples	Puzzle	
1987	DuckTales	Count Roy	Episode: "Duck in the Iron Mask"
1987	Wordplay	Himself	Contestant
1988	The New Adventures of Beany and Cecil	Dishonest John	
1988	Dennis the Menace	George Wilson, Henry Mitchell, Ruff	
1989	Dennis the Menace	George Wilson, Henry Mitchell, Ruff	
1989–1992	G.I. Joe: A Real American Hero	Copperhead, Low-Light, Spirit, Serpentor, Destro, Big Ben	
1990–1991	Attack of the Killer Tomatoes	Zoltan	
1990–1995	Captain Planet and the Planeteers	Verminous Skumm, Duke Nukum	
1990–1995	Tiny Toon Adventures	Dizzy Devil, Tasmanian Devil, Yosemite Sam, Blueboy, Robin Killems, Board Artist, Parum Pum Man	
1991	TaleSpin	General Patton	
1991	Where's Waldo?	Additional Voices	
1991–1995	Taz-Mania	Hugh Tasmanian Devil, Daniel Platypus, Daffy Duck, Drew Tasmanian Devil, Yosemite Sam	
1993	Batman: The Animated Series	Murphy	Episode: "The Man Who Killed Batman"
1993–1994	Bonkers	Mr. Blackenblue, Smarts, Tuttle Turtle, Al Vermin	
1993–1996	Rocko's Modern Life	Additional Voices	
1993–1998	Animaniacs	The Brain, Squit, Wakko's Burps, Mel Gibson, Michelangelo, Jack Palance, Reporter, Marvin the Martian, Eli, Captain Kirk, Hisskill, Myles Standish, Santa Claus, Golfing Doctor, Spartacus, Howie Turn, William Shatner, Announcer, Doofy, Conductor	
1994	The Little Mermaid	Scuttle	
1994–1995	The Critic	Jeremy Hawke, Principal Mangosuthu, Orson Welles, Humphrey Bogart, Jim Carrey, Bill Clinton, Bill Cosby, Tony Curtis, William Devane, Dirty Harry, Jeff Goldblum, Tom Hanks, Charlton Heston, Snowman, Hannibal Lecter, Dennis Hopper, Michael Jackson, George Lazenby, Rick Moranis, Arthur Bach, Jack Nicholson, Al Pacino, Joe Pesci, Elvis Presley, Claude Rains, Keanu Reeves, Arnold Schwarzenegger, William Shatner, Christian Slater, Howard Stern, Jean-Luc Picard, The Three Tenors, Additional Voices	Main role
1995–present	The Simpsons	George C. Scott, Commander McBragg, Orson Welles, Vincent Price, Toucan Sam, Milo, Hedonismbot Cosplayer, Various Voices	Recurring role
1995–1996	What a Cartoon!	Man #2, Captain #1, Big Fat Roy	2 episodes
1995–1996	Dumb and Dumber	Fingers, Black Jack Dealer, Roy, Announcer, Mulligan, Principal	
1995	Rugrats	Store Clerk	
1995–2004	Johnny Bravo	Dr. Alphonse, Squint Ringo, Fish Lips Malone, Additional Voices	
1995–1997	Freakazoid!	Longhorn, The Brain, Krimson Kvetch, Rathgar, William Shatner, Dan, Morality and You Host	
1995–1998	Pinky and the Brain	The Brain	
1995–1998	Gadget Boy & Heather	Boris, Mulch and Humus, Myron Dabble, Chief Strombolli, G9	
1995–2001	The Sylvester and Tweety Mysteries	Yosemite Sam, Bingo Barker, Lojack, Sam Spade, Harry Follicle, Pjerry Nelson	
1996–2003	Dexter's Laboratory	Simion, various voices	
1996	The Tick	Hotel Manager, Handy, Human Ton, Doorman, Evil Midnight Bomber, Hotel Manager, Mr. Smarty Pants, Soren, The Deadly Bulb, Thrakkorzog's roommate	
1996–1997	Captain Simian & the Space Monkeys	Dr. Splitz, Matrix, Holo-boon 3462830, Kaz-Par, Olram	
1996–1997	The Incredible Hulk	Doctor Strange	
1996–2004	Hey Arnold!	Big Bob Pataki, various voices	
1996–1998	Stickin' Around	Additional Voices	
1997	Road Rovers	Russian President, Radio Announcer, Malcomb LaMarche	
1997	Recess	Additional Voices	
1997	Extreme Ghostbusters	Egon Spengler	
1997	The Wacky World of Tex Avery	Mooch, Emperor, Narrator, Additional Voices	
1997	King of the Hill	Professor John Lerner, Reverend Thomason	
1997	Nightmare Creatures	Narrator	Television commercial
1997–2006	Space Goofs	Etno Polino, additional voices	
1998	The Wacky Adventures of Ronald McDonald	Dr. Quizzical, Burger Chef, Knight	2 episodes
1998	Oh Yeah! Cartoons	Little Guy, Wet Guy, Circus Guy, Rothgar, Toby, Frosty the Flake, Tiger	3 episodes
1998–2000	Histeria!	George Washington, Abraham Lincoln, Woodrow Wilson, William Shakespeare, Amerigo Vespucci, Michelangelo, Socrates, Various Voices	Recurring role
1998–1999	Pinky, Elmyra & the Brain	The Brain	Main role
1998–2005	CatDog	Narrator	
1998–2005	The Powerpuff Girls	Additional Voices	Recurring role
1999	Sonic Underground	Sleet	Main role
1999–2000	Mickey Mouse Works	Mortimer Mouse	Recurring role
1999–2000	Dilbert	The World's Smartest Garbageman	
1999–2000	Sabrina: The Animated Series	Additional Voices	Recurring role
1999–2003, 2008–2013, 2023–present	Futurama	Calculon, Kif Kroker, Morbo, Lrrr, Axl Kroker, Walt, Donbot, Clamps, Hyper-Chicken Lawyer, Hedonismbot, Scoop Chang (season 5-7), Crushinator, Horrible Gelatinous Blob, Raoul, Headless Body of Spiro Agnew, Headless Clone of Spiro Agnew, Brain Spawn, "Anthology of Interest" Narrator, "The Scary Door" Announcer, George Washington's Head, George Michael's Head, Abraham Lincoln's Head, Theodore Roosevelt's Head, Charles de Gaulle's Head, Harry S. Truman's Head, Mario, Donkey Kong, Orson Welles' Head, Various Voices	Main role
2000	Hard Drinkin' Lincoln	John Wilkes Booth	
2000	Buzz Lightyear of Star Command	Ambassador	Episode: "Speed Trap"
2000–2002	Queer Duck	Oscar Wildcat, Mr. Duckstein, others	
2000–2003	Poochini's Yard	Dirt, Additional Voices	
2001	Baby Felix & Friends	Master Cylinder	
2001–2002	The Oblongs	Tommy Vinegar	
2001–2002	What's with Andy?	Principal DeRosa	Season 1
2001–2003	House of Mouse	Various Voices	
2001–2004	Jackie Chan Adventures	Ikazuki, Cardiff Zendo	Recurring role
2001–2007	Harvey Birdman, Attorney at Law	Azul Falcone, Stan Freezoid, Apache Chief, Fred Flintstone, Yogi Bear, Inch High, Speed Buggy, Hi-Riser, Doggie Daddy, Droopy Dog, Quick Draw McGraw, Wally Gator, Magilla Gorilla, Shazzan, Atom Ant, Various	Recurring role
2002	Kim Possible	Big Daddy Brotherson	
2002	Samurai Jack	The Boss, Bouncer #2	Episode: "Jack and the Gangsters"
2002–2003	Gadget & the Gadgetinis	Lt. Gadget	
2002–2004	Teamo Supremo	Baron Blitz	
2002–2008	Codename: Kids Next Door	Father, Various	Recurring role
2003–2006	The Adventures of Jimmy Neutron: Boy Genius	Zix, Various	Recurring role
2003	K10C: Kids' Ten Commandments	Omri, Amos	
2003–2004	Sabrina's Secret Life	Salem Saberhagen	
2003–2004	Stripperella	Various characters	
2004–2005	Duck Dodgers	K'chutha Sa'am, Masativo	Recurring role
2004–2006	Xiaolin Showdown	Master Fung (season 2-3), Tubbimura, Chucky Choo, Various	Main role
2004–2006	Brandy & Mr. Whiskers	Additional Voices	
2004	Party Wagon	Bumpy Snits, Ferryman, Cowpoke	Television film
2005	A.T.O.M.	Eel, Fender	
2005	The Buzz on Maggie	Additional Voices	
2005	Loonatics Unleashed	Ice Cream Vendor, Ophiuchus Sam, Pierre le Pew	2 episodes
2005	Kim Possible: So the Drama	Big Daddy Brotherson	Television film; uncredited
2005–2007	Tripping the Rift	Gus	
2005–2007	Catscratch	Hovis, Additional Voices	Main role
2005–2008	Camp Lazlo	Additional Voices	
2005–2008	My Gym Partner's a Monkey	Principal Pixiefrog, Mr. Mandrill, Mr. Hornbill, Mr. Blowhole, Various	Main role
2006–2007	Shuriken School	Mr. No, Naginata, Kubo Utamaro, Zumichito, Daisuke Togakame	
2006–2007	Class of 3000	Southern Gentleman, Mr. Beals, Killer Robot, Purple Beverage Man, Game Show Host	
2006	The Batman	Bruiser	Episode: "A Matter of Family"
2006	Codename: Kids Next Door - Operation Z.E.R.O.	Father	Television film
2007	Chowder	Additional Voices	
2007	El Tigre: The Adventures of Manny Rivera	Additional Voices	
2007–2008	Tak and the Power of Juju	Chief	Main role
2007–2009	Random! Cartoons	Klemp, Birdsdorf, Elecaptain Sam, Bjorn, Working Troll, Pickle Cop, Dog Catcher	
2008	The Marvelous Misadventures of Flapjack	Additional Voices	
2008	The Mighty B!	Additional Voices	
2008	The Boondocks	Larry King, Donald Richards	Episode: "The S-Word"
2008–2011	Back at the Barnyard	Igg, Max Fripplehoot, Termite, Gruff Announcer, Network Announcer, Albert Einstein, Captain	
2009	The Cleveland Show	Keith Leib	Episode: "Birth of a Salesman"
2009–2011	Bob & Doug	Various voices	
2010	Axe Cop Motion	Avocado Soldier	Web comic
2010–2013	Pound Puppies	Jean Luc Glaciaire, Agent Francois	
2011–2014	Adventure Time	Grand Master Wizard	
2011–2014	The Looney Tunes Show	Yosemite Sam, various voices	Main role
2011–2013	Scooby-Doo! Mystery Incorporated	Vincent Van Ghoul	
2011–2013	Generator Rex	Valve	
2011–present	American Dad!	Colonel Withersby, Uzi Knessett, Additional Voices	
2011–2016	Transformers: Rescue Bots	Police Chief Charlie Burns, Additional Voices	Main role
2012–2014	The Legend of Korra	Equalist Announcer, Defense Attorney, Aiwei, Additional Voices	
2012–2015	Robot and Monster	Gart, Perry, Loudmouth, Jerry, Nicky the Axe, Howly	
2012	The Garfield Show	Samuel W. Underburger	Episode: "The Write Stuff"
2012	Dan Vs.	Mel Darwin	
2012	Robot Chicken	The Brain, Ricky Recycle-Bin	Episode: "Eviscerated Post-Coital by a Six Foot Mantis"
2012	The Penguins of Madagascar	Various Voices	
2012	Hero Factory	Splitface	
2012	Have a Laugh!	Mortimer Mouse	
2013–2017	Ultimate Spider-Man	Doctor Doom, Doombot, Charles the Butler, Plymouth Rocker	Recurring role
2013	Mickey Mouse Clubhouse	Mortimer Mouse	Episode: "Super Adventure!"
2013	Brickleberry	Kurt Thoreau, Donnie, Steve's Dad	
2013	Hulk and the Agents of S.M.A.S.H.	Doctor Doom	Episode: "Red Rover"
2013–2014	Kung Fu Panda: Legends of Awesomeness	Heilang, Lin Kuei, Goose Twins, Pigs	
2013–2014	Avengers Assemble	Doctor Doom, Destroyer	4 episodes
2014–2026	Rick and Morty	Scary Olderson, Abrodolph Lincoler, Crocubot, Additional Voices	
2014	Nostalgia Critic	The Brain, Himself	Episode: "The Purge"
2014	Teenage Mutant Ninja Turtles	Atilla the Frog, Rasputin	Episode: "The Croaking"
2014	VeggieTales in the House	George the Cucumber	Episode: "Larry's Cousin Comes to Town"
2014–2016	The 7D	Grumpy	
2014–2016	Turbo Fast	Tickula, various voices	
2014–2017	Sonic Boom	Various voices	
2015	Star vs. the Forces of Evil	King Pony Head	Recurring role
2015–2017	Penn Zero: Part-Time Hero	Federicks, Unicorn Soldiers, Troll, Crispity Cockatoo	
2015–2018	New Looney Tunes	Yosemite Sam (season 1)	Main role
2015–2016	Gravity Falls	Additional Voices	
2016–2019	The Powerpuff Girls	Manboy	Recurring role
2016–2019	Milo Murphy's Law	Additional Voices	
2017–2019	The Lion Guard	Kifaru	
2017	Transformers: Robots in Disguise	Drag Strip, Dragbreak	Recurring role
2017	Mickey and the Roadster Racers	Omar, Morty McCool, Action Ashton, Sticky Fingers Fred	3 episodes
2017	All Hail King Julien: Exiled	Koto, Video Game Announcer, Corpse	Main role
2017	Hey Arnold!: The Jungle Movie	Big Bob Pataki, Homeless Man 1, Flunky Guard	Television film
2018	My Little Pony: Friendship Is Magic	Chancellor Neighsay	5 episodes
2018	Big City Greens	Mr. Alucard Grigorian	
2018–2023	Disenchantment	Odval, Big Jo, Leavo, various characters	Main role
2018–2020	Rise of the Teenage Mutant Ninja Turtles	Foot Brute, Mobster #1	Recurring role
2019	The Epic Tales of Captain Underpants	Tubbadump	
2019	Love, Death & Robots	Narrator	Episode: "When the Yogurt Took Over"
2019	SpongeBob SquarePants	Bus Driver	Episode: "Squid's on a Bus"
2019–2020	The Rocketeer	Sylvester Slapdash	Recurring role
2020	Amphibia	Sal	Episode: "Little Frogtown"
2020	Scooby-Doo and Guess Who?	Thraber's Ghost, Salesman, Caretaker	Episode: "The Internet on Haunted House Hill!"
2020–2023	Animaniacs	The Brain, Ian Malcolm, Cyclops, B.R.A.I.N. Bot, Alien #2, Area 51 Scientist	Main role
2021	Devil May Care	Peter	Episode: "The Shipment"
2022–2024	Mickey Mouse Funhouse	Mortimer Mouse	4 episodes
2022	Zootopia+	Mr. Big	Episode: "The Godfather of the Bride"
2023	Krapopolis	Centaur, Various	2 episodes

=== Video games ===
List of voice performances in video games
Year	Title	Role	Notes
1994	The Great Math/Word/Reading Adventure	Stinky the Skunk	
1995	Battle Beast	Toadman	
1995	Full Throttle	Nestor	
1996	Mortimer and the Riddles of the Metallion	Lodius, Humpback Whale, Lion, Oxpecker, Walrus	
1996	Arcade America	Additional Voices	
1997	Star Warped	Additional Voices	
1998	Microshaft Winblows 98	Additional Voices	
1998	The Junkyard Run	Yosemite Sam	Uncredited
1998	Animaniacs Game Pack	The Brain, Foreman, Wakko's Belches	
1998	Animaniacs: Ten Pin Alley	The Brain	
1999	Descent 3	Additional Voices	
1999	Fisher-Price: Outdoor Adventures: Ranger Trail	Ranger Rudy	
2000	Duck Dodgers Starring Daffy Duck	Yosemite Sam	
2000	102 Dalmatians: Puppies to the Rescue	Horace	
2000	Looney Tunes Racing	Yosemite Sam	
2000	Looney Tunes: Space Race	Yosemite Sam	
2000	Baldur's Gate II: Shadows of Amn	Yoshimo, Renal Bloodscalp, Chief Inspector Brega, Lloyd, Hendak	
2000	Stupid Invaders	Etno Polino, Santa Claus, Computer	
2000	Bugs Bunny & Taz: Time Busters	Yosemite Sam	
2000	Sheep Raider	Yosemite Sam	
2001	Stupid Invaders	Etno Polino	
2001	Star Trek: Starfleet Command: Orion Pirates	Additional Voices	
2002	Taz Wanted	Yosemite Sam	
2002	Disney Golf	Mortimer Mouse	
2003	Freelancer	Additional Voices	
2003	Futurama	Various Voices	
2003	Looney Tunes: Back in Action	Yosemite Sam, Blacque Jacque Shellacque	
2005	Animaniacs: The Great Edgar Hunt	The Brain, Igor	
2005	Codename: Kids Next Door – Operation: V.I.D.E.O.G.A.M.E.	Father, Burly Candy Pirate	
2006	Open Season	Boswell, Duck	
2006	The Grim Adventures of Billy & Mandy	Jack O'Lantern	
2006	Xiaolin Showdown	Master Fung	
2007	Catscratch	Hovis	
2007	Guild Wars: Eye of the North	Vekk	Expansion pack
2007	Looney Tunes: Acme Arsenal	Foghorn Leghorn, Yosemite Sam	
2007	The Simpsons Game	William Shakespeare	
2008	Harvey Birdman: Attorney at Law	Stan Freezoid, Azul Falcone, Inch High	
2008	Looney Tunes: Cartoon Conductor	Yosemite Sam, Wile E. Coyote	
2008	Crash: Mind over Mutant	Dr. Nitrus Brio	
2008	Tak and the Guardians of Gross	Chief	
2009	FusionFall	Father	
2010	Marvel Super Hero Squad: The Infinity Gauntlet	Magneto	
2011	Batman: Arkham City	Mr. Freeze, Calendar Man, Political Prisoner	
2011	Star Wars: The Old Republic	General Var Suthra	Grouped under "Additional Voices"
2012	Sorcerers of the Magic Kingdom	Horace	
2012	Kingdom Hearts 3D: Dream Drop Distance	Medium Beagle Boy	
2013	Baldur's Gate II: Enhanced Edition	Yoshimo, Renal Bloodscalp, Chief Inspector Brega, Lloyd, Hendak	
2013	Batman: Arkham Origins	Mr. Freeze, Cyrus Pinkney	Cold, Cold Heart DLC
2013–2015	Skylanders series	Night Shift, Dive Clops	
2014	Skylanders: Trap Team	Nightshift	
2015	Batman: Arkham Knight	Mr. Freeze	Season of Infamy DLC
2016	Batman: Arkham Underworld	Mr. Freeze	
2016	Kingdom Hearts HD 2.8 Final Chapter Prologue	Medium Beagle Boy	
2017	Crash Bandicoot N. Sane Trilogy	N. Brio, Lab Assistants	Excluding Warped
2020	Marvel Ultimate Alliance 3: The Black Order	Doctor Doom	Fantastic Four: Shadow of Doom expansion
2021	Crash Bandicoot: On the Run!	N. Brio	
2023	DreamWorks All-Star Kart Racing	Boss Baby (Theodore Templeton)	

=== Live-action ===
List of acting performances in film and television shows
Year	Title	Role	Notes
1989	The Super Mario Bros. Super Show!	Inspector Gadget	2 episodes
2013	I Know That Voice	Himself	Documentary film
2018	The Neighborhood	HandyRandy79	Episode: "Welcome to the Repipe"
2021	Witness Infection	Mr. Miola	Independent film
2023	Murder, Anyone?	George	Independent film

== Awards and nominations ==
Awards and nominations
Year	Award	Category	Title	Result
1998	Emmy Awards	Outstanding Performer in an Animated Program	Pinky and the Brain	Nominated
1998	Annie Awards	Voice Acting by a Male Performer in an Animated Television Production	Pinky and the Brain	Won
2000	Annie Awards	Male Voice Acting in a Feature Production	Wakko's Wish	Nominated
2011	Emmy Awards	Outstanding Voice-Over Performance	Futurama episode "Lrrreconcilable Ndndifferences"	Won
2012	Emmy Awards	Outstanding Voice-Over Performance	Futurama episode "The Silence of the Clamps"	Won
2020	Emmy Awards	Outstanding Performer in a Preschool Animated Program	The Rocketeer	Nominated
2023	Annie Awards	Outstanding Achievement for Voice Acting in an Animated Television / Broadcast Production	Zootopia+	Won
