= Queer Duck =

American animated web series

- Genre: Ribaldry; Satire; Black comedy
- Created by: Mike Reiss
- Directed by: Xeth Feinberg
- Starring: Jim J. Bullock; Kevin Michael Richardson; Billy West; Maurice LaMarche; Estelle Harris; Tress MacNeille
- Composer: Sam Elwitt
- Country of origin: United States
- No. of seasons: 1
- No. of episodes: 20

Production
- Running time: 3 minutes
- Production companies: Icebox.com; Sho.com

Original release
- Network: Icebox.com
- Release: October 11, 2000 – May 15, 2002

Queer Duck is an American adult animated web series produced by Icebox Animation that originally appeared on the company's website, then later moved to the American cable network Showtime, where it aired following the American version of Queer as Folk. Although far from featuring the first gay cartoon character, Queer Duck was among the first animated series to have homosexuality as its predominant theme.

Like several later television cartoons, Queer Duck was animated in Macromedia Flash. The show was created, written, and executive-produced by Mike Reiss, who also produced network cartoons The Simpsons and The Critic. Queer Duck animation was directed and designed by Xeth Feinberg, in an attempt to be very similar to the animation style of Rocky and Bullwinkle; the theme song was performed by drag celebrity RuPaul. In Canada, Queer Duck aired on Teletoon at Night whilst in the UK it was aired as a short segment as part of magazine show That Gay Show which aired on BBC Choice, the forerunner to BBC Three.

Scholar Lawrence La Fountain-Stokes called the use of the term queer duck as "interesting" and described the show as about a "group of American gay animals" with their personalities seemingly "based on gay white men". In 2006, a film adaptation titled Queer Duck: The Movie was released; critical reception to the film was mixed.

== Characters ==
=== Queer Duck ===
The title character, whose full name is Adam Seymour Duckstein (voiced by Jim J. Bullock), is a gay anthropomorphic duck who works as a nurse. In an interview included on the DVD release of Queer Duck: The Movie, Reiss states that Bullock is the only member of the cast that is actually gay, and that he had insisted that the character be voiced by someone gay.

Queer Duck has cyan-colored feathers, a little spiky fringe, and may wear purple eye shadow. He wears a sleeveless rainbow top and, like almost everyone else in the series, does not wear trousers. This follows the tradition of semi-nudity of cartoon animals exemplified by Porky Pig, Donald Duck, Top Cat, etc. He is often shown to have two fingers and one thumb on each hand, though on occasion he has the three fingers and one thumb per hand that is typical of many contemporary cartoons.

Queer Duck is known to gossip about anything and everything, especially on the phone while watching television, as shown on "Oh Christ!", "The Gaining of Herpes from Sparky" and "A Gay Outing". He is promiscuous in his own way, but not as obsessed with sex as his boyfriend Openly Gator; for example, he'll often utter the word "cock" but swiftly follows it with another word, like "tails", such as in "The Gay Road to Morocco".

His nemesis is known to be radio show host Laura Schlessinger, who is pictured as a haggard and ugly old woman.

Queer Duck has also been a victim of gay bashing, as shown in "Ku Klux Klan & Ollie", in which Ku Klux Klan members attempt to burn his house down. When his disguise fails, he kisses the unveiled Jerry Falwell, only to get shot down by the other homophobes. When in heaven he finds out that famous icons like Socrates and Leonardo da Vinci are also gay, much to the chagrin of Jerry Falwell.

Over the course of the series, the audience learns that Queer Duck has a Jewish mother who is in denial of his sexuality, a diabetic father (whose name is revealed to be Morty in the episode "Quack Doctor"), a straight brother named Lucky (who is shown to have bullied Queer Duck when they were younger), a nephew named Little Lucky and a lesbian sister named Melissa. Queer Duck is not the most beloved child in his family and there are strong hints that his older brother Lucky is the most favored one, due to his heterosexuality.

Queer Duck is afraid to show his sexuality to his nephew Little Lucky (who first appeared in "Fiddler on the Roofie"), especially while camping with two of Little Lucky's friends. They discovered one of his magazines, which included personal ads that contained acronyms like GBM, S&M and B&D. Lucky, however, is already aware of his uncle's sexual identity: when his fellow campers taunt him by saying, "I think your uncle is gay", Lucky answers, "Well, DUH!".

=== Other characters ===
- Openly Gator (voiced by Kevin Michael Richardson, in the style of Harvey Fierstein) is Queer Duck's boyfriend. His full name is Steven Arlo Gator. He is shy and insecure, and is usually the voice of reason whenever Queer Duck gets himself or anyone else in trouble. He marries Queer Duck in a Jewish wedding in Vermont in the episode "Wedding Bell Blues" (although they are often seen as having an open relationship); a moose was the rabbi. He works as a waiter in a restaurant that both he and Queer Duck hate.
- Bi-Polar Bear (voiced by Billy West, in the style of Paul Lynde) is one of Queer Duck's friends. He often makes bad jokes that he alone finds funny. He works in a perfume stand at a mall and has mentioned that his father is in a relationship with another man.
- Oscar Wildcat (voiced by Maurice LaMarche) is an urbane character, often portrayed as an alcoholic (he is always seen holding some form of alcohol, usually a martini). He has a deep dislike for his own mother and has implied that he would like to kill her. "If I came out it would kill mother! I'll do it tonight." He owns a Shirley Temple antique store called "Shirley You Jest". His name is a reference to Oscar Wilde.

Recurring supporting characters include Queer Duck's mother (played by Estelle Harris) and the group's nemesis, Dr. Laura Schlessinger (played by voice actress Tress MacNeille). One character, a large, well-built horse, portrays different characters in each episode. He starts out as a gay-converting Christian minister but later portrays more gay-sensitive characters, such as a flight attendant on "TWGay". Other characters who have appeared include Truman Coyote, Ricky Marlin and KY Jellyfish.

== Recurring themes ==
Although each three-minute episode stands by itself, there are several recurring themes throughout the 20-episode series, such as coming out, gay relationships/marriages, and the problems that can arise when gay and lesbian people have to interact with their straight family members. These are explored through a variety of situations: Queer Duck comes out to his parents in the first episode; in another, Queer Duck and Openly Gator get married, and it's revealed that Queer Duck has a lesbian sister; and in other episodes, Queer Duck must deal with other family members, such as his straight brother, who is much beloved by their parents.

Much like The Critic, Queer Duck features numerous "cameo" voice appearances by celebrities; these voices are impersonated by the cast. In addition to Dr. Laura, the Queer Duck gang encounter Bob Hope, Jack Nicholson, Cary Grant and Barbra Streisand, with whom Queer Duck is obsessed, as well as noted ultra-conservative preacher Jerry Falwell. These celebrities are the only human characters. All other characters are anthropomorphic animals like Queer Duck and his friends, except for the woman Queer Duck sleeps with in the final episode.

== Episodes ==
No.	Title	Original release date
1	"I'm Coming Out!"	October 11, 2000
On October 11, National Coming Out Day, Queer Duck comes out to his friends and family who already knew he was gay.
2	"Fiddler on the Roofie"	October 18, 2000
Queer Duck babysits his nephew, who finds an interesting collection of video tapes.
3	"Oh Christ"	October 25, 2000
The plans of Dr. and Mrs. Duckstein, Duck's parents, to deprogram our hero are met with fabulously entertaining results.
4	"Queer Doc"	November 1, 2000
Queer Duck pranks Dr. Laura who tries to get even by stalking him down with a double barrel shotgun. Dr. Laura ends up trying to peek through a "glory hole" and ends up "cockeyed". Queer Duck pulls off a "Daffy" when she finally catches up to him at the local bar.
5	"B.S. I Love You"	November 8, 2000
Queer Duck stands in line to see his idol Barbra Streisand. He gets tackled by her security and thrown in prison thanks to her gaydar system. Prison ends up being more of a "lucky break" however more than Queer Duck could have possibly imagined.
6	"The Gayest Place on Earth"	January 30, 2002
The Queer Gang go to a gay theme park. Queer Duck makes a pass at a sailor turkey named "Gobble - the salty Sea man" only to be thwarted by a captain (Mickey Mouse). Attractions seen are "It's a Gay World" (after all), "Butt Pirates" and several closeted stars are also caught there (Keangaroo Reeves and Ricky Marlin).
7	"Gym Neighbors"	February 6, 2002
After insulting Openly Gator's oversized derrière, and Gator's histrionics over the insult, Gator takes Queer Duck to the gym to rectify the problem. While there, Duck cruises the patrons, leaving Gator to suffer an accident on a weight bench. When the accident leaves Gator with a turned-up nose, Duck tells him it looks like Tori Spelling's. Gator returns to his melodramatic histrionics.
8	"Queer as Fowl"	February 13, 2002
While attending the funeral of H.I.V. Possum, Queer duck treats the event like a gay mixer. Queer Duck agrees, stating that "everything is a gay pickup, Desert Storm was a gay pickup." Queer Duck gets disgusted by the funeral poetry reading and turns the funeral into a gay disco. But as it turns out, Queer Duck also has a sensitive side.
9	"Wedding Bell Blues"	February 20, 2002
While flying home after attending a gay rodeo, Dr. Laura appears on the gang's airplane's wing (like a gremlin) and starts to take apart the wing. She is ultimately electrocuted. During the panic, Queer Duck makes a "deathbed promise" to marry Openly Gator. They go to Vermont to marry, by a rabbi, where Queer Duck adds a laundry list of exceptions to his vows.
10	"Ku Klux Klan and Ollie"	February 27, 2002
Queer Duck and the gang are having martinis at home when they are interrupted by the KKK. Queer Duck faces off against the unhooded Jerry Falwell and in the process of Queer Duck and Falwell's "exchange", they are offed by the other Klansmen and sent to heaven where they realize there are plenty of other gay occupants. Jerry's disdain for heaven gets him castawayed to an isolated cloud below the main "party" upstairs.
11	"The Gay Road to Morocco"	March 6, 2002
In a black-and-white parody of the film Road to Morocco, Queer Duck & the troupe offer a Gay Road to Morocco musical episode. They meet Bing Crosby and Bob Hope in the desert and are confronted by Abu Ben Dover (Cary Grant) and his army, which turns out to be a harem.
12	"Quack Doctor"	March 13, 2002
The Queer Gang go to see a gay head shrink, Dr. Ben Swine. Bi Polar Bear relates a recurring dream with Hollywood squares (true to Paul Lynde) and we learn of a dark side to Oscar Wildcat (expanded upon in episode 15). We also get a look at the hatching of Queer Duck. Finally, the anxious and insecure Openly Gator ends up with a good ol' bottle of Xanax.
13	"Oscar's Wild"	March 27, 2002
The gang attends the Oscars, meeting Joan Rivers. The event is so boring that they all fall asleep. Upon waking, they join Jack Nicholson in a spree of destruction, tearing up the theater.
14	"A Gay Outing"	April 3, 2002
While Queer Duck is watching "Drugged Out Has-Been's Week" on the Biography Channel, his nephew, a Cub Scout, reminds him of his promise to take the troop on a camping trip. The boys find a copy of Out Magazine with Barney Frank on the cover, and Queer Duck tries to explain the contents of the personal ads. In a musical number, he makes up non-sexual meanings to the abbreviations common in the ads, such as GBM, S&M, B&D, bi/curious, dyke, vamp, butch, and "water-sports".
15	"Radio Head"	April 10, 2002
Queer Duck and Openly Gator host a new radio program. First a mysterious caller calls in with a cooking question, "Oscar Mild-Cat". Finally there's a showdown with Dr. Laura, who comes out of the closet but ends up in a major "meltdown".
16	"Tales of the City Morgue"	April 17, 2002
Three short stories, including Bi Polar Bear's abduction by aliens who were hoping for a "breeder", Oscar Wildcat's creation of a "Barney Frankenstein", and Openly Gator's challenge to break Queer Duck from his Yentl addiction. Will this do in the whole Queer Gang?
17	"Homo for the Holidays"	April 24, 2002
Openly Gator and Queer Duck visit the Ducksteins for the holidays, where Dr. Duckstein tries to set up Openly Gator with Queer Duck's lesbian sister. But a fortunate wishbone break resolves the family crisis.
18	"Bi Polar Bear and the Glorious Hole"	May 1, 2002
In a parody of Winnie the Pooh, Bi Polar Bear gets stuck in Oscar Wildcat's hole and becomes very popular in the neighborhood, enjoying the "attention" of many of his neighbors.
19	"Santa Claus is Coming Out"	May 8, 2002
Queer Duck's holiday song outs Santa Claus. But when the real Santa visits Queer Duck's house on Christmas morning, Santa explains his true sexual persuasion.
20	"Mardi Foie Gras"	May 15, 2002
At Mardi Gras, the gang is hanging out on a balcony trying to get beads. Queer Duck curses Dr. Laura using voodoo, ends up smashed by a "Hurricane" (cocktail) and wakes up to find himself "deflowered" by a sexy woman.

== Reception and legacy ==
In a contemporary review for Entertainment Weekly, Richard Horrmann described the series as "hilarious" and praised its "clever animation", while noting that its interactive website attracted fans. Kate Stables of The Guardian called its theme song "catchy" and characterized the series as a "swishy funfest".

In 2007, scholar Lawrence La Fountain-Stokes wrote that he was fond of the series but shared concerns about its mixed messages. He criticized its reliance on stereotypical gay characterizations and its limited representation of racial and ethnic difference. He also found that its conception of gay culture sometimes appeared dated, while noting its engagement with contemporary issues including conversion therapy, same-sex marriage, coming out, and anti-gay political figures.

In 2005, a British public poll conducted by Channel 4 ranked Queer Duck 94th among the 100 Greatest Cartoons. In 2011, an animated Queer Duck introduction was produced for the 31st San Francisco Jewish Film Festival.

== Film ==
Queer Duck: The Movie, a film based on the animated series, was released on DVD July 18, 2006. The film reunites the original creators and cast of Queer Duck, plus special guest stars Conan O'Brien as himself; Tim Curry as Peccery the butler; Jeff Glen Bennett as the main antagonist, a homophobic bigoted priest named Reverend Vandergelding; Mark Hamill as a hot dog vendor; Bruce Vilanch as himself; Andy Dick as former drag queen Rex (formerly Regina); Jackie Hoffman as Broadway actress Lola Buzzard; April Winchell doing additional voices and David Duchovny as "Tiny Jesus". Gay-themed channel Logo premiered the film on July 16. The film concerns Queer Duck struggling with his sexuality and his love crisis between his longtime partner Openly Gator or the spunky Broadway actress Lola Buzzard.

== See also ==
- LGBTQ representation in adult animation
- LGBTQ themes in Western animation
