= Mr. Wong (web series) =

- Genre: Black comedy
- Created by: Pam Brady and Kyle McCulloch
- Voices of: Pam Brady; Kyle McCulloch
- Theme music composer: Fuzzbee Morse, Davy Jones
- Country of origin: United States
- Original language: English
- No. of seasons: 1
- No. of episodes: 13

Production
- Running time: 3–4 minutes (episodes are two parts)
- Production companies: Icebox, Mondo Mini Shows, National Lampoon

Original release
- Release: 2000 – 2001

Mr. Wong is an American adult animated web series which debuted in 2000 and lasted 14 episodes (an unaired 15th episode was made available for the DVD release). It centers around the misadventures of Wong, an elderly Chinese American butler, and the wealthy socialite WASP he works for (and endures racial abuse from), Miss Pam. He previously worked as a butler for Bing Crosby and often mourns him. It developed a cult following while being hosted on the website Icebox.com. The cartoon also drew fierce criticism from the Asian American community, who viewed it as racist.

Mr Wong's creators, Pam Brady and Kyle McCulloch, also write for the television series South Park. The DVD was released under the "National Lampoon Presents" banner.

The music for Mr. Wong was composed and performed by Fuzzbee Morse.

The theme song was sung by former Monkees lead singer Davy Jones.

== List of episodes ==
No.	Title	Link
1	"Urine Trouble, Pt. 1"	
2	"Urine Trouble, Pt. 2"	
3	"Yellow Fever, Pt. 1"	
4	"Yellow Fever, Pt. 2"	
5	"Meet the Creep, Pt. 1"	
6	"Meet the Creep, Pt. 2"	
7	"Music Video"	
8	"Treasure Cat, Pt. 1"	
9	"Treasure Cat, Pt. 2"	
10	"Treasure Cat, Pt. 3"	
11	"Gary Peterson's Wonder Wand, Pt. 1"	
12	"Gary Peterson's Wonder Wand, Pt. 2"	
13	"Gary Peterson's Wonder Wand, Pt. 3"	
14	"Stand Up For Wong!"	
15	"Granny Grabber"	

== Film ==
In September 2000 a direct to video film adaptation of Mr. Wong called "Crap Attack" was in negotiation between IceBox Incorporated and Artisan Entertainment, however, when the film was publicly announced by Artisan president Bill Block the National Council of Asian Pacific Americans initiated a letter-writing campaign that successfully convinced Artisan to drop the project. The Coalition later took out an advertisement in Daily Variety criticizing the cartoon and thanking Artisan for abandoning the movie project.

== Reception ==
The series had a negative reaction from critics in the mainstream media and Asian American groups, yet maintained a limited cult following. Scott Bass of Streaming Media described the comedy of Mr. Wong as "so edgy" that he could not "imagine seeing it on TV."

== Home video ==
In January 2004, it was reported that Mr. Wong would be receiving a home video release on DVD and VHS on February 17, 2004. The home video releases features all 14 episodes of the Mr. Wong series and includes a never-aired installment and behind-the-scenes features.
