= Icebox Animation =

American animation studio

- Website type: Animation
- Available in: English
- Website: www.iceboxanimation.com
- Registration: Optional (previews only)
- Launched: June 1, 1999; 27 years ago
- Current status: Active

icebox Animation is an animation company founded in 1999 by Steve Stanford, Jonathan Collier, Howard Gordon, Rob LaZebnik, Scott Rupp, and Tal Vigderson. The founders stated that the company was created to capitalize on the inherent "freedom of the medium" which they felt stifled creativity of writers due to the confining restrictions of the studio system and traditional media.

The most noteworthy online animation creations of the company are the controversial animated cartoon Mr. Wong and Queer Duck. Many of the founders such as Rob LaZebnik and Jonathan Collier have written and continue to contribute to and write for shows as The Simpsons in traditional media.

The company has paired with Mondo Media in a number of shows.

The original Icebox.com shut down in February 2001 after the company failed to secure additional operating capital. It was reported Icebox.com had been spending upwards of $1.4 million a month prior to its demise.

Later in 2001, the site was re-established as Icebox 2.0, LLC after several company founders bought the assets of the failed original venture, including the icebox.com domain name. The scope of the new company was greatly scaled down from its predecessor.

Many of the animated shorts on the new site were viewable only on a pay-per-view basis. The pay-per-view feature has since been removed, although many episodes of Mr. Wong Senior House and Twisted are not viewable on the site, instead Mr.Wong only available for purchase on DVD.

Currently, most of the content from the website is now available via the official YouTube channel, called Icebox.

On June 5, 2018, Icebox.com moved their website to Icebox.tv. The website is currently offline.

Dogs Playing Poker, a show based on Icebox's series Poker Night, premiered as a series of shorts on FOX on January 9, 2021.

== Animated series ==
As of 2004, Icebox had produced 22 animated web series.

- Queer Duck
- Mr. Wong
- Meet the Millers
- Hard Drinkin' Lincoln
- Poker Night
- The Elvis and Jack Nicklaus Mysteries
- The Adventures of Jesus and His Brothers
- Garbage Island
- Hidden Celebrity Webcam
- Supermodels
- Twisted
- Midge And Buck
- Heaven
- Senior House
- Starship Regulars
- Navy Bear
- Superhero Roommate
- Zombie College
- Murry Wilson: Rock 'N' Roll Dad
- Weekend Pussy Hunt
- Animal Hospital
- Investigators

== Film ==
- Queer Duck: The Movie
