= List of Rocko's Modern Life characters =

From clockwise: Bev Bighead, Ed Bighead, Filburt, Heffer, Rocko, Spunky

This is a list of all the major and minor characters from the animated television series Rocko's Modern Life and the comic book of the same name.

Joe Murray, creator of the series, said that he matched personalities of his characters to various animals, forming a "social caricature."

== Overview ==
Character	Portrayed by	Appearances							
Character	Portrayed by	First	Trash-O-Madness	Season 1	Spunky's Dangerous Day	Season 2	Season 3	Season 4	Static Cling
Main characters
Rocko Rama (né Wallaby)	Carlos Alazraqui	"Trash-O-Madness"	Main	Main	Main	Main	Main	Main	Main
Spunky	Carlos Alazraqui	"Trash-O-Madness"	Main	Main	Main	Main	Main	Main	Main
Heffer Wolfe	Tom Kenny	"A Sucker for the Suck-O-Matic"	Pictured	Main	Pictured	Main	Main	Main	Main
Edward "Ed" Bighead	Charlie Adler	"Canned"	Pictured	Main	Pictured	Main	Main	Main	Main
Beverly "Bev" Bighead	Charlie Adler	"Canned"	Pictured	Main	Pictured	Main	Main	Main	Main
Filburt Shellbach (né Turtle)	Mr. Lawrence	"Canned"		Recurring	Pictured	Main	Main	Main	Main
Dr. Paula Hutchison Shellbach	Linda Wallem	"Rinse & Spit"		Guest		Main	Main	Main	Recurring

== Main ==
=== Rocko Rama ===
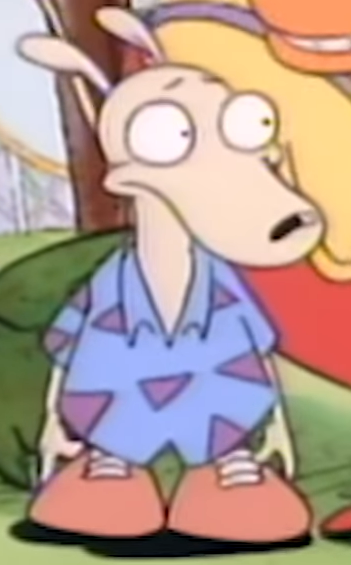
Rocko

Voiced by: Carlos Alazraqui

Rocko Rama (né Wallaby) (is a wallaby who emigrated from Australia to the United States.) He is the titular main protagonist of the show. He is a sensible, moral, and somewhat timid character who enjoys the simple pleasures in life. He is neat, compassionate, and self-conscious. Rocko wears a blue shirt with purple triangles, shoes, and no pants. Rocko works at "Kind of a Lot O' Comics" and his hobbies include recreational jackhammering and pining for the loves of his life. Due to Rocko's benevolence and non-confrontational personality, his kindness is often taken for weakness. He is often taken advantage of by the other characters. Rocko would prefer to live a quiet life, but his reckless friends often throw him into turbulent situations. His catchphrase is "[a particular occasion like garbage or laundry] day is a very dangerous day." and even once saying "Open mic night is a very dangerous night." He is often mistaken for a weasel, a kangaroo, a platypus, a beaver, or even a dog. The name "Rocko" is mononymous because the writers could not think of a surname that they liked. He is 20 years old.

=== Spunky ===
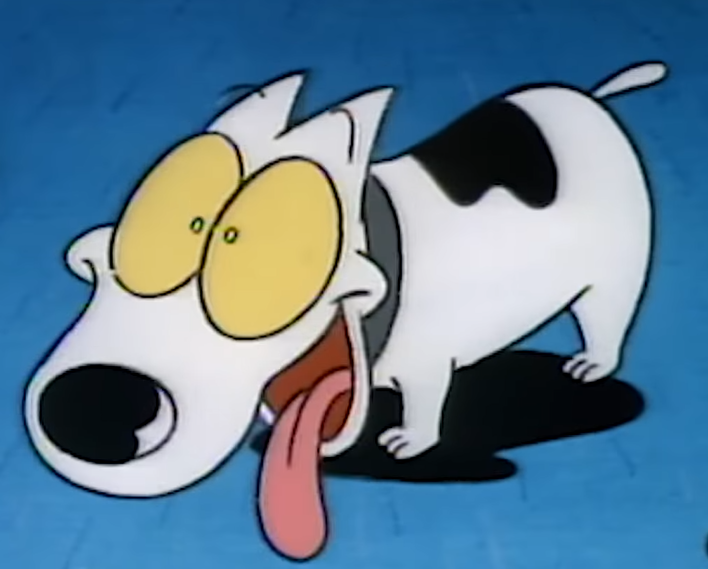
Spunky

Voiced by: Carlos Alazraqui

Spunky is Rocko's pet bull terrier. He has a very high-pitched bark and wags his tail a lot. He's not too bright and will eat anything on sight including Ed Bighead's salmon bushes and a moldy slime found in Rocko's refrigerator. He often drools into his water bowl and drinks it, only to drool into it again. He is Rocko's only regular pet and Rocko loves him dearly. Rocko will go to great lengths to protect Spunky if he is in danger or about to do something that is bad. Spunky is best remembered for falling in love with a mop in the episode "Clean Lovin'", much to Rocko's dismay, Spunky was noted to have used his front paws as hands as he tries to protect the mop. Spunky is also the home of two parasites, Bloaty and Squirmy.

Joe Murray, creator of Rocko's Modern Life, originally designed Spunky to be a dog more brain dead than the dog in his film My Dog Zero, complete with drooling and crossed eyes. Murray later decided that the scenario could "limit the storytelling," so he gave Spunky "a little more intelligence, but not much." Spunky also stars in his own game, Rocko's Modern Life: Spunky's Dangerous Day.

=== Heffer Wolfe ===
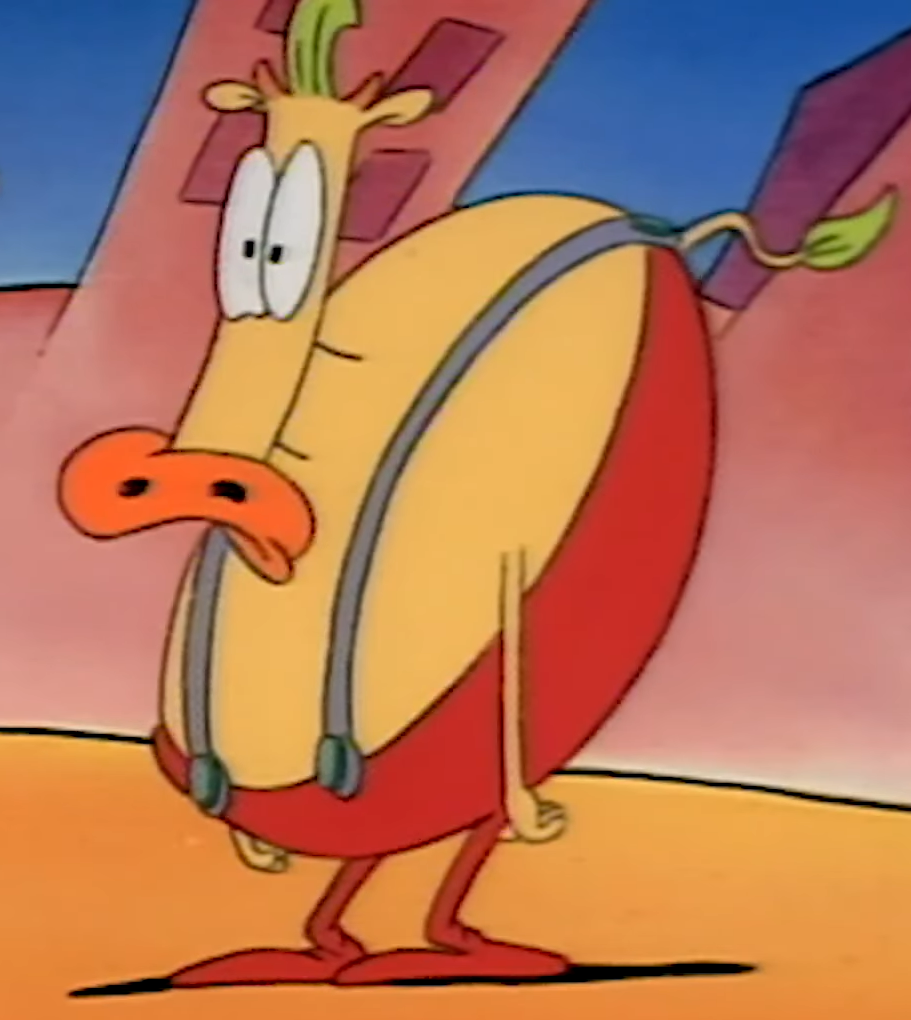
Heffer Wolfe

Voiced by: Tom Kenny

Heffer Wolfe (né Steer) is Rocko's best friend, a happy-go-lucky and not-too-bright steer whom he met in high school. His appearance is basically just a big, round, yellow bullock who wears red dungarees. He has two horns and a green tuft of hair on the top of his head. Heffer is an absolute glutton who loves to eat and party. His favorite food is Pasture Puffies. Though he is normally portrayed as being jobless, he has worked as a waiter at a coffee shop, a salesman at a tree farm, a greenskeeper at a golf course, a mail carrier, a manager at a Chokey Chicken restaurant, a paper boy, and a security guard at Conglom-O-Corp. As his family name suggests, he was raised by a family of wolves who decided not to eat him as a child and adopted him as one of their own; his "birthmark" is actually their plotting lines of how to best divide him up into choice dishes. He is often called a "Big fat cow," a term he objects to by saying "steer." His catchphrase, which can be heard at the end of the series' opening theme, is "That was a hoot!" He is 22 years old.

=== Filburt Shellbach ===
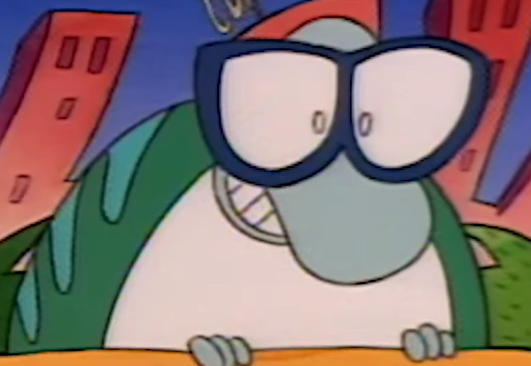
Filburt

Voiced by: Mr. Lawrence (speaking voice) and Tom Kenny (singing voice)

Filburt Shellbach (né Turtle) is Rocko's best friend, a neurotic, hypochondriac turtle. He started out as a different character, usually seen having many jobs, such as a supermarket cashier and a clerk at the Department of Motor Vehicles before being written in the storyline as Rocko and Heffer's friend in the second season. He lives in a trailer and earns his money by collecting cans "here and there" and has a penchant for "sauce". Filburt has an extremely weak stomach and even the slightest wrong movements can give him nausea. He tried to be a dentist, but he failed in his final exam when he turned one of Rocko's teeth into a Giant Mutant Tooth. He turned 21 in the episode "Born to Spawn" where he is called to his home island of Kerplopitgoes in order to become an adult. At one point, he also had a Frank Sinatra style singing voice that he nearly became a star with. He eventually started a family with Dr. Hutchison, a bubbly cat with a hook for a hand. One of their children turned out to bear a strong resemblance to Heffer, thanks to his having sat on their egg during the incubation period. Among Filburt's catchphrases are "Oh, fish sticks!", "Oh, boy.", "I'm nauseous...I'm nauseous..." and "Turn the page, wash your hands. Turn the page, wash your hands. And then you turn the page, and then you wash your hands."

=== Ed Bighead ===
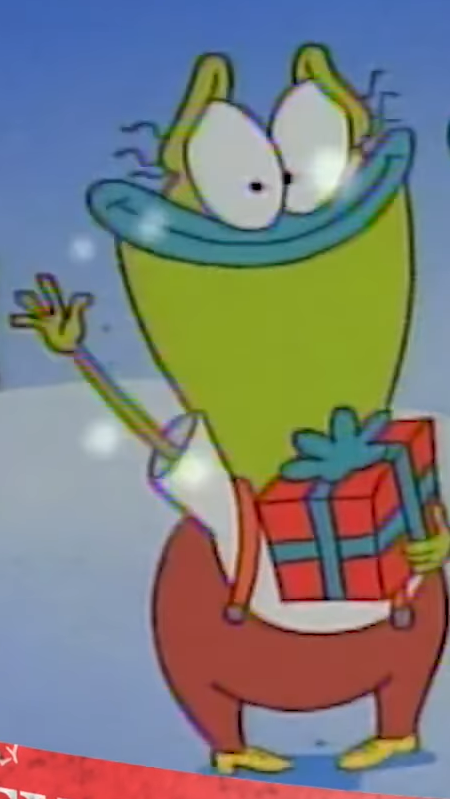
Ed Bighead

Voiced by: Charlie Adler

Edward "Ed" Bighead is an anthropomorphic middle-aged cane toad and the husband of Bev Bighead. He is also the main antagonist of the show. Joe Murray said that he based the Bigheads on a group of neighbours who lived next door to Murray during his childhood. Murray described the neighbours as "grumpy and pissed about everything." Joe Murray hated his neighbours. The general concept involving characters with large heads originated from a comic, written by Murray, named "Rizzo the Art Director." This character is also green due to Joe Murray's dislike and disassociation for the color.

Ed Bighead lives next door to Rocko, who he despises and sees him and his friends as the bane of his existence. In the television show, Ed is grumpy and crass towards most people. He works at the large corporation Conglom-O, where has he worked since 1961. His position with the company is usually in middle management, but it can be almost every position from assembly-line worker to an executive role depending on the needs of the episode. According to his nameplate at Conglom-O, his job title is "Toad". As seen in the episode "Sailing the Seven Zzz's", he is a sleepwalker and has the habit of turning into a pirate while sleepwalking and views people and things as their pirate equivalents, he believed Rocko was an enemy pirate and proceeded to launch various household objects such as toasters and bowling balls at Rocko's house from a dryer. In the comic book, Ed works for a similar company headed by Donald Frump, an elephant that serves as a parody of Donald Trump. Ed seems to have bad luck wherever he goes and thus is very cynical. His catchphrase is "I hate my life."

He had an estranged relationship with his child born as Ralph, who created a show called "The Fatheads," which was loosely based on the Bigheads. Ralph also becomes a cartoonist instead of following Ed's footsteps at Conglom-O, which caused Ed to deny he had a "son". Ralph eventually came out as transgender under the name Rachel in Rocko's Modern Life: Static Cling and although Ed was not accepting at first, he later accepted the transition.

=== Bev Bighead ===
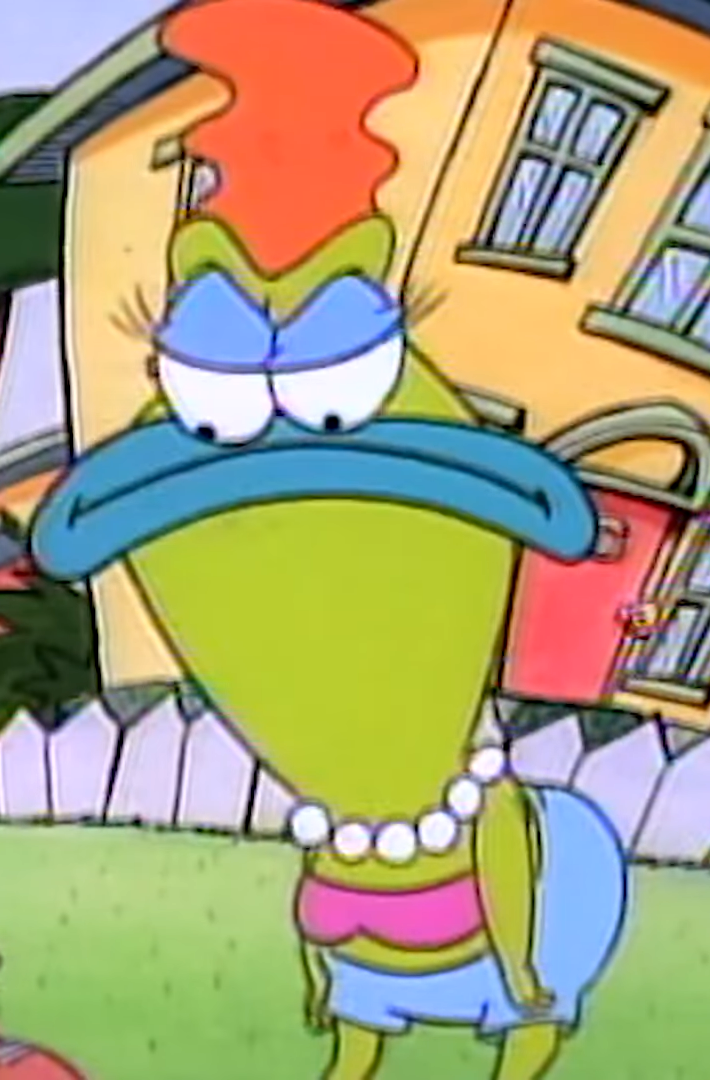
Bev Bighead

Voiced by: Charlie Adler

Beverly "Bev" Bighead is a female character of the series. She is a Harvey Fierstein-esque raspy-voiced cane toad and Ed's wife. Bev assumes authority in the Bighead household. Unlike her husband, she enjoys the company of Rocko, Heffer, and Filburt. She is a party animal who enjoys cooking and sunbathing nude. There is evidence that she sees Rocko as more than a neighbor and wants to have an affair with him and she has tried to seduce Rocko on more than one occasion, resulting in Rocko seeing her naked numerous times. She also is a possible sadomasochist—she sleeps on sharp objects and has been impaled in the back with a lawn dart by Rocko, but was unaffected by it. At one point, she took over Ed's job at Conglom-O for a week when Ed took a leave of absence due to a nervous breakdown and ran the company very well. Her favorite bedroom pastime with Ed is to make him crack plates in mid-air with his tongue like clay pigeons.

Bev is also an incredibly compassionate toad, having taken Earl the vicious dog in when she forces him into a submissive posture for digging out their yard, she falls in love with him and likewise, which is strange for Earl. Earl and Ed then vie against one another for Bev's attention and approval, which Ed ultimately loses due to his underhandedness. Fortunately, Earl is gone in subsequent episodes and his adoption is for the most part retconned through the rest of the series.

== Recurring ==
=== Dr. Paula Hutchison Shellbach ===
Voiced by: Linda Wallem

Dr. Paula Hutchison Shellbach, or Hutch for short, is a yellow cat that works as dentist, Hutch has also been a cashier, surgeon, veterinarian, obstetrician, and pharmacist. She jokingly admits she left her job as a dentist because she was "Getting tired of looking down in the mouth!" and as a surgeon when she admits she "Just couldn't cut it!" She has very big teeth when she grins and very upbeat outlook on life. She has a hook for her right hand which does not hinder her normal activity in any way. Her hook was also used to defeat the Giant Mutant Tooth. Hutch took a liking to Filburt and has encouraged him to do various things he is afraid of and eventually married him. Hutch's mother, Widow Hutchison, disallows the wedding between the two because of her belief that "cats and turtles don't mix" citing their status as natural enemies. While both Filburt and Hutch's families fight each other, it turns out that Hutch's father Colonel Frank Hutchison, who was thought to be dead, is actually a turtle, meaning that Widow Hutchison did not want her daughter to marry Filburt because she was trying to protect her.

Hutch's catchphrase is "'kay?", said while tilting her head. In "Sailing the Seven Zzz's", Rocko did this in the same fashion. She was the prom queen of O-Town High School. Hutch also seems to have a number of odd quirks, including the fact that she claimed to keep a baboon heart under her pillow. The team created Dr. Hutchison after Murray attended a press conference for networks to market new seasons of television shows to the press. A reporter asked Murray why the show did not have any "positive female role models." Murray responded by stating that he had no positive role models, that people do not use cartoon characters as role models, and that television shows should not teach lessons. After the conference some Nickelodeon executives told the reporter that they had plans to place female role models in the television show and asked Murray to place an unused character, Magdalane, as a female role model. Murray refused to use Magdalane. A female executive from Nickelodeon later requested "a professional woman, someone with a good hook." The executive intended for the "good hook" to be a personality trait that attracts viewers; Murray instead gave the doctor a literal hook. Murray and the directors "grew to love her." Martin Olson, a writer, described the decision when Nickelodeon gave the "okay" for the marriage of Filburt and Paula Hutchison as one of the most memorable moments of the production. Olson said that the executives at first did not like the marriage idea which he came up with in his outline of "The Big Question"; linear character development did not exist in Nicktoons. Murray convinced the executives to allow for the marriage to occur.

=== Rachel Bighead ===
Voiced by: Joe Murray

Rachel Bighead (née Ralph Bighead) is Ed and Bev's only child. During the original series, their child was named Ralph Bighead. Disowned by Ed for not wanting to work for Conglom-O, the young Bighead went to Holl-o-Wood, a parody of Hollywood to become a cartoonist, eventually creating a cartoon called The Fatheads (who are both voiced by Charlie Adler), a married couple with obese heads that constantly fight and hit each other with parking meters. The Fatheads were based loosely on Ed and Bev. Rocko and his friends are fans of the show.

By the time Rocko and his friends return to Earth in Static Cling, the character has come out as a transgender woman, still living in the desert, now named Rachel Bighead.

Creator Joe Murray provides the voice of the character as both Ralph and Rachel. Writer Martin Olson created Ralph and based the character's personality on Joe Murray's personality, Olson also used the character to satirize Murray's experiences with Nickelodeon. When Murray created the first episode with Ralph, the directors and artists, enamored with the story, became involved in the production. Olson asked Murray to voice Ralph. On his website Murray wrote, "I don't consider myself a voice actor, but this one I did."

According to Olson, Doug Lawrence persuaded Murray into yelling "Never never never never!" as the character's voice. Olson found this humorous as, according to him, Murray "Never ever screamed." Olson describes Murray's voice as "a quiet, thoughtful murmur" and therefore found "Joe as his alter ego screaming like a nut" to be humorous.

=== Bloaty the Tick and Squirmy the Ringworm ===
Voiced by: Tom Kenny (Bloaty), Carlos Alazraqui (Squirmy)

Bloaty the Tick and Squirmy the Ringworm are two parasites who live on and in Spunky. Certain episodes and both stories in Issue 6 of the comic book, "Special Disgusting Parasite Issue!", revolve around their Odd Couple-like relationship. They are introduced in the first season episode "Dirty Dog", in which their boss, Mr. Ick, comes over for dinner while Rocko tries to give Spunky a bath. This episode suggests that more than one parasite is living on Spunky, proven in future episodes by huge crowds of insects and even an old-west style town on Spunky's body. One of Bloaty and Squirmy's more well known sayings is "Up, work, home, TV, bed!". In the first story of Issue 6 of the comic, "Bug Out!", the two hop between various pets, trying to find the perfect host. In the second story, "Lice on the Loose", the two again find Spunky, prompting Rocko to take Spunky to a pet store, Bloaty and Squirmy interact with local parasites at the store.

Writer Martin Olson created Bloaty and Squirmy. Olson loved Murray's character designs of Bloaty and Squirmy, and said that he and the crew "had tons of fun recording and singing my nutty "Bloaty and Squirmy Theme Song" (a parody of the theme song from The Patty Duke Show).

=== Chuck and Leon Chameleon ===
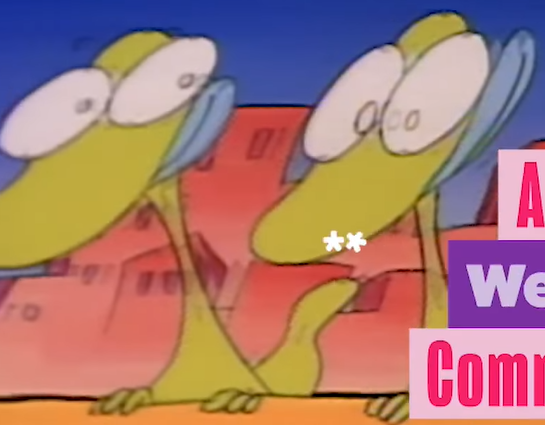
The Chameleon Brothers

Voiced by: Tom Kenny (Chuck), Carlos Alazraqui (Leon)

Chuck and Leon Chameleon are identical twin chameleons who speak in a Scandinavian accent and have snooty attitudes. They became a running gag, having several odd jobs such as being gym owners, running a client agency for clients who need help to break bad habits, running a hair salon and owning a café. Most if not all of these establishments are by their own admissions very exclusive. They say that they once worked for a tsar in the fictional country Balzak before immigrating to America with their socks on their feet.

Both brothers appear in the second story of Issue #1 once. They never speak and are never identified by their names.

=== Conglomo Lizards ===
Voiced by: Tom Kenny, Carlos Alazraqui, Doug Lawrence, and Charlie Adler

The Conglomo Lizards are lizards that work where Ed Bighead works, Conglom-O. They appear quite often.

=== Mr. Dupette ===
Voiced by: Charlie Adler

Antioch C. Dupette Also known as "Mr. Dupette" is a yellow alligator that is the CEO of Conglom-O, the megacorporation whose motto is "We Own You". Prior to this, he is the manager at Super Lot-O Comics in the episode "Canned", where he fires Rocko. It is unknown precisely when or how he became the CEO of Conglom-O. Some episodes showing flashbacks to Conglom-O's early years, such as when Rachel Bighead turned down her father's offer of a job at the company, remain consistent with Dupette's original appearance in "Canned", while others depict him as being with Conglom-O during events set well before the events of Canned. He also served as the main antagonist of Rocko's Modern Life: Static Cling.

Dupette is almost always shown picking his nose, although sometimes he has a personal assistant pick his nose for him (most of the time, his right-hand man, Mr. Noway). Despite his official job title of "Slimy Boss" and propensity for firing executives on a whim for the most insane reasons, Dupette is a staunch environmentalist thanks to Rocko's efforts (in the episode "Zanzibar") and he also secretly enjoys performing as a clown at children's birthday parties (in the episode "Closet Clown"). He is also a golf pro and, as his original job suggests, a big comic book fan.

In the comic book, Dupette appears in the second story of Volume #1 and is never identified by name. In the comic, Donald Frump serves as Mr. Bighead's boss.

=== Earl Bighead ===
Voiced by: Carlos Alazraqui

Earl is a large purple bulldog. He has yellow eyes, red hair and large lower teeth that protrude from his mouth and wears a spiked dog collar. He was initially homeless and is occasionally locked up at Dr. HP Marten's Institute for Questionable Experiments due to his viciousness. Earl enjoys mauling Rocko, Ed Bighead, the fly man and basically anything else that is alive. He was adopted by Bev in the second season after his "fairy dogmother" frees him from Martens' lab. Ed hates him and he hates Ed, but is loving towards Bev.

Despite appearing in the opening for the show, after the first season, Earl appeared seldom.

=== Gladys the Hippo Lady ===
Voiced by: Charlie Adler

Gladys the Hippo Lady is a sunglasses-wearing, spandex stretch pants sporting hippopotamus with whom Rocko would often collide in Season 1 episodes and get in her way. She would utter her catchphrase, "How dare you!" at this juncture, which is always in a deep, manly voice, in total contrast to her unnerving high-pitched voice. In the episode, "Dumbells", she drags Rocko on a "ding-dong ditch" frenzy after catching Rocko, Heffer, and Filburt trying to pull the prank on her and finds it hilarious. In her first episode on the beach, she briefly apologized to Rocko when she asked him to help her apply sunscreen.

Gladys appears in the comic book "This Is A Test!", the second story of Issue #1, and "Remote Controlled", the first story of Issue #4. Gladys appears in the background in "This Is A Test!" In "Remote Controlled", an unidentified passerby bumps into her, causing Gladys to yell her trademark phrase at the man.

=== Melba Toast ===
Melba Toast is a mysterious female character who happens to be one of Rocko's love-interests and the next door neighbor in the television show and comic. Rocko falls head over heels for her but never sees her. Melba's face is never seen in the television show, nor in the comic. In the comic Melba is portrayed as a famous and high-class hand model for beauty products for the hands and feet.

=== Garbage Strike Rats ===
Voiced by: Carlos Alazraqui and Tom Kenny

The Garbage Strike Rats are obese rats who formerly were employed as sanitation workers, but are currently striking. They first appear in the episode "Popcorn Pandemonium" in a trailer for the film "Garbage Strike: The Musical". They have made various cameo appearances throughout the series. They even appear in the pilot episode, "Trash-O-Madness", as garbage men. One of them, Tyrone, takes on the role of "the Big Fairy of Bigland" in Rocko's dream in "Short Story".

=== Really Really Big Man ===
Voiced by: Tom Kenny

Really Really Big Man, also known as Big Man or RRBM for short, is an extremely large and strong possibly humanoid superhero. In most episodes that revolve around him, he shows incredible but uncontrollable strength. His superpowers include flight, magic chest hairs, nipples that allow people to see their future (by attaching them to the eyeballs), and super strength. His alter-ego is a cross-gender office worker named "Lois Lame" (a parody of Lois Lane from Superman). His catchphrase is "Gaze into my nipples of the future!".

=== Slippy the Slug ===
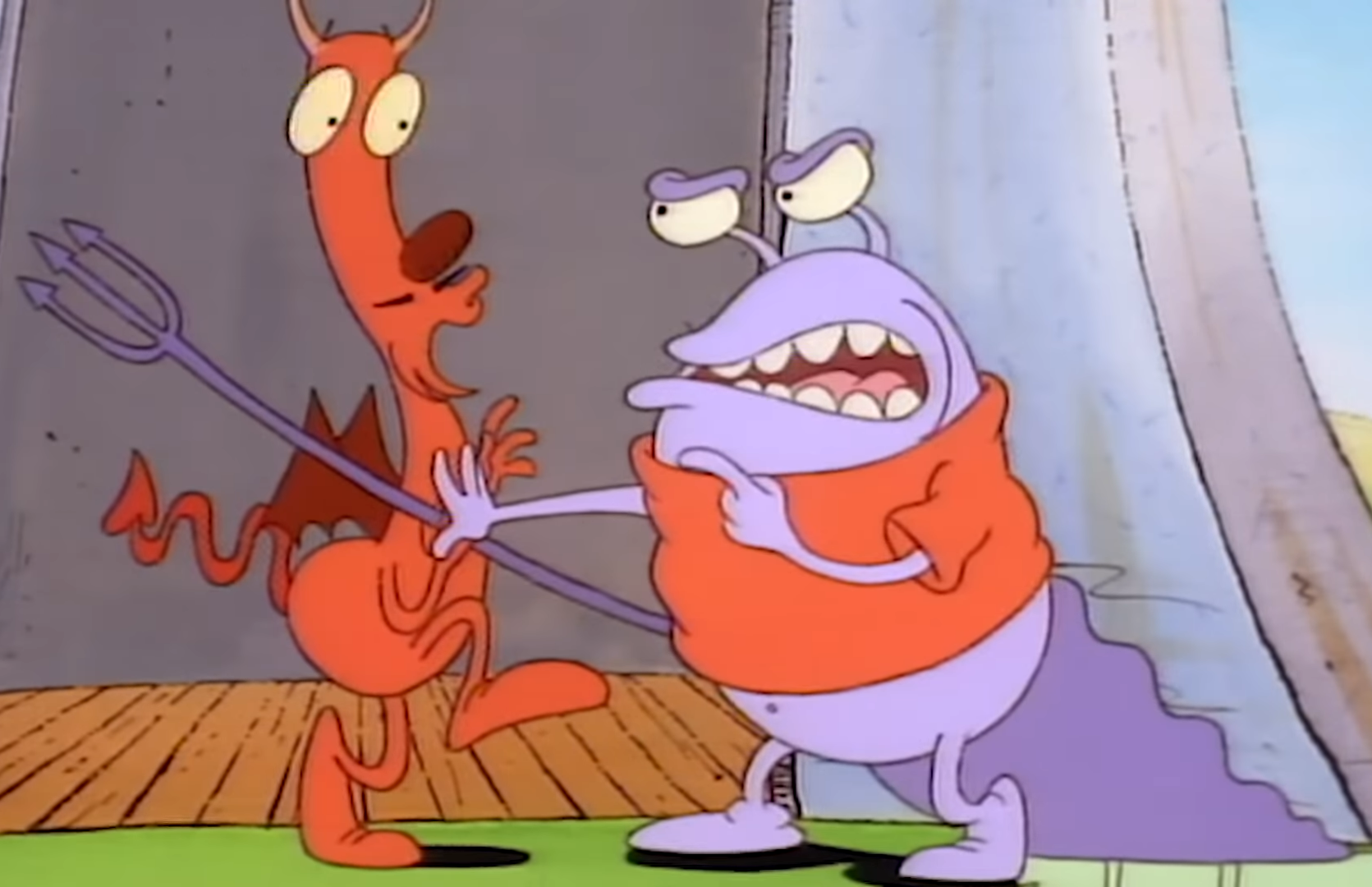
Slippy the Slug reprimanding Satan

Voiced by: Dom Irrera (first voice), Carlos Alazraqui (second voice)

In the television show, Slippy the Slug manages the city dump. Before that, he ran a dangerous carnival sponsored by the sewage treatment center called the Carnival O' Knowledge. After the episode "Carnival Knowledge" Slippy rarely appeared. Murray said that Slippy did not become fleshed out to his liking. In the television show he made occasional appearances after Season 1.

Slippy appears in the second story of Issue #1 and the first story of Issue #7; in Issue #7 he operates a "Slippy the Slug's Sales for Suckers" booth at the Humongo Comicon.

=== Ambulance Beavers ===
Voiced by: Tom Kenny

The Ambulance Beavers are a running gag. They are two beavers who appear when a character is seriously injured. However, instead of taking the character who is hurt off on a stretcher, they take the inanimate object the character was injured on. An example is when Rocko crashes his bumper car at the carnival, the Ambulance Beavers take away the car instead of Rocko. When Rocko's appendix was hurting him, he fell off his jackhammer and they took the jackhammer instead of Rocko. In the same episode, they took Heffer, after they were told to (and they actually got it right), for emergency hippo-suction (liposuction) after he rushed to the hospital with Rocko in tow. Their catchphrase is saying "Hup!" repeatedly, while carrying a stretcher, loading the object on, and driving off to the hospital.

=== William "Buddy" Gecko ===
Voiced by: Tom Kenny (speaking voice), Les Brown Jr. (singing voice)

William "Buddy" Gecko is Filburt's musical gecko idol. He sings "Come Crawl with Me" with Filburt in "The Lounge Singer". He makes various cameos throughout the series. He is very kind to Filburt, he provided him with a pair of record phones to help him feel less stage fright. "Come Crawl with Me" is a parody of the Frank Sinatra song "Come Fly with Me".

=== Crazy Aunt Gretchen ===
Voiced by: Linda Wallem

Crazy Aunt Gretchen is Filburt's crazy grumpy aunt who never came out of her tank, so as an adult, she has her arms and legs sticking out of it and water sloshing on everyone she passes. She appears in "Sugar Frosted Frights", where it's revealed that she babysat young Filburt and told him all kinds of horror stories about Halloween, contributing to his fear of Halloween. Crazy Aunt Gretchen hates Halloween. She then later attended Filburt and Dr. Hutchison's wedding in "The Big Answer". She gets electrocuted by an O-Phone in Static Cling.

=== Filburt and Dr. Hutchison's children ===
Voiced by: Doug Lawrence, Tom Kenny, Carlos Alazraqui, and Linda Wallem

Gilbert, Shelbert, Norbert and Missy are the 4 children of Filburt and Dr. Hutchison, who all came from the same egg in the fourth season. Gilbert and Shelbert look exactly like Filburt while Missy is a miniature version of Dr. Hutchinson. Norbert, on the other hand oddly resembles Heffer since he sat on the egg for Filburt. He also believes that Rocko is his father and constantly follows him around. For most of the series, the four are featured as babies, they appear once as teenagers in the episode "Future Schlock".

=== Flecko ===
Voiced by: Tom Kenny

Flecko is a fly, who appears in the episodes "Day of the Flecko", in which he is a prolonged nuisance to Rocko as the latter tries to get to sleep, "Fly Burgers", in which he sues Rocko after feigning serious injury and "Rocko's Happy Vermin" where he saves the rest of his bug friends. He has a glass eye that always falls out. He is the creation of Timothy Björklund and writer Martin Olson.

=== Buff and Dick ===
Buff the bull and Dick the gorilla are two irritating, insulting employees at the O'Town Hospital. They first appeared together in "Tickled Pinky". They also appear occasionally in the series. Dick was one of the monster truck drivers, in "Driving Mrs. Wolfe", Buff can be seen in the crowd of customers, "Dear John".

=== Frank and Widow Hutchison ===
Frank and Widow Hutchison are Dr. Hutchison's parents and Filburt's in-laws. The Col. Sanders-esque owner of an ice cream company, he sits in a wheelchair with a nurse, named Magnolia, accompanying him. He appears in "The Big Answer" and encounters his wife, Widow Hutchison (who has two hooks), at Filburt and Dr. Hutchinson's wedding. The Widow Hutchison exhibits anger towards him throughout the episode and in the previous "The Big Question" episode because Frank left her. At the end of "The Big Answer" the Widow Hutchison tells Frank, "Frankie, wait! I still love you!" Widow Hutchinson is voiced by Kevin Meaney, and Frank Hutchinson is voiced by Carlos Alazraqui. Ironically, he is a turtle despite the Widow Hutchison's prejudice against them. Widow Hutchinson didn't want her daughter to date or marry Filburt because she was afraid that Dr. Hutchinson would get hurt.

=== The Hopping Hessian ===
A parody of the Headless Horseman, The Hopping Hessian is a one-legged ghost from the Revolutionary War who lurks beyond the old Foto-Hut. Gordon, the talking leg, is the Hessian's missing leg who sounds like Johnny Carson, and has a face on his foot. He was created by Doug Lawrence in a story by Martin Olson. The Hopping Hessian is also voiced by Lawrence, while Gordon is voiced by Carlos Alazraqui. The Hopping Hessian rarely speaks; he only says "Yes!" or "No!", agreeing with Gordon on something (initially, he only said this off-screen, until he was first revealed in "Sugar Frosted Frights".)

=== Peaches ===
Voiced by: Tom Kenny

Peaches is a parody of Satan who is pink-skinned and clad in black robes, Peaches is in charge of "Heck", a parody of Hell (which he claims appears infernal "for the tourists") which Heffer almost pointed out before being interrupted. By taking off his hood, he reveals his head disturbingly resembling cow udders. Despite his menacing appearance and given his authority, Peaches has an "average Joe" tone and likes playing with a paddle ball. He has attempted to lure Heffer into "Heck" several times but has repeatedly failed to do so. Due to his failures, he was punished by being forced to star in his own cartoon show Peaches' Modern Life.

When writer Martin Olson created the story for "To Heck and Back", he had "Satan" originally in charge of Heck. Director Jeff "Swampy" Marsh says Doug Lawrence named Peaches and "never explained the udders (or many other things he thought up) to anyone. It was just funny, and that was explanation enough."

=== Rocko's Car ===
Voiced by: Linda Wallem

Rocko's car is the vehicle that he uses to travel around O'Town. While it typically acts as a car, some episodes depict it as a living and animated object. For example, when the car breaks down due to mechanical issues, it has a "soul" that flies away as an angel, almost running into the Grim tow-truck. Upon getting fixed, its soul returns to the vehicle and is subsequently resurrected. On another episode, when the car had been towed away, it called Rocko from a telephone booth at the impound in order to ask for bail.

=== Rocko's Parents ===
Rocko's Parents are a family of wallabies living in Australia. They have unknown family name. Rocko's family can be seen on a family photo on his table. They must have had another baby because in one episode Rocko had read a letter from them that was signed by a silly name suited for a baby. Obviously, Rocko wasn't familiar with the name. Rocko loves his parents. They make an appearance in the pilot episode in Rocko's flashbacks and in a different photo. From the picture, Rocko's father must be strict and manly and his mother must be kind and confident. They are much like Heffer's parents. They didn't speak in the series.

=== Winnifred Wolfe ===
Winnifred Wolfe is an older wolf and Hiram Wolfe's love interest, from back in their high school days. He had a crush on her, but she did not reciprocate those feelings because of his unfortunate tendency to put himself first. She is reunited with him during a senior singles cruise in the two-part episode "Cruisin'". It is not known what becomes of her relationship with him, as Hiram does prove that he can think of others as well when he saves Rocko. While she is undoubtedly very old, her exact age is never revealed, but was said to be in her prime some time in the 1940s or 1950s. She attended Ozark Tech along with Hiram Wolfe.

=== Seymour ===
Voiced by: Charlie Adler (first voice), Carlos Alazraqui (second voice)

Seymour is a crazy old ram who claims he has boils on his butt that are bigger than Rocko in "Tickled Pinky". Seymour also made an appearance during the song "Spring Cleaning", in "Zanzibar".

=== Mr. Smitty ===
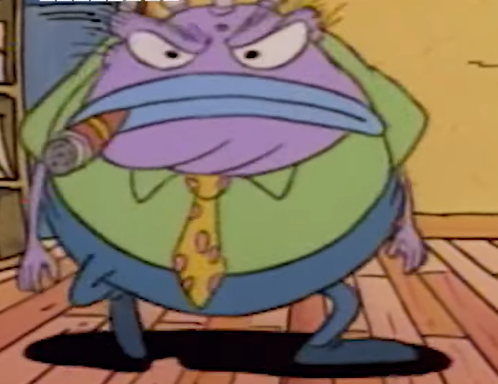
Mr. Smitty

Voiced by: Tom Kenny

Mr. Smitty is Rocko's boss at Kind of a Lot o' Comics. He is a purple toad with obvious hair plugs and is always seen smoking a cigar. He seems to either fire Rocko or make his job difficult in almost every episode he appears in, and is even rude to his customers. In the episode "Commuted Sentence", it is revealed that his house is next door to Kind of a Lot o' Comics, and he still drives to work despite being so close. The only thing Mr. Smitty truly cares about is his car, which got towed by Rocko for a parking violation. This forces him to head to the impound lot to try and get it back. The director there had no patience for Mr. Smitty's tyrannical nature and forced him to rethink his behavior. Rocko often refers to Mr. Smitty as "a smoldering old toad", and is the only character in the series that Rocko openly dislikes. His tyrannical, aggressive nature and short temper are apparently the result of "the green button" on his office chair. In the episode "Power Trip", Rocko is temporarily appointed manager of the comic store and, after pressing "the green button" his personality changes to match Mr. Smitty's. Mr. Smitty also made is unvoiced physical cameo appearance as in Static Cling, in which it is unknown what he does for his work right now ever since Kinds of a Lot of Comics was replaced with an instant print kiosk.

=== Tammy the Pig ===
Voiced by: Linda Wallem

Tammy is a member of the female bowling team in "Gutter Balls". She also first appears in "Popcorn Pandemonium", ordering a huge amount of junk food at the concession stand, then getting a diet soda "to watch her girlish figure". Later, she mistakes Rocko for an usher (they all wear his shirt), and makes him hit a rude cigar-smoking patron with a flashlight. Tammy has a Southern accent.

=== The Grim Recycler ===
Voiced by: Tom Kenny

The Grim Recycler is the parody of The Grim Reaper, and he appears during the song "Recycle", in "Zanzibar". He is also one of the jury in "Dumbells", reading a book (trying to entertain himself). The Grim Recycler seems to be a celebrity because in the song "Recycle", he says "No autograph's please". Due to his name, he likes to recycle.

=== Tiger ===
Voiced by: Tom Kenny

Tiger is a muscular purple tiger with a patch over one eye, a jock and the prom king of his and prom queen Paula Hutchinson's High School, he earns Filburt's jealousy in the episode "The Big Question" in which Filburt hopes to propose to her, but he instead is looking to help Paula in proposing to Filburt.

=== Wild Pig ===
Voiced by: Charlie Adler

Wild Pig is a movie star wild boar and a very minor character whose catchphrase is, "I'm a wild pig!". He has made various cameos since his debut in the episode "Skid Marks".

=== The Wolfe Family ===
==== Cindy Wolfe ====
Voiced by: Linda Wallem

Cindy Wolfe voiced by Linda Wallem is Peter and Heffer's sister. Usually a background character, she speaks in a voice reminiscent of a valley girl. She is a parody of female teenagers and their tendency to gravitate towards over-dramatic rebelliousness and unusual fads or phases, such as the time she took a (revealed later to be temporary) vow of silence. She also sometimes wears crazy outfits that are supposed to be "in-fashion" at the time. She goes into fits when she believes that her parents are fighting.

==== George Wolfe ====
Voiced by: Charlie Adler

George Wolfe is the temperamental father of Heffer, Cindy, and Peter. He does have a rarely seen soft side, such as his secret support of Heffer's joining the Weasel Scouts. He is constantly angry even at his wife and rarely smiles, much like his father. At family dinners, he almost always ends up screaming at another family member or guest. He is also extremely protective of his car, even guarding the keys from the rest of the family with a laser grid security system.

==== Hiram Wolfe ====
Voiced by: Charlie Adler

Hiram William Wolfe is George's father, Virginia's father-in-law, and the paternal grandfather of Heffer, Cindy, and Peter. He is very old, and though his exact age is never revealed, he was in his prime in the 1940s, according to the second season episode "Cruisin'". This would put him at around 80 years old. His eyesight, coordination, and bladder control are all suffering, and he cannot chew solid food. He relies on his cane or wheelchair to get around. He hates wallabies and acts hostile towards Rocko, but because of his incredibly poor eyesight he mistakenly believes that Rocko is a beaver, However, he fails to realize Rocko is a wallaby when he is briefly turned young while in the Bermuda Triangle and even risks his life to save Rocko (who had become old) from drowning. He was also in love with Winifred Wolfe when he attended Ozark Tech, although she rejected him because of his self-centered attitude, however she is later impressed when Hiram risks his life while trying to save Rocko while their cruise ship is in the Bermuda Triangle and even comes to Hiram's rescue.

In Static Cling, as 20 years have passed, Grandpa Wolfe has since died and his ghost is floating around O-Town, although, since he is senile, he is oblivious to this fact.

==== Peter Wolfe ====
Voiced by: Mr. Lawrence

Peter Wolfe is Cindy and Heffer's brother. His voice is a deeper, male version of Cindy's and, also like Cindy, parodies rebellious teenage male behavior. He was primarily used for a background character, but also became part of long-running but rarely seen gag that implies that he is a crossdresser. Peter dropped out of school two years ago and became a cheerleader.

==== Virginia Wolfe ====
Voiced by: Linda Wallem

Virginia Wolfe is the compassionate mother of Heffer, Cindy, and Peter with a nervous facial tic, a thick midwestern accent, and crazed driving skills. Her trademark is to make a strange grinding noise with her teeth. Her name comes from the English novelist Virginia Woolf.

==== Grandma Wolfe ====
Voiced by: Tom Kenny

Grandma Wolfe was the deceased grandmother on George's side of the family and the rude wife of Hiram Wolfe and the grandmother of Heffer, Cindy, and Peter. She appears to be very old and bitter and has no soul, as she is spending her afterlife in Heck. In the episode "Heff in a Handbasket", when Peaches tried to keep Heffer in Heck for all eternity after he sold his soul, he is stopped by Grandma Wolfe who refuses to spend her afterlife with Heffer, and she eats his contract.

==== Mr. Bull ====
Voiced by: Mr. Lawrence

Heffer's biological father, Mr. Bull is seen in the episode "Who's For Dinner?" when Heffer runs away from home in search of his "real" family. He appears to have a little patience for his son, and even screams at him that "Your mother's a car seat in Illinois!".

== Proposed characters ==
=== Magdalane ===
Magdalane "Maggie" Rama is Rocko's older sister. She has two children, including one boy and one girl.

Murray included her in early presentations of the Rocko's Modern Life concept. When Murray further developed the concept, he decided that the show would carry more effect if Rocko had no family in O-Town. Murray wrote an episode script, titled "Wake Up Maggie", which portrays Magdalane suffering from narcolepsy. Murray stated that Nickelodeon believed the episode to be "a bit odd" while he believed that the episode was "touching."

According to Murray, when he attended a press conference for networks to market new seasons of television shows to the press, a reporter asked him why the show did not have any "positive female role models". Murray said that he responded by stating that he had no positive role models, that people do not use cartoon characters as role models, and that television shows should not teach lessons. According to Murray, after the conference some Nickelodeon executives told the reporter that they had plans to place female role models in the television show and asked Murray to place Magdalane as a female role model. Murray said that he refused to use Magdalane and never used her in Rocko's Modern Life.

Despite not appearing in the series, she made a few cameo appearance, appearing much younger than Rocko in contrast to what Murray originally intended. In "Trash-O-Madness", she is seen in Rocko's family photo inside her mothers pouch, and also appeared in a flashback "Wimp on the Barby" where Rocko was saying goodbye to his entire family while running from Dingo.
