= Filburt =

Fictional character

Filburt Shellbach
- Rocko's Modern Life character
- First appearance: Canned (1993)
- Created by: Joe Murray
- Voiced by: Mr. Lawrence (speaking); Tom Kenny (singing)

In-universe information
- Full name: Filburt Shellbach (né Turtle)
- Species: Turtle
- Gender: Male
- Occupation: Various
- Family: Unnamed father Unnamed mother
- Spouse: Paula Hutchison (wife)
- Children: Shellbert Shellbach (son); Norbert Shellbach (son); Gilbert Shellbach (son); Missy Shellbach (daughter)
- Relatives: Crazy Aunt Gretchen (aunt); Colonel Hutchison (father-in-law); Mrs. Hutchison (mother-in-law)
- Nationality: American

Filburt Shellbach (né Turtle) is a character in Nickelodeon's animated series Rocko's Modern Life, the Netflix animated special Rocko's Modern Life: Static Cling and the comic book series of the same name. He is an anthropomorphic turtle who is often pessimistic. In the Australian website of the television show, his name is sometimes spelled as Filbert and sometimes as Filburt. In the comic book, his name is spelled Filbert. On the show's creator Joe Murray's website and in the episodes "Born to Spawn" and "Uniform Behavior", his name is spelled as Filburt. In the episodes "Born to Spawn" and "Fortune Cookie", he is referred to as Mr. Filburt Turtle. However, in the episode "High Five of Doom" Rocko and Heffer read in Filburt's diary that his full name is Filburt Shellbach, which was officially considered his real name. Mr. Lawrence provided Filburt's voice.

Whenever Filburt feels uncomfortable or disturbed, he is known to say, "I'm nauseous! I'm nauseous!". He also occasionally says, "Oh boy" and "Oh fishsticks." He also popularized the phrase "Turn the page, wash your hands," in reference to clammy hands being stained by poor-quality comic book inks.

Filburt becomes age 21 in the episode "Born to Spawn".

== Development ==
Joe Murray, the creator of the show intended for Filburt to be a secondary character used to "add texture" to Rocko and Heffer Wolfe. Mr. Lawrence, functioning as a director on the show sculpted Filburt into a main character befriending Rocko and Heffer.

Joe auditioned Mr. Lawrence in a large casting call in Los Angeles and chose him as the voice actor for Filburt. Joe stated that he did not expect for Mr. Lawrence's "east coast nasal to be perfect for Filburt." [sic]

Writer Martin Olson described the decision when Nickelodeon gave the green light for the marriage of Filburt and Paula Hutchison as one of the most memorable moments of the production. Martin said that the executives at first did not like the idea: linear character development did not exist in Nicktoons. Joe convinced the executives to allow for the marriage to occur.

== Character ==
Filburt, described on the Nickelodeon Australia website as "nerdy" and "neurotic" bears many phobias. Filburt, a former "genius," "babe magnet," and "star athlete," became ruined by a case of "unrequited love." The Nickelodeon South East Asia website states "think of Woody Allen when you think of Filburt."

His birthplace is Kerplopitgoes Island (named after the Galápagos Islands). On his 21st birthday, he is required to go back to the island for a period of time.

Filburt in the 1990s Marvel Rocko's Modern Life comic book series
