= Awesome Possum... Kicks Dr. Machino's Butt =

1993 video game

Awesome Possum
- North American cover art
- Developer: Tengen
- Publisher: Tengen
- Designer: Richard L. Seaborne
- Composers: Earl Vickers; Doug Brandon; Nu Romantic
- Platform: Sega Mega Drive/Genesis
- Release: NA: November 1993; JP: December 25, 1993
- Genre: Platform
- Mode: Single-player

Awesome Possum... Kicks Dr. Machino's Butt is a video game created and published by Tengen for the Sega Mega Drive/Genesis that was released in late 1993. It also had many lines of digitized speech, unusual for its time, a feature with which the game was marketed. The box also states, "it is an excellent educational game for all ages".

== Plot ==
Mad scientist Dr. Machino has sent his robots to pollute the earth and endanger the wildlife. Aided by Killer Bee and Rad Rhino, Awesome Possum sets out to destroy the robots, put a stop to the mad scientist and save the world.

== Gameplay ==
Awesome Possum includes environmental activist elements, with the character collecting empty bottles and cans, and answering questions about the environment to earn bonus points in his fight against the evil Dr. Machino. There are also various other animals located within levels which Awesome can ride to activate their ability, such as Killer Bee, who allows Awesome to fly, or Rad Rhino, who catapults Awesome. There are a total of four worlds which together consist of 13 levels all together, plus 12 bonus stages alongside the quiz in which Awesome must collect as many recyclables as possible before the time expires.

== Development ==
In 1984, during his high school years, Richard Seaborne was assigned to write a story for his debate class. He watched the 1954 film Godzilla, which inspired him to write a story about an animal with "extraordinary abilities". He chose an opossum to use as the protagonist of his story after seeing them roaming his backyard, and named the story "Awesome Possum: International Environmental Investigator". In April 1992, Seaborne was hired by Tengen to do a concept for an environmental game. Several employees at Tengen pitched characters for the game, including "Graphic the Warthog". Seaborne came up with the character "Awesome Possum". By July 17, 1992, he presented his proposal "Rad Rhino and Awesome Possum" to Tengen, and they approved it. Development for the artwork was underway by the fall of 1992, but the initial animations were unsatisfactory. Tengen hired Jules Marino on January 18, 1993, to polish the game character's sprites. Awesome was originally planned to be a North American opossum, but Tengen found the design "too vicious" and changed him into a common ringtail possum. To make the game stand out from other platformers, 80 digitized speech samples were added. Tengen originally approached Robin Williams to provide voices for the game, but Williams' agent said that he was not interested. The game included the voice talents of Walter Fields, Laurie Amat and Douglas Lawrence.

Initially named Awesome Possum Saves the Environment, the final title of the game was made official on May 13, 1993. The development team included a 12-page comic in the manual. Awesome Possum... Kicks Dr. Machino's Butt was produced and released during a trend of platformers starring animal mascots. The absence of Sega's third Sonic the Hedgehog title in the fall and holiday season of 1993 enabled other publishers to fill in space for mascot platformers, such as Tengen with Awesome Possum and Irem with Rocky Rodent.

== Lawsuit ==
When Time Warner Interactive took over Tengen and its parent company Atari Games in 1994, they also got the rights of the video game. On June 20, 1997, Time Warner Interactive was charged with copyright infringement by Paul A. Roginski, who claimed that the game copied his comic book concept and character name for his manuscript. With Roginski lacking evidence to prove his claim, the case was closed and the defendants were acquitted.

== Reception ==
Reception

Review scores
Publication	Score
Beep! MegaDrive	22/40
Electronic Gaming Monthly	31/50
GamePro	16/20
GameZone	76%
Mean Machines Sega	39/100
Video Games (DE)	67%
VideoGames & Computer Entertainment	8/10
Electronic Games	93%
Game Power	89/100
Mega	48%
MegaTech	49/100
Sega Power	51%
Sega Pro	25%

Award
Publication	Award
Electronic Games	Best voice

GamePro praised the sound and speed, though they were somewhat critical of the graphics. Electronic Games, however, gave the game 93% and remarked "There are very few games that can produce this level of headbanging thrills." Brazilian magazine Ação Games gave the game an orange picture (the third level rating) for graphics, challenge, and fun; and a pink picture (the fourth and top level rating) for sound.

In a 2006 feature on Hardcore Gamer, Roger Danish condemned Awesome Possum, saying, "There are bad games. There are terrible games. There are games so heinously appalling and horrendous that you want to gauge your eyes out with a spork after a few minutes of playtime. However, Tengen's Awesome Possum: Kicks Dr. Machino's Butt trumps them all with its crappy gameplay, muddy graphics, screeching music, warbled sound effects, and preachy premise." He was heavily irritated by the "annoying and narcissistic" personality of the title character, particularly his "screechy wisecracks" and his constant reminding of how "awesome" and "cool" he was. His other criticisms included the "horrific" title theme and the poor controls.
