= Let's Go Luna! =

Animated educational television series

- Genre: Children's television series; Comedy; Educational
- Created by: Joe Murray
- Directed by: Dave Brown; Steve Daye; Matt Mitchell
- Voices of: Judy Greer; Saara Chaudry; Jaiden Cannatelli; Aidan Wojtak-Hissong; Shayle Simons; Evan O'Donnell
- Theme music composer: Jeffrey Bernstein
- Opening theme: "Let's Go Luna, Let's Go!"
- Ending theme: "Let's Go Luna, Let's Go!" (instrumental)
- Composers: Amin Bhatia (score); Ari Posner (score); Jeffrey Bernstein (songs)
- Countries of origin: Canada; United States
- Original language: English
- No. of seasons: 2
- No. of episodes: 65 (129 segments)

Production
- Executive producers: Joe Murray; Vince Commisso
- Producer: Charley Thomas
- Running time: 24 minutes 45 minutes ("Luna's Christmas Around the World")
- Production companies: 9 Story Media Group; Brown Bag Films

Original release
- Network: PBS Kids (U.S.); TVOKids (Canada)
- Release: November 21, 2018 – November 18, 2022

Let's Go Luna! is an educational animated children's television series created by Joe Murray that aired on PBS Kids. Murray formerly worked on the Nickelodeon animated series Rocko's Modern Life and Cartoon Network animated series Camp Lazlo. It is co-produced by Pipeline Studios Inc. 9 Story Media Group and Brown Bag Films. Judy Greer provides the voice of the titular Luna. In the first season, there are 38 half-hour episodes and a one-hour special; the second season has 26 episodes. Each episode consists of two 11-minute story segments, with a short segment of one of the characters telling a folktale, song or poem from that country in between.

Unlike Rocko's Modern Life and Camp Lazlo, which are both sitcoms, Let's Go Luna! marks the first educational series created by Joe Murray. The series premiered on November 21, 2018, and aired 65 episodes through November 18, 2022.

== Premise ==
Set in a world populated by anthropomorphic animals, Let's Go Luna! focuses on three kids—Leo, a wombat from Sydney, New South Wales; Andy, a frog from the United States; and Carmen, a butterfly from Mexico City, Mexico—who travel around the world with their parents' traveling performance troupe "Circo Fabuloso". Along their stops, Luna the Moon, depicted about 5 feet (1.5 m) tall with arms, legs, and a face, and wearing a straw hat and red boots, occasionally comes down to Earth to teach them about local languages, music, food, and other customs. Two half-hour episodes, consisting of two segments each and four in total, take place in a single country where the gang stops, learns about, and meets friends around the world.

== Characters ==
=== Main ===
- Luna (speaking voice by Judy Greer; singing voices by Erin Fitzgerald and Liane de Lotbinere) is Earth's Moon herself, who guides Leo, Andy, and Carmen on their trips during the daytime. She knows every person in the world and has magical capabilities. Her size gives her a problem with doorways and enclosed spaces, often involving a degree of uncomfortable squeezing to enter. She also has an uncontrollable urge to dance when she hears happy music.
- Leo Chockers (voiced by Aidan Wojtak-Hissong in "Hola Mariachi!" – "A Chopsticky Situation" and Shayle Simons in "Speaking Wigglewalker" – "Love and Harmony") is a wombat from Sydney, New South Wales who loves food.
- Andy Hopper (voiced by Jaiden Cannatelli in "Hola Mariachi!" – "The Charango Kid" and Evan O'Donnell in "Cusco, Weave Got a Problem" – "Love and Harmony") is a frog who loves art and sports.
- Carmen Mariposa (voiced by Saara Chaudry) is a butterfly from Mexico City who loves music.
- Magic Globe (voiced by Miku Graham) is a miniature globe of the world that lives in Carmen's pocket and can share information about the places that the children visit.

=== Recurring ===
- Señor Moncarlo Fabuloso (voiced by Paul Braunstein) is a flamingo and the ringmaster of the Circo Fabuloso. He speaks with a Spanish accent.
- Mr. Hock "Hockbar" Thelonious Bar (voiced by David Berni) is a vole who does many of the behind-the-scenes jobs such as selling tickets, setting up the Circo's schedule and making certain everything runs smoothly. He is full of energy and has a tendency to get worked up and rush around when many things need doing, which can stress out the other members of the Circo.
- Honey (voiced by Zoe Hatz) is Carmen's mischievous yellow pet hamster. She often escapes from her cage, but it is only because she is curious and wishes to be included.
- Maria Mariposa (voiced by Tamara Almeida) is Carmen's single mother, and the music conductress of the Circo Fabuloso Band.
- Wolfgang (voiced by Paul Braunstein) and Pippa Chockers (voiced by Linda Ballantyne) are Leo's parents who work at the Circo. Wolfgang is the Circo's chef (who loves Dad jokes) and Pippa is the Circo's carpenter.
- Mathilda Chockers is Leo's baby sister who can be destructive, but Leo finds in "Glocken Around the Clock" it takes a special kind of glockenspiel to make her happy.
- Wrinkles is Leo's pet tortoise.
- Lucie Hopper (voiced by Carolyn Scott) is Andy's mother, and the Circo's costume designer. She speaks with a Midwestern accent.
- Sam Hopper (voiced by Dan Chameroy) is Andy's father and Circo's prop-maker.
- Bonjour and Au Revoir (both voiced by Peter Cugno) are twin brothers who work as clowns. Bonjour's mask is purple and Au Revoir's is green. They both speak with French accents.
- Ingrid Svenson-Benson (voiced by Brigitte Solem) is a centipede and the Circo's contortionist. She speaks with a Swedish accent.
- Salami Strong (voiced by Paul Braunstein) is an alligator and the Circo's strongman. He speaks with an Italian accent.
- Pablo (voiced by Cory Doran) is an armadillo who performs with the Melvinis, a group of six living bowling pins.
- The Acronauts are a trio of acorn-shaped bears who perform as acrobats.
- The Fearless Shrews (all three voiced by David Berni) are a trio of shrews who perform as trapeze artists. They speak with Peruvian accents.
- Wally is a gray walrus wearing brown pants, a red shirt, and a battered brown hat, with a camera around his neck. The character often appears as a tourist, as he makes an appearance as a background character in every story, usually taking photographs and infrequently having a speaking role.

== Episodes ==
Season	Segments	Episodes	Originally released	
Season	Segments	Episodes	First released	Last released
1	77	39	November 21, 2018	August 13, 2020
2	52	26	May 10, 2021	November 18, 2022

=== Season 1 (2018–20) ===
No. overall	No. in season	Title	Written by	Storyboard and Additional Writing by	Location	Original Air Date
1	1	"Hola Mariachi!" "Loco for Cocoa"	Joe Murray & Luccy Baillie Joe Murray & Mark Haslett	Jackie Bae & Tom Smith Dan Becker & Eric David Haddad	Mexico City, Mexico	November 21, 2018; May 4, 2019 (Canada) November 22, 2018; May 4, 2019 (Canada)
Carmen tries to find a Mariachi band to fill in for the Circo's band when they get the hiccups. The trio help Carmen's friend Pico deliver a lost cocoa bean that was accidentally left behind by his mother.
2	2	"What's the Big Idea?" "The Day of the Dead"	Peter Hannan & Eric David Haddad Peter Hannan	Dan Becker Jackie Bae & Tom Smith	Mexico City, Mexico	November 21, 2018; May 5, 2019 (Canada)
In Mexico City, Andy learns about murals when trying to find something to paint on. Carmen must face her fear of skeletons in order to make it to her Grandmother's Day of the Dead altar.
3	3	"You Froze My Shorts" "What a Matryoshka"	Mark Haslett Peter Hannan	Dan Becker & Eric David Haddad Tom Smith & Jackie Bae	Moscow, Russia	November 21, 2018 November 27, 2018
Luna shows the kids different ways to stay warm during a Russian winter. A delivery mix-up tasks the kids with returning a giant matryoshka doll to the store.
4	4	"Lullaby for Baby Vlad" "Space Is the Place"	Rachel Lipman Joe Murray	Dan Becker & Eric David Haddad Tom Smith & Jackie Bae	Moscow, Russia	November 22, 2018; May 11, 2019 (Canada)
Leo and Andy watch over a cranky baby bear named Vlad while Luna and Carmen search for a lullaby called "Bayushki Bayu" to help him go to sleep. Andy's love for space is fulfilled by a trip to a Russian space museum.
5	5	"Bob the Plant" "Aren't We a Pair?"	Joe Murray Mark Haslett	Dan Becker & Eric David Haddad Tom Smith & Jackie Bae	Cairo, Egypt	November 21, 2018 November 28, 2018
Leo's plant Bob is all dried out from the hot Egyptian weather and needs water. Carmen makes a new friend named Leyla in Cairo while looking for her missing pet Honey.
6	6	"The Big Dig" "Amazing Man"	Rachel Lipman Peter Hannan	Dan Becker & Eric David Haddad Tom Smith & Jackie Bae	Cairo, Egypt	November 29, 2018 December 5, 2018
In Cairo, the kids become interested in digging for ancient artifacts. A riddle in Andy's Amazing Man comic book uses hieroglyphics so he and the Amazing Team seek to find out what they mean.
7	7	"She Is the Moon of Moons" "Beats of Beijing"	Joe Murray Rachel Lipman	Tom Smith & Jackie Bae Dan Becker & Eric David Haddad	Beijing, China	November 21, 2018 December 3, 2018
The kids plan a special day for Luna, coincidentally on the same day as the traditional Moon Festival in China. Honey is feeling bored of her old cage and wants her new one to be a Chinese drum.
8	8	"Hoopin' Hopper" "A Chopsticky Situation"	Mark Haslett Peter Hannan	Dan Becker & Eric David Haddad Tom Smith & Jackie Bae	Beijing, China	December 4, 2018
Andy loses his basketball in Beijing, and through playing more sports to retrieve it, he learns that friendship is much more important than winning. Leo has a difficult time learning to eat with chopsticks at a Chinese restaurant.
9	9	"Luna's Christmas Around the World"	Peter Hannan, Joe Murray, Rachel Lipman, & Mark Haslett	Dan Becker, Eric David Haddad, Jackie Bae, Tom Smith, & Joe Murray	Antarctica	December 10, 2018
While travelling to Australia to spend Christmas there, the ship transporting the Circo gets stuck in Antarctica, thanks to Captain Shaggybottom eating too much ham. With the help of Luna, the gang learn about how different countries celebrate the holidays.
10	10	"Speaking Wigglewalker" "London Frog"	Peter Hannan Mark Haslett	Dan Becker & Eric David Haddad Tom Smith & Jackie Bae	London, England	November 21, 2018 December 11, 2018
Andy is confused during a trip to a London supermarket due to the differences between British English and American English. Luna helps the kids navigate the London fog to find Big Ben.
11	11	"Queen for a Day" "Jolly Special Friend"	Rachel Lipman Joe Murray	Dan Becker & Eric David Haddad Tom Smith & Jackie Bae	London, England	December 13, 2018
Carmen pretends to be the Queen of Buckingham Palace, but later finds it less fun than she imagined. Papa Chockers is too sick to make lunch for Señor Fabuloso's friend so Leo and his friends go out to get some traditional London food for them.
12	12	"Guitar to Sitar" "Spring Has Not Sprung"	Mark Haslett Peter Hannan	Dan Becker & Eric David Haddad Jackie Bae & Tom Smith	Delhi, India	March 4, 2019
The strings on Carmen's guitar snap while she is writing a song for her mother's birthday and she needs to buy more from a bazaar. Andy wants to photograph the Springtime colors of Delhi but then an overcast weather turns everything gray.
13	13	"Where's Luna?" "Pulling Strings"	Joe Murray Rachel Lipman	Jackie Bae & Dan Becker Eric David Haddad & Tom Smith	Delhi, India	March 5, 2019
Luna appears to have gone missing so the Trio, along with Señor Fabuloso, try and find her. Andy and Carmen get into a heated argument and stop talking to each other, so Luna and Leo try to use a traditional Kathputli puppet show to help them make up.
14	14	"Didgeridoo and Carmen Too" "Not Home on the Range"	Rachel Lipman Peter Hannan	Dan Becker & Eric David Haddad Tom Smith & Jackie Bae	Sydney, New South Wales	March 6, 2019
Carmen borrows a didgeridoo from a new friend in Sydney but ends up losing it, so she tries to make a new one. A visit to his uncle's cattle station forces Leo to confront his fear of horses.
15	15	"Boomin' Boomerang" "House Music"	Joe Murray Mark Haslett	Dan Becker & Eric David Haddad Tom Smith & Jackie Bae	Sydney, New South Wales	March 7, 2019
Carmen is asked to compete in a boomerang throwing competition but she lacks confidence. Andy is excited to hear the band Syd and the Sydneys perform at the Sydney Opera House.
16	16	"You Can't Move the Moon" "Lizardzilla!"	Mark Haslett Peter Hannan	Dan Becker & Eric David Haddad Tom Smith & Jackie Bae	Tokyo, Japan	May 27, 2019
A Sumo wrestler puts on an exhibition match with Luna after Salami Strong gets injured. Leo is too afraid to watch a Lizardzilla movie, but becomes less afraid when he sees how the movies are made.
17	17	"Windy Washi" "When the Bowl Breaks"	Joe Murray Rachel Lipman	Dan Becker & Eric David Haddad Tom Smith & Jackie Bae	Tokyo, Japan	May 28, 2019
Andy is asked to make posters for the Circo, which leads to learning about the many uses of washi paper. Leo learns how to repair broken pottery after he accidentally breaks his dad's special tea bowl.
18	18	"C'est Cheese" "C'est la Vie a Paris"	Rachel Lipman Mark Haslett	Dan Becker & Eric David Haddad Tom Smith & Jackie Bae	Paris, France	August 12, 2019
Leo needs to make his best dish for his French cooking class but can't think of the perfect thing to make. Mr. Hockbar is overworking himself and everyone else at the Circo, so the kids and Luna try to find something in Paris to help him relax.
19	19	"D'Orsay Day" "Honey in Paris"	Joe Murray Peter Hannan	Dan Becker & Eric David Haddad Tom Smith & Jackie Bae	Paris, France	August 13, 2019
Andy is trying to make a perfect painting of his model train, but can't make it look 'alive' enough, so Luna takes him to Musée d'Orsay to show him other ways to paint. Honey escapes from her cage again and returns head over heels in love with someone named "Mon Amour". Carmen and her friends are determined to find out who exactly this mysterious stranger is.
20	20	"Totally Totem" "Glacier or Bust"	Mark Haslett Rachel Lipman	Dan Becker & Eric David Haddad Tom Smith & Jackie Bae	Juneau, Alaska	October 31, 2019 (Knowledge Network); May 18, 2020 (USA)
In Juneau, Andy and Luna want to tell their story in a totem pole and write their list with a totem pole artist. Andy wants to see the beautiful blue lights of Mendenhall Glacier ice caves, but the trip gets harder than expected.
21	21	"Nature Calls" "Story Story"	Joe Murray Peter Hannan	Eric David & Dan Becker Jackie Bae & Tom Smith	Juneau, Alaska	August 25, 2019; November 1, 2019 (Knowledge Network); February 4, 2020 (U.S.)
Leo worries about all the wild animals living in Juneau until he learns they need their own space with wildlife. While waiting for the newest book in her favorite series, Carmen learns the values of spoken stories from older times.
22	22	"A Prickly Pair" "Turkish Delight"	Peter Hannan Mark Haslett	Dan Becker & Eric David Haddad Tom Smith & Keith Silva	Istanbul, Turkey	July 22, 2019
In Istanbul, Carmen is excited to see the juggling act "The Prickly Brothers" perform, but the two are feuding. After a firefighter rescues his pet tortoise from a tree, Leo wants to thank him by making him some Turkish delight, but his unwillingness to pay attention causes trouble.
23	23	"The Story of Smoothie" "Andy the Giant"	Joe Murray Rachel Lipman	Dan Becker & Eric David Haddad Tom Smith & Keith Silva	Istanbul, Turkey	July 23, 2019
Leo wants to prove to Andy & Carmen that his tortoise, Wrinkles, has family history in Istanbul's Topkapi Palace. In order for Andy to capture the full beauty of the Hagia Sophia in his drawings, he must learn to look at it in different ways.
24	24	"Lost and Found" "Time of Goodbye"	Joe Murray Rachel Lipman	Dan Becker & Eric David Haddad Tom Smith & Jackie Bae	Barcelona, Spain	September 24, 2019; February 5, 2020 (U.S.)
Señor Fabuloso has lost his creativity; Luna, Carmen, Leo, and Andy travel across Barcelona to see if they can reignite his playful spirit with the help of Antoni Gaudí's unique architecture. It's Saint George's Day in Barcelona, but Señor Fabuloso is furious because the day reminds him of losing track of his friend, which makes Carmen uneasy about giving her newest friend Silvia a gift for the same reason.
25	25	"Castells in the Air" "Barcelona Birdy"	Peter Hannan Mark Haslett	Dan Becker & Eric David Haddad Tom Smith & Keith Silva	Barcelona, Spain	September 25, 2019; May 19, 2020 (U.S.)
Carmen needs to help her new friend Ramona win the Castell contest in Barcelona, but Carmen's independent nature makes this harder than she thought. Leo helps a small bird named Eva get back to her nest, but the nest is located at the top of Montserrat. Can he be brave enough to do it?
26	26	"Stairway to Art Day" "Melvini Madness"	Peter Hannan Rachel Lipman	Dan Becker & Eric David Haddad Tom Smith & Keith Silva	Rio de Janeiro, Brazil	September 26, 2019; November 4, 2019 (U.S.); January 18, 2020 (Canada)
Andy's Art Day Extravaganza is put on hold when his father needs him to go into the city to get a nail to fix the steps outside their trailer, which irritates him. Carmen accidentally wakes Pablo the Armadillo's Melvinis after he has left on vacation, and she needs to find a way to get them back to sleep again.
27	27	"Andy's Big Show" "Leo Moves It"	Mark Haslett Joe Murray	Tom Smith & Eric David Haddad Tom Smith & Keith Silva	Rio de Janeiro, Brazil	September 27, 2019; November 5, 2019 (U.S.); January 19, 2020 (Canada)
Andy has made giant statues of some of the Circo members and needs to figure out something to do with them. It's Carnaval at last and Leo wakes up with his hips shimmying uncontrollably to the Samba music. Can he do anything to cure his Samba-itis?
28	28	"The Big Squeeze" "Meet the Presses"	Peter Hannan Mark Haslett	Dan Becker, Eric David Haddad, & Ben Fosselman Tom Smith & Keith Silva	Munich, Germany	November 6, 2019 (U.S.); January 26, 2020 (Canada)
After Freida the Barrel-Rider's accordion-player bows out, Carmen is asked to take her place. Unfortunately, Carmen has never played one before. Señor Fabuloso is so impressed about a book Andy wrote about his Circo that he asks him to make six copies for his friends, needing them in just a couple of hours.
29	29	"Glocken Around the Clock" "Good Knight"	Joe Murray Rachel Lipman	Dan Becker & Ben Fosselman Tom Smith & Keith Silva	Munich, Germany	November 7, 2019 (U.S.); February 1, 2020 (Canada)
Leo's baby sister Mathilda has broken her glockenspiel, and he needs to get her a new one before the "terrible thing" happens when Mathilda gets upset. Carmen wants to become a knight after learning that all the famous ones were male and Honey, deciding to be her "Hamster in Distress", hides inside Neuschwanstein Castle so Carmen can rescue her.
30	30	"Me and My Elephant" "Mukandi's Farm"	Rachel Lipman Mark Haslett	Dan Becker & Ben Fosselman Tom Smith & Keith Silva	Nairobi, Kenya	February 2, 2020 (Canada); February 3, 2020 (U.S.)
When visiting an elephant sanctuary in Nairobi, a surly elephant calf named Maktao immediately bonds with Leo, who is asked to take care of him. Luna invites the three to come with her to help her friend Mukandi with her farm, where they learn both of unique methods of farming as well as Luna's unique methods of harvesting.
31	31	"Beat the Beat" "Rhinoceros or Bust"	Peter Hannan	Dan Becker & Ben Fosselman Tom Smith & Keith Silva	Nairobi, Kenya	February 15, 2020 (Canada); May 20, 2020 (U.S.)
Everyone in the Circo is having a miserable day, so the kids and Luna seek out a Benga band to cheer everyone up. Andy wants to have a photograph of a rhinoceros for his scrapbook, so Luna takes him on a photo safari at Nairobi National Park.
32	32	"The Potato King" "The Charango Kid"	Mark Haslett Peter Hannan	Dan Becker & Ben Fosselman Tom Smith & Keith Silva	Cusco, Peru	February 7, 2020 (U.S.); February 16, 2020 (Canada)
Andy is in the mood for some local Peruvian food, but all there seems to be are potatoes, which he finds to be boring. Carmen is going to play a duet with her friend Sisa at a local music festival, but she accidentally forgets her guitar back at the Circo.
33	33	"Cusco, Weave Got a Problem" "Nice to Meet You, Machu Picchu"	Rachel Lipman Luccy Baillie	Dan Becker & Ben Fosselman Tom Smith & Keith Sliva	Cusco, Peru	February 22, 2020 (Canada); May 21, 2020 (U.S)
Carmen accidentally ruins the pollera dress of Luna's friend Gabriella just before she's about to take part in a parade. Senor Fabuloso hasn't sold a single ticket for the Circo, so when he hears about a hidden city called Machu Picchu, he decides to find it and try selling tickets there.
34	34	"The Mystery of the Mask" "Movie Monday"	Peter Hannan Mark Haslett	Dan Becker & Ben Fosselman Tom Smith & Keith Sliva	Bangkok, Thailand	February 23, 2020 (Canada); August 10, 2020 (U.S.)
Mister Hockbar has gone missing and a stranger wearing a khon mask may be the culprit! Can the kids and Luna as "The Figurin' Stuff Out Crew" solve the mystery? After the power goes out on Movie Monday, Luna takes Andy, Carmen and Leo to see a Nang talung show.
35	35	"Stinky Fruit" "Kick It Good"	Peter Hannan Mark Haslett	Dan Becker & Ben Fosselman Tom Smith & Keith Sliva	Bangkok, Thailand	February 29, 2020 (Canada); June 5, 2020 (Knowledge Kids); August 11, 2020 (U.S.)
Wolfgang brings Leo a durian to taste, but it smells so terrible that he can't bring himself to try. After the kids are invited to play a game of sepak takraw, Andy learns that he's not quite the sports expert he believes.
36	36	"Blue Orleans" "Bonjour, Au Revoir, Adios"	Peter Hannan & Luccy Baillie Peter Hannan	Dan Becker & Ben Fosselman Tom Smith & Keith Sliva	New Orleans, Louisiana	March 21, 2020 (Canada); May 22, 2020 (U.S.)
Luna is feeling upset after the death of Bessie, one of her oldest friends, so the kids try to cheer her up by having her attend Bessie's jazz funeral. Señor Fabuloso argues with Bonjour and Au Revoir about whether New Orleans takes more influence from Spain or France.
37	37	"More Than All That Jazz" "Swamp Pals"	Peter Hannan Luccy Baillie	Dan Becker & Ben Fosselman Keith Silva & Kathy Jo Larson	New Orleans, Louisiana	February 6, 2020 (U.S.); March 22, 2020 (Canada)
Carmen puts together a jazz band with Leo and Andy to take the place of the Circo's band, but they aren't very good until they're taught about jazz improvisation. Leo is nervous to meet his pen pal Remy in the Louisiana bayou because of how amazing he made it sound in his letters.
38	38	"Viva La Pasta" "Arrievederci Aqua!"	Peter Hannan Joe Murray	Dan Becker & Ben Fosselman Keith Sliva & Kathy Jo Larson	Rome, Italy	March 28, 2020 (Canada); August 12, 2020 (U.S.)
Carmen forgets Honey's birthday, and wants to make the finest pasta in Rome, but when she finds out that it comes to pasta, something simpler sounds better. After the Circo mysteriously runs out of water in Rome, Andy vows to build an aqueduct to bring water back just like the ancient Romans.
39	39	"Monster Park" "Meet the Strongs"	Peter Hannan Luccy Baillie	Dan Becker & Ben Fosselman	Rome, Italy	March 29, 2020 (Canada); August 13, 2020 (U.S.)
When Wrinkles the tortoise gets lost outside Rome in spooky Monster Park, Leo must face his fears to find him! Leo thinks that having a baby sister is a pain, but after going to Salami Strong's house in Rome for a special family meal, he comes to see his role of a big brother a little differently.

=== Season 2 (2021–22) ===
No. overall	No. in season	Title	Written by	Storyboard and Additional Writing by	Location	Original Air Date
40	1	"Leo the Viking" "Big Little Trouble"	Peter Hannan	Dan Becker & Ben Fosselman Keith Sliva & Kathy Jo Larson	Reykjavík, Iceland	May 10, 2021
Leo wants to live the life of a viking. An acrobat refuses to perform for Circo Fabuloso because he believes the tent is infested with Huldufólk.
41	2	"Volcano Boy" "A Sea Monster Tale"	Luccy Baille Joe Murray	Keith Silva & Kathy Jo Larson Dan Becker & Ben Fosselman	Reykjavík, Iceland	May 11, 2021
Leo becomes irritable when everyone ignores his plan to spend time at the hot springs to go look at volcanoes and geysers. Andy worries about sea monster attacks after visiting a museum in Reykjavík.
42	3	"Gaja's Birthday" "Kabaddi Kid"	Mark Haslett Peter Hannan	Keith Silva & Kathy Jo Larson Dan Becker & Ben Fosselman	Delhi, India	May 12, 2021
Señor Fabuloso is afraid of taking the kids to their friend Gaja's birthday party. Andy learns about the sport kabaddi, but he's not as good at it as he thinks.
43	4	"Give Me a Sign" "Hip Life"	Mark Haslett Peter Hannan	Keith Sliva & Kathy Jo Larson Dan Becker, Ben Fosselman, & Davey Jarrell	Kumasi, Ghana	May 13, 2021
Andy is asked to make a sign for a barber shop owner, but when he hurts his hand he convinces the owner's son to bring out his artistic self. Carmen thinks she knows everything about Kumasi, but her beliefs are challenged when a hiplife rapper asks for her help on a song.
44	5	"Muddy Miracle" "Fabuloso's New Clothes"	Rachel Lipman Luccy Baille	Keith Silva, Kathy Jo Larson, & Davey Jarrell Ben Fosselman & Kathy Jo Larson	Kumasi, Ghana	May 14, 2021
Leo discovers how to make buildings out of mud after accidentally ruining the circus tent. Andy mistakenly destroys Señor Fabuloso's suit so he tries to make a new one out of Kente cloth.
45	6	"Blanket Decision" "Yo, Yo, Heave....Whoa!"	Mark Haslett Peter Hannan	Keith Silva & Kathy Jo Larson Dan Becker & Ben Fosselman	Boston, Massachusetts	June 7, 2021 (Canada); July 1, 2021 (U.S.)
With the help of the American tradition of quilting, Andy figures out a way to keep his worn-out childhood blanket. To inspire the others in fixing the disconcerted circus, Carmen sings a sea shanty she wrote.
46	7	"Old School" "Yankee Doodle Andy"	Peter Hannan Luccy Baillie	Keith Silva & Kathy Jo Larson Dan Becker & Ben Fosselman	Boston, Massachusetts	July 2, 2021
Leo wants to go to school in Massachusetts. Andy must save the Fourth of July fireworks when Señor Fabuloso says there won't be any.
47	8	"Beetlemania" "Robo Kid"	Mark Haslett Luccy Baillie	Keith Silva & Davey Jarrell Ben Fosselman & Kathy Jo Larson	Tokyo, Japan	August 21, 2021 (Canada); November 15, 2021 (U.S.)
Andy helps a lost beetle find its owner in the huge city of Tokyo, Japan. Andy heads into the hi-tech city of Tokyo in hopes of obtaining super-robot powers.
48	9	"It Takes Leo to Tango" "Siesta is Besta"	Mark Haslett Peter Hannan & Mark Haslett	Keith Silva & Davey Jarrell Ben Fosselman & Kathy Jo Larson	Buenos Aires, Argentina	August 28, 2021 (Canada); January 24, 2022 (U.S)
Leo fills in for a Tango dancer's partner but has no clue what he's doing; Luna must give him dance lessons without getting the crazy legs. Carmen worries so much about a mix-up in her uncle's Circo act that she doesn't have time to rest.
49	10	"What a T-Wreck!" "Way of the Gaucho"	Luccy Baillie Peter Hannan	Keith Silva & Davey Jarrell Ben Fosselman & Kathy Jo Larson	Buenos Aires, Argentina	September 4, 2021 (Canada); November 16, 2021 (U.S.)
Andy finds a Giganotosaurus fossil tooth in Argentina, but he's hesitant to donate it to a museum. Carmen wants to live like a gaucho, but does she have what it takes?
50	11	"The Amazing Aito" "The Haka"	Peter Hannan Luccy Baillie	Keith Silva & Davey Jarrell Ben Fosselman & Kathy Jo Larson	Polynesia	September 11, 2021 (Canada); January 25, 2022 (U.S)
In Tahiti, Andy goes looking for a legendary, reclusive Tahitian juggler to perform at the Circo. In Rotorua, Leo leads a haka to welcome a Māori chief to the Circo.
51	12	"A Tough Nut to Crack" "It's a Beautiful, Wonderful Life"	Joe Ansolabehere Peter Hannan	Keith Silva & Davey Jarrell Ben Fosselman & Kathy Jo Larson	Polynesia	September 18, 2021 (Canada); November 17, 2021 (U.S.)
Leo can't figure out how to crack open his first coconut. A dance called the Maulu'ulu helps Carmen and Honey learn to appreciate everyday life.
52	13	"Save That Piñata" "Forever Folklorico"	Rachel Lipman Luccy Baillie	Keith Silva & Davey Jarrell Kathy Jo Larson & Michelle Rincon	Mexico City, Mexico	September 25, 2021 (Canada); January 26, 2022 (U.S)
Andy doesn't want anyone to smash up the piñata he made. Carmen must attend a Baile Folklorico dance lesson before she can go to a concert from her favorite band.
53	14	"The Ghost Piper of Edinburgh Castle" "Make 'Em Laugh"	Peter Hannan	Keith Silva & Davey Jarrell Kathy Jo Larson & Michelle Rincon	Edinburgh, Scotland	October 2, 2021 (Canada); January 27, 2022 (U.S)
Carmen hears the haunting sound of bagpipes coming from Edinburgh Castle and goes to find out who's playing them. Wolfgang wants to perform his terrible dad jokes at Edinburgh's Fringe Festival, and Leo tries to stop him to keep his dad from being embarrassed.
54	15	"Andy, King of Scots" "Leo the Nessie Hunter"	Joe Murray & Peter Hannan Joe Murray	Keith Silva & Davey Jarrell Kathy Jo Larson & Michelle Rincon	Edinburgh, Scotland	October 9, 2021 (Canada); November 18, 2021 (U.S.)
Andy becomes obsessed with everything Scottish after learning about his Scottish heritage. Leo sets out to prove that the Loch Ness Monster is real.
55	16	"Dragon Dance" "Son of the Dragon King"	Peter Hannan	Keith Silva & Davey Jarrell Kathy Jo Larson & Michelle Rincon	Beijing, China	October 16, 2021 (Canada); February 1, 2022 (U.S.)
Andy believes the longer the dragon, the better the luck when it comes to the Chinese dragon dance. Leo inspires Wrinkles with the story of Bixi.
56	17	"Totally Yodelly" "Barry and the Lost Smell"	Peter Hannan	Keith Silva & Davey Jarrell Kathy Jo Larson & Michelle Rincon	Geneva, Switzerland	October 23, 2021 (Canada); November 19, 2021 (U.S.)
Leo discovers that he yodels in his sleep, so Señor Fabuloso asks him to call a group of performing goats to the Circo. Andy convinces an old St. Bernard named Barry to come out of retirement and help Señor Fabuloso when he gets trapped in an avalanche.
57	18	"Mr. Precise" "The Case of the Missing Cheese"	Peter Hannan	Keith Silva & Davey Jarrell Kathy Jo Larson & Michelle Rincon	Geneva, Switzerland	October 30, 2021 (Canada); May 23, 2022 (U.S.)
Carmen breaks her favorite clock. Leo learns about Swiss cheese.
58	19	"A Moon's Trip to Paris" "If a Hamster Could Fly"	Peter Hannan Joe Ansolabehere	Keith Silva & Davey Jarrell Kathy Jo Larson & Michelle Rincon	Paris, France	November 6, 2021 (Canada); May 24, 2022 (U.S.)
Andy learns about movie magic in Paris. Carmen chases a hot air balloon.
59	20	"Cave Dad" "Grumpa Comes to Call"	Luccy Baillie	Keith Silva & Davey Jarrell Kathy Jo Larson & Michelle Rincon	Dubrovnik, Croatia	November 13, 2021 (Canada); May 25, 2022 (U.S.)
Andy thinks his Dad is a caveman in Dubrovnik, Croatia. Carmen cheers up her grandpa.
60	21	"Lights Out!" "The Wrong Clothes"	Joe Ansolabehere Mark Haslett & Peter Hannan	Keith Silva, Davey Jarrell, & Andrew Murray Kathy Jo Larson & Michelle Rincon	Dubrovnik, Croatia	November 27, 2021 (Canada); May 26, 2022 (U.S.)
In Dubrovnik, Croatia, Leo, the kids, and Luna use a Tesla coil to power Fabuloso's broken reading-light hat! Andy accidentally joins a dance troupe.
61	22	"Elementary, My Dear Watsons" "Way Down in London Town"	Peter Hannan Joe Ansolabehere	Davey Jarrell & Andrew Murray Kathy Jo Larson & Michelle Rincon	London, England	November 20, 2021 (Canada); November 14, 2022 (U.S.)
Carmen solves a mystery in London. Andy finds buried history under the city of London.
62	23	"A Duppy Story" "Everything's Irie"	Peter Hannan & Joe Ansolabehere Peter Hannan	Davey Jarrell & Andrew Murray Kathy Jo Larson & Michelle Rincon	Kingston, Jamaica	March 12, 2022 (Canada); November 16, 2022 (U.S.)
Leo listens to a ghost story in Kingston, Jamaica. Señor Fabuloso tries to take a break.
63	24	"Fast Food" "Longbeak the Pirate"	Peter Hannan Mark Haslett & Peter Hannan	Davey Jarrell & Andrew Murray Kathy Jo Larson & Michelle Rincon	Kingston, Jamaica	March 5, 2022 (Canada); November 15, 2022 (U.S.)
Leo competes in a pushcart race in Port Royal, Jamaica. Andy plays pirate for a day.
64	25	"Dig It Daddy-O" "Hilly Nilly"	Peter Hannan Joe Murray	Davey Jarrell & Andrew Murray Kathy Jo Larson & Michelle Rincon	San Francisco, California	March 19, 2022 (Canada); November 17, 2022 (U.S.)
Andy becomes Prince of the Beatniks in San Francisco. The gang rides a cable car.
65	26	"Shaky, Rattle and Roll!" "Love and Harmony"	Joe Murray Peter Hannan	Davey Jarrell & Andrew Murray Kathy Jo Larson & Michelle Rincon	San Francisco, California	March 26, 2022 (Canada); November 18, 2022 (U.S.)
Leo experiences an earthquake in San Francisco. Carmen searches for Love and Harmony.

== Production and distribution ==
The show was first announced on July 31, 2017, as part of the PBS TCA presentation. PBS broadcasts the show on its stations and also airs on the 24-hour PBS Kids channel, as well as the PBS Kids video app. Let's Go Luna! offers digital content for kids, parents and teachers, debuting from its PBS Kids website and a Luna app was also confirmed and would have been released shortly after the series' debut. However, the app ceased development and is on the PBS Kids video and games apps. There was also an Elinor Wonders Why app, but the series was placed on the PBS Kids video and games apps as well. 9 Story International Distribution owns managing and merchandising rights to the show outside Canada. It is also one of a few shows for preschoolers and PBS' first storyboard-driven show where storyboard artists work with the writers, in order to create "visually-driven narratives that highlight each city's distinctive landscape and features". With a team of cultural anthropologists on board, Let's Go Luna! is "meticulously researched to ensure cities and regions are authentically and respectfully portrayed". It was originally going to be titled Luna Around the World but was changed to Let's Go Luna!.

== International broadcast ==
The show aired on Nat Geo Kids in Latin America and streams on Max in the same region. In Spain, the show airs on Canal Panda. In Italy, it airs on Rai Yoyo. In Turkey, the show will air on TRT Çocuk. In the half-hour broadcast of Let's Go Luna! on TVOKids, the short segment that occurs between the two 11-minute story segments of the show is kept in the broadcast instead of being removed.

== Home video ==
Five episodes were released on DVD on February 11, 2020. Episodes were also released on PBS Kids compilation DVDs from 2020-2025.

== Reception ==
=== Critical response ===
The Washington Post wrote that the program is "Teaching tolerance, kindness and friendship."

=== Awards and nominations ===
Year	Award	Category	Nominee	Result	Ref.
2020	Annie Awards	Best Animated Television/Broadcast Production for Preschool Children	Let's Go Luna!	Nominated	
2020	Daytime Emmy Awards	Outstanding Sound Mixing for a Preschool Animated Program	Michael Mancuso	Nominated	
2020	Daytime Emmy Awards	Outstanding Sound Editing for a Preschool Animated Program	Michael Mancuso, Joe Tetreau, Ryan Eligh, Dante Winkler, Matthew McKenzie	Nominated	

== Merchandise ==
On May 18, 2022, Mighty Mojo released plush toys of the main characters throughout its show.
