= Rocko's Modern Life: Static Cling =

2019 American animated comedy television special

- Promotional release poster
- Created by: Joe Murray
- Based on: Rocko's Modern Life by Joe Murray
- Written by: Mr. Lawrence; Joe Murray; Martin Olson
- Directed by: Joe Murray; Cosmo Segurson
- Starring: Carlos Alazraqui; Tom Kenny; Charlie Adler; Mr. Lawrence; Jill Talley; Joe Murray
- Composer: Pat Irwin
- Country of origin: United States
- Original language: English

Production
- Executive producer: Joe Murray
- Producer: Lizbeth Velasco
- Editor: Kevin Sukho Lee
- Running time: 46 minutes
- Production companies: Nickelodeon Animation Studio; Joe Murray Productions

Original release
- Network: Netflix
- Release: August 9, 2019

Rocko's Modern Life: Static Cling (titled onscreen as Rocko's Modern Life: Static Cling: The Rocko Special) is a 2019 American animated comedy streaming television special based on, as well as a continuation of Joe Murray's Nickelodeon series Rocko's Modern Life. This reunion product has Carlos Alazraqui, Tom Kenny, Charlie Adler, Mr. Lawrence, Jill Talley, and Joe Murray reprising their roles from the TV series. It was originally slated to premiere on Nickelodeon in 2018 as a television special, but went unaired. In May 2019, Nickelodeon sold the distribution rights of the special to Netflix, which released the film on August 9, 2019.

After being stuck in space for 20 years, Rocko and his friends return to a late-2010s era O-Town with modern amenities such as constantly updating touchscreen phones, radioactive energy drinks, food trucks and coffee shops on every corner. Rocko, who does not share Heffer and Filburt's enthusiasm for the 21st century, attempts to get his favorite television show The Fatheads back on the air, since it is the last remnant of his past; to do so, he goes on a quest to find the show's creator.

== Plot ==
After Rocko's house was launched into space, Rocko, Heffer, Filburt and Spunky have been adrift for 20 years doing nothing but watching old videos of The Fatheads episodes. Passing by Earth, Filburt realizes that the remote controlling the rocket has been stuck to Heffer's butt all along. They use the re-entry button and land back in O-Town, which they find has changed dramatically in the last 20 years. Heffer and Filburt quickly accept all the new customs and technology, but Rocko is overwhelmed and secludes himself in his house. Bev Bighead comes to welcome Rocko back to Earth; when asked by Rocko why he can't find The Fatheads on TV, she explains the show has been off the air for many years, much to Rocko's horror.

Meanwhile, Ed Bighead makes a clerical error due to a mishap caused by Rocko's re-entry. As a result, Conglom-O enters bankruptcy, along with all of O-Town. Ed is fired by Mr. Dupette and his house is slated for demolition the next day. At Rocko's suggestion, the two return to Conglom-O and convince Mr. Dupette to bring back The Fatheads, claiming a revival will make enough money to save the company. Dupette accepts and rehires Ed, but then orders the Chameleon Brothers to direct a CGI-animated special. Convinced this new direction will ruin The Fatheads, Rocko decides to find the original creator Ralph Bighead, who left on a journey of self-discovery years ago. Using a couch attached to a drone, he, Heffer and Filburt travel the world searching for Ralph, but their battery runs out and they crash-land in the desert. There, they find Ralph, who has undergone a transition and changed her name to Rachel, running a Fatheads ice cream truck. Rocko begs Rachel to return to O-Town and bring back The Fatheads, and she eventually accepts for her family's sake.

Rachel Bighead revealing her identity as a transgender woman.

Meanwhile, Dupette is displeased with the CGI Fatheads special and hires Rachel to take over when Rocko returns with her. However, Ed doesn't accept Rachel's transition. He gets angry and rejects his new reality, forcing him to leave his job and leaving Conglom-O and all O-Town citizens in jeopardy. Rocko tries to fix the entire ordeal, which Ed shouts "Why don't you go back to the '90s, where you belong?" Rocko departs feeling guilty for further ruining things, mainly Rachel and Ed's relationship.

Bev insists Ed to move on from his transphobia, to which he clarifies his anger being directed around everything changing. After Rachel reflects on fond memories of her parents, and inspired by Rocko's validation of her work and identity, she begins working on a new special. Rocko finds Ed in his now demolished house and the two discuss their shared fear and resistance to change. The Winds of Change shows up to lecture them about how change is the key to happiness. Rocko then receives a phone call from Heffer and Filburt informing him that the Fatheads special is complete and about to premiere at Conglom-O. He drags Ed to the premiere and the two begin to watch, only to discover that Rachel has added a new character to the show: a baby Fathead. Everyone but Rocko loves the new character, leading the special to make billions of dollars, and Ed, seeing the influence of their family life in the special, reconciles with Rachel.

Rocko angrily states his disapproval of the special, believing it to be too different from the original Fatheads, but Ed convinces him that change is a part of life and should be embraced, which Rocko then accepts. The rocket that launched Rocko's house suddenly crashes into the Conglom-O building, launching it and Dupette into space, and the money earned rains down on the crowd, saving the town. Filburt reunites with his wife and family, and Rachel and her parents leave for a new life together in the ice cream van.

== Voice cast ==
- Carlos Alazraqui as Rocko, Spunky, Leon Chameleon, Gordon, Mitch, Bun Master, Squirmy the Ringworm
- Tom Kenny as Heffer Wolfe, Chuck Chameleon, Really Really Big Man, Papa Elf, Newscaster, Captain Compost Heap, Winds of Change, Tom, Tree, Bloaty the Tick
- Charlie Adler as Ed & Bev Bighead, Mr. Dupette, Grandpa Wolfe, Mr. and Mrs. Fathead, Dead Napoleon
- Mr. Lawrence as Filburt, Maitre D', Martian 1, Doug, Hopping Hessian, Doodleberg, Lizard
- Jill Talley as Nosey, Rabbit Mama, Schlam-o-Girl, Teacher, Elephant Lady
- Linda Wallem as Dr. Hutchinson, Crazy Aunt Gretchen, Female Giraffe
- Steve Little as Mineman, Construction Worker, Cowboy, Ox, Worm B
- Joe Murray as Rachel Bighead (née Ralph Bighead)
- Cosmo Segurson as Pillow Salesman, Martian 2, VHS Tape, Injured Worm, TV Announcer 1, Russian Hockey Player
- Tom Smith as Really Really Big Man (Movie), VCR
- Dan Becker as Rabbit Dad

== Production ==
In September 2015, Nickelodeon stated that some of its old properties were being considered for revivals, and that Rocko's Modern Life was one of them.

On August 11, 2016, Nickelodeon announced that they had greenlit a one-hour TV special, with Joe Murray as executive producer. Murray revealed to Motherboard that in the special, Rocko will come back to O-Town after being in space for 20 years, and that it will focus on people's reliance on modern technology. On June 22, 2017, it was announced that the title of the special would be Rocko's Modern Life: Static Cling, and reconfirmed that the entire main cast and recurring cast would be reprising their roles, alongside new voice actors Steve Little and co-director Cosmo Segurson. A release date was originally set to 2018. A special sneak peek was released to coincide with the Rocko panel at San Diego Comic-Con in 2017. The same clip was uploaded to YouTube on July 20, 2017.

In the special, it is revealed that anthropomorphic cane toad formerly referred to as Ralph Bighead is a transgender woman and now goes by the name Rachel. Murray stated that the theme of the special, about accepting changes, made the inclusion of a trans character and having others accept their change felt natural as part of the story. At Nickelodeon's suggestion, Murray's team worked with the Gay & Lesbian Alliance Against Defamation (GLAAD) to help make sure the representation was respectful to transgender individuals while fitting into the comedy of the show.

== Release ==
Production on the special officially wrapped on February 8, 2018.

On September 24, 2018, Murray gave a slight update about the lack of news surrounding the special's release. He did not confirm or deny the rumors of the special releasing on streaming, stating he was "sworn to secrecy".

On May 10, 2019, during a conference call for Viacom's second earnings, Viacom president Robert Bakish announced that Netflix had acquired the distribution rights to Rocko's Modern Life: Static Cling and the streaming service confirmed three days later it would premiere in the summer of 2019.

On July 16, 2019, it was confirmed alongside an exclusive clip by the Rocko's Modern Life official Instagram page and various news sources that the show would premiere on Netflix on August 9, 2019.

== Reception ==
The special had an approval rating of 92% on Rotten Tomatoes based on 24 reviews, with an average score of 7.9/10. The critical consensus reads: "Pleasantly strange and surprisingly thoughtful, Rocko's Modern Life: Static Cling succeeds as both a nostalgic look back and a healthy hop forward." The film's handling the concept of change, transgender identity, and nostalgia had been praised by critics, some claiming it to be progressive and a "huge step" for Nickelodeon. Kevin Johnson of The A.V. Club gave the special an "A−", calling it a "smarter and more powerful, more resonant piece of satire than the show's overall reputation", referring to the amount of explicit humor fans remembered from the series, and especially praising the meta-plotline of reboots. On the other hand, TV Guide's review was decidedly more mixed to negative, stating the special is "funnest and funniest when it doesn't try to keep up, and just lets loose", also saying the writers have "failed to make a case for [the special] as an effective rejoinder to the madness of contemporary times".
