= Rocko =

Fictional character

Rocko Rama
- Rocko’s Modern Life character
- First appearance: Trash-O-Madness (1992)
- Created by: Joe Murray
- Voiced by: Carlos Alazraqui

In-universe information
- Full name: Rocko Rama
- Species: Anthropomorphic Western brush wallaby
- Gender: Male
- Occupation: Cashier at Kind of a Lot o' Comics; Various others
- Family: Unnamed mother Unnamed father Magdalene "Maggie" (older sister); Unnamed younger sister
- Relatives: Unnamed niece Unnamed nephew Gib Hootsen (uncle)
- Nationality: Australian

Rocko Rama is the titular main protagonist of the animated television series Rocko's Modern Life, the Netflix special Rocko's Modern Life: Static Cling, and several comic book series of the same name. Carlos Alazraqui provided the voice of Rocko.

== Conception and development ==
Rocko first appeared in a never-released comic, where he is named "Travis". Joe Murray, creator of Rocko's Modern Life, believed that the personality of a wallaby suited Rocko after observing a zoo wallaby "minding his own business" while elephants and monkeys "screamed for attention". After the event, Murray said that "It kind of clicked. Rocko would be at the center of the hurricane of everything swirling around him. He'd be like the everyman who's affected by the dramatic personalities around him." Murray wanted to get his comic into syndication. Afterwards Murray made substantial changes to Rocko. Murray added that the personality of a wallaby mirrored Rocko's humbleness and his tendency to keep his frustrations to himself instead of publicly complaining about them.

In the original pilot for Rocko's Modern Life, the animators colored Rocko yellow instead of light beige. One month before the first episode was submitted to the animation studio in South Korea, Murray changed the color when a toy company wishing to make Rocko plushes refused to license the character after citing that Rocko looked too similar to a yellow character used in one of the company's existing products. Murray fought the changes with the Nickelodeon executives; in the end the executives insisted on changing the color, so Murray changed the color to beige and disliked the choice. On his website Murray said, "He was always yellow to me." Murray said that the company later backed out of the commitment and did not create the plush series. Murray auditioned Alazraqui in San Francisco and chose him as the voice actor for Rocko. Jeff "Swampy" Marsh, a storyboard writer, describes Alazraqui's voice for Rocko as "not really an accurate Australian accent" [sic]; according to Marsh the team used the voice as Alazraqui used the voice for the pilot.

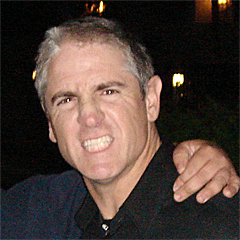
Carlos Alazraqui provides Rocko's voice

Rocko's design changed as his character evolved. Murray said that the version placed in the Rocko's Modern Life proposal was "much looser, and closer to my independent film style. As the series progressed, he adjusted Rocko's design from episode to episode to be more "volume friendly" and "animator friendly". According to Murray, when he created independent films and the Rocko's Modern Life pilot, he created all of the character layouts in his mind and other animators used the layouts to create works. Murray said that when Rocko became "high volume", Murray taught Americans and Koreans how to draw the characters. Murray described Rocko as the most difficult character to draw, and he said that therefore he decided to adjust his character design in order to assist the overseas animators. Murray said that as he and the directors continued to "quickdraw" the character changes to the design "naturally" lessened the "victim, paranoid" aspect and gave the character a "happy personality."

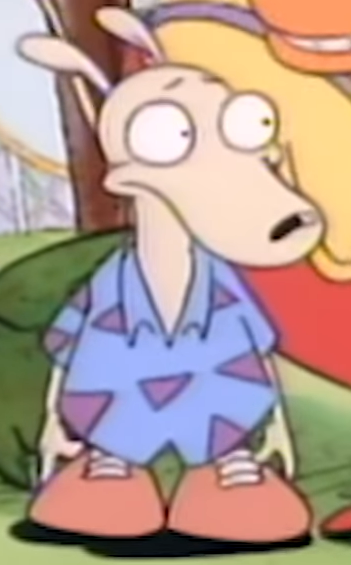
Rocko as seen in Season 1's "Carnival Knowledge". Earlier iterations of Rocko's design were described by Joe Murray as having a "victim, paranoid" appearance.

Rocko as seen in Season 2's "Short Story". Rocko's character design was tweaked over time to be easier to draw, naturally leading to what Murray called a "happy personality".

According to George Maestri, Rocko has no family name because the writers were never able to come up with a family name that they liked. In a concept sketch, Murray named the character "Rocko Rama". The writers considered the family name "Stretchbrain" because the character's brain popped out of his head during "odd moments." The writers scrapped the idea, leaving the character mononymous. Some websites, including Hot Topic, give him the family name "Wallabee" and the middle name "James". In the first two issues of Marvel Comics Rocko's Modern Life series, he's addressed as "Mr. Rocko."

== Character ==
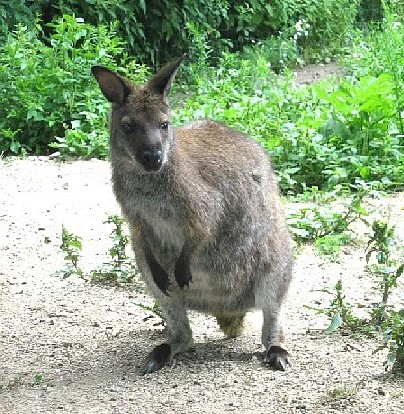
Joe Murray said that as he visited a zoo, he encountered a wallaby that was "minding his own business" while elephants and monkeys "screamed for attention"; according to Murray, this led to the development of Rocko's character

In an early character profile presented to the networks, Murray described Rocko as "a young anthropomorphic Woody Allen, who has just moved away from his home into a surrealistic adult world." Raised in Australia, Rocko later emigrated to the fictional city of O-Town after he graduated high school. Murray suggests that Rocko's interest in the United States began with a vacation with his family as a youth; during the trip he met his friend Filburt. Murray allowed for directors to create inconsistencies, reflecting how friends possess different and varied, nostalgic memories of the past. For instance, in the episode "Put to Pasture" the writers portray Rocko, Filburt and Heffer Wolfe as students at O-Town High School. Murray received many pieces of fan mail regarding the storyline inconsistencies.

In "Trash-O-Madness", a family photograph depicts Rocko with a mother, father, and a younger sibling. "Wimp On the Barby" shows Rocko's family again, revealing that his younger sibling is a sister. Murray created a narcoleptic older sister character named Magdalane "Maggie" in the episode "Wake Up Maggie" about her, but chose to never air the episode and never use the character. Magdalane was created as a mother with 2 children.

Although personally hygienic, Rocko has an almost pathological tendency to neglect his living space; several episodes, such as "Unbalanced Load", involve Rocko attempting to rectify severe messes or lapses in maintenance. Nickelodeon South East Asia's website describes Rocko as "generally very polite and sometimes shy" and that provocation can lead Rocko to become "determined and forceful." Jean Prescott of The Sun Herald described Rocko as a "pudgy little wallaby star" who tries to "do what's right" and is devoted to his friend Heffer and dog Spunky. Prescott has called the character "lovable." Common Sense Media reviewer Andrea Graham, whose review is posted on Go.com, describes Rocko as "paranoid and obsessed with cleanliness" and that he initially perceives his neighbors to be "loud and messy." Graham describes Rocko as accepting of his neighbors' faults and seeing the positive qualities within them.

=== Careers ===
Throughout the television series, Rocko enjoys collecting comics and works as a cashier at a local comic book shop called Kind of a Lot O' Comics, which is owned by Mr. Smitty and sells mostly Really Really Big Man comics until he is currently unemployed in Static Cling. Rocko worked at Mega Lot-o Comics owned by chairman of Conglom-O, Mr. Dupette, Ed Bighead's boss. In the television show, his other jobs include tattoo artist, plumber's assistant, phone operator, a product tester at Conglom-O, a tow truck driver, an underwear model and a cartoonist for the program Wacky Delly. In the official comic book, Rocko works as a comic book dealer in Issue #7's "Conned Again", working for "Humongo Con".

=== Friends and neighbors ===
Rocko's best friends are Heffer Wolfe, a steer who eats a lot and was adopted and raised by a family of wolves, and Filburt, a bespectacled turtle with neurotic Woody Allen-esque mannerisms, who often feels nauseated. Rocko's neighbors are Ed, with whom he has a semi-rivalry, and Bev Bighead. Bev considers Rocko a very sweet neighbor. He and his dog Spunky, who often eats the neighbors' salmon bushes, are a source of constant annoyance to Ed. In the episode Skid Marks, Rocko's drivers license reveals that Rocko and the Bigheads live on "Boogie Blvd."

=== Love life ===
In early concept sketches, Murray indicated that Rocko bears a strong crush on a character named "Melba Toast". Rocko expresses this trait in Season One, bearing a crush on the unseen character until he discovers that Melba has a serious boyfriend named Dave in "Love Spanked". Melba has only been mentioned once since.

In subsequent episodes, Rocko bears crushes for other characters. In "S.W.A.K.", Rocko has been vying for the attention from the pretty kangaroo mail-lady that comes to his door every day; he writes her a love note that he is too scared to send so Heffer does it for him instead. Rocko fails to retrieve the letter and gets the impression that the mail-lady would rather go out with Heffer. This turns out to be a joke on the mail-lady's part and she actually returns Rocko's feelings. In "I See London, I See France", Rocko tries to win over Claudette, who turned out to be his female wallaby pen pal from Paris, but she is more interested in Heffer. In "Wallaby on Wheels", Rocko learns to roller skate to impress Sheila, a pink fox who hangs out at the roller rink, and becomes jealous when it is implied she is attracted to Heffer. In the end, he wins her over after saving Heffer's life. She then rides on a jackhammer with Rocko. Sheila was Rocko's last love interest in the series, though it is never explained on how their relationship turned out to be.

== Video game appearances ==
Rocko is the main playable character of Rocko's Modern Life: Spunky's Dangerous Day and also in the console version of Nicktoons: Attack of the Toybots, an actor in Microsoft's Nickelodeon 3D Movie Maker, and Rocko and Heffer make a cameo appearance on one of the loading screens in Nicktoons MLB. Rocko and Heffer are playable characters in the web browser game Super Brawl Universe, and are both playable racers in Nickelodeon Kart Racers 2: Grand Prix. Rocko also appears as a playable character in Nickelodeon All-Star Brawl, Nickelodeon Kart Racers 3: Slime Speedway, and the Apple Arcade exclusive game Nickelodeon Extreme Tennis.

Rocko, alongside Invader Zim, Danny Phantom, Jenny XJ9, and Powdered Toast Man, were released as playable skins for a limited-time Nickelodeon-themed event in Smite on July 12, 2022. Rocko and the additional characters for the event were revealed via a CGI trailer a week before the event's launch.
