= Joe Murray (animator) =

American animator (born 1961)

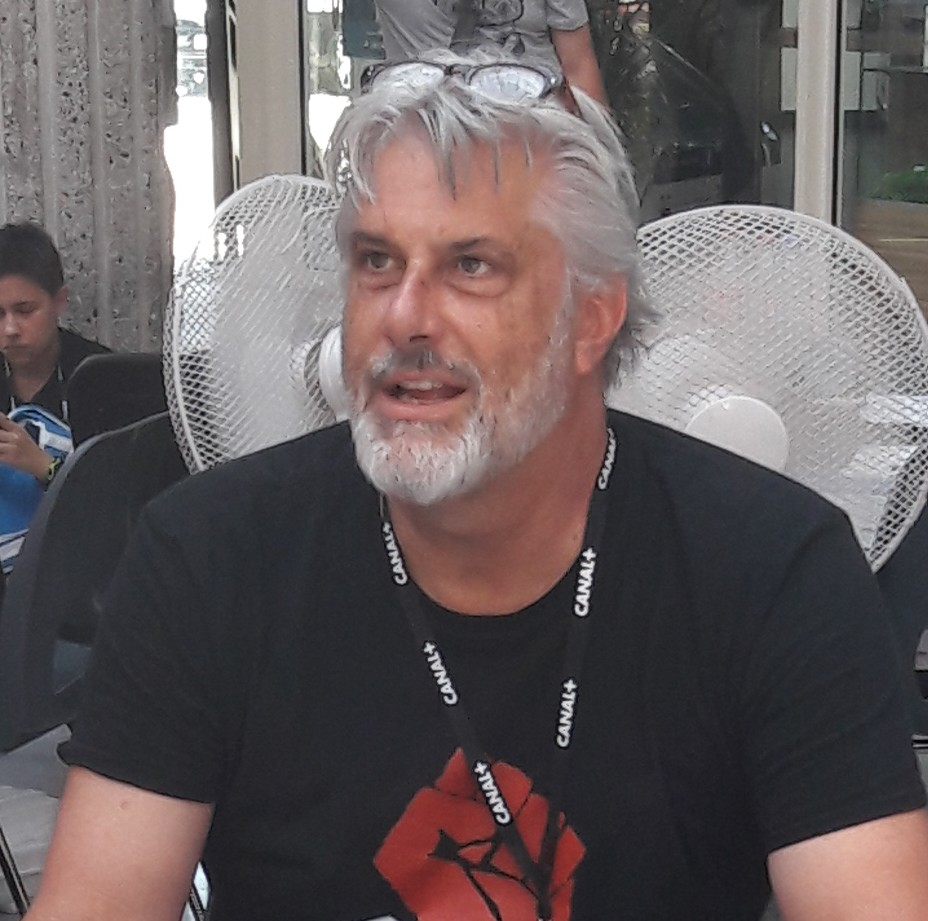
- Murray in 2017
- Born: Joseph David Murray; May 3, 1961 (age 65); San Jose, California, U.S.
- Occupations: Animator; illustrator; writer; producer; director
- Years active: 1977–present
- Known for: Rocko's Modern Life; Camp Lazlo; Let's Go Luna!
- Children: 2
- Website: http://www.joemurraystudio.com/

Signature
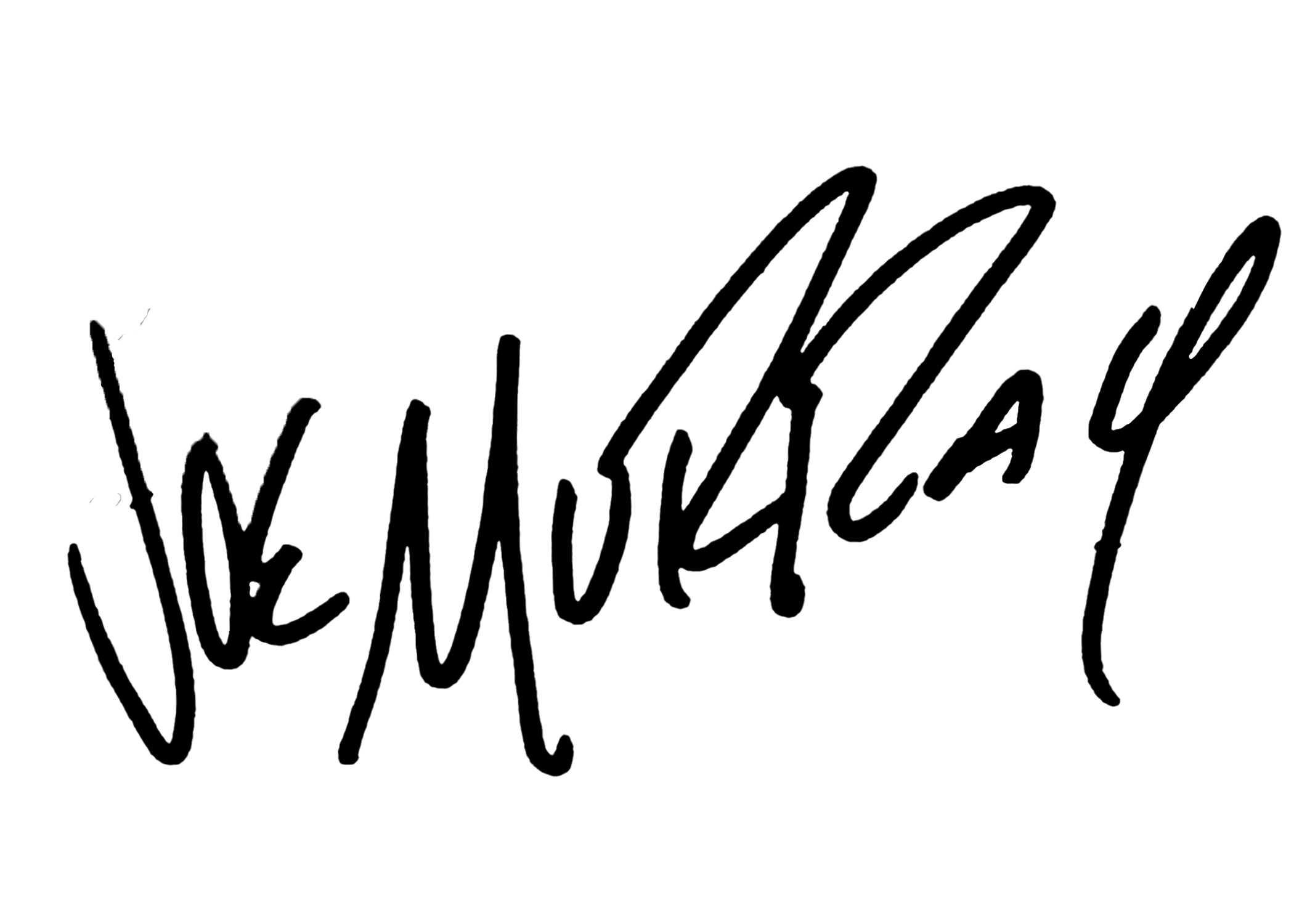

Joseph David Murray (born May 3, 1961) is an American animator, illustrator, writer, producer, and director. He is best known as the creator of Nickelodeon's Rocko's Modern Life, Cartoon Network's Camp Lazlo, and PBS Kids' Let's Go Luna!. Murray is the winner of two Primetime Emmy Awards for Camp Lazlo and the TV film Camp Lazlo: Where's Lazlo?.

== Early life ==
Born and raised in San Jose, California, Joe Murray said that he developed an interest in working as an artist as a career when he was three years old, but his father didn't approve. According to Murray, his kindergarten teacher told his mother that he was the only student who drew zippers on pants and breasts on women. Murray credits his Leland High School art teacher Mark Briggs for teaching him "so much about my art." At age 16, he became a full-time artist, drawing caricatures of people and animals at an amusement park in his spare time.

Taking the position of political cartoonist for a newspaper in San Jose, Murray's cartoons often targeted then-President Jimmy Carter. In a 2007 entry on his website, he said that he admired Carter's post-presidential work.

Murray has cited Pablo Picasso, Henri Matisse, Walt Kelly, George Baker, Mark O'Hare, Max Fleischer, Jay Ward, Frank Tashlin, Tex Avery, Bob Clampett, Chuck Jones and Walt Disney as his main influences.

== Career ==
As a young adult, Murray was hired as a designer at an agency. He invested his earnings from the company into independent animated films. At age 20, Murray founded his independent illustration company, Joe Murray Studios (or Joe Murray Productions), in 1981 while still in university. His early attempts at animation date back to 1986 when he joined De Anza College. Murray created several short animated films, his most successful was made in 1987, which was a two-minute animated short titled "The Chore," which focused on a harried husband who uses his cat as a novel solution while not wanting to do a chore for his wife. He drew the scenes on typing paper and shot the scenes with 16 mm film. For creating "The Chore" Murray earned the Merit Student Academy Award two years later in 1989. In the early 1990s, he did the storyboards and layouts on A Pup Named Scooby-Doo, Adventures of Sonic the Hedgehog, Bobby's World, and The Twisted Tales of Felix the Cat, while working as a freelancer at Drew Takahashi's now-defunct Colossal Pictures studio.

In 1988, he did two network IDs for MTV, and left in 1991 in hopes of starting his own projects. One of the MTV ID's Murray created involved the future Rocko's Modern Life character Heffer Wolfe; the ID featured Heffer being pushed out of a building with the MTV logo branded onto his buttocks.

My Dog Zero, released in 1992, was Murray's third independent film and first color film. Murray said that My Dog Zero was his "most gratifying" artistic project to date because of his own "stubbornness" in resolving the obstacles and issues involved in the production, such as lack of funding and lack of resources. With a grant he employed twelve people, mostly university students, to cel-paint the film. According to Murray, when he finished the film, several distributors refused to air it. He appeared at the Palace of Fine Arts in San Francisco with a copy of the film and persuaded the staff to air the film with the scheduled films. According to Murray, My Dog Zero received "good response".

To fund the film, Murray initially tried to pre-sell the television show rights to My Dog Zero but instead created a separate television series called Rocko's Modern Life.

=== Rocko's Modern Life ===
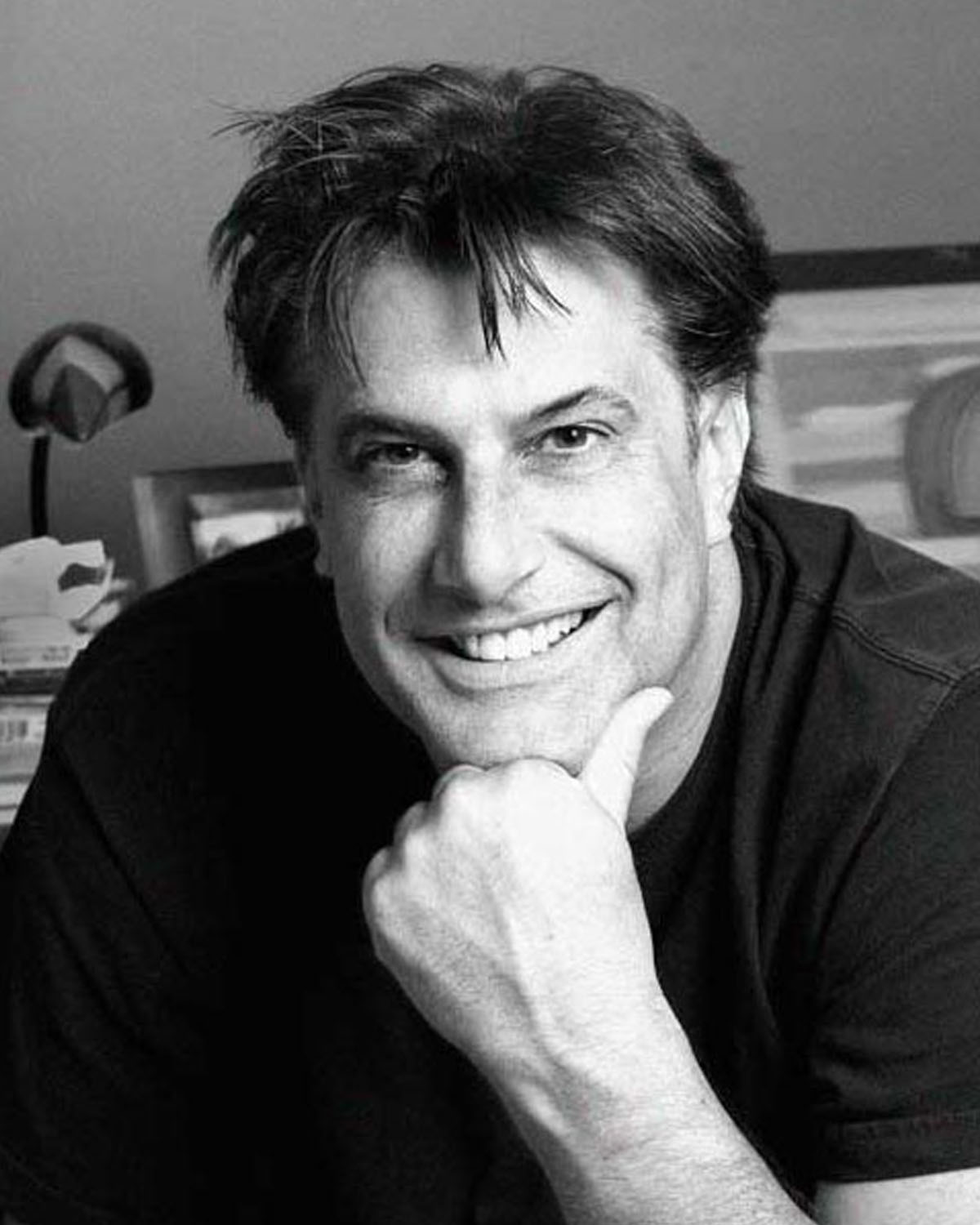
Murray in 1994

Murray created, and was the executive producer, for the animated series Rocko's Modern Life, which aired on Nickelodeon from 1993 to 1996. He voiced the character Ralph Bighead in the episodes "I Have No Son" and "Wacky Delly", and a caricature version of himself in "Short Story".

Originally, the character Rocko appeared in an unpublished comic book titled Travis. Murray tried selling the comic book in the late 1980s, but was never successful of getting it in production. Murray wanted funding for My Dog Zero, so he wanted Nickelodeon to pre-buy television rights for the series. Murray presented a pencil test to Nickelodeon Studios, which afterwards became interested in buying and airing the show. After deciding that My Dog Zero would not work as a television series, Murray combed through his sketchbooks, developed the Rocko's Modern Life concept and submitted it to Nickelodeon, believing that the concept would likely be rejected. According to Murray, around three or four months later he had "forgotten about" the concept and was working on My Dog Zero when Linda Simensky informed Murray that Nickelodeon wanted a pilot episode. Murray said that he was glad that he would get funding for My Dog Zero.

In 1992, two months prior to the production of season 1 of Rocko's Modern Life, Murray's first wife, Diane, committed suicide. Murray had blamed the show being taken as the reason for his wife's suicide. Murray felt that he had emotional and physical "unresolved issues" when he moved to Los Angeles. He describes the experience as like participating in "marathon with my pants around my ankles". Murray initially believed that he would create one season, move back to the San Francisco Bay Area and "clean up the loose ends I had left hanging". To his surprise, Nickelodeon approved new seasons.

After season 3, he decided to hand the project to Stephen Hillenburg, who mostly did work for season 4 and created SpongeBob SquarePants shortly after that; Murray continued to manage the cartoon. Murray said that he would completely leave the production after season 4. Murray said that he encouraged the network to continue production. Nickelodeon decided to cancel the series. Murray described all 52 episodes as "top notch" and that, in his view, the quality of a television show may decline as production continues "when you are dealing with volume".

=== Post-Rocko's Modern Life ===
After completing 52 episodes of Rocko's Modern Life, Murray took a break from the animation business and produced two children's books and illustrated two others: Who Asked the Moon to Dinner? (1999), The Enormous Mister Schmupsle: An ABC Adventure (2003), Hugville (written by Court Crandall) (2005), and Funny Cryptograms (written by Shawn Kennedy).

Murray was working on a web-based cartoon named The Family Pop, which was produced in Flash and was in the middle of negotiations for this cartoon just prior to the onset of Camp Lazlo. On September 30, 2008, Murray added a new feature to his website, The Tin Box, where Murray posts some of his independent work. The first work posted was "Where's Poppa", a short episode of The Family Pop.

=== Camp Lazlo ===
Murray decided to return to television cartooning, this time selling his work to Cartoon Network Studios. In 2005, he produced a pilot for the cartoon Camp Lazlo, which was picked up for a 13-episode first season and ran for five seasons, with production ending in November 2007.

On September 8, 2007, the TV movie Where's Lazlo? won an Emmy for Outstanding Animated Program (For an Hour or More). During the production of Camp Lazlo, Murray underwent a divorce.

=== Recent work ===
Once production finished for Camp Lazlo, and the final episodes were delivered, Murray developed a new television series. While he is working out details about production and distribution, he has started work on his next independent film project, Fish Head, and publishing Creating Animated Cartoons with Character, a book on creating and producing an animated TV series, and working on producing a new short series, entitled Frog in a Suit for his web network; KaboingTV.

On April 20, 2010, Murray launched a donation drive on Kickstarter to fund the project, KaboingTV, a web network entirely dedicated to cartoons. By June 5, the project surpassed its goal of $16,800 and Murray developed episodes of his Frog in a Suit series for the platform. KaboingTV premiered on March 11, 2011.

Murray created the PBS animated series Let's Go Luna!, which aired from November 2018 to November 2022.

Murray also worked on the hour-long Rocko TV special Rocko's Modern Life: Static Cling, which premiered on Netflix on August 9, 2019. This included reprising his voice role as Rachel Bighead. In October 2019, Murray and his wife relocated from California to Belgium, and at the time Murray expressed interest in developing new series for Nickelodeon Europe.

In 2023, Murray completed work on his independent film, now entitled Fiego and the Magic Fish. A reimagining of the fairy tale "The Fisherman and His Wife", the short was produced by his Garden Box Studio in Belgium and received a Cannes Film Festival award for Best Direction for an Animated Film in 2024.

== Character creation process ==
On his personal website, Murray describes his character creation process as "sometimes like playing Frankenstein".

- He starts with the personality. He shapes the conditions that make the character "tick", the character's imperfections, and the appeal. He asks himself, "Why would I want to tell stories about them?".
- If he is working with an anthropomorphic series or book with varying animals, he chooses an animal that, in his eyes, match the created personality. According to Murray, this resulted in a social caricature in Rocko's Modern Life.
- If he is working with an anthropomorphic series or book using one animal, he alters the specific character design to match the personality.
- Murray likes to vary eyeballs by size and color. He also varies nostrils. Murray believes that inconsistencies "make it more interesting".
- Murray then selects colors that, in his view, "feels right". He believes that yellow and bright colors "match a mood". If a character is "negative", he will pick a color that, in his opinion, matches the character.
- If he has to teach a crew of artists how to draw the character, he creates a model sheet for the character.

Murray explains that one of the interesting aspects of character creation is the evolution of the personalities over time. In a one-time movie, the characters will have a static personality, but for a television series, the characters will change from season to season, developing new relationships, and even changing from mere background characters into a main character.

== Filmography ==
=== Television ===
Year	Title	Role	Production company	Network	Notes
1993–1996	Rocko's Modern Life	Ralph Bighead	Games Animation	Nickelodeon	Creator, director, story, story editor, writer, main character designer, producer, executive producer, storyboard artist, layout artist, voice actor
2005–2008	Camp Lazlo	N/A	Cartoon Network Studios	Cartoon Network	Creator, writer, story, storyboard director, executive producer, storyboard artist
2018–2022	Let's Go Luna!	N/A	Brown Bag Films; 9 Story Media Group	PBS Kids	Creator, writer, executive producer

=== Films/Specials ===
Year	Title	Role	Notes
2007	Camp Lazlo: Where's Lazlo?	N/A	Creator, writer, story, storyboard artist, director
2019	Rocko's Modern Life: Static Cling	Rachel Bighead	Creator, director, writer, storyboard artist

=== Internet ===
Year	Title	Notes
2011	Frog in a Suit	Creator

== Books ==
=== Written and illustrated ===
- Who Asked the Moon to Dinner? (December 31, 1999) (Published in English and Korean)
- The Enormous Mr. Schmupsle! (August 2003)
- Crafting a Cartoon (September 12, 2008)
- Creating Animated Cartoons with Character (August 24, 2010)

=== Illustrated ===
- Funny Cryptograms (May 28, 2003)
- Hugville (December 27, 2005)

== Independent films ==
- The Chore (1987)
- My Dog Zero (1992) (Murray's third independent film)
- The Affair (2002)
- Fishing
- Fish Head
