= Rocky Rodent =

1993 video game

- North American cover art
- Developer: Irem
- Publisher: Irem
- Designer: Eigo Kasahara
- Programmer: Tetsuya Ikawa
- Composer: Rikei Hirashima
- Platform: Super NES
- Release: JP: July 30, 1993; NA: September 1993; BR: December 1993
- Genre: Platform
- Mode: Single-player

Rocky Rodent is a video game for the Super Nintendo Entertainment System released by Irem in 1993. It is known as Nitropunks: Mightheads (Note: Japanese: ニトロパンクス マイトヘッズ, Hepburn: Nitoropankusu Maitohezzu) in Japan.

== Plot and gameplay ==
When Rocky begins eating at Pie Face Balboa's restaurant, he unintentionally eats an envelope with Balboa's protection money. As a result, mobsters take Balboa's daughter. Balboa asks Rocky to rescue his daughter, promising him an All-You-Can-Eat buffet for her return.

As Rocky Rodent, the player plays a rodent who must use four various hairstyles to rescue the daughter of the owner of Rocky's favorite eatery. Rocky Rodent is a platform game with six levels with multiple stages, similar to a cross between Sonic the Hedgehog and Super Mario Bros.. Text bubbles appear during cutscenes, making the game look more like a comic book than a Saturday morning cartoon.

== Reception ==
Reception

Review scores
Publication	Score
AllGame	3/5
Electronic Gaming Monthly	7.5/10 (Note: In Electronic Gaming Monthly's review, two critics scored Rocky Rodent 7/10, two others 8/10.)
Game Players	71%
GameFan	83% (Note: In GameFan's review, Rocky Rodent was scored differently by four critics: 82%, 86%, 79%, and 85%.)
Nintendo Power	3.15/5 (Note: Nintendo Power gave Rocky Rodent two 3.3/5 ratings for graphics/sound and play control, and two 3/5 scores for challenge and theme/fun.)
Official Nintendo Magazine	73/100
Super Play	50%
Video Games (DE)	64%
Game Power	87/100
Super Action	70%
Super Gamer	41%
Super Pro	44/100
Total! (DE)	2+

The game received mixed reviews upon release.
