= Mr. Lawrence =

American voice actor and animator (born 1969)

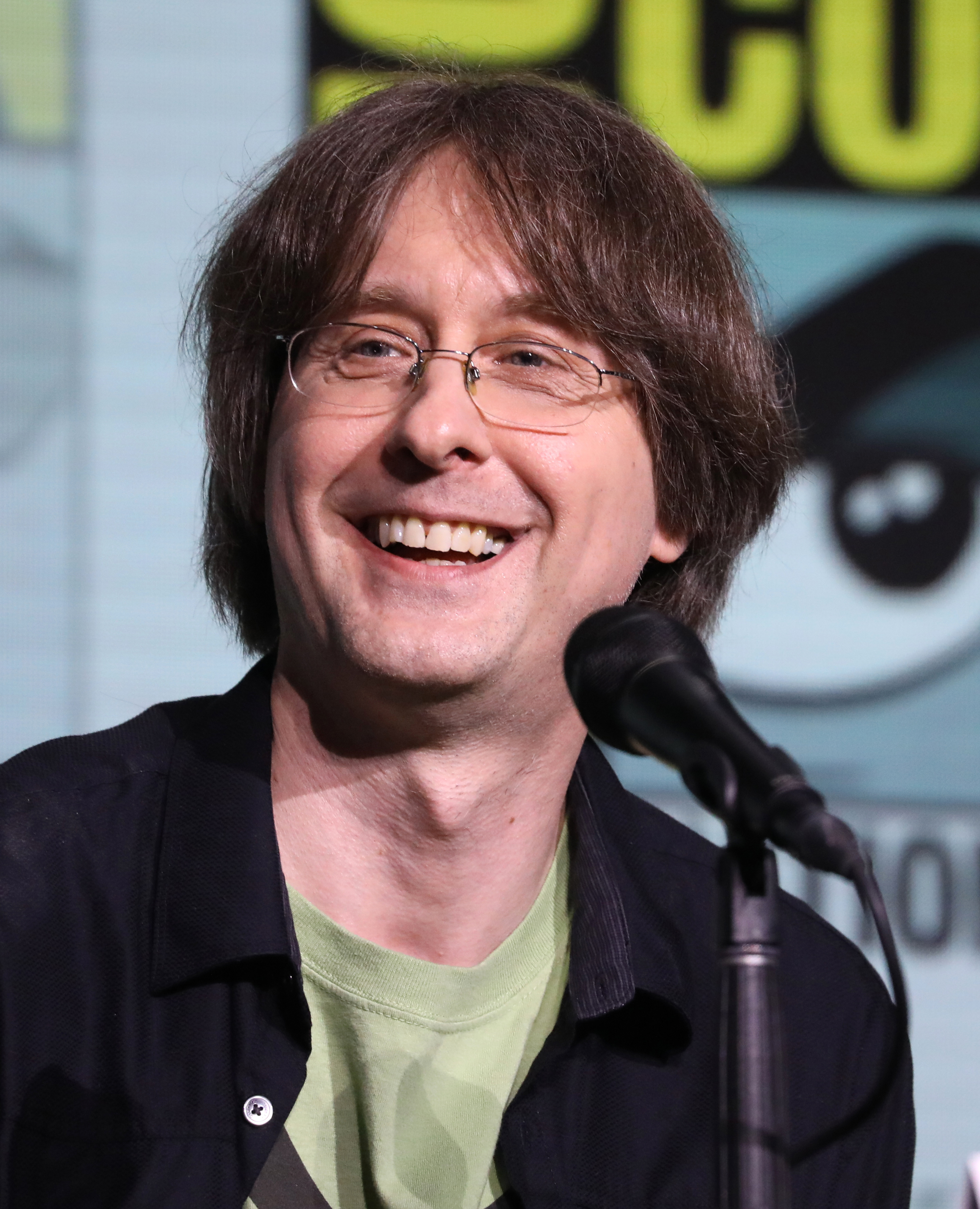
- Mr. Lawrence at the 2024 San Diego Comic-Con
- Born: Douglas Lawrence Osowski; January 1, 1969 (age 57); East Brunswick, New Jersey, U.S.
- Other name: Doug Lawrence
- Education: The Kubert School
- Occupations: Voice actor; screenwriter; animator; comedian
- Years active: 1992–present
- Spouse: Mary Ann

Douglas Lawrence Osowski (born January 1, 1969), known professionally as Mr. Lawrence, is an American voice actor, screenwriter, animator and comedian. He is best known for his work as a writer and voice actor for the Nicktoons Rocko's Modern Life/Rocko's Modern Life: Static Cling and SpongeBob SquarePants. On SpongeBob, he has provided the voice of Sheldon J. Plankton, Larry the Lobster, Fred, and various recurring characters since the show's debut in 1999.

== Early life and career ==
Lawrence grew up in East Brunswick, New Jersey. In high school, he would appear in sketch comedy live shows during the summer. He attended The Kubert School for two years, before dropping out to focus on his stand-up.

Lawrence started his animation career at Spümcø, where he was one of the few new hires alongside Peter Avanzino and Ron Hughart. He served as a layout assistant on the second season of The Ren & Stimpy Show and endured harsh working conditions under John Kricfalusi. He followed future showrunner Bob Camp and others to Games Animation, where he completed the rest of his work and switched to Joe Murray's unit. He became a major crew member on Rocko's Modern Life, voicing Filburt while directing and writing multiple episodes, a contrast to his minor role at the perpetually suffering Ren & Stimpy unit.

After Rocko, he worked as a writer (and, from season 10–18, story editor) on the animated TV series SpongeBob SquarePants. He also has long-running character roles on the show, providing the voice of Sheldon Plankton and various recurring characters, such as Fred the fish, Potty the Parrot (replacing Paul Tibbitt from season 10 onwards), the Realistic Fish-Head, and Larry the Lobster. He has also voiced Plankton in the SpongeBob Movie in 2004, along with the other installments in the SpongeBob film series and spinoffs. Mr. Lawrence also co-wrote the story and screenplay for the Plankton: The Movie, which was released on Netflix in March 2025.

He was the voice of Edward T. Platypus, Nurse Leslie, Dave, and Ping-Pong on Camp Lazlo. Lawrence also performed the voice of Manant in The Aquabats! Super Show!. Lawrence also worked as a producer on the television series Johnny Talk and as a writer on Rocko's Modern Life, The Twisted Whiskers Show and Mighty Magiswords.

As a comedian, Lawrence performed in New Jersey and Los Angeles, collaborating with comedian Jeremy Kramer and Boston comedy writer Martin Olson. Jeff "Swampy" Marsh, a storyboard writer for Rocko's Modern Life and co-creator of Phineas and Ferb, described Lawrence as bearing a "unique sense of humor", and that one "would really have to know Doug to understand (or not understand)" his style. Marsh says that the rationale for Lawrence's humor techniques and decisions "remain a mystery to us forever."

== Personal life ==
Lawrence is married and lives in Burbank, California.

== Filmography ==
=== Films and television shows ===
Year	Title	Role	Notes
1992–93	The Ren & Stimpy Show		12 episodes; layout assistant
1993–96	Rocko's Modern Life	Filburt, Additional Voices	42 episodes; also writer, storyboard artist, and director
1995–96	The Twisted Tales of Felix the Cat	Baby, Milk Vendor, Additional Voices	2 episodes; also character designer
1997	Lost on Earth		creator
1998	Toonsylvania		6 episodes; storyboard artist
1999	CatDog		story wrote episode: "It's a Wonderful Half Life/Shepherd Dog"
1999–present	SpongeBob SquarePants	Plankton, Larry the Lobster, Realistic Fish Head, Fred, Potty the Parrot (since season 10), Tom, Additional Voices	writer (1999–2002; 2009–) story editor (2016–)
2000	Hairballs	Ray	Short film
2004	The SpongeBob SquarePants Movie	Plankton, Fish #7, Attendant #2, Lloyd (voice)	
2005–08	Camp Lazlo	Edward, Dave, Ping Pong, Nurse Leslie, Additional voices	61 episodes
2007	The Grim Adventures of Billy & Mandy	Alien #2 (voice)	Episode: "Billy and Mandy Moon the Moon"
2009	The Haunted World of El Superbeasto		additional director, additional screenplay material, additional story, storyboard artist, character layout artist, character designer, and prop designer
2010	The Cartoonstitute	Joseph "Joey" Elliot Kangaroo (voice)	Episode: "Joey to the World"
2012–14	The Aquabats! Super Show!	Narrator, ManAnt (voice)	21 episodes
2015	The SpongeBob Movie: Sponge Out of Water	Plankton, Plankton Robot, News Anchor Fish, Mob Member (voice)	
2015	Uncle Grandpa	Philip (voice)	Episode: "Older"
2015	New Looney Tunes		story wrote episode: "Scarecrow"
2015–19	Mighty Magiswords	Ralphio, Jest-O the Best-O, Loch Mess Monster, Dinosaur, Additional Voices	27 episodes; also story writer (2016)
2019	Rocko's Modern Life: Static Cling	Filburt, Maitre D', Martian 1, Doug, Hopping Hessian, Doodleberg, Lizard (voice)	TV special; also writer
2020	The SpongeBob Movie: Sponge on the Run	Plankton (voice)	
2020–2023	Deer Squad	Ian (voice)	English dub
2021–2024	Kamp Koral: SpongeBob's Under Years	Plankton, Larry the Lobster, Additional Voices	39 episodes; also co-developer, writer, theme song composer and story editor
2021–present	The Patrick Star Show	Plankton, Fred, Larry the Lobster, Additional Voices	Co-developer, writer and story editor
2023	Blaze and the Monster Machines	The Baby Robot (voice)	Episode: "The Baby Robot from Outer Space"
2024	Saving Bikini Bottom: The Sandy Cheeks Movie	Plankton, Fred, Larry the Lobster, Additional Voices	
2025	Plankton: The Movie	Plankton, Rube Goldfish (voice)	Also Story and Screenwriter
2025	The SpongeBob Movie: Search for SquarePants	Plankton (voice)	Cameo

=== Video games ===
Year	Title	Role	Note
1993	Awesome Possum... Kicks Dr. Machino's Butt	Dr. Machino	
1996	Nickelodeon 3D Movie Maker	Filburt Turtle	
2000	Nicktoons Racing	Plankton	Archival recordings
2001	SpongeBob SquarePants: SuperSponge	Plankton	
2001	SpongeBob SquarePants: Operation Krabby Patty	Plankton	
2002	SpongeBob SquarePants: Employee of the Month	Plankton, Larry the Lobster	
2002	SpongeBob SquarePants: Revenge of the Flying Dutchman	Plankton, Larry the Lobster	
2003	Nickelodeon Toon Twister 3D	Plankton	
2003	SpongeBob SquarePants: Battle for Bikini Bottom	Plankton, Larry the Lobster, Prawn, Realistic Fish Head	
2004	The SpongeBob SquarePants Movie: The Video Game	Plankton	
2004	SpongeBob SquarePants: Typing	Plankton, Realistic Fish Head	
2005	Nicktoons Unite!	Plankton	
2005	SpongeBob SquarePants: Lights, Camera, Pants!	Plankton, Larry the Lobster, Realistic Fish Head	
2006	SpongeBob SquarePants: Creature from the Krusty Krab	Plankton	
2006	Spongebob SquarePants: Nighty Nightmare	Plankton	
2007	SpongeBob's Atlantis SquarePantis	Plankton	
2008	SpongeBob SquarePants Featuring Nicktoons: Globs of Doom	Plankton	
2009	SpongeBob's Truth or Square	Plankton	
2009	Borderlands	Additional Voices	
2011	Nicktoons MLB	Larry the Lobster	
2013	SpongeBob SquarePants: Plankton's Robotic Revenge	Plankton	
2015	SpongeBob HeroPants	Plankton/Plank-Ton	
2020	SpongeBob SquarePants: Battle for Bikini Bottom – Rehydrated	Plankton, Larry the Lobster, Prawn, Realistic Fish Head	Archival recordings
2023	SpongeBob SquarePants: The Cosmic Shake	Plankton, Larry the Lobster, Realistic Fish Head, Fred, Prawn, Citizens	
2023	Nickelodeon All-Star Brawl 2	Plankton, Chum Slave	
2024	SpongeBob SquarePants: The Patrick Star Game	Plankton, Fred, Realistic Fish Head	
2025	Nicktoons & The Dice of Destiny	Plankton	
2025	SpongeBob SquarePants: Titans of the Tide	Plankton, Larry the Lobster, Fred, Tom, Fish Announcer	

=== Theme parks ===
Year	Title	Role	Notes
2005	SpongeBob 4D	Plankton	

- The Food Album (1993) – album art

== Awards and nominations ==
Year	Award	Category	Result
1995	CableACE Award	Best Animated Programming Special or Series	Won
2012	Primetime Emmy Award	Outstanding Short-Format Animated Program	Nominated
