= Heffer Wolfe =

Fictional character and Rocko's best friend

- Rocko's Modern Life character
- First appearance: 1989 MTV Bumper (Shed the Jungle, Shun the Cow)
- Created by: Joe Murray
- Voiced by: Tom Kenny

In-universe information
- Full name: Heffer Wolfe (né Steer)
- Species: Cattle (Steer)
- Gender: Male
- Family: George Wolfe (adoptive father); Virginia Wolfe (adoptive mother); Peter Wolfe (adoptive brother); Cindy Wolfe (adoptive sister)
- Relatives: Hiram Wolfe (adoptive grandfather)
- Nationality: American

Heffer Wolfe is a fictional character in Nickelodeon's animated television series Rocko's Modern Life, the Netflix special Rocko's Modern Life: Static Cling and the comic book series of the same name. Tom Kenny provided the voice of the anthropomorphic steer. Heffer is best friends with the title character, Rocko.

== Conception and development ==
Joe Murray, creator of Rocko's Modern Life, partially based Heffer on an adopted friend who enjoyed bologna sandwiches and "had an interesting take on life". Heffer first appeared on an ID spot aired on MTV in 1989; the ID spot depicts Heffer as flying out of a television with the MTV logo branded on his buttocks. Heffer's design was altered to be more anthropomorphic for Rocko's Modern Life.

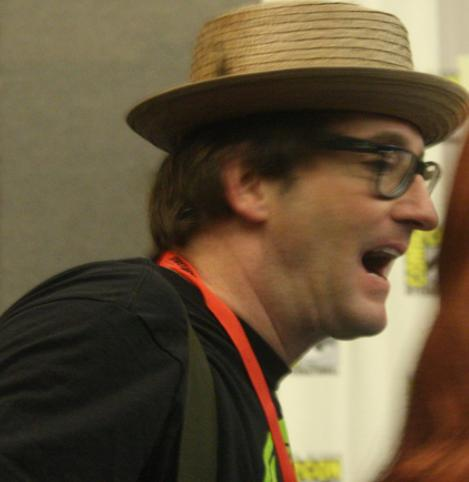
Tom Kenny voiced Heffer and was chosen for the role in a large casting call in Los Angeles.

Murray originally wrote "A Sucker for the Suck-O-Matic" as the pilot episode; the executives decided that Heffer would be "a little too weird for test audiences". Murray, instead of removing Heffer from "A Sucker for the Suck-O-Matic", decided to write "Trash-O-Madness", an episode without Heffer, as the pilot episode. Originally, Murray did not include any information about Heffer's origins in his pitch to Nickelodeon. Vince Calandra wrote Heffer's origin plotline in season 1.

Murray auditioned Tom Kenny in a large casting call in Los Angeles and chose him as the voice actor for Heffer. Kenny based Heffer's voice on the voice of a nephew of his. Kenny said that the voice was "[n]ot dead on, but some of his quirks I incorporated into the Heffer audition".

Jeff "Swampy" Marsh, a storyboard writer, says that Heffer's right eye and left nostril are "notched at the bottom" due to Murray's design style. Marsh added that the animators found keeping the sides straight "a little tricky at first" and that they referred to the design as "Tombstone-shaped".

== Character ==
Heffer was raised by wolves in O-Town who fattened him up to eat him. Eventually the wolves grew to love Heffer, so they instead raised him to adulthood. Despite their obvious differences, Heffer has no knowledge of his adoption until Rocko accidentally revealed the truth when the Wolfe family invited him for dinner. The mark which Heffer believed to be a "birthmark" on his buttocks is actually the plotting lines showing where the wolves were going to divide him.

Heffer Wolfe in the Rocko's Modern Life comic book

The Nickelodeon UK page describes Heffer as a "devoted friend" who "loves life". Heffer's lack of fear mostly stems from stupidity instead of genuine bravery. The Nickelodeon Southeast Asia website describes him as an "overgrown slob". Despite being obese, he can drive; unlike Rocko he does not wear seat belts, mostly because the seat belts do not extend enough for him to wear them comfortably. Also he seems to be a hopeless romantic at times as mentioned in "Sugar Frosted Frights", where he asks Filburt's shell while in an eight-ball mode if he will ever find true love.

Heffer holds several jobs: tree farmer, greenskeeper at a golf course, mail carrier, security guard, waiter at a café, and cashier. Despite his size, he can be unexpectedly nimble at times, most notably when he is roller skating. At the local skating rink, he is known as "The King", and performs his own skating routine at the request of the patrons. Heffer's biological father lives with a female cow named Joyce in a trailer in the Canoga Park section of the San Fernando Valley region of Los Angeles.

A shaved and elderly character resembling Heffer appears in the series finale of Camp Lazlo as the real scoutmaster; both him and the impostor were voiced by Tom Kenny. The character was designed to be Heffer himself and the scene featuring said design was already animated, but due to Nickelodeon and Cartoon Network's rivalry, Murray was forced to change his design to be legally distinct.
