= List of Camp Lazlo episodes =

This is the list of episodes of the Cartoon Network animated series Camp Lazlo. Except where specifically mentioned in the episode synopses, each half-hour episode consists of two separately titled segments. Throughout its run from 2005 to 2008, the show aired a total of 61 episodes.

The two Season 4 episodes "Strange Trout from Outer Space" and "Cheese Orbs" were chapter four in the Cartoon Network Invaded event, which originally aired on May 25, 2007. This event involved special episodes from The Grim Adventures of Billy & Mandy, Ed, Edd n Eddy, My Gym Partner's a Monkey, Foster's Home for Imaginary Friends, and Camp Lazlo.

== Series overview ==
| Season | Segments | Episodes | Originally released | |
| Season | Segments | Episodes | First released | Last released |
|---|---|---|---|---|
| Pilot | | | August 10, 2004 | |
| 1 | 26 | 13 | July 8, 2005 | September 16, 2005 |
| 2 | 25 | 13 | October 1, 2005 | June 29, 2006 |
| 3 | 25 | 13 | July 4, 2006 | February 23, 2007 |
| Shorts | N/A | 14 | November 9, 2006 | January 7, 2008 |
| 4 | 24 | 13 | February 18, 2007 | August 29, 2007 |
| 5 | 17 | 9 | September 3, 2007 | March 27, 2008 |

== Episodes ==
=== Pilot (2004) ===
Joe Murray originally created a test pilot episode of Camp Lazlo for Cartoon Network in 2004, entitled "Monkey See, Camping Doo". However, the episode never aired, but was reworked as "Gone Fishin' (Sort Of)", which became the pilot instead.

| Title | Directed and Written by | Production date |
|---|---|---|
| "Monkey See, Camping Doo" | Joe Murray | August 10, 2004 |
The Jelly Bean Cabin are sad because Leonard Lumpus (later named Algonquin) is also sad for his failure to catch the biggest fish. They need some advice about catching fish from the nurse and the deacon but they asked questions of their own. The Jellies realize that they have to do it themselves by stealing Lumpus's super-ship. When Lumpus's ship runs out of fuel, they use a canoe and trick Lumpus that they want him to help him by not talking. When Lumpus is getting eaten by a gray reef shark, they realize that they must help him and get him out of the card before catching a mighty gigantic fish. Note: The pilot was completed on August 10, 2004, when Kaz went to Los Angeles to work on the first season as a writer/storyboard artist.

=== Season 1 (2005) ===
| No. overall | No. in season | Title | Animation direction by | Written by | Storyboarded by | Original release date | Prod. code |
|---|---|---|---|---|---|---|---|
| 1a | 1a | "Gone Fishin' (Sort of)" | Brian Sheesley | Joe Murray and Mark O'Hare; Joe Murray, Mark O'Hare, and Merriwether Williams (story) | Mark O'Hare; Joe Murray (director) | July 8, 2005 | 105a |
Scoutmaster Lumpus tries to catch a fish in Leaky Lake while keeping Lazlo, Raj, and Clam away from his favorite fishing spot.
| 1b | 1b | "Beans Are from Mars" | Russell Calabrese | Rick Farmiloe and Thurop Van Orman; Steve Little, Martin Olson, and Merriwether Williams (story) | Thurop Van Orman; Rick Farmiloe (dir.) | July 8, 2005 | 105b |
The Squirrel Scouts become convinced that Lazlo, Raj, and Clam are aliens and kidnap them to investigate.
| 2a | 2a | "Snake Eyes" | Swinton O. Scott III | Mike Roth and Tom King; Steve Little, Martin Olson, and Merriwether Williams (story) | Tom King; Mike Roth (director) | July 8, 2005 | 108a |
Lazlo, Raj, and Clam befriend a garter snake they name Snakey, but it soon causes chaos around Camp Kidney.
| 2b | 2b | "Racing Slicks" | Brian Sheesley | Rick Farmiloe and Thurop Van Orman; Steve Little, Martin Olson, and Merriwether Williams (story) | Thurop Van Orman; Rick Farmiloe (dir.) | July 8, 2005 | 108b |
The campers of Camp Kidney compete in a soap box derby, with Slinkman at the wheel of the Jelly Beans' entry into the racing course.
| 3a | 3a | "Lights Out" | Brian Sheesley | Kaz and Antoine Guilbaud; Steve Little, Martin Olson, and Merriwether Williams (story) | Antoine Guilbaud; Kaz (director) | July 15, 2005 | 103a |
Scoutmaster Lumpus wants to watch a comet named after him through a telescope that passes Earth once every 50,000 years, but the lights at the Jelly Bean cabin are interfering with his viewing. However, the Jelly Beans think he has a cannon and wants to blow up the Moon. Lumpus later only sees the comet as it disappears for another 50,000 years.
| 3b | 3b | "Swimming Buddy" | Russell Calabrese | Rick Farmiloe and Thurop Van Orman; Steve Little, Martin Olson, and Merriwether Williams (story) | Thurop Van Orman; Rick Farmiloe (dir.) | July 15, 2005 | 103b |
Lazlo helps Raj overcome his fear of water so he can pass his swimming test.
| 4a | 4a | "Parasitic Pal" | Brian Sheesley | Mark O'Hare and Joe Murray (also story) | Joe Murray; Mark O'Hare (dir.) | July 22, 2005 | 101a |
After a sea lamprey attaches itself to Lazlo's head, he treats it as a new friend until it begins draining his blood.: Joe Murray said that he intended for "Parasitic Pal" to be "one of the first" episodes broadcast. Cartoon Network believed that Lazlo should be established as a character "without a leech stuck to his head", so the network broadcast "Parasitic Pal" about "4 episodes in".
| 4b | 4b | "It's No Picnic" | Russell Calabrese | Mark O'Hare; Joe Murray and Mark O'Hare (story) | Mark O'Hare (dir.) | July 22, 2005 | 101b |
A friendly picnic between Camp Kidney and Acorn Flats escalates into a competitive game of Pinecone Sitting.
| 5a | 5a | "The Weakest Link" | Lindsey Pollard | Joe Murray; Joe Murray and Mark O'Hare (story) | Joe Murray (director) | July 29, 2005 | 102a |
When Commander Hoo-Ha announces the annual camp inspection, the Bean Scouts try to keep Lazlo, Raj, and Clam out of sight, only to realize they need Lazlo's help to start a campfire.
| 5b | 5b | "Lumpy Treasure" | Swinton O. Scott III | Clayton McKenzie Morrow and Carey Yost; Steve Little, Martin Olson, and Merriwether Williams (story) | Carey Yost; Clayton McKenzie; Morrow (director) | July 29, 2005 | 102b |
The Jelly Bean trio go off in search of hidden treasure, but end up finding trouble.
| 6a | 6a | "Tree Hugger" | Swinton O. Scott III | Clayton McKenzie Morrow and Carey Yost; Steve Little, Martin Olson, and Merriwether Williams (story) | Carey Yost; Clayton McKenzie; Morrow (director) | August 5, 2005 | 104a |
Lazlo, Raj, and Clam try to stop Scoutmaster Lumpus from cutting down a rare Migrating Mulberry Tree.
| 6b | 6b | "Marshmallow Jones" | Lindsey Pollard | Mike Roth and Tom King; Steve Little, Martin Olson, and Merriwether Williams (story) | Tom King; Mike Roth (director) | August 5, 2005 | 104b |
Raj's obsession with marshmallows quickly gets him into trouble.
| 7a | 7a | "Dosey Doe" | Swinton O. Scott III | Clayton McKenzie Morrow and Carey Yost; Steve Little, Martin Olson, and Merriwether Williams (story) | Carey Yost; Clayton McKenzie; Morrow (director) | August 12, 2005 | 106a |
Scoutmaster Lumpus hosts a camp dance in an attempt to impress Jane Doe, the leader of the Squirrel Scouts.
| 7b | 7b | "Prodigious Clamus" | Lindsey Pollard | Mike Roth and Tom King; Steve Little, Martin Olson, and Merriwether Williams (story) | Tom King; Mike Roth (director) | August 12, 2005 | 106b |
Scoutmaster Lumpus attempts to profit after discovering that Clam is a genius.
| 8a | 8a | "The Nothing Club" | Brian Sheesley | Kaz and Antoine Guilbaud; Steve Little, Martin Olson, and Merriwether Williams (story) | Antoine Guilbaud; Kaz (director) | August 19, 2005 | 107a |
Edward forms an anti-Lazlo club, prompting Lazlo to create a "Nothing Club" that unexpectedly becomes more popular.
| 8b | 8b | "Loogie Llama" | Russell Calabrese | Rick Farmiloe and Thurop Van Orman; Steve Little, Martin Olson, and Merriwether Williams (story) | Thurop Van Orman; Rick Farmiloe (dir.) | August 19, 2005 | 107b |
The Jelly Beans are down in the dumps because they do not have horses like Mustangs or Appaloosas at camp. But one spitfire of a llama will soon change that.
| 9a | 9a | "Float Trippers" | Lindsey Pollard | Mike Roth and Tom King; Steve Little, Martin Olson, and Merriwether Williams (story) | Tom King; Mike Roth (director) | August 26, 2005 | 109a |
Raj panics when he loses his retainer during a canoeing excursion, and Clam and Lazlo try to cheer him up.
| 9b | 9b | "The Wig of Why" | Russell Calabrese | Kaz and Antoine Guilbaud; Steve Little, Martin Olson, and Merriwether Williams (story) | Antoine Guilbaud; Kaz (director) | August 26, 2005 | 109b |
After finding a mysterious wig, Lazlo believes it grants him clairvoyance and becomes the camp's fortune teller, only for his seemingly random predictions to come true.
| 10a | 10a | "Prickly Pining Dining" | Lindsey Pollard | Clayton McKenzie Morrow and Carey Yost; Steve Little, Martin Olson, and Merriwether Williams (story) | Carey Yost; Clayton McKenzie; Morrow (director) | September 2, 2005 | 111a |
When Camp Kidney's chef falls ill, the campers dine in Prickly Pines, where Scoutmaster Lumpus attempts to leave without paying, only to realize he has forgotten Lazlo, Raj, and Clam.
| 10b | 10b | "Camp Kidney Stinks" | Brian Sheesley | Kaz and Antoine Guilbaud; Steve Little, Martin Olson, and Merriwether Williams (story) | Antoine Guilbaud; Kaz (director) | September 2, 2005 | 111b |
After the campers cover themselves in foul-smelling stinkweed, Samson becomes obsessed with getting rid of the odor.
| 11a | 11a | "Slugfest" | Swinton O. Scott III | Clayton McKenzie Morrow and Carey Yost; Steve Little, Martin Olson, and Merriwether Williams (story) | Carey Yost; Clayton McKenzie; Morrow (director) | September 5, 2005 | 110a |
Mr. Slinkman struggles to convince Scoutmaster Lumpus to let him attend Slugfest, a festival held once every five years.
| 11b | 11b | "Beans & Weenies" | Russell Calabrese | Rick Farmiloe and Thurop Van Orman; Steve Little, Martin Olson, and Merriwether Williams (story) | Thurop Van Orman; Rick Farmiloe (dir.) | September 5, 2005 | 110b |
Lazlo, Raj, and Clam become camp celebrities after creating popular hot dogs, but their success is threatened when rivalry drives them apart.
| 12a | 12a | "Beans & Pranks" | Brian Sheesley | Kaz and Antoine Guilbaud; Steve Little, Martin Olson, and Merriwether Williams (story) | Antoine Guilbaud and Tuck Tucker; Kaz (director) | September 9, 2005 | 112a |
Scoutmaster Lumpus becomes determined to discover who is responsible for the camp's annual prank against him.
| 12b | 12b | "Movie Night" | Swinton O. Scott III | Mike Roth and Mike Kenny; Steve Little, Martin Olson, and Merriwether Williams (story) | Mike Kenny; Mike Roth (director) | September 9, 2005 | 112b |
On his birthday, Edward is forced to wait until evening before he is officially old enough to watch a horror movie, leaving Lazlo to supervise him in the meantime.
| 13a | 13a | "The Big Cheese" | Russell Calabrese | Joe Murray, Mark O'Hare, and Thurop Van Orman; Steve Little, Martin Olson, and Merriwether Williams (story) | Thurop Van Orman; Joe Murray and Mark O'Hare (dir.s) | September 16, 2005 | 113a |
When Raj receives a prized wheel of Indian cheese, Scoutmaster Lumpus becomes determined to steal it.
| 13b | 13b | "Campers All Pull Pants" | Swinton O. Scott III | Clayton McKenzie Morrow and Carey Yost; Steve Little, Martin Olson, and Merriwether Williams (story) | Carey Yost; Clayton McKenzie; Morrow (director) | September 16, 2005 | 113b |
Edward begins pulling down everyone's pants, prompting Lazlo to avoid becoming his next target.

=== Season 2 (2005–06) ===
Note: According to copyright dates, episodes 5 and 6 of this season were completed in December 2005.

| No. overall | No. in season | Title | Animation direction by | Written by | Storyboarded by | Original release date | Prod. code |
|---|---|---|---|---|---|---|---|
| 14a | 1a | "Hallobeanies" | Brian Sheesley | Clayton McKenzie Morrow and Cosmo Segurson; Kaz, Steve Little, and Merriwether Williams (story) | Cosmo Segurson; Clayton McKenzie; Morrow (director) | October 1, 2005 (Note: This episode originally premiered unannounced at 12:30 PM.) (Stealth Premiere); October 14, 2005 (Official Premiere) | 201a |
When the rest of the Bean Scouts head home for Halloween, the Jelly Beans figure Camp Kidney is the best place to spend the holiday.
| 14b | 1b | "Meatman" | Lindsey Pollard | Mike Roth and Mike Kenny; Steve Little and Merriwether Williams (story) | Mike Kenny; Mike Roth (director) | October 1, 2005 (Note: This episode originally premiered unannounced at 12:45 PM.) (Stealth Premiere); October 14, 2005 (Official Premiere) | 201b |
Chef McMuesli is insulted over the campers' criticism of his health food, so he gives a can of potted meat to the Jelly Bean cabin, which has some very unusual properties.
| 15a | 2a | "No Beads, No Business" | Swinton O. Scott III | Kaz and Antoine Guilbaud; Kaz, Steve Little, and Merriwether Williams (story) | Antoine Guilbaud; Kaz (director) | November 11, 2005 | 202a |
When Raj gets his turn to run the camp store, business is slow until Lazlo decides to help him.
| 15b | 2b | "Miss Fru Fru" | Russell Calabrese | Mike Roth and Tuck Tucker; Kaz, Steve Little, and Merriwether Williams (story) | Tuck Tucker; Mike Roth (director) | November 11, 2005 | 202b |
Jane Doe tries to pamper the Squirrel Scouts in participating in a Miss Fru Fru pageant, where the scouts refuse. After Jane Doe quits, the Squirrel Scouts host a pageant of their own to bring her back.
| 16a | 3a | "Parent's Day" | Lindsey Pollard | Sam Henderson and Mark O'Hare; Steve Little and Merriwether Williams (story) | Mark O'Hare; Sam Henderson (dir.) | November 18, 2005 | 203a |
Scoutmaster Lumpus' parents fail to visit on Parent's Day, so Lazlo and Raj masquerade as his parents to cheer him up, with unexpected results.
| 16b | 3b | "Club Kidney-Ki" | Brian Sheesley | Kaz and Antoine Guilbaud; Merriwether Williams, Steve Little, and Kaz (story) | Antoine Guilbaud; Kaz (director) | November 18, 2005 | 203b |
Lumpus can't stand the fact that Slinkman is under doctor's orders to take a vacation, so Lumpus decorates Camp Kidney Hawaiian-style, hoping to fool Slinkman.: When Lazlo remarks "I don't know where I'm gonna go when the volcano blows!", this is a quote from Jimmy Buffett's song "Volcano". Murray said in an interview that when he brainstormed to determine the song for a luau scene, he could not select a song. According to Murray, when he came to his house and heard his daughter sing "The Hokey Pokey", he created the song "The Hula Pokey" and "made up stuff about throwing poi". Murray said that he decided to use the ideas when he saw his daughter laugh.
| 17a | 4a | "Handy Helper" | Swinton O. Scott III | Mike Roth and Tuck Tucker; Merriwether Williams, Steve Little, and Kaz (story) | Tuck Tucker; Mike Roth (director) | November 25, 2005 | 204a |
Lumpus never earned his Handy Helper badge, therefore making him ineligible to be scoutmaster. Now he has to spend time with his least-favorite scout Lazlo to complete the requirements.
| 17b | 4b | "Love Sick" | Russell Calabrese | Mark O'Hare and Joe Murray; Merriwether Williams and Steve Little (story) | Joe Murray; Mark O'Hare (dir.) | November 25, 2005 | 204b |
Clam catches "lovesickness" and falls for Squirrel Scout Gretchen, so Lazlo and Raj try to snap him out of it.
| 18a | 5a | "Hello Dolly" | Brian Sheesley | Mike Roth and Kent Osborne; Merriwether Williams, Steve Little, and Kaz (story) | Kent Osborne; Mike Roth (director) | January 27, 2006 | 205a |
Edward's secret doll, Veronica, is discovered by the campers. What will he do?
| 18b | 5b | "Over Cooked Beans" | Lindsey Pollard | Clayton McKenzie Morrow and Cosmo Segurson; Merriwether Williams and Steve Little (story) | Cosmo Segurson; Clayton McKenzie; Morrow (director) | January 27, 2006 | 205b |
The hottest day at Camp Kidney is making life there miserable, at least until the Jelly Bean cabin brings an air conditioner from Prickly Pines back to camp. Making things both better and worse for everyone.
| 19a | 6a | "The Battle of Pimpleback Mountain" | Swinton O. Scott III | Kaz and Antoine Guilbaud; Merriwether Williams, Steve Little, and Kaz (story) | Antoine Guilbaud; Kaz (director) | February 17, 2006 | 206a |
Lumpus brings the Jelly Bean cabin scouts on a camping trip, using a historically important tent passed down from Lumpus' great-grandfather.
| 19b | 6b | "Dead Bean Drop" | Russell Calabrese | Clayton McKenzie Morrow and Cosmo Segurson; Merriwether Williams, Steve Little, and Kaz (story) | Cosmo Segurson; Clayton McKenzie; Morrow (director) | February 17, 2006 | 206b |
The scouts learn that many years ago, Slinkman was once a daredevil whose career was ruined by Lumpus.
| 20a | 7a | "I've Never Bean in a Sub" | Brian Sheesley | Kent Osborne and John Infantino; Merriwether Williams, Steve Little, and Kent Osborne (story) | John Infantino; Kent Osborne (dir.) | March 3, 2006 | 207a |
Lazlo tries to break the world's record for stacking beans.
| 20b | 7b | "The Great Snipe Hunt" | Lindsey Pollard | Kaz and Antoine Guilbaud; Merriwether Williams, Steve Little, and Kent Osborne (story) | Antoine Guilbaud; Kaz (director) | March 3, 2006 | 207b |
Lumpus sends the scouts on a wild-goose chase after a snipe.
| 21a | 8a | "Burpless Bean" | Russell Calabrese | Kent Osborne and John Infantino; Merriwether Williams, Steve Little, and Kaz (story) | John Infantino; Kent Osborne (dir.) | March 10, 2006 | 208a |
Edward is leading a chorus to burp the song "Camptown Races". But Lazlo does not know how to burp. Seeing that Raj and Clam will boycott the performance if he boots Lazlo from the choir, Edward has no choice but to teach Lazlo how to burp.
| 21b | 8b | "Slap Happy" | Swinton O. Scott III | Mike Roth and Stephanie Erdel; Merriwether Williams and Steve Little (story) | Stephanie Erdel; Mike Roth (director) | March 10, 2006 | 208b |
Lumpus is shocked to see that Lazlo has accidentally discovered the secret handshake of the Legume Council.
| 22a | 9a | "Snow Beans" | Swinton O. Scott III | Kent Osborne and John Infantino; Merriwether Williams and Steve Little (story) | John Infantino; Kent Osborne (dir.) | March 17, 2006 | 209a |
The Bean Scouts and the Squirrel Scouts go on a skiing trip at Mount Whitehead. However, Lumpus has to learn how to ski by Lazlo, much to the scoutmaster's dismay.
| 22b | 9b | "Irreconcilable Dungferences" | Brian Sheesley | Mark O'Hare, Clayton McKenzie Morrow, and Cosmo Segurson; Merriwether Williams and Steve Little (story) | Mark O'Hare (also dir.) | March 17, 2006 | 209b |
The Dung Beetles, Chip and Skip, get into an argument, so Lazlo tries to get them to get along again.
| 23a | 10a | "Mascot Madness" | Lindsey Pollard | Kaz and Antoine Guilbaud; Merriwether Williams, Steve Little, and Kaz (story) | Antoine Guilbaud; Kaz (director) | June 14, 2006 | 210a |
After the campers vie to become the camp mascot, Edward gets jealous because of Raj and Clam getting the mascot position. Edward tries to prevent the Jelly Beans from becoming the mascot.
| 23b | 10b | "Tomato Paste" | Brian Sheesley | Clayton McKenzie Morrow and Cosmo Segurson; Merriwether Williams and Steve Little (story) | Cosmo Segurson; Clayton McKenzie; Morrow (director) | June 14, 2006 | 210b |
Edward earns enough badges to graduate from Camp Kidney to Tomato Camp, but after watching images of the camp, he decides that he does not want to go.
| 24a | 11a | "Camp Samson" | Swinton O. Scott III | Kent Osborne and John Infantino; Merriwether Williams and Steve Little (story) | John Infantino; Kent Osborne (dir.) | June 22, 2006 | 212a |
Samson feels left out from the group, so he puts pictures of his face all over the yearbook. When the other campers are furious over his changes to the yearbook, Samson tries to get his shot at redemption.
| 24b | 11b | "Beany Weenies" | Russell Calabrese | Clayton McKenzie Morrow and Cosmo Segurson; Merriwether Williams and Steve Little (story) | Cosmo Segurson; Clayton McKenzie; Morrow (director) | June 22, 2006 | 212b |
Commander Hoo-Ha makes Ms. Mucus help the Bean Scouts pass their fitness test, but she tries to make them fail by taking them to a carnival.
| 25a | 12a | "There's No Place Like Gnome" | Brian Sheesley | Mike Roth and Stephanie Erdel; Merriwether Williams and Steve Little (story) | Stephanie Erdel; Mike Roth (director) | June 23, 2006 | 211a |
Edward gets bitten by a wood gnome and Lazlo says that if Edward gets bitten by a wood gnome, he became a gnome, but Slinkman says it is the opposite and Edward will be eaten by the gnome. In order to stop this Edward needs Lumpus' nose hair. He has to get it immediately before sunset, but it turns out Slinkman made the story up in order for Lumpus to get out of his new portable chair.
| 25b | 12b | "Hot Spring Fever" | Lindsey Pollard | Kaz and Antoine Guilbaud; Merriwether Williams, Steve Little, and Kaz (story) | Antoine Guilbaud; Kaz (director) | June 23, 2006 | 211b |
Raj and Samson fight over access to their secret hot spring. They blackmail each other by threatening to tell their gross secrets.: Joe Murray believes that Jeff Bennett, the voice actor for Samson and Raj, should have "won an award" for his work in this episode. Describing the episode as "basically Samson fighting with Raj," Murray said that viewers "never could" realize that Bennett was "jumping back and forth fighting with himself".
| 26 | 13 | "Hello Summer, Goodbye Camp" | Russell Calabrese; Brian Sheesley | Kaz, Joe Murray and Mark O'Hare; Merriwether Williams, Steve Little, Kent Osborne, and Kaz (story) | Joe Murray, Mark; O'Hare, and John; Infantino; Kaz and Kent; Osborne (directors) | June 29, 2006 | 301 |
This half-hour double episode finds the Scouts returning to Camp Kidney for the summer, only to find it closed. To prevent this from happening, Lazlo brings Raj, Clam, and Patsy on a perilous journey through the woods to find the Rock of Hope, which leads them to the Worldwide Bean Scout Jamboree to find the Big Bean to help them save Camp Kidney. However, the Big Bean is a little bean who lied to Lazlo saying his cousin Clyde sent him on the journey and that he shut Camp Kidney down. But when Lazlo finds a poem written on the inside of his hand-me-down neckerchief and realizes he went to Camp Kidney years ago, he changes his mind and decides to reopen Camp Kidney.

=== Season 3 (2006–07) ===
Note: Episodes 7 to 9 of this season have a copyright date of 2005, which could likely be a mistake, as most of production took place that year. For the same aforementioned reason, this entire season was completed by December 2006.

| No. overall | No. in season | Title | Animation direction by | Written by | Storyboarded by | Original release date | Prod. code |
|---|---|---|---|---|---|---|---|
| 27 | 1 | "7 Deadly Sandwiches" | Brian Sheesley | Joe Murray and Mark O'Hare; Merriwether Williams, Steve Little, and Kaz (story) | Joe Murray and Mark O'Hare (dir.s) | July 4, 2006 | 213 |
A two-part episode involving the Bean Scouts putting on a play about seven deadly sandwiches, with Lazlo as the director. Lumpus, looking for a chance to impress Jane Doe, tries to earn a role in the play.
| 28a | 2a | "The Big Weigh In" | Swinton O. Scott III | Clayton McKenzie Morrow and Cosmo Segurson; Merriwether Williams, Steve Little, and Kaz (story) | Cosmo Segurson; Clayton McKenzie; Morrow (director) | July 11, 2006 | 302a |
Lumpus is misled to believe he is 35 pounds underweight, leading him to go on a hunt for a lard-a-doodle bird.
| 28b | 2b | "Hard Days Samson" | Lindsey Pollard | Kent Osborne and John Infantino; Merriwether Williams and Steve Little (story) | John Infantino; Kent Osborne (dir.) | July 11, 2006 | 302b |
The Squirrel Scouts go crazy for Samson because he looks like teen idol Hanley Manster (as seen from the new issue of "DreamBoat" magazine).
| 29a | 3a | "Waiting for Edward" | Brian Sheesley | Kaz and Stephanie Erdel; Merriwether Williams and Steve Little (story) | Stephanie Erdel; Kaz (director) | July 20, 2006 | 303a |
As punishment for Chip and Skip destroying Lumpus' cabin, Slinkman makes Edward their chaperone, which becomes complicated.
| 29b | 3b | "Beans in Toyland" | Lindsey Pollard | Mike Roth and Stephanie Erdel; Merriwether Williams, Steve Little, and Kaz (story) | Stephanie Erdel; Mike Roth (director) | July 20, 2006 | 303b |
When Clam's toy airplane flies into Ms. Mucus' trailer, Clam sneaks in to get it back, only for him to discover a horde of confiscated toys.
| 30a | 4a | "Where's Clam?" | Russell Calabrese | Mike Roth and J. G. Quintel; Merriwether Williams, Steve Little, and Kaz (story) | J. G. Quintel; Mike Roth (director) | July 26, 2006 | 304a |
When Raj loses Clam in the forest, he covers his mistake by telling Lazlo that Clam is now invisible. Meanwhile, back in the forest, Clam is doing fine but he thinks he lost Raj.
| 30b | 4b | "Bowling for Dinosaurs" | Swinton O. Scott III | Mike Roth and J. G. Quintel; Merriwether Williams, Steve Little, and Kent Osborne (story) | J. G. Quintel; Mike Roth (director) | July 26, 2006 | 304b |
Lumpus tricks the Bean Scouts into digging for dinosaur bones, but his real goal is to have them dig a trench for a personal bowling alley. Even as all of the scouts walk out after realizing of their deception, Lazlo continues digging for the dinosaurs.
| 31a | 5a | "Squirrel Seats" | Lindsey Pollard | Clayton McKenzie Morrow and Cosmo Segurson; Merriwether Williams and Steve Little (story) | Cosmo Segurson; Clayton McKenzie; Morrow (director) | August 17, 2006 | 305a |
When Lazlo and Patsy want to sit together on the bus during a field trip, the Bean Scouts will do anything to prevent him from making a terrible mistake.
| 31b | 5b | "Creepy Crawly Campy" | Lindsey Pollard | Kaz and Eddie Trigueros; Merriwether Williams and Steve Little (story) | Eddie Trigueros; Kaz (director) | August 17, 2006 | 305b |
Raj is usually terrified of insects, but an oddly cute bug has him turning over a new leaf.
| 32a | 6a | "Sweet Dream Baby" | Swinton O. Scott III | Kent Osborne and John Infantino; Merriwether Williams, Steve Little, and Kent Osborne (story) | John Infantino; Kent Osborne (dir.) | August 22, 2006 | 306a |
The day before Lumpus' big speech to Grand Legume Counsel, the Jelly Beans are forced to sleep in with Lumpus after their cabin flies away from a science experiment gone wrong.
| 32b | 6b | "Dirt Nappers" | Russell Calabrese | Kent Osborne and John Infantino; Merriwether Williams, Steve Little, and Kent Osborne (story) | John Infantino; Kent Osborne (dir.) | August 22, 2006 | 306b |
When Samson goes overboard vacuuming the camp, the result is a disaster for Chip and Skip.
| 33a | 7a | "Spacemates" | Russell Calabrese | Mike Roth and J. G. Quintel; Merriwether Williams and Steve Little (story) | J. G. Quintel; Mike Roth (director) | August 29, 2006 | 307a |
Nina is convinced by a ouija board that both Chip and Skip are her soul-mates.
| 33b | 7b | "Temper Tee Pee" | Brian Sheesley | Clayton McKenzie Morrow and Cosmo Segurson; Merriwether Williams, Steve Little, and Kaz (story) | Cosmo Segurson; Clayton McKenzie; Morrow (director) | August 29, 2006 | 307b |
Edward gets sent to the "Temper Tee Pee" over his anger at losing a game of checkers to Lazlo; upon his arrival, he finds his counselor to be Chef McMuesli.
| 34a | 8a | "Lazlo Loves a Parade" | Russell Calabrese | Mike Roth and J. G. Quintel; Merriwether Williams, Steve Little, and Kaz (story) | J. G. Quintel; Mike Roth (director) | September 22, 2006 | 309a |
Lazlo, Raj, and Clam try to make the best float for the Prickly Pines Parade. But when the Squirrel Scouts realize that they don't have enough time to get a float in, they try to steal Camp Kidney's float.
| 34b | 8b | "Are You There S.M.I.T.S.? It's Me Samson" | Lindsey Pollard | Kaz and Eddie Trigueros; Merriwether Williams, Steve Little, Kaz, and Kent Osborne (story) | Eddie Trigueros; Kaz (director) | September 22, 2006 | 309b |
Samson believes he has upset S.M.I.T.S. (the Scoutmaster in the Sky), thus being pelted by sports balls wherever he goes.
| 35a | 9a | "Tusk Wizard" | Swinton O. Scott III | Kent Osborne and John Infantino; Merriwether Williams, Steve Little, and Kent Osborne (story) | John Infantino; Kent Osborne (dir.) | September 29, 2006 | 308a |
Raj falls apart when he loses his tusks because he believes that the Tusk Wizard does not know he is at Camp Kidney. He eventually gets to the point where he attempts to hitchhike to India to see the Tusk Wizard. So Lazlo dresses up like the Tusk Wizard to make Raj feel better and not leave Camp Kidney.
| 35b | 9b | "Squirrel Scout Slinkman" | Brian Sheesley | Kaz and Eddie Trigueros; Merriwether Williams and Steve Little (story) | Eddie Trigueros; Kaz (director) | September 29, 2006 | 308b |
Slinkman becomes the scoutmaster of Acorn Flats after Jane Doe and Ms. Mucus leave for vacation, but he does not seem to be doing well at his new job.
| 36a | 10a | "Bear-l-y a Vacation" | Brian Sheesley | Kent Osborne and John Infantino; Merriwether Williams, Steve Little, and Kent Osborne (story) | John Infantino; Kent Osborne (dir.) | February 2, 2007 | 310a |
Feeling that Nurse Leslie has been stressed out too much at work, the Jelly Beans decide to take him on a vacation. However, their faulty antics make Nurse Leslie more stressed than usual.
| 36b | 10b | "Radio Free Edward" | Swinton O. Scott III | Clayton McKenzie Morrow and Cosmo Segurson; Merriwether Williams, Steve Little, and Kent Osborne (story) | Cosmo Segurson; Clayton McKenzie; Morrow (director) | February 2, 2007 | 310b |
The Bean Scouts discover Camp Kidney has a radio station and decide to put on some radio shows. Edward fakes a yeti attack when his radio show does not get any listeners.
| 37a | 11a | "Valentine's Day" | Swinton O. Scott III | Mike Roth and J. G. Quintel; Merriwether Williams, Steve Little, and Kaz (story) | J. G. Quintel; Mike Roth (director) | February 9, 2007 | 403a |
Patsy writes a Valentine's Day card for Lazlo, but her father, Commander Hoo-Ha, finds her card. He forces her to beat all the Bean Scouts that she does not love. When she does not beat Lazlo, Commander Hoo-Ha will inflict a harsher punishment on him.
| 37b | 11b | "A Job Well Dung" | Lindsey Pollard | Kaz and Kim Roberson; Merriwether Williams, Steve Little, and Kaz (story) | Kim Roberson; Kaz (director) | February 9, 2007 | 403b |
The Dung Beetles, Chip and Skip, must get jobs in order to stay at Camp Kidney, or else they will have to return to their home. Scoutmaster Lumpus does not want them to leave because if they do, he will not receive a cabin upgrade. However, their new jobs involve getting Lumpus hurt in the process. When Commander Hoo-Ha plans to stay for a few days, Lumpus enlists the Dung Beetles to get rid of him with the taste of his own medicine.
| 38a | 12a | "The Bean Tree" | Lindsey Pollard | Mark "Thurop" Van Orman and Cosmo Segurson; Merriwether Williams, Steve Little, and Kaz (story) | Cosmo Segurson; Mark "Thurop" Van; Orman (director) | February 16, 2007 | 311a |
When Lazlo puts his photo on Lumpus' family tree, Lumpus starts to believe that he is his father and retires from being scoutmaster, happy with passing the camp on to his "son", Lazlo.
| 38b | 12b | "Taking Care of Gretchen" | Russell Calabrese | Mike Roth and J. G. Quintel; Merriwether Williams, Steve Little, and Kent Osborne (story) | J. G. Quintel; Mike Roth (director) | February 16, 2007 | 311b |
When Lazlo unintentionally laughs at Gretchen, she says that she will "get him", so he enlists the help of Samson to "take care" of Gretchen.
| 41a | 13a | "Scoop of the Century" | Brian Sheesley | Kent Osborne and John Infantino; Merriwether Williams, Steve Little, and Kent Osborne (story) | John Infantino; Kent Osborne (dir.) | February 23, 2007 | 312a |
Lazlo helps the Loon brothers, Dave and Ping Pong, make their camp newspaper better. When they find the "scoop of the century", their paper sells much better. Lumpus, not being permitted to read the paper due to camp rules, thinks they wrote something bad about him and becomes obsessed with reading the paper.
| 41b | 13b | "Boxing Edward" | Swinton O. Scott III | Kaz and Eddie Trigueros; Merriwether Williams, Steve Little, and Kaz (story) | Eddie Trigueros; Kaz (director) | February 23, 2007 | 312b |
Edward tries to mail himself out of Camp Kidney, but he is repetitively denied due to a lack of stamps. He tries to borrow stamps from the other scouts, but they want to be mailed as well.

=== Shorts (2006–08) ===
These shorts were featured on television and on podcasts, and were created without the involvement of the creator, Joe Murray.

| No. | Title | Original release date |
|---|---|---|
| 1 | "Empty Nest" | November 9, 2006 |
Lumpus is determined to get a photo of a rare bird in order to win a big cash prize.
| 2 | "The Eternal Flame" | November 22, 2006 |
After winning a baked bean eating contest, Lazlo realizes that his stomach is getting gassy. During the presentation, Lazlo makes flatulence, which blows up the camp.
| 3 | "Nudist Camp" | April 9, 2007 |
Lazlo accidentally took Lumpus' clothes while he is bathing in the lake. Lumpus tries to get back to his cabin before anyone sees him naked.
| 4 | "Hiccups" | April 23, 2007 |
Clam gets the hiccups, thus leading Lazlo and Raj to help him get rid of them.
| 5 | "Survival of the Lamest" | June 4, 2007 |
Lumpus gets lost in the woods with Lazlo and must keep himself from going crazy.
| 6 | "A Chip and Skip Cartoon: Marooned Maroons" | June 11, 2007 |
While swimming in the lake, the Dung Beetles find themselves "stranded" on a raft.
| 7 | "Tales from the Campfire" | June 18, 2007 |
The Bean Scouts tell lousy horror stories at a campfire.
| 8 | "Mail Dominance" | July 2, 2007 |
Edward gains jealousy when he does not receive any mail and Lazlo receives a lot of mail.
| 9 | "A Chip and Skip Cartoon: Outhouse on Haunted Hill" | July 8, 2007 |
Chip and Skip feel afraid to use the toilets during a thunderstorm. Note: This title was named after the movie House on Haunted Hill.
| 10 | "Laid Off Lumpus" | July 16, 2007 |
Lumpus believes that Commander Hoo Ha is going to "give him the axe".
| 11 | "A Chip and Skip Cartoon: My Brother's Eater" | August 17, 2007 |
Edward tires of hearing Chip and Skip talk on walkie-talkies. So he plays a prank on them, making Chip think he has eaten his brother.
| 12 | "A Chip and Skip Cartoon: Hair and Gone" | August 20, 2007 |
After Samson tells them that they have no hair, Chip and Skip try to look for hair.
| 13 | "A Chip and Skip Cartoon: Mi Casa, Eew Casa" | December 17, 2007 |
While Chip and Skip's filthy cabin is being fumigated, Slinkman tells them to stay at Samson's tidy cabin. Samson instantly feels disgust when Chip and Skip dirty his cabin.
| 14 | "A Chip and Skip Cartoon: The Amazing Race" | January 7, 2008 |
Edward's plan to finally beat Lazlo in the big canoe race by cheating takes him and the Dung Beetles on a shortcut to Loserville.

=== Season 4 (2007) ===
Note: Episode 3 of this season (in broadcast order) has a copyright date of 2006. This could likely be a mistake, as most of production began in September of that year.

| No. overall | No. in season | Title | Animation direction by | Written by | Storyboarded by | Original release date | Prod. code |
|---|---|---|---|---|---|---|---|
| 39 | 1 | "Where's Lazlo?" | Joe Murray, Mark O'Hare, and Brian Sheesley | Joe Murray, Mark O'Hare, and Merriwether Williams (story) | Joe Murray and Mark O'Hare | February 18, 2007 | 401 |
| 40 | 2 | "Where's Lazlo?" | Joe Murray, Mark O'Hare, and Brian Sheesley | Joe Murray, Mark O'Hare, and Merriwether Williams (story) | Joe Murray and Mark O'Hare | February 18, 2007 | 402 |
When Lazlo disappears after meeting a bear, the camp assumes he has been mauled, while Clam and Raj refuse to accept that explanation. The story is told by Raj and Clam after all of this. The camp members speculate about Lazlo's fate, wondering if the bear devoured Lazlo or if Lazlo found himself lost around Prickly Pines.
| 42a | 3a | "Strange Trout from Outer Space" (Note: This episode, along with its sister episode, were the fourth of five chapters for a special network event titled "Cartoon Network Invaded", a month-long event that featured five different shows having alien invasions.) | Brian Sheesley | Mike Roth and J. G. Quintel; Merriwether Williams, Steve Little, and Kaz (story) | J. G. Quintel; Mike Roth (director) | May 25, 2007 | 407a |
Aliens abduct Samson and want cheese. Finding Samson of no use to them, the aliens release him. Upon his return, he finds three new campers arrive from Canada, and Samson is certain that they are the aliens in disguise, so he sets out to prove it.
| 42b | 3b | "Cheese Orbs" (Note: This episode, along with its sister episode, were the fourth of five chapters for a special network event titled "Cartoon Network Invaded", a month-long event that featured five different shows having alien invasions.) | Swinton O. Scott III | Cosmo Segurson and Kimberly Roberson; Merriwether Williams, Steve Little, and Kaz (story) | Kimberly Roberson; Cosmo Segurson (director) | May 25, 2007 | 407b |
With their search failed at Camp Kidney, the aliens hope to get luckier in their search for cheese in Acorn Flats, where the Squirrel Scouts are preparing the annual Cheese Festival.
| 43a | 4a | "Hold It Lazlo" | Lindsey Pollard | Mike Roth and J. G. Quintel; Merriwether Williams, Steve Little, and Kent Osborne (story) | J. G. Quintel; Mike Roth (director) | June 6, 2007 | 313a |
Edward loses a drinking contest to Lazlo, infuriating Edward. He tries to stop Lazlo from using the bathroom as revenge.
| 43b | 4b | "Being Edward" | Russell Calabrese | Mark "Thurop" Van Orman and Cosmo Segurson; Merriwether Williams, Steve Little, Kaz, and Kent Osborne (story) | Cosmo Segurson; Mark "Thurop" Van; Orman (director) | June 6, 2007 | 313b |
Edward puts "Edward Day" on the calendar for the next day (so everyone will worship him), only to find that everyone is acting like Edward, particularly Clam.
| 44a | 5a | "Award to the Wise" | Russell Calabrese | Kent Osborne and John Infantino; Merriwether Williams, Steve Little, and Kent Osborne (story) | John Infantino; Kent Osborne (dir.) | June 13, 2007 | 404a |
Lazlo wins an award, but the other Bean scouts grow jealous. So Lazlo tries to appease them by giving them their own awards. Things go out of hand when Lazlo makes the awards out of toilet paper.
| 44b | 5b | "Cave Chatter" | Brian Sheesley | Kaz and Eddie Trigueros; Merriwether Williams, Steve Little, and Kaz (story) | Eddie Trigueros; Kaz (director) | June 13, 2007 | 404b |
Samson uses a frozen caveman to talk to, but the Jelly Bean trio find his icy buddy and try to thaw him out, much to Samson's dismay.
| 45a | 6a | "Ed's Benedict" | Lindsey Pollard | Cosmo Segurson and Kim Roberson; Merriwether Williams, Steve Little, and Kaz (story) | Kim Roberson; Cosmo Segurson (dir.) | June 20, 2007 | 405a |
Edward is extremely annoyed with campers teasing him with jokes about laying eggs. But when he actually seems to lay one, he grows extremely fond of it.
| 45b | 6b | "The Book of Slinkman" | Russell Calabrese | Kaz and Eddie Trigueros; Merriwether Williams, Steve Little, and Kaz (story) | Eddie Trigueros; Kaz (director) | June 20, 2007 | 405b |
Due to a mailing error, Slinkman receives the Squirrel Scout Handbook, in which Camp Kidney turns upside down with all the new rules.
| 46a | 7a | "Never Bean on the Map" | Swinton O. Scott III | Kent Osborne and John Infantino; Merriwether Williams, Steve Little, and Kaz (story) | John Infantino; Kent Osborne (dir.) | June 27, 2007 | 406a |
The Jelly Bean trio realize that Camp Kidney is not on a placemat map at a local restaurant in Prickly Pines, which leads them to go to great lengths to get the camp on it.
| 46b | 7b | "Harold & Raj" | Lindsey Pollard | John Infantino and Piero Piluso; Merriwether Williams, Steve Little, and Kaz (story) | Piero Piluso; John Infantino (dir.) | June 27, 2007 | 406b |
Harold (the walrus scout) decides that he wants to be with the "cool scouts" (mostly with Raj).
| 47a | 8a | "Lumpus vs. the Volcano" | Russell Calabrese | Cosmo Segurson and Kimberly Roberson; Merriwether Williams, Steve Little, and Kaz (story) | Kimberly Roberson; Cosmo Segurson (dir.) | July 11, 2007 | 408a |
A volcano spirit gets angry at Lumpus when he refuses to sacrifice his chicken pot pie.
| 47b | 8b | "Nursemaster" | Brian Sheesley | John Infantino and Piero Piluso; Merriwether Williams, Steve Little, and Kaz (story) | Piero Piluso; John Infantino (dir.) | July 11, 2007 | 408b |
Nurse Leslie feels he is not respected in camp, which leads him to applying for a job at Acorn Flats.
| 48a | 9a | "Dungs in Candyland" | Brian Sheesley | Mike Roth and J. G. Quintel; Merriwether Williams, Steve Little, and Kaz (story) | J. G. Quintel; Mike Roth (director) | July 18, 2007 | 409a |
When Slinkman goes on a candy confiscation rampage, Samson uses his chemistry set to make candy, with disastrous results.
| 48b | 9b | "Tour Wars" | Swinton O. Scott III | Mike Roth and J. G. Quintel; Merriwether Williams, Steve Little, and Kaz (story) | J. G. Quintel; Mike Roth (director) | July 18, 2007 | 409b |
Edward and the Jelly Bean trio are in competition to start a tour business.
| 49a | 10a | "Lazlo's First Crush" | Brian Sheesley | John Infantino and Piero Piluso; Merriwether Williams, Steve Little, and Kaz (story) | Piero Piluso; John Infantino (dir.) | July 25, 2007 | 410a |
Lazlo develops a huge crush on the mermaid of Leaky Lake. And when Raj goes in the lake to give the mermaid a piece of his mind, he falls in love with her, too.
| 49b | 10b | "Living La Vida Lumpus" | Russell Calabrese | Cosmo Segurson and Kim Roberson; Merriwether Williams, Steve Little, and Kaz (story) | Kim Roberson; Cosmo Segurson (dir.) | July 25, 2007 | 410b |
After some convincing from Lumpus, Lazlo starts to dislike Camp Kidney. Lumpus initially likes his new attitude, but when Lazlo becomes too much like Lumpus, Lumpus consults with Raj and Clam to return Lazlo to his delightful, optimistic self.
| 50a | 11a | "Samson's Mail Fraud" | Brian Sheesley | Kaz and Mark O'Hare; Merriwether Williams, Steve Little, and Kaz (story) | Mark O'Hare; Kaz (director) | August 15, 2007 | 411a |
After Samson gets picked on for not having friends outside of camp, he makes a lie about getting letters from a famous magician.
| 50b | 11b | "The Haunted Coffee Table" | Swinton O. Scott III | Kaz and Ant Ward; Merriwether Williams, Steve Little, and Kaz (story) | Ant Ward; Kaz (director) | August 15, 2007 | 411b |
Slinkman and Raj confront a haunted coffee table that was apparently damaged by Lumpus.
| 51a | 12a | "Friendward" | Russell Calabrese | Mike Roth and J. G. Quintel; Merriwether Williams, Steve Little, and Kaz (story) | J. G. Quintel; Mike Roth (director) | August 22, 2007 | 412a |
Edward attempts the unthinkable—he tries to make a friend.
| 51b | 12b | "Camp Dinkey" | Brian Sheesley | John Infantino and Piero Piluso; Merriwether Williams, Steve Little, and Kaz (story) | Piero Piluso; John Infantino (dir.) | August 22, 2007 | 412b |
The Bean Scouts dream up their ideal camp when they find a sign for a camp called "Camp Dinkey".
| 52a | 13a | "Doting Doe-Eyed Deerest" | Swinton O. Scott III | Cosmo Segurson and Kim Roberson; Merriwether Williams, Steve Little, and Kaz (story) | Kim Roberson; Cosmo Segurson (dir.) | August 29, 2007 | 413a |
Jane Doe is driven to the very brink of insanity when the Bean Scouts bunk with her after seeing the pampering she's given to the Dung Beetles.
| 52b | 13b | "Clown Camp" | Brian Sheesley | Kaz and Ant Ward; Merriwether Williams, Steve Little, and Kaz (story) | Ant Ward; Kaz (director) | August 29, 2007 | 413b |
Lumpus decides to make every day Clown Day, despite Lazlo's fear of clowns.

=== Season 5 (2007–08) ===
Note: According to an old journal entry by series creator Joe Murray, this entire season was completed by November 2007.

| No. overall | No. in season | Title | Animation direction by | Written by | Storyboarded by | Original release date | Prod. code |
|---|---|---|---|---|---|---|---|
| 53a | 1a | "Edward's Big Bag" | Swinton O. Scott III | John Infantino and Cosmo Segurson; Merriwether Williams, Steve Little, and Kaz (story) | John Infantino and Cosmo Segurson (directors) | September 3, 2007 | 501a |
When Edward steals all the Bean Scouts' sleeping bags on a camping trip, an odd sleeping bag creature shows up.
| 53b | 1b | "The List" | Russell Calabrese | Kaz and Ant Ward; Merriwether Williams, Steve Little, and Kaz (story) | Ant Ward; Kaz (director) | September 3, 2007 | 501b |
Edward must complete a list of good deeds as penance for "accidentally" hurting Lazlo.
| 54a | 2a | "Camp Complain" | Sue Perrotto | J. G. Quintel; Merriwether Williams, Steve Little, and Kaz (story) | J. G. Quintel (director) | September 4, 2007 | 502a |
Slinkman organizes a group (Lazlo, Edward, Samson, and Harold) to address camp complaints. However, they seem to be more interested in playing a pinball machine instead of addressing complaints.
| 54b | 2b | "The Engagement" | Brian Sheesley | Mark O'Hare; Merriwether Williams, Steve Little, and Kaz (story) | Mark O'Hare (director) | September 4, 2007 | 502b |
Lumpus is heartbroken after Jane Doe gets engaged to Prickly Pines' mayor Pothole McPucker, so he tries to break them up.
| 55a | 3a | "Call Me Almondine" | Russell Calabrese | John Infantino and Cosmo Segurson; Merriwether Williams, Steve Little, and Kaz (story) | John Infantino and Cosmo Segurson (directors) | September 5, 2007 | 503a |
Squirrel Scout Almondine ponders the meaning of being pretty to prepare for a pageant.
| 55b | 3b | "Clam the Outlaw" | Swinton O. Scott III | Mike Kenny; Merriwether Williams, Steve Little, and Kaz (story) | Mike Kenny (director) | September 5, 2007 | 503b |
Clam becomes an outlaw after a scuffle with Scoutmaster Lumpus.
| 56a | 4a | "Penny for Your Dung" | Sue Perrotto | Kaz and Ant Ward; Merriwether Williams and Steve Little (story) | Ant Ward; Kaz (director) | September 6, 2007 | 504a |
Chip and Skip wreak havoc on the camp as they search for their favorite penny.
| 56b | 4b | "Baby Bean" | Brian Sheesley | Kaz and Ant Ward; Merriwether Williams and Steve Little (story) | Ant Ward; Kaz (director) | September 6, 2007 | 504b |
After Raj gets obsessed with using multiple labor-saving devices, he regresses into an infant.
| 57 | 5 | "Kamp Kringle" | Brian Sheesley | Joe Murray and Mark O'Hare; Merriwether Williams and Steve Little (story) | Joe Murray and Mark O'Hare (directors) | December 7, 2007 | 509 |
Santa vacations at Camp Kidney after his workshop is destroyed, but soon decides not to return home or resume toy making. Unfortunately, Lumpus has taken over the toy factory and has become a tyrant to the elves.
| 58a | 6a | "Bad Luck Be a Camper Tonight" | Russell Calabrese | John Infantino; Merriwether Williams and Steve Little (story) | John Infantino (director) | March 6, 2008 | 505a |
Lazlo inherits bad luck from Samson, so they consult to the Scoutmaster in the Sky in order to fix it.
| 58b | 6b | "Step Clam" | Swinton O. Scott III | Mark O'Hare; Merriwether Williams and Steve Little (story) | Mark O'Hare (director) | March 6, 2008 | 505b |
Clam pretends to be Nina's brother to get her in the sisterhood club.
| 59a | 7a | "S Is for Crazy" | Sue Perrotto | John Infantino and Cosmo Segurson; Merriwether Williams and Steve Little (story) | Cosmo Segurson and John Infantino (directors) | March 13, 2008 | 506a |
A jellyfish attaches itself to Samson's head, frying his brain, and he and Lumpus start chaos. Unfortunately, Samson's pranks go too far when his parents (who turn out to be jellyfish) call to visit the camp.
| 59b | 7b | "Samson Needs a Hug" | Brian Sheesley | Derek Drymon; Merriwether Williams and Steve Little (story) | Derek Drymon (director) | March 13, 2008 | 506b |
Lazlo hugs everyone (except Samson) when Samson is the one who needs a hug.
| 60a | 8a | "Wedding Bell Blues" | Russell Calabrese | John Infantino and Cosmo Segurson; Merriwether Williams and Steve Little (story) | Cosmo Segurson and John Infantino (directors) | March 20, 2008 | 507a |
Lumpus and Jane Doe plan to get married, but Jane's arm gets stuck inside Raj's trunk.
| 60b | 8b | "O Brother, Who Art Thou" | Swinton O. Scott III | Kaz; Merriwether Williams and Steve Little (story) | Kaz (director) | March 20, 2008 | 507b |
Under request of Mr. Slinkman, Edward's older brothers pay a visit to Camp Kidney to discipline the Bean Scouts.
| 61a | 9a | "Peace Frog" | Brian Sheesley | Joe Murray and Mark O'Hare | Joe Murray and Mark O'Hare (directors) | March 27, 2008 | 508a |
Lumpus, having a mid-life crisis, buys a new SUV which causes problems when the campers try to train their frogs for the Leap Frog competition.
| 61b | 9b | "Lumpus' Last Stand" | Sue Perrotto | John Infantino; Merriwether Williams, Steve Little, and Kaz (story) | John Infantino (director) | March 27, 2008 | 508b |
Lumpus discovers that by using wet paint instead of clothing, he is finally free from the bondage of laundry. Soon, the other campers catch on. At the end of the episode, Lumpus is revealed to have been an impostor all along: the real scoutmaster arrives and has Lumpus arrested and sent to a mental hospital.
