= Mother Goose and Grimm (TV series) =

- Also known as: Grimmy (season 2)
- Genre: Comedy
- Created by: Mike Peters
- Based on: Mother Goose and Grimm by Mike Peters
- Written by: Mark Evanier; Gordon Kent; Earl Kress
- Directed by: Ron Myrick; Vincent Davis
- Voices of: Charlie Brill; Greg Burson; Eddie Deezen; Mitzi McCall
- Composer: Ron Grant
- Country of origin: United States
- Original language: English
- No. of seasons: 2
- No. of episodes: 26

Production
- Executive producers: Lee Mendelson; Phil Roman; Mike Peters
- Producer: Bob Curtis
- Editors: Julie Gustafson; Tom Syslo
- Running time: 23 minutes
- Production companies: Lee Mendelson Film Productions; Film Roman; Grimmy, Inc. Tribune Media Services; MGM/UA Television Production Group

Original release
- Network: CBS
- Release: September 14, 1991 – 1992

Mother Goose and Grimm, also known as Grimmy for the second season, is an American animated television series that premiered September 14, 1991, on CBS. The show is an adaptation of Mike Peters's comic strip of the same name. The Saturday morning cartoon was produced by Bob Curtis, and written by Mark Evanier. The second season contains reruns of previous season episodes.

== Cast ==
- Charlie Brill – Grimmy
- Greg Burson – Attila
- Eddie Deezen – Ham, Sam, Cam, and Pam
- Mitzi McCall – Mother Goose

=== Additional voices ===
- Pete Barbutti
- Gregg Berger
- Jack Burns
- Steve DeVorkin
- Harlan Ellison
- June Foray
- Stan Freberg
- Tress MacNeille
- Howard Morris
- Hal Rayle
- Neil Ross

== Episodes ==
No.	Title	Written by	Directed by
1	Puppy Love Story	Mark Evanier	Jeff Hall & Vincent Davis
1	Brotherhood of Ham	Mark Evanier	Ron Myrick
2	Expensive Taste	Mark Evanier	Ron Myrick
2	Lassie Swim Home	Gordon Kent	Vincent Davis
3	Funny Business	Mark Evanier	Ron Myrick & Vincent Davis
3	The Boogie Man	Mark Evanier	Jeff Hall
4	Grimm Encounter	Mark Evanier	Jeff Hall
4	The Grocery Grabber	Mark Evanier	Klay Hall
5	Ham Alone	Mark Evanier	Jeff Hall & Ron Myrick
5	Sheep Thrills	Gordon Kent	Vincent Davis
6	Hero Worship	Mark Evanier	Jeff Hall
6	The Search For Soap	Earl Kress	Vincent Davis
7	The Fur Flies	Mark Evanier	Jeff Hall
7	It's a Flea Country	Mark Evanier	Vincent Davis
8	Bone of Contention	Mark Evanier	Jeff Hall
8	The Sweeper Creeper	Mark Evanier	Ron Myrick
9	The Wickedest Witch	Mark Evanier	Ron Myrick
9	Motel Mutt	Mark Evanier	Vincent Davis
10	Pussycat Pooch	Mark Evanier	Klay Hall
10	Open All Night	Mark Evanier & Mike Peters	Klay Hall
11	Getaway Grimmy	Mark Evanier	Ron Myrick
11	Tail of a Puppet	Mark Evanier	Vincent Davis
12	The Egg and Us	Mark Evanier	Ron Myrick
12	Hyde and Go Seek	Mark Evanier	Vincent Davis
13	Trash Night Trouble	Mark Evanier	Ron Myrick & Vincent Davis
13	Mirror Monster	Mark Evanier	Jeff Hall

== Reception ==
Charles Solomon of the Los Angeles Times praised the series for "preserving the look" of the comic strip, and for "[having] a good sense of the characters' personalities", but was disappointed with the "flat timing and pedestrian direction" of the program.
