= Slugfest =

Slugfest may refer to:

- Slugfest, a baseball term for a high scoring game
- SlugFest, a pinball-like arcade game produced by WMS Industries
- "Slugfest" (Camp Lazlo) television series episode
- Ken Griffey, Jr.'s Slugfest, a baseball game for the Nintendo 64 and Game Boy Color
- Slugfest (Transformers), the name of several fictional characters in the various Transformers universes
