= Charlotte Peters =

American television host (1913–1988)

- Born: Charlotte Wiedmann; 1913; St. Louis, Missouri, U.S.
- Died: December 28, 1988 (aged 75); Northwoods, Missouri, U.S.
- Occupation: Television show host
- Known for: The Charlotte Peters Show
- Relatives: Mike Peters (son)

Charlotte Peters (1913 – December 28, 1988), née Wiedmann, was a television show host based in St. Louis, Missouri. She was the first woman in St. Louis to have a live talk show.

== Early life ==
Peters attended school through eighth grade.

She was a housewife in Webster Groves, Missouri, when she made appearances on To The Ladies, a midday St. Louis talk show. Her entertainment career developed further when she heard an advertisement for auditions for amateurs for television; she won the contest. She contacted impresario Billy Rose and auditioned for him. He offered her a one-year contract, but she did not want to go to New York, so she declined.

== The Charlotte Peters Show ==
The Charlotte Peters Show was a weekday live variety television show. It aired at noon on KSD-TV from 1956 to 1964 and then on KTVI until 1970. It was unrehearsed and much audience participation was involved.

While the show focused on local personalities, Peters had celebrities on the show occasionally, including Eddie Fisher, Bob Hope, Minnesota Fats, and Alfred Hitchcock. Jonathan Winters said it was the fastest-moving television show he had ever seen.

Stan Kann served as musical director and co-host of the show. Phyllis Diller substituted for Peters in 1963.

When the show's run ended, it was one of the few remaining daytime variety shows still on the air. The final episode aired on July 10, 1970. Peters had urged viewers not to attend the Festival of Life that yippies were hosting in Forest Park. Some one hundred protesters showed up at KTVI. Peters was informed of her show's cancellation that day. Station management said that viewership had been down.

== Personal life and death ==
Peters' husband, William Peters, died in 1974.

Her son, Mike Peters, is a Pulitzer Prize-winning cartoonist of Mother Goose and Grimm fame. Her daughter Patricia Schwarz's family operated Charlotte's Rib, a barbecue restaurant named after Peters, in Ballwin, Missouri.

Peters died in 1988 in Northwoods, Missouri, at a nursing home where she had lived for several years. She was buried at Resurrection Cemetery in Affton, Missouri.
