= Free for All (TV series) =

2003 American animated sitcom

- The main cast of Free for All. From left to right: Angus, Sylvia Jenkins, Douglas Jenkins, Johnny Jenkins, Clay Zeeman, and Paula Wisconsin.
- Genre: Sitcom; Off-color humor Satire
- Created by: Brett Merhar
- Developed by: Merriwether Williams
- Written by: Merriwether Williams; Gil Ferro; Jeffrey Poliquin; Brett Merhar ("The Deal")
- Directed by: Dave Marshall
- Voices of: Jonathan Silverman; Brett Merhar; Sam McMurray; Mitzi McCall; Juliette Lewis; Dee Bradley Baker
- Opening theme: Free for All by Felix the Cat
- Ending theme: Free for All (instrumental)
- Country of origin: United States
- Original language: English
- No. of seasons: 1
- No. of episodes: 7

Production
- Executive producers: Merriwether Williams; Brett Merhar
- Editor: Gil Ferro
- Running time: 24–26 minutes
- Production companies: Film Roman; Showtime Networks

Original release
- Network: Showtime
- Release: July 11 – September 12, 2003

Free for All is an American animated sitcom created by Randall Brett Merhar and developed by Merriwether Williams for Showtime. The series, set in Colorado, follows the day-to-day life of Johnny Jenkins, an innocent 19-year-old college student who has to deal with a bitter, cigarette-smoking grandmother and a coarse, sometimes-violent, alcoholic father, in a rather dysfunctional family while his friend, Clay, is living large with the settlement money he got from suing a taco restaurant for personal injuries.

The show was developed for television by Merriwether Williams, the head writer for the first three seasons of SpongeBob SquarePants. The show lasted for only seven episodes that aired over the summer of 2003, the last ending on a cliffhanger. Despite favorable to mixed reviews from critics, the show had very low ratings due to poor promotion. Showtime canceled the animated series shortly after the last episode aired. It was later released on iTunes and Amazon.com.

== Characters ==
- Johnny Jenkins, the main character of the series, is a quiet, shy, blonde nineteen-year-old and the main character of the show. Johnny wears blue jeans, sneakers and a black T-shirt whose anthropomorphic smiley face mimics Johnny's real expression or emotion (which goes completely unnoticed by other characters). When the naïve Johnny is not getting into trouble through his own fault, he is usually being bullied or pressured into dangerous, reckless and bizarre rituals of immature privilege by his rich best friend, Clay Zeeman.
- Clay Zeeman is a tall, charismatic, cunning, and evil friend of Johnny's. Having become filthy-rich before the story plot by faking an accident at Taco Hell, Clay now lives with his ferret Angus (which he rescued from an animal testing lab) in a luxury penthouse apartment on top of a skyscraper. Yet, he repeatedly commits insurance fraud and tax evasion to further increase his fortune. His obsession with money drives him to attempt to bribe and blackmail IRS employees and beat up his own friends just because they do not argue in favor of tax cuts like he does. Clay prefers to spend his masses of leisure time either playing video games and consuming drugs with Angus or with women in his Ferrari. He has tall, spiked, orange hair.
- Angus is Clay's manic, attitudinal and violent drug-addicted pet ferret. Angus regularly consumes any drug imaginable (vicodin, marijuana, wood glue, cocaine, and experimental fertility drugs to name a few). He is typically worn like a stole around Clay's neck much of the time when he is not in a social setting. He is physically cruel to Johnny, and his actions include defecating into his shoes and biting his genitals. In each episode, Angus goes into a drug-induced fantasy which usually alludes to his sub-plot.
- Sylvia Jenkins is Johnny's ancient, wrinkled, nymphomaniac and chain-smoking grandmother, who is ashamed of her entire family, particularly of her son Douglas (Johnny's father). Sylvia, Douglas and Johnny live in the same house, which is a cause for frequent tensions. Sylvia has lusted over and successfully had a large number of men, some of which include Clay Zeeman, Eminem, an army ranking officer, an ogre, a doctor's husband and Tom Jones. She frequently torments Johnny about him having the room upstairs that she wants deeply, even to the point of being willing to quit her 100-year record of smoking. Her menacing cackle is usually cut short due to an attack of smoker's lung.
- Douglas Jenkins, Johnny's father, is an overweight severe alcoholic, suffers from incontinence and is occasionally prone to violence. He carries out his job as an office supplies salesman with a particular lack of success and, due to his chronic bankruptcy, constantly attempts to get Clay to invest in useless business ideas. Clay, however, always rejects due to his lack of respect for Douglas. In the seventh episode, he finally gets Clay to invest in the idea of a bar exclusively for tall people (Clay was bullied for his height as a child). However, Clay ends up firing Douglas due to his instability, questionable behavior towards guests and overall incompetence. Douglas has blond hair (like his son Johnny), a mustache, and a round belly. At all times, he is either drunk or depressed; nonetheless he is always helpless and dependent. Douglas has absolutely no respect for Johnny, as in his eyes, Johnny ruined his life as an unintended child. His mother always seems to be solving all of his problems, even if it means by arranging a date or handling the excesses of his incontinence.
- Paula Wisconsin is Johnny's next-door neighbor, his childhood friend, and object of his desire. Johnny is hopelessly in love with Paula that is unrequited due to Johnny's reluctance of admitting his love and Paula's obliviousness. Most episodes revolve around Johnny getting himself into awkward situations as an attempt to impress Paula. While Paula is supportive of Johnny's escapades, she still remains completely in the dark about his true intentions. It is somewhat implied that Paula is not liked by most people, as some scenes have shown that many people she encounters (including Sylvia) refer to her as a "tree-hugging bitch" due to her vapid pretentiousness.
- Omar is Johnny's best friend who is of Indian heritage. He attends the same college and is just as immature, naïve and shy, sometimes even more extremely than Johnny. The two of them frequently become victims of violence, mostly by Johnny's father or by their "classmates".
- Johnny's mother does not appear in the series; her name is not mentioned. In the first episode, Douglas states to Johnny that they met during his half year at college and she skipped town after giving birth, leaving Douglas to raise Johnny alone.

== Development ==
In 1992, Free for All began life as an alternative comic strip published in college newspapers. The comic became nationally syndicated shortly afterwards, but eventually ended in 1998. A short pilot for the series—which was never aired on television—was made in 2001. Brett Merhar pitched the show to Showtime in 2001 as an animated series, wanting to do edgier jokes than what he could do in the comic. He brought in a friend of his, Merriwether Williams, who was, at the time, the head writer for Nickelodeon's SpongeBob SquarePants. She worked on Free for All as showrunner and head writer alongside her duties as writer for SpongeBob SquarePants. The show had three writers: Jeff Poliquin (future writer for Comedy Central's short-lived animated sitcom Ugly Americans, and former writer for The Simpsons video games), Gil Ferro (who also served as the show's editor), and Williams herself; Brett Merhar, from Rapid City, South Dakota, also co-wrote the first episode, "The Deal", with Williams.

The show had an all-star cast:

- Jonathan Silverman, from the 1980s farce/dark comedy Weekend at Bernie's, was the voice actor for Johnny.
- Brett Merhar himself voiced Clay Zeeman (originally, Jeremy Piven was going to voice Clay, but Piven turned down the offer).
- Longtime voice actor Dee Bradley Baker provided vocal effects for Angus the ferret.
- Juliette Lewis, known for such films as National Lampoon's Christmas Vacation and Natural Born Killers, voiced next-door neighbor Paula Wisconsin.
- Mitzi McCall voiced Sylvia Jenkins.
- Sam McMurray (who did voicework on such shows as Dinosaurs and The Simpsons) was the voice of Johnny's father, Douglas.

The show's animation was interesting, as it was a combination of CGI LightWave animation (cars/some buildings/panning backgrounds), and traditional hand drawn animation/backgrounds—drawn in pencil and ink on animation paper, then scanned into a computer and colored with Wacom tablets on ToonBoom Harmony. The show's animation was produced at Film Roman in Los Angeles and outraced to Yearim in South Korea. Dave Marshall, a former animation director for Animaniacs, was the series director. William Reiss and C. H. Greenblatt, two SpongeBob SquarePants veterans, worked on the show as storyboard artists. The two of them would go on to work on the Disney Channel hit series Fish Hooks, while C. H. Greenblatt would also go on to create Chowder for Cartoon Network, and Harvey Beaks for Nickelodeon. Both Fish Hooks and Chowder would become far more successful and profitable than Free for All.

=== Cancelation and death of creator ===
After the show was canceled, Merhar went on to create a web series with Gábor Csupó titled Beverly Hills Anger Management, which premiered on YouTube in 2007.

In 2016, a 46-year-old Merhar got into a dispute with a man near the parking lot of a store. During the dispute, the man struck Merhar in the head with a metal pipe. Shortly thereafter, police arrived, and Merhar was taken to the hospital where he was pronounced dead the next day. 30-year-old Travis Bateman, his killer, was arrested and charged with murder. Police were able to identify Bateman using video footage from a nearby store and witness accounts.

Williams went on to write for Cartoon Network's Camp Lazlo as the head writer, as well as Johnny Test (also on Cartoon Network), My Little Pony: Friendship Is Magic (on The Hub, now Discovery Family), and Pound Puppies (also on The Hub/Discovery Family).

== Episodes ==
No.	Title	Original release date
1	"The Deal"	July 11, 2003
Clay keeps Grandma at bay in exchange for Johnny detoxifying Angus.
2	"Tootsie"	July 18, 2003
Paula entrusts Johnny with her dog, Tootsie, but he soon loses the pooch.
3	"Sterile Angus"	July 25, 2003
Grandma wants a new stole, so she kidnaps Angus to breed him for more fur.
4	"Hostage Johnny"	August 15, 2003
Johnny becomes a teacher's assistant to impress Paula, but is taken hostage.
5	"Scammer Clay"	August 22, 2003
Clay's finances are frozen by the IRS, so he starts a business with Johnny, Omar and his dad. Meanwhile, Grandma learns she has a STD.
6	"Nude Johnny"	September 5, 2003
Johnny poses nude for Paula's art class, then gets thrown in jail with Clay.
7	"Tall Tails"	September 12, 2003
Clay and Dad buy their own bar, Johnny and Omar start their own fraternity, and Grandma becomes addicted to the Home Shopping Network.
