= Lindsey Pollard =

Canadian animator

- Born: Victoria, British Columbia, Canada
- Known for: Animation
- Notable work: Camp Lazlo, The Chain Letter, Family Guy, The Simpsons Movie, Summer Camp Island
- Awards: Emmy Award; 2007; Pulcinella Award; 2007; Norman McLaren Award; 1994 Grand Prize; Montreal World Film Festival; 1994 Best Animation; Emily Award; 2008 Recognition of Outstanding Achievement

Lindsey Pollard is a Canadian animator from Victoria, British Columbia, now residing in Los Angeles, California. Her work as an animation director on the children's Cartoon Network series Camp Lazlo garnered three Pulcinella awards, two Emmy nominations, and a 2007 Emmy win. In 1994, she received The Grand Prize Norman McLaren Award and won "Best Animation" in the Montreal World Film Festival for her student film The Chain Letter. As a member of The Emily Carr Institute Alumni, she received The Emily Award in Recognition of Outstanding Achievement in 2008. Lindsey was an assistant director on The Simpsons Movie and a timer on My Gym Partner's a Monkey, The Simpsons, Drawn Together, The Fairly OddParents, The Oblongs, Baby Blues, The Cramp Twins, and Mission Hill. She is currently a retake director on the Emmy award-winning hit series Family Guy.
