= Charlie Brill =

American actor, voice artist, and comedian

- Born: Charlie Sanford Brill; January 13, 1938 (age 88); Brooklyn, New York, U.S.
- Occupations: Actor; comedian; voice artist
- Years active: 1958–2010
- Spouse: Mitzi McCall (m. 1960; died 2024)
- Children: 1

Charlie Sanford Brill (born January 13, 1938) is an American actor, voice artist, and comedian.

== Career ==
Brill's first motion picture was The Beast of Budapest. He appeared in Blackbeard's Ghost and The Amazing Dobermans. He played Klingon spy Arne Darvin in the Star Trek episode "The Trouble with Tribbles" (1967) and reprised the role nearly 30 years later in the Star Trek: Deep Space Nine episode "Trials and Tribble-ations" (1996). He and his wife Mitzi McCall played Capt. Harry Lipschitz and Mrs. Frannie Lipschitz on the long-running series Silk Stalkings.

Brill and McCall performed sketch comedy on The Ed Sullivan Show on the same episode as The Beatles' first appearance on February 9, 1964. They were interviewed in 2005 for the "Big Break" episode of PRI radio program This American Life regarding their Beatles-Sullivan experience, including a dressing room encounter with John Lennon.

In 1968 and 1969, Brill and McCall appeared on Rowan and Martin's Laugh-In, but only as the violently bickering couple in "The Fun Couple" sketches. Brill was a frequent panelist, along with McCall, on the 1970’s celebrity-couples game show Tattletales. Brill portrayed Robert, the hairdresser on the short-lived 1979 NBC series, Supertrain.

Brill has been working as a voice actor in animation. On television, he supplied the voice of the main character Grimmy in the animated series of Mother Goose and Grimm (which starred Mitzi McCall as Mother Goose) and in several movies, including voices in the two Flintstones features Hollyrock-a-Bye Baby and I Yabba-Dabba Do!. He also voiced King Poppin' Lockin' and a tired artist in an episode of the hit Cartoon Network series Grim & Evil. He has voiced several other characters in three other shows by Hanna-Barbera, including Tom & Jerry Kids; Droopy, Master Detective; and Yo Yogi!.

== Personal life ==
Brill was married to actress and comedienne Mitzi McCall from 1960 until her death in 2024. They have one daughter.

== Filmography ==
=== Film ===
| Year | Title | Role | Notes |
|---|---|---|---|
| 1958 | The Beast of Budapest | Josef | |
| 1968 | Blackbeard's Ghost | Edward | |
| 1976 | The Amazing Dobermans | Professor | |
| 1978 | Matilda | Barker | |
| 1980 | Midnight Madness | Tenant #1 | |
| 1980 | Pray TV | Dr. Ramirez | |
| 1980 | Seems Like Old Times | Court clerk | Uncredited |
| 1981 | Longshot | Moe | |
| 1982 | Young Doctors in Love | Doctor Quick | |
| 1983 | Off the Wall | Doctor Quick | |
| 1983 | The Man Who Wasn't There | Rastafani | |
| 1986 | The Malibu Bikini Shop | Sol Felderman | |
| 1988 | Bloodstone | Inspector Ramesh | |
| 1989 | W.B., Blue and the Bean | Alan | |
| 1989 | Deep Blood | Ben's Father | |
| 1990 | Wishful Thinking | Marty Anderson | |
| 1990 | Dead Men Don't Die | Director | |
| 2000 | Boys Life 3 | Winkler | |
| 2010 | Limbo Lounge | Devil | |

=== Television ===
| Year | Title | Role | Notes |
|---|---|---|---|
| 1958 | Broken Arrow | Pina | Episode: "The Duel" |
| 1958 | Man with a Camera | Shivvy Brewster | Episode: "Closeup on Violence" |
| 1964 | The Ed Sullivan Show | Mr. Brill (The Office of McCall and Brill sketch) | Episode: February 9, 1964 (Beatles 1st American Appearance) |
| 1966 | My Mother the Car | Baxter | Episode: "Over the Hill to the Junkyard" |
| 1967 | Good Morning World | Milton Pervis | Episode: "Knits to You, Sir" |
| 1967 | Star Trek: The Original Series | Arne Darvin | Episode: 'The Trouble with Tribbles" |
| 1968–1969 | Rowan & Martin's Laugh-In | Regular Performer | 10 episodes |
| 1975 | Police Woman | Di Marco | Episode: "Pattern for Evil" |
| 1977 | One Day at a Time | Dr. Harold Granger | Episode: "Ann's Crisis" |
| 1978 | CHiPs | Tow-Truck Driver | Episode: "Neighborhood Watch" |
| 1979 | Wonder Woman | Mr. Smith | Episode: "Going, Going, Gone" |
| 1979 | Supertrain | Robert | 5 episodes |
| 1979 | Archie Bunker's Place | Levy | Episode: "Bosom Partners" |
| 1979 | Young Love, First Love | Mr. Quinlan | Television film |
| 1980 | One Day at a Time | Artie Morgan | Episode: "No Laughing Matter" |
| 1981 | The Incredible Hulk | Solly Diamond | Episode: "King of the Beach" |
| 1982 | 9 to 5 | Fricano | Episode: "Herassment" |
| 1982 | Hart to Hart | Marty Willis | Episode: "Harts and Fraud" |
| 1984 | Simon & Simon | Mr. Valente | Episode: "Double Play" |
| 1984 | Fame | Jennings | Episode: "Stages" |
| 1985 | E/R | Charlie / Pete the Bartender | 2 episodes |
| 1985 | Diff'rent Strokes | Joe | Episode: "Love on the Run" |
| 1985, 1987 | 1st & Ten | Ron / Director | 2 episodes |
| 1986 | Scarecrow and Mrs. King | Jango Hart | Episode: "Wrong Number" |
| 1986 | Sledge Hammer! | Suspect | Episode: "They Shoot Hammers, Don't They?" |
| 1987 | Hill Street Blues | Robert DiNapoli | Episode: "It Ain't Over Till It's Over" |
| 1987 | New Monkees | Harvey Porkbladder B.D.D. | Episode: "Test Tube Tube" |
| 1987 | Murder, She Wrote | Rudy | Episode: "Witness for the Defense" |
| 1988 | The Munsters Today | Douglas Carswell CEO | Episode: "Corporate Munsters" |
| 1989 | Charles in Charge | Jamal | Episode: "Chargin' Charles" |
| 1989 | Jake and the Fatman | Henry Casano | Episode: "They Can't Take That Away from Me" |
| 1990 | Without Her Consent | Court Clerk | Television film |
| 1990 | Dragnet | Bartender | Episode: "Housewife Hunter" |
| 1990 | Married... with Children | Eugene Bundy | Episode: "And Baby Makes Money" |
| 1991 | They Came from Outer Space | Art Decko | Episode: "Animal Magnetism" |
| 1991 | Yo Yogi! | Voice | 9 episodes |
| 1991–1992 | Mother Goose and Grimm | Grimmy | 10 episodes |
| 1992 | Flying Blind | Saul | Episode: "The Secret of My Great Dress" |
| 1993 | I Yabba-Dabba Do! | Additional voices | Television film |
| 1993 | FBI: The Untold Stories | Agent Moran | Episode: "Mary" |
| 1993–1999 | Silk Stalkings | Capt. Harry Lipschitz / Myron | 129 episodes |
| 1996 | Ellen | Del Shapiro | Episode: "Too Hip for the Room" |
| 1996 | Star Trek: Deep Space Nine | Barry Waddle | Episode: "Trials and Tribble-ations" |
| 1998 | Sliders | Barry Lipschitz | Episode: "Lipschitz Live!" |
| 1998–1999 | Suddenly Susan | Leon | 3 episodes |
| 2001 | For Your Love | Briggs | Episode: "The Replacements" |
| 2001 | Port Charles | Tom Murphy | 3 episodes |
| 2002 | 7th Heaven | Mr. Tallridges | 2 episodes |
| 2006 | The Grim Adventures of Billy & Mandy | Irwin's Grandpa / Tired Artist | 2 episodes |
| 2007 | The Suite Life of Zack & Cody | John | Episode: "Club Twin" |
