= Camp Lazlo =

American animated television series

- Genre: Comedy
- Created by: Joe Murray
- Creative director: Mark O'Hare
- Voices of: Carlos Alazraqui; Jeff Bennett; Tom Kenny; Mr. Lawrence; Jodi Benson; Jill Talley; Steve Little
- Theme music composer: Andy Paley; Joe Murray (lyrics)
- Opening theme: "Lazlo Was His Name-O" (parody of the children's song "Bingo")
- Composer: Andy Paley
- Country of origin: United States
- Original language: English
- No. of seasons: 5
- No. of episodes: 61 (117 segments); 14 (shorts); (list of episodes)

Production
- Executive producers: Brian A. Miller; Joe Murray
- Producers: Shareena Carlson (seasons 1–2); Janet Dimon (seasons 3–5)
- Running time: 22 minutes
- Production company: Cartoon Network Studios

Original release
- Network: Cartoon Network
- Release: July 8, 2005 – March 27, 2008

Camp Lazlo is an American animated television series created by Joe Murray for Cartoon Network. The series follows Lazlo, an anthropomorphic spider monkey who goes to a camp called "Camp Kidney", a Boy Scout–like summer camp in the Pimpleback Mountains. Lazlo resides in the "Jelly Bean" cabin with his fellow Bean Scouts; Raj, an Indian elephant, and Clam, a pygmy rhinoceros. Lazlo is often at odds with his pessimistic camp leader, Scoutmaster Lumpus the moose, but usually gets along well with the second-in-command, Slinkman the banana slug, and other campers. Camp Kidney sits just across the lake from Acorn Flats, which is home to the campsite of the all-female Squirrel Scouts (which function somewhat similarly to the Girl Scouts).

Camp Lazlo was produced by Cartoon Network Studios. Its style of humor is similar to the Nickelodeon series Rocko's Modern Life, which Murray also created and worked on, albeit more well-suited for a younger audience. Camp Lazlo premiered on Cartoon Network on July 8, 2005, and ran for five seasons comprising 61 episodes and the hour-long television special, Where's Lazlo?. The final episode aired on March 27, 2008. During its run, the series won three Primetime Emmy Awards and three Pulcinella Awards, and was nominated for another Emmy and an Annie Award. Spin-off media include DVDs, restaurant promotions, a video game, and digital download releases.

== Premise ==
=== Plot and characters ===
The series is set in a universe inhabited solely by anthropomorphic animals of many species and focuses on a trio of campers attending a poorly run Boy Scout–like summer camp known as Camp Kidney. The trio consists of Lazlo, the eccentric, optimistic spider monkey; Raj, the timid Indian elephant; and Clam, the taciturn albino pygmy rhinoceros who rarely speaks in full sentences and usually speaks in short bursts of few words, often repeating the last words that others say, and their multiple surreal misadventures.

Other characters include the selfish, ill-tempered moose Scoutmaster Lumpus and his mild-mannered assistant Slinkman the banana slug, the boys' assortment of fellow campers including the disgruntled, surly platypus Edward, the unintelligent, dirt-loving dung beetle twin brothers Chip and Skip, the klutzy, accident-prone, geeky Guinea pig Samson and the twin loon brothers, Dave and Ping Pong. There's also a frenemy summer camp called Acorn Flats, which is attended solely by girls, primarily focusing on Lazlo, Raj, and Clam's respective female counterparts attending that camp; Patsy the adventurous mongoose who has a major crush on Lazlo, Gretchen the short-tempered alligator and Nina the bookish, sci-fi-loving giraffe, along with the object of Scoutmaster Lumpus' affections, Miss Jane Doe (a female deer), the head of Acorn Flats, and her grumpy assistant, Ms. Rubella Mucus (a warthog).

Murray said that, as he did in Rocko’s Modern Life, he matched the personalities of characters to various animals.

Some episodes may involve the Bean Scouts' attempts at unveiling the truth behind camp legends or clowning around, infuriating their peers or placing themselves in a variety of odd situations commonly based around traditional or fictionalized, bizarre camp activities.

=== Setting ===
The setting of the series was designed to deliberately bring a nostalgic feeling of childhood summer camps and "evoke a comfortable place to visit". The colors instill the feeling of summer camp, rather than basing color schemes on real-life colors; Murray and Sue Mondt, the art directors, chose the colors. In Camp Lazlo, the sky can be yellow, and trees are not always green and brown. For the architecture and objects, books with cabins, camps and Native American artifacts were consulted. Ultimately, Murray wanted to create a place where nature prevails, and the hustle and bustle of real-life is left behind, with no technology to distract from the impressions of camp life. He describes the camp as having a "retro" feel. Murray likes 1950s and early 1960s designs of objects like advertising art, lamps, and old vacation brochures, and he said that the "brushy quality that developed at that time" heavily influenced the setting.

- Camp Kidney, set in the Pimpleback Mountains next to Leaky Lake, is the camp where most of the show takes place. This is a summer camp attended by a group of boy scout-like campers called The Bean Scouts. In keeping the theme of the name of the camp, the campers are allowed to name their cabins after various types of beans: Jelly Cabin, Pinto Cabin, Fava Cabin, and so on. The camp is known for a low standard of quality and has been threatened with closure more than once. The camp is led by Scoutmaster Lumpus, with most of the administrative details assigned to his assistant, Mr. Slinkman. A full staff complements the camp, including a nurse and a chef.
- Acorn Flats is across the lake from Camp Kidney, attended by girls of similar age, called the Squirrel Scouts. Acorn Flats has higher quality facilities than Camp Kidney, a point of contention between the two respective camps, with Acorn Flats being the more dominant in the rivalry. The leader of the Squirrel Scouts is Jane Doe, and her grumpy assistant, Ms. Rubella Mucus (a warthog). Both Camp Kidney and Acorn Flats are part of a larger hierarchical organization, under the direct command of a militant bison named Commander Hoo-ha, and "The Big Bean" the head of all scout chapters, which includes Beans and Squirrels and (possibly) Tomato Scouts.
- Prickly Pines is a town near both camps with full commercial facilities: a post office, several restaurants, a laundromat, and other sundry stores.

== Episodes ==
Season	Segments	Episodes	Originally released	
Season	Segments	Episodes	First released	Last released
Pilot			August 10, 2004	
1	26	13	July 8, 2005	September 16, 2005
2	25	13	October 1, 2005	June 29, 2006
3	25	13	July 4, 2006	February 23, 2007
Shorts	N/A	14	November 9, 2006	January 7, 2008
4	24	13	February 18, 2007	August 29, 2007
5	17	9	September 3, 2007	March 27, 2008

== Production ==
=== Development ===
After Rocko's Modern Life concluded production in 1996, series creator Joe Murray kept a notebook of ideas for television shows and books. Murray attributes some of his most fond memories to days at summer camp; Murray said that he attended summer camp every summer for "4 or 5 years in a row" and that he "couldn't really get the scouting thing down". He also described cartoons with pastoral settings, such as the Bugs Bunny cartoons of the Looney Tunes and Merrie Melodies series and Yogi Bear, as having a "calming" effect due to the tree-filled backgrounds. At the time he believed that too many futuristic themes appeared in media and literature, so he wished to create a series that would "get back to nature". Murray was also inspired by John Candy’s own summer camp-themed cartoon series Camp Candy.

Camp Lazlo originated from a camp-related children's book series concept by Murray that, according to him, "outgrew its medium". As Murray developed the concept, he felt that his "lunatic characters wanted to live" and decided that a simple story could not sufficiently house his characters. Murray desired to create a series about a group of children without "high tech stimulus" and "in nature".

Linda Simensky, who had previously worked with Murray on Rocko's Modern Life, had since moved to Cartoon Network and called Murray to solicit a new series. Development of the pitch began in mid-2003. After an initial hesitation, Murray sent Simensky the idea for a show with a working title of 3 Beans. Simensky "thought it sounded too much like a salad", so Murray changed the name to Camp Lazlo. Following approval, Murray began production at Cartoon Network Studios in collaboration with his own company, Joe Murray Productions, and appointed Mark O'Hare as co-producer.

According to Murray, the greenlight to produce Lazlo had been initially given and later revoked, leaving Murray and Mark O'Hare "pissed" and "depressed". Murray believed that an executive was not "completely sold" by the series, and worked to have the series receive definite approval. Production of Camp Lazlo began in 2004 and ended in 2007; November 2007 saw the beginning of the series' final production run. The series would later have writers that would go on to create their own shows, such as Thurop Van Orman, who later created The Marvelous Misadventures of Flapjack in 2008, and J. G. Quintel, who later created Regular Show in 2010 and Close Enough in 2020.

=== Writing ===
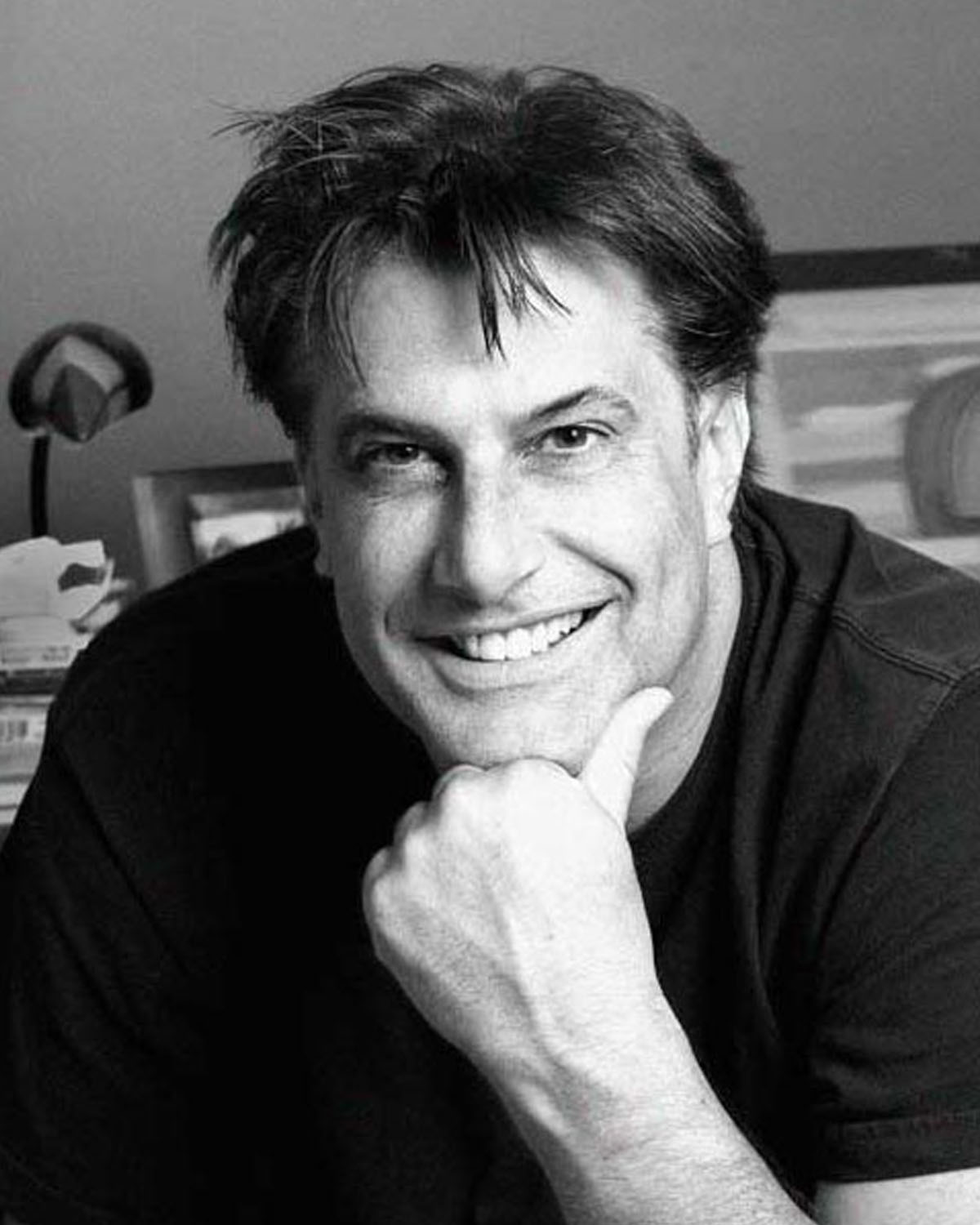
Camp Lazlo creator Joe Murray

Murray felt that Camp Lazlo successfully appealed to younger children because his prior experiences with his own children helped him determine details that children found humorous. Murray said that he resisted the urge inside of him to micromanage the production and instead approved aspects and contributions related to the show. He said that he had "a lot of pre-production time" and therefore details became established before the show aired on television. His main philosophies expressed in the show include the phrase "be who you are" and that one should question authority unless the issue is "a safety issue". Murray said that he avoids sending "messages" to children and that he hoped that his television show did not contain "too many messages".

Murray asked many staff members who participated in creating Rocko's Modern Life to return and perform duties for Camp Lazlo, describing his main tactic to attract the crew as "coercion". Murray wanted the Rocko's Modern Life crew as it "knows my sensibilities" and gained ten years of experience. Crew members of Rocko's Modern Life, such as Robert Scull or Peter Burns, have worked on this show. While Kaz was storyboard directing the first season in late 2004, Murray hired among others, such as comedy writer Martin Olson, who had collaborated with Murray on some of the most successful stories for Rocko's Modern Life.

=== Animation ===
Murray said that he likes storybook art and the works of Pablo Picasso and Henri Matisse; the styles influenced the visual style of Camp Lazlo. He also describes "great comic book artists" as important to himself and Mark O'Hare. The team created some backgrounds using "Acryl Gouache", a mixture of acrylic paint and gouache. Rough Draft Studios, a South Korean studio, produced the Camp Lazlo animation.

=== Voice acting ===
Murray asked Tom Kenny, who had voiced Heffer on Rocko's Modern Life, to voice characters because Murray felt that Kenny "adds writing to his roles" and "brings so much". Murray looked for "comedic timing" in his voice actors, and therefore he used many stand-up comics and sketch actors. Carlos Alazraqui, who had previously voiced Rocko and Spyro the Dragon (a role that would coincidentally be taken over by Kenny), voices Lazlo. Mr. Lawrence, who voiced Filburt, voices Edward and the Loons.

=== Music ===
The opening theme song, "Lazlo Was His Name-O", was based on the children's folk song "Bingo". It was adapted by musician/songwriter and producer Andy Paley, with Joe Murray writing new lyrics. Paley also composed the music score for the show; his score features original camp songs, bluegrass and cowboy swing. Murray explained that the team often used "strange instruments" such as washboards, and the musical saw. In addition to Paley's music score, the show also utilized many tracks from the APM Music library.

== Reception ==
Ray Richmond of The Hollywood Reporter posted his review of the series on July 7, 2005. Richmond said that his child enjoyed the show but did not ask to see it again. Richmond said that the show forms "plenty lively and a nice, safe way for a child viewer to spend a half-hour". Richmond said that the show has too much "self-consciously precious" humor; the reviewer said that the trait may not factor for children and described children as "demanding and non-discriminating at the same time".

Ginia Bellafante of The New York Times said that if she became "socio-analytical about the Lazlo enterprise", Camp Kidney appears to be a stand-in for "our culture of obsessive parenting".

Kathie Huddleston, a reporter for the Science Fiction Weekly, created a favorable review of Camp Lazlo.

The Atlanta Journal-Constitution reviewed the series and gave it an "A".

Joly Herman of Common Sense Media posted a review of the show on Go.com. Herman describes the humor used in the Camp Lazlo as making it an "unpredictable show for younger viewers". Herman gave the show two stars out of five.

=== Awards and nominations ===
Year	Award	Category	Nominee	Result
2006	Primetime Emmy Awards	Outstanding Animated Program (for Programming Less Than One Hour)	Joe Murray, Brian A. Miller, Mark O'Hare, Jennifer Pelphrey, Shareena Carlson, Merriwether Williams, Steve Little, Kazimieras G. Prapuolenis, Mike Roth, Clay Morrow, Kent Osborne, Cosmo Segurson, Brian Sheesley, Lindsey Pollard, Jon Ho Kim, Dong-kun Won, Phil Cummings and Maureen Mlynarczyk for "Hello Dolly"/"Overcooked Beans"	Nominated
2006	Pulcinella Awards	Best Animated Series for Children	Joe Murray	Won
2006	Pulcinella Awards	Best Animated Series for All Ages	Joe Murray	Won
2006	Pulcinella Awards	Best Character (Lazlo)	Joe Murray	Won
2007	Annie Awards	Best Production Design in an Animated Television Production	Sue Mondt for "Hard Days Samson"	Nominated
2007	Primetime Emmy Awards	Outstanding Animated Program (For Programming One Hour or More)	Joe Murray, Brian A. Miller, Mark O'Hare, Jennifer Pelphrey, Janet Dimon, Brian Sheesley, Won Dong Kun, Merriwether Williams, Russell Calabrese, Phil Cummings, Lindsey Pollard and Swinton O. Scott III for Where's Lazlo?	Won
2007	Primetime Emmy Awards	Outstanding Individual in Animation	Sue Mondt for "Squirrel Secrets"	Won
2008	Primetime Emmy Awards	Outstanding Short-format Animated Programs	Joe Murray, Brian A. Miller, Mark O'Hare, Jennifer Pelphrey, Janet Dimon, Brian Sheesley, Won Dong Kun, animation director; John Infantino and Piero Piluso, Merriwether Williams, Kazimieras G. Prapuolenis and Steve Little and Doug Gallery for "Lazlo's First Crush"	Won

== Other media ==
=== Digital releases ===
Camp Lazlo was released in HD remasters partially on Boomerang's streaming service in 2018, completing the HD release of the show in its entirety in June 2019. The complete series was also released on HBO Max in Latin America.

=== DVD releases ===
Prior to Camp Lazlo's premiere on Cartoon Network, a Press Kit for the show was given away as a promotional item, containing fact sheets on the show and a DVD with four episodes (2 half-hour episodes): "Gone Fishin' (Sort of) / Beans Are from Mars" and "Parasitic Pal / It's No Picnic". This release is since discontinued and is only available through a second-hand market.

On July 18, 2007, Madman Entertainment of Australia released a set of two DVDs encoded for Region 4 of season one episodes. No further information is available about a Region 1 release or additional seasons since then.

Two episodes have also appeared on Cartoon Network-themed DVDs. "Hello Dolly" appeared on the Cartoon Network Fridays – Volume 1 DVD, released on September 19, 2006. "Snow Beans", a winter-themed episode of the show, was released on the Cartoon Network Christmas: Volume Three DVD on October 3, 2006.

The special "Where's Lazlo," received a "For Your Consideration" release for its Emmy nomination containing a glowstick and a DVD containing the episode. This DVD is rare as it was only available for Emmy members, and is also only available at a second-hand market.

=== Video game ===
A video game for the Nintendo Game Boy Advance called Camp Lazlo: Leaky Lake Games was released on November 6, 2006, as a tie-in to the show. The game is published by Crave Entertainment and developed by Collision Studios. The player plays as the three main characters (Lazlo, Clam and Raj) to compete in a series of game challenges and earn merit badges in the Leaky Lake Games event. That will allow them to compete against the Squirrel Scouts in a final tournament. In the game, the player meets characters, such as Scoutmaster Lumpus, Mr. Slinkman, Edward, and others to receive hints and directions in achieving goals and completing timed mini-games.

Jack DeVries of IGN rated the game a 4.0 out of 10, criticizing the mini-games for not explaining their objectives and calling its gameplay "boring" and its audio "some of the most horrendous music ever heard on the GBA."

=== Promotion ===
Camp Lazlo characters appeared in a 2007 commercial for the international fast food restaurant chain McDonald's, which advertised various Cartoon Network characters being included as action figure toys in Happy Meals, including those from Camp Lazlo. Murray did not want the series to be used in Happy Meals; the only action he could take was refusing to appear in the television commercials. Murray stated on his website that he will not explain his opposition to Happy Meals due to his respect for the effort placed by Cartoon Network "marketing people". Murray stated that his opinions are his alone and do not reflect the opinions of Cartoon Network. He said that he appreciates Cartoon Network's "campaign for healthier eating habits for kids". "C" Raggio, a character designer, appeared in the commercials instead.

On November 14, 2007, Cartoon Network Enterprises announced a deal with KellyToyUSA to create toys based on the series that would be distributed to amusement parks in North America beginning in 2008.

=== In other series ===
Lazlo, Clam and Raj made cameo appearances during the end credits of the Codename: Kids Next Door and The Grim Adventures of Billy & Mandy crossover episode "The Grim Adventures of the KND", mixed with the characters of Evil Con Carne. Lazlo made a cameo in the MAD episode "Taking Nemo / Once Upon a Toon", as one of the cartoon characters who forgotten their identity. Lumpus and Edward briefly appeared in the Villainous episode "The Lost Cases of Elmore". Lazlo made a cameo in the OK K.O.! Let's Be Heroes episode "Crossover Nexus", as one of the cartoon characters who was turned into stones by Strike.

Lazlo and Raj both appeared in the Jellystone! special "Crisis of the Infinite Mirths".

== See also ==
- Rocko's Modern Life
- SpongeBob SquarePants
