= Mother Goose and Grimm =

American comic strip

- October 5, 2011 strip
- Author: Mike Peters
- Website: www.grimmy.com
- Current status/schedule: Running
- Launch date: October 1, 1984; 41 years ago
- Syndicate(s): Tribune Media Services (1984–2002); King Features Syndicate (2003–present)
- Genre: Humor

Mother Goose and Grimm (a.k.a. Mother Goose & Grimm), also known as Grimmy in books, is an internationally syndicated comic strip by cartoonist Mike Peters of the Dayton Daily News. It was first syndicated starting October 1, 1984, and is distributed by King Features Syndicate to 500 newspapers. Peters received the National Cartoonists Society's 1991 Reuben Award for the strip as well as a nomination for its Newspaper Comic Strip Award for 2000.

== Characters and story ==
The strip revolves around a yellow bull terrier named Grimm (aka Grimmy), owned by an anthropomorphic goose named Mother Goose, along with a dimwitted Boston terrier named Ralph and a cat named Attila. The strip is noted for its references to popular culture or recent news that are often spoofed and referenced for a certain period of time, depending on the length of the hype devoted to a certain news story or topic, e.g. Grimm's creation of a website known as "GrimmyLeaks", which was devoted to publishing rumors relating to fellow comic strip characters, in reference to the controversy surrounding the scandalous website WikiLeaks. The comic strip also makes multiple references to iconic fictional characters including Mr. Potato Head, Superman, Batman, and more, along with popular products including Amazon Kindles.

The strip also often consists of stand-alone one-panel comics that do not relate to the continuing story or characters.

The comic strip is named after the nursery rhyme collection Mother Goose and the fairytale collection Brothers Grimm.

== Other characters ==
- Ham – A pig who is Mother Goose's neighbor
- Fleas – Grimm's fleas and ticks
- Sumo – Mother Goose's sister's cat. He frequently comes to stay with Mother Goose, Grimm, Attila, and Ralph
- French poodle – A random, unnamed French poodle Grimm has a crush on
- Mailmen whom Grimm tortures
- Hiram – Mother Goose's boyfriend
- Ms. Lockjaw – owner of Grimm's obedience school
- Fritz – A dog at Grimm's obedience school
- Brax – A hipster dog that lives in a yurt

== Books ==
- Mother Goose and Grimm (1986)
- The Portable Mother Goose and Grimm (1987)
- Oh God, It's Grimm (1987)
- Steel Belted Grimm (1988)
- Four Wheel Grimmy (1989)
- Grimmy Come Home (1990)
- It's Grimmy (1990)
- Grimmy: Best in Show (1990)
- Grimmy: Pick of the Litter (1990)
- Grimmy: Night of the Living Vacuum (1991)
- Grimmy: Top Dog (1991)
- Grimmy and the Temple of Groom (1992)
- Grimmy: Bone in the U.S.A. (1992)
- Grimmy: On the Move (1992)
- Grimmy: The Postman Always Screams Twice (1996)
- Grimmy: Friends Don't Let Friends Own Cats (1996)
- Grimmy: King of the Heap (1997)
- Grimmy: Good Dog, Bad Breath (1999)
- Grimmy: Always Stop & Smell the Hydrants (1999)
- Grimmy: Cats & Pancakes Stick to the Ceiling (1999)
- Grimmy: In a Class by Himself (1999)
- Grimmy: Mailmen Can't Jump (1999)
- Grimmy: My Dad was a Boxer (1999)
- Grimmy: The Horrors of Global Worming (2000)
- Grimmy: The Revenge of Grimmzilla (2000)
- Grimmy: It's a Dog Sniff Dog World (2000)
- Revenge of the Fireplugs (2001)
- Grimmy Goes Postal (2001)
- Grimmy's Flea Circus (2001)
- Compost Happens (2001)
- Grimmy's Cat Tails (2001)
- Grimmy: One Sick Puppy (2001)
- The Ultimate Mother Goose and Grimm: 20th Anniversary Collection (2006)
- Grimmy: Can You Smell Me Now (yearbook 2005 part 1)
- Grimmy: You're Getting Warmer (yearbook 2005 part 2)
- Grimmy: See? Cats Are Light Sleepers (yearbook 2006 part 1)
- Grimmy: And They Call Us Gross (yearbook 2006 part 2)
- Grimmy: Flushed! (yearbook 2007 part 1)
- Grimmy: Sniffing (yearbook 2007 part 2)
- Grimmy: Rolled-Up Newspaper Dreams (yearbook 2008 part 1)
- Grimmy: Online News (yearbook 2008 part 2)
- Grimmy: You're Deleting My Archive (yearbook 2009 part 1)
- Grimmy: Filthy (yearbook 2009 part 2)
- Grimmy: Catatonic (yearbook 2010 part 1)
- Mother Goose and Grimm: Snow Day (yearbook 2010 part 2)

== Television show ==
CBS premiered a Saturday morning cartoon in 1991, Mother Goose and Grimm, which was renamed to Grimmy in its second and final season. The voice performers included Charlie Brill as Grimmy, Mitzi McCall as Mother Goose, and Greg Burson as Attila. The show ran for two seasons, and was later syndicated.

== Cameo appearances ==
Grimmy made a couple of appearances in the animated film Garfield Gets Real. His first appearance was in the cafeteria scene, when Odie jumps on the table that Grimmy's sitting at. His second one was when he was drinking out of the water fountain near the auditorium, in which he sees a poodle and immediately falls in love, drops the water on his head and follows the poodle. He later appeared again in another cafeteria scene in which everyone is thinking of an idea in which to bring Garfield and Odie to come back to Cartoonworld. He appeared again in the men's bathroom drinking out of the toilet, and is immediately embarrassed. This was similar to Dagwood's scene in which he is taking a bath. His final appearance was when everybody is cheering that they had brought back Garfield from the real world, in which he is in a crowd cheering. He did not appear in the sequels, Garfield's Fun Fest and Garfield's Pet Force. Grimmy also made an appearance as a pair of slippers in the Garfield and Friends segment, "The Name Game", with his ears excluded.

== General sources ==
- Strickler, Dave. Syndicated Comic Strips and Artists, 1924–1995: The Complete Index. Cambria, California: Comics Access, 1995. ISBN 0-9700077-0-1.
