= Merriwether Williams =

American television writer

Merriwether St. John Williams is an American television writer and former Nickelodeon executive whose writing credits include SpongeBob SquarePants, My Little Pony: Friendship Is Magic, Camp Lazlo, Adventure Time, and Pig Goat Banana Cricket.

== Career ==
After leaving the executive ranks at Nickelodeon, she was the head writer and wrote outlines for SpongeBob SquarePants and episodes of The Angry Beavers. In 2003, she developed and became the show-runner and head writer of the short-lived Showtime animated sitcom Free For All. In 2005, she became the head of story for Camp Lazlo at Cartoon Network.

More recently, Williams has written several episodes for Adventure Time, Littlest Pet Shop, My Little Pony: Friendship Is Magic, and Pig Goat Banana Cricket. She has also written an episode for Johnny Test and Pound Puppies. She is formerly co-producer and writer on Billy Dilley's Super-Duper Subterranean Summer.

She has also co-written the films Good Time Max, The Ape, and Fool's Gold with actor James Franco.

== Filmography ==
=== Television ===
Year	Title	Role	Notes
1996–1997	Aaahh!!! Real Monsters	Story Editor	Seasons 3–4
1996–1997	Rugrats	Story Consultant	Season 4
1997–2000	The Angry Beavers	Story Editor & Writer	
1998–2000	The Wild Thornberrys	Story Editor & Story Consultant	
1999	Fashionably L.A.	Actress	Receptionist
1999	KaBlam!	Additional Writing	Segment: Stewy the Dogboy
1999–2004	SpongeBob SquarePants	Story Editor, Writer, & Executive Story Editor, Actress, Story	
2003	Free for All	Developer, Writer, & Executive Producer	
2005–2008	Camp Lazlo	Story & Story Editor	
2010–2011	Adventure Time	Story & Story Editor	Seasons 1–2
2011	Johnny Test	Writer	Episode: "Johnny's World Record"
2011–2013	My Little Pony: Friendship Is Magic	Writer & Songwriter	Seasons 2–4
2012	Pound Puppies	Writer & Songwriter	Episode: "Salty"
2012–2014	Littlest Pet Shop	Writer: Story & Teleplay	Seasons 1–3
2013	SheZow	Writer	Episode: "SheZon's Greetings"
2015–2017	Pig Goat Banana Cricket	Writer, Story	
2017	Billy Dilley's Super-Duper Subterranean Summer	Co-producer, Writer and Story Editor	

=== Film ===
Year	Title	Role	Notes
2005	The Ape	Writer: Screenplay	
2005	Fool's Gold	Writer: Screenplay	
2007	Diggs Tailwagger	Writer	Pilot
2007	Where's Lazlo?	Story	TV movie
2007	Good Time Max	Writer	
2016	Toasty Tales	Writer & Story Editor	
