= Mike Peters (cartoonist) =

American cartoonist

- Born: October 9, 1943 (age 82); St. Louis, Missouri
- Occupation: Cartoonist
- Known for: Mother Goose and Grimm
- Mother: Charlotte Peters
- Awards: Pulitzer Prize for Editorial Cartooning, 1981; Inkpot Award, 1987; National Cartoonists Society Reuben Award, 1991

Michael Bartley Peters (born October 9, 1943) is an American Pulitzer Prize-winning editorial cartoonist and the creator of the comic strip Mother Goose and Grimm.

== Early life ==
Mike Peters was born in St. Louis, Missouri, where his mother, Charlotte Peters, was the host of one of the earliest TV talk shows, in which she interviewed film stars and politicians as early as 1949. Accompanying his mother to the studio, he met such celebrities as Bob Hope and Martin and Lewis. The show influenced Peters' own life:

My mom did more than a talk show. If you go to YouTube and put in Charlotte Peters, you can see an hour of her show. She sang, she danced, she entertained 250 audience members every day. It was a variety show, but also a talk show... My sister and I were like celebrities in town because of our mom. And during freshman year of high school, I would have girls who I didn’t even know call me and ask me to come with them to their junior or senior prom. If you’re a freshman or a sophomore, you never go to the prom, but these girls who were juniors and seniors would invite me to their prom. And of course, I would say yes. And I would go and rent a tuxedo, and I would go to their house and meet the mother and father of these girls. Then they would take me in their car, and while they were driving us to the prom, the mother would say, “Mike, did you know that Gloria plays the violin?” And I would say, “Really?” and she would say, “Yes, would you like to hear her play some time?” And I’d say, “Sure,” and she would pull a violin out from under the seat of the car and hand it to Gloria and Gloria would then proceed to play the violin for me all the way to the prom. And it happened again with a girl who played oboe. The mother pulled out the oboe and that girl, too, would play music for me all the way to the prom. And I was getting used to it. I would just sit there and enjoy the music... Not until I was 30-years-old did I realize that they were auditioning for my mom’s show. And I thought any girl, while being driven to the prom, would play music for you. And so, when I invited the first girl to come to the prom with me, and she didn’t play a musical instrument, I thought I was being dissed. I thought, "What is this? Aren’t you supposed to be playing music for me?"

Peters attended Christian Brothers College High School and Washington University, where he studied fine art, belonged to Sigma Chi and drew cartoons for the college paper, Student Life. He graduated in 1965. Peters recalled, "I knew when I was five years old that I wanted to be a cartoonist. As I grew older, I thought it was the only thing I could do."

He met his wife, Marian, while attending Washington University, and they moved to Chicago, where he worked for a year on the art staff of the Chicago Daily News. Drafted into the army, he spent two years of service as an artist for the Seventh Psychological Operations Group in Okinawa.

== Career ==
=== Editorial cartoons ===
On his return from the army, his mentor Bill Mauldin helped him get a job as editorial cartoonist for the Dayton Daily News in Dayton, Ohio. As a joke, he once stood on the building ledge outside the Daily News building for 30 minutes wearing a Superman costume so that he could make an entrance to a meeting through the window in the manner of actor George Reeves entering Perry White's office on The Adventures of Superman.

Beginning in 1981, he produced Peters Postscripts, a series of animated editorial cartoons on NBC Nightly News; it was the first time animated editorial cartoons appeared regularly on a prime-time network news program. Peters also hosted the 14-part interview series The World of Cartooning with Mike Peters for PBS. In 1998, Peters created a show segment called "Night of the Living Fred" for Fox Kids’s Horror-comedy show, Toonsylvania.

Peters's editorial stances are generally left of center.

=== Comic strip ===
In 1984, Peters launched Mother Goose and Grimm, distributed by King Features Syndicate. The strip is published in 500 newspapers, and according to King Features, it has a daily readership of 100 million. Peters' editorial cartoons and his comic strip are both distributed through King Features' DailyINK email service.

== Personal life ==
Mike and Marian Peters have three daughters and six grandchildren.

== Exhibitions ==
Beginning February 24, 2012, his strips and editorial cartoons were exhibited by the Key West Art and Historical Society at the Custom House in Key West, Florida. “This exhibit is a self-portrait of the artist,” said Claudia Pennington, the Society's executive director. “It looks into the genius of Mike Peters through his early work to the present day.”

== Awards ==
In 1981, Peters won the Pulitzer Prize for editorial cartooning. He has received recognition for Mother Goose and Grimm with the National Cartoonists Society's 1991 Reuben Award and a nomination for their Newspaper Comic Strip Award in 2000.

He has a star on the St. Louis Walk of Fame.
