= Mitzi McCall =

American actress (1930–2024)

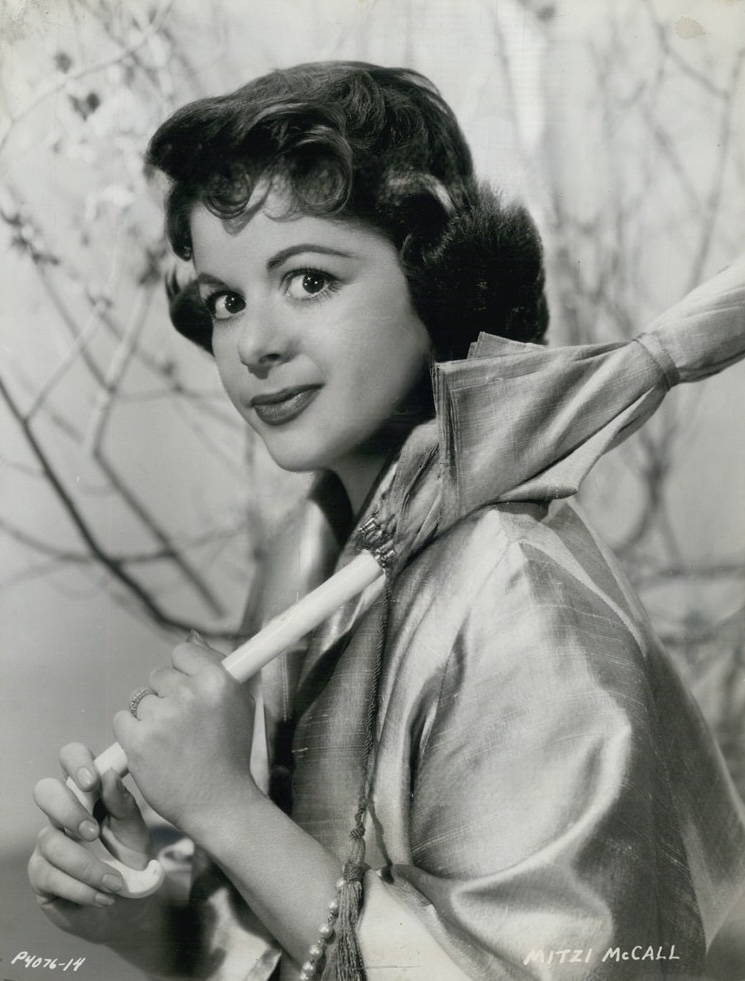
- McCall in 1955
- Born: Mitzi Joan Steiner; September 9, 1930; Pittsburgh, Pennsylvania, U.S.
- Died: August 8, 2024 (aged 93); Burbank, California, U.S.
- Occupation: Actress
- Years active: 1948–2015
- Spouse(s): Jack Tolen (divorced) Charlie Brill (m. 1960)
- Children: 1

Signature
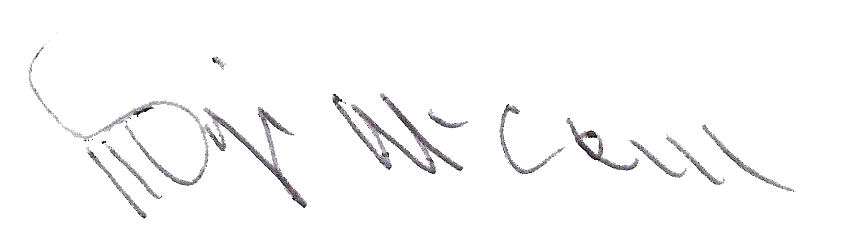

Mitzi McCall (born Mitzi Joan Steiner; September 9, 1930 – August 8, 2024) was an American comedian and actress. She was known for her work with her husband, Charlie Brill, and their performance on The Ed Sullivan Show on February 9, 1964, the same episode that featured the first appearance of The Beatles on the show.

== Early life ==
Mitzi Steiner was born in Pittsburgh, Pennsylvania, on September 9, 1930.

== Career ==
Steiner hosted the Kiddie Castle television program in Pittsburgh. She received national attention in 1952 via an Associated Press story about a five-year-old Pittsburgh girl with a cleft palate who spoke her first words while watching the actress in a pantomime on television. Afterward, doctors "didn't know what to say. They held a special meeting, examined Claire, and told the happy parents that she was cured."

In 1953, she was featured on Studio 10, a program on KFSD-TV in San Diego, California. She performed in productions at The Pittsburgh Playhouse before heading to Hollywood. Around 1955, she adopted the surname McCall to use professionally, inspired by McCall's magazine.

She appeared on Rowan & Martin's Laugh-In and was also a series regular on such television series as Life Goes On and (with her husband, Charlie Brill) on Silk Stalkings. On animated series, she provided the voice of Auntie Marina in Snorks, the voice of Mother Goose in Mother Goose and Grimm, the voice of Sylvia Jenkins in Free for All, and a variety of voices on The Paw Paws. She played Miriam Lerner on Alright Already. Other credits include guest appearances on The Twilight Zone, Maude, Dharma & Greg, and Chuck, as well as voice over work for many cartoons. In 1971, she was the voice of Penny on The Flintstones spin-off The Pebbles and Bamm-Bamm Show. She was a panelist on the game show Match Game during its 1970s revival, and appeared with Charlie Brill on Tattletales.

=== Ed Sullivan Show ===
McCall and Charlie Brill appeared on The Ed Sullivan Show on February 9, 1964, the episode that featured the U.S. television debut of The Beatles. As the last act to go on before the Beatles' second set, they performed a hastily truncated version of their full act before a studio audience of impatient Beatles fans who showed little interest in their comedy; Brill said that he and McCall "laid the biggest egg of all time". Their act can be seen on the DVD of the Beatles' appearances on the Sullivan show. They were interviewed in 2005 for the "Big Break" episode of Public Radio International radio program This American Life, regarding their Beatles-Sullivan experience, including a dressing room encounter with John Lennon, whom they did not recognize. The poor reception to their appearance derailed their career for the next six months.

In 1967, McCall and Brill had a comedy recording, From Our Point of View, released by ABC Records. Later that year, the duo signed with Congressional Records. They continued to perform until the 1980s.

=== Shawlee and McCall ===
In the early 1960s, McCall (just over 5 feet) and actress Joan Shawlee (5'9") formed a night club act, first appearing together at the Club Robaire in Cleveland. In January 1961, syndicated newspaper columnist Dorothy Kilgallen reported that the team was "causing quite a stir", emphasizing while exaggerating the partners' discrepancy in height, "Joan being six feet, three inches tall and Mitzi four feet, 10 inches short". In 2009, McCall had a supporting role as Bonnie in the film World's Greatest Dad.

== Personal life and death ==
In the early 1950s, McCall was married to Jack Tolen, a television director and production manager. She and Charlie Brill met in 1959 and married the following year. They had a daughter.

McCall died at Providence Saint Joseph Medical Center in Burbank, California, on August 8, 2024, at the age of 93.

== Filmography ==
=== Films ===
- You're Never Too Young – Skeets Powell (1955)
- Machine-Gun Kelly – Harriet (uncredited) (1958)
- War of the Satellites – Mitzi (1958)
- The Cry Baby Killer – Evelyn (1958)
- Deep Blood – Ben's Mother (1989)
- White Palace – Sophie Rosen (1990)
- The Opposite Sex and How to Live with Them – Freida Crown (1992)
- EDtv – Fig Lady (1999)
- Hard Four – Myrna Segal (2007)
- World's Greatest Dad – Bonnie (2009)
- Crimson Peak – Additional voices (2015)

=== Television series ===
- Rowan & Martin's Laugh-In – "herself" in "The Fun Couple" sketches (1968–1969)
- Maude – Estelle Ellinger (Episode: "Nostalgia Party") (1974)
- Family – Sally (Episode: "Princess in the Tower") (1978)
- Life Goes On – Midge (1991–1992)
- Silk Stalkings – Fran Lipschitz (1993–1999)
- Seinfeld – Donna (Episode: "The Secretary") (1994)
- Ellen – Rochelle Shapiro (Episode: "Too Hip for the Room") (1996)
- Alright Already – Miriam Lerner (1997–1998)
- Caroline in the City – Lois (Episode: "Caroline and the Little White Lies") (1998)
- Becker – Mrs. Gould (Episode: "Hate Thy Neighbor") (1999)
- Dharma & Greg – Florence (Episode: "With a Little Help from My Friend") (2001)
- The Suite Life of Zack and Cody – Doreen (Episode "Club Twin") (2007)
- Hannah Montana – Woman (Episode: "My Best Friend's Boyfriend") (2007)
- Chuck – Blanche (Episode: "Chuck Versus the Broken Heart") (2009)

==== Animation ====
Year	Title	Role	Notes
1971–1972	The Pebbles and Bamm-Bamm Show	Penny Pillar	16 Episodes
1972–1974	The Flintstone Comedy Hour	Penny Pillar	18 Episodes
1977–1978	Fred Flintstone and Friends	Penny Pillar	
1980	The Flintstone Comedy Show	Penny Pillar	
1980–1981	The Fonz and the Happy Days Gang	Additional Voices	
1982	The Scooby & Scrappy-Doo/Puppy Hour	Additional Voices	
1983	Lucky Luke	Ma Dalton	
1984	The New Scooby-Doo Mysteries	Additional Voices	
1984–1985	Snorks	Auntie Marina	7 Episodes
1985–1986	Paw Paws	Additional Voices	
1990	Gravedale High	Additional Voices	
1991	TaleSpin	Una	Episode: "Destiny Rides Again"
1991	Yo Yogi!	Talula LaTrane	8 Episodes
1991	Darkwing Duck	Ammonia Pine	3 Episodes
1991–1992	Mother Goose and Grimm	Mother Goose	7 Episodes
1994	Duckman	Additional voices	Episode: "Psyche"
1995	Captain Planet and the Planeteers	Mame Slaughter	Episode: "Five Ring Panda-Monium"
1997	Cow and Chicken	Receptionist	Episode: "Part Time Job"
1997	Aaahh!!! Real Monsters	Custodian Monster	1 Episode
1998	Hey Arnold!	Pearl	Episode: "Arnold's Thanksgiving"
1999	Histeria!	Golda Meir	Episode: "Histeria Around the World 2"
2000	The Wild Thornberrys	Vulture	Episode: "Gift of Gab"
2002	Ice Age	Glyptodont	Film Role
2003	Free for All	Sylvia Jenkins	7 Episodes
2006	The Grim Adventures of Billy & Mandy	Nanny	Episode: "Scary Poppins"
2008	American Dad!	Old Woman #2	Episode: "1600 Candles"
2011	Regular Show	Warden of the Internet	Episode: "Go Viral"

=== Video games ===
Year	Title	Role	Notes
2000	Clifford the Big Red Dog: Thinking Adventures	Loretta, Traffic People	
2003	Arc the Lad: Twilight of the Spirits	Geedo	
2005	Tak: The Great Juju Challenge	Thunder Fist	
2007	Spider-Man 3	Additional voices	
2007	No More Heroes	Speed Buster	
