= Camp Lazlo: Where's Lazlo? =

2007 animated television film by Joe Murray

- Created by: Joe Murray
- Written by: Joe Murray; Mark O'Hare
- Story by: Joe Murray; Mark O'Hare; Merriwether Williams
- Directed by: Joe Murray; Mark O'Hare; Brian Sheesley
- Voices of: Carlos Alazraqui; Jeff Bennett; Tom Kenny; Mr. Lawrence; Steve Little; Fred Tatasciore
- Theme music composer: Andy Paley; Joe Murray
- Opening theme: "Lazlo Was His Name-O"
- Composer: Andy Paley
- Country of origin: United States
- Original language: English

Production
- Executive producer: Joe Murray
- Producer: Janet Dimon
- Editor: Mattaniah Adams
- Running time: 46 minutes
- Production companies: Joe Murray Productions; Cartoon Network Studios

Original release
- Network: Cartoon Network
- Release: February 18, 2007

Camp Lazlo: Where's Lazlo? is a 2007 American animated television film based on the animated series Camp Lazlo. Sequentially, this movie was released during the third season of Camp Lazlo, but chronologically the events occur at the start of the series. The plot centers on how the Jelly Cabin trio met, and Lazlo's struggle to fit into the strict atmosphere of Camp Kidney.

By season three, when this movie was released, the personalities of the characters had evolved beyond the personalities of the earlier episodes, and these evolved traits were incorporated into this hour-long movie. Production order notes that this special is also the premiere of the fourth season.

== Plot ==
The story opens with Lazlo missing, and Clam and Raj relating the tale up to this point.

The first segment reveals how Raj and Clam meet. They meet a common enemy, Edward, who is the camp bully. Most of the other campers follow Edward's lead and after a scuffle, Lazlo makes his appearance. What follows builds Edward's growing resentfulness towards Lazlo, and Lumpus' dissatisfaction with the three new scouts' behavior. After choosing to name their cabin after the jelly bean, Lazlo builds a totem pole to decorate their new cabin, when Lazlo hears an animal in distress. Given Lazlo's nature, he goes to help it, while Clam and Raj choose not to accompany him.

Lazlo finds a bear with a pinecone stuck in his nose, and pulls it out, earning the bear's gratefulness. The bear, now named Fluffy, follows Lazlo home and he hides it in his cabin. When Edward tells Lumpus that Lazlo has left camp, they both attempt to confront Lazlo, but are instead met by Fluffy. Protecting Lazlo, Fluffy attacks Edward and Lumpus, scaring them out of their wits, and chases them, on the warpath against them, and the whole entire camp into Lumpus' cabin. Lazlo tells Fluffy that he's alright, and takes him to the mess hall. While everyone hides in Lumpus' cabin, Lazlo follows Fluffy out of the camp; when Lazlo's torn Bean Scout cap is later found in a gory, flesh-like mess the next day, the others assume that Lazlo was eaten by the bear.

Lazlo, Clam and Raj are together again

When Edward can find neither the bear nor Lazlo, he concocts a story about how he scared Fluffy off by his "skills" after witnessing the bear devour Lazlo, and demands the camp's respect. The next series of scenes deal with both Edward spinning a web of lies, and Lumpus trying to come to grips with Lazlo's disappearance, but only due to his fear of Commander Hoo-Ha, not over any concern for the missing scouts.

Finally understanding that Edward was lying (Clam actually figuring it out, by remembering that the bear that Lazlo brought to camp was brown, when Edward mistakenly said it was black), Raj and Clam find Lazlo, alive and well, working as a waiter in the Prickly Pines restaurant, Beef Lumberjacks. Lazlo explains the incident, but is reluctant to return to Camp Kidney, as he refuses to put up with the unfair rules. Feeling Lazlo has given up on them, Clam and Raj leave, but they've unknowingly convinced Lazlo to return.

Upon Lazlo's return, he finds an anger-turned Fluffy ravaging the camp, but this time, he has two pinecones stuck in his nose. As the bear approaches a panicking Edward, who pleads for mercy (revealing his true colors as a liar), and prepares to attack him, Lazlo calls Fluffy off. When Lazlo understands the bear's situation, he tells Edward to help Fluffy by pulling the pinecones out of his nose. After Edward pulls the pinecones out, he is free to go, and then, the rest of the camp cheers. Fluffy thanks Lazlo for helping and the two share a hug, then the bear takes his departure from Camp Kidney.

As the story closes, Lazlo appears from off-scene. Seeing Lazlo, Clam and Raj are overjoyed and rush to greet him, to which he replies that he has been in the bathroom. The movie then ends with Raj explaining that he and Clam cannot stand to be away from their friend for even a minute, and Lazlo hoping that they were not recalling the story about Fluffy (again).

== Cast ==
- Carlos Alazraqui as Lazlo, Clam, Hippo
- Tom Kenny as Scoutmaster Lumpus, Slinkman, Beaver, Weasel
- Jeff Bennett as Raj, Samson, Commander Hoo-Ha, Walrus
- Mr. Lawrence as Edward, Dave, Ping Pong
- Steve Little as Chip, Skip, Louie, Larry
- Fred Tatasciore as Bear, Big Bear

== Awards ==
On September 8, 2007, Where's Lazlo? won an Emmy in the Outstanding Animated Program (for Programming One Hour or More) category.
