= Cartoons on the Bay =

International cross-media and children's television festival

Cartoons on the Bay is an international festival held in Italy dedicated to television, film and transmedia animation, organised by the public service broadcaster RAI. Its purpose is to promote the activity of authors and producers from all over the world, offering an opportunity to meet with buyers, distributors and television managers. The Pulcinella Awards are presented at the festival for excellence in animation production.

The festival has been staged in various locations, including Amalfi, Salerno, Rapallo, Santa Margherita Ligure, Portofino, Positano, Venice, Turin, L'Aquila and Pescara.
