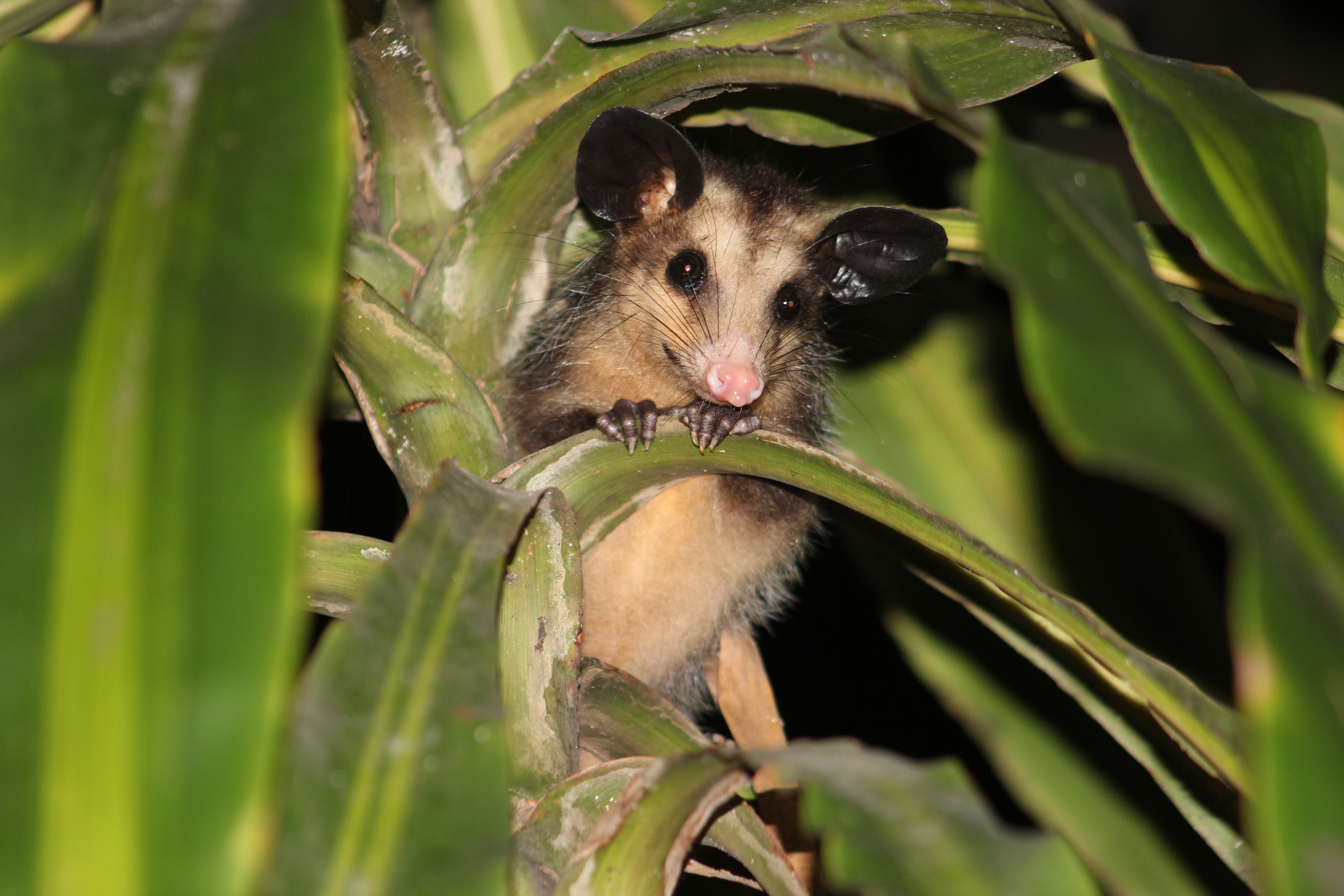

Conservation status
- Least Concern (IUCN 3.1)

Scientific classification
- Kingdom: Animalia
- Phylum: Chordata
- Class: Mammalia
- Infraclass: Marsupialia
- Order: Didelphimorphia
- Family: Didelphidae
- Genus: Didelphis
- Species: D. aurita

Binomial name
- Didelphis aurita Wied-Neuwied, 1826
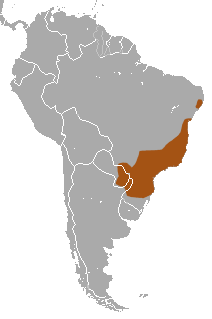
- Big-eared opossum range

Synonyms
- List: Didelphis azarae Temminck, 1824; Didelphys azarae (Temminck, 1824); Didelphys aurita Wied-Neuwied, 1826; Didelphys marsupialis aurita (Wied-Neuwied, 1825); Didelphys cancrivora Wagner, 1843; Didelphis marsupialis cancrivora (Wagner, 1843); Gamba aurita brasiliensis Liais, 1872; Didelphis koseritzi Ihering, 1892; Didelphys (Marmosa) koseriti Trouessart, 1898; Didelphis (Didelphis) leucoprymnus Matschie, 1916 nomen nudum; Didelphis aurita longipilis A. Miranda-Ribeiro, 1935; Didelphis aurita melanoidis A. Miranda-Ribeiro; Didelphis aurita longigilis Ávila-Pires, 1968

= Big-eared opossum =

Species of marsupial

The big-eared opossum (Didelphis aurita), also known as a saruê, or the gambá, is an opossum species from South America. It is found in Argentina, Brazil and Paraguay.

This species, which was considered a population of the common opossum (D. marsupialis) for some time, was originally described as D. azarae by Coenraad Jacob Temminck in 1824, but this name was incorrectly given to the white-eared opossum (D. albiventris) for over 160 years. As such, the name azarae has been abandoned.

Due to carrying offspring, female big-eared opossums tend to stay in smaller areas and reduce their movements.
