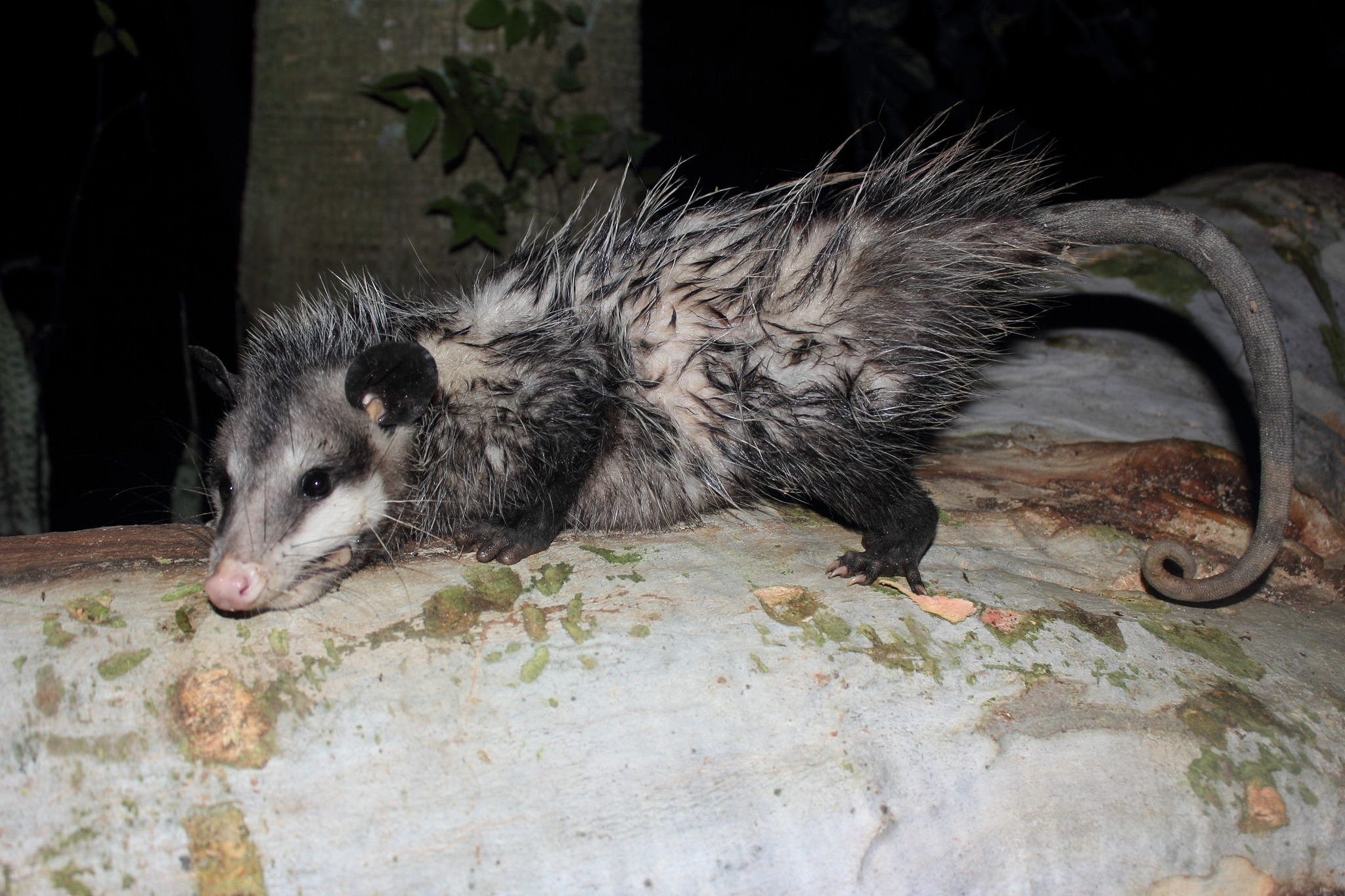

Conservation status
- Unranked (NatureServe)

Scientific classification
- Kingdom: Animalia
- Phylum: Chordata
- Class: Mammalia
- Infraclass: Marsupialia
- Order: Didelphimorphia
- Family: Didelphidae
- Genus: Didelphis
- Species: D. virginiana
- Subspecies: D. v. californica

Trinomial name
- Didelphis virginiana californica Bennett, 1833
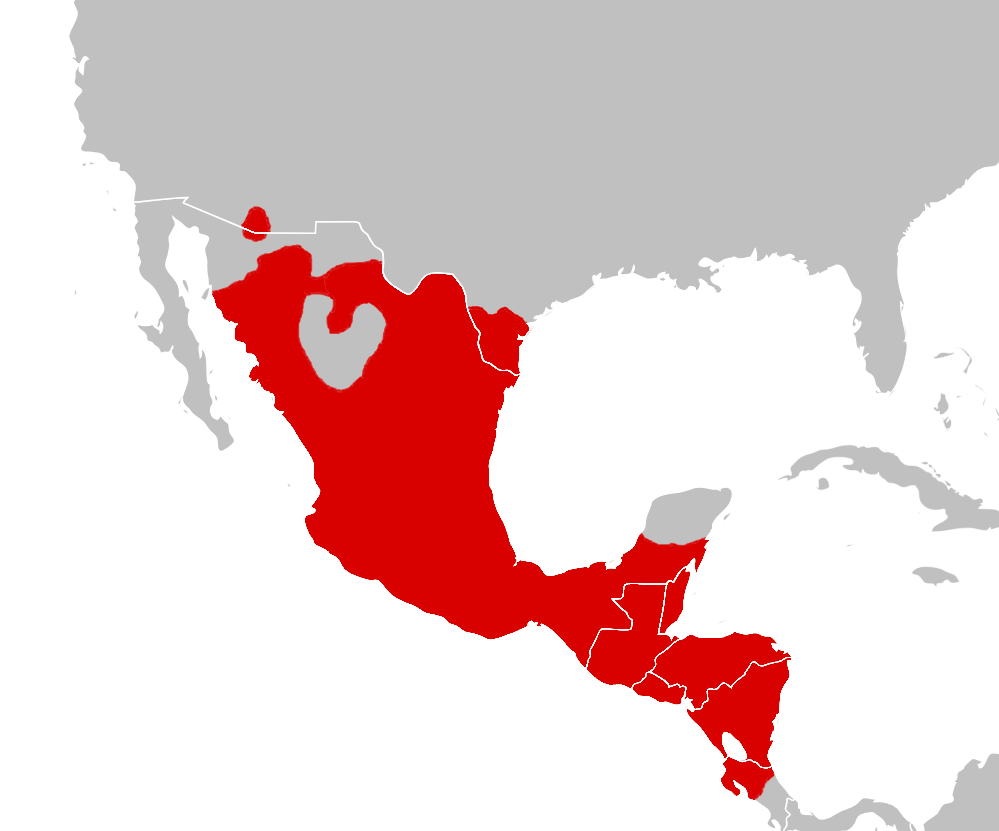
- D. v. californica range

= Didelphis virginiana californica =

Subspecies of marsupial

Didelphis virginiana californica, also known as the Mexican Virginia opossum, is a subspecies of the Virginia opossum. It is found in part of Central America, most of Mexico, and part of the United States including a large area around Tucson, Arizona.

== Identification ==
This subspecies is visually distinguishable from the nominate due to its longer tail, larger area of dark coloration at the base of its tail, darker fur, including darker legs and feet and dark stripes through its eyes. Its facial fur is also much darker, except for its white cheeks. This makes it distinguishable from D. marsupialis which has a yellowish undercoat as opposed to the white undercoat of D. v. californica.

== Behavior ==
The behavior of D. v. californica is quite similar to that of D. v. virginiana. It is a solitary, cat-sized marsupial easily recognized by its dark fur, pointed snout, small ears, and long, scaly, prehensile tail. Males tend to be larger than females. As a marsupial, it has a pouch in which it raises its young.

=== Reproduction ===
When ready for reproduction, the female opossum will release scents to attract males. The males will search for this scent and roam around making a clicking noise with their mouth to express interest. Opossums give birth to small and underdeveloped babies that are tiny, blind and hairless. After birth the babies then crawl into the mothers pouch where they latch onto one of the mothers nipples, and stay in the pouch for 25 weeks. They have a litter size of around 13. When the pouch becomes too crowded the babies will leave the pouch and ride around on the mothers back. They are weaned at around 100 days old.

== Distribution ==
D. v. californica is found throughout Mexico, excluding the Baja desert, much of the Sonoran Desert, and part of the Chihuahuan Desert. It is likely not found in most of the Yucatan Peninsula where another subspecies (D. v. yucatanensis) is native to. It is found through much of Central America, but not south of Costa Rica. Populations have been documented in southern Texas and in Tucson, Arizona, in the United States.
