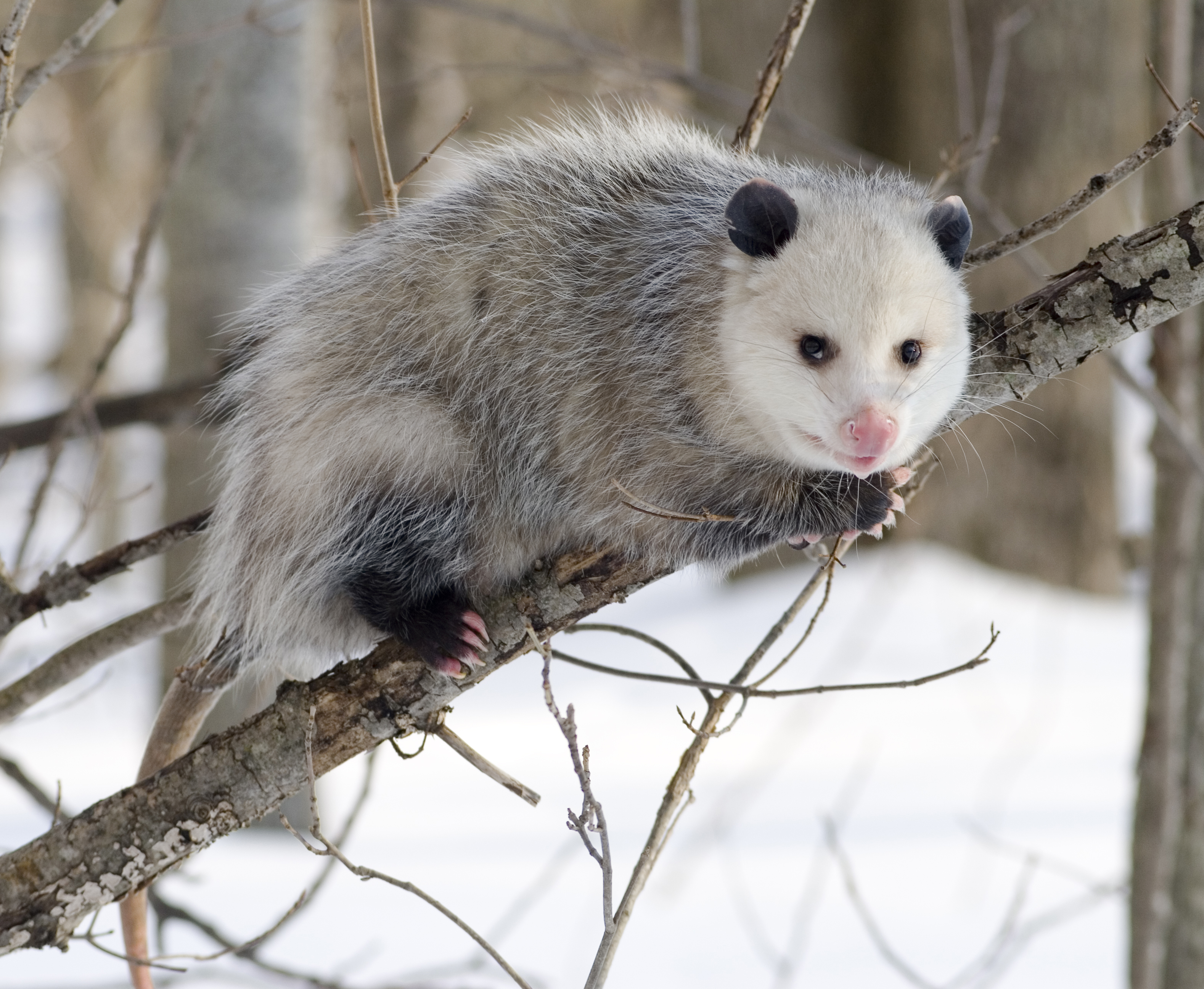
- North American opossum in winter

Conservation status
- Least Concern (IUCN 3.1)

- Secure (NatureServe)

Scientific classification
- Kingdom: Animalia
- Phylum: Chordata
- Class: Mammalia
- Infraclass: Marsupialia
- Order: Didelphimorphia
- Family: Didelphidae
- Genus: Didelphis
- Species: D. virginiana

Binomial name
- Didelphis virginiana (Kerr, 1792)
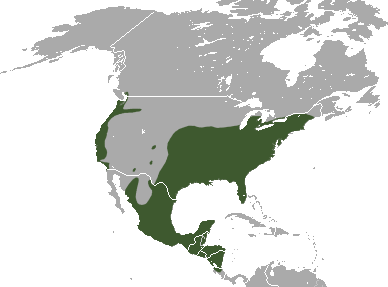
- Range of habitat, showing both historic, native range and introductions in the west; these areas are currently expanding northward (e.g., into Wisconsin and Minnesota).

Synonyms
- Didelphis marsupialis virginiana

= Virginia opossum =

Virginia opossum Temporal range: Middle Pleistocene – present (~600,000–0 YBP)

Species of North American marsupial

The Virginia opossum (Didelphis virginiana), also known as the North American opossum, is a member of the opossum family found from southern Canada to northern Costa Rica, making it the northernmost marsupial in the world. Commonly referred to simply as the possum, it is a solitary nocturnal animal about the size of a domestic cat, and a successful opportunist.

Opossums are familiar to many North Americans as they frequently inhabit settled areas near food sources like trash cans, pet food, compost piles, gardens or housemice. Their slow, nocturnal nature and their attraction to roadside carrion make opossums more likely to become roadkill than other animals in their range.

== Name ==
The Virginia opossum is the original animal named "opossum", a word that comes from the Proto-Algonquian word *wa·p-aʔθemwa ("white animal") via a descendent Powhatan word, recorded as opassom or aposoum. Colloquially, the Virginia opossum is frequently just called a "possum". The term is applied more generally to any of the other marsupials of the families Didelphidae and Caenolestidae. The generic name (Didelphis) is derived from Ancient Greek di, "two", and delphus, "womb".

The possums of Australia, whose name derives from their similarity to the American species, are also marsupials, but of the order Diprotodontia.

== Range ==
The Virginia opossum's ancestors evolved in South America, but spread into North America as part of the Great American Interchange, which occurred mainly after the formation of the Isthmus of Panama about 3 million years ago. Didelphis was apparently one of the later migrants, entering North America about 0.8 million years ago. It is now found throughout Central America and North America from Costa Rica to southern Ontario and is expanding its range northward, northwesterly and northeasterly at a significant pace.

Its pre-European settlement range was generally as far north as Maryland; southern Ohio, Indiana and Illinois; Missouri and Kansas. The clearing of dense forests in these areas and further north by settlers allowed the opossum to move northward. Elimination of the opossum's main predators in these areas also contributed to their expansion. Since 1900, it has expanded its range to include most of New England (including Maine); New York, extreme southwestern Quebec; most of southern and eastern Ontario; most of Michigan and Wisconsin; most of Minnesota, southeastern South Dakota and most of Nebraska.

Areas such as Rhode Island and Waterloo Region and Simcoe County in southern Ontario rarely had sightings of opossums in the 1960s, but now have them regularly; some speculate that this is likely due to global warming causing winters to be warmer. Some people speculate the expansion into Ontario mostly occurred by opossums accidentally being transferred across the St. Lawrence, Niagara, Detroit and St. Clair rivers by motor vehicles or trains they may have climbed upon. As the opossum is not adapted to colder winters or heavy snow, its population may be significantly reduced if a colder winter with heavier snow occurs in a particular northern region.

The Virginia opossum was not originally native to the West Coast of the United States. It was intentionally introduced into the West during the Great Depression, probably as a source of food, and now occupies much of the Pacific coast. Its range has been expanding steadily northward into British Columbia.

Small isolated populations also occur in Eastern New Mexico and parts of Southern and Central Arizona, particularly around Tucson. It is unknown if these populations are native or were introduced.

== Description ==
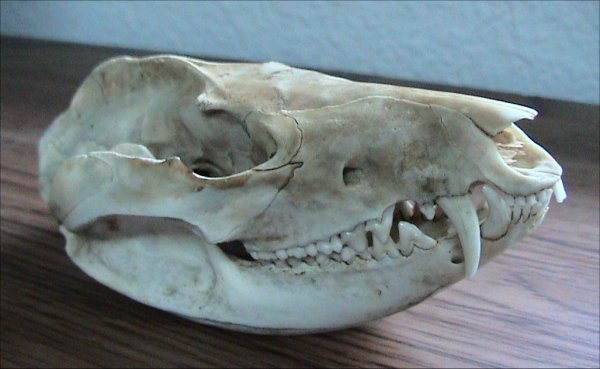
Skull of a Virginia opossum

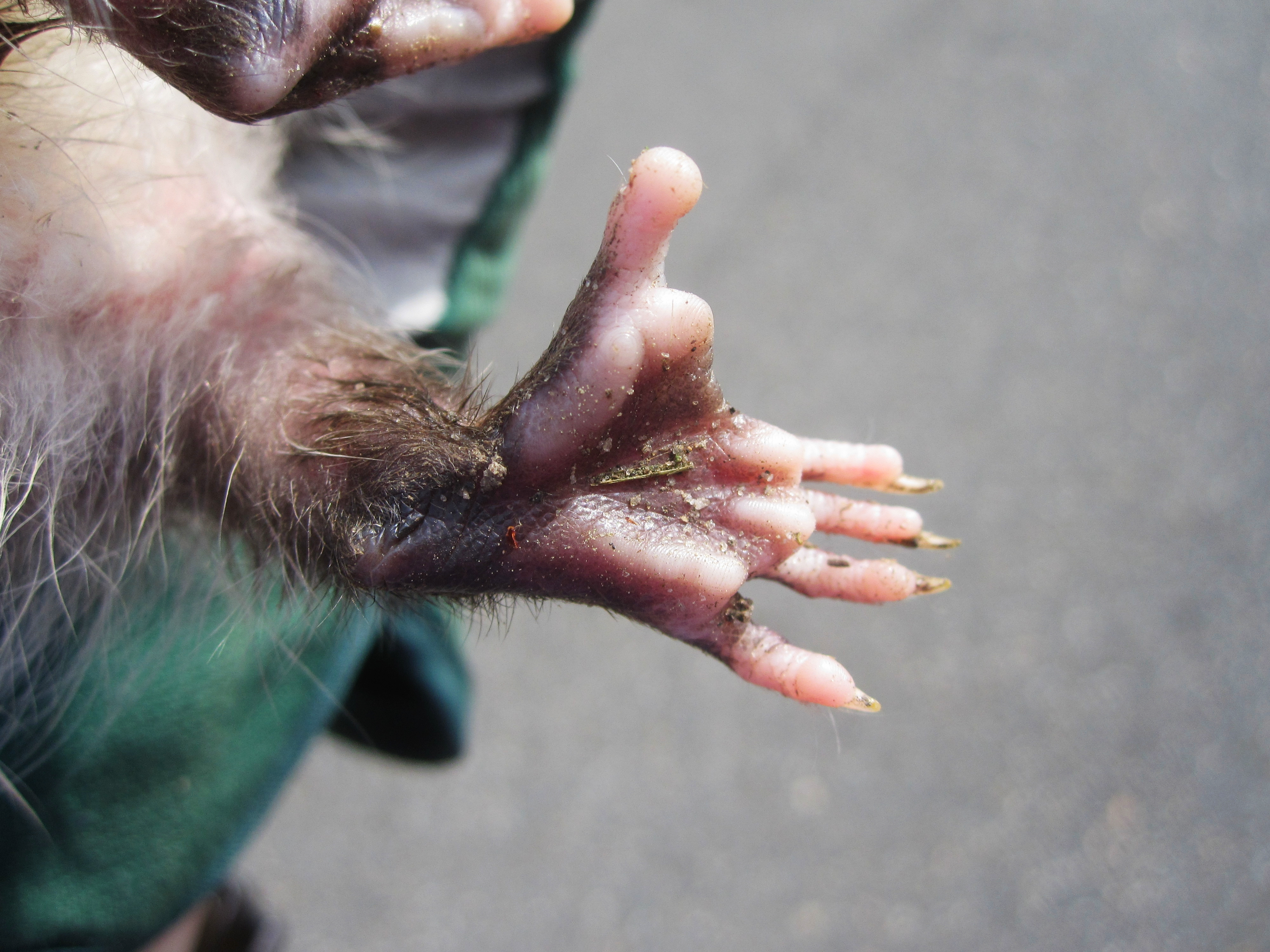
The back foot has an opposable "thumb".

Virginia opossums can vary considerably in size, with larger specimens found to the north of the opossum's range and smaller specimens in the tropics. They measure 33–55 cm (13–22 in) long from their snout to the base of the tail, with the tail adding another 25–54 cm (9.8–21.3 in). Males are slightly larger, with an average body length of 40.8 cm (16.1 in) with an average tail length of 29.4 cm (11.6 in), while females are 40.6 cm (16.0 in) long with a 28.1 cm (11.1 in) tail. Weight for males ranges from 2.1–2.8 kg (4.6–6.2 lb) and for females from 1.9–2.1 kg (4.2–4.6 lb).

Their coats are a dull grayish brown, other than on their faces, which are white. Opossums have long, hairless, prehensile tails, which can be used to grab branches and carry small objects. They also have hairless ears and a long, flat nose. Opossums have 50 teeth, more than any other North American land mammal, and opposable, clawless thumbs on their rear limbs. Opossums have 13 nipples, arranged in a circle of 12 with one in the middle.

The dental formula of an opossum is 5.1.3.44.1.3.4. No other mammal in North America has more than 6 upper incisors, while the Virginia opossum has 10.

Despite being such a widespread and successful species, the Virginia opossum has one of the lowest encephalization quotients of any marsupial. Its brain is one-fifth the size of a raccoon's.

=== Tracks ===
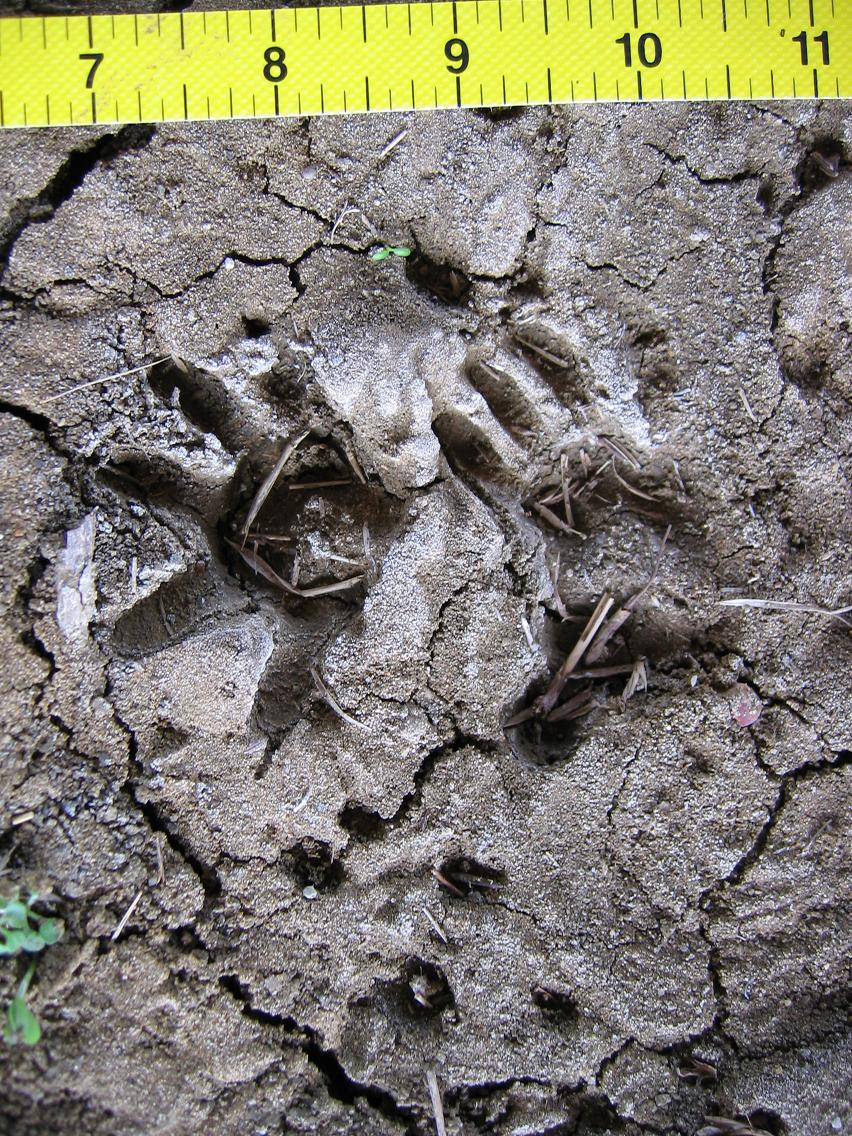
Opossum tracks (photo center) in mud: Left-fore print appears on left center of photo, right-hind print appears right center. The small, circular tracks at bottom center of photo were made by a meadow vole. The yellow ruler (top) is in inches.

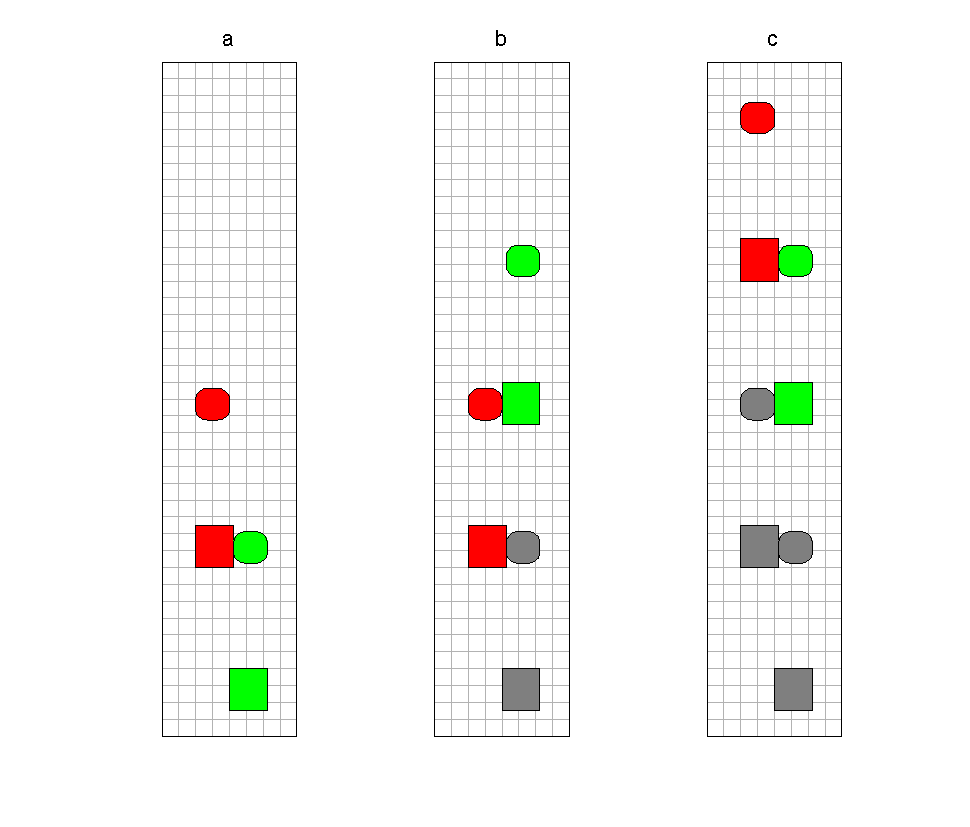
Pacing diagram for Virginia opossum - key: rectangles represent hind tracks, ellipses are fore tracks, left tracks are red, right are green. (a) the position of the four feet frozen in mid-pace. (b) the opossum brings right fore and hind feet forward. (c) the opossum brings left fore and hind feet forward. One grid square represents one square inch.

Virginia opossum tracks generally show five finger-like toes in both the fore and hind prints. The hind tracks are unusual and distinctive due to the opossum's opposable thumb, which generally prints at an angle of 90° or greater to the other fingers (sometimes near 180°). Individual adult tracks generally measure 1.9 in long by 2.0 in wide (4.8 × 5.1 cm) for the fore prints and 2.5 in long by 2.3 in wide (6.4 × 5.7 cm) for the hind prints. Opossums have claws on all fingers fore and hind except on the two thumbs (in the photograph, claw marks show as small holes just beyond the tip of each finger); these generally show in the tracks. In a soft medium, such as the mud in this photograph, the foot pads clearly show (these are the deep, darker areas where the fingers and toes meet the rest of the hand or foot, which have been filled with plant debris by wind due to the advanced age of the tracks).

The tracks in the photograph were made while the opossum was walking with its typical pacing gait. The four aligned toes on the hind print show the approximate direction of travel.

In a pacing gait, the limbs on one side of the body are moved simultaneously, just prior to moving both limbs on the other side of the body. This is illustrated in the pacing diagram, which explains why the left-fore and right-hind tracks are generally found together (and vice versa). If the opossum was not walking (perhaps running), the prints would fall in a different pattern. Other animals that generally employ a pacing gait are raccoons, bears, skunks, badgers, woodchucks, porcupines, and beavers.

When pacing, the opossum's 'stride' generally measures from 7 to 10 in, or 18 to 25 cm (in the pacing diagram the stride is 8.5 in, where one grid square is equal to 1 in^{2}). To determine the stride of a pacing gait, measure from the tip (just beyond the fingers or toes in the direction of travel, disregarding claw marks) of one set of fore/hind tracks to the tip of the next set. By taking careful stride and track-size measurements, one can usually determine what species of animal created a set of tracks, even when individual track details are vague or obscured.

== Behavior ==
=== "Playing possum" ===
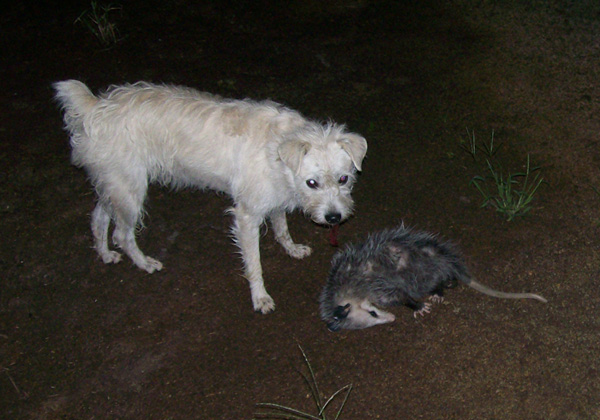
When injured or threatened (e.g., by a dog), the Virginia opossum is known to feign death or "play possum".

If threatened, an opossum will either flee or take a stand. To appear threatening, an opossum will first bare its 50 teeth, snap its jaw, hiss, drool, and stand its fur on end to look bigger. If this does not work, the Virginia opossum is noted for feigning death in response to extreme fear. This is the genesis of the term "playing possum", which means pretending to be dead or injured with intent to deceive.

In this inactive state it lies limp and motionless on its side, mouth and eyes open, tongue hanging out, and feet clenched. Fear can also cause the opossum to release a green fluid from its anus with a putrid odor that repels predators. Heart rate drops by half, and breathing rate is so slow and shallow it is hardly detectable. Death feigning normally stops when the threat withdraws, and it can last for several hours. Besides discouraging animals that eat live prey, playing possum also convinces some large animals that the opossum is no threat to their young. "Playing possum" in response to threats from oncoming traffic often results in death.

=== Diet ===
Night camera shows video of an opossum considering a bagel before walking away.

Opossums are omnivorous and eat a wide range of plant-based food, as well as animal-based food like small invertebrates, carrion, eggs, fish, amphibians, reptiles, birds, small mammals, and other small animals.

Insects such as grasshoppers, crickets, and beetles make up the bulk of the animal foods eaten by opossums. It is a common misconception that opossums eat up to 95% of the ticks they encounter and it is claimed they may eat up to 5,000 ticks per season, preventing the spread of tick-born illnesses, including Lyme disease and Rocky Mountain spotted fever. A widely publicized 2009 study by the Cary Institute theorized that Virginia opossums in a laboratory setting could eat thousands of ticks per week by grooming. However, a 2021 study of the stomach contents of wild Virginia opossums in Illinois did not find any ticks in their diet. No scientific paper as of 2023 has reported ticks in the stomach contents of Virginia opossums.

Small animals include young rabbits, meadow voles, mice, rats, birds, snakes, lizards, frogs, fish, crayfish, gastropods, and earthworms. The Virginia opossum has been found to be very resistant to snake venom,, due to unique blood proteins such as lethal toxin neutralizing factor. Attracted to carrion on the side of the highway, opossums are at an increased risk of being hit by motor vehicles.

Plant foods are mainly eaten in late summer, autumn, and early winter. These include raspberries, blackberries, apples, acorns, beechnuts, seeds, grains, bulbs, and vegetables. Persimmons are one of the opossum's favorite foods during the autumn. Opossums in urban areas scavenge from bird feeders, vegetable gardens, compost piles, garbage cans, and food dishes intended for dogs and cats.

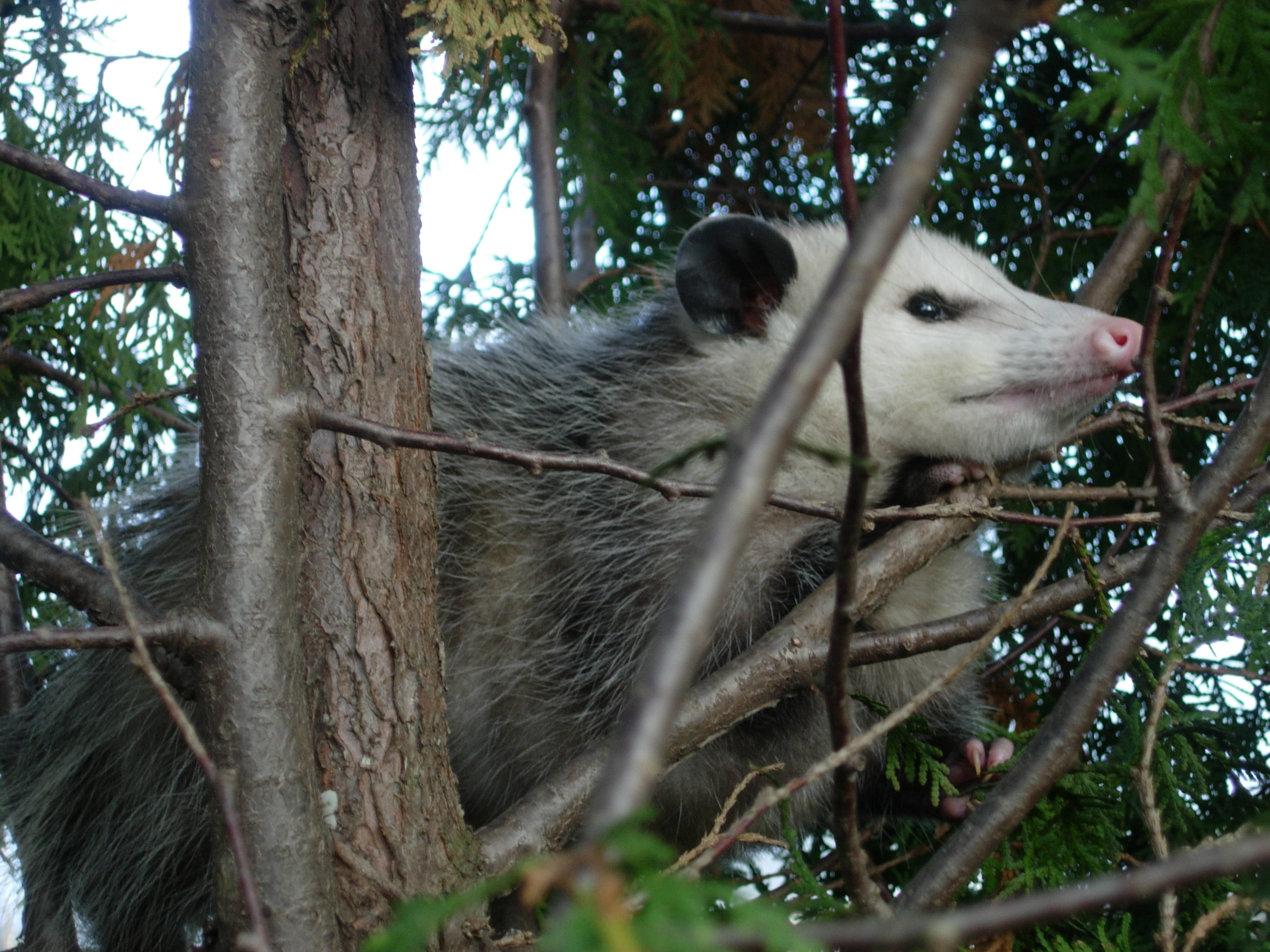
Virginia opossum in northeastern Ohio

Opossums in captivity are known to engage in cannibalism, though this is probably uncommon in the wild. Because of this, placing an injured opossum in a confined space with its healthy counterparts is inadvisable.

=== Seasonality ===
The Virginia opossum is most active during the spring and summer. It does not hibernate but reduces its activity during the winter. It may not leave its den for several days if the temperature drops below −7 to −4 °C (19 to 25 °F). Both males and females are at greater risk of injury during breeding season. Males extend their range in search of mates which puts them at greater risk of injury from motor vehicles and predators as they venture into unfamiliar territory. Females carrying young are slower moving and have to forage earlier in the evening and later into the night, also increasing their risk of injury from motor vehicles and predation.

=== Reproduction ===
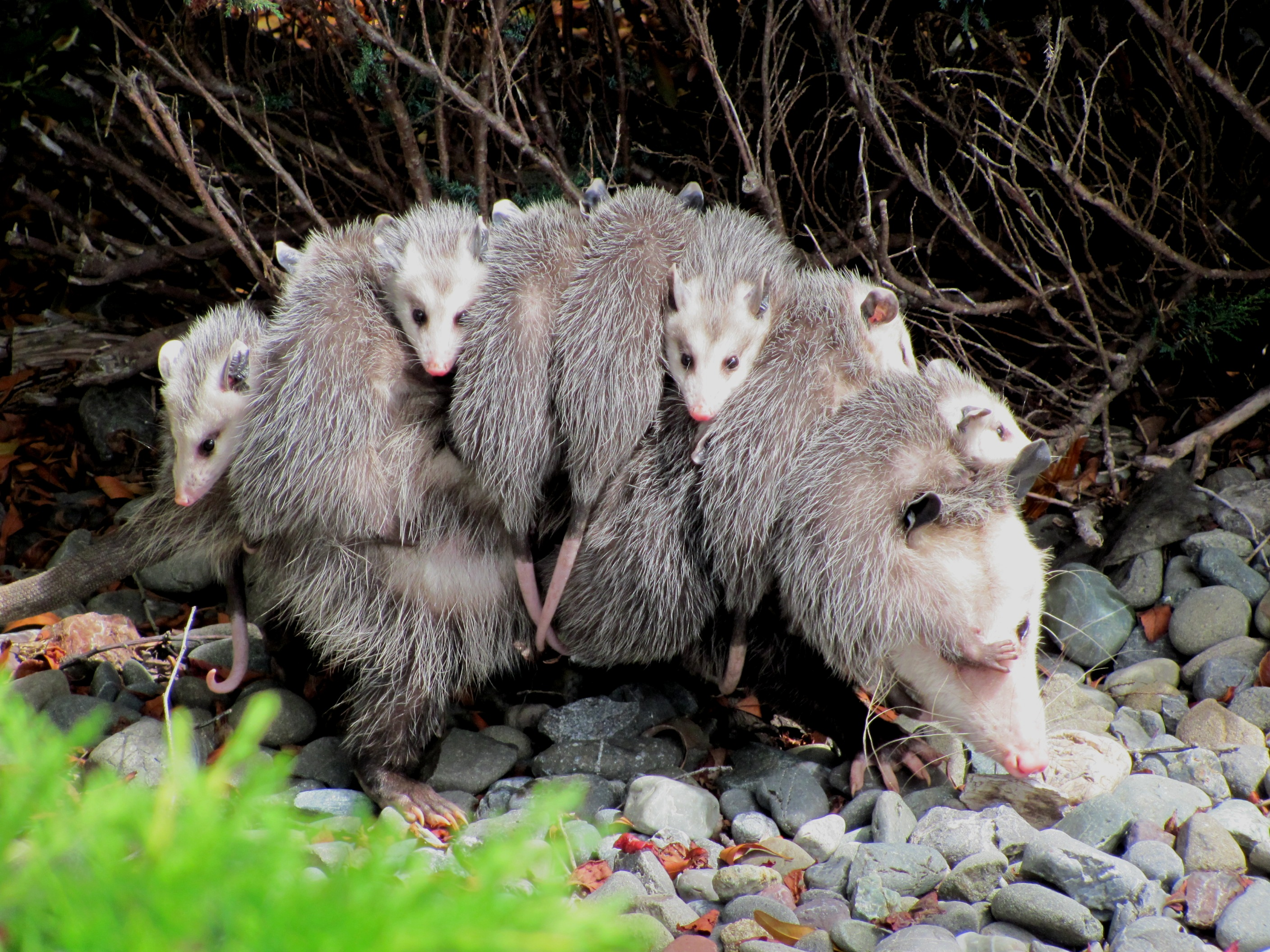
Carrying her young

The breeding season for the Virginia opossum can begin as early as December and continue through October with most young born between February and June. A female opossum may have one to three litters per year. During the mating season, the male attracts the female by making clicking sounds with his mouth. The female's estrus cycle is 28 days and lasts 36 hours. Gestation lasts 11–13 days and the average litter size is 8–9 infants, although over 20 infants may be born. Opossums have a very high mortality rate of their young; only one in ten offspring survive to reproductive adulthood.

Newborns are the size of a honeybee. Once delivered through the median vagina or central birth canal, newborn opossums climb up into the female opossum's pouch and latch onto one of her 13 teats. The young remain latched for two months and in the pouch for 2 1/2 months. The young then climb onto the mother's back, where she carries them for the remainder of their time together. It is during this time that the young learn survival skills. They leave their mother after about four or five months.

Like all female marsupials, the female's reproductive system is bifid, with two lateral vaginae, uteri, and ovaries. The male's penis is also bifid, with two heads, and as is common in New World marsupials, the sperm pair up in the testes and only separate as they come close to the egg. Males have three pairs of Cowper's glands.

== Lifespan ==
Compared to other mammals, including most other marsupials except dasyuromorphians, opossums have unusually short lifespans for their size and metabolic rate. The Virginia opossum has a maximal lifespan in the wild of only about two years. Even in captivity, opossums live only about four years. The rapid senescence of opossums is thought to reflect the fact that they have few defenses against predators; given that they would have little prospect of living very long regardless, they are not under selective pressure to develop biochemical mechanisms to enable a long lifespan. In support of this hypothesis, one population on Sapelo Island, 5 miles (8 km) off the coast of Georgia, which has been isolated for thousands of years without natural predators, was found by Dr. Steven Austad to have evolved lifespans up to 50% longer than those of mainland populations.

== Historical references ==
An early description of the opossum comes from explorer John Smith, who wrote in Map of Virginia, with a Description of the Countrey, the Commodities, People, Government and Religion in 1608 that "An Opassom hath an head like a Swine, and a taile like a Rat, and is of the bignes of a Cat. Under her belly she hath a bagge, wherein she lodgeth, carrieth, and sucketh her young." The opossum was more formally described in 1698 in a published letter entitled "Carigueya, Seu Marsupiale Americanum Masculum. Or, The Anatomy of a Male Opossum: In a Letter to Dr Edward Tyson", from Mr William Cowper, Chirurgeon, and Fellow of the Royal Society, London, by Edward Tyson, M.D. Fellow of the College of Physicians and of the Royal Society. The letter suggests even earlier descriptions.

== Relationship with humans ==
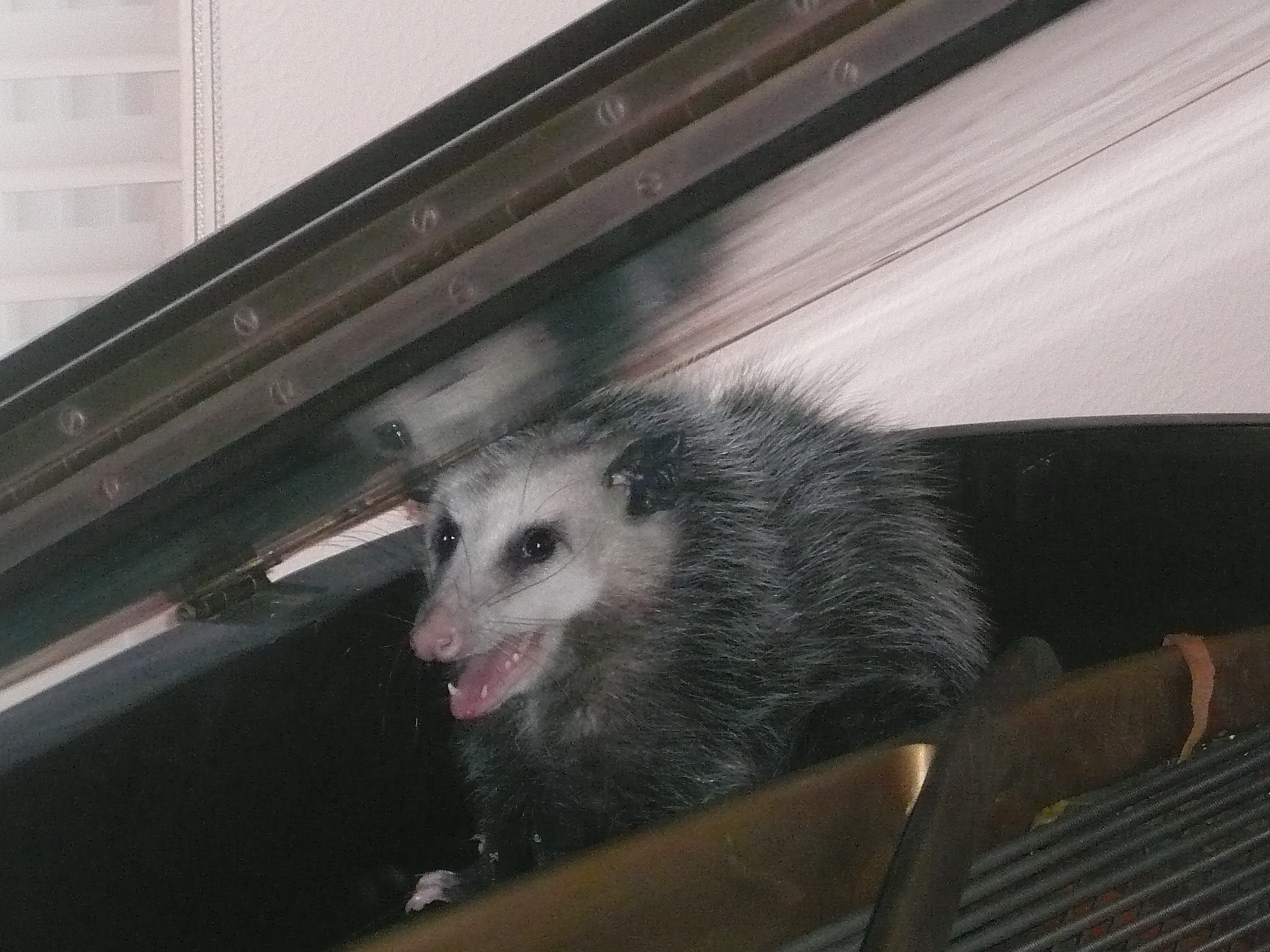
Virginia opossum cornered in a piano in Houston, Texas, shortly before its release

Opossums are not considered dangerous to humans. Though their open-mouth hiss when frightened is often mistaken as rabid behavior, opossums are naturally resistant to rabies. However, there are usually still a few cases of rabid opossums every year. Opossums can however host parasites and carry diseases such as tuberculosis, leptospirosis, and tularemia, among others.

Like raccoons, opossums can be found in urban environments, where they eat pet food, rotten fruit, and human garbage. They also are considered a common predator of poultry farming in North America. Research suggests that proximity to humans causes an increase in body size for opossums living in or near urban environments. Though sometimes mistakenly considered to be rats, opossums are not closely related to rodents or any other placental mammals.

The opossum was once a favorite game animal in the United States, particularly in the southern regions which have a large body of recipes and folklore relating to it. Their past wide consumption in regions where present is evidenced by recipes available online and in books such as older editions of The Joy of Cooking. A traditional method of preparation is baking, sometimes in a pie or pastry, though at present "possum pie" most often refers to a sweet confection containing no meat of any kind.

Around the turn of the 20th century, the opossum was the subject of numerous songs, including "Carve dat Possum", a minstrel song written in 1875 by Sam Lucas.

Although it is widely distributed in the United States, the Virginia opossum's appearance in folklore and popularity as a food item has tied it closely to the American Southeast. In animation, it is often used to depict uncivilized characters or "hillbillies". Not surprisingly, then, the Virginia opossum is featured in several episodes of the hit TV show The Beverly Hillbillies, such as the "Possum Day" episode in 1965. The title character in Walt Kelly's long-running comic strip Pogo was an opossum. In an attempt to create another icon like the teddy bear, President William Howard Taft was tied to the character Billy Possum. The character did not do well, as public perception of the opossum led to its downfall. In December 2010, a cross-eyed Virginia opossum in Germany's Leipzig Zoo named Heidi became an international celebrity. She appeared on a TV talk show to predict the 2011 Oscar winners, similar to the World Cup predictions made previously by Paul the Octopus, also in Germany.

The Perelman Building in Philadelphia, Pennsylvania, an annex of the Philadelphia Museum of Art, was formerly the Fidelity Mutual Life Insurance Company Building. Built in the late 1920s its facade is decorated with polychrome sculptures of animals symbolizing various attributes of insurance, including a possum to represent "protection".

The Virginia opossum became the official marsupial of North Carolina in 2013 and the official marsupial of New Hampshire in 2025.

== See also ==
- Didelphis virginiana californica
