= Katy the Kangaroo =

Katy the Kangaroo may refer to:

- Katy the Kangaroo, the mascot of the Austin College Kangaroos
- Katy, a kangaroo character appearing in the 1980s television show Saturday Supercade
- Katy, a kangaroo from the 1944 book Katy No-Pocket by Emmy Payne, illustrated by H. A. Rey
- Katy the Kangaroo, a puppet character created by puppeteer Ann Hogarth
- Katy the Kangaroo, a former Frosted Flakes mascot supplanted by Tony the Tiger
- Katy the Kangaroo, mascot of Riddle Airlines, former US freight airline that became Airlift International

== See also ==
- List of fictional marsupials
