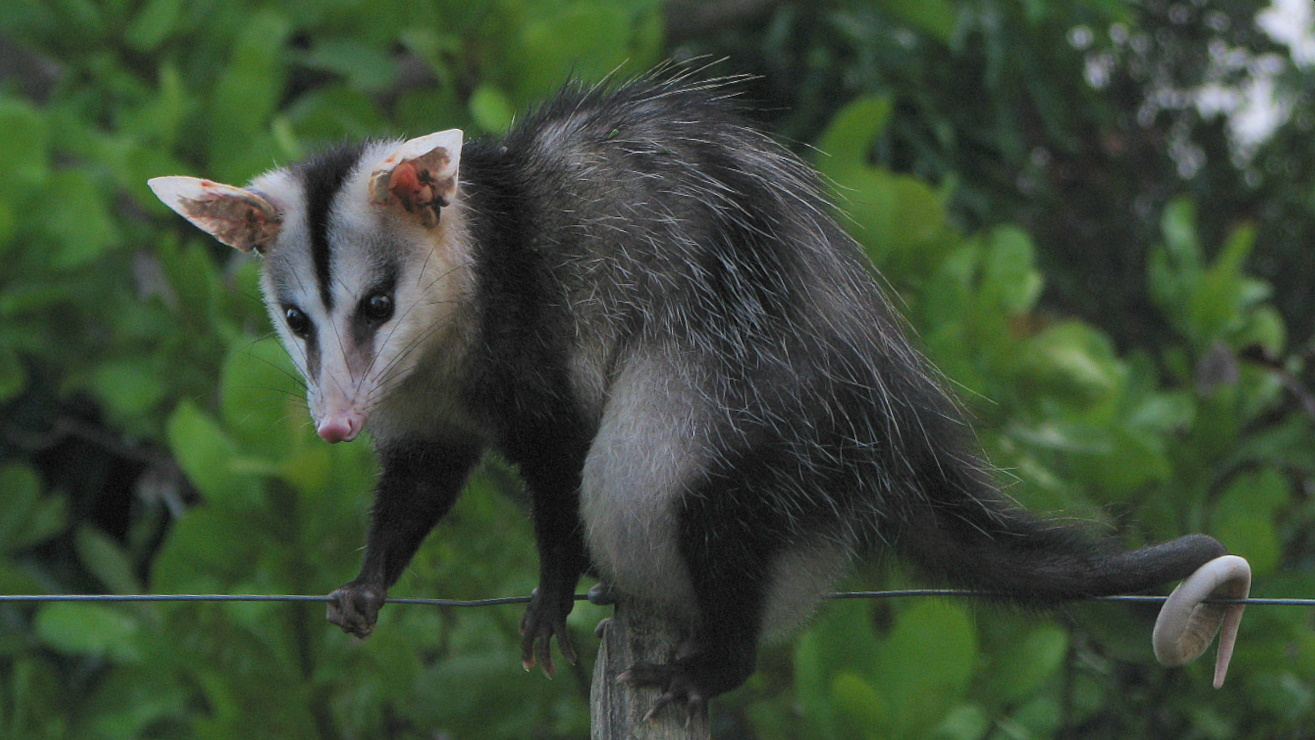

Conservation status
- Least Concern (IUCN 3.1)

Scientific classification
- Kingdom: Animalia
- Phylum: Chordata
- Class: Mammalia
- Infraclass: Marsupialia
- Order: Didelphimorphia
- Family: Didelphidae
- Genus: Didelphis
- Species: D. albiventris

Binomial name
- Didelphis albiventris Lund, 1840
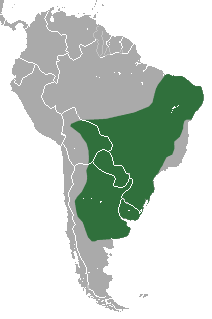
- White-eared opossum range

Synonyms
- List: Didelphis albiventris Lund, 1839 nomen nudum; Didelphis marsupialis albiventris Lund, 1839; Didelphys poecilotus Wagner, 1842; Didelphis (Didelphis) poecilotis (Wagner, 1842); Didelphys poecilonota Schinz, 1844; Didelphis azarae Tschudi, 1845; Didelphis marsupialis azarae Tschudi, 1845; Didelphys (Didelphys) marsupialis azarae Tschudi, 1845; Didelphis azarae azarae (Tschudi, 1845); Didelphys leucotis Wagner, 1847; Gamba aurita brasiliensis Liais, 1872; Didelphys azarae antiqua Ameghino; Didelphys lechei Ihering, 1892; Didelphis (Didelphis) lechei (Ihering, 1892); Didelphis paraguayensis J. A. Allen, 1902; Didelphys (Didelphys) paraguayensis (J. A. Allen, 1902); Didelphis paraguayensis bonariensis Marelli, 1930; Didelphis paraguayensis dennleri Marelli, 1930; Didelphys azarai Ringuelet, 1954; Didelphis lechii C. O. C. Vieira, 1955

= White-eared opossum =

Species of marsupial

The white-eared opossum (Didelphis albiventris), known as the timbu and cassaco in northeast Brazil, saruê and sariguê in Bahia, micurê and mucura in northern Brazil and comadreja overa and zarigüeya in Argentina, is an opossum species found in Argentina, Bolivia, Brazil, Paraguay, and Uruguay. It is a terrestrial and, sometimes, arboreal animal, and a habitat generalist, living in a wide range of different habitats.

For some time, this species was incorrectly known by the name D. azarae, correctly applied to the big-eared opossum. This led to azarae's discontinuation as a species name. From 1993 until 2002, this species also included the Guianan white-eared opossum (D. imperfecta) and the Andean white-eared opossum (D. pernigra) as subspecies.

It is the team mascot of Clube Náutico Capibaribe, a Brazilian football team from Recife, Pernambuco.

== Description ==
The white-eared opossum is about one to three pounds in weight and has black and grey fur, with white hair covering their ears and face, and dark hair on their long tails. They are omnivorous, feeding on invertebrates, small vertebrates, and fruits.

== Distribution and habitat ==
White-eared opossums inhabit open areas, mountains, and deciduous forests and are commonly found in Argentina, Paraguay, Uruguay, Bolivia, Brazil, the Andes, and humid forests of Guyana, Suriname, and southern Venezuela. These areas have disparate environmental characteristics such as rainfall, humidity, water balance and temperature.

The white-eared opossum often changes its habitat depending on its breeding season. Usually populations are higher in the wetter seasons when the young are weaned and begin venturing out for food. Though normally solitary and nomadic, some will group together in burrows, holes, empty garbage or even under houses.

== Diet and seed dispersal ==
South American opossums mainly consume invertebrates such as beetles, diplopods, and opiliones, together with fruit and vertebrates like small birds, mammals, fossorial snakes, and fish. The composition of the diet changes with the seasons and as the animal ages. During the dry season, older opossums prefer to consume vertebrates. On the other hand, the younger opossums consume more invertebrates and fruits during the wet season. These relatively small differences in diet can favour the survival of younger opossums during the wet season because they avoid competition with older animals.

The diet of white-eared opossums also makes them effective seed dispersers. Younger opossums consume smaller fruits than older opossums, so usually the adult opossums disperse larger seeds. However, proportionally, smaller seeds have more chance to pass through the gut without damage. Seeds that have commonly been associated in the diet amongst white-eared opossums are from the fruits of Morus nigra, Vassobia breviflora, Rubus rosifolius, Solanum sanctaecatharinae, and Passiflora actinia. Fecal analysis reveals that these seeds are viable for germination after the passage through the digestive tract, making the white-eared opossum an adequate vector for seed dispersal.
