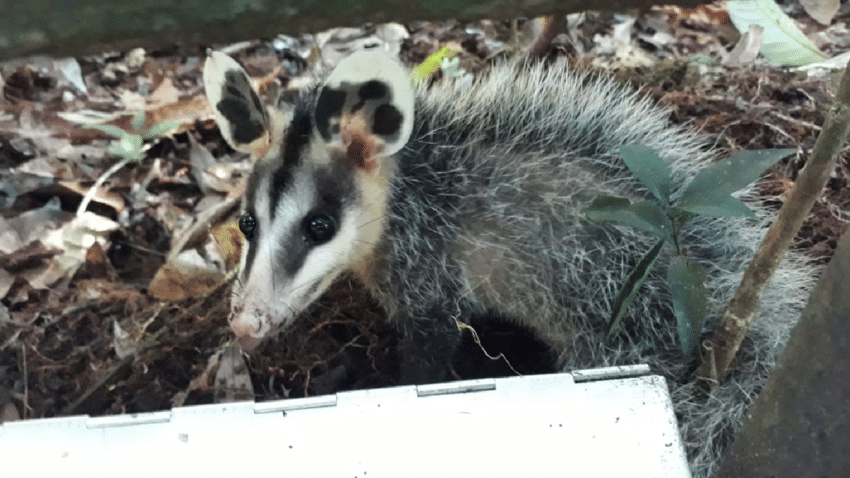

Conservation status
- Least Concern (IUCN 3.1)

Scientific classification
- Kingdom: Animalia
- Phylum: Chordata
- Class: Mammalia
- Infraclass: Marsupialia
- Order: Didelphimorphia
- Family: Didelphidae
- Genus: Didelphis
- Species: D. imperfecta

Binomial name
- Didelphis imperfecta Mondolfi & Pérez-Hernández, 1984
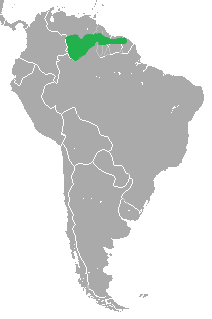
- Guianan white-eared opossum range

Synonyms
- Didelphis albiventris imperfectus Mondolfi & Pérez-Hernández, 1984

= Guianan white-eared opossum =

Species of marsupial

The Guianan white-eared opossum (Didelphis imperfecta) is an opossum species from South America. It is found in Brazil, Venezuela, Guyana, Suriname, and French Guiana.

Possessing the smallest distribution area of its genus, this species is endemic to the Guiana Shield and can inhabit elevations ranging from 80 to 2,250 meters above sea level in the region's lowland forests.

This species, together with the Andean white-eared opossum (D. pernigra), was separated from the white-eared opossum (D. albiventris) in 2002, having been included with that species in 1993.
