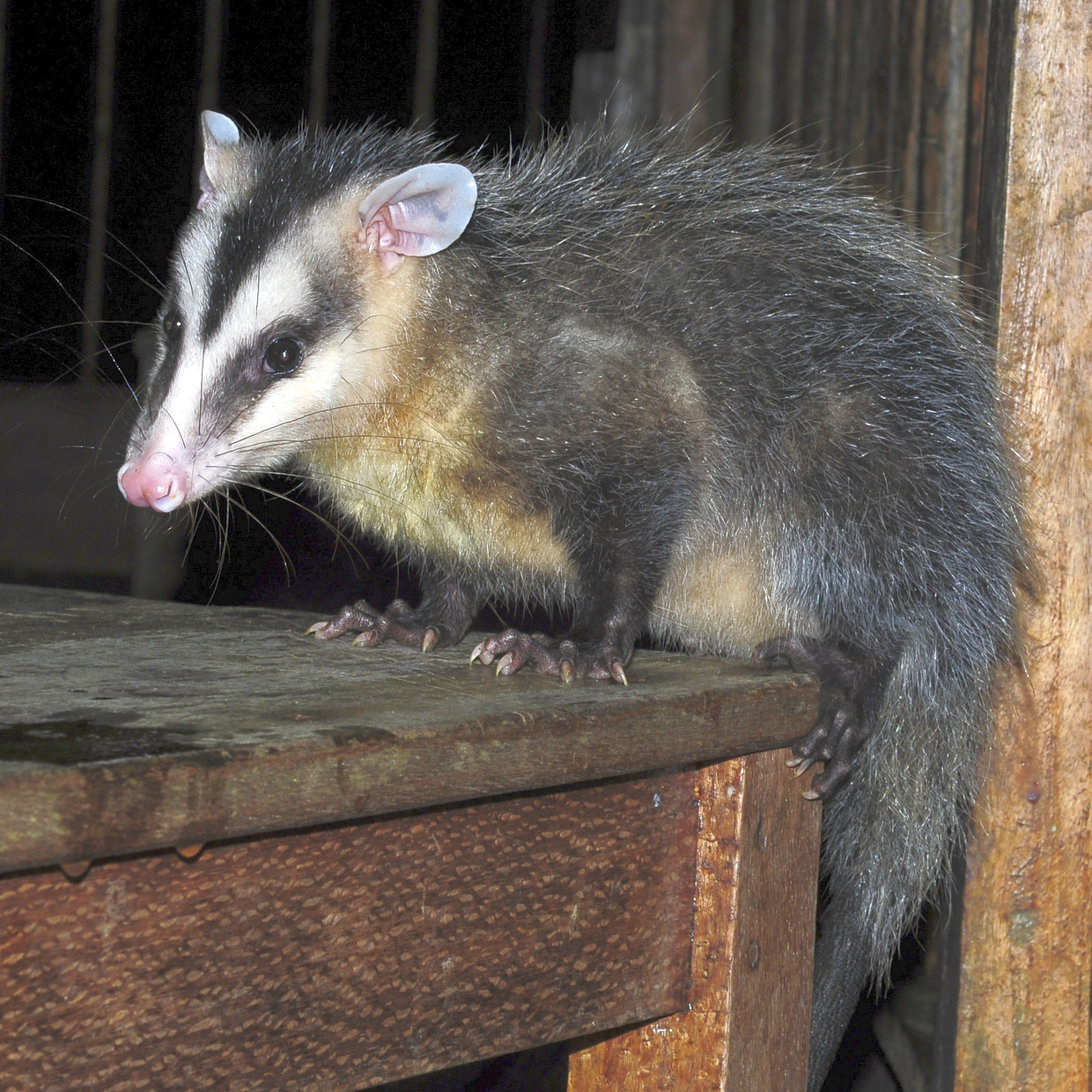

Conservation status
- Least Concern (IUCN 3.1)

Scientific classification
- Kingdom: Animalia
- Phylum: Chordata
- Class: Mammalia
- Infraclass: Marsupialia
- Order: Didelphimorphia
- Family: Didelphidae
- Genus: Didelphis
- Species: D. pernigra

Binomial name
- Didelphis pernigra J. A. Allen, 1900
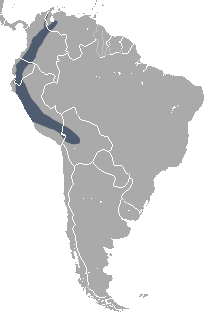
- Andean white-eared opossum range

= Andean white-eared opossum =

Species of marsupial

The Andean white-eared opossum (Didelphis pernigra) is an opossum species from South America. It is found in the Andes Mountains, ranging from Venezuela to Bolivia.

Together with the Guianan white-eared opossum (D. imperfecta), this species was separated from the white-eared opossum (D. albiventris) in 2002, having been included with that species in 1993.
