= Heidi (opossum) =

Virginia Opossum in the zoo of Leipzig, Germany

- Species: Didelphis virginiana
- Sex: Female
- Born: May 2008; North Carolina
- Died: September 2011; Leipzig Zoo
- Known for: Cross-eyed

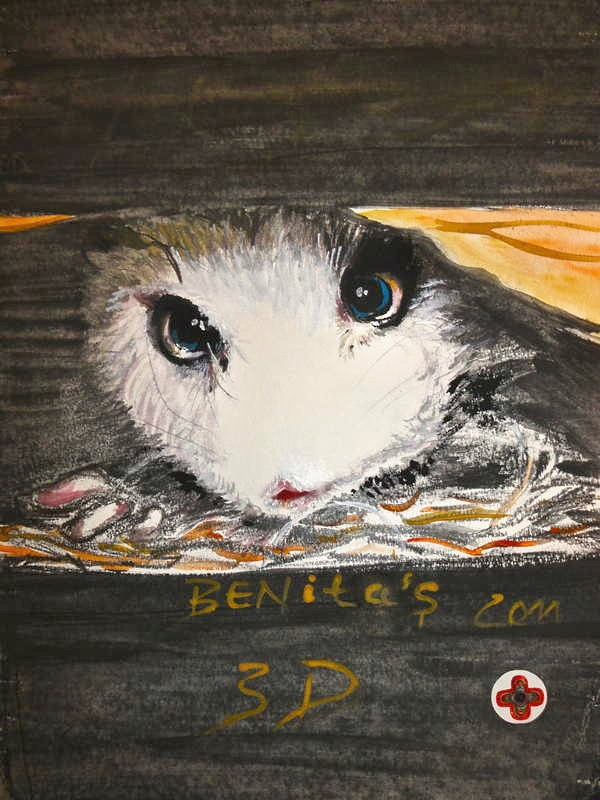
Drawing of Heidi the Opossum

Heidi (May 2008 – 28 September 2011) was a Virginia opossum housed at Germany's Leipzig Zoo. In December 2010, the two-and-a-half year old, cross-eyed animal made international headlines shortly after a photograph was published by Bild. Heidi inspired a popular YouTube song, a line of stuffed animals, and a Facebook page with over 290,000 followers.

The zoo's new tropical wildlife exhibit opened to the public in July 2011, and Heidi was exhibited alongside two other opossums – her sister Naira and a male named Teddy. International media has noted that Heidi was one of several animals either born or living in German zoos who have made headlines over the past few years; she followed in the footsteps of other German celebrity animals such as polar bears Knut and Flocke, as well as Paul the Octopus.

== Life ==
Heidi was given to Leipzig by Denmark's Odense Zoo in May 2010, although she was originally raised in a wild animal sanctuary in the U.S. state of North Carolina after being found as an orphan. It is speculated by zoo officials that Heidi's most notable attribute – her crossed eyes – may have been caused by fatty deposits behind her eyes, the result of poor diet from when she was younger. While this condition did not affect the opossum's health in any way, mainly because opossums are nocturnal, it would nonetheless have made her vulnerable to predators in the wild. The zoo put Heidi on a strict diet shortly after her arrival; it was reported in late January that she had already lost 400 grams (about one pound).

Heidi was euthanised by the zoo veterinary staff on 28 September 2011 after several weeks of struggle against arthritis and other old age health conditions. The life span of opossums in the wild is normally two years.

== Popularity ==
In December 2010, German tabloid Bild featured photographs of various animals to be featured in Leipzig Zoo's upcoming Gondwanaland exhibit. Pictures showing Heidi, the cross-eyed Virginia opossum, quickly became a phenomenon on the Internet. Although the zoo declined any plans for marketing the small marsupial, Heidi's quick rise to fame led to a popular Facebook page.

Despite the opossum's sudden fame, the Zoo had no plans to change the upcoming exhibit to better showcase its new star. Leipzig Zoo spokeswoman Maria Saegebart stated in early January: "We understand that Heidi has become so popular and that people will want to see her, but that will not change the zoo's strategy with the exhibit – she's one animal of many." Heidi reportedly received an offer to appear at the 83rd Academy Awards on 27 February 2011 via video broadcast, but instead appeared on the late-night show Jimmy Kimmel Live! in a series of pre-taped vignettes, in which she predicted the winners of three Oscar categories. She missed one prediction, choosing the long-shot Oscar-nominated 127 Hours to win over the eventual Oscar-winning The King's Speech for Best Film. A Heidi stuffed animal was included in some gift bags available to Oscar guests.
