= List of fictional marsupials =

Various notable marsupial characters appear in various works of fiction such as literature, film, television, comics, animation, and video games.

== Literature and comics ==
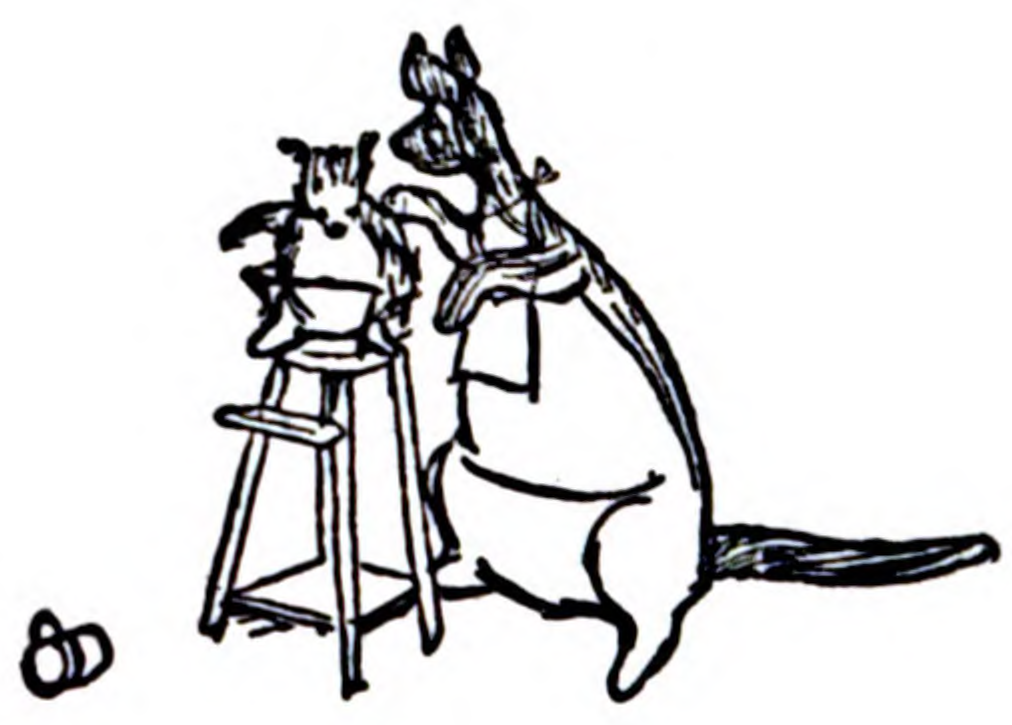
Kanga and Roo from Winnie-the-Pooh by A.A. Milne

Name	Type	Work	Author	Notes	Refs.
Blinky Bill	Koala	Blinky Bill	Dorothy Wall	A mischievous young koala from short stories in the 1930s.	
Digger	Wombat	Digger	Ursula Vernon	The titular character of her comic, an extremely down-to-earth wombat.	
Kanga and Roo	Kangaroo	Winnie-the-Pooh	A.A. Milne	A mother kangaroo and her joey.	
Kangaroo	Kangaroo	Dot and the Kangaroo	Ethel Pedley	A kangaroo who befriends a girl named Dot.	
Old Man Kangaroo	Kangaroo	The Sing-Song of Old Man Kangaroo	Rudyard Kipling	The short story concerns a vain kangaroo who asks the gods to make him unique.	
Wombat	Wombat	The Muddle-Headed Wombat	Ruth Park	A wombat known for speaking with malapropisms and spoonerisms.	

== Film and television ==
Name	Type	Work	Notes	Refs.
Blinky and Pinky	Koala	Noozles	A pair of koalas who befriend a 12-year-old girl named Sandy.	
Crash and Eddie	Opossum	Ice Age: The Meltdown	Two twin opossums who adopted Ellie when she was young.	
Hippety Hopper	Kangaroo	Looney Tunes	A young kangaroo who appeared in 14 theatrical cartoons between 1948 and 1964.	
Kiko the Kangaroo	Kangaroo	Terrytoons	A boxing kangaroo who appeared in ten cartoons made between 1936 and 1937.	
Kwicky Koala	Koala	The Kwicky Koala Show	A koala who stars in various animated shorts from Hanna-Barbera.	
Maggie Diggins	Wombat	Combat Wombat	A wombat superhero.	
Rocko	Wallaby	Rocko's Modern Life	A young anthropomorphic wallaby in a series that follows his surreal life.	
Taz	Tasmanian devil	Looney Tunes	A ferocious, albeit dim-witted, Tasmanian devil with a notoriously short temper and little patience.	

== Video games ==
Name	Type	Work	Notes	Refs.
Awesome Possum	Possum	Awesome Possum... Kicks Dr. Machino's Butt	A possum on a mission to save the world from the mad scientist Dr. Machino.	
Crash Bandicoot	Bandicoot	Crash Bandicoot	A mutant bandicoot and the enemy of Doctor Neo Cortex.	
Kao	Kangaroo	Kao the Kangaroo	A kangaroo with boxing gloves from a Polish series of platforming games.	
Ty	Thylacine	Ty the Tasmanian Tiger	A boomerang-wielding thylacine in search of mystical "Thunder Eggs".	

== Mascots ==
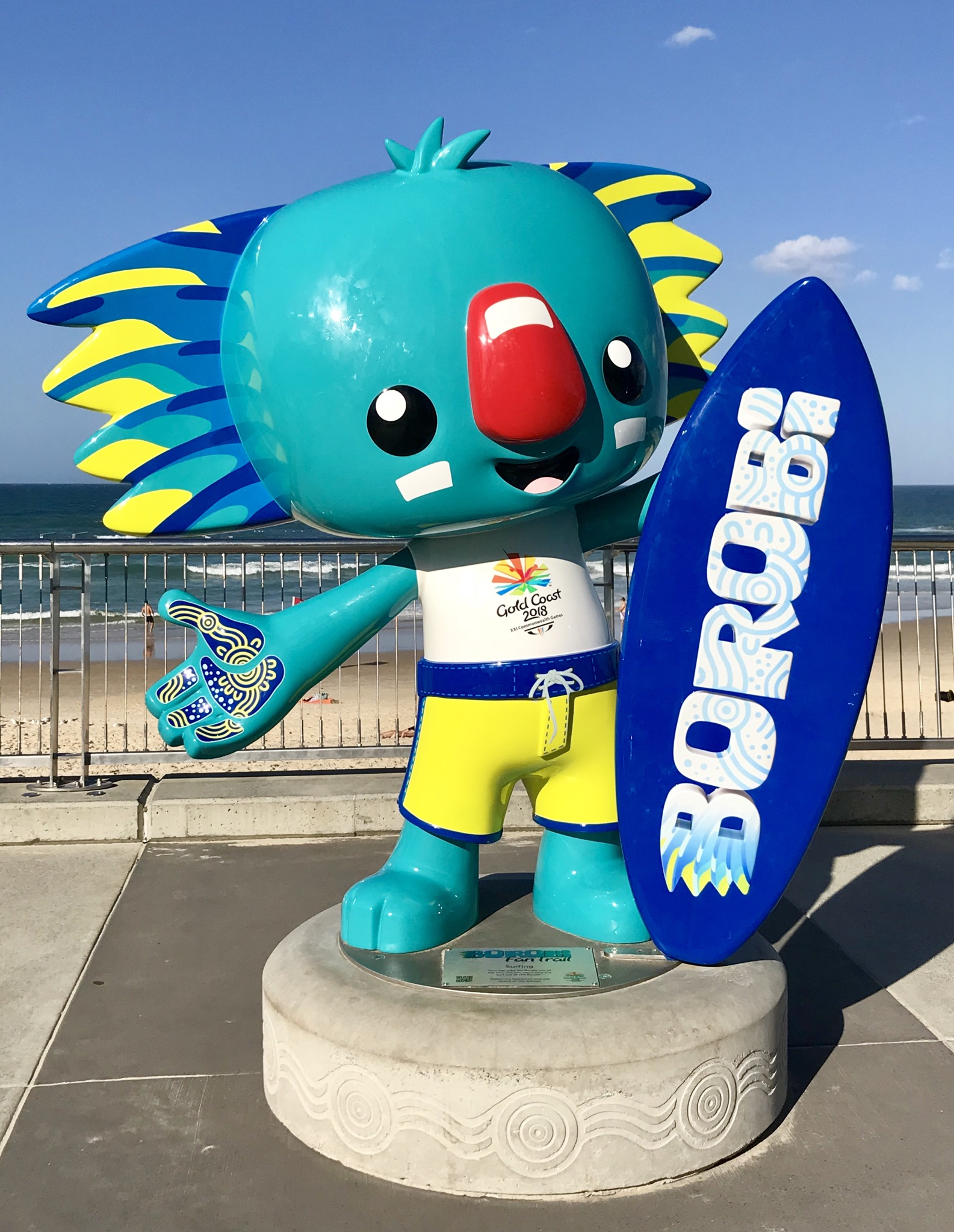
A statue of Borobi at Surfers Paradise, Queensland

Name	Type	Origin	Notes	Refs.
Billy Possum	Opossum	Lewis C. Gregg	A toy opossum made in 1909 with the aim of replacing the teddy bear.	
Borobi	Koala	2018 Commonwealth Games	A blue koala whose name is derived from the Yugambeh language.	
Boxing kangaroo	Kangaroo	Australia at the Olympics	A popular symbol of sport in Australia.	
Easter Bilby	Bilby	Billy the Aussie Easter Bilby	An Australian alternative to the Easter Bunny and chocolate bunnies.	
Fatso the Fat-Arsed Wombat	Wombat	The Dream with Roy and HG	A humorous unofficial mascot of the 2000 Summer Olympics created by Roy and HG.	
George	Koala	Caramello Koala	A koala mascot who takes the form of chocolate candies.	
Matilda	Kangaroo	1982 Commonwealth Games	A 13-meter-tall kangaroo sculpture that held children dressed as joeys inside.	
Wally	Wallaby	Australia national rugby union team	The mascot of the Australia national rugby union team.	
Zippy	Kangaroo	University of Akron	The mascot of University of Akron athletics.	
