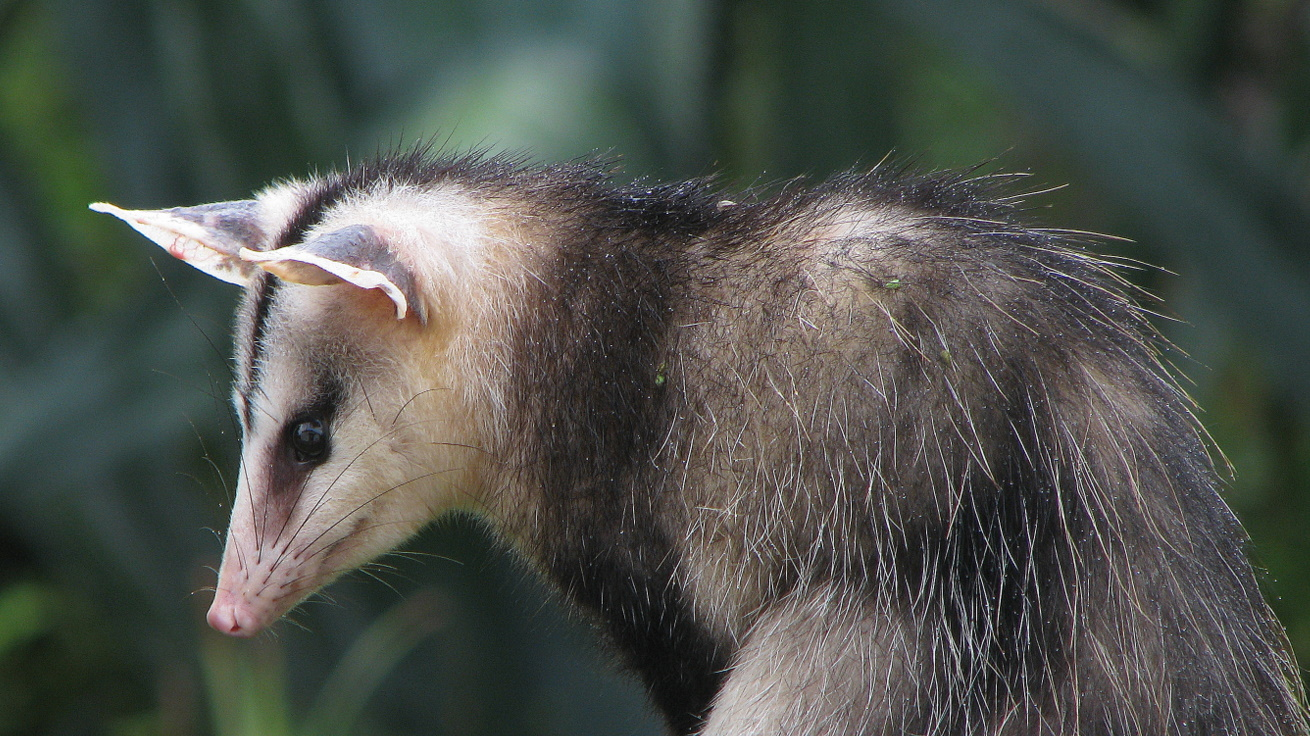
- The white-eared opossum, Didelphis albiventris, lives in South America.

Scientific classification
- Kingdom: Animalia
- Phylum: Chordata
- Class: Mammalia
- Infraclass: Marsupialia
- Order: Didelphimorphia
- Family: Didelphidae
- Subfamily: Didelphinae
- Tribe: Didelphini
- Genus: Didelphis; Linnaeus, 1758

Type species
- Didelphis marsupialis Linnaeus, 1758

Species
- Didelphis albiventris; Didelphis aurita; Didelphis imperfecta; Didelphis marsupialis; Didelphis pernigra; Didelphis virginiana; †Didelphis solimoensis (extinct)
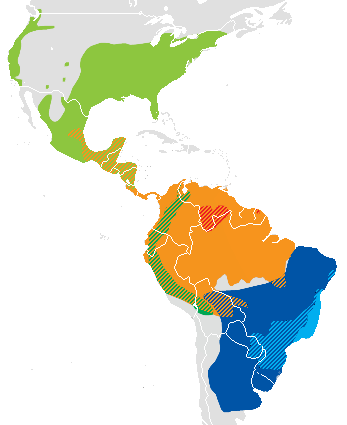

= Didelphis =

Large American opossums

Genus of marsupials

Didelphis is a genus of New World marsupials. The six species in the genus Didelphis, commonly known as Large American opossums, are members of the opossum order, Didelphimorphia.

The genus Didelphis is composed of cat-sized omnivorous species, which can be recognized by their prehensile tails and their tendency to feign death when cornered. The largest species, the Virginia opossum (Didelphis virginiana), is the only marsupial to be found north of Mexico.

The Virginia opossum has opposable toes on their two back feet.

One of the synapomorphies of this genus is the hypertrophied spinous processes of the cervical vertebrae, which also interlock. As a result, this prevents any movement of the neck. The purpose of this is not yet fully understood.

== Human interaction ==
Due to frequent interaction between human populations, Didelphis have potential risks and benefits. Disease is commonly carried amongst the species which poses threats to humans, pets, and livestock who come in contact with didelphis. A study argues otherwise however as in various regions of Brazil Didelphis marsupialis is commonly consumed for protein and its medicinal benefits used to treat disease.

== Phylogeny ==
Cladogram of living large American opossums, the genus Didelphis:

- - D. virginiana
  - - - D. aurita
      - D. marsupialis
    - - D. albiventris
      - - D. imperfecta
        - D. pernigra

=== Species ===
Skeleton of Didelphis sp., 3D model

Image	Scientific name	Distribution
	Didelphis albiventris	Argentina, Bolivia, Brazil, Paraguay, and Uruguay
	Didelphis aurita	Argentina, Brazil and Paraguay.
	Didelphis imperfecta	Brazil, Suriname, French Guiana and Venezuela.
	Didelphis marsupialis	northeast of Mexico to Bolivia to the central coast of Peru, including Trinidad and Tobago
	Didelphis pernigra	Venezuela to Bolivia
	Didelphis virginiana	Central America and North America from Costa Rica to southern Ontario
