= Billy Possum =

Stuffed toy depicting an opossum

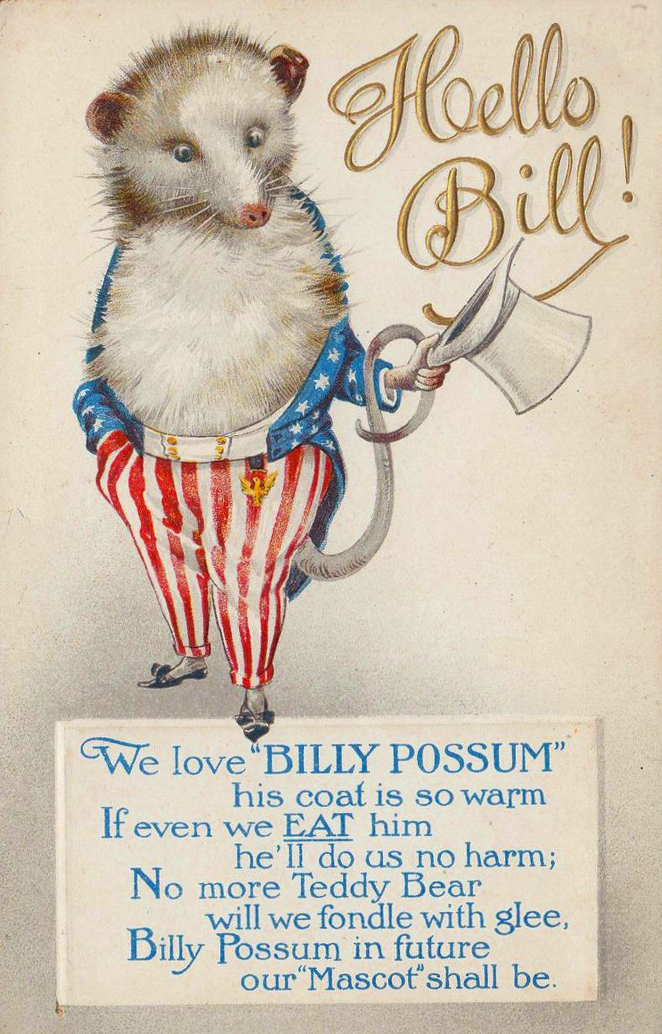
An advertisement for Billy Possum, c. 1909

Billy Possum is a type of stuffed toy depicting an opossum. Designed to be the replacement for the Teddy bear after Theodore Roosevelt vacated the office of President of the United States in 1909, the toy's popularity waned quickly, with the trend having lost all momentum by Christmas of that year.

== History ==
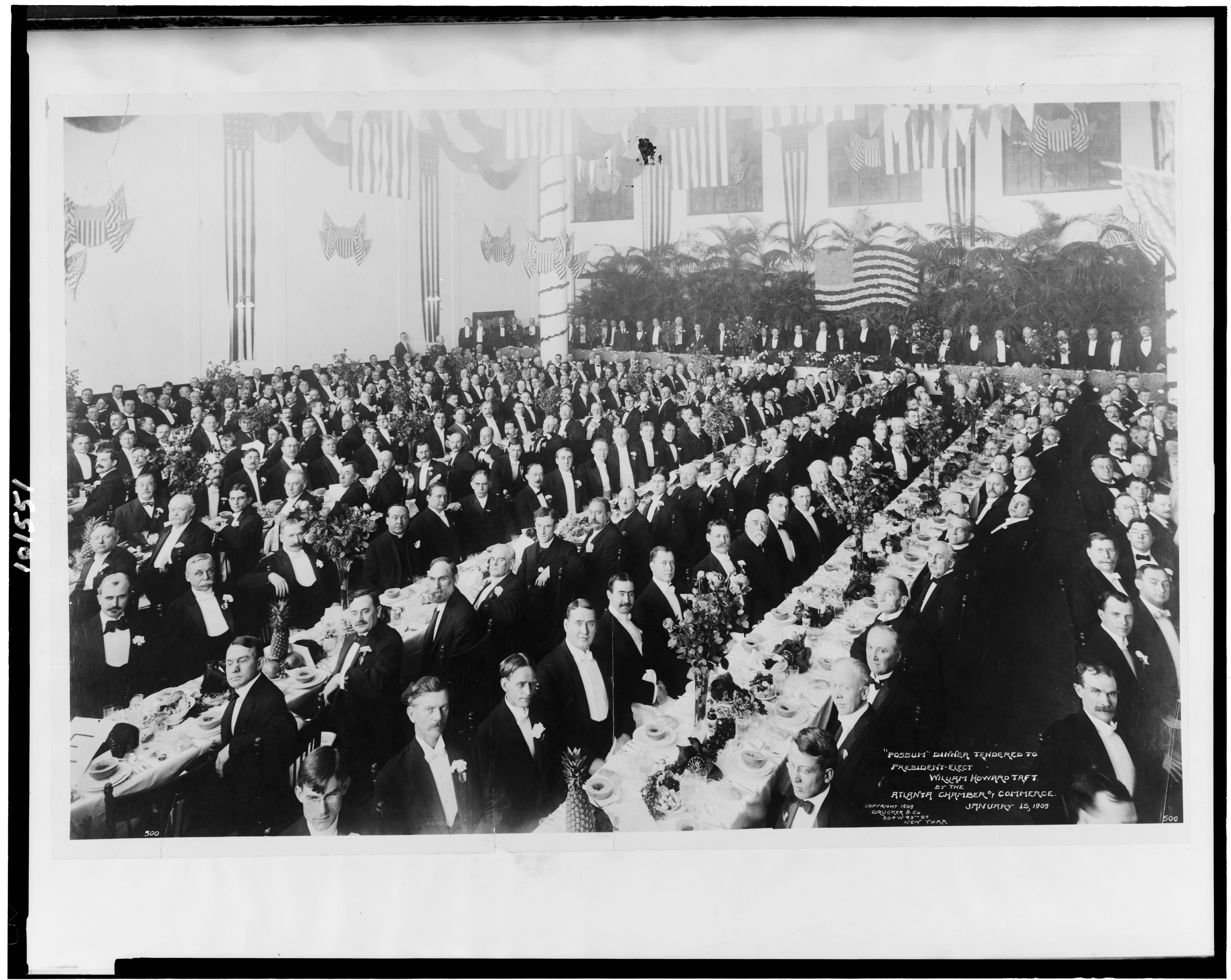
The feast in Atlanta attended by William Howard Taft on January 15, 1909, where roasted opossum was served

Created by Morris Michtom, the Teddy bear is a stuffed animal toy that was inspired by a 1902 political cartoon depicting Theodore Roosevelt refusing to shoot a bear on a hunting trip. The toy was largely successful, becoming an iconic toy. Roosevelt did not seek a third term as president, and was replaced by William Howard Taft in 1909.

Following his victory in the presidential race, Taft traveled to the state of Georgia for a vacation. He visited the city of Atlanta on January 15, where he was served persimmon beer, sweet potatoes, and an eighteen-pound roasted opossum. The dish, known as "possum-n-'taters", was popular in the Southern United States at the time, although it's unclear who suggested the dish. Some newspapers at the time reported that Taft requested the dish himself, while others suggested that it was decided by the hosts. A trade magazine for toys and games suggested that it was Asa Griggs Candler, the founder of The Coca-Cola Company, who at the time was president of the Chamber of Commerce in Atlanta. The meal was prepared and served by black servants for white attendees, as was common in wealthy southern homes at the time. The feast provided unspoken racial commentary, reassuring white attendees that Taft would not appoint black people to positions of power in the South.

Outside of this event, Taft was known to eat opossums regularly, with The New York Times once writing that they "earnestly beg Mr. Taft to stop with the 'possum". When Taft began traveling the country, people would often gift him live opossums in cages, and live opossums were mailed to the White House on multiple occasions.

Toymakers feared that with Roosevelt no longer in office, Teddy bears would cease to be popular. Cartoonist Lewis C. Gregg saw Taft's opossum feast as an opportunity to create a new presidential animal-themed toy, and presented Taft with a toy opossum called Billy Possum after he had finished his meal. The crowd present laughed at the toy for several minutes. Taft gave Gregg his blessing to use his name for the toy, and Gregg's company, the Georgia Billy Possum Company, began to produce the toys. Originally, the company intended to create toys from literal stuffed opossum skins, but the result was described as "fleshy-looking and repulsive—like a pale, limp rat", leading to the creation of the plush version instead. The company's slogan was "Good-bye, Teddy Bear. Hello, Billy Possum". In addition to plush toys, the character of Billy Possum was featured on post cards, buttons, figurines, china, puzzles, and other merchandise. Despite this, the toy failed, with the company losing popularity before the Christmas season of 1909.

The failure of Billy Possum has been attributed to the fact that the toy was the result of a manufactured trend, as well as the fact that the story behind Taft eating an opossum was less compelling than the story of Roosevelt sparing a bear.

== Legacy ==
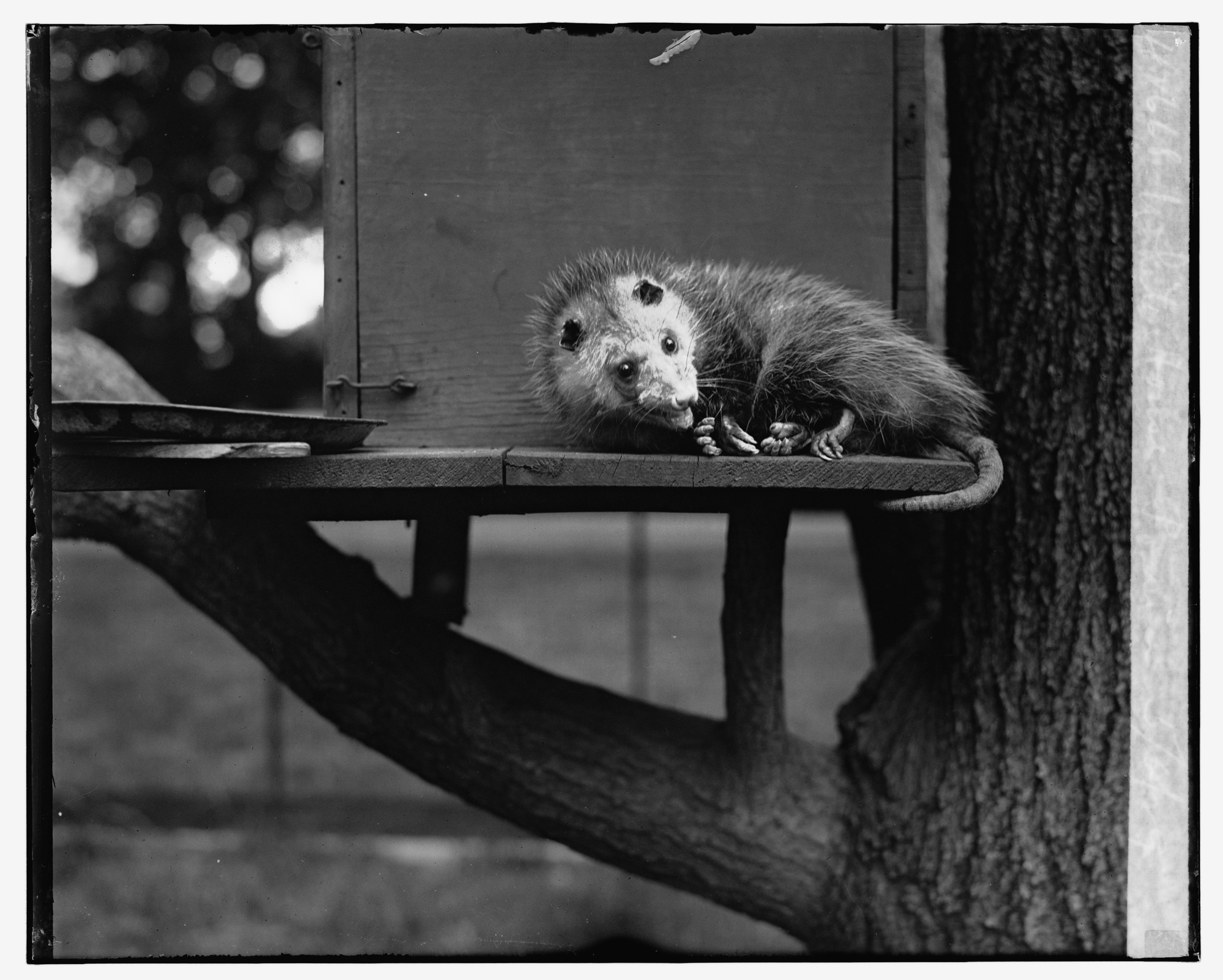
Billy Possum, Herbert Hoover's pet, photographed in 1929

President Calvin Coolidge had a cage built on the grounds of the White House for his pet raccoon, Rebecca. After Coolidge left office and Herbert Hoover took his place, a wild opossum began to live in Rebecca's former cage. Hoover named the opossum Billy Possum in reference to Taft. Hoover's Billy Possum temporarily became the mascot of a baseball team in Hyattsville, Maryland after the team lost their own opossum.
