= Emmanuel Liais =

French-Brazilian astronomer, botanist and explorer

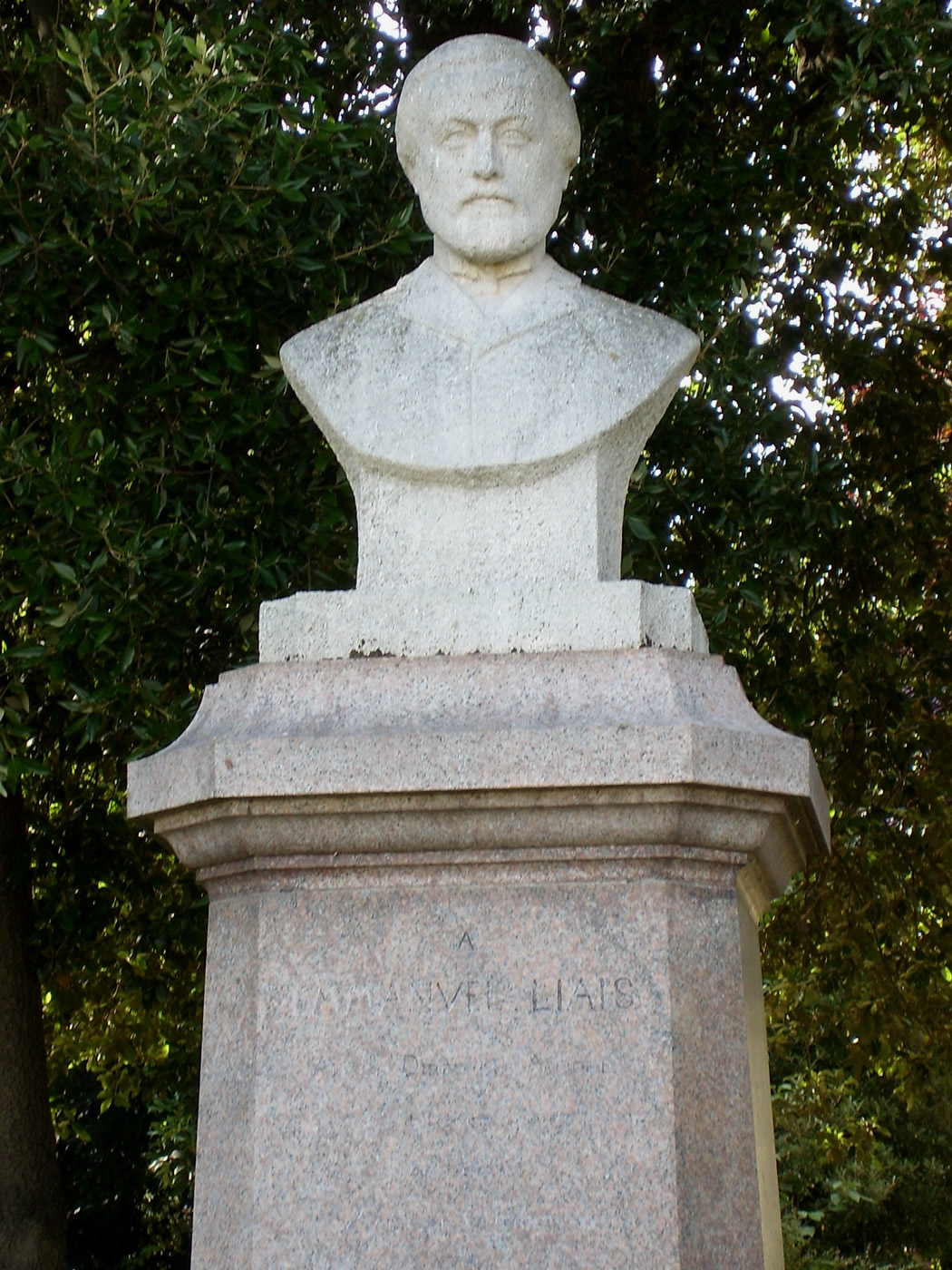
- A statue of Emmanuel Liais in Cherbourg, France
- Born: 15 February 1826; Cherbourg
- Died: 5 March 1900 (aged 74); Cherbourg
- Occupation: Astronomer, explorer, botanist, geographer

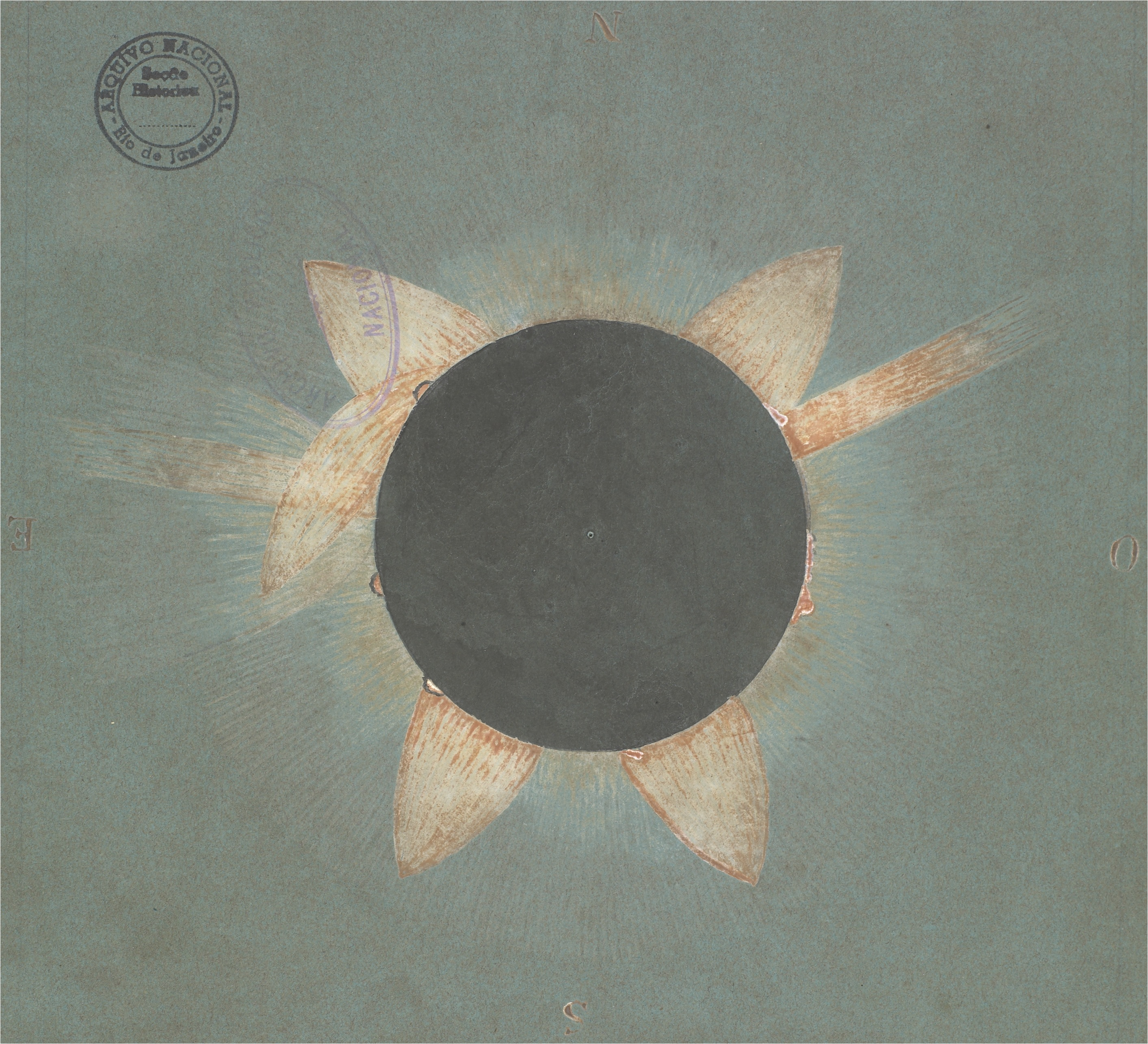
Liais observed the solar eclipse of September 7, 1858 from Brazil

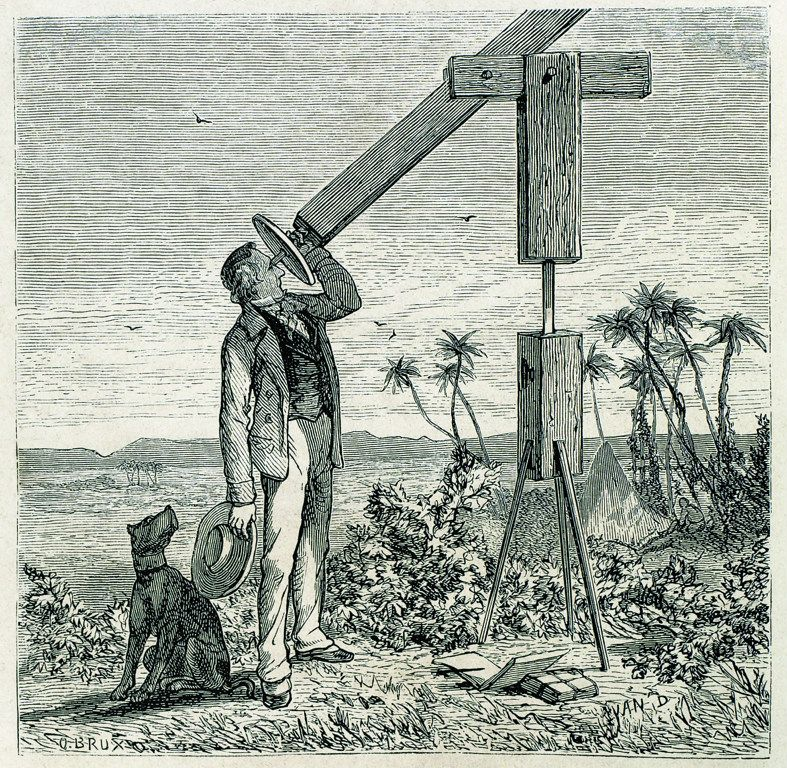
Emmanuel Liais observing the sky from Brazil from an illustrated print work of Yan' Dargent (1824–1899)

Emmanuel Liais (15 February 1826 – 5 March 1900) was a French astronomer, botanist and explorer who spent many years in Brazil.

He was born in Cherbourg, the son of a wealthy family in the shipbuilding industry.

He was an amateur scientist and made some meteorological observations and wrote some papers. The astronomer François Arago took note of one of his papers written in 1852, which determined that the weather in his hometown was milder than that of Paris.

He then went to Paris in 1854 and worked at the Paris Observatory. There he assisted Urbain Le Verrier in creating a telegraphic meteorological network. He went to Brazil to observe the solar eclipse of September 7, 1858 and ended up staying there for a long time. He became a close acquaintance of the Brazilian Emperor Dom Pedro II, and became the director of the Imperial Observatory at Rio de Janeiro from January to July 1871 and again from 1874 to 1881.

Although the observatory had been founded in 1827, in reality it was occupied mostly with teaching students of military schools. Liais reorganized it to concentrate on research.

He discovered the comet C/1860 D1 (Liais). This was his only comet discovery and the first comet discovered in Brazil.

He made astronomical observations of Mars and in 1865 speculated that the dark albedo features were vegetation and not water (in fact, as we know today, they are neither).

At the behest of the emperor, he made extensive exploration expeditions within Brazil and studied the plants of remote regions, sending some of them to France. He wrote a book entitled Climats, géologie, faune et géographie botanique du Brésil (Paris: Garnier Frères, 1872).

In 1878 a public dispute developed between him and Manoel Pereira Reis and his position at the observatory gradually became untenable. At the beginning of 1881 he resigned and returned to his hometown of Cherbourg.

He was mayor of Cherbourg from 1884–1886 and again from 1892 until his death in 1900. He imported exotic plants from South America and Asia to Cherbourg.

He married a Dutch woman, Margaritha Trovwen, and they had no children. He bequeathed his property, located in a magnificent botanical park, to the city of Cherbourg. It is now known as the Emmanuel Liais Gardens.

A crater on Mars is named after him. In addition to the park named after him, there is also "Emmanuel Liais" street in Cherbourg.
