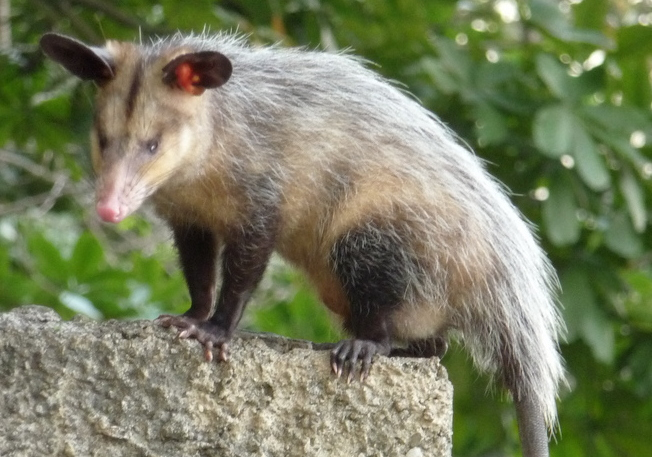
- In an urban area of Caracas, Venezuela

Conservation status
- Least Concern (IUCN 3.1)

Scientific classification
- Kingdom: Animalia
- Phylum: Chordata
- Class: Mammalia
- Infraclass: Marsupialia
- Order: Didelphimorphia
- Family: Didelphidae
- Genus: Didelphis
- Species: D. marsupialis

Binomial name
- Didelphis marsupialis Linnaeus, 1758
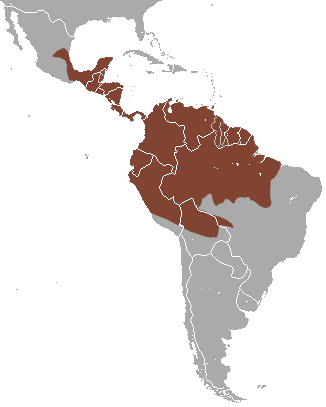
- Common opossum range

Synonyms
- Didelphis marsupialis marsupialis

= Common opossum =

Species of marsupial

The common opossum (Didelphis marsupialis), also called the northern black-eared opossum, is a species of marsupial living from the northeast of Mexico to Bolivia (reaching the coast of the South Pacific Ocean to the central coast of Peru), including Trinidad and Tobago as well as the Windward Islands in the Caribbean, where it is referred to as the manicou. The common opossum prefers forests, but can also be found in fields and cities.

== Habitat and shelter ==
The common opossum is found in tropical and subtropical forest, both primary and secondary, at altitudes of up to 2,200 m (7,200 ft). They use a wide range of nest sites. Most commonly, they will create one in the hollow of a tree; However, they will also dig a burrow or nest in any dark location if nothing else is suitable (which often gets them in trouble with humans). Opossums enjoy denning underground, but do not spend as much time underground during the dry season.

== Description ==
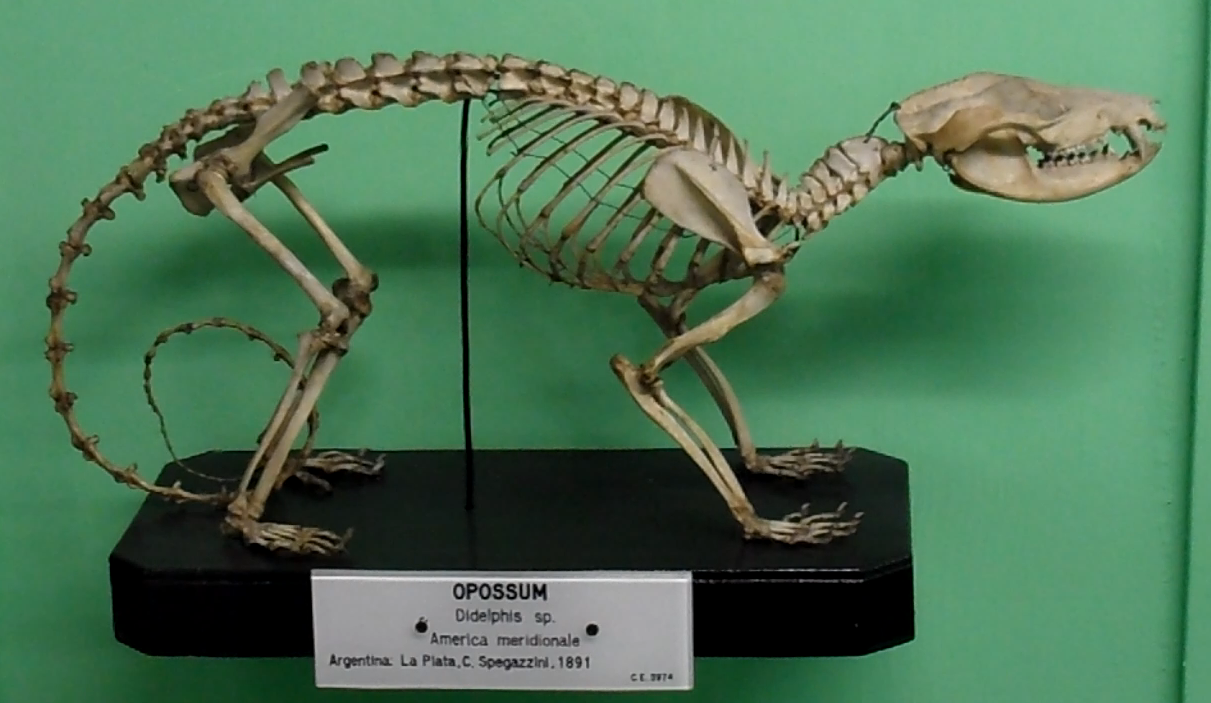
Skeleton, Natural History Museum of Genoa

The common opossum is similar in size to a house cat. The fur of the opossum is actually yellow in the under-fur, but is hidden by the longer black guard-hairs that cover it, while the tail, fingers, and face are lighter with the tail being without fur. It can measure nearly 20 inches (51 cm) long. It has large ears that are usually black, and its face is usually a pale peach in color, with black whiskers and eyes that reflect reddish in light. With a body length of nearly a foot, and a tail that can reach almost two feet, the common opossum is one of the larger members of the Didelphidae family. Adult opossums can weigh more than three pounds.

== Behavior ==
Their activity is mainly nocturnal and terrestrial, with some arboreal exploration and nesting. Outside of mating, they are usually solitary. A male opossum's home range (distance traveled at night) can vary in size from wet to dry seasons, while females have a more stationary home range when they are breeding. Males are most active between 11 pm and 3 am. Common opossums can be considered pests due to their somewhat raccoon-like behavior, such as raiding trash cans, nesting in locations that are not suitable, and causing mayhem if encountered within a human living space. As a result, they are often trapped and killed. Opossums have not been observed to be territorial. The common opossum is a host of the acanthocephalan intestinal parasite Gigantorhynchus lutzi.

Common predators of the opossum are great horned owls, American barn owls, bobcats, cougars, domestic dogs, domestic cats, coyotes, and boa constrictors. Similarly to other opossum species, when they are in danger, they act dead, which is referred to as 'playing possum.'

=== Diet ===
Common opossums have a broad ability to adapt to environmental changes, and their teeth allow them to eat many different types of food, which they obtain primarily on the ground. They can eat insects (such as beetles and grasshoppers) and other invertebrates (such as earthworms), small vertebrates (toads [such as cane toads], snakes [such as South American rattlesnakes], birds [such as lance-tailed manakins], and small mammals), fruits, vegetables, nectar, and also carrion. In urban areas, they may find articles of food in compost piles and garbage cans. Their ability to digest almost anything edible gives them a broader range of food sources than that of humans.

=== Reproduction ===
Female opossums have five to nine offspring between one and three times per year after maturity. The mother raises the young by herself. The common opossum can mate for the majority of the calendar year. They do not mate for life. Female opossums can give birth to at most 24 infants; however, only a third of them usually survive. Young opossums stay with the mother for the first few months of their lives and reach maturity before they are a year old.

=== Lifespan ===
The common opossum lives for around two to four years maximum.

== Classification ==
They are members of the genus Didelphis, which contains the largest American opossums, and the order Didelphimorphia, to which most Western hemisphere opossums belong (excluding the seven species of shrew opossums). The common opossum is currently not an endangered species.
