= Trisol =

Trisol may refer to:

- Trisol, desert planet featured in the 1999 episode "My Three Suns" from the American animated series Futurama
- Trisol Music Group, German business group and record label
