= List of Rocko's Modern Life episodes =

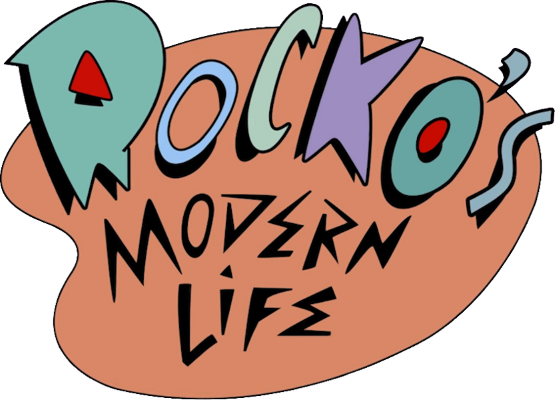

Rocko's Modern Life is an American animated television series created by Joe Murray. It premiered on Nickelodeon on September 18, 1993, and ended on November 24, 1996, with a total of 52 episodes over the course of 4 seasons. A typical, half-hour episode of Rocko's Modern Life featured two twelve-minute stories with a commercial break in between. Occasionally, one story would be told over the half-hour time slot as Part I and Part II.

The Rocko's Modern Life team produced all of the episodes except for one in the San Fernando Valley region of Los Angeles, California, United States. Murray produced the pilot episode, Trash-O-Madness, in his studio in Saratoga, California; Murray animated half of the episode, and the production occurred entirely in the United States, with animation in Saratoga and processing in San Francisco.

On August 11, 2016, Nickelodeon announced that they had greenlit a one-hour special titled Static Cling, with Murray serving as executive producer. It premiered on Netflix on August 9, 2019.

== Series overview ==
| Season | Segments | Episodes | Originally released | | |
| Season | Segments | Episodes | First released | Last released | Network |
|---|---|---|---|---|---|
| 1 | 26 | 13 | September 18, 1993 | January 2, 1994 | Nickelodeon |
| 2 | 23 | 13 | September 24, 1994 | March 12, 1995 | Nickelodeon |
| 3 | 25 | 13 | October 22, 1995 | April 21, 1996 | Nickelodeon |
| 4 | 26 | 13 | July 8, 1996 | November 24, 1996 | Nickelodeon |
| Static Cling | | | August 9, 2019 | | Netflix |

== Episodes ==
=== Pilot (1992) ===
| Title | Written and Directed by | Original release date |
|---|---|---|
| Trash-O-Madness | Joe Murray | October 29, 1992 |
Rocko scrambles to gather up his trash and take it out because the garbage men haven’t come to pick up the trash for six months, but Earl, an escaped laboratory dog makes Rocko’s time taking out the trash tough. Murray produced the pilot episode at Joe Murray Studio in Saratoga, California, United States. Note: On February 7, 2012, the pilot found its way onto Shout! Factory's season two DVD as a special feature.

=== Season 1 (1993–94) ===
| No. overall | No. in season | Title | Directed by | Story by | Storyboard by | Original release date | Prod. code | Viewers (millions) |
|---|---|---|---|---|---|---|---|---|
| 1 | 1 | "A Sucker for the Suck-O-Matic" | Stephen Hillenburg | Joe Murray, Nick Jennings & George Maestri | Jeff "Swampy" Marsh | September 18, 1993 | 002 | 3.0 |
| 1 | 1 | "Canned" | Doug Lawrence | Joe Murray, Nick Jennings & George Maestri | Robert McNally-Scull | September 18, 1993 | 002 | 3.0 |
To get his house clean, Rocko orders a vacuum cleaner that not only tackles dirt, but sucks up anything and everything in sight. Rocko loses his job at the mega-comic store and goes hunting for a new one.
| 2 | 2 | "Carnival Knowledge" | Timothy Berglund | Vince Calandra | Jeff Myers | September 26, 1993 | 001 | 2.25 (HH) (Note: (HH) indicates the amount of households an episode was viewed in when it premiered.) |
| 2 | 2 | "Sand in Your Navel" | Roger Chiasson | Joe Murray | Doug Lawrence | September 26, 1993 | 001 | 2.25 (HH) |
Rocko and Heffer attend a carnival full of hazardous rides and shady carnival games. Rocko and Spunky try to spend a nice day at the beach.
| 3 | 3 | "Who's for Dinner?" | Doug Lawrence | Vince Calandra & Ron Hauge | Dan Povenmire | October 3, 1993 | 004 | N/A |
| 3 | 3 | "Love Spanked" | Stephen Hillenburg | Joe Murray | Mark Ervin & Joe Suggs | October 3, 1993 | 004 | N/A |
Rocko, unaware of Heffer's family life, is invited over to dinner at Heffer's house. Things get sticky when Rocko's offhand remark about Heffer being adopted drives Heffer to run away from home to eat away his sorrow and find his real father. Note: One of Murray's favorite episodes is "Who's for Dinner?" because Murray enjoyed the premise and the development of the concept of adoption. Murray partially based Heffer on an adopted friend and used his friend's emotions to sculpt Heffer's role and actions. Rocko is infatuated with his next-door neighbor, Melba, but when Heffer tells Rocko that Melba already has a boyfriend, Rocko ventures into the world of blind dates and modern love.
| 4 | 4 | "Rocko's Happy Sack" | Timothy Berglund | Ron Hauge & Joe Murray | Kevin O'Brien | October 10, 1993 | 003 | N/A |
| 4 | 4 | "Flu-In-U-Enza" | Roger Chiasson | Joe Murray & Nichole Poinski | Ray Johnson & Don Spencer | October 10, 1993 | 003 | N/A |
Being broke and hungry, a 99% sale at Heap-O-Food sounds like the cure for Rocko. Rocko has tickets to the big wrestling match, but he suddenly falls ill.
| 5 | 5 | "Clean Lovin'" | Roger Chiasson | Vince Calandra, Ron Hauge, Nick Jennings, George Maestri & Joe Murray | Conrad Vernon | October 24, 1993 | 005 | N/A |
| 5 | 5 | "Unbalanced Load" | Timothy Berglund | Vince Calandra & Joe Murray | Jeff Myers | October 24, 1993 | 005 | N/A |
Spunky's unnatural attraction to a mop vexes Rocko. Note: On the production of this episode, Murray wrote the "Spunky falls in love with a mop" idea for his original series pitch; the focus groups adored the idea. When Murray created the episode, he believed that the creation was "more challenging than I thought. It sounded funny though." Rocko's trip to the laundromat to clean his dirty clothes turns into a surreal misadventure involving embarrassing encounters with Gladys the Hippo Lady and a trip inside a dryer to get his lucky shirt back from The Gripes, a band of missing socks who destroy laundry.
| 6 | 6 | "Leap Frogs" | Doug Lawrence | Vince Calandra | Robert McNally-Scull | October 31, 1993 | 006 | N/A |
| 6 | 6 | "Bedfellows" | Stephen Hillenburg | Nick Jennings & George Maestri | Jeff "Swampy" Marsh | October 31, 1993 | 006 | N/A |
Feeling that her husband, Ed Bighead does not love her anymore, Ed's wife, Bev Bighead invites Rocko over to do chores for her and does everything she can to seduce Rocko. Note: Due to the episode's sexual humor, "Leap Frogs" was removed from airing for the rest of the series' run on Nickelodeon. Starting on May 21, 1998, "Bedfellows" would be repaired with season 4's "Wallaby on Wheels," and it was given the production code #053. Heffer's dad, George gets laid off and to make ends meet, Heffer's room is rent out to a mouse family. After falling out of his treehouse, Heffer moves in with Rocko and makes a mess of his place.
| 7 | 7 | "No Pain, No Gain" | Timothy Berglund | Vince Calandra | Jeff Myers & Kevin O'Brien | November 14, 1993 | 007 | N/A |
| 7 | 7 | "Who Gives a Buck" | Roger Chiasson & Don Spencer | Martin Olson | Conrad Vernon | November 14, 1993 | 007 | N/A |
Rocko and Heffer decide to join Flambe le Flab, an exclusive high-end gym, but getting in is no easy task, thanks to the snobby Chameleon Brothers, Chuck and Leon, who deduct points off them for everything from wearing the wrong attire to destroying gym property. Guest star: Richard Simmons as the Aerobics Instructor Worried about being able to afford new things, Heffer urges Rocko to buy on credit and he goes on a shopping spree, with him worried that he'll have to pay off the bill.
| 8 | 8 | "Jet Scream" | Stephen Hillenburg | Vince Calandra | Mark O'Hare | November 21, 1993 | 008 | N/A |
| 8 | 8 | "Dirty Dog" | Doug Lawrence | Martin Olson | Dan Povenmire | November 21, 1993 | 008 | N/A |
Rocko and Heffer board an airplane to Las Vegas and learn that flying is a very dangerous thing. Note: Murray described "Jet Scream" as one of his favorite episodes because he often traveled between Los Angeles, New York, South Korea and other places during the production of the first season of Rocko's Modern Life. While Rocko fights Spunky in order to bathe him, the vermin living on Spunky, a ringworm named Squirmy and a tick named Bloaty have their own sitcom, where Bloaty's boss comes over for dinner and promises a promotion if the dinner exceeds his expectations. Note: "Dirty Dog" marks the first appearances of Bloaty and Squirmy. However, after the 2001 attack on the World Trade Center, this episode was pulled from broadcast for a number of years. It does appear on DVD releases, was on Netflix, and is now on Paramount+. For unknown reasons, the Paramount+ version of "Dirty Dog" does not have the opening title card and credits.
| 9 | 9 | "Keeping Up with the Bigheads" | Stephen Hillenburg | Vince Calandra | Mark O'Hare & Jeff "Swampy" Marsh | December 5, 1993 | 009 | N/A |
| 9 | 9 | "Skid Marks" | Doug Lawrence | Martin Olson | Robert McNally-Scull | December 5, 1993 | 009 | N/A |
Rocko and Heffer must redecorate Rocko's house after Ed threatens to have them evicted. Rocko's car is impounded, so he goes to the DMV to straighten things out.
| 10 | 10 | "The Good, the Bad and the Wallaby" | Jeff "Swampy" Marsh | George Maestri | Dan Povenmire | December 12, 1993 | 010 | N/A |
| 10 | 10 | "Trash-O-Madness" | Joe Murray & Timothy Berglund | Joe Murray | Joe Murray & Jeff Myers | December 12, 1993 | 010 | N/A |
Rocko and Heffer spend some time on a ranch owned by Rocko's uncle Gib Hootsen, where Heffer is seen as a sell-out to his species. Note: Subsequent reruns of "The Good, the Bad and the Wallaby" in the United States cut the entire scene where Heffer is hooked to a milk machine and has a sexual reaction to it as well as the part near the end where Heffer tearfully says goodbye to the machine. While the Rocko's Modern Life: The Complete Series DVD set does not have this scene, the Rocko's Modern Life VHS tape called "With Friends Like These..." has the scene uncut. A remade extended version of the series' pilot where Rocko learns that "garbage day" is a very dangerous day.
| 11 | 11 | "Power Trip" | Stephen Hillenburg | George Maestri | Mark O'Hare | December 19, 1993 | 011 | N/A |
| 11 | 11 | "To Heck and Back" | Doug Lawrence | Martin Olson | Robert McNally-Scull | December 19, 1993 | 011 | N/A |
Mr. Smitty, Rocko's tyrannical boss, places Rocko in charge while he leaves town. Heffer chokes on a chicken bone while he and Rocko are out eating at the Chokey Chicken, and has a near-death experience where a hooded figure known as Peaches tries to show Heffer the error of his ways.
| 12 | 12 | "Spitballs" | Timothy Berglund | Vince Calandra | Jeff Myers | December 26, 1993 | 012 | N/A |
| 12 | 12 | "Popcorn Pandemonium" | Jeff "Swampy" Marsh | Martin Olson | Dan Povenmire | December 26, 1993 | 012 | N/A |
After Rocko's prized baseball gets shredded by Ed, Rocko and Heffer go to a local baseball game in hopes of catching a new one. Rocko and Heffer are off to the local movie theater complex after blowing out Ed's television while trying to recreate a drive-in movie experience.
| 13 | 13 | "Cabin Fever" | Stephen Hillenburg | George Maestri, Mark O'Hare, Stephen Hillenburg & Joe Murray | Mark O'Hare | January 2, 1994 | 013 | N/A |
| 13 | 13 | "Rinse & Spit" | Doug Lawrence | Vince Calandra, Joe Murray, George Maestri & Martin Olson | Robert McNally-Scull | January 2, 1994 | 013 | N/A |
Rocko and Heffer end up sharing a camping cabin with the Bigheads. Filburt recruits Rocko to help him pass his dentist's examination. Note: This episode marks the first appearance of Dr. Hutchison. Although some flirting happens between her and Filburt, and he describes her to Rocko as cute, their relationship status (other than as student and teacher) is left ambiguous.

=== Season 2 (1994–95) ===
| No. overall | No. in season | Title | Animation direction by | Story by | Storyboard by | Original release date | Prod. code | U.S. households (millions) |
|---|---|---|---|---|---|---|---|---|
| 14 | 1 | "I Have No Son!" | Ken Kessel & George Chialtas | Joe Murray & Martin Olson | Stephen Hillenburg & Doug Lawrence (directors); Robert McNally-Scull & Mark O'Hare | September 24, 1994 | 014 | N/A |
Rocko discovers that the creator of his favorite TV show, The Fatheads, is Ed and Bev's estranged son, Ralph Bighead, whom Ed still hasn't forgiven for giving up the white-collar corporate life for a career in animation, and he and Filburt go to Holl-O-Wood to try and get Ralph back to O-Town in time for a Bighead family reunion. Note: Murray described "I Have No Son!" as one of his favorite episodes because it addressed issues affecting Murray, the directors, and the writers. Murray also cites the presence of The Fatheads, created by Doug Lawrence. This is also the first episode to feature the re-recorded version of the theme song rearranged by Pat Irwin and sung by Kate Pierson and Fred Schneider of the B-52's and is also the first episode to be full-length rather than half-length.
| 15 | 2 | "Pipe Dreams" | Roy Meurin | George Maestri, Stephen Hillenburg & Mark O'Hare | Stephen Hillenburg (director); Mark O'Hare | October 8, 1994 | 015 | N/A |
| 15 | 2 | "Tickled Pinky" | Pete Michels | Martin Olson | Jeff "Swampy" Marsh (director); Dan Povenmire | October 8, 1994 | 015 | N/A |
After Heffer flushes the potty one too many times (and not willing to pay for a real plumber), he and Rocko decide to fix the potty...and discover why the potty is clogged. While at O-Town's jackhammer convention, Rocko is rushed to the hospital for appendicitis (though Heffer is mistakenly taken to the emergency room for liposuction after muttering, "I'm too fat" to the receptionist and collapsing from exhaustion) and Rocko's anxiety over the operation leads to a strange dream where his appendix wants one more day of fun before he has to leave. Note: This episode is the second one in which Dr. Hutchison appears. It does not feature or mention Filburt.
| 16 | 3 | "The Lounge Singer" | George Chialtas | George Maestri | Jeff "Swampy" Marsh (director); Dan Povenmire | October 9, 1994 | 016 | 1.71 |
| 16 | 3 | "She's the Toad" | Alan Smart | Vince Calandra & Martin Olson | Doug Lawrence (director); Robert McNally-Scull | October 9, 1994 | 016 | 1.71 |
Filburt realizes his dream of being a lounge singer and hits the big time. On the eve of a huge proposal at work, Ed suffers a nervous breakdown, so Bev initially recruits Heffer and Filburt to take Ed's place. However, when the scheme falls apart and the duo admit that Bev wrote the proposal, Ed's boss, Mr. Dupette hires Bev instead.
| 17 | 4 | "Down the Hatch" | Howy Parkins | Martin Olson | Doug Lawrence (director); Robert McNally-Scull | October 23, 1994 | 017 | 1.71 |
| 17 | 4 | "Road Rash" | Pete Michels | George Maestri & Joe Murray | Jeff "Swampy" Marsh (director); Dan Povenmire | October 23, 1994 | 017 | 1.71 |
When Spunky swallows an explosive vitamin pill, our favorite parasites Bloaty and Squirmy think they've discovered an ancient and mysterious object. Flemm Rock is about to be bulldozed, so Rocko and Heffer go on a road trip to see it before its demolition. Note: After its initial airing, reruns of Road Rash in America cut the entire segment where Rocko and Heffer stay at a hotel that is heavily implied to be used for prostitution. The edited version shows a freeze-framed shot of the hotel, then fades into the next scene. The actual scene has not been shown since the episode premiered (including on the Rocko's Modern Life complete DVD set, on Netflix, and on Paramount+) and is only found on international cuts of the episode. However, the German release of the Rocko's Modern Life complete DVD set has the scene as an Easter egg feature while most video websites such as YouTube have a clip of the now-banned scene in varying quality.
| 18 | 5 | "Boob Tubed" | Alan Smart | Martin Olson | Stephen Hillenburg (director); Mark O'Hare | November 6, 1994 | 018 | N/A |
| 18 | 5 | "Commuted Sentence" | George Chialtas | Tim Hill & Joe Murray | Jeff "Swampy" Marsh (director); Dan Povenmire | November 6, 1994 | 018 | N/A |
Rocko accidentally buys a tricked-out entertainment system (rather than a "Mr. Sensible" TV set), but Heffer and Filburt take it in stride and enjoy the endless hours of TV...until Heffer gets his brain sucked out. Rocko's tardiness (mostly due to finding a parking spot for his car) is a problem for Mr. Smitty, and things get worse when a spilled ketchup bottle on the sidewalk leads to Rocko's car getting impounded.
| 19 | 6 | "Rocko's Modern Christmas!: Can't Squeeze Cheer from a Cheese Log!" (Note: More simply known as "Rocko's Modern Christmas") | Pete Michels & Howy Parkins | Martin Olson, Doug Lawrence, Joe Murray, Tim Hill & Robert McNally-Scull | Doug Lawrence (director); Robert McNally-Scull | December 1, 1994 | 019 | N/A |
Feeling lonely over being on his own during the holidays (and seeing a family of Christmas elves move into the house across the street) prompts Rocko to have a Christmas party inviting everyone in the neighborhood, but Heffer's and Filburt's new jobs as Christmas tree salesmen and Ed spreading rumors about the new neighbors threaten to break Rocko's newfound holiday cheer. Note: This episode is the third in which Dr. Hutchison appears, and the first in which she and Filburt are clearly in a romantic relationship.
| 20 | 7 | "Hut Sut Raw" | George Chialtas | Tim Hill & Joe Murray | Timothy Berglund (director); Jeff Myers | December 4, 1994 | 020 | N/A |
| 20 | 7 | "Kiss Me I'm Foreign" | Alan Smart | George Maestri & Martin Olson | Doug Lawrence (director); Robert McNally-Scull | December 4, 1994 | 020 | N/A |
Rocko, Heffer and Filburt go camping, but when Rocko discovers that their favorite campgrounds have taken the "rough" out of "roughing it", the trio decide to go to the woods to experience nature in all her glory...and horror. Note: The American rerun of this episode cuts the scene of Rocko picking berries from a bush to remove Rocko squeezing a berry that is actually the testicle of a bear. Much like the love motel sequence in "Road Rash", this scene has not been shown on American TV since its premiere and is not on any reruns or current home media and streaming versions in America. International versions have this scene uncut and video clips of the censored scene have cropped up online. An incompetent immigration officer declares Rocko to be an illegal immigrant who must be deported, and Filburt (who is having a hard time telling Dr. Hutchinson his true feelings for her) decides to step in and become Rocko's spouse.
| 21 | 8 | "Cruisin'" | Pete Michels & Howy Parkins | Vince Calandra & Martin Olson | Timothy Berglund (director); Jeff Myers | January 1, 1995 | 021 | 1.82 |
Rocko and Heffer are saddled with taking Grandpa Wolfe (the same one from "Who's For Dinner?" who thinks Rocko is a beaver and is prejudiced against him over it) on a cruise for the elderly, which goes through The Bermuda Triangle and swaps the ages of everyone onboard Rocko and Heffer become old men while all the cruise members become young again.
| 22 | 9 | "Born to Spawn" | Alan Smart | Martin Olson | Stephen Hillenburg (director); Mark O'Hare | January 22, 1995 | 022 | N/A |
| 22 | 9 | "Uniform Behavior" | George Chialtas | Martin Olson | Timothy Berglund (director); Jeff Myers | January 22, 1995 | 022 | N/A |
Filburt freaks out over his 21st birthday, which, in his species, calls for turtles to return to Kerplopitgoes Island. Heffer damages his father's car and takes a job as a security guard to pay it off, but the position goes to his head and leads him to have a Shining-style mental breakdown.
| 23 | 10 | "Junk Junkies" | Alan Smart | Tim Hill & Joe Murray | Stephen Hillenburg (director); Mark O'Hare | February 12, 1995 | 024 | N/A |
| 23 | 10 | "Day of the Flecko" | George Chialtas | Martin Olson | Timothy Berglund (director); Jeff Myers | February 12, 1995 | 024 | N/A |
Rocko needs to pay off the pizza man, so he organizes a garage sale. After pulling overtime at his job, Rocko goes home for some much-needed rest...until a fly named Flecko bothers him.
| 24 | 11 | "Snowballs" | Howy Parkins | Tim Hill & George Maestri | Stephen Hillenburg (director); Mark O'Hare | February 26, 1995 | 025 | N/A |
| 24 | 11 | "Frog's Best Friend" | Robert Hughes | George Maestri | Jeff "Swampy" Marsh (director); Dan Povenmire | February 26, 1995 | 025 | N/A |
On their way to deliver comic books, Rocko and Heffer are side-tracked by a trip to a ski resort that scams people. Earl the dog (the same one from the episode "Trash-O-Madness") escapes from the science lab and gets taken in by Bev as a family pet, which doesn't sit well with Ed.
| 25 | 12 | "Hair Licked" | John McIntyre | Tim Hill, Martin Olson & George Maestri | Timothy Berglund (director); Jeff Myers | March 5, 1995 | 023 | N/A |
| 25 | 12 | "Gutter Balls" | Howy Parkins | Carlos Alazraqui, Tim Hill, Martin Olson & Joe Murray | Jeff "Swampy" Marsh (director); Dan Povenmire | March 5, 1995 | 023 | N/A |
Rocko is having hair trouble days before he's supposed to get his picture taken for the newspaper. Once a promising young bowler, Ed is now reduced to coaching a women's auxiliary bowling team (consisting of Ed's wife, Bev; Heffer's mom, Virginia; and the Southern-accented pig lady from "Popcorn Pandemonium"). When the other team for an upcoming tournament announces that they've become monks (and Virginia adds that if their team doesn't play an opponent, then no one wins and the tournament will be canceled until next year), Ed rounds up Rocko, Heffer, and Filburt to be the competing team, which gives Ed flashbacks of how he ruined his pro bowling career.
| 26 | 13 | "Short Story" | Alan Smart | Tim Hill, Joe Murray & Jeff Myers | Timothy Berglund (director); Jeff Myers | March 12, 1995 | 026 | N/A |
| 26 | 13 | "Eyes Capades" | George Chialtas | Tim Hill & Andy Houts | Jeff "Swampy" Marsh (director); Dan Povenmire | March 12, 1995 | 026 | N/A |
Feeling inadequate due to short stature, Really Really Big Man gives Rocko a vertical boost. Rocko runs into trouble when he discovers he needs glasses right before a jackhammer-riding competition.

=== Season 3 (1995–96) ===
| No. overall | No. in season | Title | Animation direction by | Story by | Storyboard by | Original release date | Prod. code |
|---|---|---|---|---|---|---|---|
| 27 | 1 | "Bye, Bye Birdie" | Alan Smart | George Maestri | Doug Lawrence (director); Robert McNally-Scull | October 22, 1995 | 029 |
| 27 | 1 | "Belch of Destiny" | Howy Parkins | Martin Olson | Stephen Hillenburg (director); Mark O'Hare | October 22, 1995 | 029 |
Heffer accidentally kills Filburt's pet bird, Turdy. Note: George Maestri, a writer, described this episode as "a real story." At age 12, Maestri babysat a bird belonging to a family neighboring his. The bird died two days after the neighbors left. Heffer's unique talent for belching embarrasses his father, who wants Heffer to stop acting like a child and grow up. Note: Murray described this episode as one of his favorite episodes because the episode supported his theory to "let kids be kids". In addition, Murray recalled the memories of himself, Stephen Hillenburg, and Mark O'Hare laughing after listening to the "belch talking" track created by a Warner Bros. producer. Prior to the production of the tape, Murray and his crew arranged a meeting with the producer. During that period, the producer could not belch talk, even after Murray bought him beer and spaghetti. The belch talking tape arrived several days afterward.
| 28 | 2 | "The Emperor's New Joe" | Robert Hughes | George Maestri, Stephen Hillenburg & Mark O'Hare | Stephen Hillenburg (director); Mark O'Hare | October 29, 1995 | 028 |
| 28 | 2 | "Schnit-heads" | George Chialtas | Tim Hill | Timothy Berglund (director); Jeff Myers | October 29, 1995 | 028 |
The Chameleon Brothers open a trendy new café, but when Rocko tries the coffee and declares it horrible, Chuck and Leon try to convince him to give it another chance by telling him the story of how the Chameleon Brothers used their coffee to placate a temperamental dictator in their home country of Balzack. Heffer falls into a sausage-worshiping cult.
| 29 | 3 | "Sugar Frosted Frights" | Alan Smart | Martin Olson | Doug Lawrence (director); Robert McNally-Scull | October 31, 1995 | 027 |
| 29 | 3 | "Ed is Dead: A Thriller!" | Howy Parkins | Tim Hill | Timothy Berglund (director); Jeff Myers | October 31, 1995 | 027 |
Filburt overcomes his fear of Halloween and candy-eating (something instilled in him by his deranged aunt) and goes insane. In this episode inspired by Alfred Hitchcock's thrillers (specifically Rear Window and Psycho), a marital spat next door followed by a mysterious disappearance leads Rocko to believe that Bev murdered her husband, Ed.
| 30 | 4 | "Fish-N-Chumps" | Robert Hughes | Tim Hill, Stephen Hillenburg & Mark O'Hare | Stephen Hillenburg (director); Mark O'Hare | November 12, 1995 | 032B |
| 30 | 4 | "Camera Shy" | George Chialtas | Tim Hill | Doug Lawrence (director); Robert McNally-Scull | November 12, 1995 | 032A |
Rocko, Heffer and Filburt go on a fishing trip, unsuspecting that they are the prey. Rocko tries to send his parents a videotape of how he's doing in O-Town, but Heffer and Filburt use Rocko's camera to videotape Rocko's private moments (one of which becomes a hit on the independent film circuit).
| 31 | 5 | "Nothing to Sneeze At" | Robert Hughes | George Maestri | Doug Lawrence (director); Robert McNally-Scull | December 2, 1995 | 030 |
| 31 | 5 | "Old Fogey Froggy" | George Chialtas | Tim Hill & George Maestri | Stephen Hillenburg (director); Mark O'Hare | December 2, 1995 | 030 |
A mistake at the hospital endows Bev with a nose, but the stench of her husband Ed is making her sick. When Ed feels youth slipping away, he tries to become friends with Rocko, Heffer, and Filburt.
| 32 | 6 | "Manic Mechanic" | Howy Parkins | Tim Hill | Jeff "Swampy" Marsh (director); Dan Povenmire | December 3, 1995 | 031 |
| 32 | 6 | "Rocko's Happy Vermin" | Alan Smart | George Maestri & Carlos Alazraqui | Timothy Berglund (director); Jeff Myers | December 3, 1995 | 031 |
Rocko's car breaks down, but Filburt can bring it back to life. When Rocko helps the bugs escape from Ed's prison, they become unwelcome guests.
| 33 | 7 | "Fortune Cookie" | George Chialtas | Tim Hill, Stephen Hillenburg & Mark O'Hare | Stephen Hillenburg (director); Mark O'Hare | December 17, 1995 | 034B |
| 33 | 7 | "Dear John" | Robert Hughes | Tim Hill | Jeff "Swampy" Marsh (director); Dan Povenmire | December 17, 1995 | 034A |
Filburt's chance to win on a game show may be in danger when he receives a fortune cookie that reads, "Bad luck and extreme misfortune will infest your pathetic soul for all eternity." Rocko hires TV host Bob "Bucky" Taylor to repair his destroyed kitchen, but finds out that Bucky can only build bathrooms.
| 34 | 8 | "Speaking Terms" | Howy Parkins | Tim Hill | Doug Lawrence (director); Robert McNally-Scull | December 31, 1995 | 035 |
| 34 | 8 | "Tooth and Nail" | Alan Smart | Martin Olson | Timothy Berglund (director); Jeff Myers | December 31, 1995 | 035 |
On an episode of the talk show, Nosey, Rocko and Heffer tell their sides of the story of Rocko's birthday and the makeshift gift Heffer made to cover up the fact he forgot it. Rocko tries to overcome his nail-biting habit.
| 35 | 9 | "Wacky Delly" | Alan Smart & Howy Parkins | Joe Murray & Martin Olson | Jeff "Swampy" Marsh (director); Dan Povenmire & Mark O'Hare | January 21, 1996 | 037 |
Ralph wants to leave the world of television animation, so he gives Rocko, Filburt and Heffer free rein in creating a new television show, hoping that their ineptitude will get Ralph's contract cancelled. When it becomes a hit, however, Ralph does what he can to ruin Wacky Delly. Note: Murray described "Wacky Delly" as one of his favorite episodes because it addressed issues affecting Murray, the directors, and the writers (most notably how Joe Murray wanted to quit his own show following his first wife's suicide as he felt his time away from her led to her taking her own life and how Nickelodeon wouldn't let him). Murray and Richard Leroy filmed the live-action meatloaf scene on Murray's patio with a wind-up camera to capture the colors of early 1960s films. Murray cooked the meatloaf and Carol Wyatt, the color supervisor, placed press-on nails on her hand and used her hands in the scene. At first, the camera did not work. When Murray decided to end the shoot, the camera functioned, allowing for the shoot to continue. During the filming, two flies landed on the meatloaf. Leroy believed that the flies spoiled the shoot, while Murray believed that the flies enhanced the shoot. Murray used the plates involved in the production of the scene until he accidentally broke the plates; Murray discarded the plates. This is also the last episode to be a full-length episode. The rest of the series is half-length, although the next two episodes make a full-length two-parter.
| 36 | 10 | "The Big Question" | George Chialtas | Tim Hill & Martin Olson | Doug Lawrence (director); Robert McNally-Scull | January 28, 1996 | 038 |
| 36 | 10 | "The Big Answer" "The Wedding" | Robert Hughes | Tim Hill & Martin Olson | Doug Lawrence (director); Robert McNally-Scull | January 28, 1996 | 038 |
Filburt finally asks Doctor Hutchison to marry him. Note: This is the first part of a two-parter, Murray describes the two-parter as one of his favorite episodes. A huge fight breaks out at the wedding, threatening Filburt and Hutch's marriage. Note: This is the second and final part of a two-parter, Murray describes the two-parter as one of his favorite episodes. Guest star: Kevin Meaney as Widow Hutchison
| 37 | 11 | "An Elk for Heffer" | George Chialtas | Tim Hill | Jeff "Swampy" Marsh (director); Dan Povenmire | February 11, 1996 | 036 |
| 37 | 11 | "Scrubbin' Down Under" | Robert Hughes | George Maestri | Timothy Berglund (director); Jeff Myers | February 11, 1996 | 036 |
In order to be considered an adult, the Wolves tell Heffer to bring elk home for dinner, but ends up falling in love with it. Rocko wins a comic book store award, but becomes more known for the spinach stuck in his teeth. After using a jackhammer to try and get the spinach out, Rocko ends up in the hospital and gets a visit from Gene, the Hygiene Genie.
| 38 | 12 | "I See London, I See France" | Alan Smart | Joe Murray, Tim Hill & George Maestri | Stephen Hillenburg (director); Mark O'Hare | February 25, 1996 | 033B |
| 38 | 12 | "The Fat Lands" | Howy Parkins | Martin Olson & Tim Hill | Jeff "Swampy" Marsh (director); Dan Povenmire | February 25, 1996 | 033A |
On a trip to France, Rocko falls in love...and a deranged tour guide stalks Rocko and Heffer. Bloaty and Squirmy return, this time living on an obese Spunky, as Rocko tries to get Spunky to lose weight.
| 39 | 13 | "Zanzibar!" | Robert Hughes & Howy Parkins | Tim Hill | Jeff "Swampy" Marsh (director); Dan Povenmire | April 21, 1996 | 039 |
| 39 | 13 | "Fatal Contraption" | Alan Smart | Tim Hill & Joe Murray | Timothy Berglund (director); Jeff Myers | April 21, 1996 | 039 |
This musical style episode has Rocko pitting the town citizens against Conglom-O and their pollution. Rocko becomes the owner of a possessed food processor. Note: Aside from a few vocal effects from Rocko and the voice of the announcer for Food-O-Matic, "Fatal Contraption" is a mostly silent cartoon.

=== Season 4 (1996) ===
| No. overall | No. in season | Title | Animation direction by | Story by | Storyboard by | Original release date | Prod. code |
|---|---|---|---|---|---|---|---|
| 40 | 1 | "With Friends Like These" | Robert Hughes | George Maestri | Mark O'Hare (director); Derek Drymon | July 8, 1996 | 040 |
| 40 | 1 | "Sailing the Seven Zzz's" | George Chialtas | George Maestri | Robert McNally-Scull (director); Rob Porter | July 8, 1996 | 040 |
Rocko must choose between Filburt and Heffer to invite to a wrestling match. Note: Filburt, arguing with Heffer about who is Rocko's best friend, says "I was married to him", a reference to Rocko and Filburt's "marriage" in "Kiss Me I'm Foreign". A traumatic childhood experience leads Ed to sleepwalk and think he's a pirate.
| 41 | 2 | "Pranksters" | George Chialtas | George Maestri | Mark O'Hare (director); Derek Drymon | July 9, 1996 | 042 |
| 41 | 2 | "From Here to Maternity" | Robert Hughes | Martin Olson | Robert McNally-Scull (director); Rob Porter | July 9, 1996 | 042 |
April Fool's day arrives in O-Town and Filburt becomes the butt of Rocko and Heffer's pranks. But things change when a relative of Rocko's is expected to visit. Filburt and Hutch are expecting babies.
| 42 | 3 | "Ed Good, Rocko Bad" | Alan Smart | George Maestri | Jeff "Swampy" Marsh (director); Dan Povenmire | July 10, 1996 | 044 |
| 42 | 3 | "Teed Off" | Robert Hughes | Tim Hill | Mark O'Hare (director); Derek Drymon | July 10, 1996 | 044 |
Rocko runs for city dog catcher after being mistaken for a dog and spending time in the pound, but Ed runs against him and hires the Chameleon Brothers to make Rocko out to be a menace to society. In this loose, kid-friendly homage to the 1980s comedy, Caddyshack, Mr. Dupette (the one who was once Rocko's boss on "Canned" and is now CEO of Conglom-O) invites Ed to a game of golf. Ed is told to let Mr. Dupette win, but golf course employee Heffer has other ideas.
| 43 | 4 | "Wimp on the Barby" | George Chialtas | Martin Olson | Robert McNally-Scull (director); Rob Porter | July 11, 1996 | 045 |
| 43 | 4 | "Yarnbenders" | Howy Parkins | Tim Hill | Jeff Myers (director); John McIntyre | July 11, 1996 | 045 |
Rocko's old grade-school bully, Dingo, stops by for a visit, and Heffer and Filburt want Rocko to take revenge on him for bullying him. However, when Dingo arrives, Rocko is shocked to learn that he is now a peace loving Hare Krishna calling himself "Foofy No-no". Filburt is ill, so Rocko and Heffer spin up some wild fairy tales to help him feel better.
| 44 | 5 | "Mama's Boy" | George Chialtas | George Maestri | Mark O'Hare (director); Derek Drymon | July 12, 1996 | 046 |
| 44 | 5 | "Feisty Geist" | Robert Hughes | Tim Hill | Jeff "Swampy" Marsh (director); Dan Povenmire | July 12, 1996 | 046 |
Heffer moves out after being mocked for still living with his parents and relying on his mom to do everything, and finds that living on one's own and working is a very dangerous life. In this homage to Ghostbusters, Heffer is haunted by the ghost of a Genghis Khan-style general who recognizes Heffer as the incarnation of an incompetent soldier he once had in his army, and he, Rocko, and Filburt use exorcising cream and squirt guns in order to get rid of the spirit.
| 45 | 6 | "S.W.A.K." | Alan Smart | Martin Olson | Jeff Myers (director); John McIntyre | July 15, 1996 | 047 |
| 45 | 6 | "Magic Meatball" | Howy Parkins | Tim Hill & George Maestri | Mark O'Hare (director); Derek Drymon | July 15, 1996 | 047 |
Rocko sends a love letter to a mail carrier, but when he thinks she has a boyfriend, he tries to get it back. Ed is finally promoted (albeit on a whim by the higher-ups) at Conglom-O and relies on a fortune-telling toy called The Magic Meatball in order to make quick executive decisions or face demotion.
| 46 | 7 | "Closet Clown" | George Chialtas | Tim Hill & Stephen Hillenburg | Robert McNally-Scull (director); Rob Porter | July 16, 1996 | 048 |
| 46 | 7 | "Seat to Stardom" | Robert Hughes | Tim Hill | Jeff Myers (director); John McIntyre | July 16, 1996 | 048 |
After kicking out a clown, Ed finds the clown's red nose and leads a double life as Ed the Clown. Rocko becomes a famous underwear model, "Wedgie Boy", but the lack of free time strains his friendship with Heffer.
| 47 | 8 | "The High Five of Doom" | Pete Michels | Martin Olson | Jeff "Swampy" Marsh (director); Dan Povenmire | July 17, 1996 | 041 |
| 47 | 8 | "Fly Burgers" | Howy Parkins | George Maestri | Jeff Myers (director); John McIntyre | July 17, 1996 | 041 |
After Rocko and Heffer find his diary, Filburt is suspected of being an alien. Flecko the fly sues Rocko and Rocko is sentenced to live life as a fly.
| 48 | 9 | "Heff in a Handbasket" | Alan Smart | Martin Olson & Stephen Hillenburg | Robert McNally-Scull (director); Rob Porter | July 18, 1996 | 043 |
| 48 | 9 | "Wallaby on Wheels" | Howy Parkins | Tim Hill | Jeff "Swampy" Marsh & Dan Povenmire | July 18, 1996 | 043 |
Heffer once again meets up with that inept devil, Peaches, after Heffer sells his soul to be on a game show. To impress the skater girl he fell for at first sight, Rocko tries his hand at roller-skating, and ends up skating through the rink's most dangerous obstacle course.
| 49 | 10 | "Dumbells" | Robert Hughes | George Maestri & Stephen Hillenburg | Robert McNally-Scull (director); Rob Porter | July 19, 1996 | 050 |
| 49 | 10 | "Rug Birds" | George Chialtas | Tim Hill | Jeff Myers (director); John McIntyre | July 19, 1996 | 050 |
Rocko and Gladys the Hippo lady get arrested after a game of doorbell ditch gets out of hand, while Heffer and Filburt suffer the guilt of having Rocko blamed for their crimes. Filburt takes Rocko on a bird wig-snatching hunt.
| 50 | 11 | "Hypno-Puppy Luv" | Howy Parkins | Martin Olson | Jeff Myers (director); John McIntyre | October 8, 1996 | 051 |
| 50 | 11 | "Driving Mrs. Wolfe" | Alan Smart | Veronica Alicino | Dan Povenmire (director); Antoine Gulibaud | October 8, 1996 | 051 |
Heffer hypnotizes Rocko into thinking he's a dog, and Bev takes Rocko the dog in as her new pet. Rocko tells the story of how teaching Heffer's mom how to drive led to them fighting for their lives at a demolition derby.
| 51 | 12 | "Put to Pasture" | George Chialtas | Tim Hill & Stephen Hillenburg | Mark O'Hare (director); Derek Drymon | October 10, 1996 | 052 |
| 51 | 12 | "Future Schlock" | Robert Hughes | Tim Hill & Stephen Hillenburg | Robert McNally-Scull (director); Rob Porter | October 10, 1996 | 052 |
Heffer ends up in a coma after eating too much Pasture Puffies. While in a coma, Rocko, Filburt, and the Bigheads reminisce about the first time they met Heffer. 17 years into the future, Filburt's children ask an elderly-looking Filburt the meaning of a banana which they found in a refrigerator. Note: While not having aired as the final episode, Joe Murray considers this the official series finale. The episode was originally intended to be the final episode, but Nickelodeon mixed up the production codes when broadcasting the show.
| 52 | 13 | "Turkey Time" | Alan Smart | Tim Hill, George Maestri & Stephen Hillenburg | Mark O'Hare (director); Derek Drymon | November 24, 1996 | 049 |
| 52 | 13 | "Floundering Fathers" | Howy Parkins | George Maestri | Jeff "Swampy" Marsh (director); Dan Povenmire | November 24, 1996 | 049 |
It's Thanksgiving in O-Town, and Rocko tries to save the turkeys. Rocko, Heffer, and Filburt spin tales about who really founded O-Town. Note: Despite being Nickelodeon's final episode to air (as they saved this for last so it can air on Thanksgiving Day in America), the real series finale (barring the finale special, Static Cling) is "Future Schlock", according to series creator, Joe Murray.

=== Static Cling (2019) ===
In 2019, Netflix acquired rights to stream a new Rocko special, titled Static Cling.

| Title | Directed by | Written by | Storyboard by | Original release date |
|---|---|---|---|---|
| Static Cling | Joe Murray and Cosmo Serguson | Doug Lawrence, Joe Murray, and Martin Olson | Dan Becker, Cosmo Serguson, Tom Smith, and Joe Murray | August 9, 2019 |
Rocko and his friends return to O-Town after 20 years in space ("Future Shlock"), finding that much has changed in the 21st century. While Heffer and Filburt are enjoying 21st century life, Rocko feels nostalgic for the 1990s, and believes the best way to relive his past is to urge Rachel Bighead, who in her past life as Ralph Bighead was the original creator of his favorite TV show, to create a revival.
