= At the End of the Day =

At the End of the Day may refer to:

- At the End of the Day: The Sue Rodriguez Story, a Canadian documentary film
- At the End of the Day (film)
- At the End of the Day (Disagree album)
- At the End of the Day (Galactic Cowboys album)
- "At the End of the Day" (song), a song by Kellie Coffey
- "At the End of the Day" (Les Misérables), a song from Les Misérables
- At the End of the Day, an album by Dervish
- "At the End of the Day", a song by Mike Rutherford from Smallcreep's Day
- "At the End of the Day", a song by Spock's Beard from V
- "At the End of the Day", a song by Wallows from Tell Me That It's Over
