= Teed Off =

Teed Off may refer to:

- "Teed Off" (The Detectives)
- "Teed Off" (Rocko's Modern Life)
- National Lampoon's Teed Off
