= Rocko's Modern Life =

American animated television series

- Genre: Animated sitcom; Dark comedy; Surreal humor; Satire; Slapstick
- Created by: Joe Murray
- Creative director: Stephen Hillenburg (season 4)
- Voices of: Carlos Alazraqui; Tom Kenny; Mr. Lawrence; Charlie Adler
- Opening theme: "Rocko's Modern Life Theme" performed by The B-52's
- Composer: Pat Irwin
- Country of origin: United States
- Original language: English
- No. of seasons: 4
- No. of episodes: 52 (100 segments) (list of episodes)

Production
- Producers: Joe Murray (seasons 1–3); Stephen Hillenburg (season 4)
- Running time: 22 minutes
- Production companies: Joe Murray Productions (Note: Uncredited on seasons 1–2; credited as Joe Murray Studios Company on the pilot.); Games Animation Inc. (Note: Was not involved in the pilot.)

Original release
- Network: Nickelodeon
- Release: September 18, 1993 – November 24, 1996

Rocko's Modern Life is an American animated comedy television series created by Joe Murray for Nickelodeon. The series premiered on September 18, 1993, and ended on November 24, 1996, totaling four seasons and 52 episodes. Set in the fictional town of O-Town, the series centers on the surreal life of an anthropomorphic Australian immigrant wallaby named Rocko and his friends: the eccentric steer Heffer Wolfe, the neurotic turtle Filburt, and Rocko's faithful dog Spunky. Throughout its run, the series was controversial for its adult humor, including innuendos and satirical social commentary, helping pave the way for adult animation and earning a cult following, akin to The Ren & Stimpy Show.

Murray conceptualized the series after encountering a wallaby at a zoo in California's Bay Area. He pitched Rocko's Modern Life to Nickelodeon creative executive Linda Simensky, leading him to develop the pilot "Trash-O-Madness". Compared to other animated series at the time, Murray cast stand-up comedians in San Francisco, California, and took a collaborative approach alongside multiple crew members in writing and animation. With influences from Looney Tunes, SCTV, and underground comics, the series uses surreal humor to emphasize its squash-and-stretch animation and satirical storytelling.

Rocko's Modern Life initially received mixed-to-positive reviews, with some unfavorably comparing it to The Ren & Stimpy Show; however, it achieved critical acclaim in retrospect, with critics praising its satirical nature of American life, expressive acting, and detailed animation. It launched the careers of voice actors Carlos Alazraqui, Tom Kenny, and Mr. Lawrence, and animation directors Stephen Hillenburg, creator of SpongeBob SquarePants; Mitch Schauer, creator of The Angry Beavers; and Dan Povenmire and Jeff "Swampy" Marsh, co-creators of Phineas and Ferb. Most of the show's staff would regroup to work on Hillenburg's project, SpongeBob SquarePants, itself produced for the same network. A special, Rocko's Modern Life: Static Cling, was digitally released on Netflix on August 9, 2019.

== Premise ==
Rocko's Modern Life follows the surreal life of an easily frightened Australian immigrant wallaby named Rocko who encounters various dilemmas and situations regarding otherwise mundane aspects of life. His best friends are Heffer Wolfe, a fat and enthusiastic steer; Filburt, a neurotic turtle who often feels awkward or disturbed; and his faithful dog Spunky. Living next door to Rocko is a middle-aged couple, Ed Bighead, a cynical and cantankerous toad who despises Rocko, and his compassionate and friendlier wife, Bev Bighead. All of the characters in Rocko's Modern Life are anthropomorphic animals of varying species and sizes. Murray said that he matched the personalities of his characters to the various animals in the series to form a social caricature.

The series is set in a fictional town called O-Town. Many of the locations in the series contain the letter "O" in them; for example, O-Town and Conglom-O Corporation. When asked about the use of "O" in his show, Murray explained that the recurring use of the letter "O" in Rocko's Modern Life stemmed from his amusement with business names like "House-O-Paint" or "Ton-O-Noodles," which he felt symbolized how mass production and consumerism strip individuality from products while emphasizing quantity. He connected this idea to the American obsession with volume, which inspired the creation of the fictional Conglom-O Corporation. Since most of the show's residents worked there, Murray decided to name the setting O-Town. He also wanted the town to feel like a generic "anytown" in the United States and noted that he found humor in sports players who wore the number zero, which further influenced the naming choice.

From left to right: Rocko, Spunky, Heffer, Filburt, Ed Bighead, Bev Bighead

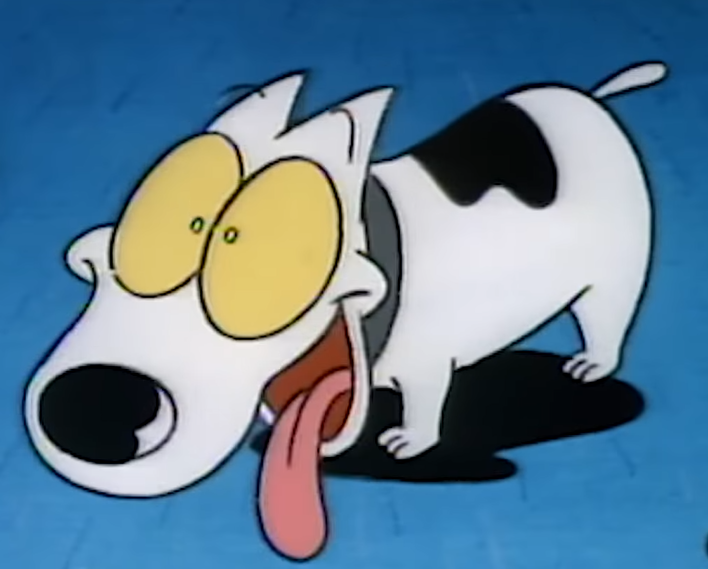

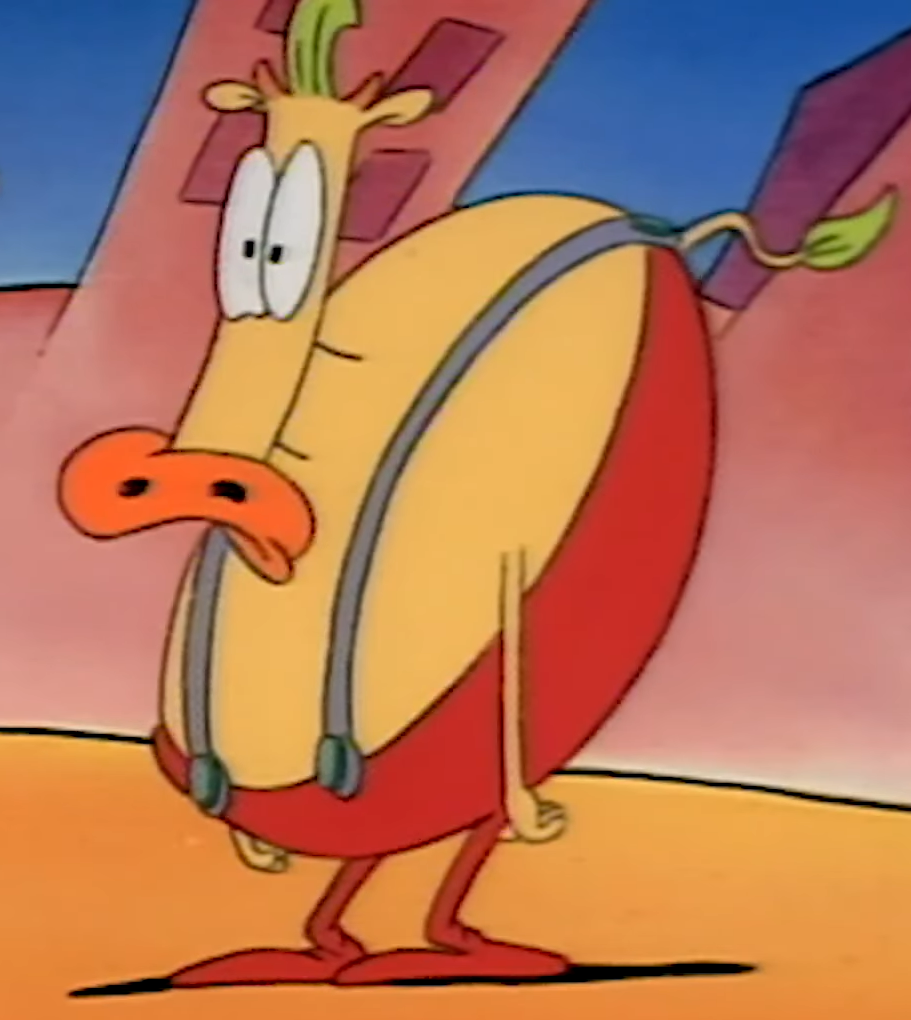

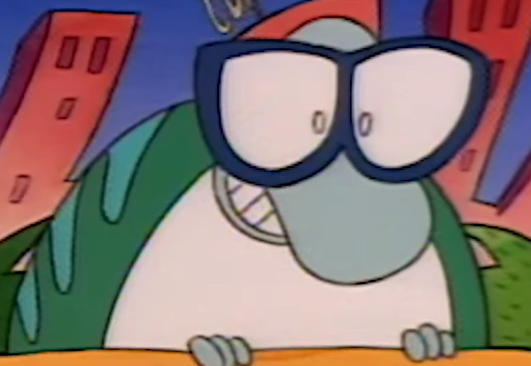

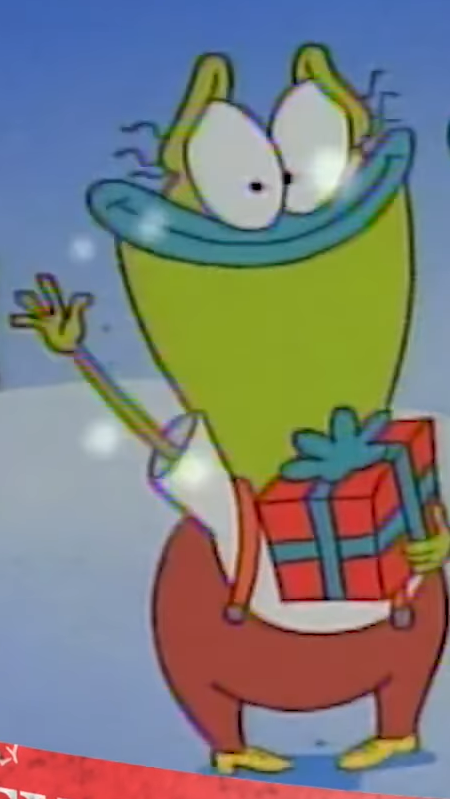

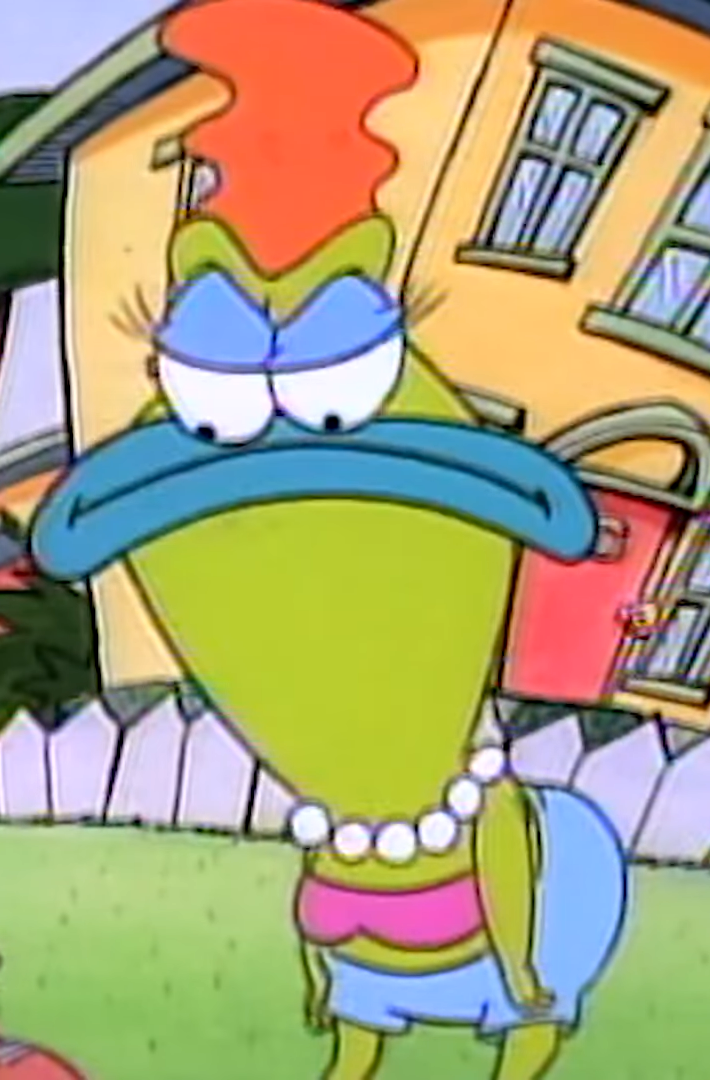

== Episodes ==
Season	Segments	Episodes	Originally released		
Season	Segments	Episodes	First released	Last released	Network
1	26	13	September 18, 1993	January 2, 1994	Nickelodeon
2	23	13	September 24, 1994	March 12, 1995	Nickelodeon
3	25	13	October 22, 1995	April 21, 1996	Nickelodeon
4	26	13	July 8, 1996	November 24, 1996	Nickelodeon
Static Cling			August 9, 2019		Netflix

== Development ==
=== Initial stages ===
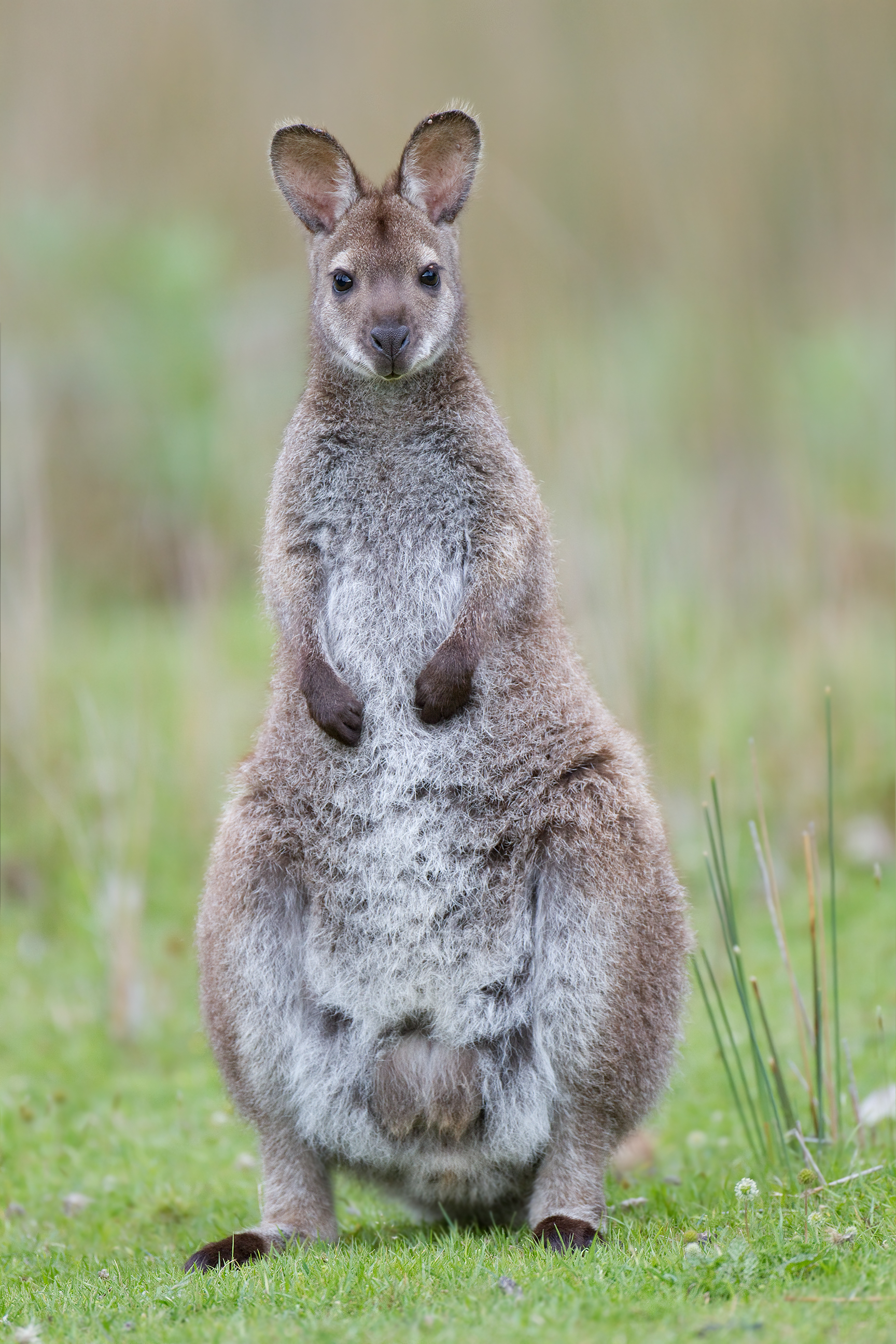
A red-necked wallaby in Bruny Island

In the early 1990s, Murray wanted funding for his independent short film My Dog Zero, selecting Nickelodeon to pre-buy television rights for the series. He presented a pencil test to Nickelodeon, which afterward became interested in buying and financing the show despite having no television experience. The industry was coming out of a "rough period" and Murray wanted to "shake things up a bit." He was approached by Nickelodeon to develop a series in 1991. Linda Simensky, a creative executive working for Nickelodeon, described the Nicktoons concept to Murray. He originally felt skeptical about creating a Nicktoon, as he disliked television cartoons, and also told her that he believed his concepts would not work well as an animated TV series. However, Simensky told him that Nicktoons differed from other cartoons. Murray then researched Nickelodeon at the library and found that the network's "attitude was different than regular TV" and that the cable network providers were "making their own rules." During that time, Nickelodeon, despite being a children's entertainment network, appealed to teens and college students with The Ren & Stimpy Show.

Murray developed the Rocko character after visiting a Bay Area zoo, where he came across a wallaby who seemed to be oblivious to the chaos around him. He further described the character as a 20-year-old wallaby resembling a "young anthropomorphic Woody Allen" who moved from home into a more surreal adult world. Murray also considered Rocko to have a sister named Magdalane, but it was scrapped because the pitch would function better if Rocko was "on his own." Around three or four months later, Murray forgot about the concept and was working on My Dog Zero when Simensky informed him that Nickelodeon wanted a pilot episode. Murray said he was glad he would get funding for My Dog Zero. On his website, he describes My Dog Zero as "that film that Linda Simensky saw which led me to Rocko." While "A Sucker for the Suck-O-Matic" was originally written as the pilot, Murray decided to produce "Trash-O-Madness" as the pilot episode after executives expressed concern that Heffer Wolfe was "too weird" for test audiences.

In terms of other characters, Heffer was conceived prior to Rocko's Modern Life in a 1989 MTV spot. The character was also based on Murray's childhood friend, as well as his own emotional experience of being adopted, which was later incorporated into the episode "Who's for Dinner" (1993). Additionally, Tom Kenny's 13-year-old nephew served as the inspiration for Heffer's distinctive voice. Filburt was created after Murray listened to Mr. Lawrence's audition tape; Lawrence had already been hired as an artist and director on the series. Impressed by the tape, Murray was pleased to discover that the voice belonged to Lawrence and subsequently cast him in the role. Ed and Bev Bighead were inspired by grouchy neighbors Murray had while growing up, described as "angry, difficult, and even borderline masochistic." Their conception also drew loosely on Australia's contemporary concerns regarding amphibian population crises. Additionally, Murray based Bev's distinctive bouffant hairstyle on his mother.

=== Pilot pitch ===
Murray's early concept art of Rocko, submitted to Linda Simensky in 1991

When the casting call for "Trash-O-Madness" began, voice actors were scarce in San Francisco, which led to Murray seeking out local performers who had not done voice acting work prior, including stand-up comedians. This was distinct from other animated series of the time. He attended a stand-up performance by Carlos Alazraqui and asked him afterward if he wanted to audition for the roles of Rocko and Spunky. Being impressed by Alazraqui's vocalizations of Spunky, Murray eventually hired him for the role. He would later audition Kenny from a stand-up performance, and Mr. Lawrence, a layout assistant in Games Animation, for the respective roles of Heffer Wolfe and Filburt, in which the latter recorded an audition tape that impressed Murray.

Murray wrote and produced the pilot episode, "Trash-O-Madness", at his studio in Saratoga, animating half of the episode. The production occurred entirely in the United States, with animation in Saratoga and processing in San Francisco. He believes that, due to his lack of experience with children, Rocko's Modern Life "skewed kind of older." In the original series pilot, Rocko was colored yellow. During the release of the first episode of Rocko's Modern Life, executives forced Murray to change it when a toy merchandising company informed Nickelodeon they were interested in marketing toys but did not want to market Rocko because "the color was too close to another major cartoon character that they were making a lot of money off of." Murray eventually changed Rocko's color to beige, but after the pilot aired, the company opted out of producing toys for the series, making the color change unnecessary. When the series was in development prior to the first episode's release, the series had the production title, The Rocko Show.

== Production ==
=== Overview ===
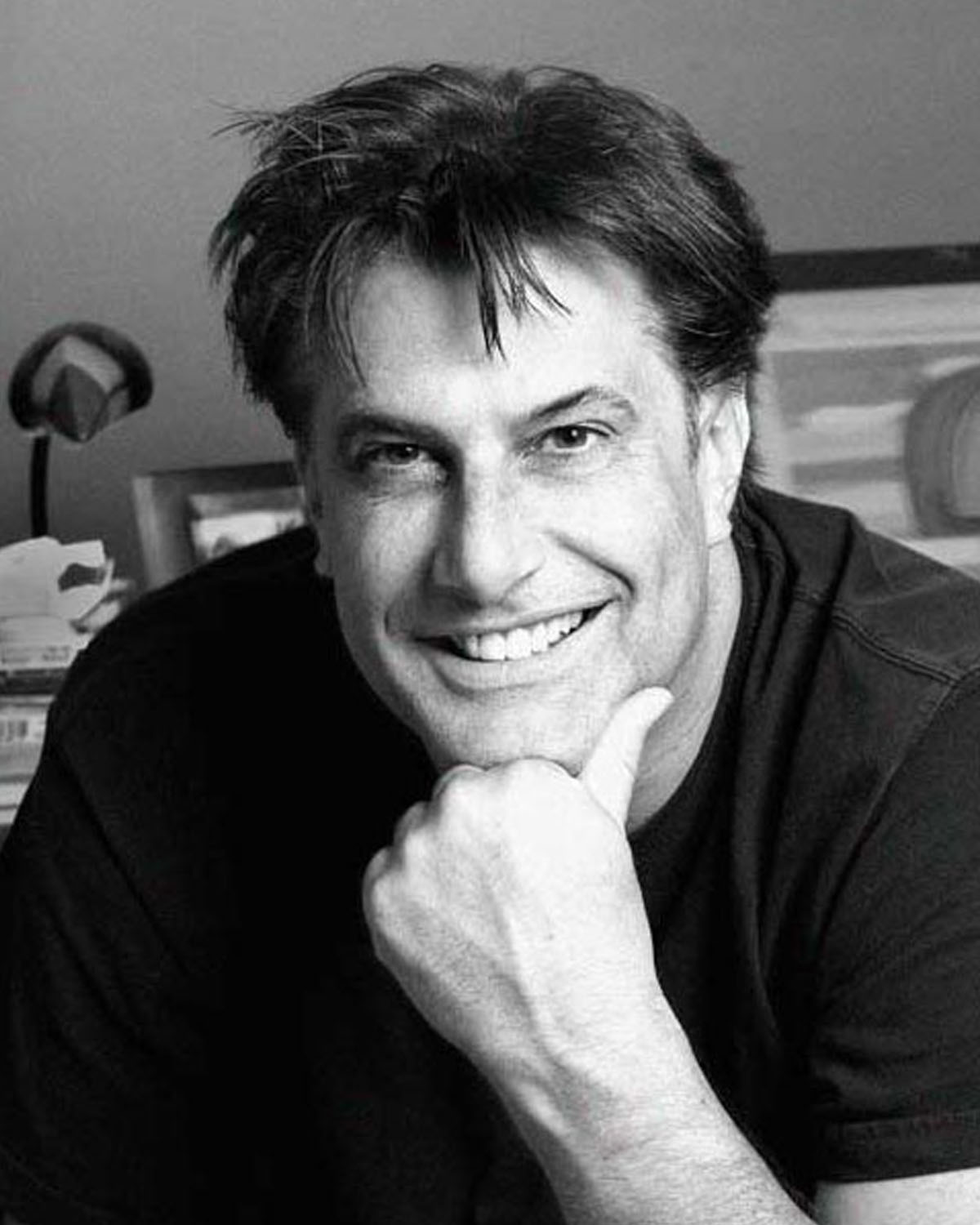
Joe Murray, the creator of Rocko's Modern Life

According to Murray, as Rocko's Modern Life was his first television series, he did not have prior experience or knowledge of the atmosphere of typical animation studios. He says that his experience in independent films initially led him to attempt to micromanage many details in the production, as the approach used for the production of television shows had "drive [him] crazy." This led him to allow other team members to manage aspects of the Rocko's Modern Life production, including director and later creative director Stephen Hillenburg, whom Murray met at an animation film festival where he was showing his three short films. Murray later hired Hillenburg as the director of Rocko's Modern Life, making it his first job in the animation business as director. Additionally, when Murray opened his studio in Los Angeles, California, he hired various animators who worked on The Simpsons, Cool World (1992), and Who Framed Roger Rabbit (1988). Rick Bentley of the Ventura County Star said that it was unusual for a cartoon creator to select a wallaby as a main character. Bentley also stated that the Rocko universe was influenced by "everything from Looney Tunes to underground comics." The crew of Rocko's Modern Life were fans of surreal humour in both animated and live-action form. Kenny cited Looney Tunes and SCTV as influences for the show, and also stated: "I'm sure if you asked Joe Murray or Mr. Lawrence or any of those guys, especially in terms of animation, the weirdest cartoons would, of course, be our favorites—those weird '30s Fleischer brothers Betty Boop cartoons and stuff like that."

In November 1992, two months before the production of season one of Rocko's Modern Life, Murray's first wife died by suicide. Murray had often blamed his wife's suicide on the show being picked up. He said, "It was always an awful connection because I look at Rocko as such a positive in my life." He felt that he had emotional and physical "unresolved issues" when he moved to Los Angeles, describing the experience as participating in a "marathon with [his] pants around [his] ankles." Murray initially believed that he would create one season, move back to the Bay Area, and "clean up the loose ends [he] had left hanging." When Nickelodeon approved of new seasons, he felt surprised by the offer; Nickelodeon renewed the series for its second season in December 1993. During the early stages of Rocko's Modern Life, Murray struggled to feel humorous while privately grieving his wife's death. Despite this, colleagues described him as notably selfless during production. According to Marsh, Murray was aware of his own emotional strain and sometimes withdrew in isolation. Nevertheless, he remained committed to shielding the creative team from external pressures, ensuring they were not blamed or interrupted, and consistently supported their work from behind the scenes.

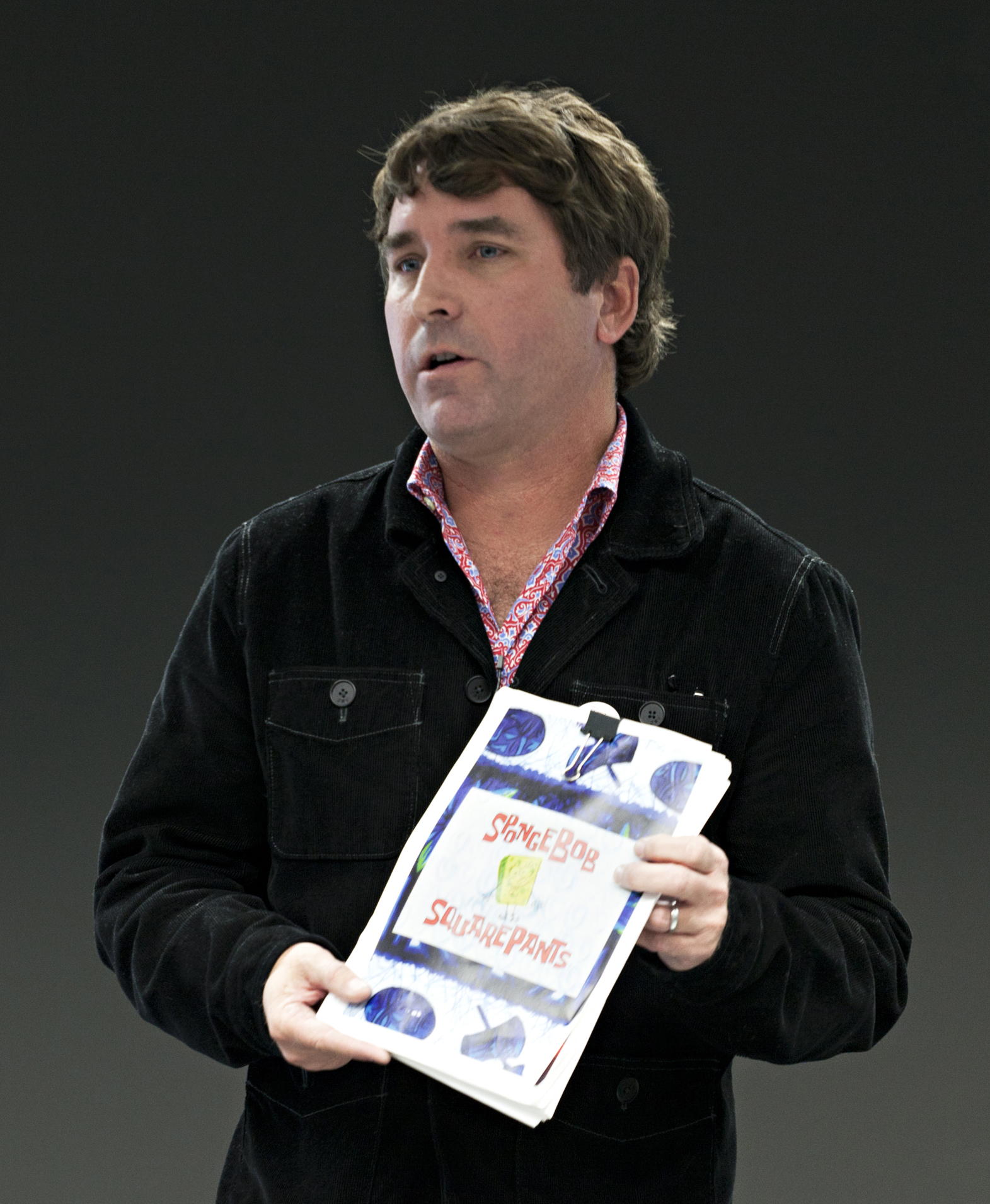
Stephen Hillenburg served as the series' director, marking a precursor to his later series SpongeBob SquarePants.

Producer Mary Harrington made the move from New York City to Los Angeles to set up Games Animation to produce Rocko's Modern Life, beginning production on the show in January 1993. Being Nickelodeon's first fully in-house animated production, Murray's Joe Murray Productions and Games Animation rented office space on Ventura Boulevard in the Studio City neighborhood of the San Fernando Valley region of Los Angeles, California. The production moved to a different office building on Vineland Avenue in Studio City, where executives did not share space with the creative team. Throughout production, Sunwoo Entertainment, and later Rough Draft Studios, assembled the animation. In the Studio City offices, Murray negotiated a contractual provision preventing unannounced visits from Nickelodeon representatives. He also kept a quotation from author Hunter S. Thompson displayed in his office that reflected the show's anti-authoritarian ethos: "The TV business is a long plastic hallway where thieves and pimps run free and good men die like dogs."

The working environment on the series differed significantly from that of The Ren & Stimpy Show, which was characterized by John Kricfalusi's more authoritative creative control and frequent conflicts with Nickelodeon over deadlines, budgets, and content. By contrast, Mr. Lawrence described Rocko's Modern Life as having a more open production culture that allowed more room for experimentation. Murray said that he opted to operate his studio similarly to the operation of his Saratoga, California studio, which he describes as "very relaxed." His cadre included many veterans who, according to him, described the experience as "the most fun they had ever had!" He, saying that the atmosphere was "not my doing," credited his team members for collectively contributing.

Referred to by Murray as the "Wild West", he described the daily atmosphere at the studio as "very loose," adding that the rules permitted all staff members to use the paging system to make announcements. He stated that one visitor compared the environment of the production studio to "preschool without supervision." Despite the relaxed nature of production, episodes were produced on time. Throughout production, according to Murray, 70 people in the United States and over 200 people in South Korea and Japan animated the series. Production practices on the series were frequently unconventional. When an episode exceeded its allotted runtime, writer Dan Povenmire, who learned knife-throwing in Alabama, would sometimes trim content by throwing a letter opener at a storyboard from behind his back; the scene it struck would be removed. Another crew member designed his office to function as a parody of a late-night talk show set, complete with canned applause, staged interviews, and pre-recorded laughter triggered in response to visitors' remarks.

After the series' third season, Murray handed the project to Hillenburg, performing most of the work for season four; Murray continued to manage the cartoon. He stated he would completely depart from production after season four, encouraging the network to continue production, but Nickelodeon eventually canceled the series. The motive was unclear, but it was likely the wholesome image Nickelodeon was beginning to develop and promote at the time. He described all 52 episodes as "top notch," and in his view, the quality of a television show may decline as production continues "when you are dealing with volume." Following his departure from Rocko's Modern Life, Murray took time away from work and entered therapy, acknowledging that his experience producing Rocko's Modern Life had a destabilizing personal impact. However, he reflected on the positive legacy of the series, noting that audience responses, including fan mail, helped him reconcile with the work and its effects. On his website, he said that "in some ways it succeeded and in some ways failed. All I know it developed its own flavor and an equally original legion of fans." In a 1997 interview, Murray said he thought that he could restart the series, but felt it would be difficult.

=== Writing ===
Many episodes are based on mundane tasks mixed with satire and absurdity. For example, "Trash-O-Madness" is based on environmental concerns.

The writers aimed to create stories that they describe as "strong" and "funny." Writers George Maestri and Martin Olson often presented ideas to Murray while eating hamburgers at Rocky's, a restaurant formerly located on Lankershim in the North Hollywood section of the San Fernando Valley. He took his team members on "writing trips" to places such as Rocky's, the La Brea Tar Pits, and the wilderness. If he liked the story premises, the writers produced full outlines from the premises, becoming Rocko's Modern Life episodes when both were approved by Murray and Nickelodeon. Maestri describes some stories as originating from "real life" and some originating from "thin air."

Murray stated that each episode of Rocko's Modern Life stemmed from the personal experiences of himself other directors and writers, including the season-two episode "I Have No Son". The episode based on Murray's frustrations with Nickelodeon and his father's past disapproval of his aspiration to become an artist. He said that he did not intend to use formulaic writing seen in other cartoons, desiring content that "broke new ground" and "did things that rode the edge," and that could be described as "unexpected." Murray did not hire writers with previous experience with writing cartoons; instead, he hired writers who worked outside of animation, including improv actors and comic artists. He said that if a story concept "ever smacked close to some formula idea that we had all seen before," it received immediate rejection.

At the start of its production, Murray received significant creative freedom from the network, and Jeff "Swampy" Marsh, a storyboard writer who went on to co-create Phineas and Ferb, says that writers of Rocko's Modern Life targeted both children and adults. He cites Rocky and Bullwinkle as an example of another series that contains references indecipherable by children and understood by adults. Aiming for a similar goal, Marsh described the process as "a hard job." According to him, when censors questioned proposed material, sometimes the team disagreed with the opinions, but agreed with the rationale of the censors. He said that "many parents [he knows]" told him that the team "succeeded in this endeavor" and that "many parents I know really enjoyed watching the show with their kids for just this reason."

John Pacenti said the series felt aimed at adults "for a children's cartoon." Marsh believes that the material written by Lawrence stands as an example of a "unique sense of humor." For instance, Marsh credits Lawrence with the "pineapple references," adding that Lawrence believed that pineapples seemed humorous. The staff drew upon Looney Tunes and the Fleischer cartoons to appeal to a wide demographic: having a certain adult sensibility but also enjoyed by kids.

=== Animation ===
Nickelodeon pushed Murray to create a strong female character on Rocko's Modern Life in response to their "top-heavy style." The character became Dr. Hutchison, a feline dentist with a hook for a hand.

Rocko's Modern Life's animation process has been described as similar to that of the output of Warner Bros. cartoons of the Golden Age, with a visually driven show heavy on humor, sight gags, and high-quality animation. Instead of a finished script, the animators usually received a three-page outline, requiring them to come up with a majority of the gags and dialogue. The animation team appreciated this approach, with storyboard artist Jeff Myers, formerly of The Simpsons, quoted as saying, "The script [at The Simpsons] was carved in stone. Here it's ... more of a challenge and a lot more fun when we're given a rough outline." Murray's animation lacked parallel lines and featured crooked architecture similar to various Chuck Jones cartoons. In an interview, he stated that his design style contributed to the show's "wonky bent feel."

Jean Prescott of the Sun Herald described the series as "squash-and-stretch", while Darryn King of Vanity Fair described the series' animation style as resembling "Salvador Dalí meets mid-century mod," characterized by zig-zagging forms, exaggerated angles, and a vivid, boisterous color palette. The series combined adult-oriented innuendo, squash-and-stretch animation techniques, and satirical storytelling, leading some commentators to describe it as a blend of Seinfeld's situational minimalism and The Ren & Stimpy Show's heightened cartoon absurdity. Episodes often began with highly mundane premises that were stretched into surreal narratives. For example, "Trash-O-Madness" centers on Rocko attempting to take out his garbage while being repeatedly threatened by an aggressive pit bull. The premise draws humor from an everyday task rendered unusually difficult, with the narrative sustained largely by its simplicity and repetition. This understated setup is then expanded through exaggerated Warner Bros. Cartoons-esque gags and slapstick humor.

When asked about the use of gross-out gags in a 1994 Great Falls Tribune article, Murray claimed that none of the gags are used for shock value, instead emphasizing the series to "explore the dark thing in life." A 1993 Houston Chronicle article described the series' setting as having a "reality that is 'squashed and stretched' into a twisted version of real life." Linda Simensky said that she asked the creators of Rocko's Modern Life about why the women in the series were drawn to be "top-heavy," the creators told her that they believed that drawing women "the traditional way" was easier. Simensky described the creators as "talented guys" who formed "a boy's club" and that "[he] pushed them to be funny, but a lot of their women are stereotypical." Throughout its production, Nickelodeon pushed Murray to use a strong female character on Rocko, eventually creating Dr. Hutchison, a feline dentist who "lost her hand to a crocodile patient."

=== Music ===
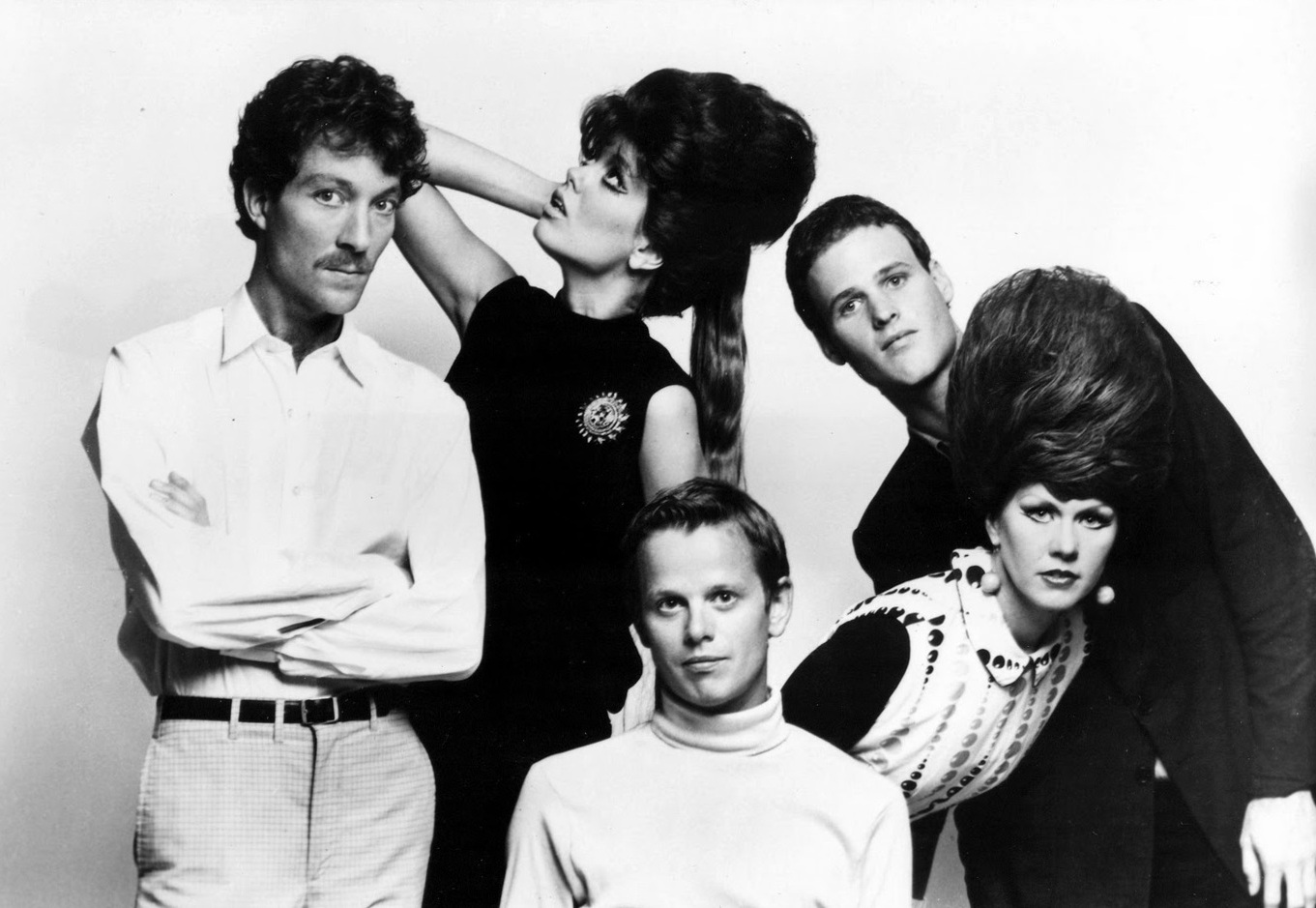
The B-52's (pictured in 1980) performed the theme song for Rocko's Modern Life.

Originally, Murray wanted Paul Sumares to perform the theme song since Sumares created most of the music for My Dog Zero, and wanted the same style exhibited in My Dog Zero in Rocko's Modern Life. However, Nickelodeon preferred a person with more experience. According to Sumares, Murray asked for Danny Elfman and felt stunned when Nickelodeon decided to honor his request by asking Elfman to perform. However, Elfman was booked for another project. Therefore, he decided to choose the B-52s, his second choice, instead of Elfman, stating that the difference between the stories "could just be a recollection conflict because Paul is a brilliant amazing guy." Murray also sought Alan Silvestri, but Viacom did not want to use Silvestri, as the organization preferred a band "slightly older kids could identify with." The B-52's version of the theme song was used onward from season two until its conclusion.

Pat Irwin, a veteran of many bands including the Raybeats and B-52s, spent five years as a music director on the series. Leading a six-piece combo on keyboard and guitar, Irwin brought together musicians such as trombonist Art Baron, drummer Kevin Norton, wind player Rob DeBellis, and bassist David Hofstra. Darryn King of Forbes described Irwin's composition as resembling surf music and lounge jazz, combined with Looney Tunes composer Carl Stalling's antic style. For example, King compares its musical composition to a blend of Iggy Pop's "Lust for Life" (1977) and Benny Goodman's "Sing Sing Sing" (1936). Irwin recalled that Murray explained to him the emphasis of the series having its own score to enhance its visual expression with a feeling of sensory overload, telling him to "climb the latter of anxiety". Furthermore, Irwin stated that each episode of the series was recorded and mixed in a day. On April 7, 2023, a soundtrack album compiled of various instrumental tracks from the series was released to streaming services. The album's deluxe edition was released on September 18 with eleven additional tracks, coinciding with the 30th anniversary of Rocko's Modern Life.

=== Censorship ===
The episode "Leap Frogs" was pulled from air by Nickelodeon for the show's run. It featured sexual humor, specifically where Bev attempts to seduce Rocko.

Rocko's Modern Life has been noted for its racy humor. Kelsea Stahler of Bustle described the series as containing sexual innuendos in plain sight while also presenting frequent visceral imagery, including depictions of despair, visible butt cracks, and recurring instances of vomit throughout its episodes. She noted that child audiences were routinely exposed to adult-themed situations through colorful and stylistically whimsical design. The series contained numerous adult innuendos, including Rocko's brief stint as a telephone operator implied to be a sex hotline in the season one episode "Canned" (1993), where an instruction sheet notes employees to "Be Hot, Be Naughty, and Be Courteous," while he flatly repeats "Oh baby" into the receiver, with the caller turning out to be Mrs. Bighead. The series' fictional restaurant, Chokey Chicken, is based on the phrase, "to choke the chicken", a slang term for masturbation. After the name had been intact in its first three seasons, someone reported the innuendo by the fourth season's production, resulting in its name change to Chewey Chicken.

Murray noted that the season one episode, "Leap Frogs" (1993), received "some complaints from some parents" due to its sexual humor, in which Bev attempts to seduce Rocko. This led to Nickelodeon removing the episode from air for the remainder of the show's run, although it returned in reruns and its DVD releases. Initially from "The Good, the Bad and the Wallaby" (1993), Heffer finds pleasure in a milking machine. His eyes were designed to shape like hearts during its climax before they were redesigned as stars. The scene, along with the following scene of Heffer saying goodbye to the milking machine, was removed before its premiere.

Murray has also reflected on the unexpectedly permissive production process. He stated that the tone of Rocko's Modern Life emerged in part from his willingness to pursue unconventional ideas without strong attachment to their acceptance. Murray explained that he initially expected many of his creative choices to be rejected, but instead found that Nickelodeon often approved them at each stage of development. As he recalled in an interview, proposals that he assumed would be declined were repeatedly greenlit, allowing the series to proceed further than anticipated in its content and tone. When Shout! Factory and Paramount announced a DVD retail release for the series, there was uncertainty whether Nickelodeon would allow them to release the series complete, containing sexual innuendos that were cut out for reruns. In the end, Shout! Factory and Paramount only received materials from sources edited for broadcast, meaning the episodes remained censored on the DVDs.

== Themes ==
A selection of scenes from the first season's episodes highlights typical situations in the series where Rocko tries to complete mundane tasks, only for them to spiral into absurd outcomes.

Rocko's Modern Life is generally described as an animated sitcom with elements of dark humor, satire, surreal humor, and slapstick. Alongside its episodic plots, with Rocko performing mundane tasks such as home repairs, grocery shopping, caring for his dog, retrieving an impounded car, quarreling with his neighbor, and undergoing an appendectomy, the series frequently incorporated themes of familial conflict, prejudice, and social tension. Heffer's adoptive parents are wolves who originally intended to eat him, while Ed Bighead disowns his son Ralph for pursuing a career in animation. Other story elements include interspecies prejudice, such as Heffer's grandfather expressing hostility toward wallabies and Dr. Hutchison's mother opposing a cat-turtle marriage. Murray has also stated that an episode in which Ed Bighead reconciles with his desire to become a clown functioned as an allegory for coming out of the closet. Writer Martin Olson described the series as reflecting childhood experience in broader terms, stating that it addressed "what children were actually going through, in essence: emerging into a very scary world, because the world is scary." The series also frequently satirizes corporate culture and institutional authority, often portraying them as exploitative or absurd. Beyond this, its satire extends to a broader critique of American excess and consumer behavior. The residents of O-Town are depicted as greedy, gluttonous, and driven by impulse, with even Rocko occasionally succumbing to consumerism or adopting authoritarian traits when placed in positions of power. Across the series, characters are routinely shown as vulnerable to personal vices, with consequences that underscore the instability and excess of the world they inhabit.

== Home media ==
The first home video release of the series in the United States was in 1995, when selected episodes were released on VHS by Sony Wonder. Sony Wonder used Rocko's Modern Life, alongside other television programs, as "leading brands" in order for the company to break into the market. Paramount Home Video re-released the tapes in 1997 and released one new tape in 1998. Before the official DVD releases, he said that he had not heard of any plans for a DVD release and that there are several bootleg DVD releases of the series sold on eBay. He commented, "[That rips] me off every time one is bought. But at least someone is trying to give Rocko fans what they want. Because Nickelodeon sure isn't doing it." Murray worked with his legal team to regain the rights, and an official DVD was released. In July 2008, Rocko's Modern Life was added to the iTunes Store as a part of the "Nick Rewind" collection, in four best-of volumes. The following month, Nickelodeon collaborated with CreateSpace, an Amazon-owned company, to release its older shows including Rocko's Modern Life on DVD for the first time, being sold exclusively online through best-of collections.

In March 2011, Shout! Factory announced that they would release the series' first season in an official box set in June. The two-disc set received relatively positive reviews, only receiving criticism for video quality and the lack of bonus features. Its second season was released in February 2012, with its third season following in July. In December 2012, Murray announced that due to strong DVD sales of the first three seasons, Shout! Factory would release Rocko's Modern Life: The Complete Series on DVD in February 2013, along with bonus material from the Rocko's Live event from October 2012. Murray also mentioned that its fourth season would be released individually on DVD soon after the complete series set was released. The fourth and final season was released in October 2013. All four seasons were available on Netflix until May 31, 2013. Since 2021, Rocko's Modern Life has been available for streaming on Paramount+.

== Reception ==
=== Ratings ===
Rocko's Modern Life debuted on September 18, 1993, with the series entering a Sunday morning time slot the following day. The lunatic nature of the series appealed not just to Nickelodeon's usual target of 6-to-11-year-olds, but to college students and adults who tuned in to The Ren & Stimpy Show. By January 31, 1994, the series' audience grew by 65% and was the second-highest rated cable program behind World Championship Wrestling on TBS. The series at the time was considered the network's highest-rated cartoon launch ever. There was a brief period in 1993 when the network received numerous complaints from members of a religious group that Ren & Stimpy and Rocko's Modern Life were too adult-oriented to be shown to kids on Sunday mornings. They wanted Nickelodeon to move the shows to a different time slot, but the programming change was not made. However, Rocko's Modern Life was later moved to a different time slot when new advertisers of Nickelodeon disapproved of the show, contributing to its decrease in ratings and cancellation.

=== Critical reception ===
Rocko's Modern Life received mixed-to-positive reviews from various publications. The Miami Herald ran an article about series that were "rais[ing] the standards for children's programming," singling out Rocko's Modern Life as "definitely worth a look." Jennifer Mangan of the Chicago Tribune likened the series to The Simpsons, noting the show as another example of adult animation that is "not for kids", comparing its use of "raw jokes and sight gags" to The Ren & Stimpy Show. Ted Drozdowski of The Boston Phoenix stated in the "Eye pleasers" article that he enjoyed Rocko's Modern Life because of "jovial excitement," "good-hearted outrage," "humanity," and "pushy animated characterizations." Writing for the New York Daily News, Kenneth M. Chanko described the series as "probably the most innovative and cutting-edge kids' show on TV." In a more negative perspective, Ken Tucker of Entertainment Weekly considered Rocko's Modern Life to be "a witless rip-off of Ren & Stimpy: mucus jokes without the redeeming surrealism or contempt for authority." Charles Solomon of the Los Angeles Times called the series "rock bottom" and a "tasteless attempt to capture the Ren & Stimpy audience," mostly expressing displeasure at the crass humor.

The series received more critical acclaim when viewed retrospectively. Brahna Siegelberg of Slate said that the most compelling aspect was that the show had "a really poignant critique of the materialist demands of American life." She added that she "realized that Rocko was really a show about how to navigate the adult world; one that could be appreciated by kids for its slapstick humor and absurdity, but had even more to say to young adults—like [her]." IGN called the show a prime example of the "sophisticated, intelligent brand of children's programming" during Nickelodeon's golden age. Rocko's Modern Life was described by Darryn King of Vanity Fair as "zany and occasionally obscene", but remained grounded in a blend of "social satire and deceptive sweetness", while Farah Barakat of Exclaim! described the series as providing the nostalgic comfort of an animated series while representative in its satirical humor. The A.V. Club called the show "one of the best series" from that era, praising the show's "impressive commitment to expressive character acting, well-drawn sight gags, and cartoony jokes that play with the form's slapstick strengths." New York compared the series' humor, in retrospect, to that of Office Space (1999) and praised its subversive, anti-corporate stories. Common Sense Media reviewer Emily Ashby gave Rocko's Modern Life four stars, stating that the series is "modern and funny, but edgy content isn't suitable for young kids."

=== Awards and nominations ===
In terms of accolades, Rocko's Modern Life received two wins and four nominations. In 1993, the series was nominated for Best Sound Editing - Sound Effects at the Golden Reel Awards. The following year, it won a Daytime Emmy Award for Outstanding Achievement in Film Sound Editing, and was also nominated for Outstanding Film Sound Editing. George Maestri was nominated for a CableACE Award twice for his writing on Rocko's Modern Life in 1995 and 1996. The series also won an Environmental Media Award in 1996 for the episode "Zanzibar!," a musical episode focusing on environmentalism, pollution, and deforestation. It was accepted by the episode's writers, Povenmire and Marsh, future creators of the Disney animated series Phineas and Ferb.

Year	Award	Category	Result
1993	Golden Reel Awards	Best Sound Editing - Sound Effects	Nominated
1994	Daytime Emmy Awards	Outstanding Film Sound Editing	Nominated
1994	Daytime Emmy Awards	Outstanding Achievement in Film Sound Editing	Won
1995	CableACE Award	Animated Programming, Special or Series	Nominated
1996	CableACE Award	Animated Programming, Special or Series	Nominated
1996	Environmental Media Awards	Children's Animated Television Program	Won

=== Legacy and impact ===
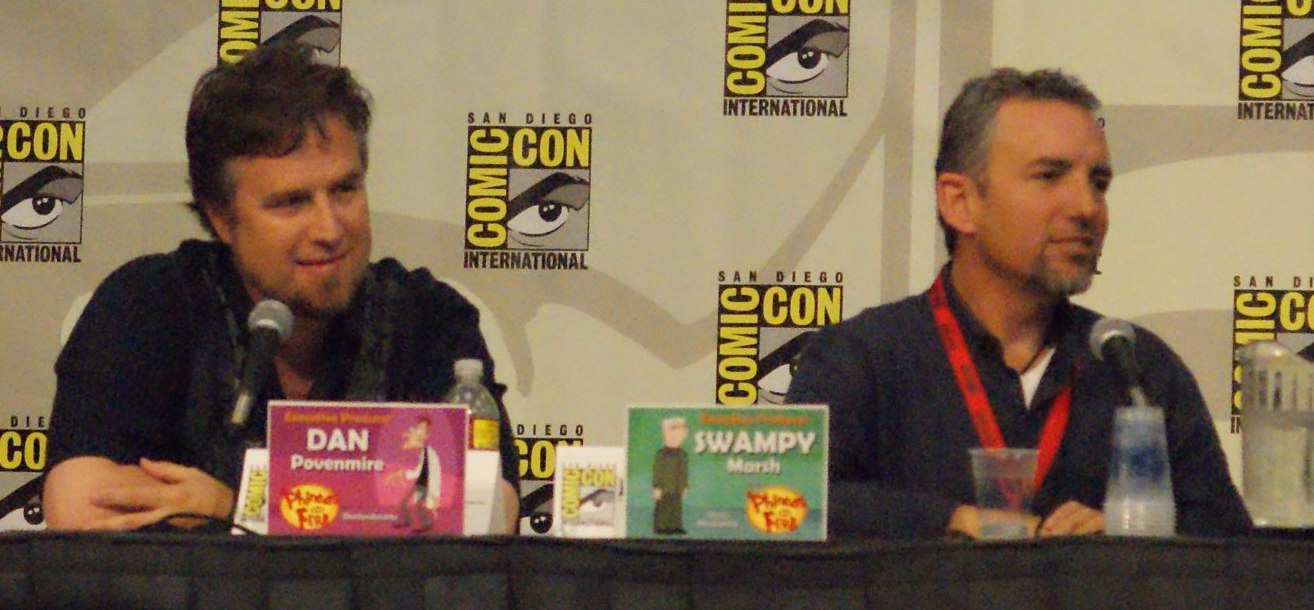
Several members who worked on Rocko's Modern Life went on to create their own projects, including Povenmire and Marsh with Phineas and Ferb

The fourth Nicktoon to debut, Rocko's Modern Life boasts a sizable cult fanbase. Kenny cited the show as vital in learning how to do voiceovers for animation. He recalled seeing Charlie Adler have a self-two-way conversation as the Bigheads without any edits as "dazzling." Kenny described the show's impact in an interview, saying, "Rocko's Modern Life was just one of those shows that were the first break for a lot of people who went on to do other stuff in the business."

Some members of the Rocko's Modern Life staff created other successful ventures. Mitch Schauer, the show's assistant storyboard artist, would later create The Angry Beavers, which premiered on Nickelodeon in 1997 and ended initially in 2001, with some episodes premiering in the US on Nicktoons in 2006. Hillenburg pitched SpongeBob SquarePants to Nickelodeon in 1997. Murray said of the pitch, "If it goes well, it'll be a blessing to us all." The network bought the show, which premiered in 1999, and it became a popular, critical, and financial success, and one of the biggest shows on Nick. Hillenburg stated that he "learned a great deal about writing and producing animation for TV" from his time on Rocko's Modern Life. Povenmire and Marsh went on to create Phineas and Ferb for Disney Channel, which became a ratings success and received numerous award nominations. Additionally, crew member Chris Savino went on to create The Loud House for Nickelodeon.

When Murray returned with a new animated series, Camp Lazlo on Cartoon Network in 2005, much of the former staff of Rocko's Modern Life joined him. He stated that "We always kept in touch and they told me to look them up if I ever did another project," adding that the crew already knew his sensibilities and had an extra decade's worth of experience. Alazraqui, who played Rocko, ended up playing the main character of Lazlo. Derek Drymon and Nick Jennings, both crew members, drew on its influence for future animated series they worked on.

== TV special ==
In September 2015, Nickelodeon stated that some of its old properties were being considered for revivals, involving Rocko's Modern Life in the process. In August 2016, Nickelodeon announced that they had greenlit a one-hour TV special, with Murray as executive producer. He revealed to Motherboard that in the special, Rocko would come back to O-Town after being in space for 20 years, and that it would focus on people's reliance on modern technology. In June 2017, it was announced that the title of the special would be Rocko's Modern Life: Static Cling and that it would air in 2018. They reconfirmed that the entire main cast and recurring cast would be reprising their roles, alongside new voice actor Steve Little and co-director Cosmo Segurson.

In May 2019, it was announced that Netflix had acquired the distribution rights to both Rocko's Modern Life: Static Cling and Invader Zim: Enter the Florpus, and the streaming service confirmed a day later that they would premiere in the summer of 2019. Two months later, it was confirmed alongside an exclusive clip by the Rocko's Modern Life official Instagram page and various news sources that the special would premiere on Netflix on August 9, 2019. It received critical acclaim from television critics for its perspective on the concept of change, transgender identity, and nostalgia, as well staying consistent with the series' satire and humor.

== Merchandise ==
In January 1994, Nickelodeon received ten "licensing partners" for merchandise for the series, including Nintendo, Marvel Comics, and Hardee's. In April 1994, Viacom New Media released one game based on the show, Rocko's Modern Life: Spunky's Dangerous Day, for the Super Nintendo Entertainment System. Initially, before the Nintendo game was developed, a computer game based on Rocko's adventures was being developed before the series even went into production. In December 2017, Boom! Studios published a comic book series based on the series. In the spring of 2019, it was revived under the name Rocko's Modern Life: Afterlife, based on Rocko, Heffer, and Filburt surviving in an apocalypse.

Rocko and Heffer both appear as playable characters in Nickelodeon Kart Racers 2: Grand Prix (2020), which also features two racetracks based on the show. Rocko appears as a playable character in Nickelodeon All-Star Brawl (2021) via downloadable content. He is also included alongside other Nickelodeon characters in a Nickelodeon-exclusive edition of the video game Smite. In 2026, Mondo released a limited-edition figure set from the series, featuring Rocko, Spunky, Heffer, Filburt, and the latter's pet bird Turdy. With only 1,200 sets printed, the set comes with multiple different expressions and hands to swap out.
