= Linda Simensky =

American television executive

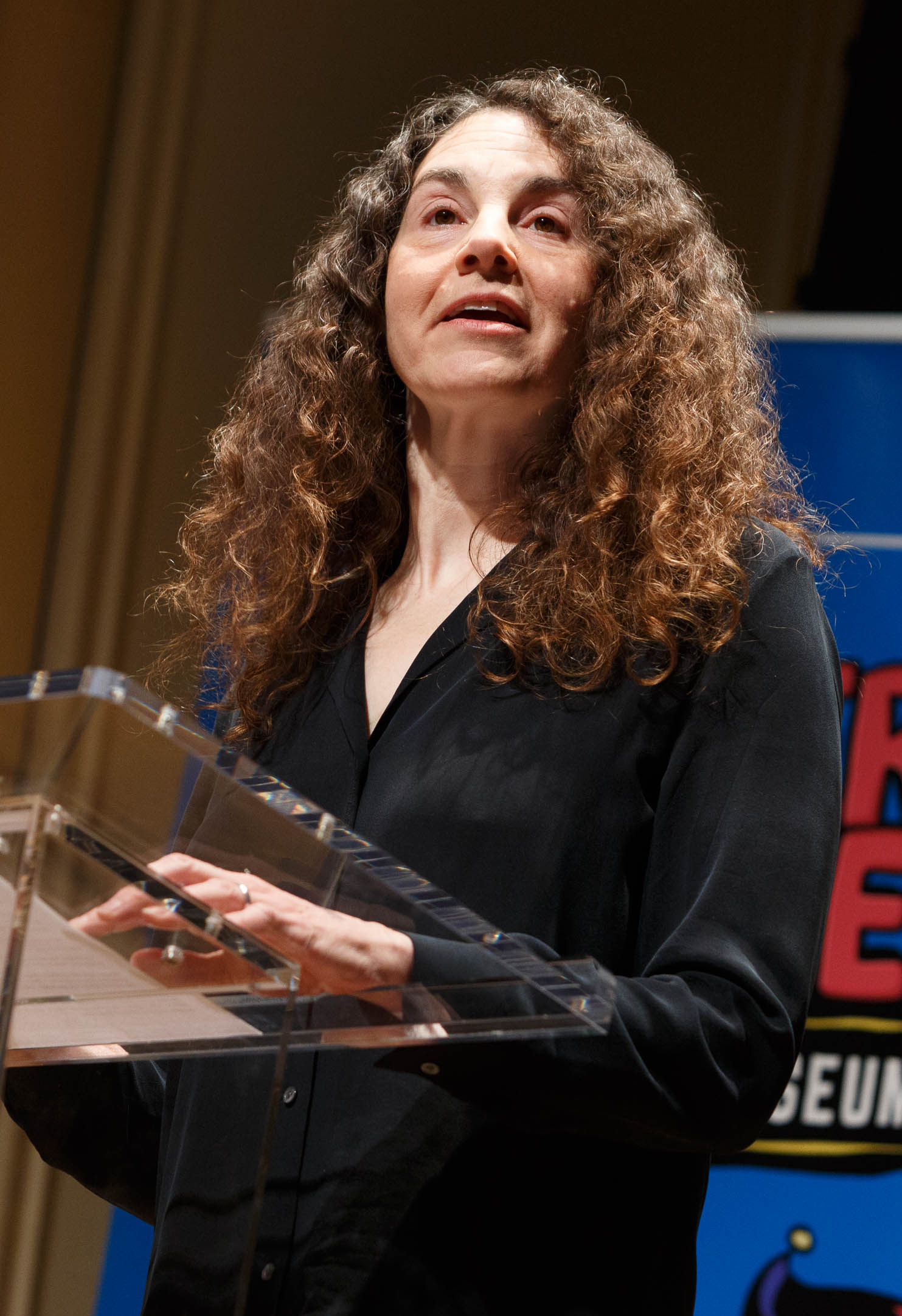
Simensky speaks in 2019

Linda Simensky is an American business executive. She served as a creative executive for Nickelodeon and Cartoon Network.

== Early life ==
Simensky grew up in Union, New Jersey and graduated from Union High School in 1981 and University of Pennsylvania in 1985.

== Career ==
Simensky received the June Foray Award in 2000.

On October 28, 2003, the Public Broadcasting Service appointed Simensky the position of senior director of children's programming.

In 2021, she joined Duolingo as head of animation and scripted content.

=== Views of gender in animation ===
In the 2008 book Art in Motion: Animation Aesthetics, Simensky stated that many male animators find difficulty in creating strong, positive female characters with substance that can serve as role models. When she questioned the creators of Rocko's Modern Life, one of the series which she produced, why the women in the series were invariably drawn to be well-endowed, she was told that the animators believed that drawing women "the traditional way" was easier. Simensky described the creators as "talented guys" who formed "a boy's club" and added that "we pushed them to be funny, but a lot of their women are stereotypical."

== Accolades ==
Simensky was named in Animation Magazine's "Top 10 Most Influential People in Animation" list in January 2002.
