= At the End of the Day (film) =

2018 American comedy film

- Theatrical film poster
- Directed by: Kevin O'Brien
- Written by: Phil Grimes; Kevin O'Brien
- Produced by: Kevin O'Brien; Teresa O'Brien
- Starring: Stephen Shane Martin; Danielle Sagona; Tom Nowicki; Christopher Cavalier; Susan Mulholland; Emily Davis
- Cinematography: Brandon D. Hyde
- Edited by: Kevin O'Brien
- Music by: Christoffer Franzén
- Release dates: June 16, 2018 (Dances With Films); February 26, 2019 (United States)
- Running time: 108 mins.
- Country: United States
- Language: English

At the End of the Day is a 2018 American LGBTQ+ dramedy film, directed by Kevin O'Brien, who co-wrote with Phil Grimes. The film stars Stephen Shane Martin, Tom Nowicki, Susan Mulholland, and Emily Davis. It premiered at Dances With Films in 2018, before its limited theatrical release throughout the United States the following year.

== Synopsis ==
A conservative professor at a Christian college finds himself in a gay support group to stop their launch of an LGBT homeless youth shelter in their small town.

== Cast ==
- Stephen Shane Martin as Dave Hopper
- Tom Nowicki as Gordon Woodman
- Susan Mulholland as Aunt Patty
- Christopher Cavalier as Nate
- Danielle Sagona as Alyssa
- Paul Saulo as Bruce
- Jace Greenwood as Mark
- Emily Davis as Erika
- Marvin LaViolette as Justin
- Bailey Gavulic as Taylor
- Melissa Malone as Gina

== Reception ==
On the review aggregator website Rotten Tomatoes, 100% of 5 critics' reviews are positive, with an average rating of 7.30/10.

Jennie Kermode at Eye for Film rated it 4/5 stars, lauding the lead actor: "[Stephen Shane] Martin delivers a finely-tuned performance that retains audience sympathy without sliding into apologism." Rich Cline at Shadows on the Wall also praised the film, stating: "Snappy, energetic filmmaking and a superb sense of irreverence add a sharp edge to this religious-themed comedy-drama."

Richard Propes of The Independent Critic cheered the filmmaker: "Whereas so many films along this theme tend to demonize one side or the other, Kevin O'Brien avoids such lazy storytelling while remaining true to his own central ideals and his belief that "love" and not "love the sinner, hate the sin" is the real answer." Douglas Davidson of Elements of Madness positively remarked: "In spite of its faults, At the End of the Day wins over its audience due to having its heart in the right place."

Stuart Monroe of Get On My Damn Level applauded the cast: "The overall performances are infused with a good deal of heart thanks to earnest emotion in source material drawn from O'Brien's real-life lessons and the experiences of members of the Zebra Coalition." Sam S. of Ain't It Cool News revered the film: "The acting was good, and the story was absolutely beautiful."

In a mixed review, Terry Mesnard of Gayly Dreadful took umbrage with the film's "straight savior" narrative: "I'm obviously being flippant, but the truth is that, on one hand, I'm annoyed that there's yet another movie that uses gay people as plot points for a straight man's self-actualization." Meanwhile, Mspacclown of The Avocado derided the film for its pedantic attempts at humor: "Moments of slapstick comedy and 'sassy' innuendo for the supporting cast fall flat."
