= George Maestri =

George Maestri is the President and Creative Director of the Los Angeles animation studio Rubber Bug, a writer, an animation producer for South Park, and a story writer for the animated television series Rocko's Modern Life.

Maestri was nominated for a CableACE Award for his Rocko's Modern Life writing.

Maestri has written several books on character animation and digital effects. He is also a contributing editor of Computer Graphics World magazine.

He is also an active member of lynda.com, teaching several animation-related techniques.

== Books ==
- Digital Character Animation 2, Volume I: Essential Techniques
- Digital Character Animation 3
