= My Three Suns =

- Futurama episode
- Episode no.: Season 1 Episode 7
- Directed by: Jeffrey Lynch; Kevin O'Brien
- Written by: J. Stewart Burns
- Production code: 1ACV07
- Original air date: May 4, 1999

Episode features
- Opening caption: Presented In Double Vision (Where Drunk)
- Opening cartoon: Grampy in "The Impractical Joker" by Fleischer Studios (1937)

Episode chronology
← Previous "A Fishful of Dollars"	Next → "A Big Piece of Garbage"
- Futurama season 1

"My Three Suns" is the seventh episode in the first season of the American animated television series Futurama. The episode originally aired on the Fox network in the United States on May 4, 1999. The plot focuses on Fry as he becomes emperor of an alien world, only to find himself in need of rescue when the previous emperor is discovered to be not really dead.

This episode features the first appearance of TV chef Elzar, and a cold opening in which Bender goes through an automatic "Bot Wash" facility, to the tune of Rose Royce's song "Car Wash", only to get rained on after exiting.

This episode was written by J. Stewart Burns and directed by Jeffrey Lynch and Kevin O'Brien.

== Plot ==
Hermes threatens to cut Bender's salary since Bender has no official duties at Planet Express. Inspired by the Neptunian TV chef Elzar, Bender decides to become the ship's cook. Professor Farnsworth then sends the crew, accompanied by Amy and Dr. Zoidberg, on a delivery to the planet Trisol. On the trip, Bender provides a meal of salted slug and salt water. After the ship lands, Fry is assigned the task of making the delivery across the desert under the heat of the planet's three suns. When he arrives at the Trisolian palace, he finds it empty. Thirsty from the salty meal and hot walk to the palace, Fry drinks from a bottle containing a clear liquid that is sitting on the throne. Armed Trisolians, who are revealed to be liquid-based organisms, storm the throne room, revealing that the bottle Fry drank actually contained their emperor.

Rather than being punished, Fry is declared the new emperor. The high priest informs Fry that as part of the coronation, Fry will have to recite the royal oath. The oath must be recited from memory, with the threat of death if a mistake is made. During the precoronation party, Leela informs Fry that all previous emperors were assassinated by their successors, and the average reign of a Trisolian emperor is only one week. When Fry takes no notice of her warning, Leela returns to the ship vowing she will no longer help Fry. A Trisolian then attempts to "drink" Fry, but is unsuccessful, as Fry is solid. At the coronation, Fry recites the oath properly, due to having written it on his arm, and is sworn in as Fry the Solid. As the suns set, the Trisolians begin to glow—including the previous emperor, who is still alive inside Fry's stomach. He demands that Fry be cut open and drained. Fry, Bender, Amy, and Dr. Zoidberg take refuge from the Trisolians in the throne room while they try to find a way to extract the emperor without killing Fry.

They decide that crying is the preferable method, but soon realize that Fry is too "macho" to cry properly. Needing help, Bender calls Leela on Fry's behalf, but gets an inconclusive response. Leela ultimately decides to help Fry in spite of her vow, and fights her way past Trisolian forces to reach the palace. Bender notices what is happening and lies to Fry by telling him that Leela is dead. This saddens Fry, and he begins crying. When Leela arrives, Fry tells Leela that he does need her help, and she begins beating Fry, causing him to weep in pain, crying out the emperor. Fry takes this as a sign that Leela still cares for him, and thanks her. The crew members take turns beating Fry until the emperor is out, who beats Fry, as well, while thanking him. With the emperor safely outside Fry's body, the crew is allowed to leave, while the emperor beats Fry with a chair.

== Broadcast and reception ==
In its initial airing, the episode received a Nielsen rating of 5.8/10, placing it 72nd among primetime shows for the week of May 3–9, 1999.

The A.V. Club gave the episode a B+, calling it "a fun episode that shows Fry at his best and worst."
