= Kevin O'Brien (director) =

American director and storyboard artist

Kevin O'Brien is an American director and storyboard artist. He is best known for his work on The Simpsons, where he has collaborated on 35 episodes in the storyboard department, and on Futurama, having worked on four episodes as a storyboard artist and one as a director ("My Three Suns"). He worked on Pixar films Ratatouille and WALL-E.

In 2005 he won an Annie Award for "Storyboarding in an Animated Feature Production" for The Incredibles.
