= List of awards and nominations received by Foster's Home for Imaginary Friends =

List of awards won by Foster's Home for Imaginary Friends
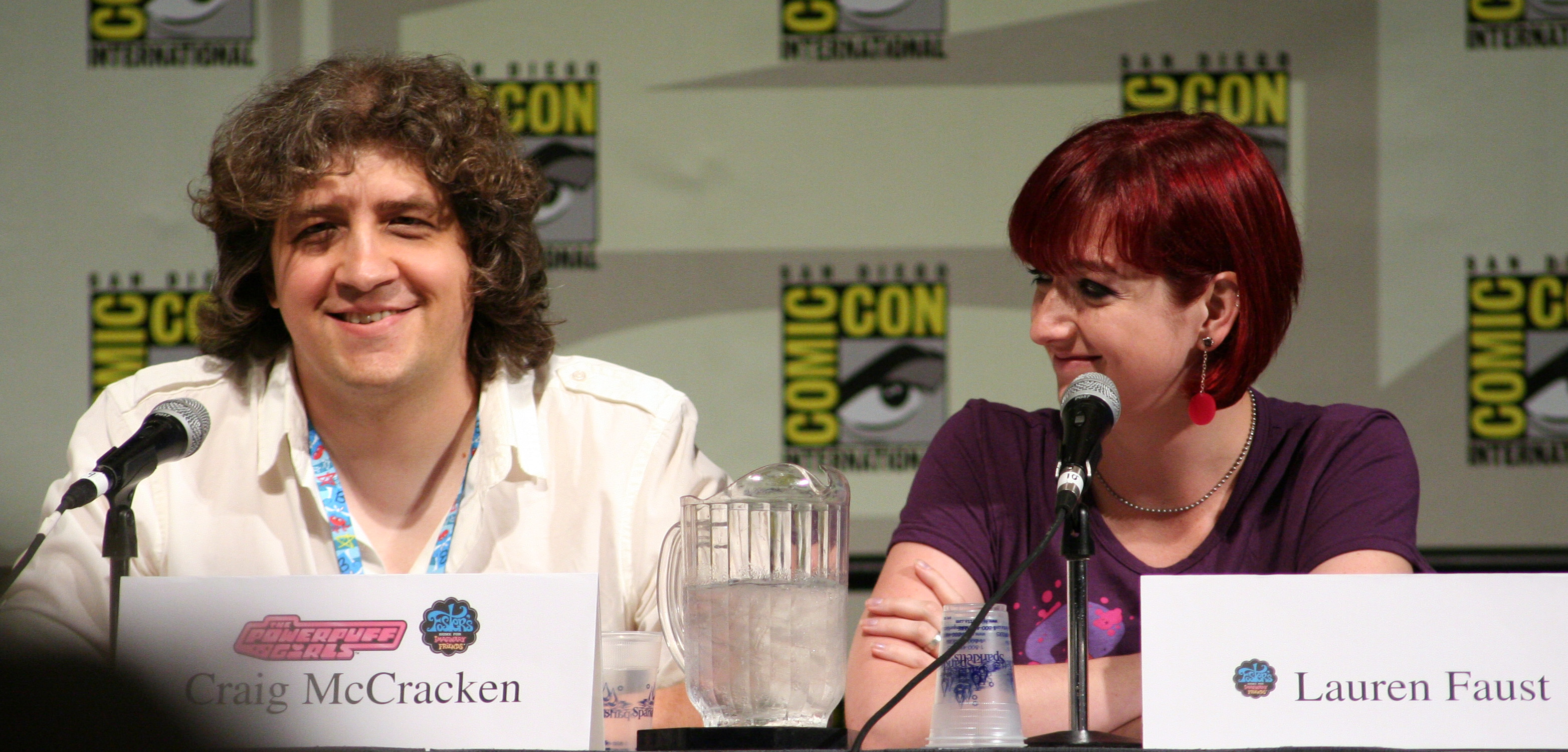
- Craig McCracken (left) and Lauren Faust (right), co-developers for Foster's Home for Imaginary Friends, at the 2008 Comic-Con International
Awards & Nominations
Award	Won	Nominated
Annie Awards	5	20
Emmy Awards	7	10
Ottawa International Animation Festival Awards	1	1
Pulcinella Awards	2	2
Television Critics Association Awards	0	1
- Total number of wins and nominations
Totals	15	34
- Footnotes

Foster's Home for Imaginary Friends (often abbreviated to Foster's) is an American animated television series created by Craig McCracken that ran from August 13, 2004, to May 3, 2009, on Cartoon Network. Throughout its run, it received critical acclaim and was nominated for 33 television and animation industry awards and won 12 of them. It received 20 Annie Award nominations, including Best Animated Television Production in 2006, of which it won 5. Two specials ("Good Wilt Hunting" and "Destination: Imagination") were nominated for the Primetime Emmy Award for "Outstanding Animated Program (For Programming One Hour or More)," which the latter won. Eight other nominations and six other wins were given to the series at other Emmy ceremonies.

At the 2005 Pulcinella Awards, Foster's Home for Imaginary Friends won the award for "Best TV Series for All Audiences" and the main character Bloo won "Best Character of the Year." It was nominated for the Television Critics Association Award for "Outstanding Achievement in Children's Programming" in 2006. The episode "Squeeze the Day" won the award for "Best Television Animation for Children" at the 2007 Ottawa International Animation Festival. The entertainment website IGN listed Foster's Home as the 85th greatest animated television program of all time. Zap2it placed Eduardo, one of the main characters from the series, number seven on their list of "Underrated of 2006."

== Annie Awards ==
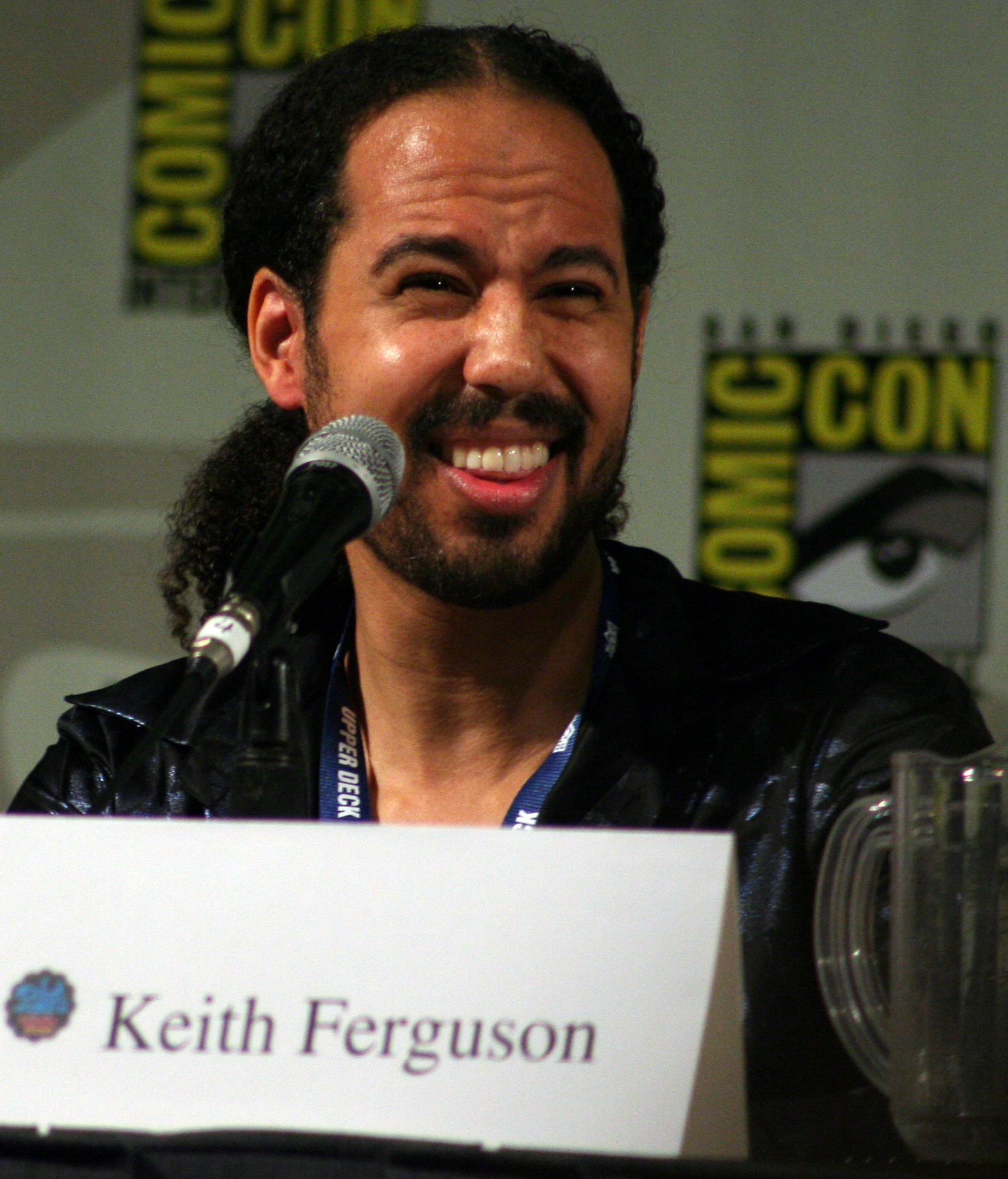
Keith Ferguson has been nominated for one Annie Award for his portrayal of Bloo

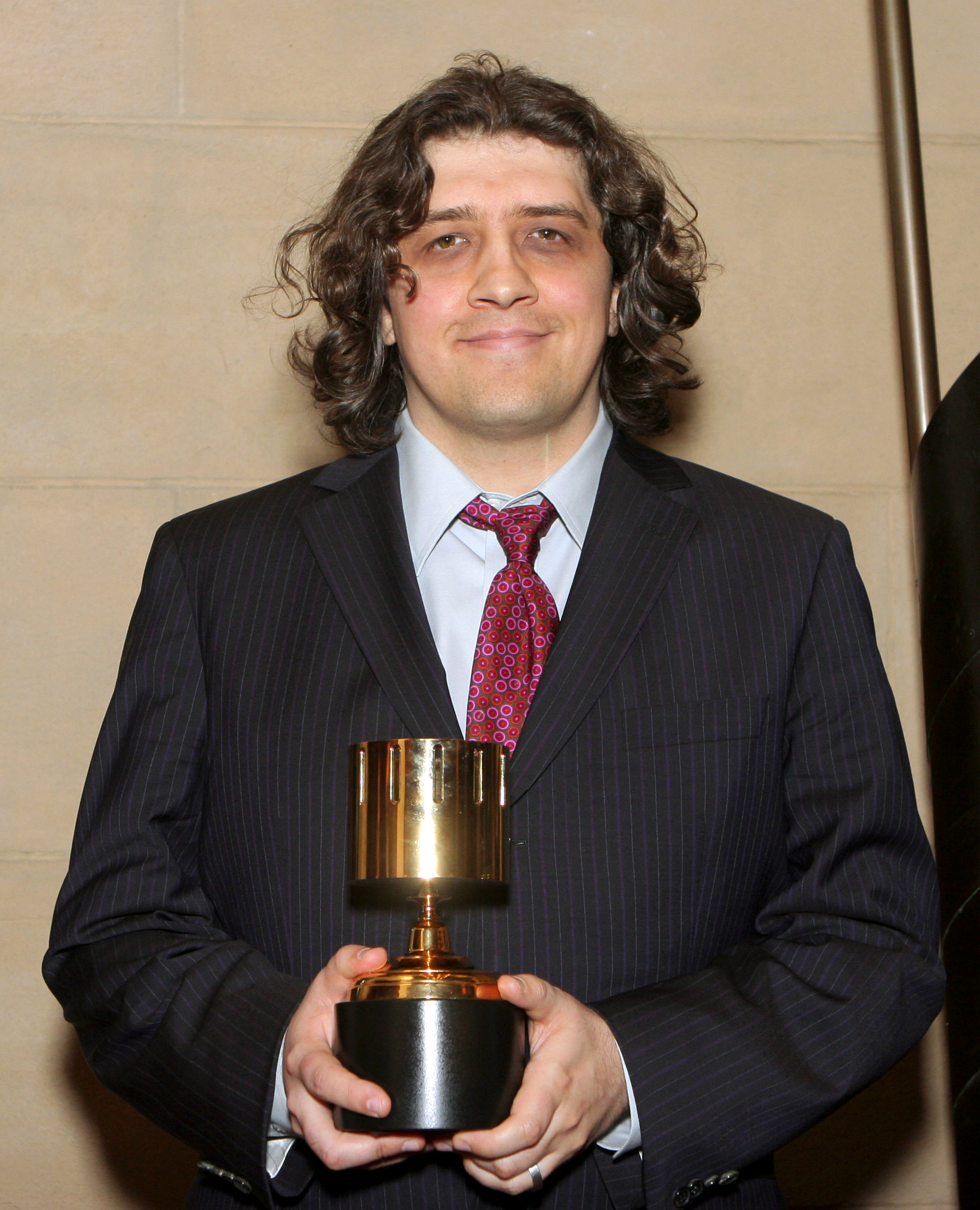
Craig McCracken holding the Annie Award for Best Animated TV Production, won by Foster's Home for Imaginary Friends in 2007.

The Annie Awards are award ceremonies honoring "excellence in the field of animation" and are presented by the International Animated Film Society. Foster's Home for Imaginary Friends has been nominated for 20 Annie Awards, winning 5.

Year	Category	Nominee	Episode	Result
2004	Best Animated Television Production	—	—	Nominated
2004	Character Design in an Animated Television Production	Lynne Naylor and Chris Reccardi	"House of Bloo's"	Nominated
2004	Directing in an Animated Television Production	Eric Pringle	"Who Let the Dogs In"	Nominated
2004	Writing in an Animated Television Production	Lauren Faust	"World Wide Wabbit"	Nominated
2005	Best Music in an Animated Television Production	James L. Venable; Jennifer Kes Remington	"Duchess of Wails"	Won
2005	Best Production Design in an Animated Television Production	Mike Moon Craig McCracken; Dave Dunnet; Martin Ansolabehere	"A Lost Claus"	Won
2005	Best Animated Television Production	—	—	Nominated
2005	Best Character Design in an Animated Television Production	Shannon Tindle	"Go Goo Go"	Nominated
2005	Best Directing in an Animated Television Production	Craig McCracken	"Duchess of Wails"	Nominated
2006	Best Animated Television Production	—	—	Won
2006	Best Music in an Animated Television Production	James L. Venable Jennifer Kes Remington	"One False Movie"	Won
2006	Best Production Design in an Animated Television Production	Martin Ansolabehere	"Good Wilt Hunting"	Won
2006	Best Directing in an Animated Television Production	Craig McCracken	"Bus the Two of Us"	Nominated
2006	Best Voice Acting in an Animated Television Production	Keith Ferguson (for voicing Bloo)	"Squeeze the Day"	Nominated
2007	Music in an Animated Television Production	James L. Venable Jennifer Kes Remington	"The Bloo Superdude and the Magic Potato of Power"	Nominated
2008	Best Animated Television Production Produced for Children	—	"Destination: Imagination"	Nominated
2008	Best Character Design in an Animated Television Production or Short Form	Ben Balistreri	"Mondo Coco"	Nominated
2008	Directing in an Animated Television Production or Short Form	Craig McCracken Rob Renzetti	"Destination: Imagination"	Nominated
2009	Production Design in a Television Production	Janice Kubo	—	Nominated
2009	Character Design in a Television Production	Ben Balistreri	—	Nominated

== Emmy Awards ==
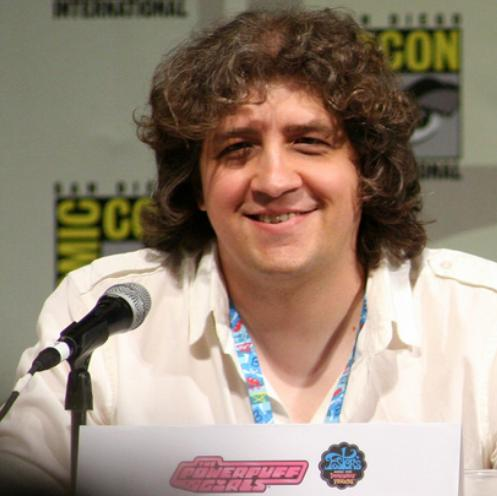
McCracken has been nominated for three Emmy Awards and won two.

Emmy Awards are the "[television] equivalent of the Oscars" and are awarded for excellence in television programs. The Emmys are presented by three sister organizations: Academy of Television Arts & Sciences, National Academy of Television Arts & Sciences, and International Academy of Television Arts & Sciences. Foster's has been nominated for ten Emmy Awards, winning seven.

Year	Category	Nominee(s)	Episode	Result
2005	Outstanding Individual Achievement in Animation	Ed Baker	"World Wide Wabbit"	Won
2005	Outstanding Individual Achievement in Animation	Craig McCracken	"House of Bloo's"	Won
2005	Outstanding Individual Achievement in Animation	Mike Moon	"House of Bloo's"	Won
2005	Outstanding Main Title Theme Music	James L. Venable	—	Nominated
2006	Outstanding Individual Achievement in Animation	Shannon Tindle	"Go Goo Go"	Won
2006	Outstanding Animated Program (for Programming Less Than One Hour)	Craig McCracken, Brian A. Miller, Lauren Faust, Jennifer Pelphrey, Vince Aniceto, Robert Alvarez, Eric Pringle	"Go Goo Go"	Nominated
2007	Outstanding Individual Achievement in Animation	Dave Dunnet	"Good Wilt Hunting"	Won
2007	Outstanding Animated Program (For Programming One Hour or More)	Craig McCracken, Brian A. Miller, Jennifer Pelphrey, Lauren Faust, Vince Aniceto, Michelle Papandrew, Darrick Bachman, Craig Lewis, Robert Alvarez, Eric Pringle, Robert Cullen	"Good Wilt Hunting"	Nominated
2008	Outstanding Individual Achievement In Animation	Ben Balistreri	"Mondo Coco"	Won
2009	Outstanding Animated Program (For Programming One Hour or More)	Craig McCracken, Brian Miller, Jennifer Pelphrey, Ryan Slater, Michelle Papandrew, Lauren Faust, Tim McKeon, Darrick Bachman, Ed Baker, Vaughn Tada, Alex Kirwan, Rob Renzetti, Robert Alvarez, Eric Pringle	"Destination: Imagination"	Won
