= List of Foster's Home for Imaginary Friends characters =

This is a list of fictional characters featured in the Cartoon Network animated television series Foster's Home for Imaginary Friends, created by Craig McCracken and aired on Cartoon Network from 2004 to 2009.

The central concept of the series is that imaginary friends created by children become real. When children grow up, the imaginary creations they abandon are sent to a dedicated care home.

The main character of the series is Bloo, an imaginary friend created by a boy named Mac. Bloo ends up in the titular home for creations of human imagination, run by the eccentric Madame Foster and her pedantic creation, Mr. Herriman. Other main characters in the series include the imaginary friends Wilt, Eduardo, and Coco, as well as Madame Foster's granddaughter, Frankie, who maintains order in the home. In some episodes, other recurring characters appear, such as the imaginary friends Cheese and Jackie Khones, the girl Goo, and Mac's brother, Terrence. Various other characters of lesser importance to the plot appear throughout the episodes. The characters of the series were generally well-received by critics.

== Main characters ==
=== Mac ===
Mac
- Foster's Home for Imaginary Friends character
- First appearance: "House of Bloo's" (2004)
- Last appearance: "Goodbye to Bloo" (2009)
- Created by: Craig McCracken
- Voiced by: Sean Marquette
- Age: 8

In-universe information
- Species: Human
- Gender: Male
- Family: Unnamed mother Terrence (older brother)
- Relatives: Bloo (imaginary friend)
- Nationality: American

Mac is Bloo's creator (having imagined him at the age of three) and Terrence's younger brother, a short boy with brown hair. He is a bright, shy, and creative eight-year-old who visits Foster's every day. He wears a red shirt over a white sweater, olive pants, black shoes, and carries a backpack. Mac is often the voice of reason among his friends when they are making decisions. He has the patience to endure Bloo's quirks as well as the eccentricities of other characters. However, his extremely good nature tends to make him somewhat naive. He is very attached to Bloo, and it is shown that his biggest fear is never seeing him again. Mac lives with his mother and his older brother, Terrence, who regularly bullies him.

Mac is also resourceful and intelligent, often using these traits in crises. From the episode Frankie My Dear onward, he develops a fascination with Frankie, falling in love with her. Despite his even temperament, Mac has one major flaw: he becomes hyperactive to the point of a rabid mania when he eats even a drop of sugar. Once in this state, he becomes impossible to control and will often become obsessed with seeking any other source of sugar.

He, alongside Bloo, made a cameo appearance in The Powerpuff Girls series finale, The Powerpuff Girls Rule!.

=== Bloo ===
Bloo
- Foster's Home for Imaginary Friends character
- First appearance: "House of Bloo's" (2004)
- Last appearance: "Goodbye to Bloo" (2009)
- Created by: Craig McCracken
- Voiced by: Keith Ferguson
- Age: 5

In-universe information
- Full name: Blooregard Q. Kazoo
- Nickname: Bloo
- Species: Imaginary Friend
- Gender: Male
- Relatives: Mac (creator)
- Home: Foster's Home for Imaginary Friends

Bloo (self-identified as Blooregard Q. Kazoo) is a blue imaginary friend and the main character of the series. He is an anthropomorphic blue domed cylinder and was created by Mac when he was three years old and was placed in Madame Foster's care home after an incident depicted in House of Bloo's. While Bloo initially tries to be kind and friendly in his new environment, starting from the episode The Trouble with Scribbles, he reveals his characteristic traits: he is often very immature, happy-go-lucky, self-centered, impulsive, and egotistical, with a knack for getting into trouble.

Bloo's selfishness is fully displayed in the episode Emancipation Complication, where he accidentally frees his friends but only does so to retrieve a battery for his Game Boy. Bloo is a failure who blames the world for his shortcomings; in episodes like Beat with a Schtick and The Sweet Stench of Success, he alienates all the home's residents.

He dislikes both Mr. Herriman and Frankie, occasionally making her life difficult. Bloo is obsessed with attracting the world's attention and dreams of working in show business, which he briefly achieves with limited success. Despite all this, he still has a good heart and apologizes for his wrongdoings. Bloo loves toys, especially paddle balls – even though he cannot make the ball hit the paddle, yet he excels at bowling.

=== Wilt ===
Wilt
- Foster's Home for Imaginary Friends character
- First appearance: "House of Bloo's" (2004)
- Last appearance: "Goodbye to Bloo" (2009)
- Created by: Craig McCracken
- Voiced by: Phil LaMarr

In-universe information
- Species: Imaginary Friend
- Gender: Male
- Relatives: Jordan Michaels (creator)
- Home: Foster's Home for Imaginary Friends

Wilt is a very tall, red, friendly, incredibly nice imaginary friend with only a right arm and a crooked left eye-stalk. However, in Good Wilt Hunting, it is discovered that he was not always this way; he was injured during a basketball game, leaving his left eye crushed and his left arm injured. He sleeps on the floor beneath a bunk bed shared by Eduardo and Bloo, who took his previous spot. Wilt has a particular passion for basketball, in which he demonstrates remarkable skill. This stems from being imagined by a basketball player named Jordan Michaels (a play on Michael Jordan's name).

Wilt exhibits good sportsmanship, which he applies to every part of his life. He is considered the nicest person at Foster's and is known for being excessively polite and apologetic, a nature often taken advantage of by the other imaginary friends and even some of the Foster's staff. He takes pride in being the "friend of the month", often taking in abandoned imaginary friends and bringing them to Madame Foster's home.

Wilt has a big heart, is calm and collected by nature, and rarely shows anger. According to the episode Room with a Feud, among himself and his roommates Coco and Eduardo, he has been in the house for the longest time.

He is named after basketball legend Wilt Chamberlain.

=== Eduardo ===
Eduardo
- Foster's Home for Imaginary Friends character
- First appearance: "House of Bloo's" (2004)
- Last appearance: "Goodbye to Bloo" (2009)
- Created by: Craig McCracken
- Voiced by: Tom Kenny

In-universe information
- Species: Imaginary Friend
- Gender: Male
- Relatives: Nina Valerosa (creator)
- Home: Foster's Home for Imaginary Friends

Eduardo is a big, furry, purple, Spanish-speaking imaginary friend who resembles a mixture of a minotaur, a hodag, and one of the beasts from Maurice Sendak's storybook Where the Wild Things Are, with horns, a snout, a pointy demon-like tail, and large teeth. He wears gray pants. Despite his large and imposing size, overwhelming strength, and menacing appearance, Eduardo is usually docile, timid, sensitive, and scared of almost everything, most of all spiders. However, he can be ferocious if angered or when danger befalls one or more of his friends, as demonstrated in the episode Eddie Monster, where he overcomes the scariest imaginary creations of teenagers.

Eduardo has a fondness for potatoes, dogs, and his cuddly toys. He once had a puppy named Chuy ("Chewie"), who turned out to be an imaginary dog with the ability to speak and bite with ferocious playfulness. He also enjoys the preschool show Lauren Is Explorin', a parody of Dora the Explorer. His creator, Nina Valerosa, now a police officer for the city, created him to protect her in a rough neighborhood. Eduardo shares a room with Wilt, Coco, and Bloo, and sleeps in a bunk bed (on the top). In his room, he keeps a toy box, a dollhouse, and his own piggy bank.

=== Coco ===
Coco
- Foster's Home for Imaginary Friends character
- First appearance: "House of Bloo's" (2004)
- Last appearance: "Goodbye to Bloo" (2009)
- Created by: Craig McCracken
- Voiced by: Candi Milo

In-universe information
- Species: Imaginary Friend
- Gender: Female
- Home: Foster's Home for Imaginary Friends

Coco is a bird-like imaginary friend who has a palm tree-shaped head (with hair mimicking tree fronds), a crooked red beak, and an airplane-shaped body. Despite her shape, she can neither fly long distances nor hover for very long. Coco is only able to say her name, and she does so at various speeds and with different emphases. She also has the ability to lay colorful plastic eggs containing a plethora of objects of her choosing. Mac, Bloo, Eduardo, Frankie, Wilt, and others usually understand her when she speaks, and often translate for her.

Despite her appearance and quirky behavior, she can demonstrate great intelligence, principles, ethics, discipline (in getting various jobs), and kindness. Coco exhibits eccentric behavior; for instance, in the episode Partying Is Such Sweet Soiree, she falls in love with a lamp. However, she generally adapts quickly to her surroundings, taking on various activities outside the home. In the episode Mondo Coco, she even achieves a meteoric career.

No one knows who her creator is as she was found on a South Pacific island by two scientists named Adam and Douglas, who brought her to Foster's Home for Imaginary Friends. Coco shares a room with Wilt, Eduardo, and Bloo, sleeping in a nest.

=== Frankie Foster ===
Frankie Foster
- Foster's Home for Imaginary Friends character
- First appearance: "House of Bloo's" (2004)
- Last appearance: "Goodbye to Bloo" (2009)
- Created by: Craig McCracken
- Voiced by: Grey DeLisle-Griffin
- Age: 22

In-universe information
- Full name: Frances Foster
- Nicknames: Frankie; Frances; Miss Frances
- Species: Human
- Gender: Female
- Relatives: Madame Foster (grandmother)
- Home: Foster's Home for Imaginary Friends
- Nationality: American
- Birthday: July 25, 1984

Frances "Frankie" Foster is Madame Foster's 22-year-old granddaughter, addressed as "Miss Frances" by Mr. Herriman. Frankie has red hair tied in a high ponytail and typically wears a white T-shirt, a green zip-up hoodie with a hood, a denim skirt, orange socks, and sneakers. Her parents are never seen in the series. Frankie is the primary caregiver at Foster's, keeping up the house's cooking and cleaning and helping keep everything in order. Despite Mr. Herriman's fussiness and fixation with rules and cleanliness, she is usually very friendly, outgoing, and laid-back. Raised by Madame Foster, she respects her deeply.

Frankie is friends with most of the imaginary friends at Foster's (particularly Wilt, Eduardo, Coco, and Bloo) and can be described as a protective big sister to them; but sometimes, she is unsuccessful in her attempts to remain professional and gets loudly annoyed at Bloo, Mac, Cheese, Madame Foster, Mr. Herriman, and the other house residents regularly due to her heavy workload, the strict rules imposed by Mr. Herriman, and the antics of Bloo. She is sometimes humiliated by the residents of the house but strives to treat them with compassion and care.

Although of average appearance, Frankie attracts romantic attention from various men. In her free time, she enjoys watching the soap opera Loved and Unloved and listening to punk rock. She also has an obsession with her grandmother's cookies.

According to her driver's license in Bus the Two of Us, she was born on July 25, 1984.

=== Mr. Herriman ===
Mr. Herriman
- Foster's Home for Imaginary Friends character
- First appearance: "House of Bloo's" (2004)
- Last appearance: "Goodbye to Bloo" (2009)
- Created by: Craig McCracken
- Voiced by: Tom Kane

In-universe information
- Full name: Mr. H. Herriman
- Species: Imaginary Friend
- Gender: Male
- Relatives: Madame Foster (creator)
- Home: Foster's Home for Imaginary Friends

Mr. H. Herriman is a gray and white, large, elderly, anthropomorphic, lop-eared and rabbit-like imaginary friend with an English accent imagined by Madame Foster. He wears a tailcoat, white gloves, a top hat, and a monocle, being an embodiment of the Edwardian era. He is in charge of the house and is extremely strict about house rules, observably putting the rules before common sense and everyday ethics, as seen in Destination: Imagination when he sticks to the rule written on the chained up toy box of never letting the imaginary friend who is trapped in there out despite what would happen to him if he did not. As president, he receives a modest salary.

He is often found punishing house residents (invariably, usually Bloo) for various rule violations. It was revealed in "Busted" that Mr. Herriman is so hard on Bloo because he feels that, given that he is allowed to stay at Foster's even though he still has an owner, he has already broken one of the main house rules. He is especially authoritarian toward Frankie, burdening her with numerous rules and the responsibility of keeping the entire house spotless. He is extremely fond of his creator, Madame Foster, harboring great respect and loyalty to her, even at her most prominent levels of unabashed pep and energy. In Madame Foster's youth, Herriman created a lullaby named Funny Bunny, which causes him great embarrassment today.

He has a fear of dogs (due to the fact that dogs are the natural predators of rabbits) and is easily scared out of his wits whenever he comes across one. He also has a rabbit's stereotypical obsession with carrots and will do anything to have them, as demonstrated in Crime After Crime.

=== Madame Foster ===
Madame Foster
- Foster's Home for Imaginary Friends character
- First appearance: "House of Bloo's" (2004)
- Last appearance: "Goodbye to Bloo" (2009)
- Created by: Craig McCracken
- Voiced by: Candi Milo

In-universe information
- Full name: Madame F. Foster
- Species: Human
- Gender: Female
- Relatives: Frankie Foster (granddaughter); Mr. Herriman (imaginary friend)
- Home: Foster's Home for Imaginary Friends
- Nationality: American

Madame F. Foster is the founder of Foster's and Frankie's grandmother. She is short, with gray hair styled in a bun and glasses perched on her nose. Her attire consists of a green sweater, a purple skirt, and small black shoes. Despite her age, she has childlike, boundless energy and enjoys herself to the fullest. She loves wild house parties. Her imaginary friend is Mr. Herriman, whom she imagined when she was a child and never gave up, and is the only one who can control him; like Mac, she never intended to give her imaginary friend up, and like Bloo, Madame Foster occasionally becomes hyperactive and mischievous with a disdain for the rules. However, there are times she is shown to be the wisdom of the house. She is widely respected by the imaginary friends.

== Recurring characters ==
Duchess
- Foster's Home for Imaginary Friends character
- First appearance: "House of Bloo's" (2004)
- Last appearance: "The Bloo Superdude and the Great Creator of Everything's Awesome Ceremony of Fun That He's Not Invited To" (2009)
- Created by: Craig McCracken
- Voiced by: Grey DeLisle-Griffin

In-universe information
- Species: Imaginary Friend
- Gender: Female
- Home: Foster's Home for Imaginary Friends

- Duchess (voiced by Grey DeLisle) is a two-dimensional high-maintenance pedigree imaginary friend who is pompous, ugly, rude, arrogant, selfish, and lazy, disliked by the other residents. She has yellow skin and a short trunk. Duchess wears a white turban with a red gemstone, large green earrings, a black-and-white dress, a tail, black-and-green striped tights, black high-heeled shoes, and a medallion. She considers herself superior to all the other imaginary friends, is extremely negative towards everyone, and never says anything nice. Whenever Duchess turns on the spot, her entire body pivots like a sheet of paper being flipped, revealing that she is only two-dimensional both mentally and physically. She is the only flat imagined friend in the house. Her full name is "Her Royal Duchess Diamond Persnickety the First, Last, and Only," which she demands she be introduced as to potential adopters. She speaks with a German accent. Details about Duchess's life before moving to Foster's or who created her remain a mystery since neither Duchess nor her creator were even shown at the reunion in Good Wilt Hunting.
- Mac's mother (voiced by Grey DeLisle) is the mother of Terrence and Mac who is rarely shown but often mentioned. She tells her youngest son Mac to give up Bloo because she gave up her imaginary friend at his age. She seems completely unaware that Mac visits Bloo at Foster's everyday.
- Goo Goo Ga Ga (voiced by Grey DeLisle) is a hyperactive, happy-go-lucky, overly imaginative and talkative African-American girl who first appeared in Go Goo Go. Her parents allowed her to name herself when she was a baby resulting in the full name "Goo Goo Ga Ga." She has black pigtails, dark skin, blue overalls with suspenders, a rainbow-striped shirt, and tall yellow boots. Goo enjoys playing games such as Checkers and Truth or Dare, but she does not know how to play and Mac is the only one who notices. In her first appearance she constantly created imaginary friends because she had no real friends because of her eccentricity. She finally stopped making new friends and undoes them after Mac told her to get to know the ones she had made already. However, she has still created a few by mistake or to help on rare occasions. She is also shown to be the creator of and friends with Cheese, as both of them get along because of their odd doings. Despite appearing older than Mac, her exact age has never been stated.

Terrence
- Foster's Home for Imaginary Friends character
- First appearance: "House of Bloo's" (2004)
- Last appearance: "Goodbye to Bloo" (2009)
- Created by: Craig McCracken
- Voiced by: Tara Strong
- Age: 13

In-universe information
- Species: Human
- Gender: Male
- Family: Unnamed mother Mac (younger brother)
- Relatives: Red (imaginary friend)
- Nationality: American

- Terrence (voiced by Tara Strong) is Mac's sadistic older brother and the recurring villain of the series. He lives with Mac and their mother in the same apartment. He has black hair and acne on his face, typically dressed in a maroon hoodie, a gray T-shirt, pants, and white shoes. He enjoys bullying Mac and devising various schemes to make Mac's life hard and miserable. His stupidity always gets the better of him, making him easily outsmarted by Mac or Bloo.

Cheese
- Foster's Home for Imaginary Friends character
- First appearance: "Mac Daddy" (2005)
- Last appearance: "Goodbye to Bloo" (2009)
- Created by: Craig McCracken
- Voiced by: Candi Milo

In-universe information
- Species: Imaginary Friend
- Gender: Male
- Relatives: Louise (creator)
- Home: Foster's Home for Imaginary Friends

- Cheese (voiced by Candi Milo) is a simple, dimwitted, light yellow imaginary friend who debuted in Mac Daddy. Cheese was thought to be an imaginary friend accidentally created by Mac, but was actually created by Mac's neighbor Louise. Although not a resident of Foster's Home, he visits frequently. He appears to be a nuisance and dimwitted, often saying incoherent or non-sequitur phrases, and breaking into sudden bouts of screaming when frightened or when he does not get his way. Cheese likes goldfish crackers, cereal, juice, chocolate milk (although he is lactose-intolerant), et cetera. He is prone to flatulence. In the series finale Goodbye to Bloo, he becomes the newest resident at Foster's due to Louise moving to an apartment that doesn't allow imaginary friends, much to the other residents' horror.

== Recurring imaginary friends ==
- Fluffer Nutter (voiced by Grey DeLisle) – A small pink squirrel-like friend.
- Bloppy Pants (voiced by Jeff Bennett) – A shy and nervous grey tabby cat-like friend.
- Yogi Boo Boo (voiced by Tom Kenny) – A tall green giraffe-like friend who speaks with an Indian accent. His name is a parody of Yogi Bear and Boo-Boo Bear.
- Billy the Squid (voiced by Tom Kenny) – A pink octopus/alien-like friend with 3 horn-like appendages on his head.
- Sunset Junction (voiced by Keith Ferguson) – A tall navy blue bear-like friend with carpet-like fur wearing a woolen scarf.
- Jackie Khones (voiced by Phil LaMarr) – A tiny green one-eyed stick figure-like friend. Despite his tiny size, he speaks in a deep voice. He often publicly reveals things others wish to keep secret. His favorite food is sandwiches, and he frequently bargains or resorts to trickery to obtain them. Jackie and Fluffer Nutter are dating.
- Handy (voiced by Keith Ferguson) – A friend who appears as an animate baseball mitt.
- Scissors (voiced by Tom Kenny) – A friend who resembles a pair of scissors with bird-like legs with the scissors forming a beak.
- Uncle Pockets (voiced by Kevin Michael Richardson) – An old clown-like friend who resembles Willy Wonka, the Cat in the Hat or the Mad Hatter, considered widely to be the best imaginary friend ever.

== Other characters ==
- World/Tyrant King (voiced by Max Burkholder) – An imaginary friend, and the main and later former antagonist of "Destination: Imagination". World is a floating face that can possess any inanimate object and bring it to life.
- Red (voiced by Phil LaMarr) – Terrence's imaginary friend and rival, who he creates in "Seeing Red". Red is a red-colored cube-like creature similar to Bloo with arms and a face but no legs and refers to himself in third person.
- Ivan (voiced by Kevin McDonald) – A seeing-eye friend created by a blind kid named Stevie (a parody of Stevie Wonder and Steve Urkel) with over 100 eyes. He is first seen in "Sight for Sore Eyes".
- Berry (voiced by Grey DeLisle) – A polite magenta friend. Has a crush on Bloo, but dislikes how close Mac and Bloo are. Berry is jealous and disrespectful of Mac despite the latter being Bloo's creator.
- Bendy (voiced by Jeff Bennett) – A short, yellow Grinch-like friend with black stripes, the main antagonist of the equally non-canon episode "Everyone Knows It's Bendy." Bendy was put up for adoption by his family when they could no longer tolerate his destruction around their house. Immediately after his arrival, he begins committing crimes, such as breaking a vase and leaving mud in the house, and framing the other imaginary friends, getting them punished for his wrongdoings until Bloo comes up with a master plan. Due to Bendy never actually getting any consequence for his actions even by the end of the episode, the other characters being constantly punished for his crimes, and Mr. Herriman and Frankie acting way out of character by siding with him, Bendy's appearance was so infamous that writer Lauren Faust apologized for writing the episode that he appeared in, and he was permanently written out of the show and the episode was declared non-canon as a result.
- Goofball John McGee (voiced by Tom Kenny) - An obnoxious and lazy friend who appears to be a human teenager poorly disguised as an imaginary friend in a clown costume, but is revealed to be an imaginary friend himself when his clown nose is taken off revealing an elephant trunk. According to Faust, McGee was originally supposed to be a 30-something-year old human man posing as an imaginary friend, but Cartoon Network executives forced them to rewrite the concept into a teenager, leading to Faust and Craig McCracken not liking the character themselves.
- Fleas (voiced by Keith Ferguson, Phil LaMarr, Tom Kenny, Candi Milo, Grey DeLisle and Tom Kane) - Although they appear to be ordinary fleas, they are actually imaginary. They are very hostile and distrustful towards everyone (mostly because they tried to kill them or in Bloo's case, take them for themselves) except Eduardo, whom they are good friends with; in fact, Eduardo's the only one who can control them.

== Character design ==
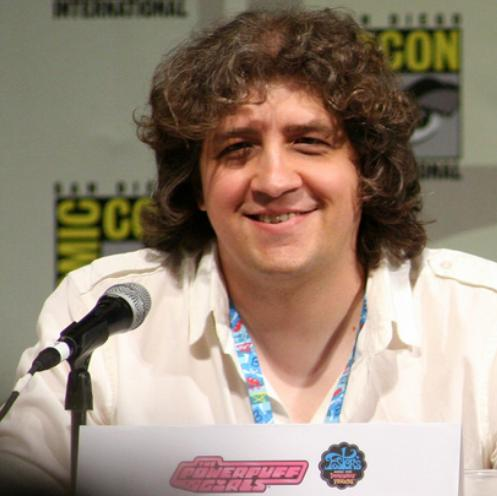
Creator of the show, Craig McCracken, at the Comic Con festival in 2008

Craig McCracken, the creator of the show, designed the main characters of Foster's Home for Imaginary Friends himself. His goal was to create numerous and quirky characters while also portraying the creators of each imaginary friend. According to McCracken, the imaginary friends are created in a child's mind to protect them, provide companionship, and fill the void of loneliness.

The first character McCracken created was Bloo. He claimed that Bloo reminded him of his own childhood, in which he always sought to be the center of attention. McCracken stated that the team never intended for Bloo to be malicious; while Bloo never deliberately harms others, he sometimes comes close to mischief. Mac, in contrast, is the opposite of his imaginary friend and embodies McCracken's contemporary self – sensitive, quiet, and cautious. McCracken explained that the differences in their personalities were due to his deep emotional experience of losing his father when he was seven. The two characters complement each other, as without Mac, Bloo might engage in much worse actions.

The character of Frankie was inspired by McCracken's wife, Lauren Faust. According to McCracken, Frankie represents a strong, independent woman with a vision for the Foster's home. She believes in the center's purpose so deeply that, despite the overwhelming tasks and ungrateful work, she continues to carry out her duties, and the residents treat her like an older sister.

Some characters were designed with influences from other eras: Wilt is modeled after a 1970s basketball player, while Mr. Herriman is deliberately portrayed as old-fashioned. Another character, Jackie Khones, is in-universe an imaginary friend originally created by Billy Dee Williams as a sidekick to Williams' character Lando Calrissian in Return of the Jedi before being rejected in favor of Nien Nunb. The gallery of supporting characters was created by the series' creative team, including Mike Moon, Ed Baker, Shannon Tindle, David Dunnet, and Benjamin Balistreri, who won multiple Emmy Awards for their individual achievements on the show.

== Character reception ==
The reception of the characters from Foster's Home for Imaginary Friends was generally positive. David Cornelius, a journalist from DVD Talk, described the range of imaginary friends as diverse: from clumsy whims of childlike imagination to highly intricate creatures varying in shape and size. Cornelius noted that each imaginary creation reflected the personality of its creator; hence, the simplest creatures are the products of infants’ fantasies, while the more intimidating creatures are the result of teenagers' imaginations.

Bloo was described by Cornelius as resembling a ghost from the video game Pac-Man; a deeper analysis of the character was presented by Mike Pinsky from DVD Verdict. According to him, Bloo represents a kind of "limitless id". The character of Cheese also sparked curiosity among reviewers: while Pinsky described him as the funniest character on the show and the "quintessence of the surreal charm" of the series, the IGN portal called him "the most annoying character in history" – in a positive sense. Cornelius saw Wilt as a character "polite to the point of being excessive", while Eduardo was described as a "big monster with a heart of gold". Coco, on the other hand, was called by Pinsky the most intelligent person in the cast. As for Mac, according to Anita Gates from The New York Times, he was simply "sweet".

A more skeptical view of the characters came from Joly Herman of Common Sense Media. She stated that the imaginary friends formed an “"nteresting and diverse" group of characters, but ultimately did not contribute much to the plot. In terms of behavior, Herman believed the characters did not serve as role models for children.
