= List of Foster's Home for Imaginary Friends episodes =

Foster's Home for Imaginary Friends is an American animated television series created by Craig McCracken for Cartoon Network. The series follows Mac, an eight-year-old boy who is pressured by his mother to abandon his imaginary friend, Bloo. Bloo subsequently moves into an orphanage for imaginary friends, where he is allowed to remain on the condition that Mac visits him daily. Episodes focus on the everyday adventures and predicaments involving Mac, Bloo, and the home's other residents.

The series premiered on August 13, 2004, with the 90-minute pilot episode "House of Bloo's", and concluded on May 3, 2009, with "Goodbye to Bloo". It ran for six seasons, each consisting of 13 episodes. A series of animated shorts also aired between 2006 and 2007.

== Series overview ==
Season	Episodes	Originally released	
Season	Episodes	First released	Last released
1	13 (Note: 14 segments; episode 10 contains two 11-minute segments; "Seeing Red / Phone Home")	August 13, 2004	October 22, 2004
2	13 (Note: 15 segments; episodes 3 and 4 contain two 11-minute segments; "Where There's a Wilt, There's a Way / Everyone Knows It's Bendy" and "Sight for Sore Eyes / Bloo's Brothers")	January 21, 2005	July 15, 2005
3	14	July 22, 2005	March 24, 2006
4	13	April 28, 2006	November 23, 2006
Shorts	18	June 9, 2006	August 7, 2007
5	13	May 4, 2007	March 6, 2008
6	13	March 13, 2008	May 3, 2009

== Episodes ==
Note: All episodes were directed by series creator Craig McCracken, with the only co-direction of Rob Renzetti in "Destination: Imagination".

=== Season 1 (2004) ===
No. overall	No. in season	Title	Animation direction by	Written by	Storyboard by	Original release date	Prod. code	K2–11 viewers (in millions)
1	1	"House of Bloo's"	Robert Alvarez	Craig McCracken	Craig McCracken; Lauren Faust, Brian Larsen, & Chris Dent (parts 2 & 3 only)	August 13, 2004	101	1.49
2	2	"House of Bloo's"	Randy Myers	Craig McCracken	Craig McCracken; Lauren Faust, Brian Larsen, & Chris Dent (parts 2 & 3 only)	August 13, 2004	102	1.49
3	3	"House of Bloo's"	Robert Alvarez	Craig McCracken	Craig McCracken; Lauren Faust, Brian Larsen, & Chris Dent (parts 2 & 3 only)	August 13, 2004	103	1.49
In the series premiere, Mac sends Bloo to live at Foster's Home for Imaginary Friends after his mother tells him he is too old to have an imaginary friend. There, they meet Mr. Herriman, Frankie, Wilt, Coco, and Eduardo, who explain that Bloo could eventually be adopted by another child. Not wanting to be separated, Mac promises to visit Bloo every day so he can remain at the house. Their arrangement is threatened when Mac's brother Terrence and a sinister imaginary friend, Duchess, attempt to get rid of Bloo.
4	4	"Store Wars"	Randy Myers	Lauren Faust	Ed Baker	August 20, 2004	107	N/A
On Madame Foster's birthday, Frankie realizes she has forgotten to buy streamers for the party, prompting Mr. Herriman to send her to the store. Mac, Bloo, Eduardo, Wilt, and Coco accompany her but wander off in the mall and become involved in various mishaps, slowing Frankie down.
5	5	"The Trouble with Scribbles"	Robert Alvarez	Craig Lewis	Chris Dent	August 27, 2004	109	N/A
Bloo learns about a mysterious door in the house that no one is allowed to open. When no one will tell him what lies behind it, he opens the door himself, releasing hundreds of imaginary friends known as scribbles—simple beings created by babies. Although they initially help with chores, their presence makes the others increasingly lazy.
6	6	"Busted"	Robert Alvarez	Amy Keating Rogers	Chris Dent	September 3, 2004	104	N/A
Mr. Herriman grows frustrated with Bloo's inability to follow the house rules and threatens to evict him. Under pressure, Bloo accidentally breaks a bust of Madame Foster and attempts to repair it before Mr. Herriman discovers the damage.
7	7	"Dinner Is Swerved"	Robert Alvarez	Amy Keating Rogers	Brian Larsen	September 10, 2004	105	1.68
When Mac visits Foster's, Bloo insists on showing him something on the roof, but the two become lost and cannot find their way back downstairs. Meanwhile, in the dining room, the others secretly sneak food while Mr. Herriman insists they wait for Bloo before starting dinner.
8	8	"World Wide Wabbit"	Randy Myers	Lauren Faust	Ed Baker	September 17, 2004	111	1.68
Mac and Bloo use Frankie's digital camera to record interviews for Foster's website, but accidentally capture footage of Mr. Herriman behaving playfully with Madame Foster. Although Mac plans to delete the video, Bloo instead shows it to Frankie and uploads it online. The trio then races to prevent Mr. Herriman from discovering his unexpected Internet fame.
9	9	"Berry Scary"	Robert Alvarez	Craig Lewis and Meghan McCarthy	Chris Dent	September 24, 2004	112	N/A
A new imaginary friend named Berry arrives at the house and initially appears sweet and friendly. However, she quickly becomes infatuated with Bloo and is determined to win his affection. When he ignores her, she becomes convinced that Mac is standing in her way.
10	10	"Seeing Red"	Robert Alvarez and Randy Myers	Chuck Klein	Chuck Klein	October 1, 2004	110	N/A
10	10	"Phone Home"	Randy Myers	Chris Savino	Clayton McKenzie Morrow	October 1, 2004	110	N/A
Seeing Red: Terrence creates an imaginary friend named Red to attack Bloo so he can freely bully Mac, but the friend turns out to be friendly rather than aggressive. Phone Home: Bloo becomes jealous of the praise Wilt receives for bringing abandoned imaginary friends to Foster's and attempts to do the same. After mistaking a man in a cell phone costume for an imaginary friend, he brings him to the house, hoping to outdo Wilt.
11	11	"Who Let the Dogs In?"	Randy Myers	Lauren Faust	Ed Baker	October 8, 2004	113	N/A
While taking out the trash, Eduardo finds a puppy and decides to keep it, despite dogs being forbidden in the house due to Mr. Herriman's fear of them. Although Eduardo tries to keep it hidden, the puppy escapes and causes trouble, which Eduardo takes the blame for to protect it.
12	12	"Adoptcalypse Now"	James Tim Walker	Craig Lewis	Chuck Klein and Vaughn Tada	October 15, 2004	106	N/A
During Adopt-a-Thought Saturday, an event designed to help imaginary friends get adopted, Mac and Bloo are upset when their friend Jokey is adopted. Determined not to lose more friends, they attempt to prevent others from being adopted by keeping them inside the house.
13	13	"Bloooo"	Randy Myers	Craig Lewis	Brian Larsen and Vaughn Tada	October 22, 2004	108	N/A
After playing in the mud, Mac and Bloo become sick. While Frankie takes Mac home, Bloo's condition worsens, causing him to miss a scary movie night. When Wilt, Eduardo, and Coco begin to believe the ghost in the film is real, they mistake a pale Bloo for it. Meanwhile, Frankie becomes locked out in the rain and, while trying to get back inside, begins to feel as though something is stalking her in the dark.

=== Season 2 (2005) ===
No. overall	No. in season	Title	Animation direction by	Written by	Storyboard by	Original release date	Prod. code	K2–11 viewers (in millions)
14	1	"Partying Is Such Sweet Soiree"	Robert Alvarez and Craig Kellman	Craig Lewis	Mike Kim	January 21, 2005	203	1.25
Frankie and Madame Foster leave for the day, placing Mr. Herriman in charge of the house. However, Madame Foster inadvertently gives Bloo the idea to throw a wild party, which he plans without permission. After devising a way to distract and remove Mr. Herriman from the house, only one obstacle remains: Mac. Bloo believes a little sugar will keep him occupied, but it instead turns him hyperactive, forcing Bloo to stop him before he ruins the party.
15	2	"The Big Lablooski"	Robert Alvarez and Paul O'Flanagan	Amy Keating Rogers	Vaughn Tada	January 28, 2005	201	N/A
Mac recruits the gang to join Madame Foster's bowling team to help her defeat her rival, Flo Jerkins. However, when Mac is removed from the team, he seeks help from an imaginary bowling guru to improve his skills.
16	3	"Where There's a Wilt, There's a Way"	Randy Myers	Craig Lewis	Clayton M. Morrow	February 4, 2005	202	1.85
16	3	"Everyone Knows It's Bendy"	Randy Myers	Lauren Faust	Mike Kim	February 4, 2005	202	1.85
Where There's a Wilt, There's a Way: Wilt tries to watch an important basketball game, but constant requests—and his inability to say no—continually interrupt him. Everyone Knows It's Bendy: A new imaginary friend named Bendy arrives at the house and begins causing trouble, framing Bloo, Wilt, Eduardo, and Coco for his actions. Bloo devises a plan to expose him.
17	4	"Sight for Sore Eyes"	Robert Alvarez	Lauren Faust	Clayton M. Morrow and Chuck Klein	March 4, 2005	204	N/A
17	4	"Bloo's Brothers"	Robert Alvarez	Adam Pava	Clayton M. Morrow	March 4, 2005	204	N/A
Sight for Sore Eyes: When Ivan, a seeing-eye imaginary friend, gets separated from the blind child he assists, the group works to reunite them before the boy comes to harm. Bloo's Brothers: Mac takes Bloo to school for show-and-tell, and his classmates love Bloo so much that they imagine their own Bloo knock-offs. The duplicates arrive at Foster's, leaving Mac to determine which one is the original Bloo.
18	5	"Cookie Dough"	Randy Myers and Robert Cullen	Adam Pava	Ed Baker	March 11, 2005	205	N/A
When Foster's needs a new roof, Bloo decides to raise money by selling Madame Foster's cookies. As the plan succeeds, Bloo becomes increasingly obsessed with expanding it into a large-scale business.
19	6	"Frankie My Dear"	Robert Alvarez and Craig Kellman	Lauren Faust	Lauren Faust	March 18, 2005	206	1.18
Frankie is frustrated about staying in to complete paperwork instead of going out with friends, so Mac offers to do it for her. Grateful, Frankie kisses him on the cheek, leading Mac—and later Bloo—to develop crushes on her. The two compete for her affection, only to discover she is interested in someone else. Jealous, they attempt to sabotage her interactions with other suitors, including a pizza delivery boy and Prince Charming (an imaginary friend). Eventually, they learn her real date is Dylan Lee, and they team up to disrupt the evening.
20	7	"Mac Daddy"	Robert Alvarez and Craig Kellman	Lauren Faust	Chris Dent and Lauren Faust	May 6, 2005	207	N/A
One morning, Mac wakes up to discover he has unintentionally created another imaginary friend named Cheese. Madame Foster allows him to stay under the same rules as Bloo, but Bloo strongly disapproves of his new "brother." After several failed attempts to get rid of him, Cheese eventually disappears on his own. Bloo then realizes that Foster's may be a dangerous place for someone as naive as Cheese.
21	8	"Squeakerboxxx"	Robert Alvarez and Paul O'Flanagan	Craig Lewis	Ed Baker	May 13, 2005	208	N/A
The gang visits an arcade, where everyone except Bloo wins large amounts of tickets. Determined to win glow-in-the-dark Dracula teeth, Bloo asks the others to give him their tickets, but they instead pool them together for a rubber elephant. After discovering the toy squeaks, Bloo becomes obsessed with it, accidentally breaks it, and must find a replacement before the others notice.
22	9	"Beat with a Schtick"	Robert Alvarez and Craig Kellman	Craig Lewis	Ed Baker and Mike Kim	May 20, 2005	209	N/A
Bloo prides himself on being funny, though his jokes sometimes offend others. After cracking a joke about an imaginary friend's height, the "New Guy" challenges him to meet outside at 4:00 to get "squashed."
23	10	"The Sweet Stench of Success"	Chris Savino and Robert Cullen	Adam Pava	Vaughn Tada	May 27, 2005	210	N/A
After trying to outshine Eduardo on a local news segment, Bloo unexpectedly becomes a celebrity. However, he soon learns that fame is not as glamorous as he imagined.
24	11	"Bye Bye Nerdy"	Chris Savino and Paul O'Flanagan	Tim McKeon	Vaughn Tada	July 1, 2005	211	1.07
After beating Mac's high score in a video game, Bloo goes to his school to gloat, but is horrified when he concludes that Mac is a "nerd." Determined to fix this, Bloo tries to make Mac cool, but none of his ideas succeed. Ironically, when Mac insists he does not care about being cool, the school's most popular kid, Jamez Withazee, declares him cool and invites him to hang out at "The Rock." When Mac accepts and fails to return to Foster's by 3:00, Mr. Herriman moves to have Bloo adopted.
25	12	"Bloo Done It"	Robert Alvarez and Robert Cullen	Craig Lewis and Adam Pava	Neal Sternecky and Vaughn Tada	July 8, 2005	212	N/A
While the house newspaper is being produced, Uncle Pockets—one of the most frequently adopted imaginary friends—returns once again. His charm draws everyone's attention, making Bloo jealous. Determined to prove he is a fraud, Bloo sets out to expose him through the newspaper.
26	13	"My So Called Wife"	Chris Savino and Craig Kellman	Adam Pava	Ed Baker	July 15, 2005	213	N/A
A wealthy benefactor visits Foster's to decide whether to donate to the home. Mr. Herriman asks Mac and Bloo to keep Coco out of sight, but the benefactor mistakenly assumes Coco is Mr. Herriman's wife, improving his impression of the house. He later invites them to his mansion to make a final decision. Mr. Herriman attempts to teach Coco sophistication, while Mac and Frankie try to teach Bloo about sarcasm.

=== Season 3 (2005–06) ===
No. overall	No. in season	Title	Animation direction by	Written by	Storyboard by	Original release date	Prod. code	K2–11 viewers (in millions)
27	1	"Eddie Monster"	Robert Alvarez, Lauren Faust, and Eric Pringle	Craig Lewis	Chris Dent	July 22, 2005	301	1.17
Eduardo runs away from the home to prove he is not a coward. Meanwhile, Terrence is searching for an imaginary friend to compete in the Extreme-O-Saur Battle when he comes across Eduardo. As Mac, Bloo, Wilt, and Coco search for him, Terrence uses Eduardo to fight other large imaginary friends at a junkyard.
28	2	"Hiccy Burp"	Paul O'Flanagan and Chris Savino	Craig Lewis	Neal Sternecky and Alex Almaguer	September 5, 2005	302	N/A
Richie Wildebrat, a classmate of Mac, constantly boasts about his imaginary friend Blake Superior and their chances of winning a talent show. Wanting to stop the bragging, Mac asks Bloo to enter, but Bloo refuses until he develops hiccups and is mocked by Blake, prompting him to compete.
29	3	"Camp Keep a Good Mac Down"	Robert Alvarez and Eric Pringle	Tim McKeon	Ed Baker	September 9, 2005	303	1.59
Mac and Bloo ask Mr. Herriman to go camping, but he initially refuses until Madame Foster approves. After arriving, Bloo eats all the food, prompting Mr. Herriman to venture into the woods in search of more, where he encounters wild rabbits. Meanwhile, the others face their own mishaps: Madame Foster fights a bear, Wilt gets stuck in quicksand, Coco goes fishing, and Mac, Bloo, and Eduardo get lost in the woods.
30	4	"Imposter's Home for Um... Make 'Em Up Pals"	Robert Alvarez, Eric Pringle, and Lauren Faust	Craig Lewis	Chris Dent	September 16, 2005	305	N/A
Goofball John McGee arrives at Foster's and quickly becomes a nuisance. Frankie suspects he is actually a teenager pretending to be an imaginary friend, citing his constant need for help and freeloading behavior. While the others accept him, Frankie becomes determined to prove he is a fraud.
31	5	"Duchess of Wails"	Robert Cullen and Brian Hogan	Adam Pava and Amy Keating Rogers	Vaughn Tada	September 23, 2005	304	1.47
Foster's finally gets rid of Duchess when she is adopted, but her new family turns out to be Mac's next-door neighbors. Her constant complaining soon becomes too much for Mac's mother, who considers moving. Mac and Bloo attempt to frame Duchess to have her returned, but only make her more loved. When they try to bring her back themselves, Terrence warns the house residents, who try to stop her from re-entering. Ultimately, Terrence's plan fails when the residents learn Mac might move and agree to take Duchess back.
32	6	"Foster's Goes to Europe"	Robert Cullen and Chris Savino	Tim McKeon	Ed Baker	November 4, 2005	306	N/A
Mac wins a sweepstakes and receives tickets to Europe, but when the gang tries to pack at the last minute, a series of delays slows them down. Meanwhile, Frankie prepares Madame Foster to run the house in their absence.
33	7	"Go Goo Go"	Robert Alvarez, Lauren Faust, and Eric Pringle	Lauren Faust	Vaughn Tada	November 11, 2005	307	N/A
Mac meets a girl named Goo after falling on her while retrieving a bobsled from a tree. She begins visiting Foster's daily, using her hyperactive imagination to create numerous imaginary friends, quickly overcrowding the house. As a result, the others are forced to sleep on the Foster's bus and begin to blame Mac for Goo's constant visits.
34	8	"Crime After Crime"	Robert Alvarez, Randy Myers, and Paul O'Flanagan	Lauren Faust	Ed Baker	November 18, 2005	308	N/A
Mr. Herriman's carrot addiction leads him to blame Coco for stealing carrots meant for dinner, though he is actually responsible for hiding them. With no carrots left, Frankie is forced to prepare "It," an unappetizing dish Bloo is determined to avoid. Meanwhile, Mr. Herriman punishes anyone near his hidden carrots, and Bloo repeatedly tries to get in trouble to skip dinner, only to be overlooked as chaos spreads throughout the house.
35	9	"Land of the Flea"	Robert Alvarez, Lauren Faust, and Eric Pringle	Adam Pava and Lauren Faust	Kirk Hanson	November 25, 2005	309	N/A
Eduardo gets fleas from his puppy and is driven mad by the itching. However, he grows attached to them and refuses to get rid of them, while Frankie and Mr. Herriman take drastic measures to remove the infestation. Meanwhile, Bloo tries to get fleas of his own and repeatedly attempts to convince Eduardo to share them.
36	10	"A Lost Claus"	Robert Alvarez and Robert Cullen	Lauren Faust	Vaughn Tada	December 1, 2005	N/A	1.42
When various imaginary Santa Clauses arrive at Foster's, Mac begins to lose his belief in Santa Claus. Bloo and the others attempt to restore his faith through a series of misguided plans, including sending Wilt on a global sleigh ride and having Eduardo try to use the chimney. Their efforts backfire, causing widespread chaos—Wilt is lost, Eduardo gets stuck, Coco loses her job as a mall Santa, and Mr. Herriman throws away the holiday decorations. The group must find a way to save the holiday before it is ruined.
37	11	"One False Movie"	Robert Cullen and Robert Alvarez	Adam Pava	Andy Schuhler	February 10, 2006	310	N/A
Mac makes a home movie about Foster's for a school project, but Bloo edits it into a crude comedy filled with flatulent sound effects, earning it a spot in a student film festival. With Bloo's help, they create a new film, but Eduardo accidentally tapes over it with his favorite educational program, costing them the contest.
38	12	"Setting a President"	Robert Alvarez and Eric Pringle	Adam Pava	Douglas McCarthy and Vaughn Tada	February 17, 2006	311	1.29
Tired of Mr. Herriman's strict rules, Frankie runs for president of the house. Bloo also enters the race but later drops out, helping Herriman by spreading embarrassing, even false, claims about Frankie. Frankie ultimately wins, leaving Herriman jobless.
39	13	"Room with a Feud"	Robert Cullen, Robert Alvarez, and Randy Myers	Tim McKeon	Vaughn Tada	March 17, 2006	312	N/A
When an adoption leaves a room vacant at Foster's, Bloo, Coco, Wilt, and Eduardo compete for it, along with another friend named Peanut Butter. Their rivalry escalates into a series of contests, many of which Bloo attempts to rig in his favor.
40	14	"Cuckoo for Coco Cards"	Robert Alvarez and Eric Pringle	Cindy Morrow and Lauren Faust	Ed Baker	March 24, 2006	313	N/A
During a school field trip to Foster's, Coco becomes popular when she lays eggs containing imaginary friend trading cards. As everyone begins collecting them, Bloo grows obsessed with obtaining a complete set.

=== Season 4 (2006) ===
No. overall	No. in season	Title	Animation direction by	Written by	Storyboard by	Original release date	Prod. code	K2–11 viewers (in millions)
41	1	"Challenge of the Super Friends"	Robert Cullen and Robert Alvarez	Lauren Faust	Vaughn Tada	April 28, 2006	401	N/A
When a large and dangerous imaginary friend starts destroying the city, a superhero friend named Imaginary Man comes to save the day, and Mac becomes his biggest fan. When Mac gets recruited as Imaginary Man's sidekick, however, he ditches Bloo and starts to forget about their friendship. As a result, Bloo joins forces with Nemesis, Imaginary Man's mortal enemy, to get revenge on Mac.
42	2	"The Big Picture"	Robert Alvarez, Eric Pringle, and Randy Myers	Tim McKeon	Chris Dent and Andy Schuhler	May 5, 2006	402	N/A
The residents of Foster's prepare for the annual house photo. Meanwhile, Eduardo gets an "extreme makeover" from Duchess, Coco thinks that she needs to lose weight, Wilt has trouble being in the house photo without getting his head cut out of the frame, and Mac and Bloo search for an answer behind a strange photo taken of the friends many years ago.
43	3	"Squeeze the Day"	Robert Alvarez and Eric Pringle	Tim McKeon	Ed Baker	May 12, 2006	403	N/A
Bloo wakes up to find the house completely deserted. With no Herriman or Frankie there to enforce the house rules, Mac and Bloo set out to cram as much fun and mischief into one day as they possibly can.
44	4	"Neighbor Pains"	Robert Cullen and Robert Alvarez	Tim McKeon	Andrew Schuhler	May 19, 2006	404	N/A
On Adopt-a-Thought Saturday, Madame Foster renews a feud with her cranky old neighbor Old Man Rivers with disastrous consequences. Meanwhile, Bloo tries to settle a score of his own with Rivers' irritating grandson, Young Man Rivers.
45	5	"Infernal Slumber"	Robert Alvarez and Eric Pringle	Tim McKeon	Vaughn Tada	July 17, 2006	405	N/A
Bloo and the gang arrive at Mac's apartment for a slumber party that Mac did not plan. Mac tries desperately to keep his friends quiet before they wake up his mom and brother with their shenanigans.
46	6	"I Only Have Surprise for You"	Robert Alvarez and Eric Pringle	Tim McKeon	Ed Baker	July 27, 2006	406	N/A
Mac suspects that Bloo, along with the rest of the house, are planning him a surprise party. Mac, however, wants no part of it, since Bloo's surprise parties always humiliate him in some way, and he is determined to foil Bloo's plans by any means necessary.
47	7	"Bus the Two of Us"	Robert Alvarez and Eric Pringle	Meghan McCarthy and Lauren Faust	Neal Sternecky and Craig McCracken	August 1, 2006	407	N/A
Bloo notices after a trip to the grocery store that Frankie has left the keys in the bus and decides to take Mac for a joyride in the Foster's bus. Wilt, Coco, and Goo promise to keep it a secret, much to Wilt's disconcern.
48	8	"The Big Cheese"	Randy Myers and Eric Pringle	Lauren Faust	Vaughn Tada	August 7, 2006	408	N/A
Foster's is being put on the local news and Frankie wants everything perfect, but the only thing standing in her way is Cheese who keeps showing up at Foster's uninvited. In an attempt to keep him out, Mr. Herriman installs a security system. Unfortunately, due to misreading the instructions, everyone gets locked out of the house and nobody knows the password except for Cheese, who memorized the code as a song.
49	9	"Bloo's the Boss"	Robert Alvarez and Eric Pringle	Darrick Bachman	Ed Baker	November 3, 2006	409	N/A
Bloo is tired of Madame Foster getting all the glory for rescuing abandoned friends, so he sets up his own foster home - Bloo's Foster's Home for Imaginary Friends - in a cardboard box on the sidewalk.
50	10	"Emancipation Complication"	Robert Cullen and Robert Alvarez	Darrick Bachman	Neal Sternecky and Ed Baker	November 10, 2006	410	N/A
An imaginary pen resembling Abraham Lincoln is confiscated by Mac's teacher after she catches him helping his creator cheat on a history test. Mac hatches a plan to rescue the friend - along with his au pair Moose - from the classroom closet, but the imaginary Honest Abe does not quite live up to his namesake when he cons Madame Foster and starts selling the friends for profit.
51	11	"Make Believe It or Not"	Robert Alvarez and Eric Pringle	Kirk Thatcher	Kelsey Mann	November 17, 2006	413	N/A
When a thunderstorm knocks out the power at Foster's, the gang organizes a game of pretend. Goo - who pretends to be an international pop star - gets upset when the boys do not want to play with her, so she make-believes a gang of villains that will force them to listen to her imaginary concert. In her sleep, Goo accidentally makes all her villains come alive. Now, she must finish the game to save her friends from her own creations.
52	12	"Good Wilt Hunting"	Robert Alvarez, Eric Pringle, and Robert Cullen	Lauren Faust	Vaughn Tada and Ed Baker	November 23, 2006	411	1.38
53	13	"Good Wilt Hunting"	Robert Alvarez, Eric Pringle, and Robert Cullen	Lauren Faust	Vaughn Tada and Ed Baker	November 23, 2006	412	1.38
In this double-length special, the Five-Year Creator Reunion Picnic takes place, where imaginary friends' creators come to Foster's to see their former friends. One friend's creator, however, is missing: Wilt's. Wilt, believing that his creator is still mad at him for a past letdown, sets off on a cross-country journey to rectify the situation. Meanwhile, Mac, Bloo, and Frankie, along with Eduardo and his creator, Officer Nina Valerosa, and Coco, along with the two scientists who discovered her, set out to find Wilt and bring him back home.

=== Shorts (2006–07) ===
No.	Title	Original air date
1	"Driving Miss Crazy"	June 9, 2006
Frankie goes to find out about the non-functioning bus and everyone wants to come along which delays her. Frankie and the gang finally get to the mechanic, only to find that the bus is not ready yet because the carburetor is filled with cheese fries.
2	"Neighborhood Wash"	July 7, 2006
Mac and the other friends start a car wash to pay for a porcelain poodle that Bloo broke. To help, Bloo throws mud at every car that goes by to get more customers.
3	"All Zapped Up"	November 20, 2006
Frankie tells Bloo that static electricity can be produced by rubbing socks together. After learning this, he zaps Frankie, then Wilt, then both Wilt and Frankie at the same time. Running through the halls, he zaps Madame Foster, Coco, and Jackie Khones. He tries to zap Mr. Herriman, but nothing happens. Bloo "re-charges" by rubbing onto the rug, a towel, an imaginary friend (who happens to be Sunset Junction), and two socks. After that, he gives Eduardo a big zap, but in the end, Bloo zaps himself while trying to get the door open for his package.
4	"Bad to the Phone"	December 8, 2006
Bloo tries to make a good recording message for the Fosters Home phone, getting various others to help. Eventually, Bloo gets satisfied with one but Madame Foster plugs too many devices into the same outlet as the phone, fricasseeing the phone from the overload.
5	"Truth or Stare"	December 8, 2006
Mac and Bloo have a staring contest and Eduardo tries to talk to them only to think they are frozen solid, consequently getting Frankie to tell him about it. More of the house's residents watch in a bet, as Mac seems to start losing his grip, only to recover it. It is revealed that Bloo was hiding behind a cardboard cut-out of himself.
6	"A Chore Thing"	January 1, 2007
Mr. Herriman tells Bloo to sort the trash as punishment because Bloo hosted a mud-wrestling tournament in the living room. Mac comes along and talks Bloo into pretending it is fun so that other people will want to do it. Soon, he has everybody doing it. Mac tries to tell him that it is not fun after Bloo refuses to go do something else. He thinks everybody is going to take the trash for themselves and tells them to get out. Then he realizes it is not fun without the guys and walks away, until Mr. Herriman comes in and tells him to finish sorting the trash.
7	"Hide and Bloo Seek"	January 1, 2007
Bloo is determined to win a game of Hide and Seek, so he hides in the trash. Things go awry when a few friends start playing "Kick the Trashbag".
8	"Badvertisement"	January 1, 2007
Bloo makes a commercial for Fosters and ends up in trouble when a bunch of people show up because he told them that the first people there in 10 minutes get money and the Fosters bus.
9	"Give Pizza a Chance"	February 14, 2007
Bloo leaves the fridge open after getting himself a snack, which leads to Frankie telling Wilt to order pizza. Bloo tells him to order five hundred pizzas, at the price of $6532.12. Frankie cannot pay that much, so Bloo, Wilt, and Ed stall Quinn the delivery boy by sitting on him because the pizza is free if it is not there in 30 minutes.
10	"Backpack Attack"	June 23, 2007
Jackie Khones questions Bloo about Mac's backpack and Bloo becomes obsessed with finding out what is in it.
11	"Petrified Pet"	July 1, 2007
Bloo finds a strange rock digging in the yard and it is declared to be a fossil by Phineus B. Vurm, the bookworm imaginary friend. Bloo treats it as a pet until Frankie reveals it is actually petrified feces.
12	"Fistful of Cereal"	July 2, 2007
Bloo tries getting a secret decoder ring from a cereal box. Mr. Herriman forbids him to get the toy without eating the cereal down to the ring. He then realizes that a secret decoder ring can decode his files on house residents and competes with Bloo in order to get the ring first.
13	"Cranks a Lot"	July 4, 2007
Bloo tricks Mac into making crank calls to Mr. Herriman. Their joke is simply blowing raspberries into the phone, redialing again and again. Each time Herriman tries to get back at them by doing the same thing, it is not them redialing, it is Frankie asking about groceries in the mall. The last call Herriman gets was not from Mac and Bloo or Frankie; instead, it was from Madame Foster.
14	"Drawing Bored"	July 4, 2007
Eduardo tries to draw a story but Bloo, Wilt, and Coco keep interrupting him, drawing their own additions to the story. Frankie interrupts them, revealing that they had been drawing on a wall in the house.
15	"Hair Today, Gone Tomorrow"	July 4, 2007
Bloo ruins Mac's hair with gum the day before School Picture Day. Bloo tries to make it up to him, but only makes matters worse.
16	"Coconuts"	July 4, 2007
Bloo tries to decipher a message from friends whose vocabulary has only one word each, like Coco. When he figures it out, he does not believe it until he realizes it is true.
17	"Pen Pal"	August 5, 2007
Eduardo has a British penpal and Bloo is convinced that it is the Queen of the United Kingdom. He tries to make her his penpal instead by writing her a letter. Mac suggests to use Nancy, an English pen imaginary friend, but Bloo claims it will make the letter "boring". Mac then suggests a care-package to make her really believe that Bloo cares. Bloo brings in a huge package, but it turns out the penpal was really Nancy. She claims the package is "boring" and she can only use it as a doorstop.
18	"Birthday Cake Bloos"	August 7, 2007
It is Bloo's birthday, and his cake is being guarded by Mr. Herriman. After being refused to have his cake, Bloo leaves and Frankie comes in and sees Mr. Herriman sleeping on the job. She makes it look like he ate the cake in his sleep and leaves. Mr. Herriman soon wakes up and notices this and thinks he indeed ate the cake, at which point Frankie is yelling for Bloo to come into the kitchen, as they both enter, Frankie sees the cake is gone and scolds Bloo for it and threatens to kick him out. Feeling guilty, Mr. Herriman confesses that he ate the cake, on which both Frankie and Bloo begin to laugh, saying they pulled a prank on him and that the cake is just fine. When Frankie opens the refrigerator to show that the cake is fine, it actually is gone, having been taken by Madame Foster.

=== Season 5 (2007–08) ===
No. overall	No. in season	Title	Animation direction by	Written by	Storyboard by	Original release date	Prod. code
54	1	"Cheese a Go-Go" (Note: This episode was the first of five chapters for a special network event titled "Cartoon Network Invaded", a month-long event that featured five different shows having alien invasions.)	Robert Alvarez and Eric Pringle	Darrick Bachman and Lauren Faust	Ed Baker	May 4, 2007	501
Bloo is suddenly convinced that Cheese is an alien spy working for an evil extraterrestrial organization to remove brains of people on earth and cause an alien invasion after watching a science fiction movie and reading a tabloid newspaper where pictures are similar to Cheese. Later on, Frankie and everyone else (including Bloo) are stuck in an out of control day of errands and priorities, which causes utter bedlam when Cheese screams "gotta go" hundreds of times and Bloo uses the observatory intercom to communicate with aliens from outer space.
55	2	"The Buck Swaps Here"	Robert Alvarez and Eric Pringle	Charlie Bean and Craig McCracken	Vaughn Tada	May 18, 2007	502
The gang goes to a swap meet where a pick-pocket is stealing money. When the thief accidentally loses a $100 bill, Eduardo finds it and takes his money around the swap meet looking for something to buy. Even the most sensible of the gang are tempted by the bill, and with the thief also trying to catch his money, chaos ensues.
56	3	"Say It Isn't Sew"	Robert Alvarez and Eric Pringle	Darrick Bachman	Kelsey Mann	June 8, 2007	503
When the whole house goes to a fair, Mac and Bloo compete to see who will throw up last on a ride called the Vomit Comet. Bloo ditches Mac to ride in Madame Foster's Firebird, but a "quick" stop at the fabric store across the street from the fair suddenly turns into a nightmare for Bloo that does not seem to end, causing him to take big measures to try to get out of it.
57	4	"Something Old, Something Bloo"	Robert Alvarez and Eric Pringle	Kirk Thatcher and Lauren Faust	Ed Baker	June 15, 2007	504
Bloo visits a retirement home and disguises himself as a senior, getting to live there and being pampered all day long. When Mac finds out about it, Madame Foster teams up with him in order to get Bloo out of there.
58	5	"The Bloo Superdude and the Magic Potato of Power!"	Robert Alvarez and Eric Pringle	Craig McCracken	Vaughn Tada	September 10, 2007	505
Bloo entertains Mac with an action-packed story about a crystal "potato" of power. A little boy (Eduardo), an alien (Coco), a hermit (Wilt), a magical fairy (Frankie), and the Superdude (Bloo) attempt to protect the crystal potato from the evil Lord Snooty (Herriman), who is taking away all the fun in the land ruled by the Queen (Madame Foster). The story, Mac finds out, is a complete exaggeration of the day's events at Foster's.
59	6	"Schlock Star"	Robert Alvarez and Eric Pringle	Darrick Bachman	Kelsey Mann	September 11, 2007	506
A rock and roll band called Pizza Party, formed by a group of imaginary friends, annoy Bloo by not allowing him to be their lead singer, so he decides to form his own band with Wilt, Eduardo, and Coco called Taco Fiesta. Soon, they are challenged to a "Battle of the Bands".
60	7	"The Bride to Beat"	Robert Alvarez and Eric Pringle	Chris Savino and Lauren Faust	Ed Baker	September 12, 2007	507
Bloo overhears Mac talking about his supposed wedding. Dismayed, Bloo finds help from a depressed imaginary friend, not wanting to lose Mac forever. Bloo observes some adults and mimics them to try to grow up for Mac.
61	8	"Affair Weather Friends"	Robert Alvarez and Eric Pringle	Cindy Morrow and Lauren Faust	Vaughn Tada	September 13, 2007	508
A rich kid named Barry Bling comes to Foster's, and Mac and Bloo introduce him to all of the imaginary friends. After seeing all of the friends, Barry wishes to adopt Bloo, but Mac tells him that Bloo is not up for adoption. Bloo, however, begins sneaking over to Barry's house in order to play with his automatic paddle ball machine. When Mac goes to pick up Bloo, he soon finds out the shocking truth about Barry.
62	9	"Ticket to Rod"	Robert Alvarez and Eric Pringle	Darrick Bachman	Ed Baker	October 5, 2007	510
Bloo, Frankie, and Madame Foster are tangled up in a chaotic series of events when Frankie wins tickets to the premiere of a new action movie starring Rod Tango.
63	10	"Nightmare on Wilson Way"	Robert Alvarez and Eric Pringle	Darrick Bachman	Kelsey Mann	October 12, 2007	509
Bloo tries the old peanut brittle can filled with snakes trick, thinking it as the ultimate Halloween prank after strapping Mac to his bed, thus not allowing him to go trick-or-treating because of his regular sugar rushes. However, when Mr. Herriman tries it, Bloo thinks it has gone awry, and Herriman becomes a zombie, with the others also becoming undead later on through the episode. However, everyone was just pretending to be zombies and it was a prank set up for Bloo.
64	11	"Better Off Ed"	Robert Alvarez and Eric Pringle	Darrick Bachman	Vaughn Tada	October 19, 2007	511
Eduardo tells some little white lies to the nursery residents of Foster's, and now has to cover his tracks so they cannot catch up to him.
65	12	"The Little Peas"	Robert Alvarez and Eric Pringle	Darrick Bachman and Lauren Faust	Kelsey Mann and Vaughn Tada	November 22, 2007	512
This episode tells the story of "The Big Cheese" through the eyes of a one-inch tall imaginary friend named Peas, detailing how he helped Frankie turn a negative into a positive.
66	13	"Let Your Hare Down"	Robert Alvarez and Eric Pringle	Rob Renzetti	Ed Baker	March 6, 2008	513
A plan to have Mr. Herriman mellow out backfires as conditions at the home start to deteriorate.

=== Season 6 (2008–09) ===
No. overall	No. in season	Title	Animation direction by	Written by	Storyboard by	Original release date	Prod. code
67	1	"Jackie Khones and the Case of the Overdue Library Crook"	Robert Alvarez and Eric Pringle	Darrick Bachman	Ed Baker	March 13, 2008	601
Mac seeks the aid of Jackie Khones to find out who stole his library card and used it to check out a now-overdue book.
68	2	"Mondo Coco"	Robert Alvarez and Eric Pringle	Rob Renzetti	Kelsey Mann	April 10, 2008	602
Coco escapes from Foster's, and a chain of events has her on adventures all over the world.
69	3	"Pranks for Nothing"	Robert Alvarez and Eric Pringle	Darrick Bachman and Lauren Faust	Ed Baker	April 24, 2008	603
A termite infestation at Foster's forces Mr. Herriman to move the Friends into a hotel for the night. While at the hotel, Bloo, being rambunctious, gets out of hand, disobeying all of Mr. Herriman's rules. To get rid of him, Wilt, Eduardo, and Coco play a prank on Bloo, though Mr. Herriman believes Bloo did it. Bloo, angry at Coco, challenges her to a prank war, turning the night into an outrageous chain of pranks.
70	4	"Bloo Tube"	Robert Alvarez and Eric Pringle	Rob Renzetti	Vaughn Tada	May 8, 2008	604
When rain forces them to cancel their trip to a water park called Monsoon Lagoon, the gang decide to have their own fun, by making videos and uploading them to ViewTube (a parody of YouTube), while Bloo is constantly sulking because of their canceled trip.
71	5	"Race for Your Life Mac and Bloo"	Robert Alvarez and Eric Pringle	Mitch Larson and Craig McCracken	Ed Baker	May 29, 2008	605
Bloo becomes tired of always losing to Mac at everything, so one day at the Prize Hive, he challenges Mac to a thirty-mile race back to Foster's.
72	6	"Destination: Imagination" (Note: "Destination: Imagination" has a TV-PG rating rather than the show's usual TV-Y7 rating. This is due to the movie having some darker scenes for the younger audience of the show.)	Robert Alvarez and Eric Pringle	Lauren Faust and Tim McKeon	Vaughn Tada, Ed Baker, Rob Renzetti, Ben Balistreri, and Kelsey Mann	November 27, 2008	611
73	7	"Destination: Imagination"	Robert Alvarez and Eric Pringle	Lauren Faust and Tim McKeon	Vaughn Tada, Ed Baker, Rob Renzetti, Ben Balistreri, and Kelsey Mann	November 27, 2008	612
74	8	"Destination: Imagination"	Robert Alvarez and Eric Pringle	Lauren Faust and Tim McKeon	Vaughn Tada, Ed Baker, Rob Renzetti, Ben Balistreri, and Kelsey Mann	November 27, 2008	613
Frankie is tired of working without being thanked. One day, a toy box is discovered at Foster's front door. Frankie is ordered to take it to the attic and leave it alone, but she knows there is an imaginary friend trapped inside, and opens the box to find it. When she looks inside, she falls into a strange imaginary world. There, she gets treated like a princess by a mysterious imaginary friend, World (as named by the crew). After tackling certain bizarre toy box trials and tribulations, Bloo, Mac, Wilt, Eduardo, and Coco discover Frankie's whereabouts and set out to rescue her from this strange world.
75	9	"The Bloo Superdude and the Great Creator of Everything's Awesome Ceremony of Fun That He's Not Invited To"	Robert Alvarez and Eric Pringle	Darrick Bachman and Craig McCracken	Kelsey Mann and Vaughn Tada	May 3, 2009 (Note: This episode first premiered on February 22, 2009 in Europe.)	606
In the sequel to "The Bloo Superdude and the Magic Potato of Power!", Bloo must set out on a quest if he wishes to attend a ceremony honoring The Great Creator of Everything (Mac). In reality, Bloo is sick, delirious and hallucinating, making him think he is the Superdude when he is only running around the house trying to get and Mac's birthday party outside.
76	10	"Bad Dare Day"	Robert Alvarez and Eric Pringle	Darrick Bachman	Ed Baker and Vaughn Tada	May 3, 2009 (Note: This episode first premiered on February 28, 2009 in Europe.)	607
A little dare between Mac and Bloo turns into a huge daring competition between the house members once Madame Foster gets involved.
77	11	"Read 'Em and Weep"	Robert Alvarez and Eric Pringle	Rob Renzetti	Rob Renzetti and Vaughn Tada	May 3, 2009 (Note: This episode first premiered on March 1, 2009 in Europe.)	608
Bloo is sad about Eduardo getting adopted and holds auditions to get an alternate one; meanwhile, the residents get letters from those that were adopted in another Adopt-a-Thought Saturday.
78	12	"Fools and Regulations"	Robert Alvarez and Eric Pringle	Tim McKeon	Ed Baker	May 3, 2009	609
Frankie and Mr. Herriman are hosting an important party in the foyer to raise funds for the house, so Frankie tells Bloo, Wilt, Eduardo, and Coco to either stay upstairs or outside. After a series of ridiculous deciding, they choose to stay upstairs, but after being there for a while, they get bored and decide to go outside. Nothing bad happens until Mac comes with video games and they realize they are stuck outside. The situation becomes chaotic as they try to get inside and end up ruining things for Mr. Herriman and Frankie.
79	13	"Goodbye to Bloo"	Robert Alvarez and Eric Pringle	Darrick Bachman and Tim McKeon	Ed Baker and Vaughn Tada	May 3, 2009	610
Mr. Herriman explains that Mac is moving; Bloo decides to give him the best day ever, though things do not go as he planned. Through the entire day, Mac does things with everyone but Bloo, making him angrier and more emotionally hurt after every disappointment. He also gets more pressured every time the clock announces the hour. However, to everyone's surprise and relief (and Mr. Herriman realizes he forgot to mention this), it turns out Mac is moving to an apartment just next door that was held by Louise's family. On a less happy tone for everyone at Foster's, Cheese ends up moving in because Louise's new home does not allow imaginary friends. The show ends with the house slowly being erased as the beginning of the show's theme song plays in reverse. Cheese then says a final goodbye to the audience, ending the series.
