= Mike Moon (animator) =

American art designer and producer

Mike Moon is an American animator and producer known for his work on Timon & Pumbaa, Mickey Mouse Works, Foster's Home for Imaginary Friends, and Entergalactic. Moon has won one Annie Award, one Daytime Emmy Award, and one Primetime Emmy Award and has been nominated for one other Annie Award and one Black Reel TV Award.

== Filmography ==
=== Film ===
Year	Title	Role
1999	The Iron Giant	Background designer (uncredited)
2001	Mickey's Magical Christmas: Snowed in at the House of Mouse	Art director
2002	The Powerpuff Girls Movie	Art director
2003	Stitch! The Movie	Art director
2018	Spider-Man: Into the Spider-Verse	Studio executive
2021	The Mitchells vs. the Machines	Special thanks

=== Television ===
Year	Title	Role
1990–1991	The Simpsons	Background cleanup artist
1991–1994	Taz-Mania	Background layout artist
1993	Batman: The Animated Series	Background designer
1993	Animaniacs	Model designer
1993–1995	2 Stupid Dogs	Production designer, key layout designer
1994	Scooby-Doo! in Arabian Nights	Layout designer
1994	A Flintstones Christmas Carol	Layout designer
1995–1996	Freakazoid!	Prop design
1995–1996	The Sylvester & Tweety Mysteries	Prop design
1995–1996	What a Cartoon!	Background designer, background layout artist, layout designer
1996	Dexter's Laboratory	Background design ("The Big Sister")
1996	Timon & Pumbaa	Key layout designer
1997	Loose Tooth	Animation story developer
1997	101 Dalmatians: The Series	Key layout designer
1999	Mickey Mouse Works	Art director
2001	The Powerpuff Girls	Layout keys
2001–2003	House of Mouse	Key layout designer
2002	Mickey's House of Villains	Key layout designer
2002–2003	Clone High	Creative consultant
2003	The Powerpuff Girls: 'Twas the Fight Before Christmas	Background designer
2004–2007	Foster's Home for Imaginary Friends	Art director, background painter, property designer, color styling
2009	Team Smithereen	Thanks
2011	A Chair Is a Chair	Digital effects
2024	Good Times: Black Again	Head of adult animation: Netflix

=== Video games ===
Year	Title	Role
2002	Disney's Stitch: Experiment 626	Art director
2008	LittleBigPlanet	Background designer
2009	LittleBigPlanet	Background designer
2010	Sackboy's Prehistoric Moves	Background designer
2011	LittleBigPlanet 2	Background designer
2012	LittleBigPlanet PS Vita	Background designer
2012	LittleBigPlanet Karting	Background designer
2014	Run Sackboy! Run!	Background designer
2014	LittleBigPlanet 3	Background designer

== Awards and nominations ==
Year	Award	Category	Work	Shared with	Result	Ref
1997	Annie Awards	Best Individual Achievement: Production Design in a TV Production	Timon & Pumbaa (for "Bumble in the Jungle")	—	Nominated	
2000	Daytime Emmy Awards	Outstanding Individual in Animation	Mickey Mouse Works (for "Hansel and Gretel")	—	Won	
2005	Primetime Emmy Awards	Outstanding Individual Achievement in Animation	Foster's Home for Imaginary Friends (for "House of Bloos")	—	Won	
2006	Annie Awards	Best Production Design in an Animated Television Production	Foster's Home for Imaginary Friends (for "A Lost Claus")	Craig McCracken, Dave Dunnet, Martin Ansolabehere	Won	
2024	Black Reel Awards for Television	Outstanding TV Movie or Limited Series	Entergalactic	Michael Penketh	Nominated	
