= Hair Today, Gone Tomorrow =

Hair Today, Gone Tomorrow is the title of several cartoons:

- Season 4, Episode 40 of The Harveytoons Show
- Season 11, Episode 211 of King of the Hill
- Season 2, Episode 7 of Shaun the Sheep
- "Hair Today, Gone Tomorrow", a 2007 short cartoon from Foster's Home for Imaginary Friends
- Season 1, Episode 19 of Middlemost Post
- Season 1, Episode 1 of Dennis The Menace
