= Good Wilt Hunting =

- Foster's Home for Imaginary Friends episodes
- Episode nos.: Season 4 Episodes 12 and 13
- Directed by: Craig McCracken; Robert Alvarez (Note: Animation); Eric Pringle; Robert Cullen
- Written by: Lauren Faust
- Story by: Craig McCracken; Lauren Faust; Darrick Bachman; Craig Lewis
- Production codes: 411; 412
- Original air date: November 23, 2006
- Running time: 44 minutes

Episode chronology
← Previous "Make Believe It or Not"	Next → "Cheese a Go-Go"

"Good Wilt Hunting" is a 44-minute long animated television film, starring the cast of Foster's Home for Imaginary Friends. It originally aired on Cartoon Network during Thanksgiving Day on November 23, 2006.

== Plot ==
Every five years, Madame Foster arranges a reunion of the imaginary friends with their creators. Wilt, whose creator is unknown and has never come to the reunion, becomes unusually distressed. The night after the first day of the reunion, Wilt packs a knapsack and makes a call to an antagonistic figure from his past, declaring he'll meet them in two days. When an overhearing Bloo asks, Wilt tells him he did "something terrible" that he needs to set right. The Foster's crew is baffled that Wilt left without telling anyone beforehand or leaving any clues. This results in a chase around the world, in which Bloo, Mac, Eduardo, Coco, and Frankie, joined by Eduardo's creator, police officer Nina Valerosa, and Douglas and Adam, two nebbish scientists who discovered Coco, attempt to bring Wilt back home.

Along the way, Wilt gets off track when he helps out a variety of individuals in a town. Eventually, Wilt gets arrested for accidentally assisting some burglars when they moved some furniture to their truck. While in prison, Wilt shares his history with the inmates; his creator imagined him to help him become a better basketball player and the two became undefeated, but a local bully imagined his own imaginary friend, Foul Larry, to beat them and they lost. The following morning, the Foster's gang checks out of a motel, and are about to give up on their mission and just hope that Wilt decides to come back in the near future. They discover the same three criminals trying to hijack the bus. After finding out that Wilt is in jail, the group head over there only to find out that Wilt was freed in return for mowing all of the lawns in a nearby suburban area during his journey. At this point, the group assumes that Wilt must be after his original creator, and Mac then discovers that Wilt's creator is in Japan.

Meanwhile, Wilt finally arrives at the basketball court he and his creator used to play at. There, he is greeted by an imaginary friend from his past: a basketball scoreboard friend named Stats. Wilt reveals that he is back for a rematch against a hostile basketball-headed friend, Foul Larry (a parody of Larry Bird that plays on the term fowl), whose aggressive maneuvers led to him nearly falling on and crushing Wilt's creator, and causing Wilt’s deformities when he took the blow instead. The loss upset his creator and spurred Wilt to leave from shame. Despite this, Wilt loses the match again when a hand pulls out of the same situation Wilt saved him from. As Wilt lies down on the ground in defeat, he is greeted by his friends and his creator Jordan Michaels (a parody of Michael Jordan). Jordan explains to Wilt that he was never upset with Wilt, but only with himself. He stated that he looked for him everywhere after that game three decades ago but was unable to find him, and explained how he not only made him a better basketball player, but made him a better person. In return, Jordan offers Wilt fame and a place to stay in his mansion. However, Wilt decides to stay back at Foster's so he could someday be adopted by another kid, and the film ends with Wilt and Jordan playing a lopsided game of one-on-one basketball at Foster's as the 5-year creator reunion comes to an end and Foul Larry, Stats, and other imaginary friends from Wilt's neighborhood move in.

During the credits, Wilt, Bloo, Mac, Eduardo, Coco, Frankie, and Mr. Herriman watch Jordan playing basketball during one of his professional games, with Wilt cheering Jordan and heckling the referee and opposition as the film ends.

== Production ==
The episode was unveiled by the network in Spring 2006.

== Reception ==
The episode kicked off a Thanksgiving marathon of the series to celebrate the show's float appearance at Macy's Thanksgiving Day Parade. The special attracted 10.5 million unique viewers.

Dave Dunnet, the background designer for the episode, won an Individual Achievement Emmy for his role in the episode.
