= House of Bloo's =

- Foster's Home for Imaginary Friends episodes
- Title card for Part 1
- Episode nos.: Season 1 Episodes 1–3
- Directed by: Craig McCracken; Robert Alvarez (animation); Randy Myers (animation)
- Written by: Craig McCracken
- Story by: Craig McCracken; Lauren Faust; Craig Lewis; Amy Keating Rogers
- Production codes: 101; 102; 103
- Original air date: August 13, 2004
- Running time: 63 minutes

Episode chronology
← Previous —	Next → "Store Wars"

"House of Bloo's" is the collective name for the series premiere of the animated television series Foster's Home for Imaginary Friends. The episode's plot follows Mac, an eight-year-old boy who is pressured by his mother to abandon his imaginary friend Blooregard Q. Kazoo, on the grounds that he is too old for him. Upon seeing an ad on television for an orphanage for imaginary friends, Bloo convinces Mac to let him reside in the house so then Mac can visit him every day. Various intrigues and troubles arise with Mac's brother Terrence and imaginary friend Duchess.

It premiered on Cartoon Network on August 13, 2004. The episode was written and directed by series creator Craig McCracken, with further story work by his then-fiancée Lauren Faust and screenwriters Craig Lewis and Amy Keating Rogers. The episode debuted to positive reviews and high ratings.

== Plot ==
Mac, an 8-year-old boy, and his imaginary friend, Blooregard Q. Kazoo ("Bloo"), often get into fights with his 13-year-old brother, Terrence. Mac's mother is tired of this behavior, so she tells him that he has outgrown his age to have an imaginary friend and must get rid of Bloo. Crushed by overhearing their argument, except for Terrence, who is rather pleased, Bloo later comes across a TV commercial for "Foster's Home for Imaginary Friends"—"where good ideas are not forgotten," according to the motto.

The next day, Mac and Bloo stop by the sprawling mansion and are met by Mr. Herriman, the strict business manager. After Bloo explains the situation in comically exaggerated detail, they are arranged to be given a tour of the house. Frankie, the caregiver, is about to show Mac and Bloo around; however, she is soon called away by the ill-tempered, high-maintenance resident Duchess. Basketball-loving Wilt takes over the tour and introduces Mac and Bloo to the wide variety of imaginary friends living in the house. Along the way, they meet Coco, who lays plastic eggs when she gets excited and only says "Coco" when she speaks, and the fearsome-looking but soft-hearted Eduardo. Mac and Bloo think Foster's will be a good place for Bloo to live. However, Frankie tells them that if he stays there, he will be eligible for adoption whenever Mac is not around. Mac promises to stop by after school and departs, taking Coco's eggs with him and leaving Bloo alone with his new housemates, who show him their bedroom where he will be sleeping. Seeing Bloo about to sleep on the floor, Wilt lets him take his bunk in exchange for sleeping on the floor, and they all fall asleep for the night.

The next day, a wealthy couple stops by Foster's to find a friend for their spoiled daughter. Frankie sees a perfect chance to get Duchess out of the house for good. Just as Mr. Herriman is getting ready to do the paperwork for the adoption, though, the wealthy couple's daughter catches sight of Bloo and starts chasing him. Wilt, Coco, and Eduardo race all over the house to keep Bloo out of reach, but the married couple's daughter finally snatches him away and shows him to her parents. They agree, but only Mac's last-minute arrival saves him. The millionaires leave empty-handed, while Duchess becomes even angrier at not being able to leave Foster's, which she refers to as a dump, due to Bloo's interference.

Terrence, meanwhile, has been watching from behind the bushes across the street and realizes that Mac has not gotten rid of Bloo. He and Duchess join forces to do away with their common enemy. As Mac is on his way to Foster's the next day, Terrence keeps him from reaching Foster's, carries him back home, and locks him in his bedroom closet. Terrence then pays his own visit, dressed to make a good impression. Duchess creates a diversion by provoking one of the Extremeasauruses (dangerous, monstrous imaginary friends created by teenagers), leaving Bloo alone with Terrence.

Mac finds Coco's eggs in the closet and gets some tools from them that he needs to make his escape. He is too late to stop the adoption from going through, but he and the others soon realize that Terrence and Duchess are working together. That evening, Terrence takes Bloo to a junkyard. He meets Duchess, who plans to feed Bloo to an Extremeasaurus she freed earlier as revenge for unintentionally foiling her chance of being adopted. They are thwarted by the arrival of Mac and company, who manage to save Bloo and trick the monster into turning on its masters.

Once everyone is back at Foster's, Mr. Herriman apologizes to Mac for his earlier misjudgment. He acknowledges him as being truly dedicated to Bloo, as well as the imaginary friends of Foster's. However, as grateful as he is for Mac's key role in averting disaster, he still cannot allow Bloo to stay indefinitely and not be adopted. Frankie, as well as all the other friends present, argue in protest of this. The conflict ceases upon hearing footsteps. There, Mac and Bloo are surprised by the arrival of its founder, Madame Foster herself. She announces that Bloo can live there permanently and never be put up for adoption as long as Mac visits him every day. Although Mr. Herriman is unhappy with this as it defies the house rules, Foster dismisses this. As for Duchess, her punishment is to be forced to stay at Foster's, the place she hates so much, while Terrence finds himself at the mercy of a herd of annoyed unicorns, whom he had taunted earlier during the junkyard fight.

== Production ==
Craig McCracken created Foster's Home for Imaginary Friends and the episode, serving as writer and director. McCracken conceived the series upon adopting two dogs from an animal shelter with his then-fiancée Lauren Faust; he wondered what their life was like before adoption and applied the concept to that of imaginary friends. Animation for the show was done on Adobe Flash after hand-drawn artwork was processed on Illustrator. Character composition was done on After Effects.

== Reception ==
Anita Gates of The New York Times praised the episode and stated that the series would promise to be an "admirable tale of loyalty and adventure-based learning with a contagious sense of fun".

=== Awards ===
McCracken and Mike Moon won an Emmy Award for Outstanding Achievement in Animation in 2005 for their work in the episode. The show also received an Annie Award nomination for Best Character Design in an Animated Television Production.
