= Randy Myers (animator) =

American animator and animation director (born 1967)

- Born: March 29, 1967 (age 59); Panorama City, Los Angeles, California, U.S.
- Occupations: Animator, animation director
- Years active: 1994–present
- Known for: Dexter's Laboratory; The Powerpuff Girls; Samurai Jack; My Life as a Teenage Robot; The Fairly OddParents; We Bare Bears

Randy Myers (born March 29, 1967) is an American animator and animation director, known for his animation direction work on the television series Samurai Jack and The Powerpuff Girls.

His other works include The Grim Adventures of Billy & Mandy, Foster's Home for Imaginary Friends, Dexter's Laboratory, Cats Don't Dance, The Iron Giant, My Life as a Teenage Robot, The Fairly OddParents, G.I. Joe: Renegades, among others. He was the supervising producer on We Bare Bears.

He attended CalArts from 1990-1992, befriending classmates Genndy Tartakovsky, Craig McCracken, and Rob Renzetti.

== Awards ==
In 2004, he won a Primetime Emmy Award for Outstanding Animated Program for his direction of Samurai Jack.

In 2005, Myers won an Emmy Award for Outstanding Animated Program for his work on the television miniseries Star Wars: Clone Wars.

== See also ==
- List of animators
- List of film and television directors
- List of people from Los Angeles
