= Foster's Home for Imaginary Friends =

American animated television series

- Genre: Fantasy; Comedy; Adventure; Animated sitcom
- Created by: Craig McCracken
- Developed by: Craig McCracken; Lauren Faust; Mike Moon
- Directed by: Craig McCraken; Robert Alvarez; Rob Renzetti (Note: "Destination: Imagination"); Eric Pringle (seasons 3–6); Various (seasons 1–4)
- Voices of: Sean Marquette; Keith Ferguson; Phil LaMarr; Tom Kenny; Candi Milo; Grey DeLisle; Tom Kane
- Theme music composer: James L. Venable
- Composers: James L. Venable; Jennifer Kes Remington
- Country of origin: United States
- Original language: English
- No. of seasons: 6
- No. of episodes: 79 (Note: Includes 82 segments and 18 shorts) (list of episodes)

Production
- Executive producers: Brian A. Miller; Craig McCracken
- Producers: Vincent Aniceto; Ryan Slater
- Running time: 21–66 minutes
- Production company: Cartoon Network Studios (Note: Animation outsourced to Boulder Media.)

Original release
- Network: Cartoon Network
- Release: August 13, 2004 – May 3, 2009

Related
- The Powerpuff Girls

Foster's Home for Imaginary Friends (Note: Commonly shortened to simply Foster's) is an American animated television series created by Craig McCracken for Cartoon Network. Produced by Cartoon Network Studios, it was the network's first series primarily animated using Adobe Flash. Production took place in Burbank, California, with additional animation services provided by Boulder Media in Ireland.

Set in a world where imaginary friends coexist with humans, the series follows Mac, an eight-year-old boy who is forced by his mother to give up his imaginary friend, Bloo. After discovering an orphanage for abandoned imaginary friends, Bloo moves in and is allowed to remain there on the condition that Mac visits him every day. Episodes center on their interactions with the home's residents and staff, as everyday situations often lead to unexpected predicaments.

McCracken conceived the series with his partner, Lauren Faust, after the two adopted dogs from an animal shelter, inspiring the concept of abandoned imaginary friends. The series premiered on Cartoon Network on August 13, 2004, with a 90-minute television film, and concluded on May 3, 2009, after six seasons and 79 episodes. McCracken departed the network shortly after the series ended.

Foster's Home for Imaginary Friends received critical acclaim and received numerous industry accolades, including five Annie Awards and seven Emmy Awards, winning a total of 12 awards from 35 nominations. It has since been named one of the best Cartoon Network series by Entertainment Weekly and was ranked among the top animated series by IGN, placing at number 85.

A spinoff, Foster's Funtime for Imaginary Friends, was first reported to be in development on July 18, 2022, and was officially greenlit on June 12, 2024. It is produced by Hanna-Barbera Studios Europe, with McCracken returning as creator. The spinoff, aimed at a preschool audience, features a new cast of young imaginary friends alongside Bloo and Madame Foster from the original series.

== Premise ==
Foster's Home for Imaginary Friends is set in a universe where childhood imaginary friends physically manifest and become real as soon as they are imagined. When children outgrow them, these friends are relocated to the titular orphanage, where they reside until they are adopted by other children. The home is operated by its elderly founder, Madame Foster; her imaginary rabbit companion, Mr. Herriman, a strict rule follower who serves as the house's business manager; and her granddaughter Frankie, who manages its day-to-day operations.

The series centers on Mac, an eight-year-old boy who is forced by his mother to give up his imaginary friend, Bloo, believing he is too old for such companionship. After seeing a television advertisement, Mac brings Bloo to Foster's, only to discover that its residents are available for adoption. Determined to keep his friend, Mac persuades Frankie, Mr. Herriman, and Madame Foster to allow Bloo to remain at the home on the condition that he visits him every day.

Episodes follow the intelligent Mac and the mischievous Bloo as they navigate life at Foster's alongside a diverse cast of eccentric residents and staff, often finding themselves in humorous, unpredictable situations.

== Characters ==
The main characters of the show. From left to right: Coco, Bloo, Mac, Eduardo, Frankie Foster, and Wilt.

=== Main ===
- Mac (voiced by Sean Marquette) – A bright and imaginative eight-year-old boy who created Bloo and remains his best friend. He visits Foster's every day. Deeply attached to Bloo, Mac fears being separated from him. Often serving as the voice of reason, he contrasts with his friends' more impulsive behavior. He becomes extremely hyperactive after consuming sugar and is shown to have a crush on Frankie.
- Bloo (voiced by Keith Ferguson) – Mac's imaginary friend. Bloo is self-centered and egotistical, frequently getting into trouble. Despite this, he is capable of remorse and occasionally demonstrates loyalty to his friends. He enjoys playing paddle ball and often boasts about his skill, despite rarely succeeding.
- Wilt (voiced by Phil LaMarr) – A very tall, gentle, and excessively polite imaginary friend with only one arm and a crooked eye-stalk. His passive nature often leads others to take advantage of him. A devoted basketball player, Wilt was formerly the imaginary friend of Jordan Michaels, a parody of Michael Jordan. He lost his arm and injured his eye while saving Jordan during a game and later left out of guilt. Years later, he reunites with his creator, who expresses gratitude rather than disappointment.
- Eduardo (voiced by Tom Kenny) – A large, purple, horned monster created by a young girl named Nina Valerosa to protect her. Despite his intimidating appearance and great strength, Eduardo is gentle, timid, and easily frightened. However, he becomes fierce when defending his friends.
- Coco (voiced by Candi Milo) – A bird-like imaginary friend with a palm tree-like head who can only say her name. Despite this limitation, she communicates effectively and can lay eggs containing various objects. Though eccentric, she is often portrayed as intelligent and kind. Her origins are unknown; she was discovered on a South Pacific island by two scientists named Adam and Douglas.
- Frances "Frankie" Foster (voiced by Grey DeLisle) – Madame Foster's 22-year-old granddaughter and the home's primary caretaker. Referred to as "Miss Frances" by Mr. Herriman, she manages the home's daily operations. Frankie is friendly, responsible, and hardworking, though she occasionally becomes frustrated with Bloo and Mr. Herriman. According to her driver's license, she was born on July 25, 1984.
- Mr. Herriman (voiced by Tom Kane) – An elderly anthropomorphic lop-eared rabbit imagined by Madame Foster. He speaks with an English accent and dresses formally in a tailcoat, white gloves, top hat, and monocle. Acting as the home's business manager, he strictly enforces rules and order. He frequently reprimands Bloo and criticizes Frankie despite her diligence.
- Madame Foster (voiced by Candi Milo) – The energetic and kind-hearted founder of Foster's and Frankie's grandmother. As Mr. Herriman's creator, she retains a childlike spirit despite her age and often engages in playful or mischievous behavior.

Other recurring characters include Terrence (voiced by Tara Strong), Mac's bullying older brother; Duchess (voiced by DeLisle), a narcissistic friend with a cubist appearance; Cheese (voiced by Milo), a dim-witted yellow friend introduced in season two; and Goo (voiced by DeLisle), an imaginative and talkative girl who constantly creates new imaginary friends, introduced in season three.

== Episodes ==
| Season | Episodes | Originally released | |
| Season | Episodes | First released | Last released |
|---|---|---|---|
| 1 | 13 (Note: 14 segments; episode 10 contains two 11-minute segments; "Seeing Red / Phone Home") | August 13, 2004 | October 22, 2004 |
| 2 | 13 (Note: 15 segments; episodes 3 and 4 contain two 11-minute segments; "Where There's a Wilt, There's a Way / Everyone Knows It's Bendy" and "Sight for Sore Eyes / Bloo's Brothers") | January 21, 2005 | July 15, 2005 |
| 3 | 14 | July 22, 2005 | March 24, 2006 |
| 4 | 13 | April 28, 2006 | November 23, 2006 |
| Shorts | 18 | June 9, 2006 | August 7, 2007 |
| 5 | 13 | May 4, 2007 | March 6, 2008 |
| 6 | 13 | March 13, 2008 | May 3, 2009 |

== Production ==
"We wondered what their life was like before they came to us, and I thought, 'You could apply that to imaginary friends as well.'"

— Craig McCracken on adopting two dogs and coming up with the idea for the series

The series was created by Craig McCracken, who had also created The Powerpuff Girls for Cartoon Network. McCracken developed the idea for the series after adopting two dogs from an animal shelter with his then-fiancée Lauren Faust and Mike Moon; he adapted the concept of pet adoption to that of imaginary friends. The show has an art style which is meant to evoke, according to McCracken, "that period of late 60's psychedelia when Victorian stylings were coming into trippy poster designs". McCracken wanted Foster's to be similar to The Muppet Show, which he believed was a "fun, character driven show that the whole family could enjoy".

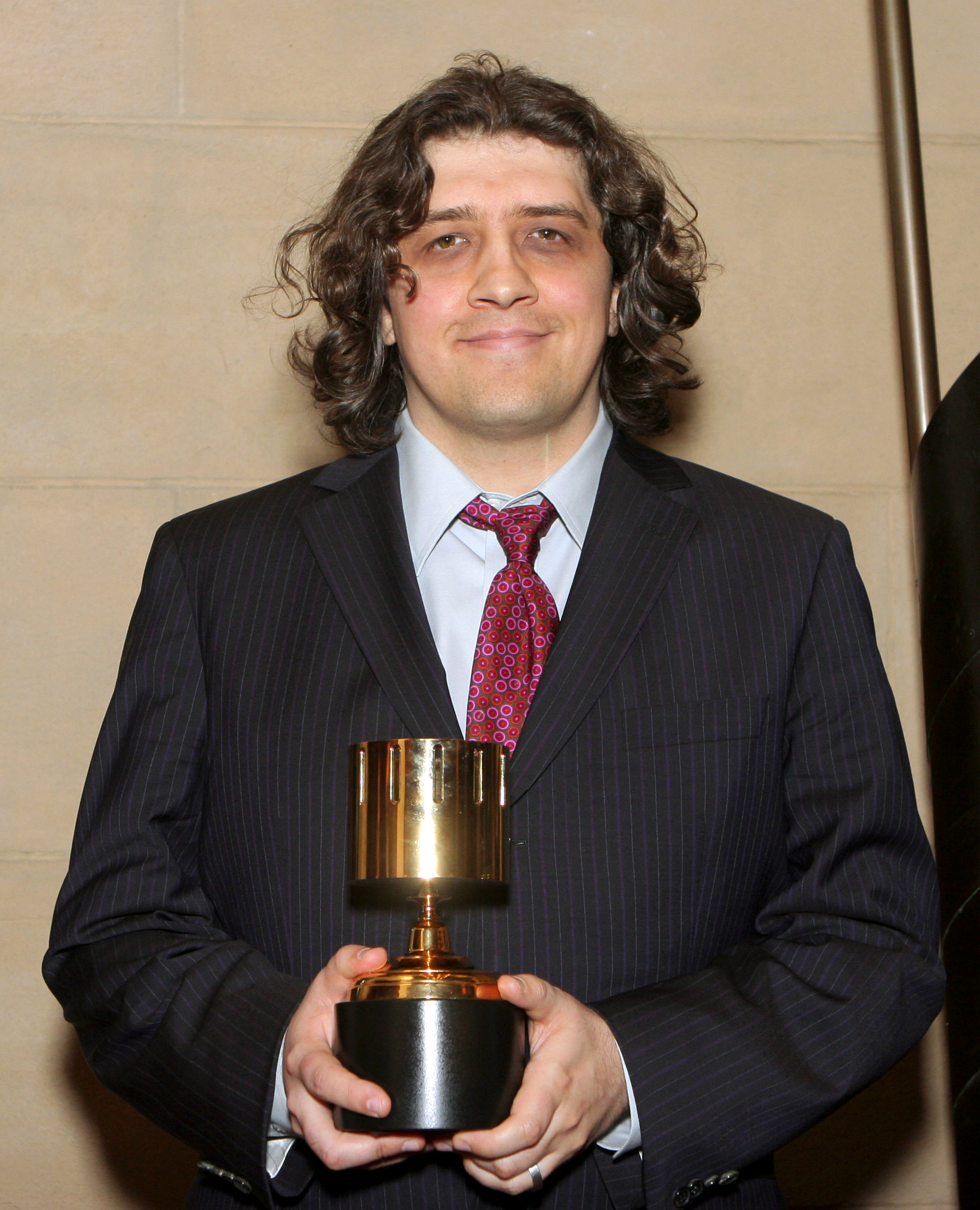
Craig McCracken in 2007 holding the Annie Award won by Foster's Home for Imaginary Friends as Best Animated TV Production.

Animation for the show was done using a process involving Adobe software Illustrator, Flash and After Effects. McCracken directed, executive produced and story edited the series. Most of the episodes were produced and animated at Cartoon Network Studios in Burbank, California, while the rest were animated at Boulder Media Limited in Dublin, Ireland. The theme song was composed by James L. Venable, who had originally collaborated with McCracken on The Powerpuff Girls. Craig described the music as "psychedelic ragtime". Additional music was composed by Venable and Jennifer Kes Remington.

Collette Sunderman was the casting and recording director for the show. Sean Marquette was cast as Mac, and Keith Ferguson was cast as Bloo. The Powerpuff Girls voice actors Tom Kane, Tom Kenny and Tara Strong were cast in Foster's as Mr. Herriman, Eduardo and Terrence, respectively. Grey DeLisle was cast as Frankie Foster, Phil LaMarr was cast as Wilt, and Candi Milo was cast as Coco and Madame Foster. From season two onwards, Milo also lent her voice to Cheese. DeLisle also voiced Goo after the character's debut in season three.

Foster's Home for Imaginary Friends premiered on August 13, 2004, as a 90-minute special titled "House of Bloo's". The series' run began on August 20 in its normal time slot of Fridays at 7:00 PM. The special was Cartoon Network's highest-rated premiere at the time. 18 shorts were produced from 2006 to 2007. In addition to the premiere episode, two other specials were produced: "Good Wilt Hunting", which premiered on November 23, 2006, and "Destination: Imagination", which premiered on November 27, 2008. The final episode, titled "Goodbye to Bloo", aired on May 3, 2009, preceded by a 6-hour marathon of other episodes from the series. McCracken expressed a certain sadness at the series' end, but stated that he was "crazy proud of the work" that he and the production team had done "on Foster's and the fact that it worked just the way [they] wanted it to". During its original run, Foster's was one of Cartoon Network's highest-rated shows. The show proved to be popular among both younger and older audiences.

== Reception ==
=== Critical response ===
Anita Gates of The New York Times praised the series' premiere 1 1/2-hour episode and stated that the series would promise to be an "admirable tale of loyalty and adventure-based learning with a contagious sense of fun". Mike Pinsky, in a review on DVD Verdict, praised the art design and the characterizations, particularly singling out Cheese as possibly "the quintessence of Foster's surreal charm" in his Season 2 review. David Cornelius of DVD Talk called the series "one of the best shows of any kind [then] on television, a winner for viewers of any age" and "a wildly inventive mix of creative wonder, comic genius, and well-crafted chaos". In a Season 2 review, also on DVD Talk, Cornelius called the show "flat-out perfect". Joly Herman of Common Sense Media, an advocacy group focused on appropriate technology and media for children, was less enthusiastic about the show, rating it 2 stars out of 5. Herman praised the creativity and diversity of the characters and the show's premise, but criticized the storyline and writing, which presented "confusing messages" for young children.

The series was named the 85th best animated series of all time in a list of the top 100 animated series by IGN, which called it very funny and endearing. Entertainment Weekly named the show the sixth best Cartoon Network show in their top 10 list, praising its "catchy magical-realist setting" and the characters "you genuinely learned to care about".

=== Awards ===
Foster's Home for Imaginary Friends received many industry accolades. The series received 12 awards out of a total of 35 nominations. At the Annie Awards, the show received a total of 20 nominations from 2004 to 2009, and won 5, including Best Animated Television Production in 2007. At the Emmy Awards, the show received nine nominations, and won seven awards, including five Outstanding Individual Achievements in Animation and one Outstanding Animated Program (For Programming One Hour or More) award. At the 2005 Pulcinella Awards, Foster's received the award for Best TV Series for All Audiences and Bloo was named "Best Character of the Year." At the 22nd TCA Awards, the show received a nomination for Outstanding Achievement in Children's Programming. At the 2007 Ottawa International Animation Festival, the series won Best Television Animation for Children.

== Merchandising and media ==
=== Video games ===
There are 2 video games based on Foster's Home for Imaginary Friends. The first has the same name as the show and was developed by Collision Studios and published by Crave Entertainment for the Game Boy Advance. It was released on October 17, 2006. In the game, players control Mac or Bloo while collecting items to complete objectives. Jack Devries of IGN rated it a 5 1/2 out of 10, stating that it "falls short" and is "skippable". The second game, titled Foster's Home for Imaginary Friends: Imagination Invaders, was developed by Sensory Sweep and published by Midway on November 12, 2007, for the Nintendo DS. In the game, the player controls Bloo, who performs tasks and completes quests while fighting against "Space Nut Boogies". Devries rated it 4 out of 10, calling it "terrible to play" and "completely worthless". Characters from the show also appear on the games Cartoon Network: Punch Time Explosion and FusionFall.

On May 15, 2006, Cartoon Network introduced an online game, Big Fat Awesome House Party, which allowed players to create an online friend to join Bloo and the others in a one-year game online, earning points that would give them gifts, cards and other online "merchandise" for their albums. A player's friend, made from one of over 900,000 possible characters, could wind up in a future episode of Foster's. Over 13 million users were registered to play the game after its launch in May 2006. Because of its success and popularity, Cartoon Network announced in May 2007 that the game would continue for six more months, into November of that year.

=== Promotions and products ===
From 2006 to 2008, Cartoon Network made a Foster's Home for Imaginary Friends float as part of the Macy's Thanksgiving Day Parade. The float was fashioned as a replica of the home. On Thanksgiving Day, 2006, characters from the show performed the Beatles' "With a Little Help from My Friends". In 2007, the characters performed "You're My Best Friend" by Queen. In 2008, the characters' performance of Harry Nilsson's theme song to The Courtship of Eddie's Father later reused for Rob & Big was interrupted by Rick Astley singing "Never Gonna Give You Up", reproducing the Internet phenomenon of Rickrolling.

In 2006, the network promoted the show with billboards that read "I pooted" and "I'm a hot toe picker" (as said by Cheese and Bloo, respectively) in about 25 cities within the United States, one being placed next to Interstate 40/85 through Greensboro, North Carolina. Some time later, one of the "I pooted" billboards (along U.S. Route 29) was taken down due to concerns by the North Carolina A&T State University. One of their associates, who claimed the advertisement did not represent their purpose and mission, said that "some people didn't understand if this was something in connection with the university." Both parties came to an agreement, and the billboard was replaced with one that read "Shiny, shiny. Pretty, pretty", a line from the cartoon My Gym Partner's a Monkey.

In March 2006, toys of characters from the show were featured in Burger King's Kids Meals. In December 2007, Cartoon Network and Hot Topic retail stores in the United States set up a boutique for a product line based on the series, with over 693 locations featuring products such as clothing, accessories and DVD releases by Warner Home Video.

=== Home media ===
The episodes from the series are available for digital purchase on iTunes and Amazon Video, with the exception of the Christmas special. The show's second season was available on Netflix until March 2015. All 6 seasons were added to Hulu in May 2015 until its removal from the service on October 1, 2022. The show was available to watch on HBO Max from May 2020 until it was removed in May 2023.

| DVD title | Season(s) | Episode count | Release date |
|---|---|---|---|
| Codename: Kids Next Door: Sooper Hugest Missions: File 1 | 1 | 3 | October 26, 2004 (Region 1) |
Features "House of Bloo's" as a bonus feature.
| Cartoon Network Halloween 3: Sweet Sweet Fear! | 1 | 1 | September 12, 2006 (Region 1) |
Features "Bloooo".
| Cartoon Network Fridays | 2 | 1 | September 19, 2006 (Region 1) |
Features "Bloo's Brothers".
| Cartoon Network Christmas 3 | 1 | 1 | October 3, 2006 (Region 1) |
Features "Store Wars".
| The Complete 1st Season | 1 | 13 | March 6, 2007 (Regions 1 and 4) |
This two-disc release contained the entire first season in production code order.
| The Complete 2nd Season | 2 | 13 | September 11, 2007 (Regions 1 and 4) |
This two-disc release contained the entire second season in production code order.
| Cartoon Network: Mash-Up | 1 | 1 | August 10, 2009 (Region 2) |
Features "Store Wars".
| The Complete 3rd Season | 3 | 13 or 14 | May 5, 2010 (Region 4); November 12, 2014 (manufacture on demand in Region 1) |
This two-disc release contained the entire third season.
| 4 Kid Favorites: The Hall of Fame Collection Volume 2 | 1 | 8 | March 12, 2013 (Region 1) |
Features "House of Bloo's" (included in Codename: Kids Next Door: Sooper Hugest Missions: File 1), and Foster's Home for Imaginary Friends: The Complete Season 1, Disc 2.
| 4 Kid Favorites: The Hall of Fame Collection Volume 3 | 1 | 3 | June 23, 2015 |
Features "House of Bloo's" (included in Codename: Kids Next Door: Sooper Hugest Missions: File 1).
| The Complete Series | 1-6 | 79 | October 18, 2022 |
11-disc release containing the complete series.

=== In other series ===
Mac and Bloo make a cameo appearance in The Powerpuff Girls Rule!!!. Bloo, Wilt, Frankie, Eduardo, and Cheese also appear in the Jellystone special "Crisis of the Infinite Mirths" along with other Cartoon Network characters. Only Tom Kenny, Candi Milo, and Grey DeLisle reprise their roles from the original series, as Bloo and Wilt appear mute. However, Wilt's name appears in the credits, despite Phil LaMarr only respiring his roles as Hector Con Carne from Grim & Evil and the title character from Samurai Jack.
