= Lauren Faust =

American animator, writer, voice director, and storyboard artist

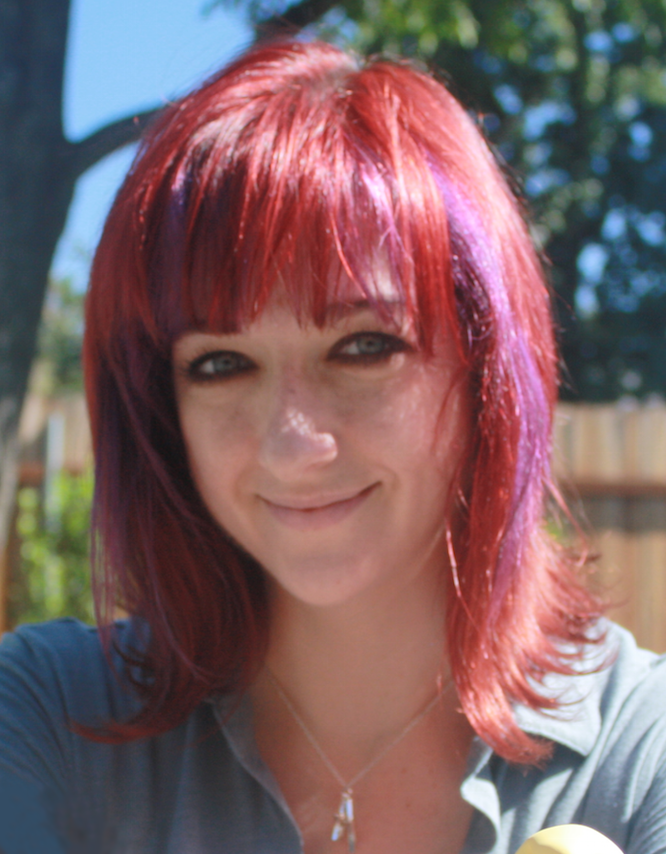
- Faust in 2014
- Born: Lauren J. Faust; July 25, 1974 (age 52); San Jose, California, U.S.
- Education: California Institute of the Arts
- Occupations: Animator, writer, storyboard artist
- Years active: 1994–present
- Known for: My Little Pony: Friendship Is Magic; DC Super Hero Girls
- Spouse: Craig McCracken (m. 2004)
- Children: 1
- Awards: 2009 Primetime Emmy Award

Lauren J. Faust (born July 25, 1974) is an American animator, writer, director, and producer. She is known for developing the animated series My Little Pony: Friendship Is Magic and DC Super Hero Girls. Faust has collaborated with her husband Craig McCracken on his four animated series The Powerpuff Girls, Foster's Home for Imaginary Friends, Wander Over Yonder, and Kid Cosmic.

== Career ==
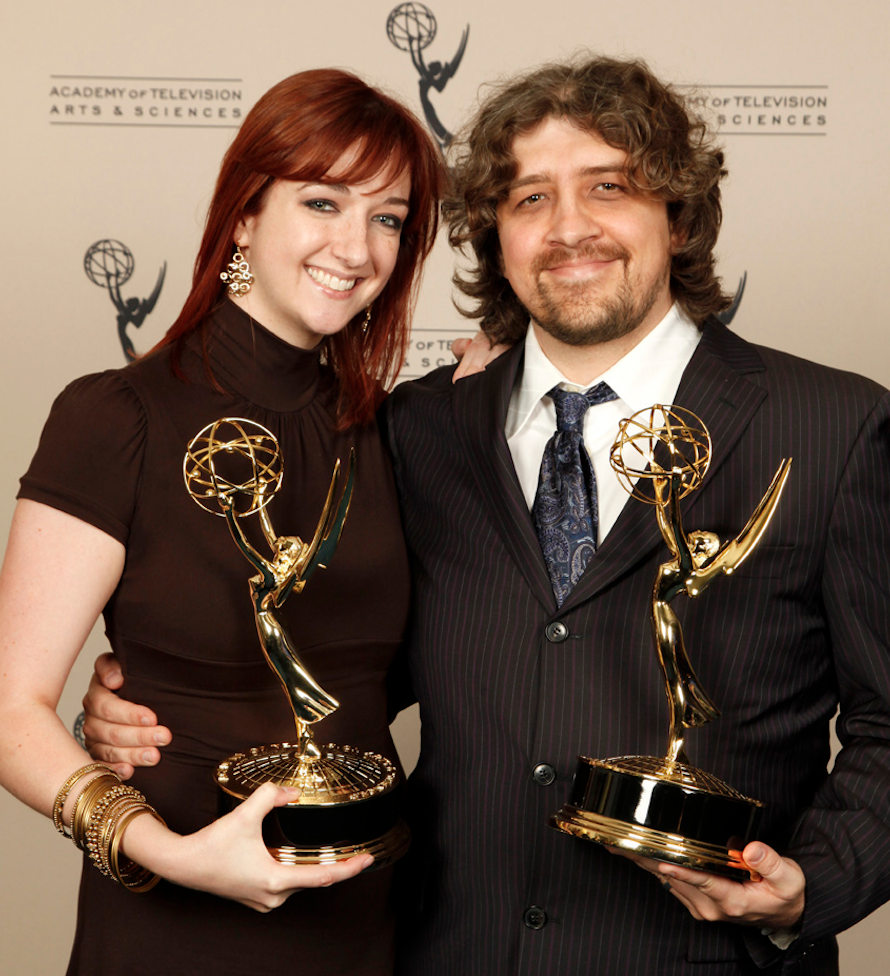
Faust and her husband Craig McCracken at the Emmy Awards in 2008

Faust attended the California Institute of Arts from 1992 to 1994. She started working in the animation industry as a character layouts artist for the character Julie from the MTV animated television series The Maxx, before becoming an animator at Turner Feature Animation and Warner Bros Feature Animation, where she worked as an animator on feature films such as Cats Don't Dance, Quest for Camelot, and The Iron Giant.

Faust shifted to television animation in 1999, working on The Powerpuff Girls and Foster's Home for Imaginary Friends at Cartoon Network Studios as a storyboard artist, screenwriter, supervising producer, story supervisor. Faust created and developed the toy line Milky Way and the Galaxy Girls.

Faust worked with Hasbro to develop the company's My Little Pony property, resulting in the series My Little Pony: Friendship Is Magic. The series proved to be a major success not only with the primary young audience, but also significantly among adults and teenagers, who became popularly known as "bronies". She developed Super Best Friends Forever for Warner Brothers, and Medusa for Sony Pictures Animation, though Sony changed the creative direction of Medusa, with Faust leaving the project. She worked with her husband Craig McCracken on Wander Over Yonder for Disney and Kid Cosmic for Netflix.

Faust worked with Warner Bros. in 2019 to develop a reboot of DC Super Hero Girls. As of 2021, she was developing an animated series for Netflix Animation, called Toil & Trouble. However, the series was cancelled by August of that year due to a change in leadership. Faust mentioned in April 2022 that she managed to retain the rights to the show, and was hoping some other network would pick it up eventually.

In 2011, Faust offered to design new characters for the fangame My Little Pony: Fighting is Magic after a cease and desist from Hasbro. The new characters became the basis for Them's Fightin' Herds, which was successfully funded on Indiegogo and was released to Early Access on Steam in 2018. The game left Early Access in 2020, when the first chapter of story mode was released. In November 2023, it was announced that after the completion and release of in-development DLC playable fighters, active development of the game would cease, including the rest of the story mode, of which the entire plot outline had already been written. Faust herself expressed disappointment at this news, wondering if perhaps a "show or a comic" could be made out of the existing story that had already been written.

== Awards ==
In 2004, Faust was nominated for an Emmy Award. In 2005, she was nominated for an Annie Award. In 2009, she shared a Primetime Emmy for the Foster's Home for Imaginary Friends special "Destination: Imagination".

== Personal life ==
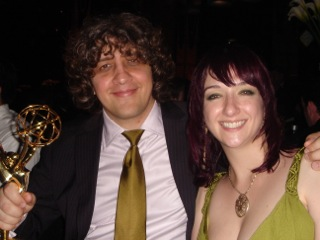
Craig McCracken and Lauren Faust in 2003

Faust is married to Craig McCracken, creator of The Powerpuff Girls, Foster's Home for Imaginary Friends, and Wander Over Yonder. They met while they were working on the third season of The Powerpuff Girls. Faust has worked with her husband on all of his shows. She considers herself a lifelong feminist. Faust took maternity leave in mid-2016 to take care of her newborn daughter.

== Filmography ==
=== Films ===
Year	Title	Role
1994	Home, Honey, I'm High	Voice
1997	Cats Don't Dance	Animator – "Sawyer"
1998	Quest for Camelot	Animator – United States
1999	The Iron Giant	Animator
2002	The Powerpuff Girls Movie	Story, screenwriter, storyboard artist, character designer, character layout supervisor
2013	Bronies: The Extremely Unexpected Adult Fans of My Little Pony	Executive Producer, herself
2015	The Iron Giant: Signature Edition	Animator
2018	#TheLateBatsby	Short film; Director, writer, story, character design

=== Television ===
Year	Title	Role
1995	The Maxx	Character layout artist
2001	Codename: Kids Next Door	Walk cycles Episode: No P in the OOL
2001–2005	The Powerpuff Girls	Storyboard artist, Story, writer, director, Supervising director
2004–2009	Foster's Home for Imaginary Friends	Co-developer, Supervising producer (Seasons 3–4), writer, Story, Story supervisor, Storyboard artist, Character designer, Animation director, Story editor
2010–2011	My Little Pony: Friendship Is Magic	Creator, Developer; Season 1: Executive producer, writer, Character designer, Creative director, Story supervisor, Story editor Season 2: Executive producer on "The Return of Harmony", Consulting producer
2012	Super Best Friends Forever	Creator, director, writer, Storyboard artist, producer
2013–2014	Wander Over Yonder	Co-producer, Story editor, writer, director, Character designer (Season 1 only)
2019–2021	DC Super Hero Girls	Creator, Developer, writer, Executive Producer
2021–2022	Kid Cosmic	Co-developer, Producer (Season 2–3), Story, Writer ("Kid Cosmic and the Rings of Power!", Seasons 2–3)
TBA	Toil & Trouble	Creator, Developer, Character Designer

=== Video games ===
Year	Title	Role
2018/2020	Them's Fightin' Herds	Narrative design director (story), character designer (main characters)
