= Craig McCracken =

American animator (born 1971)

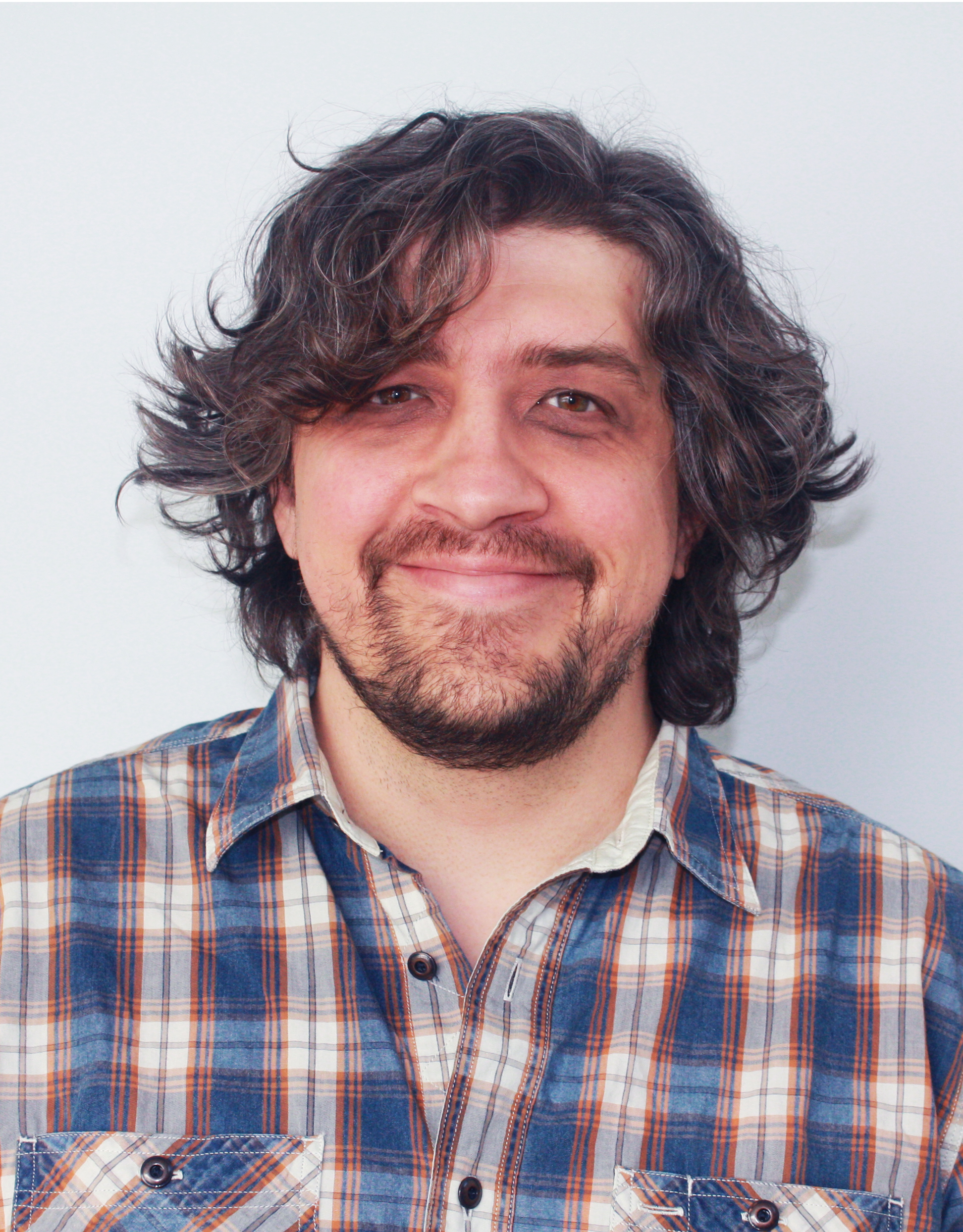
- McCracken in January 2012
- Born: March 31, 1971 (age 55); Charleroi, Pennsylvania, U.S.
- Occupation: Animator
- Years active: 1990–present
- Known for: The Powerpuff Girls; Foster's Home for Imaginary Friends; Wander Over Yonder; Kid Cosmic
- Spouse: Lauren Faust (m. 2004)
- Children: 1
- Website: www.deviantart.com/cmcc

Craig Winnett McCracken (born March 31, 1971) is an American animator, best known for creating Cartoon Network's The Powerpuff Girls and Foster's Home for Imaginary Friends, Disney's Wander Over Yonder, and Netflix's Kid Cosmic.

Regarded as "one of the most successful creators of episodic comedy cartoons", his style was "at the forefront of a second wave of innovative, creator-driven television animation" in the 1990s, along with that of other animators such as Genndy Tartakovsky, and has been credited as "a staple of American modern animated television".

== Early life and education ==
McCracken was born on March 31, 1971, in Charleroi, Pennsylvania, to Eva (née Pfile), a community college art instructor, and Norman "Herk" McCracken, a Minor League Baseball pitcher who died when McCracken was 7. They relocated to Southern California shortly after Norman's death. He began drawing at an early age. He attended California High School in Whittier, California and in 1990 enrolled at the California Institute of the Arts (CalArts), where he met his friend and future collaborator, Genndy Tartakovsky. During his first year, John Kricfalusi, the creator of The Ren & Stimpy Show, offered McCracken a job as a storyboard artist and animator during the show's first season. However, McCracken would turn down the offer as he wanted to focus on his degree.

McCracken would create a series of short cartoons featuring a character named No Neck Joe, which were picked up by Spike and Mike's Sick and Twisted Festival of Animation. While at CalArts, he also created a short entitled Whoopass Stew!, which would later become the basis for The Powerpuff Girls.

== Career ==
In 1993, McCracken was hired by Hanna-Barbera Cartoons as an art director on the Turner Broadcasting System series 2 Stupid Dogs, alongside Tartakovsky. As his first job in the animation industry, he was "never really happy with how that [show] worked". While McCracken was at Hanna-Barbera, studio president Fred Seibert began a new project: an animation incubator consisting of 48 new cartoons running approximately seven minutes each. Dubbed What a Cartoon!, it motivated McCracken to further develop his Whoopass Girls! creation. He recalled that the network could not market a show with the word "ass" in it, so two of his friends came up with The Powerpuff Girls as a replacement for the original title. His new pilot, "Meat Fuzzy Lumpkins", premiered during the Space Ghost Coast to Coast episode 1st World Premiere Toon-In on February 20, 1995. A second short, "Crime 101", followed on January 28, 1996. The first short to be picked up by the network was Tartakovsky's Dexter's Laboratory, which McCracken would contribute to in its early seasons. McCracken's Powerpuff Girls was the fourth cartoon to be greenlit a full series, which premiered on November 18, 1998, with the final episode airing on March 25, 2005. The show has won Emmy and Annie awards. In 2002, McCracken directed The Powerpuff Girls Movie, a prequel to his series. The film received generally positive reviews but was a box office failure.

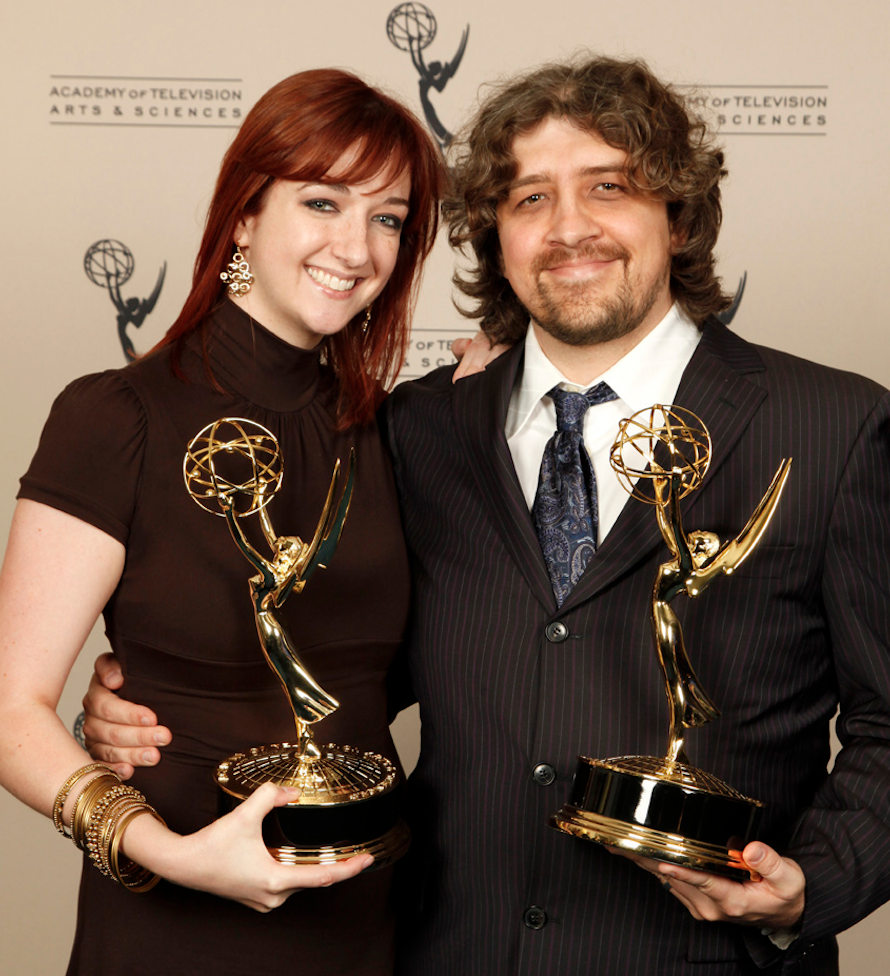
McCracken and his wife Lauren Faust at the Emmy Awards in 2008

McCracken left The Powerpuff Girls after four seasons, focusing on his next project, Foster's Home for Imaginary Friends. It premiered with the 90-minute television special "House of Bloo's" on August 13, 2004, on Cartoon Network. He developed the series with wife Lauren Faust and Mike Moon. The show ran for six seasons, all directed by McCracken, and concluded on May 3, 2009. It also won Emmy and Annie awards.

In April 2008, he became executive producer of a new Cartoon Network showcase project called The Cartoonstitute. After 17 years of employment, he resigned from Cartoon Network in 2009, after it shifted focus to live-action and reality shows. He created Wander Over Yonder for Disney Television Animation and Disney Channel in August 2013. After Wander Over Yonder was cancelled, McCracken pitched a new show to Disney, based on his 2009 comic strip The Kid from Planet Earth. Disney ultimately passed on the project, and he eventually left the company in 2017. He then pitched his idea to Netflix and it was greenlight under the name of Kid Cosmic. The show premiered on February 2, 2021, and ended on February 3, 2022. It is the first of McCracken's original works to have a serialized format and his return to the superhero genre since The Powerpuff Girls. He pitched 10 projects to Netflix in August 2021, but eventually left by April 2022 due to mass layoffs at Netflix Animation.

On July 18, 2022, it was announced that McCracken began developing reboots of The Powerpuff Girls and Foster's Home for Imaginary Friends at Hanna-Barbera Studios Europe. Foster's Home will take form in a pre-school show focused on new characters. In 2023, McCracken received the Winsor McCay Award at the Annie Awards ceremony for his "unparalleled achievement and exceptional contributions to animation". The Hollywood Reporter also named him one of the most powerful people in kids entertainment, alongside Lauren Faust. In February 2024, Deadline announced that the couple was developing a screenplay based on the children's picture book The Circus Ship for Trustbridge Entertainment.

== Style and influences ==
During his time at CalArts, McCracken discovered the cartoons of United Productions of America (UPA), which heavily influenced the visual style of his creations. Early in his career, he opted for a simplistic character design (as opposed to the realism of Warner Bros. or Disney feature films) because it is more practical for television production, where tight budgets and schedules limit what animators can achieve. He also noted that the crew at Hanna-Barbera wanted their shows "to be different than what was on Nick and Disney."

McCracken drew key inspiration from comic book artists like Charles M. Schulz, Bill Watterson, and Hergé. Each of his series have distinct influences in terms of design, comedy and storytelling. To mention some: 1960s Batman, Underdog and Jay Ward's Rocky and Bullwinkle in The Powerpuff Girls, Jim Henson's The Muppet Show and Sesame Street and Stephen Hillenburg's SpongeBob SquarePants in Foster's Home for Imaginary Friends (which also has a visual style inspired by 60s psychedelia), Yellow Submarine and Looney Tunes in Wander Over Yonder, and Dennis the Menace and The Adventures of Tintin in Kid Cosmic.

His shows often center around underdogs; for example, Kid Cosmic is about a group of "punk rock" characters who "may not have the skill or the talent, but they have the determination and conviction" to create a superhero team. Foster's also revolves around a group of misfit creatures who were abandoned by their original owners. Although the Powerpuff Girls are not typical underdogs, the fact that they are little girls might make people underestimate them as superheroes. He also liked to present "the contrast of cute characters being strong and tough". Although the Powerpuff Girls have been widely regarded as feminist icons, McCracken has claimed that the real background for their creation was finding "a fun idea" or "a cool concept."

== Personal life ==
McCracken married animator Lauren Faust on March 13, 2004. Faust took maternity leave in mid-2016 to take care of their newborn daughter, Quinn.

== Filmography ==
=== Short films ===
Year	Title	Director	Story	Writer	Producer	Creator	Storyboard artist	Animator	Other roles	Notes
1991	No Neck Joe	Yes	No	Yes	No	Yes	No	Yes		Animator (made in 1990, copyright date 1991)
1992	Whoopass Stew!	Yes	No	Yes	No	Yes	No	Yes		

=== Feature films ===
Year	Title	Director	Story	Writer	Producer	Creator	Storyboard artist	Animator	Other roles	Notes
1999	Dexter's Laboratory: Ego Trip	No	Yes	No	No	No	No	No		Television film
2002	The Powerpuff Girls Movie	Yes	Yes	Yes	Executive	Yes	Yes	Yes	Character designer and character layout	

=== Television ===
Year	Title	Director	Story	Writer	Producer	Creator	Storyboard artist	Other roles	Notes
1995–1997	What a Cartoon!	Yes	No	Yes	No	No	No	Art director	
1996–2003	Dexter's Laboratory	Yes	No	No	No	No	Yes	Art director and model designer	
1998–2005	The Powerpuff Girls	Yes	Yes	Yes	Executive	Yes	Yes	Recording director	Director (1998–2002;)
2004–2009	Foster's Home for Imaginary Friends	Yes	Yes	Yes	Executive	Yes	Yes	Developer, art director, character designer, and story editor	
2008	Uncle Grandpa	No	No	No	Executive	No	No		Executive producer (Episode: "Pilot")
2009	The Powerpuff Girls Rule!!!	Yes	Yes	Yes	Executive	Yes	Yes	Character designer and story editor	
2009	Chowder	No	Yes	No	No	No	Yes		Storyboard artist (Episode: "The Birthday Suits")
2009	Regular Show	No	No	No	Executive	No	No		Executive producer (Episode: "Pilot")
2013–2016	Wander Over Yonder	Yes	Yes	Yes	Executive	Yes	Yes	Character designer and additional voices	Storyboard artist (2013) and director (2013)
2021–2022	Kid Cosmic	Yes	Yes	Yes	Executive	Yes	Yes	Character designer	

Other roles

Year	Title	Role	Notes
1993–1995	2 Stupid Dogs	Art director	
1995	Space Ghost Coast to Coast	Himself (Episode: "1st Annual World Premiere Toon-In")	
1995–1996	Dumb and Dumber	Character designer	
2007	Diggs Tailwagger: Galactic Rover	Executive creative consultant	
2007	Enter Mode 5	Executive creative consultant	
2020	Ollie & Scoops	Opening Narrator	

== Awards and nominations ==
Date	Award	Category	Work	Shared with	Result	Ref
1996	Primetime Emmy Awards	Outstanding Animated Program (for Programming One Hour or Less)	Dexter's Laboratory (for "The Big Sister")	Larry Huber, Genndy Tartakovsky, and Paul Rudish	Nominated	
1997	Primetime Emmy Awards	Outstanding Animated Program (for Programming One Hour or Less)	Dexter's Laboratory (for "Star Spangled Sidekicks", "TV Super Pals", and "Game Over")	Sherry Gunther, Larry Huber, Genndy Tartakovsky, and Jason Butler Rote	Nominated	
1999	Primetime Emmy Awards	Outstanding Animated Program (For Programming One Hour or Less)	The Powerpuff Girls (for "Bubblevicious" and "The Bare Facts")	John McIntyre, Amy Keating Rogers, Jason Butler Rote, and Genndy Tartakovsky	Nominated	
2000	Primetime Emmy Awards	Outstanding Animated Program (For Programming One Hour or Less)	The Powerpuff Girls (for "Beat Your Greens" and "Down 'N Dirty")	Robert Alvarez, John McIntyre, Randy Myers, Amy Keating Rogers, and Genndy Tartakovsky	Nominated	
2001	Primetime Emmy Awards	Outstanding Animated Program (For Programming Less Than One Hour)	The Powerpuff Girls (for "Moral Decay" and "Meet the Beat Alls")	Robert Alvarez, Lauren Faust, John McIntyre, Amy Keating Rogers, and Genndy Tartakovsky	Nominated	
2004	Primetime Emmy Awards	Outstanding Animated Program (For Programming One Hour or More)	The Powerpuff Girls (for "'Twas the Fight Before Christmas")	Robert Alvarez, Lauren Faust, Juli Hashiguchi, Craig Lewis, John McIntyre, Brian A. Miller, Randy Myers, Amy Keating Rogers, Chris Savino, James Tim Walker	Nominated	
2005	Annie Awards	Best Production Design in an Animated Television Production	Foster's Home for Imaginary Friends (for "A Lost Claus")	Mike Moon, Dave Dunnet, and Martin Ansolabehere	Won	
2005	Annie Awards	Best Directing in an Animated Television Production	Foster's Home for Imaginary Friends (for "Duchess of Wails")	—N/a	Nominated	
2005	Primetime Emmy Awards	Outstanding Individual Achievement in Animation	Foster's Home for Imaginary Friends (for "House of Bloo's")	—N/a	Won	
2006	Annie Awards	Best Directing in an Animated Television Production	Foster's Home for Imaginary Friends (for "Bus the Two of Us")	—N/a	Nominated	
2006	Primetime Emmy Awards	Outstanding Animated Program (for Programming Less Than One Hour)	Foster's Home for Imaginary Friends (for "Go Goo Go")	Brian A. Miller, Lauren Faust, Jennifer Pelphrey, Vince Aniceto, Robert Alvarez, Eric Pringle	Nominated	
2007	Primetime Emmy Awards	Outstanding Animated Program (For Programming One Hour or More)	Foster's Home for Imaginary Friends (for "Good Wilt Hunting")	Brian A. Miller, Jennifer Pelphrey, Lauren Faust, Vince Aniceto, Michelle Papandrew, Darrick Bachman, Craig Lewis, Robert Alvarez, Eric Pringle, Robert Cullen	Nominated	
2008	Annie Awards	Directing in an Animated Television Production or Short Form	Foster's Home for Imaginary Friends (for Destination: Imagination)	Rob Renzetti	Nominated	
2009	Primetime Emmy Awards	Outstanding Animated Program (For Programming One Hour or More)	Foster's Home for Imaginary Friends (for Destination: Imagination)	Jennifer Pelphrey, Michelle Papandrew, Tim McKeon, Ed Baker, Alex Kirwan, Robert Alvarez, Brian A. Miller, Ryan Slater, Lauren Faust, Darrick Bachman, Vaughn Tada, Rob Renzetti, Eric Pringle	Won	
2010	Primetime Emmy Awards	Outstanding Short-Format Animated Program	Uncle Grandpa (for "Pilot")	Peter Browngardt, Janet Dimon, Robert Alvarez, Rob Renzetti, Brian A. Miller, Jennifer Pelphrey, and Rob Sorcher	Nominated	
2014	Annie Awards	Outstanding Achievement, Character Design in an Animated TV/Broadcast Production	Wander Over Yonder	—N/a	Nominated	
2015	Primetime Emmy Awards	Outstanding Short-Format Animated Program	Wander Over Yonder (for "The Gift 2: The Giftening")	Francisco Angones, Amy Higgins, Lauren Faust, Ben Joseph, Johanna Stein, Dave Thomas, Eddie Trigueros	Nominated	
2022	Annie Awards	Best Character Design - TV/Media	Kid Cosmic (for "Kid Cosmic and the Rings of Power!")	—N/a	Nominated	
2022	Annie Awards	Winsor McCay Award	—N/a	—N/a	Won	
2022	Children's and Family Emmy Awards	Individual Achievement in Animation	Kid Cosmic	—N/a	Won	
