= Rage of the Ape-Men =

- Primal episode
- Episode no.: Season 1 Episode 5
- Directed by: Bryan Andrews; Genndy Tartakovsky
- Written by: Bryan Andrews; Darrick Bachman; Genndy Tartakovsky
- Original air date: October 2, 2019
- Running time: 22 minutes

Guest appearances
- Jon Olson as Krog and Shaman

Episode chronology
← Previous "Terror Under the Blood Moon"	Next → "Scent of Prey"
- Primal season 1

"Rage of the Ape-Men" is the fifth episode of the American adult animated action-drama Primal, which aired on Adult Swim on October 12, 2019 as the mid-season finale of the series' first season. Directed by Bryan Andrews and Genndy Tartakovsky and co-written by the two with Darrick Bachman, the episode follows Spear (Aaron LaPlante) and Fang (Joel Valentine) as they are captured by a vicious tribe of ape men who hold a brutal tournament to the death, which they are made to partake in.

The first episode of the series to feature supernatural elements, it received critical acclaim, and was followed by "Scent of Prey", (Note: While chronologically followed by "Scent of Prey", the later-season episode "Plague of Madness" would be released first after "Rage of the Ape-Men" for April Fool's Day 2020 before reairing within sequence later in the year.) releasing to home media on June 1, 2021.

== Plot ==
Spear and Fang reach a seemingly peaceful oasis and relax before they are captured by a vicious tribe of ape-men that hold a brutal tournament to the death, with one of them eventually winning. After the gorilla-like gladiator Krog drinks an enhancement serum from the chimpanzee-like shaman, which mutates and enrages him, Fang is lowered into the arena for him to fight. Helplessly watching as Fang is beaten to near death, Spear breaks free from his bindings and drinks the rest of the serum, causing him to transform into a raging monster. After killing Krog, Spear proceeds to massacre the other ape-men overnight. When Spear eventually returns to normal, he runs to Fang's side as she lies motionless.

== Reception ==
"Rage of the Ape-Men" received a universally positive critical reception.
