= Bryan Andrews (filmmaker) =

American animator (born 1975)

- Born: Bryan D. Andrews; 1975 (age 50–51)
- Education: CalArts
- Occupations: Animator, storyboard artist, writer
- Years active: 1998–present
- Relatives: Mark Andrews (brother)

Bryan D. Andrews (born 1975) is an American animator, storyboard artist and writer known for his work in science fiction and superhero films. Born in 1975, Andrews began his film career with a credit in Warner Bros. Feature Animation's 1998 film Quest for Camelot. He contributed to Joseph: King of Dreams, Jackie Chan Adventures, Samurai Jack, My Life as a Teenage Robot, and various installments of the Marvel Cinematic Universe (MCU), such as Doctor Strange and Avengers: Endgame. Andrews also worked alongside Genndy Tartakovsky to produce the animated series Sym-Bionic Titan for Cartoon Network, which ran for 20 episodes.

Andrews was recognized at both the 2004 and 2005 Primetime Emmy Awards for his work on Star Wars: Clone Wars in the category of "Outstanding Animated Program (for Programming one Hour or More). “ He has since received two Primetime Emmys for his work on Samurai Jack, one Primetime Emmy nomination each for Samurai Jack and Escape from Cluster Prime, one Art Directors Guild award for Avengers: Endgame, and one nomination for Doctor Strange.

== Career ==
Bryan D. Andrews was born in 1975. His first film credit was for the 1998 Warner Bros. Feature Animation film Quest for Camelot, on which he worked as a layout assistant. After working on other projects such as Joseph: King of Dreams, Jackie Chan Adventures, and Samurai Jack, Andrews received his first Primetime Emmy Award win in 2004 for Outstanding Animated Program (for Programming One Hour or More) for his work on Star Wars: Clone Wars, an animated television short series created by Genndy Tartakovsky, who also worked with Andrews on Samurai Jack for Cartoon Network. Another Primetime Emmy Award the following year in the same category was given to Andrews alongside the series crew for their work on Clone Wars. Andrews would go on to be nominated twice, with one win, for the Primetime Emmys for his work on the Samurai Jack episode "The Four Seasons of Death". In 2006, Andrews received his second Primetime Emmy nomination as a writer for the My Life as a Teenage Robot special Escape from Cluster Prime.

Along with Genndy Tartakovsky and Paul Rudish, he co-created the animated television series Sym-Bionic Titan, which premiered on Cartoon Network on September 17, 2010. After 20 episodes, however, it was canceled due to lack of merchandise connected to the series, with the final episode airing April 9, 2011. He also worked with Tartakovsky as a storyboard artist on Iron Man 2, contributing to the climactic final action sequence.

== Personal life ==
Andrews has a Bachelor of Fine Arts degree from the California Institute of the Arts.

== Filmography ==
Year	Work	Role	Notes
1998	Quest for Camelot	Layout assistant	
2000	Joseph: King of Dreams	Additional storyboard artist	Direct-to-video film
2000–01	Jackie Chan Adventures	Storyboard artist; director	TV series; 6 episodes
2001	Constant Payne	Storyboard artist	TV short
2001–04, 2017	Samurai Jack	Storyboard artist; writer; story	TV series; 16 episodes
2003	Star Wars: Clone Wars	Writer	TV microseries
2003–09	My Life as a Teenage Robot	Writer, storyboard artist	TV series
2004	The Powerpuff Girls	Writer, storyboard artist	TV series
2005	Escape from Cluster Prime	Writer	TV movie
2005	Sky High	Storyboard artist	
2005	Clone Wars: Connecting the Dots	Himself	Video documentary short
2005	Genndy's Scrapbook	Himself	Video documentary short
2005	Clone Wars: Bridging the Saga	Himself	Video documentary short
2006	The Batman	Storyboard artist	TV series; 5 episodes
2006	Happy Tree Friends	Storyboard artist	TV series; 3 episodes
2010	Iron Man 2	Storyboard artist	
2010	Shrek Forever After	Additional story artist	
2010–11	Sym-Bionic Titan	Co-creator; storyboard artist; storyboard supervisor; writer	TV series; 16 episodes
2011	Priest	Storyboard artist: prologue animation	
2012	John Carter	Storyboard artist	
2012	The Avengers	Storyboard artist	
2012	Hotel Transylvania	Storyboard artist	
2013	Iron Man 3	Storyboard artist	
2013	Thor: The Dark World	Storyboard artist	
2014	Guardians of the Galaxy	Storyboard artist	
2015	Avengers: Age of Ultron	Storyboard artist	
2015	Ant-Man	Storyboard artist	
2016	Doctor Strange	Storyboard artist	
2017	Smurfs: The Lost Village	Story artist	
2017	Guardians of the Galaxy Vol. 2	Storyboard artist	
2018	Avengers: Infinity War	Storyboard artist	
2018	Skyscraper	Storyboard artist	
2019	Captain Marvel	Storyboard artist	
2019	Avengers: Endgame	Storyboard artist	
2019	Primal	Storyboard artist; writer; story	TV series
2021–24	What If...?	Director, executive producer, supervising director	TV series; 26 episodes
2022	Doctor Strange in the Multiverse of Madness	Special thanks	
2025–present	Marvel Zombies	Showrunner, director, executive producer	TV series; 4 episodes
2026	Avengers: Doomsday	Storyboard artist	

== Accolades ==
Year	Award	Category	Work	Shared with	Result
2004	Primetime Emmy Awards	Outstanding Animated Program (for Programming One Hour or More)	Star Wars: Clone Wars	Brian A. Miller, Claudia Katz, Genndy Tartakovsky, Geraldine Symon, Jennifer Pelphrey, Mark Andrews, Darrick Bachman, Paul Rudish, Scott Vanzo, Yumun Jeong, Robert Alvarez for Vol. 1	Won
2005	Primetime Emmy Awards	Outstanding Animated Program (for Programming One Hour or More)	Star Wars: Clone Wars	Claudia Katz, Brian A. Miller, Jennifer Pelphrey, Shareena Carlson, Geraldine Symon, Genndy Tartakovsky, Darrick Bachman, Paul Rudish, Yumun Jeong, Dong Soo Lee, Jong Ho Kim, Scott Vanzo, Robert Alvarez, Randy Myers for Vol. 2	Won
2005	Primetime Emmy Awards	Outstanding Animated Program (for Program (for Programming Less Than One Hour)	Samurai Jack	Genndy Tartakovsky, Brian A. Miller, Mark Andrews, Hueng-soon Park, Kwang-bae Park, Randy Myers, James T. Walker for "The Four Seasons of Death"	Nominated
2005	Primetime Emmy Awards	Outstanding Individual Achievement in Animation	Samurai Jack	for "The Four Seasons of Death"	Won
2006	Primetime Emmy Awards	Outstanding Animated Program (for Programming One Hour or More)	Escape from Cluster Prime	Rob Renzetti, Fred Seibert, Scott D. Peterson, Alex Kirwan, Brandon Kruse, Heather Martinez, Chris Reccardi, Chris Savino, Robert Alvarez	Nominated
2017	Primetime Emmy Awards	Outstanding Individual Achievement in Animation	Samurai Jack	for "XCIII"	Won
2017	Art Directors Guild	Excellence in Production Design Award	Doctor Strange	Charles Wood, Ray Chan, Julian Ashby, Thomas Brown, et al.	Nominated
2020	Art Directors Guild	Excellence in Production Design Award	Avengers: Endgame	Charles Wood, Ray Chan, Julian Ashby, Thomas Brown, et al.	Won
2021	Primetime Creative Arts Emmy Awards	Outstanding Animated Program	Primal	Genndy Tartakovsky, Brian A. Miller, Jennifer Pelphrey, Keith Crofford, Mike Lazzo, Oussama Bouacheria, Julien Chheng, Ulysse Malassagne, Erika Forzy, Shareena Carlson, Darrick Bachman, and David Krentz for "Plague of Madness"	Won
