= The Primal Theory =

- Primal episode
- Episode no.: Season 2 Episode 5
- Directed by: Genndy Tartakovsky
- Written by: Darrick Bachman; Genndy Tartakovsky
- Original air date: August 12, 2022
- Running time: 22 minutes

Guest appearances
- Aaron LaPlante as Constable; Jacob Dudman as Charles Darwin and Stevens; Fred Tatasciore as Giroud and Mad-man; Giles Matthey as Blakely; Jeremy Crutchley as C. D. Darlington

Episode chronology
← Previous "The Red Mist"	Next → "Vidarr"
- Primal season 2

"The Primal Theory" is the fifth episode of second season the American adult animated action-drama Primal, which aired on Adult Swim on August 12, 2022. Written by Darrick Bachman and Genndy Tartakovsky and directed by the latter, in a "detour" from the story of Spear and Fang, the episode pivots to follow Charles Darwin (Jacob Dudman) and C. D. Darlington (Jeremy Crutchley) as their discussion of evolution is interrupted by an escaped inmate (Fred Tatasciore). Aaron LaPlante, who voices Spear in the rest of the series, cameos as a police constable.

The first episode of the series not to feature Spear or Fang, it received critical acclaim, and was followed by "Vidarr", returning to the duo's storyline, releasing to home media on April 25, 2023. In September 2022, Tartakovsky initially revealed that Primal would become an anthology series from its third season onward, inspired by "The Primal Theory", however, in October 2025 the third season's reveal trailer would show that it would be a direct continuation of Spear's story, with Tartakovsky bringing Spear back as a zombie.

== Plot ==
In 1890 London, England, Charles (Jacob Dudman) unsuccessfully tries to defend his theory on evolution to his fellow scientists C. D. Darlington (Jeremy Crutchley), Blakely (Giles Matthey), Bertie (Crutchley), and Giroud (Fred Tatasciore). Their meeting is interrupted by a visiting constable (Aaron LaPlante) who is going around warning people about an inmate that escaped from the nearby asylum. Resuming their meeting, Charles surmises that, in the right situation, any person would regress back to their primitive roots to survive. Darlington dismisses as lunacy.

The evening is cut short when the escaped mad-man (Tatasciore) — who heavily resembles Spear in silhouette — breaks into the house, kills the butler Stevens (Dudman) and the cook Mrs. Kensington, and proceeds to prey on every person inside; including Giroud and Bertie.

As the night progresses, the three survivors take on weapons in Darlington's collection; such as guns, swords, and arrows. In the ensuing fight, Blakely is eventually knocked out by the inmate before Charles and Darlington gain the upper hand. They pursue the mad-man to the greenhouse, but he overpowers them and attempts to cannibalize Charles.

In a fit of primal rage, Darlington attacks and kills the mad-man with a massive bone and a spear; seemingly mimicking Spear with his own actions. Coming back to his senses, he looks at an injured and winded Charles, who is pleased with being vindicated on his "primal theory". Darlington is left horrified.

== Reception ==
"The Primal Theory" received a universally positive critical reception.

== Future ==
After the Primal second-season finale "Echoes of Eternity" aired on September 16, 2022, Genndy Tartakovsky confirmed that while Spear and Fang's story was officially concluded, he was formulating a third season for the series with a focus on new characters, intending for Primal to become an anthology series, inspired by "The Primal Theory".

However, in October 2025, the reveal trailer for Season 3 showed that instead of an anthology series, the series would continue focusing on Spear, who was resurrected as a zombie. Tartakovsky later explained, "I realized, 'What did I just do? I spent 20 episodes working so hard to introduce this relationship and these characters for the audience to like him, then I kill off the main character and then I end it. I think as a joke, I go, 'Oh, he'll be a zombie now.' And I was like, 'Wait, hold on a second.' And it felt really good in my gut and the instinct of it was right."
