= Darrick Bachman =

American television writer (born 1969)

Darrick Bachman is an American television writer born in Glendale, California. He has worked on such animated programs as Foster's Home for Imaginary Friends, Chowder, Sym-Bionic Titan, Mickey Mouse, the fifth season of Samurai Jack and Primal. He won two consecutive Primetime Emmy Awards in 2004 and 2005 for his work on Star Wars: Clone Wars and another win in 2009 for the Foster's Home for Imaginary Friends TV movie Destination: Imagination. He has been nominated for three additional Primetime Emmys, two Annie Awards, and one Daytime Emmy Award.

== Filmography ==
Year(s)	Work	Credit(s)	Notes
2002–17	Samurai Jack	Head writer; story; production assistant	TV series
2003–05	Star Wars: Clone Wars	Story	TV series
2005	Robotboy	Script	TV series
2006–09	Foster's Home for Imaginary Friends	Writer; story	TV series
2008	Destination: Imagination	Story	TV movie
2008	The Powerpuff Girls Rule!!!	Story	TV movie
2008–09	Chowder	Story	TV series
2010–11	Sym-Bionic Titan	Head writer; story; writer	TV series
2012	Regular Show	Writer	TV series
2012	Motorcity	Writer	TV series
2012–14	Fish Hooks	Story	TV series
2013	Randy Cunningham: 9th Grade Ninja	Writer	TV series
2014	Wander Over Yonder	Writer; story, 1 episode	TV series
2014–19	Mickey Mouse	Writer	TV series short
2016–17	Bunnicula	Story	TV series
2017	Be Cool, Scooby-Doo!	Writer, 1 episode	TV series
2019–present	Primal	Head writer and story	TV series
2020	The Wonderful World of Mickey Mouse	Writer and story	TV series short
2023	Unicorn: Warriors Eternal	Head writer and story	TV series
2024	The Day the Earth Blew Up: A Looney Tunes Movie	Writer	Theatrical film

== Accolades ==
Date	Award	Category	Work	Shared with	Result
2004	Primetime Emmy Awards	Outstanding Animated Program (For Programming One Hour or More)	Star Wars: Clone Wars (for Volume 1, Chapters 1–20)	Brian A. Miller, Claudia Katz, Genndy Tartakovsky, Geraldine Symon, Jennifer Pelphrey, Bryan Andrews, Mark Andrews, Paul Rudish, Scott Vanzo, Yumun Jeong, Robert Alvarez	Won
2005	Primetime Emmy Awards	Outstanding Animated Program (For Programming One Hour or More)	Star Wars: Clone Wars (for Volume 2, Chapters 21–25)	Claudia Katz, Brian A. Miller, Jennifer Pelphrey, Shareena Carlson, Geraldine Symon, Genndy Tartakovsky, Bryan Andrews, Paul Rudish, Yumun Jeong, Dong Soo Lee, Jong Ho Kim, Scott Vanzo, Robert Alvarez, Randy Myers	Won
2007	Primetime Emmy Awards	Outstanding Animated Program (For Programming One Hour or More)	Foster's Home for Imaginary Friends (for "Good Wilt Hunting")	Craig McCracken, Brian A. Miller, Jennifer Pelphrey, Lauren Faust, Vincent Aniceto, Michelle Papandrew, Craig Lewis, Robert Alvarez, Eric Pringle, Robert Cullen	Nominated
2007	Daytime Emmy Awards	Outstanding Broadband Program - Children's	Grim & Evil	Maxwell Atoms, Brian A. Miller, Jennifer Pelphrey, Kelsey Mann, Robert Alvarez, Nate Funaro, Sue Perrotto	Nominated
2009	Primetime Emmy Awards	Outstanding Animated Program (For Programming One Hour or More)	Foster's Home for Imaginary Friends: Destination Imagination	Craig McCracken, Brian A. Miller, Jennifer Pelphrey, Ryan Slater, Michelle Papandrew, Lauren Faust, Timothy McKeon, Ed Baker, Vaughn Tada, Alex Kirwan, Rob Renzetti, Robert Alvarez, Eric Pringle	Won
2015	Primetime Emmy Awards	Outstanding Short-Format Animated Program	Mickey Mouse (for "Mumbai Madness")	Paul Rudish, Alonso Ramirez Ramos, Graham MacDonald	Nominated
2015	Annie Awards	Outstanding Achievement in Writing in an Animated TV/Broadcast Production	Mickey Mouse	—N/a	Won
2017	Primetime Emmy Awards	Outstanding Short Form Animated Program	Mickey Mouse (for "Split Decisions")	Paul Rudish, Dave Wasson, Graham MacDonald	Nominated
2017	Primetime Emmy Awards	Outstanding Original Music and Lyrics	Mickey Mouse (for "Jing-A-Ling-A-Ling" from episode "Duck the Halls: A Mickey Mouse Christmas Special")	Christopher Willis and Paul Rudish	Nominated
2018	Annie Awards	Outstanding Achievement for Writing in an Animated Television/Broadcast Production	Mickey Mouse (for "Locked in Love")	—N/a	Nominated
2021	Primetime Creative Arts Emmy Awards	Outstanding Animated Program	Primal (for "Plague of Madness")	Genndy Tartakovsky, Brian A. Miller, Jennifer Pelphrey, Keith Crofford, Mike Lazzo, Oussama Bouacheria, Julien Chheng, Ulysse Malassagne, Erika Forzy, Shareena Carlson, David Krentz, and Bryan Andrews	Won
