= Plague of Madness =

- Primal episode
- Episode no.: Season 1 Episode 7
- Directed by: Genndy Tartakovsky
- Written by: David Krentz
- Original air date: April 1, 2020 (April Fool's): October 11, 2020
- Running time: 22 minutes

Episode chronology
- Primal season 1

"Plague of Madness" is the seventh episode of the first season of the American animated action-drama series Primal. It premiered unannounced on Adult Swim on April 1, 2020, as part of Adult Swim's annual April Fools' Day stunt, in a joking reference to the COVID-19 pandemic, after the fifth episode "Rage of the Ape Men", before formerly airing in its chronological place in the series (between "Scent of Prey" and "Coven of the Damned") on October 11, 2020. It was directed by Genndy Tartakovsky, and written by David Krentz from a story by Tartakovsky, Krentz, Darrick Bachman, and Bryan Andrews. In the episode, Spear and Fang flee in terror from a zombified Argentinosaurus.

The episode received critical acclaim, winning both an Annie Award and two Emmy Awards. It was released to home media on June 1, 2021.

== Plot ==
In a tranquil valley, a herd of blue Argentinosaurus are living their lives when one of their number encounters an insane zombified Parasaurolophus. The Argentinosaurus initially pays it no mind until the Parasaurolophus bites it, prompting the Argentinosaurus to fling it against a tree, killing it. The Argentinosaurus is left infected by the bite and sometime afterward, it begins exhibiting rabid symptoms, crying from pain as its skin decays and turns green, it becomes incredibly thirsty, and it begins vomiting blood. Eventually, the Argentinosaurus becomes a zombie itself, going on a rampage and brutally massacring the entire herd and stomping over their eggs before seemingly passing out.

Soon afterwards, Spear and Fang - having recovered from their encounters with the ape-men and wild dogs - stumble across the aftermath of the slaughter, disturbed by the many corpses and how they are untouched by scavengers or flies; a curious Fang sniffs one body before recoiling in terror. As they come to the middle of the roost, the infected Argentinosaurus rises up behind the duo. Realizing they cannot physically defeat the gargantuan, contaminated sauropod, the two run for their lives through the jungle as the Argentinosaurus pursues them. Eventually they hop into a ravine and jump into a cliffside cave. Following them down, the Argentinosaurus slides to the bottom of the ravine and knocks itself out. Exhausted and horrified, Spear and Fang rest in the cave.

That night, Spear has a nightmare of the Argentinosaurus biting and infecting him and Fang, the latter making him realize how much he has come to care for Fang. When the duo awaken in the middle of the night, they find the Argentinosaurus still knocked out. Spear convinces a hesitant Fang to quietly leave while the Argentinosaurus is unconscious. They manage to sneak past its body, but just as they do, the Argentinosaurus awakens and continues its pursuit of them through the ravine. Though the Argentinosaurus nearly catches up to them, the duo manage to escape through a crevasse that is too narrow for the sauropod, whose torso gets stuck in it.

Momentarily safe again, Spear and Fang begin to make their way across a volcanic plain, but quickly find the ground too fragile and decide to walk back the way they came to navigate around it. Before they can, however, the Argentinosaurus - its innards now completely decomposed, leaving it hollow - manages to force its way through the crevasse and pursues them again. After being burned by a lava geyser, the Argentinosaurus jumps towards them, breaking through the crust into the lava below, and allowing Spear and Fang to ride a wave to safer ground and resume running. The Argentinosaurus repeatedly re-emerges and sinks, unable to climb out but still pursuing them. Spear and Fang get to the other end of the plain, but the Argentinosaurus eventually catches fire from the lava, eventually melting and slowly incinerating to ash. As Spear and Fang observe its final agonizing moments in a mix of horror and pity, Spear catches one of the sauropod's flaming skin fragments, which cools down and turns blue in his hand.

== Reception ==
=== Critical reception ===
"Plague of Madness received a universally positive critical reception.

=== Accolades ===
Accolades received by Primal
Award	Year	Category	Recipient(s)	Result	Ref.
Annie Awards	2021	Outstanding Achievement for Directing in an Animated Television/Broadcast Production	Genndy Tartakovsky (for "Plague of Madness")	Won	
Primetime Creative Arts Emmy Awards	2021	Outstanding Animated Program	Genndy Tartakovsky, Brian A. Miller, Jennifer Pelphrey, Keith Crofford, Mike Lazzo, Oussama Bouacheria, Julien Chheng, Ulysse Malassagne, Erika Forzy, Shareena Carlson, Darrick Bachman, David Krentz, and Bryan Andrews (for "Plague of Madness")	Won	
Primetime Creative Arts Emmy Awards	2021	Outstanding Individual Achievement in Animation	David Krentz (storyboard artist; for "Plague of Madness")	Won	
