= Brian A. Miller =

American television producer

- Born: Brooklyn, New York, U.S.
- Education: California State University, Northridge (B.A.)
- Occupation: Television producer
- Years active: 1986–present
- Title: CEO/Secretary of Pat and Mike Productions, Inc. (2021–present)
- Children: 3

Brian A. Miller is an American television producer and former executive at Cartoon Network Studios, Nickelodeon Animation Studio, Hanna-Barbera, and DIC Entertainment.

== Career ==
Miller was the former Senior Vice President and General Manager of Cartoon Network Studios in Burbank, California, having assumed the title from 2000 to 2021. He was formerly Vice President of Production at Nickelodeon Animation Studio, Vice President of Production at Hanna-Barbera, and Vice President of Production at DIC Entertainment. He served as a production supervisor for 1983's Alvin and the Chipmunks series and was the executive in charge of production for various shows in the 1990s and early 2000s such as Dexter's Laboratory, Hey Arnold!, The Angry Beavers, ChalkZone, CatDog, Sonic the Hedgehog, The Powerpuff Girls, Captain Planet and the Planeteers, Adventures of Sonic the Hedgehog, The Adventures of Super Mario Bros. 3, Super Mario World, Cow and Chicken, Johnny Bravo, and the first and early second season of SpongeBob SquarePants.

He has overseen the production of many animated series, such as Adventure Time, Chowder, Foster's Home for Imaginary Friends, Regular Show, Dexter's Laboratory, Samurai Jack, Mixels, and Ben 10. He has received 11 Emmy Awards out of 40 nominations.

On January 8, 2021, Miller founded a new animation production studio, Pat and Mike Productions, Inc. Miller serves as both chief executive officer and secretary, while former Cartoon Network Studios partner Jennifer Pelphrey serves as chief operating officer.

On March 19, 2021, Miller left his job at Cartoon Network Studios, as part of a company wide restructuring due to the merger with AT&T.

== Personal life ==
Miller attended California State University in Northridge, Los Angeles, from 1978 to 1982. He has a Bachelor of Arts degree in radio, television, and film.

== Accolades ==
Date	Award	Category	Work	Shared with	Result
2002	Primetime Emmy Awards	Outstanding Animated Program (For Programming One Hour or More)	Samurai Jack (for "The Premiere Movie")	Yumun Jeong, Yeol Jung Chang, Bong Koh Jae, Paul Rudish, Genndy Tartakovsky	Nominated
2004	Primetime Emmy Awards	Outstanding Animated Program (For Programming One Hour or More)	The Powerpuff Girls: 'Twas the Fight Before Christmas	Craig McCracken, Chris Savino, Lauren Faust, Craig Lewis, Amy Keating Rogers, Robert Alvarez, John McIntyre, Randy Myers, James T. Walker, Juli Murphy	Nominated
2004	Primetime Emmy Awards	Outstanding Animated Program (For Programming One Hour or More)	Star Wars: Clone Wars (for Volume 1, Chapters 1–20)	Claudia Katz, Genndy Tartakovsky, Geraldine Symon, Jennifer Pelphrey, Bryan Andrews, Mark Andrews, Darrick Bachman, Paul Rudish, Scott Vanzo, Yumun Jeong, Robert Alvarez	Won
2004	Primetime Emmy Awards	Outstanding Animated Program (For Programming Less Than One Hour)	Samurai Jack (for "Birth of Evil")	Genndy Tartakovsky, Don Shank, Robert Alvarez, Randy Myers, Yumun Jeong, Bong Koh Jae, James T. Walker	Won
2005	Primetime Emmy Awards	Outstanding Animated Program (For Programming Less Than One Hour)	Samurai Jack (for "The Four Seasons of Death")	Genndy Tartakovsky, Bryan Andrews, Mark Andrews, Hueng-soon Park, Kwang-bae Park, Randy Myers, James T. Walker	Nominated
2005	Primetime Emmy Awards	Outstanding Animated Program (For Programming One Hour or More)	Star Wars: Clone Wars (for Volume 2, Chapters 21–25)	Claudia Katz, Jennifer Pelphrey, Shareena Carlson, Geraldine Symon, Genndy Tartakovsky, Bryan Andrews, Darrick Bachman, Paul Rudish, Yumun Jeong, Dong Soo Lee, Jong Ho Kim, Scott Vanzo, Robert Alvarez, Randy Myers	Won
2006	Primetime Emmy Awards	Outstanding Animated Program (For Programming Less Than One Hour)	Foster's Home for Imaginary Friends (for "Go Goo Go")	Craig McCracken, Lauren Faust, Jennifer Pelphrey, Vincent Aniceto, Robert Alvarez, Eric Pringle	Nominated
2006	Primetime Emmy Awards	Outstanding Animated Program (For Programming Less Than One Hour)	Camp Lazlo (for "Hello Dolly/Over Cooked Beans")	Joe Murray, Mark O'Hare, Jennifer Pelphrey, Shareena Carlson, Merriwether Williams, Steve Little, Kaz, Mike Roth, Kent Osborne, Clay Morrow, Cosmo Segurson, Brian Sheesley, Lindsey Pollard, Jong Ho Kim, Dong-kun Won, Phil Cummings, Maureen Mlynarczyk	Nominated
2007	Primetime Emmy Awards	Outstanding Animated Program (For Programming One Hour or More)	Foster's Home for Imaginary Friends (for "Good Wilt Hunting")	Craig McCracken, Jennifer Pelphrey, Lauren Faust, Vincent Aniceto, Michelle Papandrew, Darrick Bachman, Craig Lewis, Robert Alvarez, Eric Pringle, Robert Cullen	Nominated
2007	Primetime Emmy Awards	Outstanding Animated Program (For Programming One Hour or More)	Camp Lazlo: Where's Lazlo?	Joe Murray, Mark O'Hare, Jennifer Pelphrey, Janet Dimon, Brian Sheesley, Dong-kun Won, Merriwether Williams, Russell Calabrese, Phil Cummings, Lindsey Pollard, Swinton O. Scott III	Won
2007	Daytime Emmy Awards	Outstanding Broadband Program - Children's	Grim & Evil	Maxwell Atoms, Jennifer Pelphrey, Kelsey Mann, Robert Alvarez, Nate Funaro, Darrick Bachman, Sue Perrotto	Nominated
2008	Daytime Emmy Awards	Outstanding Special Class Animated Program	Ben 10	Sam Register, Jennifer Pelphrey, Alex Soto, Donna Smith, Tramm Wigzell	Nominated
2008	Primetime Emmy Awards	Outstanding Special Class - Short-Format Animated Programs	Chowder (for "Burple Nurples")	Joe Murray, Mark O'Hare, Jennifer Pelphrey, Janet Dimon, Brian Sheesley, Dong-kun Won, Merriwether Williams, Russell Calabrese, Phil Cummings, Lindsey Pollard, Swinton O. Scott III	Nominated
2008	Primetime Emmy Awards	Outstanding Special Class - Short-Format Animated Programs	Camp Lazlo (for "Lazlo's First Crush")	Joe Murray, Mark O'Hare, Jennifer Pelphrey, Janet Dimon, Brian Sheesley, Dong-kun Won, John Davis Infantino, Piero Piluso, Merriwether Williams, Kaz, Steve Little, Doug Gallery	Won
2009	Daytime Emmy Awards	Outstanding Special Class Animated Program	Ben 10: Alien Force	Sam Register, Glen Murakami, Jennifer Pelphrey, Donna Smith	Nominated
2009	Primetime Emmy Awards	Outstanding Animated Program (For Programming One Hour or More)	Destination: Imagination	Craig McCracken, Jennifer Pelphrey, Ryan Slater, Michelle Papandrew, Lauren Faust, Timothy McKeon, Darrick Bachman, Ed Baker, Vaughn Tada, Alex Kirwan, Rob Renzetti, Robert Alvarez, Eric Pringle	Won
2010	Primetime Emmy Awards	Outstanding Short Form Animated Program	Uncle Grandpa (for "Pilot")	Jennifer Pelphrey, Rob Sorcher, Craig McCracken, Peter Browngardt, Rob Renzetti, Janet Dimon, Robert Alvarez	Nominated
2010	Primetime Emmy Awards	Outstanding Short Form Animated Program	Chowder (for "The Toots")	C. H. Greenblatt, Jennifer Pelphrey, Louis J. Cuck, Kevin Kramer, William Reiss, Ian Wasseluk, Eddy Houchins	Nominated
2010	Primetime Emmy Awards	Outstanding Short Form Animated Program	Adventure Time (for "My Two Favorite People")	Derek Drymon, Rob Swartz, Rob Sorcher, Fred Seibert, Jennifer Pelphrey, Curtis Lelash, Kevin Kolde, Kelly Crews, Timothy McKeon, Merriwether Williams, Kent Osborne, Pendleton Ward, Larry Leichliter, Dong-kun Won	Nominated
2010	Primetime Emmy Awards	Outstanding Short Form Animated Program	The Marvelous Misadventures of Flapjack (for "Tee Hee Tummy Turns")	Thurop Van Orman, Jennifer Pelphrey, Pernelle Hayes, Kent Osborne, Patrick McHale, Somvilay Xayaphone, John McIntyre, Larry Leichliter	Nominated
2011	Primetime Emmy Awards	Outstanding Short Form Animated Program	Adventure Time (for "It Came from the Nightosphere)	Jennifer Pelphrey, Curtis Lelash, Rob Swartz, Rob Sorcher, Fred Seibert, Thurop Van Orman, Kevin Kolde, Kelly Crews, Pendleton Ward, Patrick McHale, Merriwether Williams, Steve Little, Adam Muto, Rebecca Sugar, Larry Leichliter, Dong-kun Won	Nominated
2011	Primetime Emmy Awards	Outstanding Short Form Animated Program	Regular Show (for "Mordecai and the Rigbys")	Jennifer Pelphrey, Curtis Lelash, Rob Swartz, Rob Sorcher, J. G. Quintel, Chris Reccardi, Janet Dimon, Sean Szeles, Shion Takeuchi, Matt Price, Mike Roth, Brian Sheesley, Robert Alvarez, Gi-ho Hwang	Nominated
2012	Primetime Emmy Awards	Outstanding Short Form Animated Program	Adventure Time (for "Too Young")	Jennifer Pelphrey, Curis Lelash, Rob Sorcher, Pendleton Ward, Fred Seibert, Kevin Kolde, Kelly Crews, Tom Herpich, Jesse Moynihan, Mark Banker, Patrick McHale, Kent Osborne, Larry Leichliter, Dong-kun Won, Don Judge, Michel Lyman	Nominated
2012	Primetime Emmy Awards	Outstanding Short Form Animated Program	Regular Show (for "Eggscellent")	Jennifer Pelphrey, Curtis Lelash, Rob Sorcher, J. G. Quintel, Mike Roth, Janet Dimon, Matt Price, Jack C. Thomas, John Davis Infantino, Robert Alvarez	Won
2013	Primetime Emmy Awards	Outstanding Short Form Animated Program	Adventure Time (for "Simon & Marcy")	Pendleton Ward, Fred Seibert, Jennifer Pelphrey, Curtis Lelash, Rob Sorcher, Adam Muto, Kevin Kolde, Kelly Crews, Cole Sanchez, Rebecca Sugar, Patrick McHale, Kent Osborne, Don Judge, Richard Collado, Michel Lyman, Bong Hee Han	Nominated
2013	Primetime Emmy Awards	Outstanding Short Form Animated Program	Regular Show (for "A Bunch Full of Grown Geese")	J. G. Quintel, Jennifer Pelphrey, Curtis Lelash, Rob Sorcher, Mike Roth, Ryan Slater, Calvin Wong, Toby Jones, Matt Price, Michele Cavin, John Davis Infantino, Robert Alvarez, Jong-Cheol Baek	Nominated
2013	Primetime Emmy Awards	Outstanding Short Form Animated Program	Clarence	Jennifer Pelphrey, Curtis Lelash, Rob Sorcher, Peter Browngardt, Nate Funaro, Skyler Page, Robert Alvarez	Nominated
2013	Primetime Emmy Awards	Outstanding Animated Program	Regular Show (for "The Christmas Special")	J. G. Quintel, Jennifer Pelphrey, Curtis Lelash, Rob Sorcher, Mike Roth, Ryan Slater, Sean Szeles, Kat Morris, Benton Connor, Hilary Florido, Matt Price, Michele Cavin, John Davis Infantino, Robert Alvarez, Gi-ho Hwang, Yu-Seong Kim	Nominated
2014	Primetime Emmy Awards	Outstanding Short Form Animated Program	Regular Show (for "The Last Laserdisc Player")	J. G. Quintel, Jennifer Pelphrey, Curtis Lelash, Rob Sorcher, Mike Roth, Ryan Slater, Calvin Wong, Toby Jones, Matt Price, Michele Cavin, John Davis Infantino, Sean Szeles, Robert Alvarez, Gi-ho Hwang	Nominated
2014	Primetime Emmy Awards	Outstanding Short Form Animated Program	Adventure Time (for "Be More")	Pendleton Ward, Fred Seibert, Jennifer Pelphrey, Curtis Lelash, Rob Sorcher, Adam Muto, Nick Jennings, Kevin Kolde, Kelly Crews, Tom Herpich, Steve Wolfhard, Kent Osborne, Patrick McHale, Nate Cash, Don Judge, Phil Cummings, Michael Lyman, Helen Roh, Bong Hee Han	Nominated
2015	Primetime Emmy Awards	Outstanding Short Form Animated Program	Regular Show (for "White Elephant Gift Exchange")	J. G. Quintel, Rob Sorcher, Curtis Lelash, Jennifer Pelphrey, Mike Roth, Ryan Slater, Benton Connor, Madeline Queripel, Matt Price, Michele Cavin, John Davis Infantino, Sean Szeles, Robert Alvarez, Gi-ho Hwang	Nominated
2015	Primetime Emmy Awards	Outstanding Short Form Animated Program	Steven Universe (for "Lion 3: Straight to Video")	Rebecca Sugar, Rob Sorcher, Curtis Lelash, Jennifer Pelphrey, Jackie Buscarino, Joseph D. Johnston, Jeff Liu, Matt Burnett, Ben Levin, Kat Moris, Ian Jones-Quartey, Ki-Yong Bae, Sue Hong Kim, Nick DeMayo	Nominated
2015	Primetime Emmy Awards	Outstanding Short Form Animated Program	Adventure Time (for "Jake the Brick")	Pendleton Ward, Rob Sorcher, Curtis Lelash, Jennifer Pelphrey, Fred Seibert, Adam Muto, Nick Jennings, Kevin Kolde, Kelly Crews, Jack Pendarvis, Kent Osborne, Dong-kun Won, Don Judge, Michel Lyman, Phil Cummings, Jung Yon Kwon, Helen Roh, Barbara Dourmaskin-Case	Won
2015	Primetime Emmy Awards	Outstanding Animated Program	Over the Garden Wall	Patrick McHale, Rob Sorcher, Curtis Lelash, Jennifer Pelphrey, Pernelle Hayes, Amalia Levari, Tom Herpich, Bert Youn, Robert Alvarez, Larry Leichliter, Eddy Houchins, Ken Bruce	Won
2016	Primetime Emmy Awards	Outstanding Short Form Animated Program	Steven Universe (for "The Answer")	Rebecca Sugar, Rob Sorcher, Jennifer Pelphrey, Curtis Lelash, Ian Jones-Quartey, Jackie Buscarino, Lamar Abrams, Katie Mitroff, Matt Burnett, Ben Levin, Kat Morris, Byung-Ki Lee, Nick DeMayo, Joseph D. Johnston	Nominated
2016	Primetime Emmy Awards	Outstanding Short Form Animated Program	The Powerpuff Girls (for "Once Upon a Townsville")	Nick Jennings, Rob Sorcher, Jennifer Pelphrey, Curtis Lelash, Bob Boyle, Pernelle Hayes, Haley Mancini, Kyle Neswald, Benjamin P. Carow, Jake Goldman, Julia Fitzmaurice, Robert Alvarez, Richard Collado	Nominated
2016	Primetime Emmy Awards	Outstanding Short Form Animated Program	Adventure Time (for "The Hall of Egress")	Pendleton Ward, Fred Seibert, Rob Sorcher, Jennifer Pelphrey, Curtis Lelash, Adam Muto, Kevin Kolde, Kelly Crews, Tom Herpich, Kent Osborne, Jack Pendarvis, Ashly Burch, Andres Salaff, Don Judge, Michel Lyman, Phil Cummings	Nominated
2017	Primetime Emmy Awards	Outstanding Short Form Animated Program	Steven Universe (for "Mr. Greg")	Rebecca Sugar, Rob Sorcher, Curtis Lelash, Jennifer Pelphrey, Jackie Buscarino, Jeff Liu, Ben Levin, Matt Burnett, Ian Jones-Quartey, Kat Morris, Joseph D. Johnston, Nick DeMayo, Ki-Yong Bae, Jin-hee Park, Kimson Albert, Doug Gallery, Maureen Mlynarczyk	Nominated
2017	Primetime Emmy Awards	Outstanding Short Form Animated Program	Adventure Time (for "Islands Part 4: Imaginary Resources")	Pendleton Ward, Fred Seibert, Adam Muto, Rob Sorcher, Jennifer Pelphrey, Curtis Lelash, Kelly Crews, Graham Falk, Kent Osborne, Jack Pendarvis, Ashly Burch, Elizabeth Ito, Lindsey Pollard, Chul Hee Han, Michel Lyman, Ken Bruce, Maureen Mlynarczyk	Nominated
2018	Primetime Emmy Awards	Outstanding Short Form Animated Program	We Bare Bears (for "Hurricane Hal")	Daniel Chong, Rob Sorcher, Jennifer Pelphrey, Curtis Lelash, Carrie Wilksen, Randy Myers, Sang Yup Lee, Louie Zong, Mikey Heller, Manny Hernandez, Robert Alvarez, Kevin Petrilak, Sae Chang Kwak	Nominated
2018	Primetime Emmy Awards	Outstanding Short Form Animated Program	Steven Universe (for "Jungle Moon")	Rebecca Sugar, Rob Sorcher, Jennifer Pelphrey, Curtis Lelash, Jackie Buscarino, Jeff Liu, Miki Brewster, Matt Burnett, Ben Levin, Kat Morris, Joseph D. Johnston, Nick DeMayo, Ki-Yong Bae, Sue Hong Kim, Kimson Albert, Maureen Mlynarczyk	Nominated
2018	Primetime Emmy Awards	Outstanding Short Form Animated Program	Adventure Time (for "Ring of Fire")	Pendleton Ward, Fred Seibert, Adam Muto, Rob Sorcher, Jennifer Pelphrey, Curtis Lelash, Kelly Crews, Tom Herpich, Steve Wolfhard, Kent Osborne, Jack Pendarvis, Julia Pott, Ashly Burch, Cole Sanchez, Lindsey Pollard, Dong-kun Won, Maureen Mlynarczyk, Robert Alvarez, Michel Lyman	Nominated
2019	Primetime Emmy Awards	Outstanding Short Form Animated Program	Steven Universe (for "Reunited")	Rebecca Sugar, Rob Sorcher, Jennifer Pelphrey, Curtis Lelash, Jackie Buscarino, Paul Villeco, Katie Mitroff, Jeff Liu, Miki Brewster, Matt Burnett, Ben Levin, Kat Morris, Tom Herpich, Joseph D. Johnston, Nick DeMayo, Kimson Albert, Maureen Mlynarczyk	Nominated
2019	Primetime Emmy Awards	Outstanding Animated Program	Adventure Time (for "Come Along with Me")	Lindsey Pollard, Diana Lafyatis, Cole Sanchez, Julia Pott, Jack Pendarvis, Kent Osborne, Graham Falk, Hanna K. Nyström, Aleks Sennwald, Seo Jung Kim, Somvilay Xayaphone, Steve Wolfhard, Tom Herpich, Keith Mack, Kelly Crews, Conrad Montgomery, Jennifer Pelphrey, Rob Sorcher, Adam Muto, Pendleton Ward	Nominated
2020	Primetime Emmy Awards	Outstanding Short Form Animated Program	Steven Universe (for "Steven Universe: Fragments")	Jennifer Pelphrey, Rob Sorcher, Tramm Wigzell, Rebecca Sugar, Kat Morris, Alonso Ramirez Ramos, Jackie Buscarino, Lamar Abrams, Miki Brewster, Jack Pendarvis, Kate Tsang, Joseph D. Johnston, Hilary Florido, Nick DeMayo, Maureen Mlynarczyk, Sarah Gencarelli	Nominated
2021	Primetime Emmy Awards	Outstanding Animated Program	Primal (for "Plague of Madness")	Genndy Tartakovsky, Jennifer Pelphrey, Keith Crofford, Mike Lazzo, Oussama Bouacheria, Julien Chheng, Ulysse Malassagne, Shareena Carlson, Darrick Bachman, David Krentz and Bryan Andrews	Won

== Filmography ==
Year	Title	Role
1986	M.A.S.K.	Associate producer
1987	Beverly Hills Teens	Associate producer
1987	The New Archies	Associate producer
1987	Lady Lovelylocks and the Pixietails	Associate producer
1989	Camp Candy	Associate producer
1989	Alvin & the Chipmunks	Associate producer
1989	G.I. Joe: Operation Dragonfire	Associate producer
1990–1991	Bobby's World	Executive producer
1993	Alvin's Christmas Carol	Associate producer
1996–2002	What a Cartoon!	Supervising producer
2000	Foe Paws	
2000–2001	Cartoon Cartoon Fridays	Supervising producer
2000–2004	The Powerpuff Girls	Supervising producer
2000–2004	Johnny Bravo	Supervising producer
2001	Imp, Inc.	Supervising producer
2001	No P in the Ool	Supervising producer
2001	My Freaky Family: Welcome to My World	Supervising producer
2001	A Kitty Bobo Show	Supervising producer
2001	Samurai Jack: The Premiere Movie	Supervising producer
2001	The Flintstones: On the Rocks	Supervising producer
2001	CatDog: The Great Parent Mystery	Executive producer
2001	Ferret and Parrot	Supervising producer
2001–2003	Time Squad	Supervising producer
2001–2004; 2017	Samurai Jack	Supervising producer (2001–2004); executive producer (2017)
2002	Welcome to Eltingville	Supervising producer
2002	The Powerpuff Girls Movie	Executive producer
2002	Dexter's Laboratory: Chicken Scratch	Executive producer
2002	Bagboy!	Supervising producer
2002	The Groovenians	Supervising producer
2002–2003	Larryboy: The Cartoon Adventures	Executive producer
2002–2003	Dexter's Laboratory	Supervising producer
2002–2003	Harvey Birdman, Attorney at Law	Supervising producer
2002–2003	Whatever Happened to... Robot Jones?	Supervising producer
2002–2007	Codename: Kids Next Door	Supervising producer
2003	The Powerpuff Girls: 'Twas the Fight Before Christmas	Supervising producer
2003–2005	Star Wars: Clone Wars	Executive producer
2003–2007	The Grim Adventures of Billy & Mandy	Executive producer, supervising producer
2004	Party Wagon	Supervising producer
2004	Invader Zim	Executive producer
2004	Megas XLR	Supervising producer
2004	Evil Con Carne	Supervising producer
2004	Hi Hi Puffy AmiYumi	Executive producer
2004–2009	Foster's Home for Imaginary Friends	Executive producer
2005	Ed, Edd n Eddy	Executive producer
2005–2006	Robotboy	Executive producer
2005–2007	The Life and Times of Juniper Lee	Executive producer
2005–2008	My Gym Partner's a Monkey	Executive producer
2006	Korgoth of Barbaria	Executive producer
2006	Codename: Kids Next Door - Operation Z.E.R.O.	Supervising producer
2006	Welcome to Wackamo	Executive producer
2006–2007	Ben 10	Executive producer
2006–2007	Squirrel Boy	Executive producer
2007	Billy & Mandy's Big Boogey Adventure	Executive producer
2007	What's Wrong with Ruth?	Executive producer
2007	Camp Lazlo Shorts	Executive producer
2007	Ben 10: Secret of the Omnitrix	Executive producer
2007	The Grim Adventures of the KND	Supervising producer
2007	Transformers: Animated	Executive producer
2007	Out of Jimmy's Head	Executive producer
2007	Class of 3000	Executive producer
2007–2010	Chowder	Executive producer
2008	Underfist: Halloween Bash	Executive producer
2008	Foster's Home for Imaginary Friends: Destination Imagination	Executive producer
2008	The Powerpuff Girls Rule!!!	Executive producer
2008–2010	Ben 10: Alien Force	Executive producer
2008–2010	The Marvelous Misadventures of Flapjack	Executive producer
2009	Ed, Edd n Eddy's Big Picture Show	Executive producer
2009–2017	Regular Show	Executive producer
2010	Tower Prep	Executive producer
2010	Firebreather	Executive producer
2010–2011	Robotomy	Executive producer
2010–2011	Sym-Bionic Titan	Executive producer
2010–2012	Ben 10: Ultimate Alien	Executive producer
2010–2013	Generator Rex	Executive producer
2010–2017	Uncle Grandpa	Executive producer
2010–2018	Adventure Time	Executive producer
2011	Secret Mountain Fort Awesome	Executive producer
2011	Level Up	Executive producer
2012	Incredible Crew	Executive producer
2012–2013	Level Up	Executive producer
2012–2014	Ben 10: Omniverse	Executive producer
2013	Paranormal Roommates	Executive producer
2013	Lakewood Plaza Turbo	Executive producer
2013	Tome of the Unknown	Executive producer
2013–2018	Clarence	Executive producer
2013–2020	Steven Universe	Executive producer
2014	The Powerpuff Girls: Dance Pantsed	Executive producer
2014	AJ's Infinite Summer	Executive producer
2014	Over the Garden Wall	Executive producer
2014	Pillywags Mansion	Executive producer
2014	Back to Backspace	Executive producer
2014–2015	Black Dynamite	Executive producer
2014–2016	Mixels	Executive producer
2015–2019	We Bare Bears	Executive producer
2015	Welcome to My Life	Executive producer
2015	Twelve Forever	Executive producer
2015	Ridin' with Burgess	Executive producer
2015	Jammers	Executive producer
2015	Long Live the Royals	Executive producer
2016	Victor & Valentino	Executive producer
2016	Infinity Train	Executive producer
2016	Lasso & Comet	Executive producer
2016	Good Jubies: The Making of Bad Jubies	Executive producer
2016	Bottom's Butte	Executive producer
2016–2021	Ben 10	Executive producer
2016–2018	Mighty Magiswords	Executive producer
2016–2019	The Powerpuff Girls	Executive producer
2016–2021	Apple & Onion	Executive producer
2017	Craig of the Creek	Executive producer
2017–2019	OK K.O.! Let's Be Heroes	Executive producer
2018	Tiggle Winks	Executive producer
2018	Hal	Executive producer
2018	DIY	Executive producer
2018	Legendary Place	Executive producer
2018–2021	Craig of the Creek	Executive producer
2018–2021	Summer Camp Island	Executive producer
2019	Splitting Time	Executive producer
2019	The Wonderful Wingits	Executive producer
2019	Other Music	Executive producer
2019	Mushroom and the Forest of the World	Executive producer
2019	The Fancies	Executive producer
2019	Steven Universe: The Movie	Executive producer
2019	Primal: Tales of Savager	Executive producer
2019	Mao Mao: Heroes of Pure Heart	Executive producer
2019	Pops and Branwell	Executive producer
2019–2020	Primal	Executive producer
2019–2021	Infinity Train	Executive producer
2019–2021	Victor & Valentino	Executive producer
2020	Cadette in Charge	Executive producer
2020	JJ Villard's Fairy Tales	Executive producer
2020	Adventure Time: Distant Lands	Executive producer
2020	We Bare Bears: The Movie	Executive producer
2020	Beetle + Bean	Executive producer
2020	Tig n' Seek	Executive producer
2020	The Fungies!	Executive producer
2020	Ben 10 Versus the Universe: The Movie	Executive producer
2020–2021	Close Enough	Executive producer
2021	Wild Help	Executive producer
2023	Fired on Mars	Executive producer
