= Spear and Fang =

- Primal episode
- Episode no.: Season 1 Episode 1
- Directed by: Genndy Tartakovsky
- Written by: Genndy Tartakovsky
- Original air date: October 4, 2019
- Running time: 22 minutes

Episode chronology
← Previous —	Next → "River of Snakes"
- Primal season 1

"Spear and Fang" is the series premiere of the first season of the American adult animated action-drama Primal. It premiered unannounced on Adult Swim's YouTube channel and website on October 4, 2019, before premiering on Adult Swim itself four days later on October 8, 2019. It was written and directed by Genndy Tartakovsky. In the episode, Spear (Aaron LaPlante) and Fang (Joel Valentine) independently lose their families to the same predator before uniting to kill it and roam the world together. The episode received critical acclaim, winning two Emmy Awards. It was released to home media on June 1, 2021, and was later re-edited as the television film Primal: Tales of Savagery with the following episodes "River of Snakes", "A Cold Death", and "Terror Under the Blood Moon".

== Plot ==
A Neanderthal named Spear returns from a fishing trip, and a scrape with a crocodile and a pterosaur, to find his mate and two children devoured by a trio of horned tyrannosaurs. Distraught, he contemplates suicide before resolving to take revenge. Sometime later, he sees the silhouette of a theropod. Believing it to be one of the horned tyrannosaurs that killed his family, Spear silently pursues it into a thicket, but instead finds it to be a female Tyrannosaurus named Fang, with her two offspring. Spear realizes his mistake and befriends the offspring just as they are attacked by the horned tyrannosaurs. Though Spear helps Fang kill the trio, their gargantuan alpha eats Fang's offspring before they manage to slay it, leaving Fang distraught over the loss of her hatchlings. Spear leaves Fang to mourn, but she follows and rejoins him later, and the two decide to travel together.

== Reception ==
"Spear and Fang" received critical acclaim.

== Accolades ==
Accolades received by Primal
Award	Year	Category	Recipient(s)	Result	Ref.
Primetime Creative Arts Emmy Awards	2020	Outstanding Individual Achievement in Animation	Genndy Tartakovsky (storyboard artist; for "Spear and Fang")	Won	
Primetime Creative Arts Emmy Awards	2020	Outstanding Individual Achievement in Animation	Scott Wills (art director; for "Spear and Fang")	Won	
