= Giles Matthey =

British actor (born 1987)

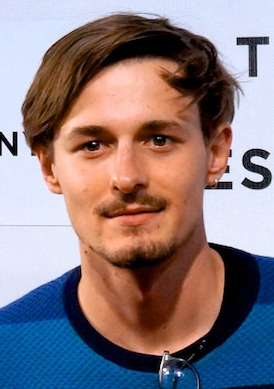
- Matthey in 2014
- Born: Giles Ingram Matthey; 11 November 1987 (age 38); Australia
- Occupation: Actor
- Years active: 2011–present
- Spouse: Gabrielle Jones (m. 2024)

Giles Ingram Matthey (born 11 November 1987) is a British actor best known for his role as Claude Crane on the HBO original series True Blood, Gideon on the ABC series Once Upon a Time, and Jordan Reed on FOX series 24: Live Another Day.

== Early life and education ==
Giles Matthey was born in Australia to a British father and an Australian mother. He moved to London with his family at the age of 2. His father (John) died when he was a child and his mother (Kerrin) is a successful Interior Designer. He has an older sister Arabella, who is a Security Consultant in Melbourne, Australia. He became interested in acting during his teenage years whist studying at Harrow School and eventually moved to New York City. In the US, he completed a two-year conservatory program at the Lee Strasberg Theatre and Film Institute.

== Career ==
Matthey's first acting job was an appearance in The Good Wife in 2011. In 2012, he was cast as Claude Crane in the HBO series True Blood. Matthey appeared in nine episodes from 2012 to 2013. He also had a supporting role as Apple design chief Jonathan Ive in Jobs, and a lead role on the 2014 independent film Boulevard with Robin Williams. In 2014, he was cast as CIA intelligence analyst Jordan Reed in FOX limited event television series 24: Live Another Day.

He also appeared in the CBS drama series NCIS playing Daniel Budd, a young man who is the leader of the terrorist group, the Calling. Matthey's role on NCIS ended when his character died in the NCIS Season 13 premiere episode as Budd was shot dead by NCIS Special Agent Anthony DiNozzo, played by Michael Weatherly. He landed a recurring role in the sixth season of the fantasy-drama series Once Upon a Time, portraying the grown-up version of Belle and Rumplestiltskin's newborn son Gideon.

== Personal life ==
In January 2023, Matthey announced his engagement to English entrepreneur Gabrielle Jones after four years of dating. They were married on 15 December 2024.

== Filmography ==
=== Film ===
Title	Year	Role	Notes
Jobs	2013	Jonathan Ive	
Hunter	2013	Carter	
Boulevard	2014	Eddie	
Submerged	2016	Todd	
The Duel	2016	John	
1BR	2019	Brian	
Ford v Ferrari	2019	Lance Reventlow	
Invitation to a Murder	2023	Phillip Armstrong	

=== Television ===
Title	Year	Role	Notes
The Good Wife	2011	Dick Anders	Episode: "Affairs of State"
True Blood	2012–13	Claude Crane	9 episodes
24: Live Another Day	2014	Jordan Reed	9 episodes
NCIS	2015	Daniel Budd	3 episodes
Once Upon a Time	2016–17	Gideon	14 episodes
Primal	2022	Blakely (voice)	Episode: "The Primal Theory"
Apples Never Fall	2024	Harry Haddad	Recurring Role
