= Primal (TV series) =

American adult animated television series

- Title card for the first season
- Also known as: Genndy Tartakovsky's Primal; Primal: Tales of Savagery
- Genre: Action; Adventure; Drama; Fantasy; Horror
- Created by: Genndy Tartakovsky
- Directed by: Genndy Tartakovsky
- Voices of: Aaron LaPlante; Laëtitia Eïdo
- Composers: Tyler Bates; Joanne Higginbottom
- Country of origin: United States
- Original languages: English; Arabic; Irish; Old Norse (Note: The series had no spoken dialogue until "Slave of the Scorpion".)
- No. of seasons: 3
- No. of episodes: 30

Production
- Executive producers: Genndy Tartakovsky; Brian A. Miller (Note: Miller, Pelphrey, Sorcher and Register are executive producers for Cartoon Network Studios.); Jennifer Pelphrey; Rob Sorcher; Sam Register; Mike Lazzo (Note: Lazzo and Crofford are executive producers for Williams Street.); Keith Crofford
- Producer: Shareena Carlson
- Animator: Studio La Cachette
- Running time: 20–22 minutes
- Production companies: Cartoon Network Studios; Williams Street

Original release
- Network: Adult Swim
- Release: October 8, 2019 – present

Primal (also known as Genndy Tartakovsky's Primal or Primal: Tales of Savagery) is an American adult animated action horror television series created by Genndy Tartakovsky for Cartoon Network's night-time programming block Adult Swim. Produced by Cartoon Network Studios, it is the first full production from the company to be developed for Adult Swim.

Primal is set in an anachronistic vision of prehistory, portraying extinct dinosaurs, prehistoric creatures of the Cenozoic era (including the Ice Age), early hominids, and post-metallurgy Homo sapiens all coexisting in a single time period, incorporating many elements of science fiction, fantasy, horror, action, and adventure. The series revolves around the journey of Spear (Aaron LaPlante), a Neanderthal, and Fang, a uniquely intelligent female Tyrannosaurus rex, both of whom lose their families tragically in the opening episode. They join forces to survive their unforgiving environment together, eventually discovering developed civilizations that they end up in conflict with. The series has no dialogue throughout its first season, before incorporating minimal dialogue in the second season with the introduction of a third character, Mira (Laëtitia Eïdo), in line with Tartakovsky's previous work.

The first 10-episode season of Primal was split into two 5-episode parts. The series premiered on Adult Swim on October 8, 2019, with the remaining episodes released daily that same week. The second half of the season premiered one episode on April 1, 2020, with the remaining episodes premiering weekly for the five weeks following October 4, 2020. In August 2020, the series was renewed for a 10-episode second season, which premiered July 22 and concluded September 16, 2022. In June 2023, Adult Swim renewed the series for a 10-episode third season. Following the second-season finale, Tartakovsky stated that Primal would become an anthology series from its forthcoming third season onward. However, Tartakovsky later backtracked on this plan. The third season premiered on January 11, 2026, and follows Spear resurrected as an undead regaining his memories and coming across various dangers whilst searching for Fang. It also takes place before the epilogue of the second season's last episode.

Primal has received critical acclaim, with much praise for its animation, storytelling, music, emotional depth, horror elements, and editing. The show has won three Outstanding Individual Achievement in Animation Juried Awards from the Emmy Awards for Storyboard Artist (Genndy Tartakovsky), Art Director (Scott Wills), and Character Designer (Stephen DeStefano).

== Plot ==
Set in an anachronistic and fantastical prehistoric world, the series is about the survival and bond between a Neanderthal man Spear and a female Tyrannosaurus rex named Fang as they struggle day-to-day and battle against various carnivorous dinosaurs, prehistoric mammals and other dangerous animals, most notably humans of the species Homo sapiens that also live in their world, including an Ancient Egyptian army and Viking-like Iron Age humans.

In season three, Spear is revived as an undead months after his sacrifice in the previous season. It is revealed that this season takes place during Mira's pregnancy with Spear's child.

== Characters ==
In comparison to Tartakovsky's other shows where there are multiple characters, Primal initially only features Spear and Fang in the show as they encounter different prehistoric or fantastical species and various tribes of hominins. Tartakovsky stated that although the show is a work of fantasy, the prehistoric animals, modern creatures and futuristic beasts in the show are based on real prehistoric animals, as well as some new ones created by the artists involved in the project. As most of the characters in the prehistorics made vocal effects, their names have been revealed in the end credits.

=== Main ===
- Spear (voiced by Aaron LaPlante as an adult, Noah Kaye Bentley as a child) – A Neanderthal whose mate and children are attacked and devoured by a pack of horned tyrannosaurs. Although he overcomes his initial urge to commit suicide, Spear is still learning to cope with the loss. Eventually, he develops a deep bond with Fang and is willing to make any personal sacrifice to protect her. Spear later befriends Mira and learns to speak her name. He later sacrifices his life to stop the empowered Chieftain, though he does manage to father a hybrid daughter with Mira before dying. In season three, Spear is reanimated as an unclothed zombie by a shaman to take vengeance on skull-wearing Ape-Men who attacked his village. When the shaman was killed by the final ape-man, Spear's zombie form gains limited sentience and wanders the land while having visions of when he was alive. He ends up having an unlikely reunion with Fang and Mira following an attack on Mira's village by a group of Andrewsarchus and is slowly revived after spending time with the Black River tribe.
- Fang – A teal female Tyrannosaurus whose hatchlings are killed by the alpha of the same horned tyrannosaur pack that killed Spear's family. Initially, she attempts to assert her dominance over Spear but eventually learns that it is far healthier to work in a partnership and is willing to do anything to ensure his survival. In season three, Fang was still living in Mira's village with her offspring following Spear's death. She had an unlikely reunion with Spear's zombie form following an attack on Mira's village by a group of Andrewsarchus.
- Mira (voiced by Laëtitia Eïdo) – A virtuous Arabic-speaking Nubian woman. Enslaved, head-shaved, and branded with a scorpion symbol by a Viking clan, Mira escapes and encounters Spear and Fang, who become her new friends and companions. She proves to be very capable with archery, spears, axes, carpentry, helmsmanship, and cooking. Following Spear's death, Mira gives birth to a hybrid daughter who was fathered by him. In season three, it was shown that Mira was pregnant following Spear's death and had an unlikely reunion with his zombie form after a group of Andrewsarchus attack her village. (seasons 2–3; guest: season 1)

=== Recurring ===
==== Season 1 ====
- Spear's family – Spear's mate, son, and daughter that were eaten by a pack of horned tyrannosaurs in the first episode, but reappear through visions and flashbacks across the series.
- Fang's first brood – Fang's first two hatchlings. Like Spear's family, they were eaten in the first episode, but reappear through visions and flashbacks across the series.

==== Season 2 ====
- The Chieftain (vocal effects provided by Fred Tatasciore) – The chieftain of the Viking tribe responsible for abducting Mira's people. He soon seeks revenge on Spear and Fang for decimating his tribe. Following his son Eldar's death, the Chieftain is transformed into a monstrous fiery juggernaut by the demonic entity in order to kill Spear and Fang in exchange for Eldar's soul. The Chieftain badly burns Spear, but fails to kill him and is dragged to the Underworld for his failure.
  - Eldar (vocal effects provided by Fred Tatasciore) – The Chieftain's eldest son. He joins his father on their quest for revenge against Spear and Fang for their tribe's destruction. He is killed in battle with Spear, Fang, and Mira.
- Demonic Entity – The unidentified ruler of the fiery Underworld who makes a deal with the Chieftain to have him kill Spear and Fang and bring him their souls in exchange for Eldar's soul. According to Genndy Tartakovsky, the entity is not necessarily a direct reference to any mythological being.
- Red – A male Tyrannosaurus whom Fang encounters, eventually becoming her new friend. However, during his fight with Spear, Red was accidentally killed by Fang, who was trying to stop the two from fighting each other. Later, it was revealed that Red mated with her when she laid a second set of eggs after losing her old ones.
- Kamau (vocal effects provided by Imari Williams) – A 10 ft (3 m) Bantu man who, while naturally peaceful, is also immensely strong. He and many of his fellow towering tribesmen were enslaved by Ima. It is revealed that Ima is holding his daughter Amal hostage which serves as leverage to force him to obey her. Spear, Fang, and Mira later free Kamau and his people who fight back against Ima's forces. Afterwards, Kamau's tribe commandeer the Colossaeus.
  - Amal (vocal effects provided by Hillary Hawkins) – Kamau's daughter.
- Ima (vocal effects provided by Amina Koroma) – A vicious Egyptian queen who resides in a large city-ship called the Colossaeus which is filled with her warriors and slaves that she uses to raid and loot other kingdoms. She takes pleasure in taking and using what and who people love most and using them as tools to get strong warriors to do her bidding, with the threat of killing what they love as leverage. She would later be killed by Kamau as his tribe takes control of the Colossaeus.
- The Chief (vocal effects provided by Dave Fennoy) - The chief of the Nubian tribe and Mira's father. He was separated from Mira when the Vikings attacked some of his people. Spear later returned Mira to him. In season three, the Chief sends Mira, Fang, and some warriors to follow the Andrewsarchus that abducted some of their tribespeople. (seasons 2–3)
- Spike and Sonja – Fang's second set of hatchlings that were born after she mated with Red. While one was killed before hatching during a fight with the Egyptians, the other two live to adulthood. In season three, they try to get involved with their mother until she relented following an Andrewsarchus attack on Mira's village. (seasons 2–3)

==== Season 3 ====
- Jabu (vocal effects provided by Debra Wilson) is a young boy in Mira's village.
- Shaman (vocal effects provided by Boise Holmes) is wielder of magic that in order to enact vengeance on the Black River became a necromancer to avenge his people. He later died to a Black River Warrior while commanding a Zombified Spear.
- Abu (vocal effects provided by Tre Mosley) is a warrior who accompanies Mira in rescuing their tribespeople from the Andrewsarchus. He is later killed in an attack by a group of baboons.
- Lu (vocal effects provided by Phil LaMarr) is a warrior who accompanies Mira in rescuing their tribespeople from the Andrewsarchus. He is later killed in an attack by a group of baboons.
- Black River chieftain: The leader of a brutal species of humanoids known as the Black River people. He is later killed during a volcanic eruption.

== Episodes ==
=== Series overview ===
Season	Episodes		Originally released	
Season	Episodes		First released	Last released
1	10	5	October 8, 2019	October 12, 2019
1	10	5	October 4, 2020	November 1, 2020
2	10		July 22, 2022	September 16, 2022
3	10		January 11, 2026	March 15, 2026

=== Season 1 (2019–20) ===
==== Part 1 ====
No. overall	No. in season	Title	Written and storyboarded by	Story by	Original release date	U.S. viewers (millions)
1	1	"Spear and Fang"	Genndy Tartakovsky	Tartakovsky	October 8, 2019 (Note: This episode was first released online on October 4, 2019.)	0.53
A Neanderthal named Spear returns from a fishing trip, and a scrape with a giant crocodile and a pterosaur, to find his wife and two children devoured by a trio of horned tyrannosaurs. Distraught, he contemplates suicide before resolving to take revenge. Sometime later, he sees the silhouette of a theropod. Believing it to be one of the horned tyrannosaurs that killed his family, Spear silently pursues it into a thicket, but instead finds it to be a female Tyrannosaurus named Fang, with her two offspring. Spear realizes his mistake and befriends the offspring just as they are attacked by the horned tyrannosaur pack. Though Spear helps Fang kill the trio, the gargantuan alpha eats Fang's offspring before they manage to slay it, leaving Fang distraught over the loss of her hatchlings. Spear leaves Fang to mourn, but she follows and rejoins him later, and the two decide to travel together.
2	2	"River of Snakes"	Genndy Tartakovsky	Darrick Bachman & Tartakovsky	October 9, 2019	0.66
While hunting, Fang consistently steals any food she and Spear come across, including a warthog, some fruit and a prehistoric deer, causing him to grow increasingly agitated at her. Eventually, Spear snaps and attacks Fang, losing his spear in the process, but their fight is interrupted when they wander into a den of snakes. A flash flood rushes them and the snakes into a swampy river, where a much bigger one attacks them, though Fang kills it. Despite working together to stay afloat, she and Spear fall down a waterfall, causing him to hit his head on the way down. Fang pulls Spear from the water at the bottom. As he comes to, Fang fetches Spear's lost weapon. They reconcile and continue their journey together, now hunting food as a team.
3	3	"A Cold Death"	David Krentz	Bryan Andrews, Darrick Bachman, Krentz & Genndy Tartakovsky	October 10, 2019	0.57
In the harshness of primordial winter, a one-tusked elderly woolly mammoth is separated from its herd and subsequently killed by Spear and Fang. Spear harvests as much meat from it as he can, using its tusk to pull a makeshift sled and its pelt to keep warm. When the dead mammoth's herd comes across their desecrated elder, they follow the sled's tracks and attack Spear and Fang. The pair attempt to fight them off but are quickly overwhelmed by their power and numbers. In a final act of desperation, Spear defends himself with the elder mammoth's tusk and notices that the other mammoths stop their attack upon seeing it. He returns the tusk to the mammoths, who leave the pair in peace and bring it to their graveyard to mourn.
4	4	"Terror Under the Blood Moon"	Don Shank & Genndy Tartakovsky	Bryan Andrews, Darrick Bachman & Tartakovsky	October 11, 2019	0.55
After Spear and Fang escape a pack of raptors, they experience a lunar eclipse and encounter a tribe of albino monkey-like cavemen being attacked by a flock of dinosaur-sized man-bats. They attempt to fight the man-bats off, but Spear is carried away by one with his spear left behind with an albino caveman. Fang pursues the man-bats to a tall stone pillar, which she finds impossible to climb. Seeing two of the man-bats emerging from the top, she plays dead and allows them to carry her to a cave at the peak. While searching for Spear, Fang discovers the nest of a giant spider that the man-bats share their food with. Fang frees Spear, who helps her kill the spider. As the man-bat flock returns, Spear and Fang use the spider's webbing to descend the pillar safely. Spear retrieves his spear from said albino caveman as he and Fang flee from the man-bat flock and lead them into a fight with the raptors before safely escaping towards the rising sun. Cast: Tom Kenny as Monkey #1 and Monkey #2
5	5	"Rage of the Ape-Men"	Bryan Andrews & Genndy Tartakovsky	Andrews, Darrick Bachman & Tartakovsky	October 12, 2019	0.65
Spear and Fang reach a seemingly peaceful oasis and relax before they are captured by a vicious tribe of ape-men that hold a brutal tournament to the death, with one of them eventually winning. After the gorilla-themed gladiator, Krog drinks a black elixir from the shaman, which mutates and enrages him, Fang is lowered into the arena for him to fight. Helplessly watching as Fang is beaten to near death, Spear breaks free from his bindings and drinks the rest of the elixir, causing him to transform into a raging monster. After killing Krog, Spear proceeds to massacre the other ape-men one by one, leaving no survivors by the end. When Spear eventually returns to normal, he runs to Fang's side as she lies motionless. Cast: Jon Olson as Krog and Shaman

==== Part 2 ====
No. overall	No. in season	Title	Written and storyboarded by	Story by	Original release date	U.S. viewers (millions)
6	6	"Scent of Prey"	Bryan Andrews	Andrews, Darrick Bachman & Genndy Tartakovsky	October 4, 2020	0.44
Spear agonizes over the apparent loss of Fang after the events of his fight against the ape-men. Fang proves to still be alive but is too weak to move. Seeing that the ape-men corpses are attracting a flock of vultures, Spear builds a litter to carry Fang and fashions a new spear for himself. He struggles to nurse her back to health while simultaneously trying to fend off a pack of scavenging painted dogs while she is in her helpless state. As the pack grows and continues stalking the pair, Spear and Fang are forced to take shelter in a cave, where Spear has to fight flesh-eating beetles. When the pack attacks the cave in large numbers, Spear fights off the bunch of wild dogs until Fang emerges from the cave and helps Spear annihilate their assailants.
7	7	"Plague of Madness"	David Krentz	Bryan Andrews, Darrick Bachman, Krentz & Genndy Tartakovsky	April 1, 2020 (Stealth premiere)	0.53
7	7	"Plague of Madness"	David Krentz	Bryan Andrews, Darrick Bachman, Krentz & Genndy Tartakovsky	October 11, 2020	0.40
An Argentinosaurus is infected with a flesh-eating virus by a diseased Parasaurolophus, transforming it into a zombie-like state and compelling it to brutally slaughter its herd. Spear and Fang stumble across the devastated nesting grounds and become the crazed sauropod's next target. Running for their lives, the duo trick the zombified behemoth over a cliff and into a narrow ravine before finally escaping by making a mad dash across a lava field. The sauropod's massive weight makes it fall into the magma, which incinerates it to ash as Spear and Fang observe its final agonizing moments in grief. Note: This episode made an unannounced premiere on April 1, 2020, as part of Adult Swim's annual April Fools' Day stunt, as a joking reference to the COVID-19 pandemic.
8	8	"Coven of the Damned"	Nagisa Koyama & Genndy Tartakovsky	Bryan Andrews, Darrick Bachman & Tartakovsky	October 18, 2020	0.46
Spear and Fang come across a mind-controlled Pteranodon and a tribe of primitive witches during a ritual; the lead witch uses dark magic to steal the essence of a male red-haired caveman and birth a female baby, which she gives to a follower as her daughter. The witches spot Spear and Fang and give chase to the duo, capturing Spear and magically controlling Fang. A witch named Lula uses her magic to travel into both of their pasts and watches the tragedies that befell them. Having lost a daughter of her own, Lula saves the pair from the other witches, ultimately sacrificing herself by stalling the lead witch to help them escape. Fang and Spear mourn the loss of their savior before continuing into the jungle. In the afterlife, Lula reunites with her daughter. Cast: Amanda Troop as Lula, Kira, Baba, Deena, and Haga
9	9	"The Night Feeder"	Genndy Tartakovsky	Darrick Bachman & Tartakovsky	October 25, 2020	0.35
Spear and Fang find the mangled remains of a Smilodon killed by an unseen dinosaur. While Spear wants to investigate it, Fang runs away in fear. The next night, the mysterious creature kills a herd of Triceratops. Hearing the carnage, Spear tries to intervene, but Fang refuses to let him go anywhere near the area. The next day, Spear and Fang hear bizarre screeching while braving a powerful storm. Later that night, the unknown creature attacks the duo, forcing them to flee into a misty forest. The creature catches up to them, and they struggle against the unseen foe, but Fang manages to wound it, in the process discovering tar-like slime that comes from its body. As the beast emits earsplitting shrieks, Spear learns of its weakness to light. Using sparks from his weapon, Spear and Fang create a ring of fire to trap the now exposed creature and kill it by igniting the slime.
10	10	"Slave of the Scorpion"	David Krentz	Bryan Andrews, Darrick Bachman, Krentz & Genndy Tartakovsky	November 1, 2020	0.34
While fishing, Spear and Fang encounter a bound, bald-headed tall woman with a scorpion brand on the back of her head fleeing from a Liopleurodon that Spear fights off. The three take a mutual interest in each other, and the woman joins Spear and Fang on their travels. She introduces herself as Mira and uses a combination of Arabic and sand drawings to tell them how her people were enslaved by invaders before she escaped. She even uses her advanced knowledge to make a bow and arrows to hunt for food. The next morning, Mira is kidnapped by a group of cave-dwelling ape-men. Spear and Fang follow, but find the ape-men killed by arrows and strange footprints. The pair follow the footprints to the beach, where they see Mira bound on a boat with a sail marked with the same scorpion sigil branded on her head. Unable to continue their pursuit, Spear and Fang watch helplessly, with Spear saying Mira's name. Cast: Laëtitia Eïdo as Mira

=== Season 2 (2022) ===
No. overall	No. in season	Title	Written and storyboarded by	Story by	Original release date	U.S. viewers (millions)
11	1	"Sea of Despair"	Genndy Tartakovsky	Darrick Bachman & Tartakovsky	July 22, 2022	0.18
Determined to rescue Mira after her abduction, Spear attempts to swim after the boat whilst frantically shouting her name, but fails. Refusing to give up, he builds a makeshift raft with Fang's help. The duo set sail, with Spear paddling them out to sea before Fang uses her tail to propel them. After Spear searches for food for some time, the duo manages to kill a large sea turtle, which they feast on before Spear uses its shell to construct a shelter. Days later, while collecting a bounty of fish, the raft sails into a storm, where the duo encounter a flock of Ornithocheirus and a Megalodon that destroys their vessel. After a struggle, Spear manages to blind the shark, but the violent waves separate him and Fang. Washed ashore on an unknown beach, Fang awakens alone and searches for Spear, who is nowhere to be seen.
12	2	"Shadow of Fate"	David Krentz & Genndy Tartakovsky	Darrick Bachman & Tartakovsky	July 22, 2022	0.16
Separated from Spear in a strange new land, Fang explores her surroundings and encounters Red, a male Tyrannosaurus whom she competes for prey when they stalk a Arsinoitherium. Fang eventually befriended him. Meanwhile, an unconscious and injured Spear washes ashore and is discovered by Celtic warriors, who take him to their village. Spear is startled awake by a one-eyed medicine woman and violently attempts to escape despite being pursued by the warriors until the village Chief stops the group and offers Spear food and water. As the medicine woman treats Spear's wounds, Red leads Fang to the village to attack the villagers. Spear and Fang reunite, and Fang tries to keep Spear and Red from harming each other to no avail. As Spear and the villagers scuffle and battle Red, Fang attempts to protect Spear but accidentally kills her new friend in the process. After comforting the dying Red, a depressed Fang leaves the village with a remorseful Spear in tow despite the Chief's pleas. Cast: Adam Fergus as Chief
13	3	"Dawn of Man"	Genndy Tartakovsky	Darrick Bachman & Tartakovsky	July 29, 2022	0.20
While Spear and Fang, who is still mourning Red's death, take shelter from the rain in a cave, Spear discovers cave paintings. The next day, he finds a valley teeming with large elk and giant bison, and has visions of people from the cave paintings. After acquiring a new spear from a nearby abandoned village, Spear hunts for himself and Fang. Later that night, Spear and Fang are attacked by a pair of Viking warriors riding on cave bears. Though Spear is injured, the pair manage to defeat both the cave bears and one of the Vikings. Recognizing the scorpion sigil on the remaining warrior's shield, Spear calls out Mira's name. The Viking flees, but the two give chase and Fang kills him while Spear takes his sword. The two follow the cave bear tracks to a populated village, where Spear finds a group of slaves and reunites with Mira, who is delighted to hear him speak. Spear tries to get Mira to leave, but she refuses to leave her people behind. Spear and Mira lead the others out of the village before Spear hears something growling in the nearby mist.
14	4	"The Red Mist"	Mark Andrews	Darrick Bachman & Genndy Tartakovsky	August 5, 2022	0.23
Viking warriors and their pet cave bears emerge from the mist. Mira and her people bow in fear, angering Spear. He and Fang battle the warriors while Mira and her people flee into the forest. The duo are overwhelmed, with Fang being injured by a female warrior named Rikka while Spear accidentally kills Rikka's son. Under the cover of a red mist, the pair give into their rage and kill the remaining warriors before they return to their senses and escape with Mira using a stolen boat. Sometime later, another boat arrives carrying the Vikings' Chieftain, his eldest son Eldar, and a small group of slaves. After discovering the massacre, they become devastated over the loss of their clan, the Chieftain's wife Rikka, and their youngest son. They soon bury their clan members, free the slaves, and give their deceased family a ceremonial ship funeral. Seeking revenge, they set sail to hunt down the ones responsible for the destruction of their village. Cast: Fred Tatasciore as Chieftain and Eldar, MyAnna Buring as Rika, Darin De Paul as Viking A, Viking B, and Viking D
15	5	"The Primal Theory"	Genndy Tartakovsky	Darrick Bachman & Tartakovsky	August 12, 2022	0.31
In 1890 England, Charles unsuccessfully tries to defend his theory on evolution to his fellow scientists Lord Darlington, Blakely, Bertie, and Giroud. A constable stops by and warns them that an inmate from the nearby asylum has escaped and to be on alert. Charles surmises that, in the right situation, any person would regress back to their primitive roots to survive, which Darlington arrogantly dismisses as lunacy. The evening is cut short when the escaped inmate (who resembles Spear in figure) breaks into the house, kills the butler, the cook Mrs. Kensington, and proceeds to prey on every person inside, including Giroud and Bertie. As the night progresses, the three survivors take on weapons in Darlington's collection; such as rifles and revolvers, then swords and archery. In the ensuing fight, Blakely is eventually knocked out by the inmate. Charles and Darlington pursue the inmate to the greenhouse, but he overpowers them and attempts to cannibalize Charles. In a fit of primal rage, Darlington attacks and kills the inmate with a bone and a spear. Coming back to his senses, he looks at an injured and winded Charles who is pleased with being vindicated. Cast: Jacob Dudman as Charles and Stevens, Fred Tatasciore as Giroud and Mad-Man, Giles Matthey as Blakely, Jeremy Crutchley as Lord Darlington
16	6	"Vidarr"	Genndy Tartakovsky	Darrick Bachman & Tartakovsky	August 19, 2022	0.27
Mira tends to an injured Spear and Fang while taking their boat upriver, but they are attacked by the Chieftain and Eldar. As Mira takes command of the Vikings' ship, Eldar is thrown overboard, forcing the Chieftain to abandon the fight to save him. The trio is forced to dock to repair the ship, during which Spear realizes Fang is about to lay a clutch of eggs following her time with Red and eagerly helps her prepare. Meanwhile, the Chieftain tends to his and Eldar's injuries. That night, his dreams are haunted by an ominous horned figure. The next day, Fang lays her eggs but does not allow Spear to approach them. The Chieftain and Eldar mount on the two giant vultures to attack the trio. Spear and Mira fight while Fang protects her eggs. The battle is soon taken to the sky, where the Chieftain and Eldar fall from their mounts. The Chieftain survives, but witnesses Eldar fall to his death. Left with nothing to fight for, the grieving Chieftain allows himself to be swept away by the river. Spear and Mira fly on their stolen mounts and reunite with Fang, who allows Spear to approach her eggs. Cast: Fred Tatasciore as Chieftain and Eldar
17	7	"The Colossaeus, Part I"	David Krentz & Genndy Tartakovsky	Darrick Bachman & Tartakovsky	August 26, 2022	0.21
The Chieftain succumbs to his wounds and sees three valkyries approaching him from the sky. Before they can reach him, he is dragged to the underworld by demons and brought before the demonic entity from his dreams, who offers him the chance to get his revenge on Spear and Fang on the promise of releasing Eldar's soul if he succeeds. Wanting Eldar back, the Chieftain agrees and is transformed into an infernal juggernaut. Meanwhile, Mira, Spear, and Fang set sail to reunite with Mira's people, but encounter the Colossaeus, a city-sized ship, and are boarded by Egyptian warriors. Spear and Mira defeat several of them, but struggle against Kamau, a giant warrior. The ensuing fight leads to one of Fang's eggs being destroyed and the warriors' queen Ima taking the remaining two hostage as she breaks up the fight. Spear and Fang are imprisoned on the Colossaeus alongside Kamau, who is also a slave, while Mira is imprisoned with other women. Ima uses the eggs as leverage to force Fang and Spear to join Kamau and her soldiers in laying siege to a Babylonian city. Though reluctant, the pair break through the city gates, killing the Babylonian soldiers and a group of war elephants as the Babylonian king emerges from his palace. Cast: Fred Tatasciore as Chieftain, Imari Williams as Kamau
18	8	"The Colossaeus, Part II"	Genndy Tartakovsky	Darrick Bachman & Tartakovsky	September 2, 2022	0.24
The reborn Chieftain rises from the underworld and begins searching for the group. After Ima's soldiers kill the Babylonian king and take his pet leopard cub, Spear discovers that Kamau only fights for Ima because she holds his daughter Amal hostage. After Spear, Fang and Kamau invade villages in Rome, China and Slavic lands, and battle a Philistine fleet, they encounter a peaceful Indian village offering them tributes, but Ima forces Kamau to massacre the defenseless villagers anyway. That night, Spear breaks out of his cell and searches for Fang's eggs. He finds Ima forcing Mira to dance for her with the eggs and Amal next to her throne after Ima kills the captive Philistine fleet leader. The guards engage Spear as Mira rescues the eggs and Kamau's daughter. Fighting their way across the Colossaeus, the eggs hatch and the hatchlings cry out, inciting Fang to escape her cell. As Kamau leaves his cell to investigate the chaos, the outnumbered group is forced to surrender Fang's hatchlings and Amal as Ima looks expectantly at the approaching Kamau. Cast: Imari Williams as Kamau, Soldier #3, and Soldier #4, Amina Koroma as Ima, Hillary Hawkins as Amal
19	9	"The Colossaeus, Part III"	David Krentz	Darrick Bachman & Genndy Tartakovsky	September 9, 2022	0.30
A flashback details how Kamau and Amal lived peacefully in a pastoral Bantu village herding quaggas and raising chickens until Ima's forces invaded. Only Kamau resisted, but Ima held Amal hostage after she was ripped off his back by one of Ima's soldiers. In the present, Ima commands Kamau to execute Fang. After grappling with whether to comply, he frees Fang. She reunites with her hatchlings while Spear and Mira free themselves and fight off Ima's warriors. Ima attempts to kill Amal, but Kamau rescues her and discovers the rest of his tribe in the Colossaeus's lower deck. As Spear fights a losing battle against Ima, a warrior's arrow injures one of Fang's hatchlings. Mira and Spear retrieve the hatchlings and jump overboard to escape causing Fang to follow shortly. Kamau inspires his people to break free and throws Ima to her death. Spear, Fang, and Mira take over a smaller ship, freeing the slaves within. Spear and Kamau part on good terms before Spear's group sails away. As Kamau's tribe recuperates, they see the demonic Chieftain walking on the water, following the others' trail. Cast: Imari Williams as Kamau, Amina Koroma as Ima, Ike Amadi as Warrior #1, Warrior #2, and Warrior #3, Stefan Johnson as Warrior #4, Warrior #5, and Warrior #6, Hillary Hawkins as Amal
20	10	"Echoes of Eternity"	Genndy Tartakovsky	Darrick Bachman & Tartakovsky	September 16, 2022	0.28
Spear dreams of his childhood when a pack of Smilodons attacked his tribe and killed his father. Spear killed the Smilodons and became the new leader. Mira wakes Spear as they arrive at her homeland. She recalls how the Vikings killed her loved ones, enslaved her, and how she fled under cover of a storm. The group makes camp in a cave where Spear joins Mira in praying to the moon. The next morning, Mira reunites with her Nubian tribe. Her father calls for a celebration that night after which Mira provides shelter for Spear, Fang, and her hatchlings. The next day, the Chieftain attacks the village, overwhelming Spear and Fang with his newfound fiery powers and shapeshifting ability. After the Chieftain corners them on top of a mountain, Spear tackles him off the peak, but is gravely burned and wounded in the process. However, the demonic entity's hand bursts from the ground, reverting the Chieftain to normal and dragging him back to the underworld for his failure to kill Spear and Fang. The village shaman tends to Spear but declares his wounds fatal. As Fang and her hatchlings leave in grief, Spear calls out to Mira and the two copulate before Spear dies. Years later, Mira, her and Spear's daughter, and Fang and her offspring head out. Cast: Fred Tatasciore as Chieftain, Warrior, and Villager, Dave Fennoy as Mira's Dad and Villager, Noah Kaye Bentley as Young Spear, Amina Koroma as Amara, Ali Zayn as Villager and Warrior, Lilah Tartakovsky as Spear's Daughter

=== Season 3 (2026) ===
No. overall	No. in season	Title	Written and storyboarded by	Story by	Original release date
21	1	"Vengeance of Death"	Genndy Tartakovsky	Darrick Bachman & Tartakovsky	January 11, 2026
Following an attack on Mira's village, a surviving shaman journeys to the catacombs and uses magic to reanimate and control Spear's corpse to enact vengeance. Spear attacks the invaders (a group of skull-faced ape-men), overwhelming them until the sole survivor kills the shaman and severs the magical control over Spear's mind. Despite Spear having part of his scalp sliced off, he is unfazed and the last ape-man flees. Spear wanders aimlessly and arrives at a watering hole, frightening away the animals drinking there including (zebras, antelopes and a single elephant). An crocodile attempts to eat him, but he manages to kill it. A storm picks up and Spear, prompted by a vision of his children's deaths, saves a leper from drowning. The leper takes Spear to his leper colony in a desert, where Spear's visions of his previous life continue. Later that night, a Bedouin assassin cavalry attack the leper colony. Spear attacks the raiders before leading them away from the village and killing all but a couple of them, who choose to flee. Before the leper can bring him back to the colony, Spear hears a distant roar and has a vision of Fang, prompting him to head further into the desert. Cast: Boise Holmes as Shaman, Fred Tatasciore as Main Leper, Vanessa Marshall as Female Leper
22	2	"Kingdom of Sorrow"	David Krentz	Darrick Bachman & Genndy Tartakovsky	January 18, 2026
Spear wanders aimlessly, scaring a herd of Sivatherium. A distant roar awakens more visions of Fang and he heads in the direction of the sound. In the desert, a giant fanged sandworm attacks Spear; while he ends up severely injured, he is saved by the arrival of sunrise. Spear continues onward, dreaming of his former self before his death, and awakens to a rainstorm. Spear climbs up a tree for shelter after realizing that the sandworm is still following him. The next day, Spear follows the roaring to mountains before stumbling upon the ruins of an ancient city home to a pride of lions. The lions attack and nearly overwhelm Spear until the ground breaks beneath them, causing them all to descend into an underwater cavern which Spear escapes while the lions drown. Spear later fights and kills two lions that attack him, only to find himself back in the city and surrounded by more lions. A giant black-furred lion reveals itself as the alpha and attacks Spear, overpowering him until Spear finds a nearby spear and impales the alpha through the throat, killing it. The lions, now leaderless, decide to leave Spear alone and retreat as he hears another distant roar and follows after it, leaving the spear behind.
23	3	"Feast of Flesh"	Mark Andrews & Genndy Tartakovsky	Darrick Bachman & Tartakovsky	January 25, 2026
Spear wanders into a jungle where he begins to have visions of Fang after encountering a cricket with a similar coloration to her. He becomes very protective of the insect, even saving it from being eaten by a chameleon. After it flies up into a tree, Spear follows it only to fall and crash through the ground into an underground cave. He encounters and kills a ravenous moleman, but not before it calls forth a colony of similar creatures that overwhelm and capture Spear. He awakens held captive in their lair, a primitive meat locker, where his right hand is already in the process of being eaten by one of the molemen, leaving only his bones behind. The cricket arrives and distracts the cave-dwellers long enough for Spear to free himself, but is smashed to death by one of the molemen. Spear, once again envisioning Fang, is sent into a rage. Grabbing a nearby spear, he single-handedly slaughters the entire colony of molemen in one by one before burying the cricket. Taking the spear along with some clothing and a toothed necklace, Spear exits the underground cave back into the jungle, where he is greeted by numerous crickets before he continues his journey following another vision of Fang. Cast: Fred Tatasciore as Moleman #1, Dee Bradley Baker as Moleman #2, Jon Olson as Moleman #3
24	4	"Prey for the Wicked"	Genndy Tartakovsky	Darrick Bachman & Tartakovsky	February 1, 2026
Following Spear's death, Mira and her village hold a ceremonial burial for the deceased Spear. Months later, Fang lives in Mira's village with her offspring by playing with child named Jabu, while Mira is pregnant with Spear's child. One night, a pack of bloodthirsty Andrewsarchus attack the village and abduct villagers in their jaws. Though Fang and her kin kill several, the beasts retreat with several villagers. The village holds a council; Mira volunteers to go hunt for her people with a rescue party, with Fang and her offspring joining to track their scents. The Andrewsarchus take their captives back to their lair to be eaten by their mammoth albino mother, who then rewards her offspring by feeding them her milk. Mira's group reach a jungle and discover the corpses of their shaman and the skull-faced ape-men. Noticing the shaman's staff, party members Abu and Lu ignite a ritualistic fire around it. That night, Mira's group is ambushed by the Andrewsarchus. Despite slaying several of them, they are ultimately overwhelmed by the Andrewsarchus' sheer numbers, resulting in party member Daqiq being killed and party member Symka being taken away. Before the Andrewsarchus can attack the group further, they pick up a scent and flee. Spear then emerges from behind foliage. Cast: Debra Wilson as Jabu, Jabu's Mother, and Daqiq, Dave Fennoy as Chief, Tre Mosley as Symka and Abu, Phil LaMarr as Ghashim and Lu
25	5	"The Dead Cast No Shadow"	David Krentz	Darrick Bachman & Genndy Tartakovsky	February 8, 2026
While Abu and Lu become fearful and attempt to protect themselves with a ritual, Mira attempts to reconnect with Spear. Spear recognizes Fang and becomes overjoyed finally reuniting with her, but Fang, unable to recognize Spear as she is too horrified and disgusted at seeing the sight of his zombified state and mistakenly believing him to be a threat, becomes hostile towards Spear; prejudicing him for being half dead. Mira attempts to get Spear to recognize her by saying her name and showing him their unborn child, but to no avail as she believes Spear has lost his memories. The next day, the rescue team continue following the Andrewsarchus with Spear following them until they reach a jungle. There, Spear and Fang fight over a warthog they hunted before a group of feral and ferocious baboons suddenly attack the group, killing Abu and Lu and kidnapping Mira. This ambush forces Spear, Fang, and her brood to give chase. The baboons attempt to feed Mira to their young, but she escapes before getting cornered by three adults. Mira is saved by Spear, who kills the primates, uses his body to cushion her fall from the treetops, and ends up tearing his shoulder. A thankful Mira uses her sewing skills to repair Spear's damaged arm, with her and Fang's brood accepting him. However, Fang, still believing the zombified Spear is a threat, remains hostile towards him. Cast: Tre Mosley as Abu, Phil LaMarr as Lu
26	6	"Cavern of Horrors"	Mark Andrews & Genndy Tartakovsky	Darrick Bachman & Tartakovsky	February 15, 2026
The group eventually discover the lair of the Andrewsarchus with Mira and Spear scouting inside while Fang and her brood wait outside. They find Mira's people at the cost of almost being discovered by an Andrewsarchus. Mira later returns to scout out the area alone. Spear attempts to reconnect with Fang and get her to recognize him, only for her to continue rejecting him while her brood eagerly accept him. While the Andrewsarchus feed, Mira attempts to save abducted child Jabu, but accidentally alerts the rest of the captives and send them into a panic trying to escape and alerting the Andrewsarchus. Hearing the commotion, Spear, Fang, and her kin barge into the lair and attack the Andrewsarchus. After killing almost all the beasts, the mother Andrewsarchus awakens and attacks Fang, sending Spear into a rage before she defeats him. After attacking her children, Fang manages to kill the mother Andrewsarchus by tearing out her throat. A remaining Andrewsarchus attacks Mira and throws her into a wall which knocks her unconscious before Spear kills it and attempts to help Mira, but before he can do so, he is suddenly kept away by an enraged Fang, who mistakenly believes Spear was going to harm Mira. Jabu and Fang's kin check on a bloody and unmoving Mira. Cast: Tre Mosley as Amar, Debra Wilson as Jabu
27	7	"Heart of the Undead"	David Krentz	Darrick Bachman & Genndy Tartakovsky	February 22, 2026
The injured and unconscious Mira is brought back to the village. There, the villagers, terrified and disgusted at seeing Spear's zombified state and mistakenly believing he is a threat, reject him before chasing him out of their village while Fang watches. That night, Spear attempts to sneak back into the village to check on Mira, but before he can do so, he is confronted by Fang, who, having sensed his return, blocks his path to prevent him from entering Mira's house before alerting the villagers of Spear's presence, ignoring her brood's pleas as they attempt to convince their mother to let Spear see Mira. Spear is forced to flee once again. The next day, Mira awakens with an injured leg and is told by Jabu of what happened the previous night while she was unconscious. Furious at Fang for purposely betraying Spear and for aiding her people in kicking him out of her village, Mira heads off into the jungle to search for Spear. Meanwhile, Spear reaches a waterfall, discovers his zombified state through the water's reflection and begins to hallucinate the various rejection and animosity he has faced before he falls off the waterfall into the rapids below. Fang and her brood follow Mira and attempt to help her track down Spear, but lose his trail by the waterfall. Believing Spear committed suicide, Mira is left in despair while Fang feels remorseful for her actions. Meanwhile, Spear is washed away into a volcanic region. Memories of the infected Argentinosaurus' death led him to believe he can be destroyed by the volcano and begins his climb. Spear discovers several spears ornamented with skulls before coming across an ashen warrior. Cast: Debra Wilson as Jabu, Fred Tatasciore as Villager
28	8	"The River of Life"	Genndy Tartakovsky	Darrick Bachman & Tartakovsky	March 1, 2026
Spear stumbles upon a traditional gladiatorial death match of the Black River people, wherein the champion faces off against a challenger and the winner is crowned the champion and leader of the volcanic tribe. Spear unwillingly becomes the challenger, faces off against their champion Killax, kills him, and is crowned the victor. Taken to the volcanic tribe's village, Spear learns of a river of black liquid and remembers that the ape-men and their champion Krog used it to nearly defeat him and Fang. The tribe's chieftain rewards Spear with the elixir with each of his victories, mending his injuries. Meanwhile, Mira gives birth to a baby girl. At night, Mira is plagued by nightmares of a volcano and Spear's kills. Elsewhere, Spear has visions of Mira and furtively returns to her village with the aid of a dead Scottish warrior's pterosaur. He finds Mira well and is overjoyed to see their newborn daughter. He flees when Mira awakens and almost catches sight of him. However, she still feels he was around and uses her village's maps to deduce Spear's location. Meanwhile, Spear continues fighting matches. Cast: Fred Tatasciore as Killax, Thog, Brog, and Villager #1, Jon Olson as Bathos and Villager #2
29	9	"The Hollow Crown"	Genndy Tartakovsky	Darrick Bachman & Tartakovsky	March 8, 2026
With the knowledge of his daughter, Spear's battle instincts begin to falter in the matches. His constant use of the elixir returns his memories and heals him nearly to his old human self. He takes up mementos from his most recent opponents to craft a doll for his daughter and make cave paintings of his family as his lack of combat brutality does not go unnoticed by the chieftain. Meanwhile, Mira, Fang, and the kids continue their journey through the waterfalls to find Spear. En route, they cross over a skull-shaped mountain border into the thicket jungles beyond towards the volcanic region. Elsewhere, the chieftain offers up Spear a female of his tribe as a concubine. Spear refuses the offer and takes his pterosaur back to Mira's village to bring the doll to his daughter. Back in the jungle, the group is attacked by a werejaguar, whom Fang brutally fights to protect the others. Realizing that he has nearly returned to his old self (although his right hand is all skeleton), Spear finds Mira, Fang, and the kids missing at Mira's village. With his pterosaur, he tracks their path from their footprints and races to find and rescue his family. Cast: Fred Tatasciore as Brog, Monk, and Thurr
30	10	"An Echo of Eternity"	Genndy Tartakovsky	Darrick Bachman & Tartakovsky	March 15, 2026
Spear enters the jungle and finds the corpse of the werejaguar whom Fang had killed during their fight before finding his family and a grievously injured Fang and reunites with them. Mira and Fang's offspring are not only relieved that Spear is alive, but are also shocked and surprised that he has returned to his old human self and no longer in his zombified state (although his right hand is still skeletal thanks to one of the mole people) before Mira introduces Spear to their daughter. Spear also reconciles and apologizes to Fang, who, realizing that Spear is no longer zombified and back to his human self upon catching his scent, reconciles with him while apologizing for her behavior towards him. However, their reunion is soon interrupted when the group is ambushed by the Black River people and drugged with blow darts. The chieftain takes Spear's daughter hostage as a chained Spear is forced to watch Mira, Fang, and her offspring be force-fed the black elixir, mutating them into monstrous creatures who start fighting one another to the death. Spear breaks free of his bindings and tries to stop the fighting. The volcano erupts during the fight, creating a fissure that separates the mutant group with its damaged terrain and killing most of the tribe, including the chieftain. During this event, Spear rescues his daughter. A mutant Mira attacks her daughter, but the latter's cries of pain release her mother from the transformation. Spear uses the lava to break Fang's offspring out of their transformations but fails to do so with Fang herself and ultimately fights her. Fang breaks free of her transformation upon hearing Spear's screams and saves him from falling into the lava, after which the group flees the volcanic fields and back to the village. Years later, Spear (with his right hand fully regenerated and returned to normal) is fully restored and with his family. Cast: Lilah Tartakovsky as Spear and Mira's Daughter

== Production ==
=== Conception and development ===
According to Tartakovsky, Primal was an early piece of work he scrapped because it did not click with him at the time. As he learned more about what drew people into his shows, he wanted to experiment with those artistic traits, particularly the use of no dialogue and slow moments. He also stated that the method in which he approached animated projects began to slow down in terms of energy, and by the time he finished working on Hotel Transylvania 3: Summer Vacation (2018), it had come full circle. He said he was inspired by Conan the Barbarian and vintage pulp novels, as well as films such as The Revenant. Tartakovsky felt that people would not take the show seriously because they were "breaking the rules" by having "a man and a dinosaur together," so he emphasized that it is a character study, a "buddies" journey about two characters who are very different but bonded by tragedy.

The first season consists of 10 episodes. On August 31, 2020, the series was renewed for a second season, which consists of 10 episodes. On June 16, 2023, the series was renewed for a third season, which again consists of 10 episodes.

== Broadcast ==
The first season premiered on October 8, 2019, with episodes from the first half of the season airing daily from the premiere date. An episode from the second half was shown during Adult Swim's April Fools' Day 2020 run. Adult Swim announced on their Twitter that the second half would premiere on October 4, 2020.

The first season of Primal was broadcast during Thanksgiving weekend on Adult Swim's Toonami programming block for the first time on November 29, 2020. The marathon commemorated the launch of the series on the HBO Max streaming service. The first season began a second run on the normal schedule of the Toonami block beginning on May 15, 2022.

The second season premiered on July 22, 2022. The third season premiered on January 11, 2026, with sequential encores on Toonami the following week.

== Home media release ==
The first season was released on DVD and Blu-ray on June 1, 2021, by Warner Bros. Home Entertainment. It was later released in France, the Netherlands and Belgium. The second season was released on DVD and Blu-ray on April 25, 2023. The third season was released on DVD and Blu-ray on June 30, 2026.

== Reception ==
=== Critical response ===
Initial reception for Primal was highly positive; much praise was given to the art and animation, the use of storytelling with no dialogue, and the balancing of the show's interpretation of violence and beauty. In a review from IndieWire, Steve Greene wrote "Primal is a piece of elemental storytelling that finds some real emotional depth without either of its protagonists uttering a single word of dialogue", ultimately giving the series an "A−". On Rotten Tomatoes, the first season has an approval rating of 100% based on reviews from 23 critics, with an average rating of 9.1/10. The site's critical consensus states: "Epic in every sense, Genndy Tartakovsky's Primal is a stunning feat of visual storytelling." The second season has an approval rating of 100% based on reviews from 15 critics, with an average rating of 9.1/10. The site's critical consensus states: "Primal evolves into a more serialized tale while losing none of its beautiful savagery in a second season that exemplifies Genndy Tartakovsky's knack for storytelling economy." The third season has an approval rating of 100% based on reviews from 10 critics. On Metacritic, the first season of the series has a weighted average score of 87 out of 100 based on 5 critic reviews, indicating "universal acclaim", and the second season has a weighted average score of 97 out of 100 based on 4 critic reviews, indicating "universal acclaim".

=== Awards and nominations ===
Accolades received by Primal
Award	Year	Category	Recipient(s)	Result	Ref.
Annie Awards	2021	Best General Audience Animated Television/Broadcast Production	Primal	Won	
Annie Awards	2021	Outstanding Achievement for Directing in an Animated Television/Broadcast Production	Genndy Tartakovsky (for "Plague of Madness")	Won	
Annie Awards	2023	Outstanding Achievement for Production Design in an Animated Television / Broadcast Production	Scott Wills (for "Echoes of Eternity")	Nominated	
Critics' Choice Awards	2023	Best Animated Series	Primal	Nominated	
Primetime Creative Arts Emmy Awards	2020	Outstanding Individual Achievement in Animation	Stephen DeStefano (character designer; for "A Cold Death")	Won	
Primetime Creative Arts Emmy Awards	2020	Outstanding Individual Achievement in Animation	Genndy Tartakovsky (storyboard artist; for "Spear and Fang")	Won	
Primetime Creative Arts Emmy Awards	2020	Outstanding Individual Achievement in Animation	Scott Wills (art director; for "Spear and Fang")	Won	
Primetime Creative Arts Emmy Awards	2021	Outstanding Animated Program	Genndy Tartakovsky, Brian A. Miller, Jennifer Pelphrey, Keith Crofford, Mike Lazzo, Oussama Bouacheria, Julien Chheng, Ulysse Malassagne, Erika Forzy, Shareena Carlson, Darrick Bachman, David Krentz, and Bryan Andrews (for "Plague of Madness")	Won	
Primetime Creative Arts Emmy Awards	2021	Outstanding Individual Achievement in Animation	David Krentz (storyboard artist; for "Plague of Madness")	Won	
Primetime Creative Arts Emmy Awards	2023	Outstanding Animated Program	Genndy Tartakovsky, Mike Lazzo, Keith Crofford, Brian A. Miller, Jennifer Pelphrey, Oussama Bouacheria, Julien Chheng, Ulysse Malassagne and Erika Forzy, Shareena Carlson, Darrick Bachman, and David Krentz (for "Shadow of Fate")	Nominated	
Saturn Awards	2021	Best Animated Series on Television	Primal	Nominated	
