= Robert Alvarez =

American animator and writer

- Born: Robert James Alvarez; Brooklyn, New York, U.S.
- Education: California Institute of the Arts
- Occupations: Animator, storyboard artist, animation director, director, writer
- Years active: 1968–2023
- Awards: 6 Primetime Emmy Awards

Robert James Alvarez is an American retired animator, storyboard artist, television director, and writer. Alvarez studied at the Chouinard Art Institute, which later became the California Institute of the Arts, graduating in 1971. He began his career as an assistant animator for the 1968 film Yellow Submarine.

Throughout his five decades in the animation industry, Alvarez developed an extensive resume. He worked on hundreds of productions, mainly for television. He is best known for his work on multiple shows at Hanna-Barbera and Cartoon Network Studios, and has also worked at other animation studios, such as Disney Television Animation, Nickelodeon, Frederator Studios, and Warner Bros. Animation. His studio credits include, in chronological order, Scooby-Doo, The Smurfs, The Jetsons, G.I. Joe, Teenage Mutant Ninja Turtles, DuckTales, SWAT Kats: The Radical Squadron, Animaniacs, Dexter's Laboratory, The Powerpuff Girls, Samurai Jack, Ben 10, Regular Show, and Adventure Time. He has been awarded six Primetime Emmy Awards and a total of 25 Emmy nominations for his achievements.

== Career ==
Alvarez began his career as an assistant animator for the 1968 film Yellow Submarine starring The Beatles. Since then, he has worked on many animated television series, including Super Friends, The Smurfs, G.I. Joe: A Real American Hero, A Pup Named Scooby-Doo, SWAT Kats: The Radical Squadron, Dexter's Laboratory, Cow and Chicken, I Am Weasel, The Grim Adventures of Billy & Mandy, The New Adventures of Winnie the Pooh and Regular Show. He also created and wrote two animated pilots, Pizza Boy in "No Tip" and Tumbleweed Tex in "School Daze", for Hanna-Barbera's cartoon shorts showcase What a Cartoon! in 1996.

== Accolades ==
Alvarez has received 6 Primetime Emmy Awards, 9 Primetime Emmy Award nominations, and 1 Daytime Emmy Award nomination. His first nomination came in 1994 in the category Outstanding Animated Program (for Programming One Hour or Less) for directing The Town Santa Forgot. In 2000 and 2001, he received two more nominations for his work on The Powerpuff Girls, also receiving one in 2004 for The Powerpuff Girls special "'Twas the Fight Before Christmas". Alvarez won two Primetime Emmys for his work on the Genndy Tartakovsky series Star Wars: Clone Wars and a third for Samurai Jack. In 2006, he garnered one nomination for Foster's Home for Imaginary Friends and another for the My Life as a Teenage Robot special Escape from Cluster Prime. One more Foster's nomination followed in 2007 for the episode "Good Wilt Hunting" before he would win a Primetime Emmy for the show, which was for the special Destination: Imagination in 2009. In 2010, he was nominated for the animated short Uncle Grandpa in the category Outstanding Short-format Animated Program. Alvarez received a Primetime Emmy award for Regular Show in 2012, which he also was nominated for in 2011. His Daytime Emmy nomination was in 2007 for The Grim Adventures of Billy & Mandy in the category Outstanding Broadband Program — Children's.

== Personal life ==
Alvarez attended Notre Dame High School in Sherman Oaks, California, from 1962 to 1966. He has a Bachelor of Fine Arts degree in animation from the Chouinard Art Institute (now the California Institute of the Arts), which he completed in 1971.

Alvarez retired in August 2023 "due to the changing animation industry and health issues."

== Filmography ==
=== Television ===
| Year | Title | Notes |
|---|---|---|
| 1968 | The Banana Splits | in-betweener |
| 1969 | Winky Dink and You | background artist |
| 1978 | Challenge of the Superfriends | animator |
| 1978 | Galaxy Goof-Ups | animator |
| 1978 | Yogi's Space Race | animator |
| 1979 | Casper and the Angels | animator |
| 1979 | The New Shmoo | animator |
| 1979 | The Super Globetrotters | animator/layout artist |
| 1979 | Scooby-Doo and Scrappy-Doo | animator |
| 1980 | The Flintstone Comedy Show | animator |
| 1980 | The World's Greatest SuperFriends | animator |
| 1980–1981 | The Fonz and the Happy Days Gang | animator |
| 1981 | Super Friends | animator |
| 1981 | Trollkins | animator |
| 1981–1988 | The Smurfs | animator/animation director |
| 1982 | Pac-Man | animator |
| 1983 | The Christmas Tree Train | lead animator |
| 1983 | He-Man and the Masters of the Universe | animator |
| 1983 | The New Scooby and Scrappy-Doo Show | animator |
| 1983 | The Smurfs Christmas Special | animator |
| 1984 | Pole Position | sheet timer |
| 1984 | Snorks | animation director |
| 1985 | Galtar and the Golden Lance | animation director |
| 1985 | The Jetsons | animator |
| 1985 | Kidd Video | sheet timer |
| 1985 | Pound Puppies | animation director |
| 1985 | Rainbow Brite | sheet timer |
| 1985 | Robotman & Friends | sheet timer |
| 1985 | The Turkey Caper | animator |
| 1985 | Yogi's Treasure Hunt | animation director |
| 1985 | The 13 Ghosts of Scooby-Doo | animator |
| 1985–1986 | Hulk Hogan's Rock 'n' Wrestling | sheet timer |
| 1985–1986 | Paw Paws | animator |
| 1986 | Ghostbusters | animator |
| 1986 | G.I. Joe: A Real American Hero | sequence director |
| 1986–1987 | She-Ra: Princess of Power | animator |
| 1986–1989 | The Greatest Adventure: Stories from the Bible | animator |
| 1987 | The Little Clowns of Happytown | sequence director |
| 1987 | Teenage Mutant Ninja Turtles | sequence director |
| 1987 | Visionaries: Knights of the Magical Light | sheet timer |
| 1987–1988 | BraveStarr | animator |
| 1988 | The Completely Mental Misadventures of Ed Grimley | animation director |
| 1988 | Denver, the Last Dinosaur | sheet timer |
| 1988 | Dino-Riders | animation director |
| 1988 | The Flintstone Kids' "Just Say No" Special | animation director |
| 1988 | Gumby Adventures | animation director |
| 1988 | The New Yogi Bear Show | animation director |
| 1988 | A Pup Named Scooby-Doo | animation director |
| 1989 | Camp Candy | animation timer/storyboard timer |
| 1989 | Dixie's Diner | animation director |
| 1989 | The Further Adventures of SuperTed | animation director |
| 1989 | Vytor: The Starfire Champion | sheet timer |
| 1989–1990 | DuckTales | timing director |
| 1989–1990 | The New Adventures of Winnie the Pooh | timing director |
| 1990 | Adventures of the Gummi Bears | animation director |
| 1990 | Gravedale High | animation director |
| 1990 | Midnight Patrol: Adventures in the Dream Zone | animation director |
| 1990 | Bill & Ted's Excellent Adventures | animation director |
| 1990 | Tom & Jerry Kids | animation director |
| 1990–1991 | The Adventures of Don Coyote and Sancho Panda | animation director |
| 1990–1991 | Timeless Tales from Hallmark | animation director |
| 1991 | The Pirates of Dark Water | animation director |
| 1992 | The Addams Family | animation director |
| 1992–1995 | Capitol Critters | animation director |
| 1993 | The Addams Family | animation director |
| 1993 | Droopy, Master Detective | animation director |
| 1993 | 2 Stupid Dogs | animation director |
| 1993–1994 | Captain Planet and the Planeteers | animation director |
| 1993–1995 | SWAT Kats: The Radical Squadron | animation director |
| 1995 | Dumb and Dumber | animation director |
| 1995–1997 | What a Cartoon! | animation director |
| 1995–1996 | The Twisted Tales of Felix the Cat | animation director |
| 1996 | Animaniacs | sheet timer/slugging |
| 1996 | Pinky and the Brain | sheet timer |
| 1996–2003 | Dexter's Laboratory | animation director |
| 1996–1997 | The Real Adventures of Jonny Quest | animation timer |
| 1996–2000 | The Sylvester & Tweety Mysteries | timing director |
| 1997–2004 | Johnny Bravo | animation director |
| 1998–1999 | Cow and Chicken | |
| 1998–1999 | Histeria! | sheet timing |
| 1998–1999 | I Am Weasel | animation director |
| 1998–2004 | The Powerpuff Girls | animation director |
| 2000–2001 | Cartoon Cartoon Fridays | animation director |
| 2000–2001 | The Grim Adventures of Billy & Mandy | animation director |
| 2001–2017 | Samurai Jack | animation director/sheet timer |
| 2001 | Ferret and Parrot | sheet timer |
| 2001 | IMP, Inc. | sheet timer |
| 2002–2006 | My Life as a Teenage Robot | sheet timer |
| 2002 | Whatever Happened to... Robot Jones? | sheet timer |
| 2002–2003 | Harvey Birdman, Attorney at Law | director |
| 2002–2007 | Codename: Kids Next Door | timing director |
| 2001–2003 | Evil Con Carne | animation director |
| 2003–2005 | Alex Adventure | sheet timer |
| 2003–2005 | Star Wars: Clone Wars | sheet timer |
| 2004–2009 | Foster's Home for Imaginary Friends | animation director |
| 2005 | Robotboy | sheet timer |
| 2006 | Korgoth of Barbaria | sheet timer |
| 2006 | Ben 10 | sheet timer |
| 2006 | Legion of Super Heroes | sheet timer |
| 2006–2008 | My Gym Partner's a Monkey | sheet timer |
| 2007 | The Grim Adventures of the KND | sheet timer |
| 2007 | Random! Cartoons | sheet timer |
| 2008 | Underfist: Halloween Bash | sheet timer |
| 2008 | The Powerpuff Girls Rule!!! | sheet timer |
| 2008–2009 | Chowder | animation director/sheet timer |
| 2008–2010 | The Marvelous Misadventures of Flapjack | sheet timer |
| 2009 | Ben 10: Alien Force | sheet timer |
| 2010–2011 | The Mighty B! | sheet timer |
| 2010–2013 | Generator Rex | supervising animation director |
| 2009–2017 | Regular Show | animation director |
| 2010–2011 | Sym-Bionic Titan | animation director/sheet timer |
| 2011–2012 | Secret Mountain Fort Awesome | animation director |
| 2012–2014 | Ben 10: Omniverse | sheet timer |
| 2013–2017 | Uncle Grandpa | animation director |
| 2013 | OK K.O.! Let's Be Heroes | timing director (pilot only) |
| 2013 | Paranormal Roommates | timing director |
| 2013–2014 | Over the Garden Wall | timing director |
| 2014 | AJ's Infinite Summer | timing director |
| 2014 | Back to Backspace | timing director |
| 2014 | Clarence | timing director |
| 2014 | The Team Unicorn Saturday Action Fun Hour! | timing director |
| 2014–2015 | Mixels | timing director |
| 2015–2019 | We Bare Bears | animation director |
| 2015 | Long Live the Royals | timing director |
| 2015 | Ridin' with Burgess | timing director |
| 2015 | Twelve Forever | timing director (pilot only) |
| 2016–2018 | The Powerpuff Girls | animation director |
| 2016 | Bottom's Butte | animation director |
| 2016 | Victor and Valentino | animation director (pilot only) |
| 2017 | Craig of the Creek | animation director (pilot only) |
| 2017 | Summer Camp Island | animation director (pilot only) |
| 2017 | Tiggle Winks | animation director |
| 2018 | Adventure Time | sheet timer |
| 2019 | Infinity Train | supervising animation director |

=== Film ===
| Year | Title | Notes |
|---|---|---|
| 1968 | Yellow Submarine | assistant animator |
| 1985 | Creature | animator |
| 1987 | Pinocchio and the Emperor of the Night | animator |
| 1989 | Little Nemo: Adventures in Slumberland | sheet timer |
| 1990 | Jetsons: The Movie | animator |
| 1990 | DuckTales the Movie: Treasure of the Lost Lamp | slugging and timing director |
| 1993 | I Yabba-Dabba Do! | animation director |
| 1993 | The Halloween Tree | animation director |
| 1993 | The Town Santa Forgot | director/animation director |
| 1994 | Yogi the Easter Bear | director/animation director |
| 1995 | Gumby: The Movie | sheet timer |
| 1998 | Scooby-Doo on Zombie Island | animation director |
| 2000 | Scooby-Doo and the Alien Invaders | animation timing director |
| 2000 | Tweety's High-Flying Adventure | timing director |
| 2001 | Scooby-Doo and the Cyber Chase | animation timing director |
| 2001 | The Flintstones: On the Rocks | animation director |
| 2002 | The Adventures of Tom Thumb & Thumbelina | animation director (uncredited) |
| 2002 | The Powerpuff Girls Movie | additional animation direction |
| 2002 | Tom and Jerry: The Magic Ring | animation timing director |
| 2009 | Scooby-Doo! and the Samurai Sword | animation timer |
| 2009 | Green Lantern: First Flight | animation timer |
| 2015 | Regular Show: The Movie | animation director |
