= Keith Crofford =

American television executive

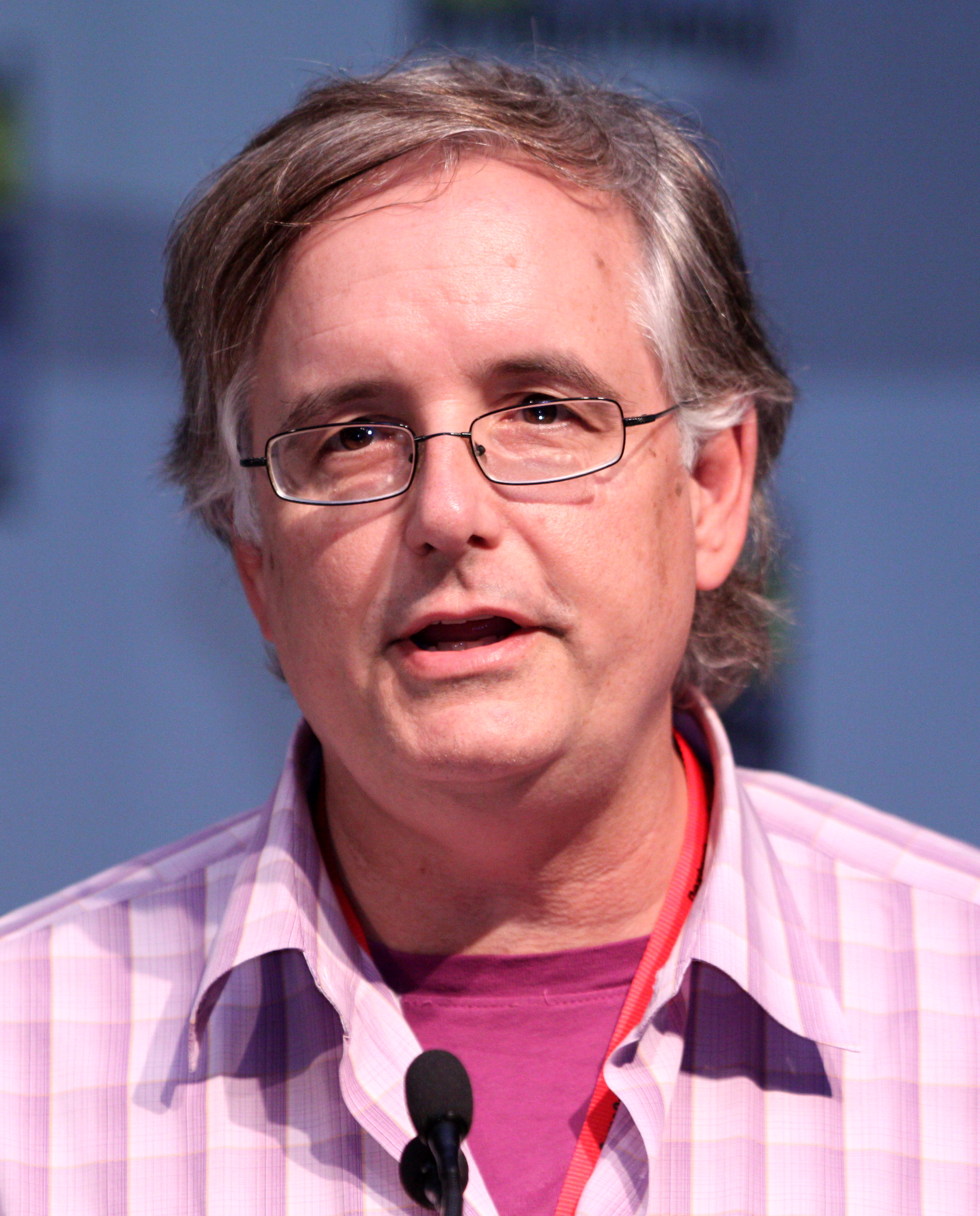
- Crofford at the 2010 San Diego Comic-Con
- Born: April 14, 1956 (age 70); Tuscaloosa, Alabama, U.S.
- Education: Florida State University, Class of 1978
- Occupations: Television producer, voice actor
- Years active: 1996–2020
- Known for: Space Ghost Coast to Coast

Keith Crofford (born April 14, 1956) is the former executive vice president of production for Adult Swim, the adult-oriented division of Cartoon Network, and general manager of Williams Street. He was executive producer for several Williams Street in-house productions such as Space Ghost Coast to Coast, Aqua Teen Hunger Force, The Brak Show and Squidbillies. He also served as the executive producer for Williams Street out-of-house productions such as Sealab 2021, Robot Chicken, Tom Goes to the Mayor, Minoriteam and Moral Orel. Crofford was also the executive in charge of production for Adult Swim's The Venture Bros. More recently, he has worked on the Adult Swim animated production Primal; for his work on the episode "Plague of Madness", he was listed as a recipient of the Emmy Award for Outstanding Animated Program.

Crofford was born in Tuscaloosa, Alabama, and attended Florida State University from 1974 to 1978.

In 1996, Crofford voiced MOE 2000, an unfeeling computer director, in an episode, "$20.01", of Space Ghost Coast to Coast on Cartoon Network. He also voiced himself in Robot Chicken four times from 2005 to 2008 on Adult Swim.

In December 2020, Crofford retired from the company.
