= David Krentz =

American paleoartist and animator

- Education: California Institute of the Arts
- Known for: Paleoart, Marvel films, Disney films, animation, storyboards, directing and character design
- Website: www.davidkrentz.com

David Krentz is a Canadian-American paleoartist, character designer, animator, storyboard artist, writer and director specializing in dinosaurs. Krentz was born in Winnipeg, Manitoba in 1969. As an animator for Walt Disney Pictures, Krentz has worked on Disney animated feature titles such as Fantasia 2000, Disney's Dinosaur, Treasure Planet, and John Carter, as well as productions for other studios such as Escape from Planet Earth. He has also contributed character designs and computer-generated models for films such as the 2013 BBC reboot of Walking with Dinosaurs, including close to 20 ZBrush models.

In addition to his work on films, Krentz has contributed his character design expertise to television shows such as the Discovery Channel's four-part nature documentary Dinosaur Revolution and its feature film version, Dinotasia, which was created from unused sequences of the show. Krentz was also the co-director and art director for both of these productions. More recently, he has worked as a writer and storyboard artist for the Adult Swim animated production Primal. For his work as a storyboard artist on the episode "Plague of Madness", he has won two Emmys for Outstanding Individual Achievement in Animation. For the same episode, he was also listed as a recipient of the award for Outstanding Animated Program.

His 3D modeling of dinosaurs was preceded by his paleoart, in which he has an avocational interest in sculpting of dinosaurs.
