= Claudia Katz =

American animation producer

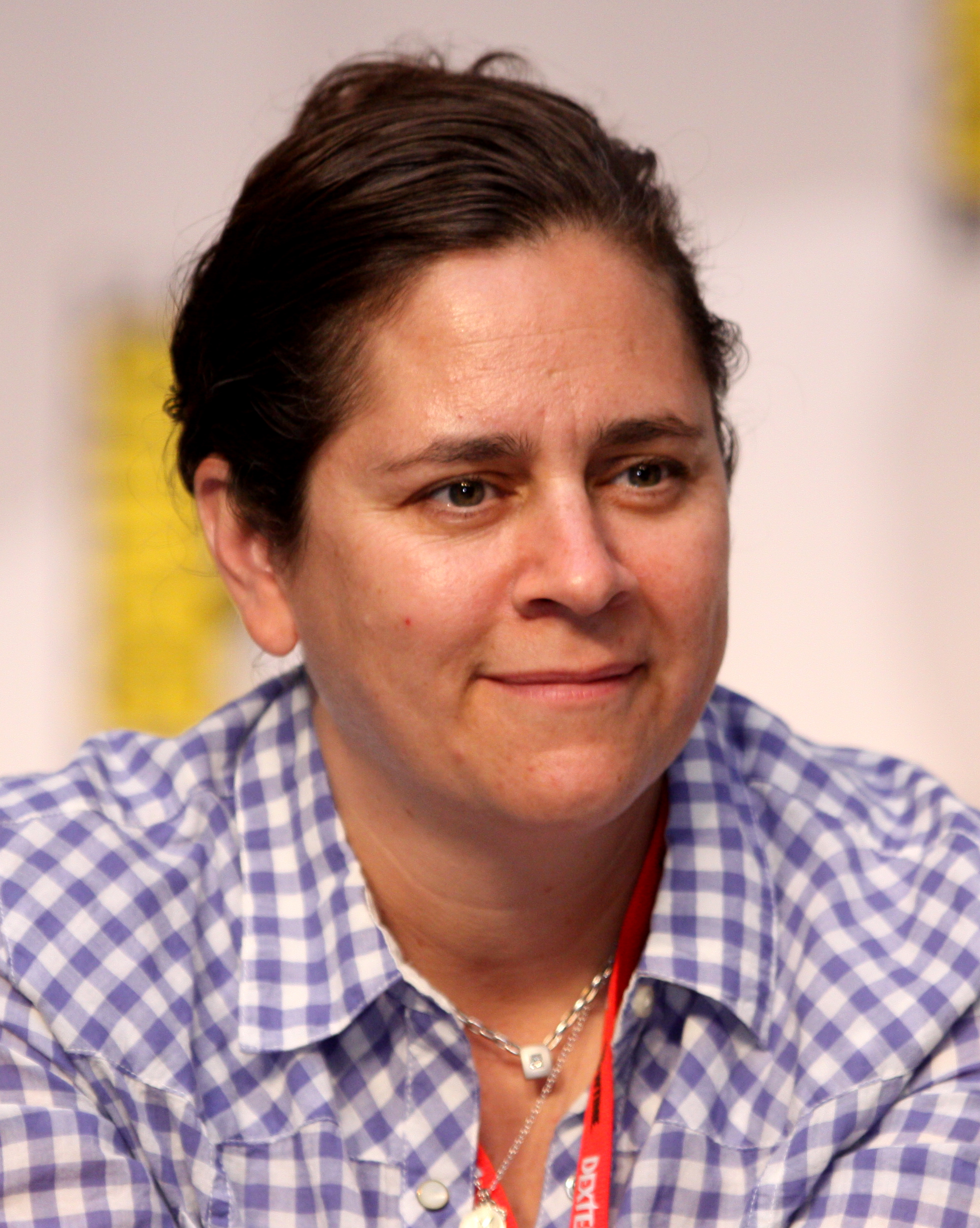
- Katz at the 2010 Comic Con in San Diego.
- Born: New York City, New York
- Occupation: Animation producer
- Years active: 1994-present
- Spouse: Scott Vanzo

Claudia Katz is an American animation producer. Katz is a partner and Executive Vice President of Rough Draft Studios.

== Life ==
Katz is a graduate of Franklin & Marshall College Class of 1988. Katz is Jewish.

Katz was a commercial producer at a New York ad agency, when she was introduced to The Simpsons animation team to produce a commercial for Butterfinger candy bar. In 1994, Katz joined Rough Draft Studios to produce numerous projects for film and television including The Maxx, Futurama and Drawn Together. Claudia has received Emmy and Hugo Awards for her work on Futurama.
