= Home media =

Home media refers to media used for recording, copying, delivery, and playback of various types of entertainment and information in the home.

Forms of home media include:

- Home audio
- Home video
- Magnetic tape
- Phonograph record
- Home computer programmes and video games

== See also ==
- Home Media Magazine, a former trade publication that covered various aspects of the home entertainment industry
