= Genndy Tartakovsky =

Russian-born American animator (born 1970)

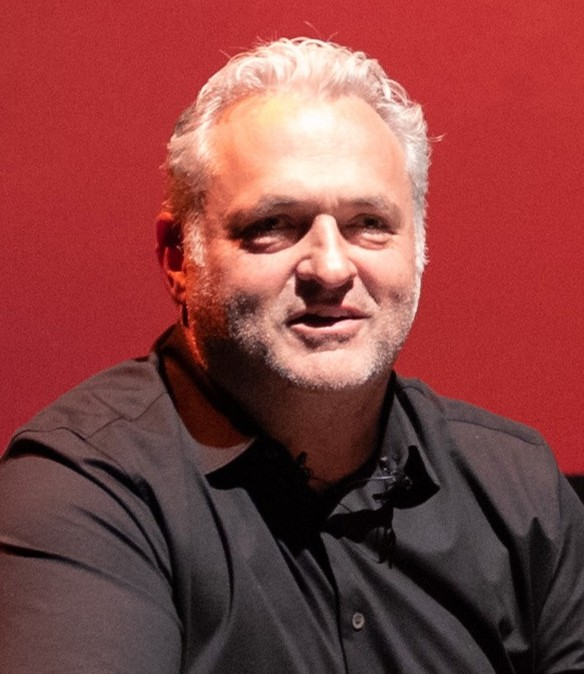
- Tartakovsky at the Annecy International Animation Film Festival in 2023
- Born: Gennady Borisovich Tartakovsky; January 17, 1970 (age 56); Moscow, Russian SFSR, Soviet Union
- Education: California Institute of the Arts (BFA)
- Occupations: Animator; writer; producer; director; voice actor; storyboard artist
- Years active: 1988–present
- Employer(s): Hanna-Barbera (1993–1995); Cartoon Network Studios (1996–present); Sony Pictures Animation (2011–2015, 2017–present)
- Known for: Dexter's Laboratory; Samurai Jack; The Powerpuff Girls; Star Wars: Clone Wars; Sym-Bionic Titan; Hotel Transylvania; Primal; Unicorn: Warriors Eternal; Fixed
- Spouse: Dawn David (m. 2000)
- Children: 3

Gennady Borisovich "Genndy" Tartakovsky (Note: Russian: Геннадий Борисович Тартаковский) (Note: Although his Russian name Геннадий is normally transliterated as Gennady or Gennadiy, he shortened its spelling to Genndy after moving to the U.S.) (/ˈɡɛndi ˌtɑːrtəˈkɒfski/; born January 17, 1970) is a Russian-American animator, screenwriter, film producer, and director. He is best known as the creator of Dexter's Laboratory, and has also developed Samurai Jack, Star Wars: Clone Wars, Sym-Bionic Titan, and Unicorn: Warriors Eternal for Cartoon Network. He is also known for creating the Adult Swim series Primal, directing the first three films and writing the fourth film in the Hotel Transylvania series for Sony Pictures Animation, and directing the studio’s first adult animated film Fixed.

Tartakovsky is widely considered to be among the most influential artists and storytellers in the history of animation. Much of his work is well known for its unique animation, visual spectacle, and distinctive narrative style, including fast-paced action, meditative adventures, physical comedy and slapstick, elements of horror and romance, minimal dialogue, and genre-blending (e.g., science fantasy). Throughout his career, Tartakovsky has won five Emmy Awards, three Annie Awards, a World Animation Conference Award, an OIAF Award, and the Winsor McCay Award, among other nominations for his works. According to Animation World Network, "the name 'Genndy Tartakovsky' carries considerable cultural weight...[he's] helped shape some of animation's most memorable and impactful series".

== Early life ==
Tartakovsky was born on January 17, 1970, in Moscow to Jewish parents. His father worked as a dentist for government officials and the Soviet Union national ice hockey team. Tartakovsky felt that his father was a very strict and old-fashioned man, but they had a close relationship. His mother, Miriam, was an assistant principal at a school. He has a brother, Alexander, who is two years older and a computer consultant in Chicago. Before coming to the United States, his family moved to Italy. There, Tartakovsky was first drawn to art, inspired by a neighbor's daughter. Tartakovsky later commented, "I remember, I was horrible at it. For the life of me, I couldn't draw a circle".

Kids watching too much TV is not a problem in Russia. There's nothing for them to watch. I came here and got sucked into TV right away. 'Wonder Woman', 'Batman' and the cartoons from Warner Brothers and Hanna Barbera – as soon as I started watching it, I fell in love with cartoon movement.

— Tartakovsky

Tartakovsky's family moved to the United States when he was seven due to concerns about the effect of antisemitism on their children's lives. The family originally settled in Columbus, Ohio and later moved to Chicago. He was greatly influenced by the comics he found there; his first purchase was an issue of Super Friends. Tartakovsky began attending Chicago's Eugene Field Elementary School in the third grade. Since Tartakovsky was a foreigner, he found it hard to fit in and make friends, trying to find ways to assimilate into American culture. He went on to attend Chicago's prestigious Lane Tech College Prep High School and says he did not fit in until his sophomore year, when he joined and befriended teammates on the school's football team. When he was 16, his father died of a heart attack. Afterwards, Tartakovsky and his family moved to government-funded housing, and he began working multiple jobs while still attending high school.

To satisfy his ambitious family, who were encouraging him to be a businessman, Tartakovsky tried to take an advertising class, but signed up late and thereby had little choice over his classes. He was assigned to take an animation class and this led to his study of film at Columbia College Chicago before moving to Los Angeles to study animation at the California Institute of the Arts with his friend Rob Renzetti. There he met Craig McCracken. At CalArts, Tartakovsky directed and animated two student films, one of which became the basis for Dexter's Laboratory. After two years at CalArts, Tartakovsky got a job at Lapiz Azul Productions in Spain on Batman: The Animated Series. There, "he learned the trials of TV animation, labor intensive and cranking it out". While he was in Spain, his mother died of cancer.

== Career ==
Craig McCracken acquired an art director job at Hanna-Barbera for the show 2 Stupid Dogs and recommended hiring Rob Renzetti and Tartakovsky, who were all roommates at this time. This was a major turning point in Tartakovsky's career. Hanna-Barbera let Tartakovsky, McCracken, Renzetti and Paul Rudish work in a trailer in the parking lot of the studio, and there Tartakovsky started creating his best-known works. Dexter's Laboratory grew out of a student film with the same title that he produced while at the California Institute of the Arts. Dexter's Lab would become Cartoon Network's first original series, first hit, and its success made Tartakovsky "an architect of the success of the Cartoon Network". Tartakovsky co-wrote and pencilled the 25th issue of the Dexter's Laboratory comic book series, titled "Stubble Trouble", as well as several stories which are collected in the Dexter's Laboratory Classics trade paperback. Additionally, he helped produce The Powerpuff Girls, co-directed several episodes and served as the animation director and a cinematographer for The Powerpuff Girls Movie; he co-wrote one of the franchise's comics. Both Dexter's Laboratory and The Powerpuff Girls were nominated repeatedly for Emmy Awards.

Tartakovsky created the action-adventure series Samurai Jack, which premiered in 2001; he also wrote comics for the franchise. The series won him an Emmy in the category of "Outstanding Animated Program (For Programming Less Than One Hour)" in 2004. Star Wars creator George Lucas hired Tartakovsky to direct Star Wars: Clone Wars (2003–2005), an animated series taking place between Attack of the Clones and Revenge of the Sith. The series won three Emmy Awards: two for "Outstanding Animated Program (for Programming One Hour or More)" in 2004 and 2005, and another for "Outstanding Individual Achievement in Animation" (for background designer Justin Thompson in 2005). Tartakovsky was not involved in the 2008 follow-up series.

In 2005, Tartakovsky was appointed creative president of Orphanage Animation Studios. In 2006, he was chosen as the director for a sequel to Jim Henson's The Dark Crystal, but was replaced and the film was later scrapped. Tartakovsky served as animation director on the pilot episode of Aaron Springer's Korgoth of Barbaria, which aired on Adult Swim in 2006 but was not picked up as a series. He also directed a series of anti-smoking advertisements, one for Nicorette in 2006 and two for Niquitin in 2008. In 2009, Tartakovsky created a pilot entitled Maruined for Cartoon Network's The Cartoonstitute program, which was not picked up. Around this time, Tartakovsky unsuccessfully pitched Marvel Studios president Kevin Feige a superhero-themed series similar to Clone Wars. He then did some storyboarding work on Jon Favreau's Iron Man 2 (2010).

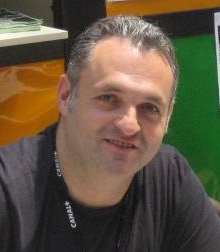
Tartakovsky in 2012 at AIAFF

In 2009, Frederator Studios announced that they had been granted the animated film rights to Samurai Jack from Cartoon Network, who had previously granted the rights to New Line Cinema. Tartakovsky would be "intimately involved" with the project, which was to be produced by Fred Seibert's Frederator Studios and J. J. Abrams' Bad Robot Productions. In June 2012, Tartakovsky said that he had a story to conclude the series and title character's story, but the project had been shelved after Abrams moved on to direct Star Trek. Tartakovsky co-created a new series for Cartoon Network, Sym-Bionic Titan, which aired between 2010 and 2011. He had hoped to expand on the initial season, but it was not renewed. On April 7, 2011, an animated prologue by Tartakovsky for the horror film Priest premiered online.

In early 2011, Tartakovsky moved to Sony Pictures Animation, where he made his feature film directing debut with Hotel Transylvania (2012). In July 2012, he signed a long-term deal with Sony to develop and direct his own original projects. In June 2012, Sony announced that Tartakovsky was slated to direct an animated Popeye feature. On September 18, 2014, Tartakovsky revealed an "animation test". In March 2015, Tartakovsky announced that despite the well-received test footage, he was no longer working on the project. He moved onto directing an original story, Can You Imagine?, which was announced in 2014, but it, too was cancelled and shelved.

Tartakovsky directed Hotel Transylvania 2, the sequel to Hotel Transylvania, released in 2015. In December 2015, Adult Swim announced that Tartakovsky would return for a final season of Samurai Jack, during which he stepped away from Sony Pictures Animation.

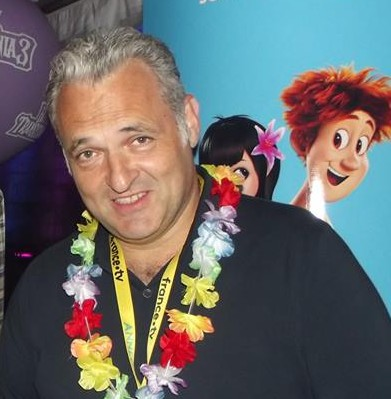
Tartakovsky in 2018 at AIAFF

When the series finished airing in 2017, Tartakovsky returned to Sony and directed Hotel Transylvania 3: Summer Vacation (2018). After its financial success, two original projects were announced: an R-rated comedy called Fixed and an action-adventure film entitled Black Knight.

In May 2019, Adult Swim announced that they had commissioned a new series from Tartakovsky entitled Primal, which is about "a caveman at the dawn of evolution ... [and a] dinosaur on the brink of extinction". It began airing on October 7, 2019.

On May 11, 2020, Animation Magazine announced that Tartakovsky's Popeye project was being revived by King Features Syndicate, with T. J. Fixman writing the script. Tartakovsky later clarified that he was not working on it yet and funding was still needed, saying that if he had the time he would do it. In mid-2022, an animatic for the film was leaked online and subsequently taken down.

Tartakovsky was involved in the development of the video game Samurai Jack: Battle Through Time, which was released on August 21, 2020. On October 28, a new series by him called Unicorn: Warriors Eternal was announced; it focuses on a group of teen heroes, drawing inspiration from world mythology, and has been billed as all-ages animation. It was produced by Cartoon Network Studios and aired on Cartoon Network and HBO Max as part of an attempt by WarnerMedia to reach a broader range of the "older kid and tween market." This was confirmed in a February 2021 announcement which mentioned the series. Tartakovsky described the project as an "extension of everything that I've done from Dexter to Powerpuff to Samurai Jack. It's all those ideas that we practiced, that sometimes were successful, sometimes not as much".

On June 15, 2022, Tartakovsky signed a cross-studio overall deal with Cartoon Network Studios and Warner Bros. Animation that lets him develop, create and produce animated programs for a variety of platforms, either with original characters or with a Warner Bros. Discovery IP. Sam Register, president of both companies, said "Genndy is a true visionary who embodies the creator spirit of Cartoon Network Studios. As he continues to push the boundaries of storytelling and animation, we are excited to have a front row seat both here and now also at Warner Bros. Animation."

On March 30, 2023, Deadline Hollywood announced that Tartakovsky's show Unicorn: Warriors Eternal was moved to Adult Swim, which premiered on the programming block on May 1, 2023. On April 25, 2023, he stated that he had no intention of developing a Dexter's Laboratory reboot after the death of Christine Cavanaugh, the original voice of Dexter and due to the "oversaturation" of recent reboots of cartoons.

In April 2025, Netflix announced their acquisition of Tartakovsky's adult animated film Fixed, which is produced by Sony Pictures Animation.

After pitching the animated series for nearly 20 years, Tartakovsky's Conan the Barbarian was picked up by Amazon Prime and is produced by Cartoon Network Studios.

== Legacy ==
Tartakovsky has often been hailed as an influence on various animators, illustrators, cartoonists, authors, filmmakers and writers especially across North America and Europe, including McCracken, Rudish, Renzetti, Favreau, Amphibia creator Matt Braly, Pixar artist Sanjay Patel, Final Space creator and YouTuber Olan Rogers, and Tomm Moore of Ireland's Cartoon Saloon, with the latter commending the way Tartakovsky's Samurai Jack "created a cinematic look on a TV budget".

== Personal life ==
In 2000, Tartakovsky married Dawn David. As of 2017, he has three children. He is fluent in English and speaks some Russian. His top creative inspirations include Tex Avery, Bob Clampett, Chuck Jones, George Lucas, David Lean, Mel Brooks, Max Fleischer, Osamu Tezuka, Jack Kirby, Walt Disney, Steven Spielberg, Akira Kurosawa, Alfred Hitchcock, Stanley Kubrick, Hayao Miyazaki, Sergio Leone, Frank Miller, Francis Ford Coppola, Robert E. Howard, Ridley Scott, Mel Gibson, and Harvey Kurtzman as well as Disney's Nine Old Men and Hanna-Barbera; he admires the likes of Wes Anderson, John Hughes, James Baxter, Don Bluth, Antonio Prohías, Aaron Blaise, Mamoru Oshii, Matt Groening, Pendleton Ward, Bill Watterson, Frank Frazetta, Ralph Bakshi, Rebecca Sugar, J.G. Quintel, Jorge R. Gutierrez, and Katsuhiro Otomo.

== Filmography ==
=== Television ===
Year	Title	Director	Writer	Producer	Creator	Storyboard artist	Recording director	Other roles	Notes
1993–95	2 Stupid Dogs	Yes	No	No	No	Yes	No	Animation director	Directed episode "Jerk"
1996–99, 2003	Dexter's Laboratory	Yes	Yes	Yes	Yes	Yes	Yes	Character designer	Director (1996–1999, 2003), producer (1996–1999), executive producer (2001–2003)
1998–2002	The Powerpuff Girls	Yes	Yes	Yes	No	Yes	Yes		Director (seasons 1–3), Supervising producer (seasons 1–4)
1999	Dexter's Laboratory: Ego Trip	Yes	Yes	No	No	No	No		TV movie
2001	The Flintstones: On the Rocks	No	No	Supervising	No	No	No		TV movie
2001–04, 2017	Samurai Jack	Yes	Yes	Yes	Yes	Yes	Yes	Sheet timer	
2003–05	Star Wars: Clone Wars	Yes	Yes	Yes	Developer	No	No		
2004	Periwinkle Around the World	Yes	No	Yes	No	No	No	Sheets	Pilot
2010–11	Sym-Bionic Titan	Yes	Yes	Yes	Yes	Yes	Yes		
2019–present	Primal	Yes	Yes	Yes	Yes	Yes	Yes		
2023	Unicorn: Warriors Eternal	Yes	Yes	Yes	Yes	Yes	Yes		
2027	Motel Transylvania	No	No	Executive	No	No	No		
TBA	Heist Brothers	No	No	No	Yes	No	No		
TBA	Conan the Barbarian	Yes	No	Yes	No	No	No		

Other roles

Year	Title	Notes
1991	Tiny Toon Adventures "Henny Youngman Day"	Assistant animator (uncredited)
1992–93	Batman: The Animated Series	Inbetween artist (uncredited)
1994	The Critic	Animation timer
1998	Cow and Chicken "Cow's Pies"	Story and storyboard artist
1999	Uncle Gus in: For the Love of Monkeys	Supervising producer
2000	Foe Paws	Animation director, animation layout, and supervising producer
2000	The Grim Adventures of Billy & Mandy "Pilot"	Supervising producer
2000	Whatever Happened to... Robot Jones? "Pilot"	Supervising producer
2003	Duck Dodgers "Samurai Quack"	Voice actor as himself
2006	Korgoth of Barbaria "Pilot"	Animation director
2013	Steven Universe "Pilot"	Timing director

=== Feature film ===
Year	Title	Director	Writer	Producer	Notes
2011	Priest	Uncredited	No	No	Animated prologue
2012	Hotel Transylvania	Yes	No	No	
2015	Hotel Transylvania 2	Yes	No	No	
2018	Hotel Transylvania 3: Summer Vacation	Yes	Yes	No	Voice actor of Blobby, Blobby Baby, and Puppy Blobby
2022	Hotel Transylvania: Transformania	No	Yes	Executive	Voice actor of Blobby
2025	Fixed	Yes	Yes	Yes	
2027	The Haunting of Hotel Transylvania	No	No	Executive	
TBA	Black Knight	Yes	Yes	No	

Other roles

Year	Title	Role	Notes
2002	The Powerpuff Girls Movie	Animation director	
2006	How to Eat Fried Worms	Animation supervisor	
2010	Iron Man 2	Storyboard artist	Uncredited
2016	Trolls	Creative consultant	Uncredited

=== Short film ===
Year	Title	Director	Writer	Notes
2008	Maruined	No	Creator	Pilot for The Cartoonstitute
2012	Goodnight Mr. Foot	Yes	Yes	Also animator
2017	Puppy!	Yes	Yes	

== Bibliography ==
Year	Title	Publisher	Notes
1999	Dexter's Laboratory: "Comic Relief"	DC Comics	Writer, illustrator
2001	Dexter's Laboratory: "Stubble Trouble"	DC Comics	Writer, illustrator
2016	Cage!	Marvel Comics	Writer, illustrator

== Awards and nominations ==
Year	Award	Category	Work	Result
1995	Annie Awards	Best Animated Short Subject	Dexter's Laboratory	Won
1995	Annie Awards	Best Individual Achievement for Storyboarding in the Field of Animation	Dexter's Laboratory	Nominated
1995	Primetime Emmy Awards	Outstanding Animated Program (for Programming One Hour or Less)	Dexter's Laboratory	Nominated
1996	Primetime Emmy Awards	Outstanding Animated Program (for Programming One Hour or Less)	Dexter's Laboratory "The Big Sister"	Nominated
1997	Primetime Emmy Awards	Outstanding Animated Program (for Programming One Hour or Less)	Dexter's Laboratory "Star-Spangled Sidekicks", "TV Super Pals", and "Game Over"	Nominated
1997	Annie Awards	Best Animated TV Program	Dexter's Laboratory	Nominated
1997	Annie Awards	Best Individual Achievement: Producing in a TV Production	Dexter's Laboratory "Ham Hocks and Arm Locks"	Nominated
1998	Annie Awards	Outstanding Achievement in an Animated Primetime or Late Night Television Program	Dexter's Laboratory	Nominated
1998	Primetime Emmy Awards	Outstanding Animated Program (for Programming One Hour or Less)	Dexter's Laboratory "Dyno-might" and "LABretto"	Nominated
1999	Primetime Emmy Awards	Outstanding Animated Program (for Programming One Hour or Less)	The Powerpuff Girls "Bubblevicious" and "The Bare Facts"	Nominated
2000	Annie Awards	Outstanding Achievement in a Primetime or Late Night Animated Television Program	Dexter's Laboratory	Nominated
2000	Primetime Emmy Awards	Outstanding Animated Program (for Programming One Hour or Less)	The Powerpuff Girls "Beat Your Greens" and "Down 'n Dirty"	Nominated
2001	Primetime Emmy Awards	Outstanding Animated Program (for Programming One Hour or Less)	The Powerpuff Girls "Moral Decay" and "Meet the Beat Alls"	Nominated
2001	WAC Winner	Best Television Special	Dexter's Laboratory: Ego Trip	Won
2002	Primetime Emmy Awards	Outstanding Animated Program (for Programming One Hour Or More)	Samurai Jack; I–III – "The Beginning"	Nominated
2002	OIAF Award	Best Television Series	Samurai Jack; VII – "Jack and the Three Blind Archers"	Won
2004	Annie Awards	Outstanding Directing in an Animated Television Production	Samurai Jack; XXXVII–XXXVIII – "The Birth of Evil"	Nominated
2004	Primetime Emmy Awards	Outstanding Animated Program (for Programming One Hour or Less)	Samurai Jack; XXXVII–XXXVIII – "The Birth of Evil"	Won
2004	Primetime Emmy Awards	Outstanding Animated Program (for Programming One Hour or More)	Star Wars: Clone Wars; Vol. 1 (chapters 1–20)	Won
2004	Saturn Awards	Best Television Presentation in the Academy of Science Fiction, Fantasy & Horror Films, USA	Star Wars: Clone Wars	Nominated
2005	Annie Awards	Directing in an Animated Television Production	Samurai Jack; L - "Tale of X-49"	Nominated
2005	Primetime Emmy Awards	Outstanding Animated Program (for Programming One Hour or More)	Star Wars: Clone Wars; Vol. 2 (chapters 21–25)	Won
2005	Primetime Emmy Awards	Outstanding Animated Program (for Programming One Hour or Less)	Samurai Jack; XLIX – "Seasons of Death"	Nominated
2006	Annie Awards	Best Animated TV Program	Star Wars: Clone Wars; Vol. 2 (chapters 21–25)	Won
2007	Winsor McCay Award			Won
2013	Golden Globe Awards	Best Animated Feature	Hotel Transylvania	Nominated
2013	Annie Awards	Directing in an Animated Feature Production	Hotel Transylvania	Nominated
2013	VES Award	Outstanding Animation in an Animated Feature Motion Picture	Hotel Transylvania	Nominated
2016	Annie Awards	Directing in an Animated Feature Production	Hotel Transylvania 2	Nominated
2018	Annie Awards	Directing in an Animated Feature Production	Hotel Transylvania 3: Summer Vacation	Nominated
2020	Emmy Award	Outstanding Individual Achievement in Animation	Primal "Spear and Fang"	Won
2021	Annie Awards	Outstanding Achievement for Directing in an Animated Television/Broadcast Production	Primal "Plague of Madness"	Won
2021	Emmy Award	Outstanding Animated Program	Primal "Plague of Madness"	Won
