= List of Dexter's Laboratory episodes =

Poster for the Dexter's Laboratory pilot on World Premiere Toons.

Dexter's Laboratory is an American animated television series created by Genndy Tartakovsky for Cartoon Network. Initially debuting on February 26, 1995, as a seven-minute World Premiere Toons pilot, it was expanded into a full series after gaining network approval. The first season, which consists of 13 episodes divided into three segments each, premiered on TNT on April 27, 1996, and on TBS and Cartoon Network the following day. A second season that consists of 39 episodes premiered in July 1997. "Last But Not Beast", the second-season finale, was originally supposed to conclude the series in June 1998. However, Tartakovsky directed a television movie titled Dexter's Laboratory: Ego Trip which aired on Cartoon Network on December 10, 1999. He left the series after the movie, focusing on his other projects, Samurai Jack and Star Wars: Clone Wars.

Production on a third season began in 2000 with Chris Savino taking over as creative director and later producer. The third season, consisting of 13 episodes, premiered worldwide on November 18, 2001, during Cartoon Network's "Dexter Goes Global" marathon. A fourth and final season consisting of 13 episodes aired from November 2002 to November 2003. In total, there are 78 episodes and a television movie across 4 seasons.

A previously unaired episode called "Rude Removal" was originally shown only at certain comic conventions that Tartakovsky attended beginning in 1998. The segment, originally produced for season two, was released online by Adult Swim on January 22, 2013.

== Series overview ==
Season	Segments	Episodes	Originally released	
Season	Segments	Episodes	First released	Last released
Pilots	N/A	4	February 26, 1995	April 14, 1996
1	34	13	April 27, 1996	January 1, 1997
2	108	39	July 16, 1997	June 15, 1998
Ego Trip			December 10, 1999	
3	36	13	November 18, 2001	September 20, 2002
4	38	13	November 22, 2002	November 20, 2003

== Episodes ==
=== Pilots (1995–96) ===
No.	Title	Directed by	Storyboard by	Original release date	Prod. code
1	"Dexter's Laboratory" "Changes"	Genndy Tartakovsky	N/A	February 26, 1995	001
1	"Dexter's Laboratory" "Changes"	Genndy Tartakovsky	N/A	May 18, 1996 (rerun)	104c
Dexter and Dee Dee test the former's latest invention: a device that turns people into animals, which yields crazy results.
2	"The Big Sister"	Genndy Tartakovsky	N/A	March 10, 1996	002 HH00615-94012
2	"The Big Sister"	Genndy Tartakovsky	N/A	June 1, 1996 (rerun)	105c
When Dee Dee eats an experimental chocolate chip cookie of Dexter's design, she grows into a giant and makes the city her dollhouse. As she destroys the whole city, Dexter must pilot his giant Robo-Dexo 2000 mecha and return her to normal size.
3	"Old Man Dexter"	Craig McCracken & Genndy Tartakovsky	Craig McCracken	March 24, 1996	003
3	"Old Man Dexter"	Craig McCracken & Genndy Tartakovsky	Craig McCracken	May 11, 1996 (rerun)	101c
After Dexter is banned from watching The Late Early Movie due to his age, he decides to accelerate his age, but Dee Dee tampers with the age acceleration process, causing him to turn into an elderly man. Dexter, mistaken by Dee Dee for her grandfather, falls asleep while watching the show; their mother explains that Dexter is now too old to stay up late.
4	"Dimwit Dexter"	Genndy Tartakovsky	C. Miles Thompson	April 14, 1996	004
4	"Dimwit Dexter"	Genndy Tartakovsky	C. Miles Thompson	May 25, 1996 (rerun)	106c
Dexter cracks due to overworking himself and starts acting idiotic, which makes him the butt of jokes among Dee Dee and the entire neighborhood.

=== Season 1 (1996–97) ===
The first half of the season aired on TNT a day before Cartoon Network and had "Dial M for Monkey" as the middle segment, while the second half aired exclusively on Cartoon Network and had "The Justice Friends" as the middle segment.

The series also switched animation houses from Fil-Cartoons to Rough Draft Korea halfway through the season. Rough Draft would provide animation for the rest of the series.

No. overall	No. in season	Title	Directed by	Storyboard by	Original release date	Prod. code
1a	1a	"DeeDeemensional"	Rob Renzetti & Genndy Tartakovsky	Rob Renzetti	April 27, 1996 (TNT); April 28, 1996 (Cartoon Network)	102a
Dexter falls victim to one of his own inventions and sends Dee Dee back in time to warn his past self about the consequences, but the past Dexter proves hard to convince.
1b	1b	"Dial M for Monkey: Magmanamus"	Paul Rudish & Genndy Tartakovsky	Craig McCracken	April 27, 1996 (TNT); April 28, 1996 (Cartoon Network)	102b
Monkey must defend the city from a giant underground lava monster, Magmanamus (Brad Garrett), who cannot sleep because of the noise created by its residents.
1c	1c	"Maternal Combat"	Rob Renzetti & Genndy Tartakovsky	Rob Renzetti	April 27, 1996 (TNT); April 28, 1996 (Cartoon Network)	102c
When his mother falls ill, Dexter creates a robot to do her chores. Dee Dee gets hold of its remote control and wreaks havoc, forcing Dexter to create a second robot to counter Dee Dee's.
2a	2a	"Dexter Dodgeball"	Craig McCracken & Genndy Tartakovsky	Ricky Nierva	May 4, 1996 (TNT); May 5, 1996 (Cartoon Network)	103a
Dexter is forced to play dodgeball by his substitute P. E. teacher (Michael Pataki). Constantly failing at the hands of three school bullies, Dexter builds a robotic exoskeleton to defend himself.
2b	2b	"Dial M for Monkey: Rasslor"	Paul Rudish & Genndy Tartakovsky	Paul Rudish	May 4, 1996 (TNT); May 5, 1996 (Cartoon Network)	103b
Intergalactic wrestling champion Rasslor ("Macho Man" Randy Savage) challenges Earth's superheroes, including Monkey, with the planet's fate at stake.
2c	2c	"Dexter's Assistant"	Rob Renzetti & Genndy Tartakovsky	Brett Varon & Craig McCracken	May 4, 1996 (TNT); May 5, 1996 (Cartoon Network)	103c
In need of an assistant to operate his latest invention, Dexter performs a brain transplant on Dee Dee to make her smart enough to fulfill the role. With her new brain, Dee Dee proves to be more intelligent than Dexter.
3a	3a	"Dexter's Rival"	Genndy Tartakovsky	Genndy Tartakovsky	May 11, 1996 (TNT); May 12, 1996 (Cartoon Network)	101a
12a	12a	"Dexter's Rival"	Genndy Tartakovsky	Genndy Tartakovsky	December 25, 1996 (rerun)	112a
Mandark Astronomanov (Eddie Deezen), a new student at Dexter's school, seems to be superior to Dexter academically. Mandark compels Dexter to shut down his lab so that Mandark's lab can gain more power. All seems lost for Dexter, until Mandark falls in love with Dee Dee, giving Dexter the means to earn back his reputation and get revenge on Mandark.
3b	3b	"Dial M for Monkey: Simion"	Paul Rudish & Genndy Tartakovsky	Lou Romano	May 11, 1996 (TNT); May 12, 1996 (Cartoon Network)	101b
Monkey encounters Simion (Maurice LaMarche), an intelligent anthropomorphic chimpanzee who seeks vengeance on humans for turning him into his current state.
4a	4a	"Double Trouble"	Rob Renzetti & Genndy Tartakovsky	Butch Hartman	May 18, 1996 (TNT); May 19, 1996 (Cartoon Network)	104a
Dee Dee and her friends, Lee Lee and Mee Mee, enter Dexter's lab and wreak havoc. When Dexter clones himself to stop them, the girls too make clones of themselves.
4b	4b	"Dial M for Monkey: Barbequor"	Paul Rudish & Genndy Tartakovsky	Paul Rudish	May 18, 1996 (TNT); May 19, 1996 (Cartoon Network)	104b
Monkey's birthday party is interrupted by Barbequor (Robert Ridgely), an intergalactic villain who plans to eat the planets, and his sidekick, the Silver Spooner (Rob Paulsen).
5a	5a	"Jurassic Pooch"	Craig McCracken & Genndy Tartakovsky	Butch Hartman & Conrad Vernon	May 25, 1996 (TNT); May 26, 1996 (Cartoon Network)	106a
In order to clone a dinosaur with an incomplete DNA sequence, Dexter uses his dog's genetic code to fill in the gaps. The experiment appears to be a success, but because Dexter filled the gaps with his dog's brain, the cloned dinosaur now behaves like a dog.
5b	5b	"Dial M for Monkey: Orgon Grindor"	Paul Rudish & Genndy Tartakovsky	Lou Romano & Mike Fontanelli	May 25, 1996 (TNT); May 26, 1996 (Cartoon Network)	106b
While on a date with Agent Honeydew, Monkey is hypnotized by the music of the Organ Grindor (Jim Cummings), who commands him to rob Fort Knox.
6a	6a	"Dee Dee's Room"	Genndy Tartakovsky	Teddy Newton & Todd Fredericksen	June 1, 1996 (TNT); June 2, 1996 (Cartoon Network)	105a
After Dee Dee steals his critical invention, Dexter ventures into her room to find it in a homage to Apocalypse Now.
6b	6b	"Dial M for Monkey: Huntor"	Paul Rudish & Genndy Tartakovsky	Paul Rudish	June 1, 1996 (TNT); June 2, 1996 (Cartoon Network)	105b
Monkey encounters Huntor (Ed Gilbert), an extraterrestrial hunter, and must fight him without his powers in order to save Agent Honeydew and Commander Chief.
7a	7a	"Star Spangled Sidekicks"	Genndy Tartakovsky	Genndy Tartakovsky	November 20, 1996	107a
Dexter and Dee Dee enter tryouts to become Major Glory's sidekick. When Dee Dee wins, Dexter realizes that fancy costumes are not the only criterion to become a superhero.
7b	7b	"The Justice Friends: TV Super Pals"	Craig McCracken & Genndy Tartakovsky	Craig McCracken	November 20, 1996	107b
With only one television in their apartment, Major Glory, Valhallen, and Krunk disagree on what to watch: Major Glory wants to watch his televised capture of the Disgruntled Postman, Valhallen wants to watch the monster truck pull, and Krunk wants to watch TV Puppet Pals.
7c	7c	"Game Over"	Craig McCracken & Genndy Tartakovsky	Craig McCracken	November 20, 1996	107c
When Dexter and Dee Dee's father buys his children a video game, Dexter plugs in the cartridge and becomes trapped inside.
8a	8a	"Babysitter Blues"	Craig McCracken & Rob Renzetti	Craig McCracken	November 27, 1996	111a
Dexter has a crush on his teenage babysitter, Lisa. After learning that she has a boyfriend, Dexter sabotages their relationship by accelerating his age by ten years in an attempt to win her heart.
8b	8b	"The Justice Friends: Valhallen's Room"	Genndy Tartakovsky	Paul Rudish & Butch Hartman	November 27, 1996	111b
Valhallen loses his magic axe, which is the source of his superpowers. With no axe, Valhallen transforms into a nerd, forcing Major Glory and Krunk to enter his room to find it.
8c	8c	"Dream Machine"	Rob Renzetti & Genndy Tartakovsky	Don Shank	November 27, 1996	111c
When Dexter's nightmares become frequent and problematic, he invents a machine that allows him to have good dreams, but Dee Dee cannot operate it properly unless she is awake.
9a	9a	"Dollhouse Drama"	Rob Renzetti	Rob Renzetti	December 4, 1996	108a
Suspicious that Dee Dee has not entered his lab on a particular day, Dexter shrinks himself and enters her room to spy on her. Dee Dee takes advantage of Dexter's small size, and he unwillingly becomes a character in Dee Dee's doll story, which he starts to believe to be real.
9b	9b	"The Justice Friends: Krunk's Date"	Genndy Tartakovsky	Butch Hartman	December 4, 1996	108b
While fighting Comrade Red and his gang, Krunk falls in love with his equivalent in their gang, She-Thing.
9c	9c	"The Big Cheese"	Genndy Tartakovsky	Charlie Bean	December 4, 1996	108c
Dexter's new invention allows him to study for the next day's French test during his sleep. A scratched record causes his device to repeat a single phrase, omelette du fromage, throughout the night, and Dexter wakes up with the inability to speak anything besides that phrase.
10a	10a	"Way of the Dee Dee"	Paul Rudish & Genndy Tartakovsky	Paul Rudish	December 11, 1996	110a
Dee Dee teaches Dexter how to live carefree instead of being lonely and purely focused on science.
10b	10b	"The Justice Friends: Say Uncle Sam"	Genndy Tartakovsky	Butch Hartman	December 11, 1996	110b
Major Glory forces Krunk and Valhallen to tidy up their apartment for his Uncle Sam, who is coming over for a visit.
10c	10c	"Tribe Called Girl"	Rob Renzetti & Genndy Tartakovsky	Don Shank	December 11, 1996	110c
To learn more about girls, Dexter camouflages himself to enter Dee Dee's room during a slumber party with her friends Lee Lee and Mee Mee. When he is caught, he is forced to take part in the girls' activities.
11a	11a	"Spacecase"	Rob Renzetti & Genndy Tartakovsky	Ricky Nierva	December 18, 1996	109a
To prevent himself from being abducted by aliens, Dexter tricks Dee Dee into going instead, but he regrets his decision after realizing how much he cares for her.
11b	11b	"The Justice Friends: Ratman"	Genndy Tartakovsky	Charlie Bean	December 18, 1996	109b
To fix their apartment's plumbing, Krunk and Valhallen venture to the basement, where they are met by Ratman (Maurice LaMarche), a diminutive vigilante raised by rats (a parody of Batman).
11c	11c	"Dexter's Debt"	Genndy Tartakovsky	Charlie Bean	December 18, 1996	109c
Dexter's laboratory is threatened with repossession unless he can repay his $200 million debt to NASA. When Dee Dee wins a sweepstakes prize equal to Dexter's debt, he decides to steal her money out of desperation.
12b	12b	"The Justice Friends: Bee Where?"	Paul Rudish & Genndy Tartakovsky	Butch Hartman & Craig McCracken	December 25, 1996	112b
Major Glory, Krunk, and Valhallen try to rid their apartment of a bee.
12c	12c	"Mandarker"	Genndy Tartakovsky	Lou Romano	December 25, 1996	112c
Following the destruction of his lab by Dexter and Dee Dee (in the episode Dexter's Rival), Mandark turns to magic to beat Dexter at the science fair.
13a	13a	"Inflata Dee Dee"	Genndy Tartakovsky	Genndy Tartakovsky	January 1, 1997	113a
Dee Dee inflates Dexter's hydro-plasmatic suit and constantly floats in the air, prompting Dexter to bring her down.
13b	13b	"The Justice Friends: Can't Nap"	Genndy Tartakovsky	Butch Hartman	January 1, 1997	113b
After fellow Justice Friend White Tiger helps Valhallen stop a super-villain called Mental Mouse, the latter invites him to spend the night in his apartment, forgetting that Major Glory is allergic to cats.
13c	13c	"Monstory"	Rob Renzetti & Genndy Tartakovsky	Don Shank	January 1, 1997	113c
Not interested in hearing Dee Dee's long-winded story, Dexter gives her a new formula to keep her quiet, but instead she is turned into a giant monster still bent on telling her story. When he realizes that nothing can make her quiet, he becomes a giant monster himself.

=== Season 2 (1997–98) ===
This season mostly did away with the "Dial M for Monkey" and "Justice Friends" segments, with most episodes consisting of three "Dexter's Laboratory" stories. Some episodes contained two 11-minute stories instead of three 7-minute ones.

This season is three times the length of the other seasons at 39 half-hour episodes, making it the longest season of a Cartoon Network series and one of the longest seasons of any animated series.

Kat Cressida replaced Allison Moore as the voice of Dee Dee for the majority of this season, with the exception of the segments "Ant Pants", "Chubby Cheese", "Lab of the Lost", and "Figure Not Included".

No. overall	No. in season	Title	Directed by	Written by	Storyboard by	Original release date	Prod. code
14a	1a	"Beard to Be Feared"	Genndy Tartakovsky	Jason Butler Rote	Paul Rudish	July 16, 1997	202a
After watching an Action Hank movie on television, Dexter dons a synthetic beard to imitate his hero, but the police mistake him for Action Hank himself.
14b	1b	"Quackor the Fowl"	Genndy Tartakovsky	Jason Butler Rote	Genndy Tartakovsky	July 16, 1997	202b
Mandark brings his pet lab duck, Ducky, for show and tell to counter Dexter and his lab monkey, Monkey. Unbeknownst to Mandark, Ducky is the alter ego of supervillain Quackor the Fowl.
14c	1c	"Ant Pants"	Genndy Tartakovsky	Jason Butler Rote	Butch Hartman	July 16, 1997	202c
When Dexter catches Dee Dee exterminating ants, he shrinks her and himself to ant size to demonstrate how organized the ants are in a colony.
15a	2a	"Mom and Jerry"	Robert Alvarez	Jason Butler Rote	Andy Bialk & Paul Rudish	July 23, 1997	201a
In a parody of Tom and Jerry, Dexter accidentally swaps his brain with a mouse's and must avoid his mother when she attacks him.
15b	2b	"Chubby Cheese"	Rob Renzetti	Jason Butler Rote	Dave Smith	July 23, 1997	201b
While at a pizza restaurant, Dexter slows down the "Whack the Weasel" machine to win a stuffed Monkey doll before Dee Dee does. Security captures him for tampering with the machine, and he falls into the hands of a mad scientist.
15c	2c	"That Crazy Robot"	Rob Renzetti	Jason Butler Rote	Andy Bialk	July 23, 1997	201c
When Dee Dee frees one of Dexter's deactivated robots, it tries to destroy anyone who is mean to Dee Dee, including her friends, her mother, and Dexter.
16a	3a	"D & DD" (Note: Also known as "Siblings and Sorcery".)	Genndy Tartakovsky	Jason Butler Rote	Paul Rudish	July 30, 1997	203a
After becoming tired of his complicated traps and cheating while playing a tabletop role-playing game, Dexter's friends put Dee Dee in Dexter's place. She changes the style of play, which annoys Dexter but impresses his friends.
16b	3b	"Hamhocks and Armlocks"	Rob Renzetti & Genndy Tartakovsky	Jason Butler Rote	Craig McCracken	July 30, 1997	203b
When Dexter sees Dad being challenged to an arm wrestling match by a man named Earl at a truck stop, Dexter attaches a robotic arm to Dad to enable him to win.
17a	4a	"Hunger Strikes"	Rob Renzetti	Zeke Kamm	Ace Conrad	August 6, 1997	205a
After his parents deny him dessert for not eating his vegetables, Dexter uses radiation therapy to enable himself to like vegetables, but a severe side effect turns him into an Incredible Hulk-like character if he goes too long without them.
17b	4b	"The Koos Is Loose"	Robert Alvarez	Zeke Kamm	Dave Smith	August 6, 1997	205b
Dee Dee's imaginary friend Koosalagoopagoop (Dom DeLuise) suddenly comes to life and starts irritating Dexter.
17c	4c	"Morning Stretch"	Rob Renzetti	Zeke Kamm	Ace Conrad & Genndy Tartakovsky	August 6, 1997	205c
When Dexter oversleeps after staying up late in his lab, he awakes one minute before his school bus arrives. With no time to do his morning chores and homework, he pulls out a device that converts his last 30 seconds into 30 minutes.
18a	5a	"Dee Dee Locks and the Ness Monster"	Robert Alvarez & Genndy Tartakovsky	Zeke Kamm	Paul Rudish	August 13, 1997	204a
When Dexter's mother asks (and then forces) him to read a story to a sickly Dee Dee, Dee Dee becomes bored of Dexter's story and creates one of her own.
18b	5b	"Backfire"	Rob Renzetti	Zeke Kamm	Nora Johnson	August 13, 1997	204b
When Dexter uses anti-matter on the family car to shorten road trips, he accidentally fuses Dee Dee with the car.
18c	5c	"Book 'Em"	Robert Alvarez	Zeke Kamm	Greg Miller & Genndy Tartakovsky	August 13, 1997	204c
When Dee Dee causes Dexter to mistakenly take home a library book without checking it out, they sneak into the library at night to return it.
19a	6a	"Sister's Got a Brand New Bag"	Genndy Tartakovsky	Unknown	Jeff DeGrandis & Genndy Tartakovsky	August 20, 1997	207a
Dee Dee's new dance moves annoy Dexter no end.
19b	6b	"Shoo, Shoe Gnomes"	Rob Renzetti	Unknown	Mike Stern	August 20, 1997	207b
Dexter calls upon the "shoe gnomes" to repair his shoes, but he seeks out Dee Dee to rid himself of them afterwards.
19c	6c	"Lab of the Lost"	Genndy Tartakovsky	Unknown	C. Miles Thompson & Butch Hartman	August 20, 1997	207c
Following a mishap in his lab, Dexter ends up in the old, long-abandoned part of the lab and discovers his early, neglected inventions.
20a	7a	"Labels"	Rob Renzetti	Zeke Kamm	Kevin Kaliher	August 27, 1997	206a
When Dee Dee claims that anything can be hers because Dexter does not have his name on it, he invents a label-making gun.
20b	7b	"Game Show"	Robert Alvarez	Zeke Kamm	Butch Hartman	August 27, 1997	206b
Dexter and Dee Dee compete against each other on a game show.
20c	7c	"Fantastic Boyage"	Robert Alvarez	Zeke Kamm	Daniel Krall	August 27, 1997	206c
When Dexter attempts to inject himself into an ill Dee Dee to find a cure for the common cold, he inadvertently winds up inside his dog, believing that Dee Dee is infected with a dog virus.
21a	8a	"Filet of Soul"	Genndy Tartakovsky	Unknown	Mike Stern	September 3, 1997	211a
When Dexter and Dee Dee refuse to flush their dead goldfish into the toilet, they are haunted by its spirit.
21b	8b	"Golden Diskette"	Genndy Tartakovsky	Unknown	Dave Smith	September 3, 1997	211b
Dee Dee wins a golden diskette, earning her a free trip to the laboratory of Professor Hawk, one of Dexter's favorite scientists.
22a	9a	"Snowdown"	Robert Alvarez & Genndy Tartakovsky	Unknown	Craig McCracken	September 10, 1997	212a
When Dexter falls victim to Dee Dee's snowballs, Dad teaches Dexter to be the snowball terror that Dad once was in his youth.
22b	9b	"Figure Not Included"	Rob Renzetti	Unknown	Butch Hartman	September 10, 1997	212b
Dexter makes his own Major Glory action figure to join the neighborhood's Major Glory gang.
22c	9c	"Mock 5"	Rob Renzetti & Genndy Tartakovsky	Unknown	Craig McCracken	September 10, 1997	212c
Dexter participates in the "Annual Soapbox Derby down Volcano Mountain" featuring Dexter, Dad, Monkey, Dee Dee, and Mandark. It is a parody of Speed Racer.
23a	10a	"Ewww That's Growth"	Rob Renzetti	Zeke Kamm	Mike Stern	September 17, 1997	208a
Unable to ride in a roller coaster due to his height, Dexter invents a device to make himself taller.
23b	10b	"Nuclear Confusion"	Robert Alvarez	Zeke Kamm	Butch Hartman	September 17, 1997	208b
When Dee Dee hides the core of Dexter's nuclear power lamp, he must decipher her clues within one hour to find it.
23c	10c	"Germ Warfare"	Robert Alvarez & Genndy Tartakovsky	Zeke Kamm	Ace Conrad & Genndy Tartakovsky	September 17, 1997	208c
When his family is suffering from the flu, Dexter avoids contracting the illness, but his efforts are thwarted by a sickly Dee Dee.
24a	11a	"A Hard Day's Day"	Rob Renzetti	Unknown	Craig McCracken	September 24, 1997	210a
Dexter struggles to understand why he is having a bad day, and Dee Dee inspires him with astrology.
24b	11b	"Road Rash"	Rob Renzetti	Unknown	Nora Johnson	September 24, 1997	210b
Dexter's parents buy him a bike for exercise, but he is unable to catch Dee Dee on her inline skates.
24c	11c	"Ocean Commotion"	Rob Renzetti	Unknown	Kevin Kaliher	September 24, 1997	210c
Dexter's family goes to the beach, where Dexter tries to communicate with whales. He must rescue Dee Dee (dressed as a mermaid), when she is captured by manic pirates.
25a	12a	"The Bus Boy"	Rob Renzetti & Genndy Tartakovsky	Zeke Kamm	Don Shank	October 1, 1997	209a
After Dexter's pencil rolls to the back of the school bus, he goes to retrieve it, but legend says that no one has ever returned from the back of the bus.
25b	12b	"The Justice Friends: Things That Go Bonk in the Night"	Genndy Tartakovsky	Zeke Kamm	Craig McCracken	October 1, 1997	209b
Krunk stays up watching a 24-hour marathon of TV Puppet Pals, and dreams of becoming part of the show.
25c	12c	"Ol' McDexter"	Robert Alvarez & Genndy Tartakovsky	Zeke Kamm	Mike Stern	October 1, 1997	209c
Dexter is disappointed when he ends up at an Amish farm instead of a high-tech farm for summer camp. His attempts to modernize the Amish family do not go well.
26a	13a	"Sassy Come Home"	Genndy Tartakovsky	Zeke Kamm	Dave Smith	October 8, 1997	213a
Dee Dee befriends a Sasquatch during a camping trip, but Dexter is determined to capture it.
26b	13b	"Photo Finish"	Robert Alvarez & Genndy Tartakovsky	Zeke Kamm	Don Shank	October 8, 1997	213b
When Dee Dee takes photographs of his lab, Dexter goes on an adventure to retrieve the photos before his parents see them.
27a	14a	"Star Check Unconventional"	Rob Renzetti	Zeke Kamm	Paul Rudish	October 15, 1997	215a
When Dexter and his friends go looking for a "Star Check" convention, they accidentally end up at a "Darbie" doll convention.
27b	14b	"Dexter Is Dirty"	Genndy Tartakovsky	Zeke Kamm	Greg Emison & Genndy Tartakovsky	October 15, 1997	215b
When Dexter is tired of bathing, he laminates himself to stay clean.
27c	14c	"Ice Cream Scream"	Robert Alvarez	Zeke Kamm	Kevin Kaliher	October 15, 1997	215c
When Dexter cannot get the ice cream truck to stop for him, he creates a series of obstacles to do so.
28a	15a	"Decode of Honor"	Robert Alvarez & Genndy Tartakovsky	Zeke Kamm	Craig McCracken	October 22, 1997	214a
Dexter and Dee Dee's secret decoder rings hold the keys to joining the Action Hank and Pony Puff fan clubs respectively, but they receive a strange list in order to do so.
28b	15b	"World's Greatest Mom"	Rob Renzetti	Zeke Kamm	Andy Bialk	October 22, 1997	214b
When Dexter accidentally hits his mother with a ray of energy, she gains superpowers.
28c	15c	"Ultrajerk 2000"	Robert Alvarez	Zeke Kamm	Daniel Krall	October 22, 1997	214c
When Dexter creates a robot to assist him, the robot starts controlling his lab and tries to destroy Dexter.
29a	16a	"Techno Turtle"	Rob Renzetti	Jeffrey Delman, Laura Glendinning, & Zeke Kamm	Rob Renzetti	October 29, 1997	216a
When Dee Dee befriends a turtle that gets severely injured, Dexter not only heals it, but gives it superpowers.
29b	16b	"Surprise!"	Robert Alvarez	Jeffrey Delman, Laura Glendinning, & Zeke Kamm	Andy Bialk	October 29, 1997	216b
On his birthday, Dexter makes himself invisible to learn whether his parents bought the Major Glory action figure he always wanted.
29c	16c	"Got Your Goat"	Robert Alvarez & Genndy Tartakovsky	Jeffrey Delman, Laura Glendinning, & Zeke Kamm	Nora Johnson	October 29, 1997	216c
Dexter and Dee Dee go to South America to catch the legendary chupacabra, which Dexter believes is an escaped lab experiment.
30a	17a	"Dee Dee Be Deep"	Genndy Tartakovsky	Zeke Kamm	Chris Savino	November 5, 1997	218a
When Dexter is tired of Dee Dee's bad singing, he inadvertently transforms her voice into a baritone (Kevin Michael Richardson).
30b	17b	"911"	Rob Renzetti & Genndy Tartakovsky	Zeke Kamm	Ace Conrad & Genndy Tartakovsky	November 5, 1997	218b
When his television show is interrupted by the Emergency Broadcast System, Dexter sets about fixing any nearby emergencies to make the signal go away.
30c	17c	"Down in the Dumps"	Robert Alvarez	Zeke Kamm	Kevin Kaliher	November 5, 1997	218c
In a fit of rage, Dexter dumps Dee Dee's favorite teddy bear into the garbage. A traumatized Dee Dee begins to behave oddly, prompting Dexter to go to the garbage dump and get it back.
31a	18a	"Unfortunate Cookie"	Robert Alvarez & Genndy Tartakovsky	Unknown	Kevin Kaliher	November 12, 1997	217a
Dexter and Dee Dee must travel to Chinatown to get their fingers unstuck from a Chinese finger trap.
31b	18b	"The Muffin King"	Genndy Tartakovsky	Unknown	Mike Stern	November 12, 1997	217b
Dexter and Dee Dee protect their mother's freshly baked muffins from their muffin-loving father while she is out shopping.
32a	19a	"Picture Day"	Genndy Tartakovsky	Unknown	Dave Smith	November 19, 1997	219a
Upset that Dee Dee is more photogenic than him, Dexter transforms his face into a handsome one for his next Picture Day.
32b	19b	"Now That's a Stretch"	Genndy Tartakovsky	Unknown	Nora Johnson	November 19, 1997	219b
When Dexter cannot reach anything in his lab, he makes himself more flexible by combining himself with bubble gum.
32c	19c	"Dexter Detention"	Rob Renzetti	Unknown	Dave Smith & Chris Battle	November 19, 1997	219c
Dexter is given detention after accidentally shouting out the answer to a test question.
33a	20a	"Don't Be a Baby"	Robert Alvarez & Genndy Tartakovsky	Unknown	Mike Stern	November 26, 1997	221a
While trying to make himself and Dee Dee older to see an R-rated movie, Dexter accidentally makes everyone in the entire planet babies instead.
33b	20b	"Dial M for Monkey: Peltra"	Genndy Tartakovsky	Unknown	Paul Rudish	November 26, 1997	221b
Peltra wants to turn Monkey into a fur coat.
33c	20c	"G.I.R.L. Squad"	Rumen Petkov	Unknown	Andy Bialk	November 26, 1997	221c
After a crime prevention talk at school, Dee Dee, Lee Lee, and Mee Mee become crime fighters, protecting the neighborhood from a mysterious stranger.
34a	21a	"Sports a Poppin'"	Rob Renzetti & Genndy Tartakovsky	Unknown	Douglas McCarthy & Genndy Tartakovsky	December 3, 1997	222a
When Dad tries to teach his son sports, he realizes that Dexter is not athletic.
34b	21b	"Koosalagoopagoop"	Genndy Tartakovsky	Unknown	Dave Smith	December 3, 1997	222b
Dee Dee enters the land of her imaginary friend Koosalagoopagoop.
34c	21c	"Project Dee Dee"	Robert Alvarez	Unknown	Chris Savino	December 3, 1997	222c
When Dexter learns that Dee Dee is making a science project alone, he decides to help, but she does not want his help.
35a	22a	"Topped Off"	Genndy Tartakovsky	Unknown	Chris Savino	January 14, 1998	220a
Dexter and Dee Dee experiment with coffee after seeing how it energizes their parents in the morning.
35b	22b	"Dee Dee's Tail"	Rumen Petkov	Unknown	Kevin Kaliher	January 14, 1998	220b
After she expresses her desire to become a Pony Puff Princess, Dexter transforms Dee Dee into a horse.
35c	22c	"No Power Trip"	Rob Renzetti	Unknown	Chris Battle	January 14, 1998	220c
Despite his computer's warnings, Dexter consumes too much power during experiments, causing his lab to shut down.
36a	23a	"Sister Mom"	Rob Renzetti & Genndy Tartakovsky	Paul Harrison	Craig McCracken	January 21, 1998	227a
When Dexter is asked to bring his mother to school, he disguises Dee Dee in her place.
36b	23b	"The Laughing"	Robert Alvarez & Genndy Tartakovsky	Paul Harrison	Bryan Mailles & Genndy Tartakovsky	January 21, 1998	227b
After Dexter is bitten by a clown's dentures, he turns into a mad clown nightly, terrorizing the town with his mayhem.
37a	24a	"Dexter's Lab: A Story"	Genndy Tartakovsky	Sami Rank & Michael Ryan	Paul Rudish	January 28, 1998	224a
After Dexter finds a lost Labrador Retriever, he teaches the dog to speak English.
37b	24b	"Coupon for Craziness"	Rumen Petkov	Sami Rank & Michael Ryan	Chris Savino	January 28, 1998	224b
Dexter finds a hyperactive boy who is like Dee Dee and has scientist parents who are like Dexter. Sensing an opportunity to fit in, he switches places with the boy.
37c	24c	"Better Off Wet"	John McIntyre	Sami Rank & Michael Ryan	Andy Bialk	January 28, 1998	224c
Dexter, who cannot swim and is afraid of water, avoids being pushed into the family's new swimming pool by Dad.
38a	25a	"Critical Gas"	Rumen Petkov	Michael Ryan	Mike Stern	February 4, 1998	226a
Dexter suffers severe stomach pains after eating a giant burrito. Following an experiment with a balloon, he assumes that he has only 30 minutes to live.
38b	25b	"Let's Save the World You Jerk!"	John McIntyre	Michael Ryan	Kevin Kaliher	February 4, 1998	226b
Dexter and Mandark team up to fight meteoroids that are hurdling towards the Earth.
38c	25c	"Average Joe"	Rumen Petkov	Michael Ryan	Dave Smith	February 4, 1998	226c
When an intelligence test mistakenly grades Dexter as "average", he shuts down his lab and tries to live like a normal child.
39a	26a	"Rushmore Rumble"	Genndy Tartakovsky	Seth MacFarlane	Genndy Tartakovsky	February 11, 1998	223a
Dexter and Mandark bring the Abraham Lincoln and George Washington faces respectively on Mount Rushmore to life and make them fight each other.
39b	26b	"A Boy and His Bug"	John McIntyre	Seth MacFarlane	Genndy Tartakovsky	February 11, 1998	223b
When Dexter neglects his metal-eating pet bug, it begins eating his lab.
39c	26c	"You Vegetabelieve It!"	Rumen Petkov	Seth MacFarlane	Bob Staake	February 11, 1998	223c
When Dee Dee uses Dexter's growth formula on the plants in the garden, the plants grow into enormous man-eating monsters.
40a	27a	"Aye Aye Eyes"	Genndy Tartakovsky	Unknown	Craig McCracken	February 18, 1998	225a
A little girl with big eyes falls in love with Dexter and follows him after he returns a toy she dropped earlier, much to his chagrin.
40b	27b	"Dee Dee and the Man"	John McIntyre & Genndy Tartakovsky	Unknown	Craig McCracken	February 18, 1998	225b
Dexter "fires" Dee Dee, only to realize that the chaos she causes has been helping him concentrate.
41a	28a	"Old Flame"	Genndy Tartakovsky	Michael Ryan	Paul Rudish	February 25, 1998	229a
When Dexter brings the caveman who first discovered fire back from the past, the caveman acts like Dee Dee and starts smashing the lab.
41b	28b	"Don't Be a Hero"	Rumen Petkov	Michael Ryan	Mike Stern	February 25, 1998	229b
Dexter turns himself into a superhero, but he gives up after every power he tries backfires.
41c	28c	"My Favorite Martian"	John McIntyre	Michael Ryan	Andy Bialk	February 25, 1998	229c
Dexter travels to Mars to find intelligent life, unaware that Dee Dee has stowed away in his space capsule. After Dee Dee gets covered in red dirt, Dexter mistakes her for a real-life Martian.
42a	29a	"Paper Route Bout"	John McIntyre	Michael Ryan	Daniel Krall	March 4, 1998	230a
Dad trains Dee Dee to fight a gang of bicycle-riding rogues dressed as ninjas who target her paper route each morning.
42b	29b	"The Old Switcharooms"	John McIntyre	Michael Ryan	Kevin Kaliher & Craig McCracken	March 4, 1998	230b
For accidentally destroying Dad's brand new bowling trophy, Dexter and Dee Dee are forced to spend some time in each other's rooms; Dexter becomes paranoid that Dee Dee is destroying his lab.
42c	29c	"Trick or Treehouse"	Rumen Petkov	Michael Ryan	Dave Smith	March 4, 1998	230c
Dee Dee builds a tree house and allows everyone inside except Dexter, in revenge for the times he kicked her out of his lab.
43a	30a	"Quiet Riot"	Rumen Petkov & Genndy Tartakovsky	Michael Ryan	Chris Savino	March 11, 1998	231a
After working all night to create his latest invention, Dexter tries to sleep, but he is constantly interrupted by Dee Dee.
43b	30b	"Accent You Hate"	John McIntyre	Michael Ryan	Dave Smith	March 11, 1998	231b
Dexter and his friends are targeted at school by a bully for their multicultural accents.
43c	30c	"Catch of the Day"	Rumen Petkov	Michael Ryan	Bob Staake	March 11, 1998	231c
Dexter and Dad try to get to Dad's fishing spot before sunrise to start fishing before others arrive.
44a	31a	"Dad Is Disturbed"	John McIntyre	Unknown	John McIntyre	March 18, 1998	232a
Dad tries to watch a golf tournament, but is constantly interrupted by his wife, Dexter, and Dee Dee.
44b	31b	"Framed"	Genndy Tartakovsky	Unknown	Kevin Kaliher	March 18, 1998	232b
When Dexter's glasses break, he creates a new fad (wearing glasses with cracked lenses) and becomes extremely popular at his school.
44c	31c	"That's Using Your Head"	John McIntyre	Unknown	Clayton Morrow	March 18, 1998	232c
Dexter thinks that a crazy homeless person balancing electronic devices on his head and muttering gibberish is a genius trying to contact aliens, so he takes him home.
45a	32a	"DiM"	Genndy Tartakovsky	Michael Ryan	Craig McCracken	March 25, 1998	233a
In a mostly dialogue-free episode, Dexter makes a trip to the hardware store to buy a new light bulb for his lab.
45b	32b	"Just an Old-Fashioned Lab Song..."	John McIntyre	Michael Ryan	Dave Smith	March 25, 1998	233b
Dexter reluctantly takes piano lessons from Professor Williams (Paul Williams), but when the Professor stumbles onto Dexter's lab, he discovers that Dexter has more musical talent than he thought.
45c	32c	"Repairanoid"	Rumen Petkov	Michael Ryan	Greg Miller	March 25, 1998	233c
When an electrician comes to Dexter's house to repair a blown-out fuse, he accidentally stumbles onto his laboratory, and Dexter enlists him to repair the lab.
46a	33a	"Sdrawkcab" "Backwards"	John McIntyre	Seth MacFarlane	Clayton Morrow	April 1, 1998	236a
Dexter invents a belt whose wearer can do anything backwards, but mayhem occurs when Dee Dee gets hold of the belt's directional switch.
46b	33b	"The Continuum of Cartoon Fools"	Rumen Petkov & Genndy Tartakovsky	Seth MacFarlane	Don Shank	April 1, 1998	236b
Dexter tries to figure out how Dee Dee keeps entering his lab every time he kicks her out and seals the entrance.
46c	33c	"Sun, Surf, and Science"	Rumen Petkov & Genndy Tartakovsky	Seth MacFarlane	Mike Stern	April 1, 1998	236c
Mandark enters a surfing contest and tries to cheat his way to victory to win Dee Dee's heart from another surfer.
47a	34a	"Big Bots"	Rumen Petkov & Genndy Tartakovsky	Seth MacFarlane	Craig McCracken	April 8, 1998	228a
Dee Dee dares Dexter into building her a giant robot similar to his Robo-Dexo 2000. They then team up to try to save an island's population from being destroyed by an erupting volcano using their giant robots.
47b	34b	"Gooey Aliens That Control Your Mind"	Rumen Petkov & Genndy Tartakovsky	Seth MacFarlane	Todd Frederiksen & Genndy Tartakovsky	April 8, 1998	228b
Dexter's parents and Dee Dee have their minds taken over by an alien life form that escaped from Dexter's lab.
47c	34c	"Misplaced in Space"	Genndy Tartakovsky	Seth MacFarlane	Chris Savino	April 8, 1998	228c
A teleporter malfunction sends Dexter to an alien prison, prompting Dee Dee to go on a mission to save Dexter.
48a	35a	"Dee Dee's Rival"	Rumen Petkov & Genndy Tartakovsky	Unknown	Chris Savino	April 15, 1998	235a
Mandark's sister Olga Astronomonov (a.k.a. Lalavava) tries to upstage Dee Dee at dance school.
48b	35b	"Pslyghtly Psycho"	John McIntyre & Genndy Tartakovsky	Unknown	Daniel Krall	April 15, 1998	235b
On Mother's Day, Dexter's mother has her gloves taken by the family so that she can relax and not do housework, but she is unable to adjust to a life where she cannot keep the house clean.
48c	35c	"Game for a Game"	Rumen Petkov	Unknown	Greg Miller	April 15, 1998	235c
After Dee Dee declares that she can beat Dexter in any game, Dexter challenges her to a series of games in his lab, though he prefers to win by cheating.
49a	36a	"Blackfoot and Slim"	John McIntyre	Seth MacFarlane	Chris Savino	April 22, 1998	237a
A nature documentary team observes "Blackfoot" (Dexter) and "Slim" (Dee Dee) in their "natural habitat".
49b	36b	"Trapped with a Vengeance"	Genndy Tartakovsky	Seth MacFarlane	Todd Frederiksen & Genndy Tartakovsky	April 22, 1998	237b
In a parody of Die Hard, Dexter is trapped in his school by the janitor in revenge for making him work late everyday.
49c	36c	"The Parrot Trap"	Rumen Petkov & Genndy Tartakovsky	Seth MacFarlane	Mark O'Hare	April 22, 1998	237c
Dexter invents a robot parrot that happily repeats self-congratulatory comments he makes, but when it starts repeating things about his lab and escapes, he sets out to destroy it before it tattles to his parents.
50a	37a	"Dexter and Computress Get Mandark!"	John McIntyre	Tyler Samuel Lee	John McIntyre	April 29, 1998	234a
Created and narrated by a six-and-a-half-year-old boy named Tyler Samuel Lee, who sent a tape containing the episode's audio to Cartoon Network, the story follows Dexter and Mandark's robot "brother" Computress teaming up to make Mandark's head shrink.
50b	37b	"The Justice Friends: Pain in the Mouth"	Genndy Tartakovsky	Unknown	Genndy Tartakovsky	April 29, 1998	234b
When Krunk gets a tortilla chip stuck in his tooth, Major Glory decides to fix it by pulling the tooth out himself against Valhallen's admonition to take him to the dentist as they have the tools to take the chip out properly.
50c	37c	"Dexter vs. Santa's Claws"	Rumen Petkov & Genndy Tartakovsky	Unknown	Kevin Kaliher	April 29, 1998	234c
Dexter tries to prove to Dee Dee that Santa Claus is not real.
51a	38a	"Dyno-Might"	Genndy Tartakovsky	Michael Ryan	Paul Rudish	May 6, 1998	238a
In this crossover with Dynomutt, Dog Wonder, Blue Falcon (Gary Owens) comes to Dexter's house and asks him to rebuild an injured Dynomutt.
51b	38b	"LABretto"	Genndy Tartakovsky	Michael Ryan	Dave Smith	May 6, 1998	238b
Dexter's life story, from his birth to the creation of his secret laboratory, is retold as an opera.
52	39	"Last But Not Beast"	Genndy Tartakovsky	Unknown	Paul Rudish, Craig McCracken, & Genndy Tartakovsky	June 15, 1998	239
During a trip to Japan as part of a student exchange program, Dexter accidentally releases a giant monster with an axe-like head from a volcano, forcing him to enlist the aid of his family, along with the cast of The Justice Friends and the cast of Dial M for Monkey, to defeat it.

==== "Rude Removal" ====
An episode segment from the second season was produced yet never aired on television, but was ultimately released to the public in January 2013 on the official YouTube page of Adult Swim.

Title	Directed by	Storyboard by	Release date
"Rude Removal"	Rob Renzetti	Chong Lee & Craig McCracken	February 21, 1998 (World Animation Celebration); January 22, 2013 (online)
Dexter plans to remove Dee Dee's rudeness with his latest invention, the "Rude Removal System". The siblings inadvertently end up inside the device, which splits the pair into two copies, one well-behaved and the other rude.

=== TV movie (1999) ===
A television movie titled Dexter's Laboratory: Ego Trip premiered on Cartoon Network in December 1999. It was the final televised Dexter's Laboratory media in which creator Genndy Tartakovsky was directly involved. Ego Trip was also the last project made by Cartoon Network Studios as division of Hanna-Barbera before the studio branched off as a separate facility when Hanna-Barbera was folded into Warner Bros. Animation.

Title	Directed by	Story by	Storyboard by	Original air date
Dexter's Laboratory: Ego Trip	Genndy Tartakovsky	Chris Savino, Amy Keating Rogers, John McIntyre, Craig McCracken, Paul Rudish, & Genndy Tartakovsky	Dave Smith, Chris Savino, Paul Rudish, & Genndy Tartakovsky	December 10, 1999
After Dexter battles an army of robots who enter his laboratory through his time machine, he travels forward in time in search of the moment when his older self will save the future.

=== Season 3 (2001–02) ===
This is the first season to feature new character designs and UPA-influenced backgrounds, the latter of which was exclusive to this season. It is also the first season to use digital ink and paint, and the first season that Chris Savino takes over as the director.

The third season adopted a different episode format from the other seasons, with most of its episodes being two 9-minute shorts with a 3-minute short in between, rather than the original format of three 7-minute shorts.

Candi Milo replaced Christine Cavanaugh as the voice of Dexter onward during this season, following the first three episodes and the segment "Tele Trauma". Allison Moore returned to voice Dee Dee for this season.

No. overall	No. in season	Title	Directed by	Written by	Storyboard by	Original release date	Prod. code
53a	1a	"Streaky Clean"	Robert Alvarez & Chris Savino	David Smith	Walt Dohrn	November 18, 2001	302a
Dexter creates a satellite to clean stains off of his clothes, but it goes horribly wrong when Mir space station hits the satellite that Dexter created and the satellite becomes damaged, causing the fabric beneath each stain to be eliminated as well.
53b	1b	"A Dad Cartoon"	John McIntyre & Chris Savino	David Smith	John McIntyre	November 18, 2001	302b
Dad decides to give the car a retouch, but keeps breaking things and saying he will fix it later.
53c	1c	"Sole Brother"	John McIntyre & Chris Savino	David Smith	Clayton McKenzie Morrow	November 18, 2001	302c
Dexter accidentally becomes Dee Dee's foot when the two fuse together. Now, they have to wait 24 hours to reverse the fusion.
54a	2a	"Mind Over Chatter"	Robert Alvarez & Chris Savino	Unknown	Cindy Morrow	November 18, 2001	301a
Dexter accidentally gives himself telepathy that he cannot shut off when trying to overhear his father's thoughts to figure out what he got for his birthday, causing everyone to accidentally read his own mind.
54b	2b	"A Quackor Cartoon"	Chris Savino	Unknown	Chris Savino	November 18, 2001	301b
Quackor returns to battle Monkey in Dexter's Lab until Quackor lays an egg; then the two fall in love.
54c	2c	"Momdark"	John McIntyre & Chris Savino	Unknown	Cindy Morrow	November 18, 2001	301c
Mandark disguises himself as Dexter's mom to get into Dexter's Lab. Unfortunately for Mandark, he now has to deal with Dexter, Dad, and Dee Dee's requests, which are too much for him.
55a	3a	"Copping an Aptitude"	John McIntyre & Chris Savino	David Smith	Kevin Kaliher	November 30, 2001	304a
Dexter's school and parents decide to send him to college. He ignores his fellow students, who prefer to "party now, study later", until his mind finally snaps from the workload.
55b	3b	"A Failed Lab Experiment"	Chris Savino	David Smith	Chris Savino	November 30, 2001	304b
When Dexter's new device, made to help him see through solid objects, fails to work as expected, he ends up seeing through people's clothes, which puts him in an uncomfortable situation.
55c	3c	"The Grand-Daddy of All Inventions"	John McIntyre & Chris Savino	David Smith	Clayton McKenzie Morrow	November 30, 2001	304c
During a trip to his grandfather's house, Dexter learns that the outwardly boring old man has a lab just like his own.
56a	4a	"Poppa Wheely"	John McIntyre & Chris Savino	Unknown	Mike Stern	January 18, 2002	303a
It is Career Day, and because Dexter is ashamed of his father, he creates a better father for himself. However, he soon discovers that his real father is much cooler.
56b	4b	"A Mom Cartoon"	Chris Savino	Unknown	Chris Savino	January 18, 2002	303b 312b
65b	13b	"A Mom Cartoon"	Chris Savino	Unknown	Chris Savino	September 20, 2002 (rerun)	303b 312b
Dexter's mom fights another woman at the supermarket for some new latex gloves.
56c	4c	"The Mock Side of the Moon"	John McIntyre & Chris Savino	Unknown	Clayton McKenzie Morrow	January 18, 2002	303c
Dexter travels to the moon and finds that aliens are planning an invasion on Earth, and he uses his Robo-Dexo 2000 to stop them. It turns out that they only were interested in purchasing sweaters for the winter.
57a	5a	"If Memory Serves"	Robert Alvarez & Chris Savino	David Smith	Cindy Morrow	February 22, 2002	306a (611-014)
To keep himself from forgetting anything important, Dexter uses a device to copy his memories, which causes a mayhem in his own head.
57b	5b	"A Mandark Cartoon"	Chris Savino	Unknown	Chris Savino	February 22, 2002	306b (611-105)
Mandark plans another scheme to get rid of Dexter. Everything in this cartoon is to the tune of Mandark's trademark laugh.
57c	5c	"Tele Trauma"	John McIntyre & Chris Savino	Unknown	John McIntyre	February 22, 2002	306c (611-007)
Since his studying is interrupting his favorite TV shows, Dexter creates a helmet to absorb the shows directly. However, the plan backfires when he randomly snaps into television-based outrages.
58a	6a	"A Boy Named Sue"	John McIntyre & Chris Savino	David Smith	Walt Dohrn	March 29, 2002	305a (611-012)
Mandark's birth and origins as the child of hippies are revealed, as is the beginning of his rivalry with Dexter and the cause of his villainy.
58b	6b	"Lab on the Run"	John McIntyre & Chris Savino	David Smith	David Smith	March 29, 2002	305b (611-011)
Two robots (Martin Mull and Fred Willard) escape from Dexter's lab in order to have a better life and avoid Dexter's totalitarian rule.
59a	7a	"Dos Boot"	Chris Savino	David Smith	Walt Dohrn	June 7, 2002	307a
Mandark gets inside Dexter's computer system and creates a computer virus, so Dexter must follow him inside and kick him out from cyberspace. However, Dee Dee has other plans in mind.
59b	7b	"A Dee Dee Cartoon"	Robert Alvarez & Chris Savino	David Smith	Anna Chambers	June 7, 2002	307b
Dee Dee goes and plays in her own "lab" after being kicked out of Dexter's.
59c	7c	"Would You Like That in the Can"	John McIntyre & Chris Savino	David Smith	Paul McEvoy	June 7, 2002	307c
Dexter and his friend Douglas Mordecai must enter the girls' bathroom to retrieve Dexter's lunchbox, which was put in there by another student.
60a	8a	"That Magic Moment"	John McIntyre & Chris Savino	Unknown	Paul McEvoy	June 14, 2002	308a (611-021)
Dexter's Magic Uncle Fergle O'Reilly (Mark Hamill) pays a visit to the family.
60b	8b	"A Silent Cartoon"	Chris Savino	Unknown	Chris Savino	June 14, 2002	308b (611-107)
Parodying The Pink Panther, Dexter is trying to paint his lab blue, but Dee Dee wants to make it pink.
60c	8c	"Opposites Attract"	Chris Savino	Unknown	Andrew Bialk	June 14, 2002	308c (611-018)
Dexter creates a magnetic field to keep Dee Dee away from him, but it malfunctions, causing them to stick together.
61a	9a	"Comic Relief"	Chris Savino	Unknown	Clayton McKenzie Morrow	June 21, 2002	310a (611-024)
Dexter creates a device to make a lifelike superhero comic, with his sister villain "Deestructa".
61b	9b	"A Third Dad Cartoon"	Chris Savino	Unknown	Chris Savino	June 21, 2002	310b (611-109)
Dad sets up a golf swing while Dexter and Dee Dee watch. A sudden downpour ends the swing before it can happen.
61c	9c	"Robo-Dexo 3000"	John McIntyre & Chris Savino	Unknown	Kevin Kaliher	June 21, 2002	310c (611-022)
Dexter creates the ultimate robot to replace his Robo-Dexo 2000.
62a	10a	"Glove at First Sight"	Robert Alvarez & Chris Savino	Unknown	Cindy Morrow	June 28, 2002	311a (611-026)
Dexter's parents remember their first date and dance together.
62b	10b	"A Mom & Dad Cartoon"	Chris Savino	Unknown	Cindy Morrow	June 28, 2002	311b (611-110)
Dexter and Dee Dee listen in on their parents' conversation; they are playing Scrabble, but the way they talk makes it sound like Dad was cheating on Mom.
62c	10c	"Smells Like Victory"	John McIntyre & Chris Savino	Unknown	Paul McEvoy	June 28, 2002	311c (611-023)
The U.S. army invades Dexter's lab under the mistaken impression that aliens are using it as a base of operations on Earth, and Dexter must convince them that this is actually his lab, and also has to keep this a secret from Dee Dee.
63a	11a	"Oh, Brother"	Chris Savino	Unknown	Greg Miller & Walt Dohrn	July 5, 2002	309a (611-003)
Dexter turns Dee Dee into a boy, but is disappointed when "he" (Pamela Adlon) is not a genius as Dexter would like it.
63b	11b	"Another Dad Cartoon"	Chris Savino	Unknown	Cindy Morrow	July 5, 2002	309b (611-108)
With everyone out of the house, Dexter's father decides to spend the time dancing.
63c	11c	"Bar Exam"	John McIntyre & Chris Savino	Unknown	Shellie Kvilvang	July 5, 2002	309c (611-022)
Dexter's parents discover that he is making false excuses to get out of physical education and now Dexter must pass a physical exam if he wants to pass P.E. and move up a few grades.
64a	12a	"Jeepers, Creepers, Where Is Peepers"	David Smith	Unknown	David Smith	July 12, 2002	313a
Dexter and Koos must save Peepers to keep the land of Kooz from disappearing. However, they must contend with a villain who is determined to make the land of Kooz disappear forever.
64b	12b	"Go, Dexter Family! Go!"	John McIntyre & Chris Savino	Unknown	Walt Dohrn	July 12, 2002	313b (611-025)
Dexter's family must rescue him from aliens.
65a	13a	"Scare Tactics"	John McIntyre & Chris Savino	Unknown	Walt Dohrn	September 20, 2002	312a
After watching a horror film, Dexter and his father become easily frightened.
65c	13c	"My Dad vs. Your Dad"	John McIntyre & Chris Savino	Unknown	Cindy Morrow	September 20, 2002	312c
Dexter and Mandark's fathers become embroiled in a conflict after trying to defuse one between their sons.

=== Season 4 (2002–03) ===
The fourth season returned to the first two seasons' format of three 7-minute stories, and similar backgrounds to the first two seasons, dropping the UPA aesthetic from the third season.

Kat Cressida again replaced Allison Moore as the voice of Dee Dee for this season, with the exception of the segment "Chicken Scratch", which was produced in between seasons 3 and 4 and originally released as a theatrical short alongside The Powerpuff Girls Movie on July 3, 2002.

No. overall	No. in season	Title	Directed by	Storyboarded and Written by	Original release date	Prod. code
66a	1a	"Beau Tie"	Don Judge & Chris Savino	Walt Dohrn	November 22, 2002	402a
When Dexter discovers that Beau (Pamela Adlon), Dee Dee's new boyfriend, has similar interests as him, Dexter tries to steal Beau's attention from Dee Dee.
66b	1b	"Remember Me?"	Chris Savino	Kevin Kaliher	November 22, 2002	402b
When Dexter gets amnesia, Dee Dee decides to play tricks on him by creating a whole new identity for him in her image.
66c	1c	"Over-Labbing"	Don Judge & Chris Savino	Clayton McKenzie Morrow	November 22, 2002	402c
Dexter and Mandark drill underground to expand their labs, but end up running into each other's work. So they agree to share the lab, inducing chaos.
67a	2a	"Sis-Tem Error"	Don Judge & Chris Savino	Mark O'Hare	April 25, 2003	401a (626-005)
Dee Dee accidentally shuts down Dexter's lab, and he has to power it back. In the process, Dee Dee attempts to keep Dexter from finding out what she really did.
67b	2b	"Bad Cable Manners"	Chris Savino	Clayton McKenzie Morrow	April 25, 2003	401b
Dexter pirates cable for his father.
67c	2c	"Dexter's Library"	Don Judge & Chris Savino	Mark O'Hare	April 25, 2003	401c (626-001)
Dexter becomes the stern administrator of his local library.
68a	3a	"The Scrying Game"	Chris Savino	Mike Stern	May 2, 2003	405a
Dee Dee learns a new game that can predict the future events.
68b	3b	"Monstrosi-Dee Dee"	Don Judge & Chris Savino	Gabe Swarr	May 2, 2003	405b
When Dee Dee eats a contaminated apple, she turns into a monster every time when she tells Dexter what to do.
68c	3c	"Dad Man Walking"	Don Judge & Chris Savino	Carlos Ramos	May 2, 2003	405c
Dexter's father sleepwalks into Dexter's lab. Dexter discovers this, and now has to escort him out of the lab without waking him up, which proves more difficult than thought.
69a	4a	"Dexter's Little Dilemma"	Don Judge & Chris Savino	Clayton McKenzie Morrow	May 9, 2003	403a
Dexter shrinks his parents and puts them into a model of their house for observation.
69b	4b	"Faux Chapeau"	Don Judge & Chris Savino	Chris Reccardi	May 9, 2003	403b
Dexter's newest invention looks like a hat, so Dee Dee takes it and wears it around town.
69c	4c	"D^{2}"	Tim Walker & Chris Savino	Mark O'Hare	May 9, 2003	403c
Dexter and Dee Dee realize that they make a good team, so they decide to do stuff together, but doing so makes things worse.
70a	5a	"Head Band"	Don Judge & Chris Savino	Kevin Kaliher	May 16, 2003	404a
Dee Dee gets a song stuck in her head, which is actually a virus. Dexter and Mom soon catch it, and Dexter has to reverse the effects of this. He succeeds at the end, not knowing that Dad also caught it.
70b	5b	"Stuffed Animal House"	Chris Savino	Gabe Swarr	May 16, 2003	404b
Dee Dee's stuffed animals come to life and roam the house when Dee Dee uses a formula that brings inanimate objects to life, which delights Dee Dee, much to his dismay.
70c	5c	"Used Ink"	Don Judge & Chris Savino	Carlos Ramos	May 16, 2003	404c
Dexter creates a new type of ink that lets him command people to do whatever he wants. However, when Mandark gets his hands on it, Dexter is the one that becomes commanded.
71a	6a	"School Girl Crushed"	Don Judge & Chris Savino	Charlie Bean	May 23, 2003	407a
Dexter and Mandark are both outperformed by a new girl at school, so they reluctantly team up to get rid of her.
71b	6b	"Chess Mom"	Don Judge & Chris Savino	Charlie Bean	May 23, 2003	407b
Dexter's mother attempts to support him during a chess tournament but does nothing but embarrass him.
71c	6c	"Father Knows Least"	Don Judge & Chris Savino	Carlos Ramos	May 23, 2003	407c
Dexter's father is left to watch the kids while his wife visits her sister.
72a	7a	"Dexter the Barbarian"	Chris Savino	Chris Savino	May 30, 2003	406a
Dexter tries to emulate the barbarian hero of his favorite comic book.
72b	7b	"Tuber Time"	Don Judge & Chris Savino	Mark O'Hare	May 30, 2003	406b
Dexter studies the potato, and when he is fascinated by its power to light up a light bulb, he tries to use it as an energy source.
72c	7c	"Sore Eyes"	Don Judge & Chris Savino	Bill Wray	May 30, 2003	406c
Dexter tries to improve his eyesight by giving himself laser eye surgery, but goes too far in doing so.
73a	8a	"Babe Sitter"	Robert Alvarez & Chris Savino	Mark O'Hare	September 5, 2003	413a (626-019)
Dee Dee is hired by Mandark's parents to babysit him.
73b	8b	"Mountain Mandark"	Don Judge & Chris Savino	Kevin Kaliher	September 5, 2003	413b (626-021)
Mandark gets in touch with nature.
73c	8c	"2Geniuses 2Gether 4Ever (Note: This episode is dedicated to Nelda Ridley, a final checker who died before the episode aired.)"	Don Judge & Chris Savino	Clayton McKenzie Morrow	September 5, 2003	413c (626-020)
Dexter decides to work with Mandark, but finds himself doing all of the work. In the end, Mandark tries to press the button when Dexter connects the plug in the outlet to bring his show title back.
74a	9a	"Height Unseen"	Don Judge & Chris Savino	Kevin Kaliher	September 12, 2003	408a (626-027)
Again tired of being short, but mindful of his past failures, Dexter decides to make everyone shorter than himself.
74b	9b	"Bygone Errors"	Robert Alvarez & Chris Savino	Clayton McKenzie Morrow	September 12, 2003	408b (626-026)
In the future, a now-elderly Dexter talks with an equally-old Dee Dee about their glory days, but is too senile to fully remember the details. His sister is still there to inject her opinions telling him (and the audience) what really happened.
74c	9c	"Folly Calls"	Don Judge & Chris Savino	Bobby London	September 12, 2003	408c (626-016)
When Dee Dee tries to cut off a piece of her hair, she accidentally cuts off one of her pigtails. Dexter gives her a potion to make her missing hair grow back. However, Dee Dee squirts too much of it in her hair, and Dexter must return Dee Dee's hair back to normal.
75a	10a	"Voice Over"	Robert Alvarez & Chris Savino	Charlie Bean	September 19, 2003	409a (626-030)
When Dexter's computer gets laryngitis, Dexter must find a replacement voice.
75b	10b	"The Blonde Leading the Blonde"	Don Judge & Chris Savino	Aaron Springer	September 19, 2003	409b (626-029)
Dexter refuses to admit that blondes have more fun, so Dee Dee secretly dyes his hair blond to prove it to him.
75c	10c	"Comic Stripper"	Don Judge & Chris Savino	Chris Reccardi	September 19, 2003	409c (626-028)
Dexter finds out that all of Mandark's plans are taken from a comic book.
76a	11a	"Tee Party"	Don Judge & Chris Savino	Aaron Springer	September 26, 2003	410a (626-035)
Dexter and his father enter a golf tournament, but Dexter's father proves inept at the sport.
76b	11b	"Dexter's Wacky Races"	Don Judge & Chris Savino	Chris Reccardi	September 26, 2003	410b (626-034)
Dexter, Monkey, Agent Honeydew, the Justice Friends, Dee Dee, her imaginary friend Koosalagoopagoop, Mandark, his parents, and Dexter's parents participate in a cross-country race à la Wacky Races.
77a	12a	"The Lab of Tomorrow"	Don Judge & Chris Savino	Charlie Bean	November 4, 2003	411a
Monkey narrates a documentary of the future of laboratories and sciences.
77b	12b	"Chicken Scratch"	Genndy Tartakovsky	Storyboard by: Genndy Tartakovsky	November 4, 2003 (Note: "Chicken Scratch" originally premiered theatrically on July 3, 2002 in front of The Powerpuff Girls Movie (which was the only Dexter's Laboratory episode to be distributed theatrically by Warner Bros. Pictures), during Season 3's run. It later officially premiered on Cartoon Network on November 4, 2003.)	411b
When Dexter gets chicken pox, Dee Dee warns him not to scratch himself, but he cannot resist and scratches incessantly, eventually transforming into a tainted hen.
77c	12c	"Garage Sale"	Don Judge & Chris Savino	Clayton McKenzie Morrow	November 4, 2003	411c
Dexter creates a device that turns people into hideous blobs. His parents then sell the device in a garage sale, where it ends up in Mandark's hands.
78a	13a	"They Got Chops"	Chris Savino	Kevin Kaliher	November 20, 2003	412a
When Dee Dee's Judo skills prove too much for Dexter, Dexter learns how to fight back at the same dojo she went to.
78b	13b	"Poetic Injustice"	Robert Alvarez & Chris Savino	Mark O'Hare	November 20, 2003	412b
Dexter falls in love with a new girl at his school, but he cannot win her heart until Dee Dee helps him with poetry.
78c	13c	"Comedy of Feathers"	Genndy Tartakovsky & Chris Savino	Genndy Tartakovsky	November 20, 2003	412c
In the series finale, Dexter is forced to take Dee Dee to the zoo. There, she ends up trying to save an ostrich with disastrous results.
