= Roy Braverman =

American television composer (born 1954)

Roy Braverman (born April 28, 1954) is an American sound supervisor, sound editor, and composer, known for his work on Dexter's Laboratory, The Fairly OddParents, Xiaolin Showdown, Phineas and Ferb, The Batman, and the Bionicle films. His works have been nominated for twenty Golden Reel Awards, winning four, and five Daytime Emmy Awards, winning two.

== Career ==
Braverman's first credit in the sound department was in 1983's Winnie the Pooh and a Day for Eeyore. He has since worked on The Transformers: The Movie, Muppet Babies, The Jetsons, Yogi's Treasure Hunt, Jem, The Flintstone Kids, and various other works, usually for The Walt Disney Company, Nickelodeon, or Hanna-Barbera/Cartoon Network Studios, throughout the 1980s, 1990s, 2000s, and 2010s. He has won two Daytime Emmy Awards and four Golden Reel Awards for his sound editing.

== Accolades ==
| Date | Award | Category | Work | Shared with | Result |
|---|---|---|---|---|---|
| 2000 | Golden Reel Awards | Best Sound Editing - Television Animation - Music | Cow and Chicken for "A Couple of Skating Fools"/"He Said, He Said" | —N/a | Nominated |
| 2001 | Golden Reel Awards | Best Sound Editing - Television Animated Series - Sound | SpongeBob SquarePants for "Arrgh!/Rock Bottom" | Timothy J. Borquez, Jeff Hutchins, Eric Freeman, Gabriel Rosas, Monett Holderer, Andrea Lawson | Won |
| 2002 | Golden Reel Awards | Best Sound Editing in Television - Music, Episodic Animation | Dexter's Laboratory for "Mind over Chatter/A Quackor Cartoon/Momdark" | William Griggs | Nominated |
| 2004 | Golden Reel Awards | Best Sound Editing in Television Animation - Music | Dexter's Laboratory for "Dexter's Wacky Races" | Brian F. Mars | Nominated |
| 2004 | Golden Reel Awards | Best Sound Editing in Television Animation - Music | Johnny Bravo for "It's Valentine's Day, Johnny Bravo!" | —N/a | Nominated |
| 2004 | Golden Reel Awards | Best Sound Editing in Direct to Video | Bionicle: Mask of Light | Timothy J. Borquez, Matt Brown, Thomas Syslo, Eric Freeman, Jeff Hutchins, Brian F. Mars, Gordon Hookailo, Paul Menichini, Jason Freedman, Daisuke Sawa, Morgan Gerhard | Won |
| 2005 | Daytime Emmy Awards | Outstanding Sound Editing - Live Action and Animation | The Batman | Mark Keatts, Diasuke Sawa, Thomas Syslo, Mark Howlett, Doug Andham, Jeff Hutchins, Mark Keefer, Timothy J. Borquez, Keith Dickens, Eric Freeman, Mike Garcia | Won |
| 2005 | Daytime Emmy Awards | Outstanding Sound Editing - Live Action and Animation | Xiaolin Showdown | Mark Keatts, Mike Garcia, Kerry Iverson, Diasuke Sawa, Doug Andham, Mark Keefer, Timothy J. Borquez, Jeff Hutchins, Brian F. Mars, Mark Howlett, Thomas Syslo, Eric Freeman | Won |
| 2005 | Golden Reel Awards | Best Sound Editing in Television Animation | Xiaolin Showdown for "Dreamscape" | Thomas Syslo, Timothy J. Borquez, Mark Keatts, Eric Freeman, Daisuke Sawa, Doug Andham, Mark Keefer, Mike Garcia | Nominated |
| 2005 | Golden Reel Awards | Best Sound Editing in Television Animation | The Batman for "The Big Chill" | Thomas Syslo, Timothy J. Borquez, Mark Keatts, Jeff Hutchins, Keith Dickens, Eric Freeman, Doug Andham, Mark Keefer, Mike Garcia, Daisuke Sawa | Nominated |
| 2005 | Golden Reel Awards | Best Sound Editing in Direct to Video | Bionicle 2: Legends of Metru Nui | Timothy J. Basquez, Eric Freeman, Doug Andham, Thomas Syslo, Jeff Hutchins, Brian F. Mars, Mark Howlett, Paul Menichini, Gordon Hookailo, Michael Geisler, Daisuke Sawa, Marc Mailand, Jason Freeman | Won |
| 2006 | Golden Reel Awards | Best Sound Editing - Direct to Video | Bionicle 3: Web of Shadows | Timothy J. Borquez, Thomas Syslo, Tony Orozco, Eric Freeman, Robert Crew, Jeff Hutchins, Doug Andham, Daisuke Sawa, Keith Dickens, Greg Schorer, Mark Howlett, Jason Freedman, Brian F. Mars, Sean Rowe | Nominated |
| 2008 | Golden Reel Awards | Best Sound Editing - SFX, Foley, Dialogue, ADR & Music for TV Animation | Tak and the Power of Juju for "A Shaman's Shaman/The Gift" | Jake Allston, J. Lampinen | Nominated |
| 2010 | Daytime Emmy Awards | Outstanding Sound Editing - Live Action and Animation | Phineas and Ferb | Robert Poole II, Robbi Smith | Nominated |
| 2010 | Golden Reel Awards | Best Sound Editing - Sound Effects, Foley, Dialogue, ADR and Music Animation in Television | The Fairly OddParents for "Wishology: The Big Beginning" | Heather Olsen, Robbi Smith, J. Lampinen, Mishelle Fordham | Nominated |
| 2012 | Daytime Emmy Awards | Outstanding Sound Editing - Animation | Transformers Prime | Robbi Smith, Robert Poole II | Nominated |
| 2012 | Golden Reel Awards | Best Sound Editing - Sound Effects, Foley, Dialogue and ADR Animation in Television | Phineas and Ferb the Movie: Across the 2nd Dimension | Robert Poole II, Robbi Smith, J. Lampinen | Nominated |
| 2013 | Golden Reel Awards | Best Sound Editing - Sound Effects, Foley, Dialogue and ADR Animation in Television | Robot and Monster for "Security Risk/Ogo's Birthday" | Heather Olsen, J. Lampinen, Anna Adams | Nominated |
| 2014 | Daytime Emmy Awards | Outstanding Sound Editing - Animation | Monsters vs. Aliens | Robert Poole II, Adam Berry, Michael Petak, J. Lampien | Nominated |
| 2014 | Golden Reel Awards | Best Sound Editing - Sound Effects, Foley, Dialogue and ADR Animation in Television | T.U.F.F. Puppy for "Mud with Power/Legal Beagle" | Heather Olsen, Robbi Smith, J. Lampinen | Nominated |
| 2014 | Golden Reel Awards | Best Sound Editing - Sound Effects, Foley, Dialogue and ADR Animation in Television | Phineas and Ferb for "Mission Marvel" | Robert Poole II, Robbi Smith, J. Lampinen | Nominated |
| 2014 | Golden Reel Awards | Best Sound Editing - Sound Effects, Foley, Dialogue and ADR Animation in Television | Gravity Falls for "Gideon Rises" | Heather Olsen, Robbi Smith, J. Lampinen, Brad Breeck | Nominated |
| 2014 | Golden Reel Awards | Best Sound Editing - Sound Effects, Foley, Dialogue and ADR Animation in Television | The Fairly OddParents for "Dumbbell Curve" | Heather Olsen, Robbi Smith, J. Lampinen | Won |
| 2015 | Golden Reel Awards | Best Sound Editing - Sound Effects, Foley, Dialogue and ADR Animation in Television | Penn Zero: Part-Time Hero for "North Pole Down" | Eric Freeman, Mark Stephan Kondracki, J. Lampien | Nominated |
| 2016 | Golden Reel Awards | Best Sound Editing - Sound Effects, Foley, Dialogue and ADR Animation in Television | Penn Zero: Part-Time Hero for "Massive Morphy Merge Mechs" and "Ultrahyperball" | Eric Freeman, Mark Stephan Kondracki, Craig Ng, Kate Finan, Jessey Drake | Nominated |
