= If Memory Serves =

If Memory Serves may refer to:

- "If Memory Serves", season 2 episode 8 of Star Trek: Discovery
- "If Memory Serves (Dexter's Laboratory)", season 3 episode 5a of Dexter's Laboratory
