= Dumb and Dumber (TV series) =

American animated television series

- Based on: Dumb and Dumber by Peter Farrelly; Bobby Farrelly; Bennett Yellin
- Written by: Patrick Moran; Bennett Yellin
- Directed by: David Feiss
- Voices of: Matt Frewer; Bill Fagerbakke
- Composer: Mark Mothersbaugh
- Country of origin: United States
- Original language: English
- No. of episodes: 13 (23 segments)

Production
- Executive producers: Sherry Gunther; Sasha Emerson; Robert Friedman
- Producer: Byron Vaughns
- Running time: 22 minutes
- Production companies: Hanna-Barbera Cartoons; New Line Television

Original release
- Network: ABC
- Release: October 28, 1995 – February 3, 1996

Dumb and Dumber (also known as Dumb and Dumber: The Animated Series) is an American animated series produced by Hanna-Barbera Cartoons and New Line Television for ABC. It is based on the 1994 film. It aired from October 28, 1995 to February 3, 1996, making it the last Hanna-Barbera show to air on a television channel other than Cartoon Network.

Matt Frewer provided the voice of Lloyd Christmas (Jim Carrey's character in the film), while Bill Fagerbakke voiced the character of Harry Dunn (Jeff Daniels' character in the movie). The pilot episode was co-written by Bennett Yellin, co-writer of the original film. The series was cancelled after one season.

Dumb and Dumber was one of three animated series based on Jim Carrey films premiering in the same year; the others are the 1995–2000 Ace Ventura: Pet Detective series, and the 1995–1997 The Mask: Animated Series.

== Premise ==
The cartoon revolves around the continued misadventures of Lloyd and Harry after reacquiring their dog shaped van now named "Otto". It also features a new character, Kitty, a female pet purple beaver who appears to be smarter than both men.

== Voice cast ==
- Matt Frewer as Lloyd Christmas
- Bill Fagerbakke as Harry Dunne

== Episodes ==
No.	Title	Written by	Original release date
1	"Otto's Best Friend"	Len Janson & Bennett Yellin	October 28, 1995
2	"Dumb Luck" "Dumbbells"	Sib Ventress Brent Aspland	November 4, 1995
3	"Top Dumbs"	Ken Koonce & Michael Merton	November 11, 1995
4	"Dixie Dolts" "Neither Rain nor Sleet nor Dumbness"	Ben Hurst Michael Ryan	November 18, 1995
5	"Horse Non-sense" "Senseless in Seattle" "Mmm, Cheesy"	Michael Ryan Sib Ventress Jason Butler Rote	November 25, 1995
6	"Movers and Breakers" "To Bee or Not to Bee"	Philip Murphy Steve Bluestein	December 2, 1995
7	"Dream a Little Scream" "Speed and Speedier"	Glenn Leopold Chris Parrish	December 9, 1995
8	"Santa Klutz" "Hole in Something"	Story by: Steve Bluestein; Teleplay by: Steve Bluestein & Michael Ryan Brent Aspland	December 16, 1995
9	"Brain, Brain, Go Away"	Sib Ventress	January 6, 1996
10	"Home Cookin'"	Philip Murphy	January 13, 1996
11	"Bootcampers" "Overbite in Paradise"	John Jacobs & Sib Ventress David Reynolds	January 20, 1996
12	"Chipped Dip" "Laundryland Lunacy"	Ben Hurst Billy Kimball	January 27, 1996
13	"Harry Canary" "Alienated"	Sib Ventress Ben Hurst and Sib Ventress	February 3, 1996

== Production ==
Dumb and Dumber: The Animated Series is the final Hanna-Barbera-produced show to premiere on ABC (as well as the final Hanna-Barbera-produced show to air on broadcast network television) and one of the last Saturday morning cartoons on the network not associated with The Walt Disney Company. The series was produced by Hanna-Barbera in association with New Line Television (the television division of New Line Cinema, distributor of the original film).

== Release ==
=== Broadcast ===
In Britain, the series was screened on Cartoon Network before receiving terrestrial airings on Channel 4 (unlike The Mask: Animated Series and Ace Ventura: Pet Detective, two other shows based on a film starring Jim Carrey, both of which were shown by the BBC).

=== Home media ===
A VHS tape containing some episodes of the show, including "Dumb Luck", was released in Australia and Russia in the 1990s, but in the United States, the show was not released on home video until 2015.

Warner Home Video released Dumb and Dumber: The Complete Series on DVD in region 1 as part of their Warner Archive Collection in January 2015. This is a Manufacture-on-Demand (MOD) release, available exclusively through Warner's online store and Amazon.com.

An oldies album called "Get Down, Get Dumb" was released to promote the cartoon due to its popularity.

=== Streaming ===
All 13 episodes of the series are available for purchase on Amazon Video, YouTube, and Google Play.
