= Rude Removal =

Banned episode of Dexter's Laboratory from 1997

- Dexter's Laboratory segment
- Title card with Dee Dee giving the finger and Dexter mooning
- Episode no.: Season 2 (segment)
- Directed by: Rob Renzetti
- Written by: Chong Lee (Note: Storyboards); Craig McCracken
- Original air dates: February 21, 1998 (Note: World Animation Celebration); January 22, 2013 (Note: Online)
- Running time: 7 minutes

Episode chronology
- Dexter's Laboratory season 2

"Rude Removal" is an episode segment in the second season of Cartoon Network's animated television series Dexter's Laboratory. Hanna-Barbera produced it in 1997 as part of the second season, but was left unaired due to foul language. In the segment, Dexter and Dee Dee are accidentally split into two pairs, one polite and one rude, with each respectively having British and New York accents. The latter is depicted as using profanity with bleep censorship. The segment was only screened at some animation festivals before finally being released online by Adult Swim on January 22, 2013.

== Plot ==
Dexter invents the Rude Removal System, a machine to remove the rudeness from his sister Dee Dee. However, Dee Dee thinks Dexter is the one who is rude. They start fighting and both wind up in the machine. Inadvertently, the Rude Removal System is activated, splitting the pair into well-behaved and rude halves, with the well-behaved duplicates speaking with English accents, and the rude duplicates speaking with New York City accents while using profanity. The rude pair harbor destructive tendencies by embarrassing their mother while she has her friends over and wrecking the house, prompting her to tell them off and send them to their rooms. Soon, the nice pair manage to trick their rude halves back into the Rude Removal System and reverse the process by reactivating it to combine the rude and polite halves. The segment ends with Dexter and Dee Dee's very angry mother standing in front of them holding a bar of soap, poised to wash the filthy words from their mouths before the screen cuts to black after a Dexter's cursing.

== Production ==
The "Rude Removal" segment was produced during the second season of Dexter's Laboratory in 1997, and features a seven-minute runtime. It was directed by Rob Renzetti and storyboarded by Chong Lee and Craig McCracken, the latter of whom did confirm that he never had a copy, and neither did creator Genndy Tartakovsky. Main cast member Jeff Bennett did not participate in a voice role throughout this segment. The segment was never broadcast on television. Series creator Genndy Tartakovsky commented that "standards didn't like it". Linda Simensky, then-vice president of original programming for Cartoon Network, said "I still think it's very funny. It probably would air better late at night." After being asked about it on his Tumblr page, Calvin Wong, writer and storyboard artist for Regular Show, said that Cartoon Network denied that it was in their media library. The title card depicted Dee Dee giving the finger and Dexter mooning at the audience.

== Screenings and release ==
Despite never airing on television, "Rude Removal" did see limited showing at certain animation festivals and conventions, including an event at the 1998 World Animation Celebration on February 21, 1998. Tartakovsky would sometimes show the cartoon when he spoke in public. One such showing occurred during a lecture given at the Rhode Island School of Design on November 15, 2008. He was asked about the segment during a Reddit AMA in October 2012, and he replied "Next time I do a public appearance, I'll bring it with me!". Adult Swim later asked fans on Twitter if there was still any interest in the segment, and the response was "overwhelming".

The segment was finally uploaded to YouTube and Adult Swim's official website on January 22, 2013. The episode was made private shortly after its upload.

== Reception ==
In his review of "Rude Removal", Erik Adams of The A.V. Club opined that the segment was "nowhere near as crass" as anticipated. He concluded that "if Cartoon Network would've aired 'Rude Removal' with all its bleeps intact, we would've never learned how to use such filthy language."

== See also ==
- "Man's Best Friend", an episode in The Ren & Stimpy Show that was also produced but barred from release for obscene content
- "Sailor Mouth", an episode in SpongeBob SquarePants that also featured censored swearing
