= Jason Butler Rote =

American television screenwriter

Jason Butler Rote is an American television writer, known mainly for his work at Hanna-Barbera on Cartoon Network animated television series like Dexter's Laboratory (1996–2003) and The Powerpuff Girls (1998–2005). He attended McClintock High School in Tempe, Arizona, and graduated from the film department of California State University, Northridge.

== Filmography ==
Year(s)	Work	Role	Notes
1993–1995	2 Stupid Dogs	Unit production coordinator (26 episodes)	TV series
1994	Scooby-Doo! in Arabian Nights	Unit production coordinator	TV movie
1994	A Flintstones Christmas Carol	Unit production coordinator	TV movie
1995	Dumb and Dumber	Writer (1 episode)	TV series
1996	Timon & Pumbaa	Writer (1 episode)	TV series
1996	What a Cartoon!	Creator, writer, and storyboard artist (1 episode)	TV series; segment: "Godfrey & Zeek in 'Lost Control'"
1996–1998	Dexter's Laboratory	Head writer (47 episodes)	TV series
1998–2000	The Powerpuff Girls	Writer (9 episodes)	TV series
2000	Cartoon Cartoon Fridays	Writer	TV programming block
2002	Whatever Happened to... Robot Jones?	Story outline (2 episodes)	TV series

== Other work ==
In 1995 Rote, along with Mark Hughes and Joe LoCicero, published The Jetsons Character Reference Guide under the Hanna-Barbera label.

== Awards and nominations ==
He and fellow writer Paul Rudish won an Annie Award in 1997 in the category "Best Individual Achievement: Writing in a TV Production" for their work on the Dexter's Laboratory episode "Beard to Be Feared". He was also nominated for three Primetime Emmy Awards: in 1997 and 1998 for Dexter's Laboratory and in 1999 for The Powerpuff Girls.

Date	Award	Category	Work	Shared with	Result
1997	Annie Awards	Best Individual Achievement: Writing in a TV Production	Dexter's Laboratory (for "Beard to Be Feared")	Paul Rudish	Won
1997	Primetime Emmy Awards	Outstanding Animated Program (For Programming One Hour or Less)	Dexter's Laboratory (for "Star Spangled Sidekicks", "T.V. Superpals", and "Game Over")	Sherry Gunther, Larry Huber, Craig McCracken, Genndy Tartakovsky	Nominated
1998	Primetime Emmy Awards	Outstanding Animated Program (For Programming One Hour or Less)	Dexter's Laboratory (for "Dyno-Might" and "LABretto")	Davis Doi, Genndy Tartakovsky, and Michael Ryan	Nominated
1999	Primetime Emmy Awards	Outstanding Animated Program (For Programming One Hour or Less)	The Powerpuff Girls (for "Bubblevicious" and "The Bare Facts")	Craig McCracken, John McIntyre, Amy Keating Rogers, and Genndy Tartakovsky	Nominated
