= John McIntyre (cartoonist) =

American animator, writer, director, and artist

- Born: Jersey City, New Jersey, U.S.
- Occupations: Animator, writer, director, storyboard artist
- Years active: 1986–present
- Spouse: Emily Lagergren (m. 2018)

John McIntyre is an American animator, writer, director, and storyboard artist.

== Filmography ==
Year	Title	Role	Notes
1986	The Most Wonderful Egg in This World	Animation Camera	
1987	Santabear's High Flying Adventure	Animator	
1989	Suffering Bastards	Animator	
1994	The Critic	Animation timer	Various episodes
1995–1996	Rocko's Modern Life	Additional writer, storyboard artist, art director, animation timer, animation director, assistant director	Various episodes
1995–1996	The Cartoon Cartoon Show	Creator, writer, director	Various episodes
1996	Hey Arnold!	Storyboard artist	Episode: "The List"
1997	Johnny Bravo	Director, layout artist (Season 1)	Various episodes
1997	Cow and Chicken	Storyboard artist, director	Episode: "Alive!"
1998–2003	Dexter's Laboratory	Storyboard artist, animator, story, writer, director, animation director	Various episodes
1998–2005	The Powerpuff Girls	Storyboard artist, writer, director, animation director	Various episodes
1999	Dexter's Laboratory: Ego Trip	Story	
2001	My Freaky Family: Welcome to My World	Creator, writer, director, animation layout	Pilot
2002–2003	The Grim Adventures of Billy & Mandy	Director, storyboard artist, writer, supervising director	Various episodes
2002	Super Santa in South Pole Joe	Sheet timer	
2002–2004	Evil Con Carne	Director	Various episodes
2003	Looney Tunes: Back in Action	Storyboard artist	
2005	Family Guy Presents Stewie Griffin: The Untold Story	Storyboard artist	Segment: "Stewie B. Goode"
2005	The Great Pinkerton	Creator, executive producer	Made for Sunday Pants
2006	Welcome to Wackamo	Creator, executive producer, voice of Elliot	Pilot
2006	Brandy & Mr. Whiskers	Director	Various episodes
2007	The Replacements	Timing director	Various episodes
2007–2008	My Gym Partner's a Monkey	Main title storyboard, supervising director, sheet timer	Seasons 3–4
2008–2010	The Marvelous Misadventures of Flapjack	Supervising director, sheet timer	Various episodes
2010	Adventure Time	Sheet timer	Various episodes
2011	Sym-Bionic Titan	Animation director	Episode: "Disenfranchised"
2011–2015	T.U.F.F. Puppy	Director	Various episodes
2011; 2016	The Fairly OddParents	Director	Various episodes
2014	Uncle Grandpa	Animation director	Episode: "Prank Wars"
2016–2021	Ben 10	Animation director	Various episodes
