= Dexter's Laboratory =

American animated television series

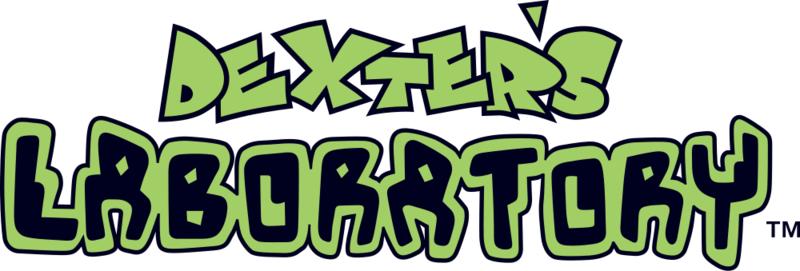
- Genre: Adventure; Comedy; Slapstick; Science fiction
- Created by: Genndy Tartakovsky
- Showrunners: Genndy Tartakovsky (Note: Seasons 1–2); Chris Savino (Note: Seasons 3–4)
- Voices of: Christine Cavanaugh (Note: Seasons 1–3 and Ego Trip); Candi Milo (Note: Seasons 3–4); Allison Moore (Note: Seasons 1 and 3); Kat Cressida (Note: Seasons 2 and 4, including Ego Trip); Kath Soucie; Jeff Bennett; Eddie Deezen; Rob Paulsen; Tom Kenny; Frank Welker
- Theme music composer: Thomas Chase; Steve Rucker; Gary Lionelli (Note: Dial M for Monkey and The Justice Friends segments)
- Opening theme: "Dexter's Laboratory (Main Title)"
- Ending theme: "Dexter's Laboratory (End Title)" (Note: Narration by Mako Iwamatsu; performed by Agostino Castagnola)
- Composers: Thomas Chase; Steve Rucker; Gary Lionelli
- Country of origin: United States
- Original language: English
- No. of seasons: 4
- No. of episodes: 78 (Note: The series contains 216 segments.) (list of episodes)

Production
- Executive producers: Genndy Tartakovsky; Sherry Gunther; Larry Huber; Buzz Potamkin; Fred Seibert
- Producers: Genndy Tartakovsky; Davis Doi; Brian A. Miller; Chris Savino
- Running time: 22 minutes
- Production company: Cartoon Network Studios (Note: Produced under Hanna-Barbera Cartoons for seasons 1–2.)

Original release
- Network: Cartoon Network (Note: Early episodes initially premiered on TBS and TNT before airing on Cartoon Network.)
- Release: April 27, 1996 – June 15, 1998
- Release: November 18, 2001 – November 20, 2003

Related
- What a Cartoon!

Dexter's Laboratory (Note: Commonly abbreviated as Dexter's Lab or simply Dexter) is an American animated science fiction comedy television series created by Genndy Tartakovsky for Cartoon Network. The series follows Dexter, an enthusiastic boy-genius with a science laboratory in his bedroom, which he keeps secret from his unsuspecting parents. Dexter is at constant odds with his older and more extroverted sister Dee Dee, who regularly accesses the laboratory and inadvertently foils his experiments. Prominently featured in the first and second seasons are other segments focusing on superhero-based characters Monkey, Dexter's pet lab-monkey with a superhero alter ego, and the Justice Friends, a trio of superheroes who share an apartment.

Tartakovsky pitched the series to Fred Seibert's animated shorts showcase What a Cartoon! at Hanna-Barbera, basing it on student films he produced at the California Institute of the Arts. Four pilots aired on Cartoon Network and TNT from 1995 to 1996. The first pilot "Changes" became the former network's highest-rated What a Cartoon! short, and viewer approval ratings led to a half-hour series, becoming the first original series under the Cartoon Cartoons moniker. Two seasons aired from April 27, 1996, to June 15, 1998, totaling 52 episodes. On December 10, 1999, a television film titled Dexter's Laboratory: Ego Trip aired as the intended series finale, before the series was revived for a second run of episodes. Due to Tartakovsky's departure, Chris Savino served as showrunner for the revival, which aired for two more seasons from November 18, 2001 to November 20, 2003, ending the series at 78 episodes.

Dexter's Laboratory became one of Cartoon Network's most successful original series, which helped increase the network's ratings in the late 1990s and early 2000s. It received high viewership in the United States on cable television, becoming the network's highest-rated original series in 1996 and 1997. Critics lauded its humor, intelligence, and originality, ranking the series as one of the best cartoons in various lists. It was nominated for four Primetime Emmy Awards for Outstanding Animated Program (for Programming One Hour or Less) from 1995 to 1998 and won three Annie Awards. The series spawned various merchandise, including albums, books, home video releases, toys, and video games.

== Premise ==
Dee Dee (left) walks through the laboratory with her brother Dexter (right).

Dexter (voiced by Christine Cavanaugh in seasons 1–3 and Ego Trip; Candi Milo in seasons 3–4) is a bespectacled boy-genius who lives in a suburban neighborhood with his parents, only addressed as Mom (voiced by Kath Soucie) and Dad (voiced by Jeff Bennett), and his hyperactive, carefree, older sister Dee Dee (voiced by Allison Moore in seasons 1 and 3; Kat Cressida in seasons 2 and 4, including Ego Trip). Dexter conceals a vast secret laboratory and solves problems ranging from saving the world to defeating school bullies. Dee Dee delights in playing haphazardly in the laboratory, wreaking havoc with Dexter's inventions.

=== Recurring segments ===
==== Dial M for Monkey ====
Dial M for Monkey follows Monkey (vocal effects provided by Frank Welker), Dexter's pet laboratory monkey who is secretly a crime-fighting superhero. He is joined by his partner Agent Honeydew (voiced by Kath Soucie) and a team of assembled superheroes.

==== The Justice Friends ====
The Justice Friends follows Major Glory (voiced by Rob Paulsen), Valhallen (voiced by Tom Kenny), and the Infraggable Krunk (voiced by Frank Welker) who shared an apartment. Major Glory acts as a patriot; Valhallen wields with his electric guitar and speaks "between Shakespearean English and surfer dialect"; and the Infraggable Krunk is a purple monster with the intelligence of a child. According to Den of Geek, the trio are parodies of Captain America, Thor, and the Hulk that deal with "mundane sitcom stuff [...] with a superhero twist."

== Episodes ==
Season	Segments	Episodes	Originally released	
Season	Segments	Episodes	First released	Last released
Pilots	N/A	4	February 26, 1995	April 14, 1996
1	34	13	April 27, 1996	January 1, 1997
2	108	39	July 16, 1997	June 15, 1998
Ego Trip			December 10, 1999	
3	36	13	November 18, 2001	September 20, 2002
4	38	13	November 22, 2002	November 20, 2003

=== Notes ===
- The second season episode "Dexter and Computress Get Mandark!" was created by Long Island resident Tyler Samuel Lee, who submitted his idea to Tartakovsky as an audiotape at the age of six. Lee's recorded narration is used in the episode. Tartakovsky—who often received letters and comments from other fans—praised Lee for "[capturing] the imaginative kid perspective we're always striving for." The episode was animated with "crayon-like backgrounds" and "crudely drawn characters" to visualize the imagination of a second grader.
- The second season episode "Rude Removal" was produced, but not aired. It involves Dexter creating a "rude removal system" to diminish Dee Dee and Dexter's rudeness that instead creates highly rude clones of both siblings. "Rude Removal" was only shown during certain animation festivals and was never aired on television due to the characters swearing. "Rude Removal" became available on Adult Swim's YouTube channel on January 22, 2013.
- "Chicken Scratch" debuted theatrically with The Powerpuff Girls Movie on July 3, 2002, and was later broadcast as a season four episode on November 4, 2003, on Cartoon Network.

=== Controversy ===
"Dial M for Monkey: Barbequor", a season 1 episode from 1996, was removed from rotation after being broadcast in the United States. It features a character named the Silver Spooner (a spoof of Silver Surfer), which was perceived by Cartoon Network to be a stereotype of gay men. Second, Krunk appears to become drunk, has a hangover, and vomits off-camera. In later broadcasts and on its Season 1 DVD (Region 1), "Barbequor" has been replaced with "Dexter's Lab: A Story", an episode from season two.

== Production ==
=== Background ===
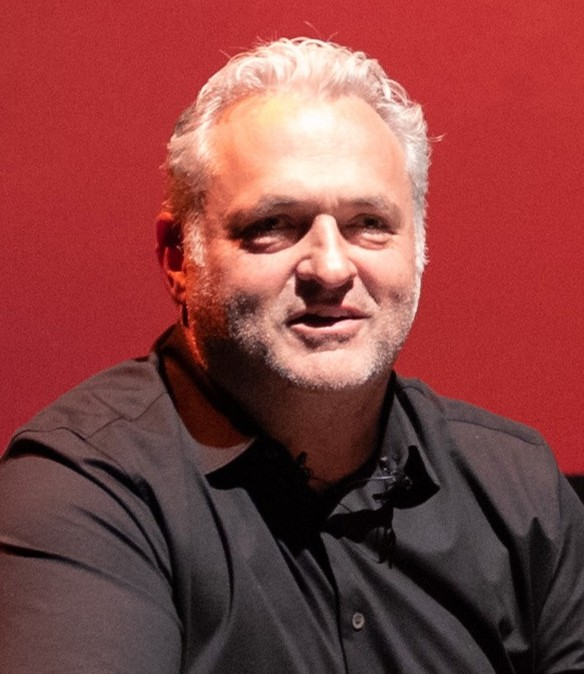
Dexter's Laboratory creator Genndy Tartakovsky at the Annecy International Animation Film Festival in 2023.

Genndy Tartakovsky, the creator of Dexter's Laboratory, was born in Moscow, where his father, a dentist, served in the government of the Soviet Union. Although relatively wealthy and well-connected, his family feared racial persecution due to their Jewish heritage and moved from Russia to Chicago when Tartakovsky was seven. Along with his older brother Alex, Tartakovsky learned English by watching cartoons and taught himself how to draw as a child by copying comic books.

Tartakovsky initially went to Columbia College Chicago to study advertising and took an animation class as an elective. After he transferred to the California Institute of the Arts in 1990 to study animation full-time, Tartakovsky wrote, directed, animated, and produced two student short films; one of which was a precursor to Dexter's Laboratory's first television pilot "Changes", featuring the voices of Rob Renzetti as Dexter and Allison Moore as Dee Dee. A two-and-a-half-minute pencil test produced in 1991–92 as his second student film, "Changes" was included in a university screening for the producers of Batman: The Animated Series, who were impressed and hired Tartakovsky to move to Spain to work on Batman at a studio in Madrid.

After Batman, Tartakovsky moved back to California to work for Hanna-Barbera on the production team of 2 Stupid Dogs. His co-workers on that series, Craig McCracken, Rob Renzetti, and Paul Rudish, had been classmates of his at Cal Arts, with Renzetti and Mccracken being his roommates, and went on to collaborate with him as part of the core creative crew for Dexter's Laboratory. Tartakovsky's last job before developing Dexter's Laboratory into a television series was to serve as a sheet timer on The Critic.

=== Development ===
During his time on The Critic, Tartakovsky received a phone call from Larry Huber, who had been a producer on 2 Stupid Dogs. Huber had shown Tartakovsky's unfinished student film to a then-nascent Cartoon Network and wanted Tartakovsky to expand the concept into a seven-minute storyboard. Unhappy with his position on The Critic, Tartakovsky accepted Huber's proposal. During the production of the pilot "Changes", Tartakovsky felt profoundly dissatisfied with the score, the sound effects, and the entire second half, which he chose to redo entirely to create a second cut. After seeing the revision, producer Fred Seibert felt convinced that the concept for Dexter's Laboratory could be successful. The pilot premiered on February 26, 1995, as part of Cartoon Network's animation showcase series World Premiere Toons. After "Changes" premiered, Tartakovsky had no expectations that it would lead to a series. However, in September 1995, Turner Entertainment Co. announced the series greenlight of Dexter's Laboratory, which became the first of sixteen shorts to earn the vote of approval based on feedback from focus groups, phone lines, the America Online reaction, the ten-city "Dive-In Theater" tour, and the "Cool Toons Mobile". After Tartakovsky and his former classmates McCracken and Rudish finished "Changes" and The Powerpuff Girls' debut short "Meat Fuzzy Lumpkins" for World Premiere Toons, they proceeded to work on the second short film for Dexter's Laboratory titled "The Big Sister".

When Dexter's Laboratory received a series greenlight by Cartoon Network president Betty Cohen and Cartoon Network Senior Vice President of programming Mike Lazzo, Tartakovsky became one of the youngest animation directors during the time period at the age of 27. In developing Dexter's Laboratory, he continued the tradition of making "violent cartoons", explaining that "many people like them because they project themselves in the drawings and they laugh," while following the principles of older Hanna-Barbera cartoons. The production process for an episode was unique compared to most animated series at the time. Similar to The Dick Van Dyke Show, the story ideas for the episodes were created during pitch sessions. The stories would be transferred into storyboards with dialogue written, condensing and combining concepts into a story. Popular culture references were added as part of the jokes to entertain the series' audience.

The first season premiered on TNT on April 27, 1996, and the following day on Cartoon Network and TBS. By August 1996, Dexter's Laboratory was renewed for a second season, premiering on Cartoon Network on July 16, 1997. The television film Dexter's Laboratory: Ego Trip premiered on December 10, 1999, on Cartoon Network. During a press conference in New York City held on February 21, 2001, Cartoon Network announced that it ordered more than 110 episodes of renewed original series, including Dexter's Laboratory. As Tartakovsky was immersed in launching his next series Samurai Jack, Chris Savino replaced Tartakovsky as creative director. By the fourth season, Savino was promoted to producer giving him further control of the series, including the budget. To promote the third season, a twelve-hour marathon titled "Dexter Goes Global" was broadcast on November 18, 2001, in 96 countries and twelve languages. It featured fan-selected episodes of Dexter's Laboratory and culminated by premiering the first two episodes of the third season. Dexter's Laboratory concluded on November 20, 2003.

=== Character conception ===
"It actually started with Dee Dee. I wanted to animate a girl dancing. So, I drew this skinny, big-headed girl dancing. When I had finished her, I thought, what would be the opposite of her? So, I drew a block. That's Dexter. Then I thought if she's into arts, he's into science."

— Tartakovsky, Chicago Sun-Times

During Tartakovsky's second year at CalArts, he animated a tall ballerina and a boxy scientist for his second student short film. Although they were unnamed at the time, the two characters would develop into Dee Dee and Dexter. Early in development, Dee Dee was initially intended to be the protagonist; Dexter and Dee Dee's roles were later switched altogether. To contrast the two characters, Tartakovsky made Dee Dee artistic and Dexter scientific.

The names "Dexter" and "Dee Dee" were found in name books; "Dexter" caught Tartakovsky's attention for sounding scientific while "Dee Dee" appealed to him because of its uniqueness, feeling that it complemented her two pigtails. Before settling on these options, Tartakovsky had considered titling the series Dartmouth and Daisy. Explaining why he discarded this idea, Tartakovsky said that "Dartmouth doesn't exactly roll off the tongue" and that the name Daisy was already heavily associated with Disney. The title Dexter's Laboratory was settled during the production of "Changes".

The sibling dynamic in Dexter's Laboratory was partially modeled on Tartakovsky's relationship with his older brother, Alex. Comparing himself to Dee Dee and Alex, who became a computer engineer, to Dexter, Tartakovsky acknowledged that he was most likely a "pest" to his older brother while they were growing up. He also reminisced that as children, he and his brother could each be a "pain in the ass" to the other. To illustrate one of the parallels between his childhood and the series, Tartakovsky noted that Alex had kept him from playing with "intricate" toy soldiers, paralleling to Dexter attempts to keep Dee Dee away from his inventions. The ages of Dexter and Dee Dee are meant to be nebulous. Although Tartakovsky suggested that Dexter is intended to be about six to eight years old and that Dee Dee is "a couple years older", he stressed that he would "never want" to specify Dexter's exact age.

Dexter was inspired by Tartakovsky's experiences as a child immigrant in Chicago, who would often be mocked by some children for his "very thick accent". Tartakovsky noted that when he was a child, he was less confident than the character. Partially inspired by his accent as a child, Tartakovsky determined that Dexter should have an accent because the character "considers himself a very serious scientist, and all well-known scientists have accents." While developing Dexter and Dee Dee's parents as stereotypical American parents, Tartakovsky expanded their mother as a germophobe who needed to wear gloves.

Created by Tartakovsky, McCracken, and Rudish, Tartakovsky was not hoping for Dial M for Monkey to become successful nor a failure. Cartoon Network and Hanna-Barbera asked the production to create more shorts with Dexter and not Dial M for Monkey shorts unless they had "really good ideas." As they were still developing Dexter, it was deemed difficult to develop Monkey since he was a simple character. Tartakovsky's inspiration for The Justice Friends came from reading Marvel Comics while learning how to speak English. While Tartakovsky and Rudish designed the characters, they conceived them as roommates dealing with their powers. In a 2001 IGN interview, Tartakovsky expressed disappointment with how The Justice Friends turned out, commenting that "it could have been funnier and the characters could have been fleshed out more."

=== Animation and designs ===
The series was designed by Tartakovsky with assistance of McCracken and Rudish. The simplistic style was influenced by the UPA shorts and the animated short film The Dover Boys at Pimento University. Other influences and styles contributed to the series include Hanna-Barbera, Warner Bros. Cartoons, and Japanese animation. While developing Dexter's Laboratory, Tartakovsky utilized limited animation by designing the noses and mouths in the style of Hanna-Barbera.

Combining with a lot of influences, Tartakovsky experimented with many techniques that are uncommon to the UPA shorts and Hanna-Barbera cartoons, such as staging the laboratory scenes for depth of its actions and gags; adding comedy to its actions; expanding though variable shots and pacing; and giving Dexter's personality traits "more character and real emotion." Influenced by director Robert Cannon's character movements and timing, Tartakovsky was inspired to replicate its movements with Dexter and Dee Dee by animating their distinctive movements and timing. Other influences for timing include the styles of Bob Clampett, Chuck Jones, and live action films.

== Reception ==
Dexter was a featured character at the Macy's Thanksgiving Day Parade from 1998 to 2000.

Upon its debut, Dexter's Laboratory garnered a 3.5 Nielsen rating with a delivery of 12 million viewers, becoming the highest-rated What a Cartoon! short on Cartoon Network. Throughout the series' run, it was Cartoon Network's highest-rated original series in 1996 and 1997 and developed a large adult audience. The series was part of Cartoon Network's 20 percent ratings surge during mid-1999. As of 2003, Dexter's Laboratory averaged nearly 1.4 million viewers aged two to eleven per episode, tying with Codename: Kids Next Door as the most successful Cartoon Network show for June 2003. Alongside The Powerpuff Girls, Dexter's Laboratory helped increase Cartoon Network’s ratings in the late 1990s and early 2000s.

Cartoon Network viewers voted the series as "Toon of the Year" in 1996. In April 1997, Dexter's Laboratory was awarded a Silver Pulcinella for Best Script at the Cartoons on the Bay animation festival in Italy. From 1998 to 2000, a Dexter balloon was featured in Macy's Thanksgiving Day Parade alongside other iconic characters, including the titular piglet from Babe whom Christine Cavanaugh also voiced.

=== Critical response ===
Dexter's Laboratory received acclaim from critics. Shortly after the premiere of its first season, Dexter's Laboratory was hailed as one of the best new series on Cartoon Network by Ted Cox of the Daily Herald. Arion Berger of LA Weekly praised the series as "simple, compact, perfectly timed, and pristinely drawn." Louise Leger of The Globe and Mail lauded the "clever dialogue" and commented that "off-the-wall fun ensues, all to the steady patter of sibling bickering." In the lead up to its second season, Dexter's Laboratory was referred as the most imaginative series on Cartoon Network by Nancy McAlister of The Florida Times-Union. (Note: Writing in 1997, McAlister mistakenly claimed that Dexter's Laboratory was about to start its third season; the series was actually about to start its second season, which would mark its third year on television.) Although McAlister critiqued the gender stereotyping of Dexter's parents, she acknowledged that she was only applying such scrutiny to the series because Dexter's Laboratory had helped convince her that "viewers should take animated programming seriously". Newsday's Diane Wertz called the series "smart" and "culture-conscious".

In his 2015 book Animation: A World History Volume III: Contemporary Times, Giannalberto Bendazzi called Dexter's Laboratory "visually and verbally innovative". He considered the series to be a groundbreaking work of pop art, likening its visual style to both street art and the designs of Takashi Murakami. David Perlmutter wrote in his 2018 book The Encyclopedia of American Animated Television Shows that all three segments of Dexter's Laboratory elevate stereotypical ideas through an approach that contains "verve and originality". He highlighted the staging of action sequences throughout the series and wrote that Dexter's Laboratory is "much more effective (and funny) than it would have been under a director less committed to the project [than Tartakovsky]."

Critics ranked Dexter's Laboratory as one of the best cartoons in various lists. In 1997, Bill Ward of the Minnesota Star Tribune named Dexter's Laboratory to his Critic's Choice list, recommending it for the "young of all ages". In 2009, Dexter's Laboratory was ranked at number 72 for the IGN's "Best Animated TV Series" list whose editors remarked "Aimed at and immediately accessible to children, Dexter's Laboratory was part of a new generation of animated series that played on two levels, simultaneously fun for both kids and adults." In 2012, Entertainment Weekly ranked Dexter's Laboratory fourth in its list of "10 Best Cartoon Network Shows".

=== Legacy ===
As affirmed by Giannalberto Bendazzi in Animation: A World History Volume III, Dexter's Laboratory, along with Craig McCracken's The Powerpuff Girls, helped define the style of Cartoon Network, both for being works "in which lines and colour are predominant", and for underlining their graphic aspect through limited animation. Television critic Robert Lloyd claimed that both artists were "at the forefront of a second wave of innovative, creator-driven television animation, whose first wave began in the 1990s with the likes of Ralph Bakshi's Mighty Mouse: The New Adventures and John Kricfalusi's The Ren & Stimpy Show." Tartakovsky reflected on this period in 2024, saying that he and his colleagues took full advantage of the freedom provided by the still-new Cartoon Network, but that the level of trust on young artists was "pretty much gone" 30 years later.

The show has been credited for kick-starting the channel's ascent, with Mike Lazzo calling Tartakovsky "an architect of the success of the Cartoon Network", after Dexter's success. It is also responsible for launching Tartakovsky's career, which later gave way to Samurai Jack and Star Wars: Clone Wars. To this, Gizmodo's Beth Elderkin added: "Since then, he's become a staple in children's and adult animation, responsible for everything from the Hotel Transylvania series to the powerful (and ultra-violent) Primal." Vulture called the first pilot episode "a testament to Tartakovsky's talent and commitment as a filmmaker and a proof of concept for the What a Cartoon! anthology format." For a while, the show's simplistic look was adopted by other American cartoons; in a 2021 interview with Syfy Wire, animator Butch Hartman said, "When I started making Fairly OddParents, I took cues from what Genndy did in terms of simplifying the designs and using bold colors and simple shapes."

Dexter's Laboratory has been subject to scholarly works that include a study on post-9/11 America by Media International Australia and a publication about how Mexican children react to references in the series by Comunicar.

In 2023, Tartakovsky stated that he was uninterested in attempting to reboot Dexter's Laboratory due to Cavanaugh's death in 2014, as well as the "overabundance" of recent reboots of cartoons. He later joked in 2025 that he would revive the series if his career declines.

=== Awards and nominations ===
Award	Date of ceremony	Category	Recipient(s)	Result	Ref.
Annie Awards	November 11, 1995	Best Animated Short Subject	Hanna-Barbera (for "Changes")	Won	
Annie Awards	November 11, 1995	Best Individual Achievement for Storyboarding in the Field of Animation	Genndy Tartakovsky	Nominated	
Annie Awards	November 16, 1997	Best Individual Achievement: Writing in a TV Production	Jason Butler Rote and Paul Rudish (for "Beard to Be Feared")	Won	
Annie Awards	November 16, 1997	Best Animated TV Program	Hanna-Barbera	Nominated	
Annie Awards	November 16, 1997	Best Individual Achievement: Music in a TV Production	Thomas Chase and Steve Rucker	Nominated	
Annie Awards	November 16, 1997	Best Individual Achievement: Producing in a TV Production	Genndy Tartakovsky (for "Ham Hocks and Arm Locks")	Nominated	
Annie Awards	November 16, 1997	Best Individual Achievement: Voice Acting by a Female Performer in a TV Production	Christine Cavanaugh (as Dexter)	Nominated	
Annie Awards	November 13, 1998	Outstanding Achievement in an Animated Primetime or Late Night Television Program	Hanna-Barbera	Nominated	
Annie Awards	November 13, 1998	Outstanding Individual Achievement for Voice Acting by a Female Performer in an Animated Television Production	Christine Cavanaugh (as Dexter)	Nominated	
Annie Awards	November 13, 1998	Outstanding Individual Achievement for Music in an Animated Television Production	David Smith, Thomas Chase, and Steve Rucker (for "LABretto")	Nominated	
Annie Awards	November 11, 2000	Outstanding Achievement in a Primetime or Late Night Animated Television Program	Hanna-Barbera	Nominated	
Annie Awards	November 11, 2000	Outstanding Individual Achievement for Voice Acting by a Female Performer in an Animated Television Production	Christine Cavanaugh (as Dexter in Dexter's Laboratory: Ego Trip)	Won	
Golden Reel Awards	March 21, 1998	Best Sound Editing in Television Animation – Music	Dexter's Laboratory	Nominated	
Golden Reel Awards	March 23, 2002	Best Sound Editing in Television – Music, Episodic Animation	Roy Braverman and William Griggs (for "Momdark", "Quackor", and "Mind Over Chatter")	Nominated	
Golden Reel Awards	February 28, 2004	Best Sound Editing in Television Animation – Music	Brian F. Mars and Roy Braverman (for "Dexter's Wacky Races")	Nominated	
Online Film & Television Association Awards	1998	Best Animated Series	Dexter's Laboratory	Nominated	
Online Film & Television Association Awards	1998	Best Cable Series	Dexter's Laboratory	Nominated	
Online Film & Television Association Awards	1998	Best Writing in a Cable Series	Dexter's Laboratory	Nominated	
Online Film & Television Association Awards	1999	Best Animated Series	Dexter's Laboratory	Nominated	
Online Film & Television Association Awards	1999	Best Voice-Over Performance	Christine Cavanaugh (as Dexter)	Won	
Primetime Emmy Awards	1995 (Primetime Creative Arts Emmy Awards)	Outstanding Animated Program (for Programming One Hour or Less)	Buzz Potamkin, Genndy Tartakovsky, and Larry Huber (for "Changes")	Nominated	
Primetime Emmy Awards	1996 (Primetime Creative Arts Emmy Awards)	Outstanding Animated Program (for Programming One Hour or Less)	Larry Huber, Genndy Tartakovsky, Craig McCracken, and Paul Rudish (for "The Big Sister")	Nominated	
Primetime Emmy Awards	1997 (Primetime Creative Arts Emmy Awards)	Outstanding Animated Program (for Programming One Hour or Less)	Sherry Gunther, Larry Huber, Craig McCracken, Genndy Tartakovsky, and Jason Butler Rote (for "Star Spangled Sidekicks", "TV Super Pals", and "Game Over")	Nominated	
Primetime Emmy Awards	1998 (Primetime Creative Arts Emmy Awards)	Outstanding Animated Program (for Programming One Hour or Less)	Davis Doi, Genndy Tartakovsky, Jason Butler Rote, and Michael Ryan (for "Dyno-might" and "LABretto")	Nominated	

== Merchandise ==
=== Home media ===
Dexter's Laboratory debuted in home media as a "bonus toon" on the Jonny Quest - Race Bannon in Army of One VHS. (Note: Includes What a Cartoon! short Dexter's Laboratory.) Home media for the series began with the Dexter's Laboratory: Volume 1 VHS in the United Kingdom in 2000 and the Dexter's Laboratory: Greatest Adventures VHS in North America in 2001. The made-for-television movie Ego Trip was released exclusively on VHS in North America in 2000 and in the United Kingdom in 2001.

Madman Entertainment released season one and part of season two on Region 4 DVD in 2008. A Region 1 DVD release of season one was released by Warner Home Video on October 12, 2010. As of 2015, Dexter's Laboratory was available on Hulu. Dexter's Laboratory: The Complete Series was released on DVD in North America on June 25, 2024, by Warner Bros. Home Entertainment and includes all episodes along with the television film Ego Trip except for "Dial M for Monkey: Barbequor" and "Rude Removal". Every episode, except for the television film Ego Trip and the banned "Rude Removal" episode, is available on iTunes. Dexter's Laboratory is available on Apple TV, Amazon Prime Video, Google Play, and Tubi.

Dexter's Laboratory home media releases
Season	Title	Format	Release dates		
Season	Title	Format	Region 1	Region 2	Region 4
1	Jonny Quest - Race Bannon in Army of One (Note: Included on home media as part of a compilation or as a bonus cartoon instead of a feature.)	VHS	March 19, 1996	—N/a	—N/a
1	Dexter's Laboratory: Volume 1	VHS	—N/a	March 27, 2000	—N/a
1	Cartoon Network Halloween 2 - Grossest Halloween Ever	DVD	August 9, 2005	—N/a	—N/a
1	Dexter's Laboratory: The Complete First Season	DVD	October 12, 2010	—N/a	February 13, 2008
1	4 Kid Favorites Cartoon Network: Hall of Fame #1	DVD	March 13, 2012	—N/a	—N/a
1	4 Kid Favorites Cartoon Network: Hall of Fame #3	DVD	June 23, 2015	—N/a	—N/a
1	Dexter's Laboratory: Collected Experiments	DVD	—N/a	—N/a	October 25, 2017
1	Dexter's Laboratory: The Complete Series	DVD	June 25, 2024	—N/a	—N/a
2	The Powerpuff Girls: Twisted Sister	VHS	April 3, 2001	—N/a	—N/a
2	Dexter's Laboratory: Greatest Adventures	VHS	July 3, 2001	—N/a	—N/a
2	The Powerpuff Girls: 'Twas the Fight Before Christmas	DVD	October 7, 2003	—N/a	November 8, 2005
2	The Powerpuff Girls: 'Twas the Fight Before Christmas	VHS	October 7, 2003	—N/a	November 8, 2005
2	Scooby-Doo and the Toon Tour of Mysteries	DVD	June 2004	—N/a	—N/a
2	Cartoon Network Halloween - Nine Creepy Cartoon Capers	DVD	August 10, 2004	—N/a	—N/a
2	Cartoon Network Christmas - Yuletide Follies	DVD	October 5, 2004	—N/a	—N/a
2	Cartoon Network Christmas 2 - Christmas Rocks	DVD	October 4, 2005	October 18, 2010	—N/a
2	Dexter's Laboratory: Season 2; Part 1	DVD	—N/a	—N/a	June 11, 2008
2	Dexter's Laboratory: Collected Experiments	DVD	—N/a	—N/a	October 25, 2017
2	Dexter's Laboratory: The Complete Series	DVD	June 25, 2024	—N/a	—N/a
Film	Dexter's Laboratory: Ego Trip	VHS	November 7, 2000	July 23, 2001	—N/a
Film	Dexter's Laboratory: Collected Experiments	DVD	—N/a	—N/a	October 25, 2017
Film	Dexter's Laboratory: The Complete Series	DVD	June 25, 2024	—N/a	—N/a
3	Dexter's Laboratory: Collected Experiments	DVD	—N/a	—N/a	October 25, 2017
3	Dexter's Laboratory: The Complete Series	DVD	June 25, 2024	—N/a	—N/a
4	The Powerpuff Girls Movie	DVD	November 5, 2002	—N/a	—N/a
4	The Powerpuff Girls Movie	VHS	November 5, 2002	—N/a	—N/a
4	Dexter's Laboratory: Collected Experiments	DVD	—N/a	—N/a	October 25, 2017
4	Dexter's Laboratory: The Complete Series	DVD	June 25, 2024	—N/a	—N/a

=== Music releases ===
Three Dexter's Laboratory tracks are featured on Cartoon Network's 1999 compilation album Cartoon Medley. The Musical Time Machine is a soundtrack album released in 1998 through Rhino Records. The Hip-Hop Experiment is a compilation album released on August 20, 2002, on CD and limited-edition green vinyl record through Kid Rhino and Atlantic Records. The music videos for "Dexter (What's My Name?)", "Secrets", and "Back to the Lab" aired in August 2002 on Cartoon Network.

=== Publications ===
Characters from Dexter's Laboratory are featured in a 150,000-print magazine called Cartoon Network, published by Burghley Publishing and released in the United Kingdom on August 27, 1998. On February 25, 2013, IDW Publishing announced a partnership with Cartoon Network to produce comics based on its properties, which included Dexter's Laboratory.

=== Toys and promotions ===
Wendy's promoted Dexter's Laboratory with five collectible toys in their kids' meals from mid-October to November 23, 1997. Discovery Zone sponsored Cartoon Network's eight-week-long "Dexter's Duplication Summer" in 1998 to promote the series' new schedule. NASCAR's 1999 "Wacky Racing Team" vehicle driven by Jerry Nadeau in the Daytona 500 featured Dexter's Laboratory characters on its paint. Subway promoted Dexter's Laboratory from April 1 to May 15, 2002, with four kids' meal toys.

Dairy Queen sold six kids' meal toys during an April 2001 promotion that was financed by a $3 million advertising and marketing budget. That month, Perfetti Van Melle and Cartoon Network launched the "Out of Control" promotion, which included on-air marketing and a sweepstakes to win an "Air Dextron" entertainment center. The following April, a promotion featured Dexter's Laboratory-themed Airheads packs and an online sweepstakes. Two board games Race to the Brainergizer and The Incredible Invention Versus Dee Dee were released by Pressman Toy Corporation in 2001.

=== Video games ===
Six Dexter's Laboratory video games have been released: Robot Rampage for the Nintendo Game Boy Color, Chess Challenge and Deesaster Strikes! for the Nintendo Game Boy Advance, Mandark's Lab? for the Sony PlayStation, Dexter's Laboratory: Science Ain't Fair for PC, and Dexter's Laboratory: Security Alert! for mobile phones. A Dexter's Laboratory combat-style action video game on PlayStation 2 and Nintendo GameCube was going to be developed by n-Space, published by BAM! Entertainment, and distributed in Europe by Acclaim Entertainment for a 2004 release, but it was canceled. Dexter's Laboratory characters are featured in Cartoon Network Racing and Cartoon Network: Punch Time Explosion. Elements from Dexter's Laboratory are featured in the 2024 Warner Bros. game MultiVersus.

== See also ==
- List of fictional scientists and engineers
- List of works produced by Hanna-Barbera
- List of Hanna-Barbera characters
