= Dexter's Laboratory: Ego Trip =

1999 animated television film directed by Genndy Tartakovsky

- Promotional release poster
- Created by: Genndy Tartakovsky
- Based on: Dexter's Laboratory by Genndy Tartakovsky
- Story by: Chris Savino; Amy Keating Rogers; John McIntyre; Craig McCracken; Paul Rudish; Genndy Tartakovsky
- Directed by: Genndy Tartakovsky
- Voices of: Christine Cavanaugh; Eddie Deezen; Jeff Bennett; Kath Soucie; Kat Cressida; Tom Kenny
- Composers: Thomas Chase; Steve Rucker
- Country of origin: United States
- Original language: English

Production
- Running time: 50 minutes
- Production company: Hanna-Barbera Cartoons

Original release
- Network: Cartoon Network
- Release: December 10, 1999

Dexter's Laboratory: Ego Trip is a 1999 American animated science fiction comedy television film based on the animated television series Dexter's Laboratory. It was produced by Hanna-Barbera Cartoons and originally aired on December 10, 1999, on Cartoon Network. The film follows Dexter, the series' titular protagonist, as he travels forward through time and meets futuristic versions of himself and his rival Mandark.

While made for television, the film is the directorial debut of series creator Genndy Tartakovsky and was originally intended to be a stand alone, one off television special before the series was revived in 2001. Ego Trip was the first Cartoon Network television movie produced, and is the final Dexter's Laboratory installment to be animated using traditional cel animation. It also marked one of the final performances of Christine Cavanaugh as Dexter before her retirement from voice acting; Candi Milo would replace her during the third season of the series.

== Plot ==
In the present day, Dexter's rival Mandark attempts to steal Dexter's invention, the Neurotomic Protocore. Mandark is thwarted by Dexter, who then returns to work in his lab. After being annoyed by his sister Dee Dee, he tells her to go away, leading her to inadvertently enter a time machine in the lab. Mysterious robots enter Dexter's lab through the same time machine. Dexter immediately destroys the robots. Believing that he is "The One Who Saved the Future" that the robots spoke of, Dexter decides to travel through time to discover how "cool" he becomes.

However, he finds that his future young adult self is weak-willed and subordinated by Mandark, now a corporate boss. Dexter finds the Neurotomic Protocore stored in a box inside the cubicle. He convinces his young adult self to travel with him further into the future to find out how they save it. They leave the Neurotomic Protocore sitting on the floor of the cubicle. Further into the future, they discover a utopian society where Dexter is revered as an omnipotent leader, and Mandark has been reduced to a brain in a jar. When they meet their senior self, he is too old and senile to remember how the future was "saved". The three of them travel back in time to the period between Dexter's corporate life and his utopian leadership. They discover a dystopian society where humans have no intelligence and live in ruin. When drone robots threaten the lives of the citizens and Dexters, they are saved by the fourth Dexter who is muscular, bearded, and quick-witted.

They learn that Mandark is responsible for this dystopia after he finds the Neurotomic Protocore in the cubicle. They use the ruins of Dexter's laboratory and build a giant robot in pursuit of taking down Mandark's reign. Mandark is prepared with his equivalent counterparts from other timelines to fight the Dexters in a 4-on-4 battle. Weighed down by every boy genius' counterpart, child Dexter cannot reach the switch that turns the Neurotomic Protocore's output from negative to positive. During this struggle, Dee Dee materializes in the room via time machine. She obliviously presses the correct button that saves the future, defeating the Mandarks in the process. This angers the Dexters, as they wanted to be the ones to save the future. They build the robots that are seen at the beginning, intended to destroy Dee Dee (although they do not specifically mention her by name and order them to destroy "The One Who Saved the Future").

Child Dexter bids farewell to his future selves and returns to his own time period to find himself fighting the same robots that he just built, discovering that he has created a causal loop. Confused by time travel, he gives up and gets himself something to eat.

== Release ==
Ego Trip first aired on Cartoon Network on December 10, 1999, and re-aired on New Year's Day 2000. The film re-aired as part of Cartoon Network's "Leap Year Time Travel Day" marathon on February 29, 2004. It was eventually seen on Boomerang in the 2010s.

The special was released on VHS & Video CD in Region 1 on November 7, 2000, and VHS in Region 2 on July 23, 2001. The VHS also includes the episodes "The Justice Friends: Krunk's Date" and "Dial M for Monkey: Rasslor". The film is included in the region 4 DVD release Dexter's Laboratory: Collected Experiments.

In a 2022 interview with Polygon, director Genndy Tartakovsky commented on the television film's scarcity, stating, "I don't think people know about it, honestly. Like, as far as the people who run HBO Max and Cartoon Network, I don't think it's been on their radar since we released it." In December 2022, Ego Trip was made available on Amazon Prime Video.

The film is included on the Region 1 DVD release for the complete series, which released on June 25, 2024.

== Reception ==
Marc Bernardin of Entertainment Weekly called Ego Trip "drawn-out", saying that Dexter's Laboratory does not do as well in an hour-long format as it does in normal television episodes. Christine Cavanaugh, the voice actor for Dexter, received an Annie Award in 2000 for the category "Outstanding Individual Achievement for Voice Acting by a Female Performer in an Animated Television Production" for her role in the movie.
