= Kat Cressida =

American actress

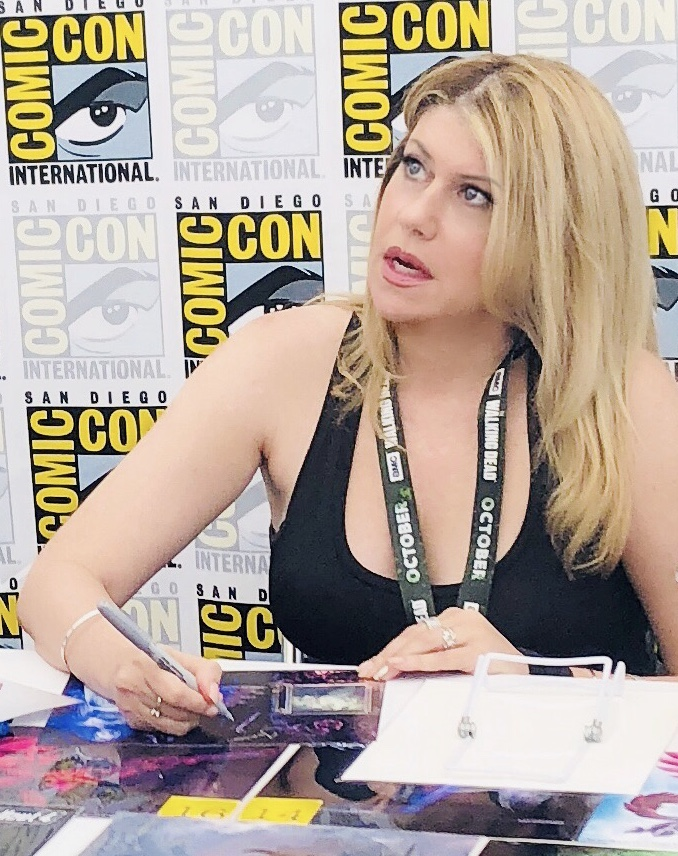
- Cressida in 2018
- Education: University of California, Berkeley
- Occupation: Actress
- Years active: 1993–present
- Website: www.katcressida.com

Kat Cressida (/ˈkrɛsɪdə/) is an American actress whose credits include voicing the character Dee Dee on the animated television series Dexter's Laboratory, as well as playing the Bride in The Haunted Mansion at the Disneyland Resort and Walt Disney World Resort. She also voiced Bloody Mary in the video game The Wolf Among Us.

== Early career ==
Cressida guest-starred in several television shows and theatre productions, such as Loco Motives and made her feature film debut in The Long Way Home, before starting her voice acting career in 2000.

== Voice acting ==
Cressida has voiced Jessie from Toy Story in various Disney projects, serving as a voice double for Joan Cusack. She is best known for voicing Dee Dee in seasons 2 and 4 of the Cartoon Network series Dexter's Laboratory, Uta in the F/X series Archer and the Bride in Disneyland and Disney World's The Haunted Mansion theme parks. She is also noted for being the first woman to do live announcing for ESPN's coverage of the 2010 NFL draft, as well as announcing for several other shows for ESPN, NBC Sports, and Versus. She can also be heard in other attractions throughout the Disney Parks, including The Twilight Zone Tower of Terror, Toy Story Midway Mania!, and Epcot Character Spot. She was the first voice actress to narrate for WatchMojo.com and has also made appearances in video games, including Marvel Heroes, Guild Wars 2, Fallout 4, Mirror's Edge, Master of Orion, The Elder Scrolls, Star Trek Online, EverQuest, Titan Quest, Dragon Age, and World of Warcraft, among others. She is represented by Cool Water Productions and Talent for Cons, a booking agent for fan conventions such as San Diego Comic-Con.

== Public speaking ==
Cressida is also a public speaker. She shared her story about being diagnosed with Dermatofibrosarcoma protuberans in 2012 and the subsequent two years of life-threatening surgeries and specialized treatment she went through in order to re-learn how to speak so she could continue her career. She has since spoken to audiences who are amidst their own recoveries from cancer, healing from PTSD and overcoming speech disabilities.

== Education ==
Cressida graduated from the University of California, Berkeley.

== Filmography ==
=== Animation ===
- Archer – Uta
- Dexter's Laboratory – additional voices (seasons 1-4), Dee Dee (seasons 2-4)
- Jackie Chan Adventures – Portia, Various
- Jellystone! – Dee Dee
- Phineas and Ferb – Additional Voices
- The Powerpuff Girls – Additional voices

=== Anime ===
- Initial D – Natsuki "Natalie" Mogi (English dub)
- Tales from Earthsea – Additional Voices
- The Cat Returns – Additional Voices

=== Film ===
- Dexter's Laboratory: Ego Trip – Dee Dee
- Khumba – Cheerleader Zebra #2
- Piper Penguin and his Fantastic Flying Machines – Penny
- Tarzan – Kala (Gorilla Vocal Effects)
- Tinker Bell – Mrs. Darling
- Whispers: An Elephant's Tale – Princess

=== Live-action ===
- Babylon 5 – Kat the Bartender
- Diagnosis: Murder – Iris, Production Coordinator, Louisa Romero
- Judging Amy – Additional Voices
- M.A.N.T.I.S. – Brenda
- Murder, She Wrote – Darlene Farber
- The Long Way Home – Herself
- VH1 Goes Inside – Herself

=== Video games ===
- Batman: Arkham Knight – Additional Voices
- Buffy the Vampire Slayer: Chaos Bleeds – Additional Voices
- Cartoon Network Racing – Dee Dee
- Cookie Run: Kingdom – Tarte Tatin Cookie (English dub)
- Dark Deception – Agatha, The Matron
- Disney Infinity series – Jessie
- Epic Seven – Yufine, Charlotte, Kluri
- EverQuest II – Slaver Brona, Mirini, Tullo Domna, Irian, Zatzy, Thayare Faystrider, Innurae V'Tarris, Nashii, Eireneith Alannia, Luvile Binlee, Soly Gatherall, Doralis Covecrasher, Generic Female Troll Merchant, Generic Female Dark Elf Merchant, Generic Female Dwarf Merchant, Generic Female Froglok Merchant, Generic Female Ratonga Merchant, Generic Female Troll Merchant, Generic Female Barbarian Merchant, Generic Female Barbarian Enemy, Generic Female High Elf Enemy
- Fallout 4 – Scribe Neriah, Geneva
- Fallout 76: Wastelanders – Blood Eagles
- Fantastic Four – Additional Voices
- FusionFall - Dee Dee
- Kinect: Disneyland Adventures – Constance Hatchaway
- Madagascar – Little Girl, Woman, Lemur, Mom
- Marvel Heroes – Elektra
- Marvel Ultimate Alliance 3: The Black Order – Elektra
- Master of Orion: Conquer the Stars – Mrrshan Empress
- Quake 4 – Computer, Pilot VO
- Rage 2 – Eden AI, MBTV Worker, Vineland Wallrat
- Ratchet & Clank Future: A Crack in Time – Cassiopeia
- Shark Tale – Additional Voices
- Skylanders: SuperChargers – Scratch
- Skylanders: Swap Force – Scratch
- Spider-Man: Friend or Foe – The Computer
- Star Wars: Droid Works – Holocam-E / "Cammy"
- The Hobbit – Additional Voices
- The Thing – Computer
- The Wolf Among Us – Bloody Mary
- Titan Quest: Immortal Throne – Oracle
- True Crime: New York City – Additional voices
- Vampire: The Masquerade – Bloodlines – Additional voices, Venus Dare
- Van Helsing – Aleera
- X-Men Legends – Debra Owens, Computer Voice #1

=== Other ===
- A Bug's Life – Narrator (Disney's Storyteller series)
- Disney on Ice – Jessie
- Disney Live – Jessie
- ESPN (Pardon the Interruption, World Series of Poker, NFL draft)
- The Haunted Mansion – The Bride
- The Twilight Zone Tower of Terror – Little Girl Lost
- Toy Story Midway Mania! – Jessie
