= Sherry Gunther =

American television producer

Sherry Gunther is an American television producer known for her work in animation. While at Klasky Csupo, Gunther worked on the television series Duckman, Rugrats, and early seasons of The Simpsons, for which she won a Primetime Emmy Award in 1991.

== Career ==
Gunther served in various production roles in animation before being elected senior vice president of production at Hanna-Barbera Cartoons in 1995. Under Hanna-Barbera President Fred Seibert, she oversaw production of Turner Entertainment programs such as Dexter's Laboratory, Johnny Bravo, The Real Adventures of Jonny Quest and the World Premiere Toons. She then went on to produce Family Guy and to found 20th Television's first in-house prime-time animation studio. She produced prime-time pilots for Imagine Television, Touchstone Television, 20th Television, Fox and Carsey Warner as well as theatrical Looney Tunes shorts for Warner Bros.

Aside from her animation and media career, Gunther became a serial entrepreneur in 2007, founding companies in digital media content, social gaming, toys, and multi-platform brands. Gunther is currently the founder and CEO of POPmedia Brands, Inc., a media company focusing on creating, developing, and producing media brands anchored in television series and animation, with digital and toy extensions. The company is in active development on The Beatrix Girls brand, which she created and launched in mass retail music and YouTube in 2013.

Sherry is also an adjunct professor at the University of Southern California, at the Marshall School of Business, teaching graduate level classes through the Lloyd Greif Center for Entrepreneurship, focused on Entrepreneurship in the Media and Entertainment Industry. She is also a frequent speaker at industry conferences such as Digital kids, Digital Hollywood, and Internet Marketing Association.

== Personal life ==
Gunther earned a Bachelor of Science degree from the University of California, Los Angeles, and a Master of Business Administration degree from the University of Southern California. She speaks four languages fluently. She has two children, and lives in Calabasas, California, with her husband Ken.

== Filmography ==
Year	Title	Role	Notes
1986	The Glo Friends	Production assistant	TV series
1987	Mighty Mouse: The New Adventures	Production manager; talent coordinator	TV series; 7 episodes
1988	Oliver & Company	Assistant production manager	Feature Film
1989	Hound Town	Executive in charge of production	TV movie
1989	The Butter Battle Book	Production supervisor	TV short
1989–92	The Simpsons	Animation production manager; animation producer	TV series; 61 episodes
1990	Do the Bartman	Animation producer	Music video
1991–94	Rugrats	Supervising producer; executive in charge of production	TV series; 65 episodes
1993	Recycle Rex	Producer	Animated short
1994	Edith Ann: Homeless Go Home	Producer	TV movie
1994–95	Duckman	Producer	TV series; 22 episodes
1995	Dumb and Dumber	Executive producer	TV series
1995–97	What a Cartoon!	Senior vice president of production; executive producer	Animated shorts showcase series
1996	Cave Kids	Executive producer	TV series; 1 episode
1996–97	The Real Adventures of Jonny Quest	Senior vice president of production	TV series; 52 episodes
1996–2003	Dexter's Laboratory	Senior vice president of production; executive producer	TV series; 33 episodes
1997–99	I Am Weasel	Executive producer	TV series; 17 episodes
1998	Scooby-Doo on Zombie Island	Executive producer	Film
1997	Johnny Bravo	Executive producer	TV series; Season 1
1999–2003	Family Guy	Producer	TV series; 37 episodes
2002	Globehunters: An Around the World in 80 Days Adventure	Executive producer	Movie
2002	3-South	Producer	TV series; 1 episode
2003	The Electric Piper	Executive producer	TV movie
2003	Whizzard of Ow	Producer	Animated short
2003	Museum Scream	Producer	Animated short
2004	Cock-A-Doodle Duel	Producer	Animated short
2004	Duck Dodgers in Attack of the Drones	Producer	Animated TV short
2004	My Generation G... G... Gap	Producer	Animated short
2004	Hare and Loathing in Las Vegas	Producer	Animated short
2006	The Roaches	Executive producer	TV series
2007–2008	ZooKazoo.com	Creator/Executive Producer	Online Virtual World
2009–2010	MyMiniPeeps.com	Creator/Executive Producer	3D MMOG Social Game Virtual World
2012–2017	The Beatrix Girls	Creator/Executive Producer	Webisodes, Original Music, Fashion Dolls, Media Brand
2024	Twilight of the Gods	Producer	TV series

== Accolades ==
Gunther won a Primetime Emmy Award for her work on The Simpsons in 1991. She has received four additional Primetime Emmy nominations, Festival Awards, a Daytime Emmy Award, two CableACE Award nominations, and a Humanitas Prize.
