= Christine Cavanaugh =

American actress (1963–2014)

- Cavanaugh in 1992
- Born: Christine Josephine Sandberg; August 16, 1963; Layton, Utah, U.S.
- Died: December 22, 2014 (aged 51); Cedar City, Utah, U.S.
- Education: Utah State University; University of Hawaiʻi
- Occupations: Actress; voice actress
- Years active: 1988–2003
- Spouse: Kevin James Cavanaugh (m. 1985; div. 1988)

Christine Josephine Cavanaugh (née Sandberg; August 16, 1963 – December 22, 2014) was an American actress known for her distinctive speaking style and for providing the voice for a large range of mostly cartoon characters. She was the original voices of Chuckie Finster in Nickelodeon's Rugrats and the titular protagonists of both Cartoon Network's Dexter's Laboratory and Universal Pictures' live-action film Babe respectively, as well as the voices of Gosalyn Mallard in Disney's Darkwing Duck, Bunnie Rabbot from DIC Entertainment's Sonic the Hedgehog television series, Marty Sherman in The Critic and Oblina in Nickelodeon's Aaahh!!! Real Monsters.

Cavanaugh retired from voice acting and public life in general in 2001, although some media with her contributions continued to be released until 2003. She died at age 51 on December 22, 2014, at her home in Cedar City, Utah.

== Early life ==
Christine Josephine Sandberg was born in Layton, Utah, on August 16, 1963, to Waldo Eugene Sandberg and Reta Mason. At the age of 15, she was adopted by Kirt and Linda Johnson, whom she considered her parents for the rest of her life. Cavanaugh was a member of the Church of Jesus Christ of Latter-day Saints. She graduated from Layton High School in 1981.

== Career ==
In 1991, Cavanaugh began voicing Gosalyn Mallard, the titular character's adoptive daughter on Disney's Darkwing Duck as well as Chuckie Finster on Nickelodeon's Rugrats and later in 1994, Oblina on Aaahh!!! Real Monsters.

Cavanaugh could also be heard on The Critic as the voice of Marty, the son of Jay Sherman (voiced by Jon Lovitz). Her voice credits also include the animated series Sonic the Hedgehog, 101 Dalmatians: The Series, Hercules: The Animated Series, The Powerpuff Girls, The Wild Thornberrys and Disney's Recess, as well as the voice of Birdie in The Wacky Adventures of Ronald McDonald.

In 1995, Cavanaugh lent her voice to the live-action film Babe in the starring role of its titular protagonist. She was offered to reprise her role for the sequel, Babe: Pig in the City, but decided against it when contract negotiations fell through, so the role was instead played by her Rugrats co-star Elizabeth Daily. Also in 1995, Cavanaugh began voicing the eponymous character of Dexter's Laboratory, which began as a short under Cartoon Network's What a Cartoon! anthology show and became the first short to be adapted into its own series for the channel. She later won a 2000 Annie Award for her voice performances in the TV movie Dexter's Laboratory: Ego Trip. Cavanaugh also guest starred on several TV shows including Salute Your Shorts, Cheers, Empty Nest, Wings, The X-Files, Everybody Loves Raymond, and ER, and had supporting roles in the feature films Soulmates and Jerry Maguire.

Cavanaugh retired from voice acting in 2001 to spend more time with family, although some TV episodes and films with her recordings continued to be released until 2003. After her retirement, she was replaced by Candi Milo on Dexter's Laboratory and by Nancy Cartwright, her co-star in The Critic, as the voice of Chuckie in the Rugrats franchise.

== Death and legacy ==
On December 22, 2014, Cavanaugh died at her home in Cedar City, Utah, at the age of 51. According to the reference book Resting Places: The Burial Sites of More Than 14,000 Famous Persons, Third Edition, she reportedly died from leukemia. She was cremated, and her ashes were scattered into the Great Salt Lake.

Cavanaugh's legacy was acknowledged by Genndy Tartakovsky, the creator of Dexter's Laboratory, as he cited her death as one of the factors in his refusal to create a revival of the show.

== Filmography ==
=== Voice roles ===
Year	Work	Role	Notes
1988	David and the Magic Pearl	David	English dub
1991–1992	Darkwing Duck	Gosalyn Mallard	73 episodes
1991–2002	Rugrats	Chuckie Finster/Chuckie's Guardian Angel, additional voices	Played Chuckie for the first 7 seasons and a few early episodes of season 8. Nancy Cartwright replaced her for the rest of the series, the Rugrats spin-off All Grown Up! and the 2021 reboot
1992	Raw Toonage	Gosalyn Mallard	
1992	Gramps	Alien Kid #2	
1992	The Secret of the Seal	Tottoi	English dub
1993	Recycle Rex	Additional voices	
1993	A Flintstone Family Christmas	Stoney	
1993–1994	Sonic the Hedgehog	Bunnie Rabbot	
1994–1997	Aaahh!!! Real Monsters	Oblina	
1994–1995	The Critic	Marty Sherman	
1994	Aladdin	Additional voices	
1994	Beethoven	Rosebud	1 episode "Cyrano De Beethoven"
1995	Babe	Babe	She was offered to reprise her role for the sequel, Babe: Pig in the City, but decided against it due to personal matters, so the role was instead played by her Rugrats co-star Elizabeth Daily.
1995	Balto	Additional voices	Uncredited
1995–1996	What a Cartoon!	Dexter, Boy, Alien kid 2	Played in 3 shorts ("Dexter's Laboratory" [later retitled "Changes"], "Gramps", and "The Big Sister").
1995–1997	Sing Me a Story with Belle	Carroll the Book Worm	
1995–1997	The New Adventures of Sheldon	Sheldon	
1996	P.J. Funnybunny: A Very Cool Easter	Ritchie Raccoon	Credited as Chris Cavanaugh
1996	The Flintstones Christmas in Bedrock	Additional voices	
1996	Nickelodeon 3D Movie Maker	Oblina	CD-Rom
1996	Cave Kids	Bamm-Bamm Rubble	
1996–2002	Dexter's Laboratory	Dexter, Additional voices	Played Dexter for the first two seasons and the first three episodes of season 3. Candi Milo played Dexter for the rest of the series.
1996–2000	Adventures from the Book of Virtues	Frog Child	
1997	101 Dalmatians: The Series	Wizzer, Dumpling	
1997	Recess	Library Kid, Digger #2, Sue Bob Murphy	
1997	Unbeatable Harry	Additional voices	
1998	Hercules: The Animated Series	Alcides	
1998	The Wacky Adventures of Ronald McDonald: Scared Silly	Birdie	Direct-to-video film
1998	Rugrats: Search for Reptar	Chuckie Finster	Video game
1998	The Powerpuff Girls	Bunny, Bud Smith	3 episodes
1998	The Rugrats Movie	Chuckie Finster	
1998	The Wild Thornberrys	Short-tailed Macaque	
1999	Dexter's Laboratory: Ego Trip	Dexter, D22, Old Man Dexter	TV film
1999	The Brothers Flub	Valerina	
1999	The Wacky Adventures of Ronald McDonald: The Legend of Grimace Island	Birdie	Direct-to-video film
1999	The Wacky Adventures of Ronald McDonald: The Visitors from Outer Space	Birdie	Direct-to-video film
1999	Rugrats: Studio Tour	Chuckie Finster	Video game
2000	Cartoon Cartoon Fridays	Dexter	
2000	Rugrats in Paris: The Movie	Chuckie Finster	
2001	The Weekenders	Tasha	
2001	Lloyd in Space	Charmaine	
2001	Rugrats: Still Babies After All These Years	Chuckie Finster	TV documentary
2001	Rugrats: All Growed Up!	Chuckie Finster	TV film
2001	The Wacky Adventures of Ronald McDonald: Birthday World	Birdie	Direct-to-video film
2001	The Wacky Adventures of Ronald McDonald: Have Time, Will Travel	Birdie	Direct-to-video film
2003	The Wacky Adventures of Ronald McDonald: The Monster O' McDonaldland Loch	Birdie	Direct-to-video film; final film role

=== Live-action ===
Year	TV Series/Film	Role	Notes
1990	Cheers	Terry Gardner	Episode # 8.24: "Mr. Otis Regrets"
1991	Salute Your Shorts	Mona Tibbs	Episode # 1.12: "Ug's Girlfriend Is Coming"
1991	Empty Nest	Kimberly	Episode # 4.7: "Country Weston"
1992	Salute Your Shorts	Mona Tibbs	Episode # 2.12: "They Call Me Ms. Tibbs"
1992	Herman's Head	Martha Fitzer	Episode # 2.13: "A Charlie Brown Fitzer"
1993	Wings	Fan	Episode # 4.17: "I Love Brian"
1993	Frasier	Fast Food Worker (uncredited)	Episode # 1.10: "Oops"
1994	Wild Oats	Kathee	
1995	Down, Out & Dangerous	Leslie McCoy	TV film
1995	Night Stand with Dick Dietrick	Kathy	Episode # 1.15: "One-Night Stand Reunions"
1996	Little Surprises	Pepper	TV film
1996	Jerry Maguire	Mrs. Remo	Credited as Christina Cavanaugh
1997	Delivery	Bridgette	
1997	Soulmates	Anna Weisland	
1997	The X-Files	Amanda Nelligan	Episode # 4.20: "Small Potatoes"
1997	Everybody Loves Raymond	Erin	Episode # 2.12: "All I Want for Christmas"
1998	You Lucky Dog	Bernice	TV film
2000	ER	Gloria	Episode # 7.3: "Mars Attacks"
