= Cartoon Medley =

Compilation album by various artists
- Released: July 6, 1999
- Genre: Soundtrack
- Length: 35:47
- Label: Kid Rhino; Atlantic Records
- Producer: Craig Kallman; Phil Baron; Don Kitabayashi

Cartoon Medley is a compilation album produced by Kid Rhino and Atlantic Records for Cartoon Network and released on July 6, 1999. First unveiled in early 1999, it serves as a collection of songs from the channel's programs and anthological series, including those from Hanna-Barbera and others like Cow and Chicken and The Powerpuff Girls. In addition to the material, the album also includes six downloadable games and features for the listener. Critically, Cartoon Medley was awarded three out of five stars by AllMusic while "The Powerpuff Girls (End Theme)" was singled out by Billboard's Moira McCormick for being a "breakout" track.

== Background and release ==
Serving as a collection of television theme songs and music from Cartoon Network's programming, Cartoon Medley is presented as a fake TV dinner meal. The CD's cover advertises containing "Flaky fried Cow and Chicken, Space Ghost-Zorak-Brak veggies, and [a] Yogi gelatin treat". The project was first unveiled in the fourth volume of Film Score Monthly in 1999, before being released on July 6, 1999, by Kid Rhino, the children's label of Rhino Entertainment, along with Atlantic Records as both a CD and a cassette tape. Bonus features on the CD-ROM include six downloadable games and children's activities, such as liner notes including the lyrics to the corresponding tracks and samples of video games featured on Cartoon Network's official website.

While creating the compilation album, Cartoon Network's Vice President of Off-Channel Commerce, Jamie Porges, imagined having more material than just the title songs from television series. Long-time fan Craig McCracken, creator of The Powerpuff Girls and storyboard artist for Dexter's Laboratory, enlisted the help of Scottish band Bis in order to record material; together, they co-created the "End Theme" specifically for The Powerpuff Girls. As part of an advertisement campaign for Cartoon Medley, individuals were able to access Cartoon Network's official website and listed to snippets of album tracks "Boo Boo, Baba, Dee Dee", "The Powerpuff Girls", and "Josie & the Pussycats".

== Composition ==
The soundtrack album features a total of 38 songs and has a duration of 35 minutes and 47 seconds. Voice actor Phil Baron served as the executive producer of the project while Don Kitabayashi was the compilation producer. Mastering and supervision of the production were handled by Bob Fisher and Ben Trask, respectively. Beginning and ending the album are short and long versions of Cartoon Network's "Powerhouse" theme song. The themes from Hanna-Barbera's series on Cartoon Medley were selected from Josie & the Pussycats, The Flintstones, The Jetsons, Dastardly and Muttley in Their Flying Machines. The Real Adventures of Jonny Quest, The Yogi Bear Show, The Huckleberry Hound Show, and The Quick Draw McGraw Show. Music from Johnny Bravo, Scooby-Doo, Where Are You!, Ed, Edd n Eddy, 2 Stupid Dogs, Underdog, Speed Racer, SWAT Kats: The Radical Squadron, Space Ghost Coast to Coast, Cartoon Planet, Animaniacs, Pinky and the Brain, Freakazoid!, The Tex Avery Show, and I Am Weasel are also featured on the album.

== Reception ==
Professional ratings
Review scores
Source	Rating
AllMusic	3/5 stars

AllMusic rated the collection three out of five stars. Additionally, Moira McCormick from Billboard considered "The Powerpuff Girls (End Theme)" as the main "breakout track" among the album.

== Track listing ==
Cartoon Medley
No.	Title	Writer(s)	Length
1.	"Powerhouse (Short Version)"	Raymond Scott	0:30
2.	"Johnny Bravo"	Louis Fagenson	0:32
3.	"Boo Boo, Baba, Dee Dee"	Eddie Horst; Michael Kohler; S. Patrick	1:01
4.	"The Powerpuff Girls"	James L. Venable; Steve Rucker; Thomas Chase	1:05
5.	"The Powerpuff Girls (End Theme)"	Bis; Venable; Rucker; Chase	0:38
6.	"Dexter's Laboratory"	Pamela Phillips-Oland; Rucker; Chase	0:31
7.	"Dexter's Laboratory (Closing)"	Phillips-Oland; Rucker; Chase	0:31
8.	"Dexter's Poem"	Mary Rutt; Rucker; Chase	0:32
9.	"Josie & the Pussycats"	Denby Williams; Hoyt Curtin; Joseph Barbera	1:01
10.	"Scooby-Doo, Where Are You!"	Ben Raleigh; David Mook	1:02
11.	"(Meet) The Flintstones"	Barbera; Curtin; William Hanna	0:38
12.	"The Jetsons"	Barbera; Curtin; Hanna	0:59
13.	"Cartoon Cartoon"	Steve Mank	1:02
14.	"Cow and Chicken"	David Feiss; Guy Moon	0:32
15.	"Legend of Sailcat"	Bill Burnett	2:18
16.	"Cow and Chicken's Poem"	Moon; Rutt	0:31
17.	"Pork Butts"	Deane Taylor; Stuart Hill	0:32
18.	"Ed, Edd n Eddy"	Patric Caird	0:31
19.	"2 Stupid Dogs"	Chris Desmond; Tom Seufert	0:27
20.	"Underdog"	Chester Stover; Joseph Harris; Treadwell Covington; W. Watts Biggers	0:38
21.	"Speed Racer"	Nobuyoshi Koshibe; Peter Fernandez	1:07
22.	"Dastardly and Muttley in Their Flying Machines (Stop That Pigeon!)"	Barbera; Hanna	1:13
23.	"SWAT Kats"	John Zuker; Matt Muhoberac	1:02
24.	"The Real Adventures of Jonny Quest"	Gary Lionelli; Curtin; Barbera; Hanna	1:04
25.	"Space Ghost Coast to Coast"	Horst; Sonny Sharrock	1:22
26.	"Cartoon Planet"	Bill Bookheim	0:32
27.	"Smells Like Cartoon Planet"	Andy Merrill; Pete Smith	1:35
28.	"Tom and Jerry"	Scott Bradley	0:26
29.	"Animaniacs"	Tom Ruegger; Richard Stone	1:09
30.	"Pinky and the Brain"	Ruegger; Stone	1:30
31.	"Freakazoid"	Ruegger; Stone	1:02
32.	"Yogi Bear"	Charles Shows; Curtin; Barbera; Hanna	0:44
33.	"Huckleberry Hound"	Shows; Curtin; Barbera; Hanna	0:42
34.	"(That's) Quick Draw McGraw"	Curtin; Barbera; Hanna	0:46
35.	"The Tex Avery Show"	Ann McCarthy; Eddie Horst	0:31
36.	"I Am Weasel"	Bill Fulton; Richard Pursel	0:31
37.	"I.M. Weasel's Poem"	Fulton; Rutt	0:32
38.	"Powerhouse (Long Version)"	Scott	4:37
Total length:			35:47

== Release history ==
Region	Date	Format	Label
United States	July 6, 1999	CD	Kid Rhino
United States	July 6, 1999	Cassette	Kid Rhino
