= List of The Powerpuff Girls soundtracks =

The following is a list of soundtracks from the animated television series The Powerpuff Girls, created by Craig McCracken, which ran on Cartoon Network from November 18, 1998, to March 25, 2005. The releases include 2000's Heroes & Villains, 2001's The City of Soundsville, and 2003's Power Pop. All three albums were released by Rhino Entertainment

== Heroes & Villains ==
The Powerpuff Girls: Heroes & Villains: Music Inspired by The Powerpuff Girls

Soundtrack album by Various artists
- Released: July 18, 2000
- Genres: Indie pop, pop rock
- Length: 40:14
- Label: Rhino
- Producers: Mark Mothersbaugh; Bob Casale

Professional ratings
Review scores
| Source | Rating |
|---|---|
| AllMusic | 4/5 stars |
| Dayton Daily News | B |
| Entertainment Weekly | B− |
| Pitchfork | 6.3/10 |
| Rolling Stone | 3/5 stars |

Produced by Mark Mothersbaugh and Bob Casale of Devo, The Powerpuff Girls: Heroes & Villains: Music Inspired by The Powerpuff Girls was released on July 18, 2000, on CD and audio cassette. The songs are connected by spoken interludes (recorded by the show's voice cast) to form a loose storyline in which the girls mobilize to stop Mojo Jojo from destroying Townsville. Each band wrote a song about a character, each of them based on "an assignment regarding which part of the story their song would illustrate." Craig McCracken said: "I love these bands, and listening to their work inspires my work. Each song on the album focuses on a different aspect of The Powerpuff Girls, and together they tell a story. From Townsville in danger to the day finally being saved". Although David Byrne recorded a song titled "Buttercup, Blossom, and Bubbles Say" along with his daughter Malu, who wrote the lyrics, the track was left out of the album. "Pray for the Girls" by Frank Black, that was featured on the soundtrack, would later be used during the end credits of The Powerpuff Girls Movie (2002).

The New York Times journalist Ann Powers praised the pop album's original songs, saying, "The precocious sound these bands cultivate has never had a more appropriate niche." Heather Phares of the All Music Guide called the album "appropriately hip and funny" and stated that it is "much more than just a 'music inspired by' marketing piece." Meanwhile, David Wild of Rolling Stone gave it 3 out of 5 stars, saying that "it's the indie-ish mix of acts that makes Heroes and Villains such a tuneful, trippy blast," highlighting The Apples in Stereo's "Signal in the Sky (Let's Go)" as a "propulsive, bubblegum-delicious" song that "nearly steal[s] the show." Additionally, the album topped Billboard's children's music chart for six weeks upon its debut.

=== Track Listing ===
| No. | Title | Performer(s) | Length |
|---|---|---|---|
| 1. | "The Powerpuff Girls (Main Theme)" | Chase, Rucker, Venable (composers) | 1:16 |
| 2. | "Go Monkey Go" | Devo | 3:09 |
| 3. | "Pray for the Girls" | Frank Black | 3:53 |
| 4. | "Signal in the Sky (Let's Go)" | The Apples in Stereo | 3:26 |
| 5. | "Walk & Chew Gum" | Optiganally Yours | 3:23 |
| 6. | "Buttercup (I'm a Super Girl)" | Shonen Knife | 2:38 |
| 7. | "B.L.O.S.S.O.M." | Komeda | 3:32 |
| 8. | "Bubbles" | Dressy Bessy | 2:05 |
| 9. | "Fight the Power" | Bis | 3:38 |
| 10. | "Don't Look Down" | The Sugarplastic | 4:31 |
| 11. | "The Fight" | Cornelius | 1:53 |
| 12. | "Friends Win" | The Bill Doss | 2:39 |
| 13. | "The Powerpuff Girls (End Theme)" | Bis | 2:00 |
| 14. | "Love Makes The World Go 'Round" (hidden track attached to Track 13) | Marty & Elayne with John Andrews | 1:53 |

== The City of Soundsville ==
The City of Soundsville: Music from The Powerpuff Girls

Soundtrack album by Various artists
- Released: September 18, 2001
- Genre: Electronica
- Length: 40:36
- Label: Rhino
- Producer: James L. Venable

Professional ratings
Review scores
| Source | Rating |
|---|---|
| AllMusic | 4/5 stars |

The City of Soundsville: Music from The Powerpuff Girls was released on September 18, 2001, on CD, audio cassette, and vinyl record. Heather Phares of the All Music Guide was quite pleased with the soundtrack, calling it "a complete delight" and "without a doubt one of the coolest children's albums in recent memory."

The album consists of instrumental remixes that represent key elements of the series, including the girls, several villains and supporting characters, and the city of Townsville itself. Samples of lines spoken by the characters are interspersed throughout each track.

Track Listing

| No. | Title | Length |
|---|---|---|
| 1. | "Main Title" | 2:39 |
| 2. | "Townsville" | 2:38 |
| 3. | "Mojo Jojo" | 3:05 |
| 4. | "Blossom" | 2:38 |
| 5. | "Gangreen Gang" | 2:10 |
| 6. | "Boogie Man" | 2:07 |
| 7. | "Pokey Oaks" | 1:58 |
| 8. | "Mayor" | 1:31 |
| 9. | "Fuzzy Lumpkins" | 3:00 |
| 10. | "Buttercup" | 3:01 |
| 11. | "Amoeba Boys" | 1:58 |
| 12. | "Professor" | 1:53 |
| 13. | "Princess" | 1:30 |
| 14. | "Him" | 1:43 |
| 15. | "Bubbles" | 2:35 |
| 16. | "Hearts and Stars" | 2:00 |
| 17. | "Super Secret City of Soundsville Song" | 4:10 |

== Power Pop ==
The Powerpuff Girls: Power Pop

Soundtrack album by Various artists
- Released: August 12, 2003
- Genres: Pop; power pop; UK garage; R&B
- Length: 43:21
- Label: Rhino
- Producers: Chris Pelcer; Lara Kiang; Craig King; Greg Charley; Leslie Mills

Professional ratings
Review scores
| Source | Rating |
|---|---|
| AllMusic | 2.5/5 stars |

The Powerpuff Girls: Power Pop was released on August 12, 2003, on CD and audio cassette. Despite positive reviews of the formerly released albums, the album earned a negative review from AllMusic's Heather Phares, who regarded Power Pop as a "big disappointment", saying "it's especially frustrating that they picked cookie-cutter teen pop for this album when Dexter's Laboratory: The Hip-Hop Experiment turned out so brilliantly (and featured hip-hop stars to boot)." Jon Caramanica wrote for Rolling Stone that "this series of femme-fronted acts articulate girl-power ideas so shallow they make the Spice Girls sound like feminist ideologues." Two songs on the soundtrack, "That's What Girls Do" by No Secrets and "Powerpunk End Theme" (originally titled "The Powerpuffs Girls (End Theme)") by Bis, were both featured during the end credits of The Powerpuff Girls Movie (2002). The album reached the 15th spot on Billboard's Top Kid Audio chart.

Track Listing

| No. | Title | Performer(s) | Length |
|---|---|---|---|
| 1. | "That's What Girls Do" (From The Powerpuff Girls Movie) | No Secrets | 3:10 |
| 2. | "Power of the Female" | Cherish | 3:29 |
| 3. | "Rocket Candy" | Leslie Mills | 2:46 |
| 4. | "What Do You Do" | Troys | 3:11 |
| 5. | "Me and My Girls" | Cherish | 4:07 |
| 6. | "All I Want" (Sunship Radio Edit) | Mis-Teeq | 3:29 |
| 7. | "Chemical X" | Cherish | 3:01 |
| 8. | "Special" | Vitamin C | 4:44 |
| 9. | "Baby I Don't Care" | Jennifer Ellison | 3:36 |
| 10. | "Buttercup (I'm a Super Girl)" | Shonen Knife | 2:32 |
| 11. | "On Top of Your World" | Sahara Hotnights | 3:18 |
| 12. | "Super Secret City of Soundsville Song" | Ursula 1000 | 4:12 |
| 13. | "Powerpunk End Theme" (From The Powerpuff Girls Movie) | Bis | 1:46 |

== See also ==
- Let's Go!
- Angels with Dirty Faces (Sugababes song)
- Cartoon Medley
