= Sci-Fi Steven =

Scottish singer, songwriter and producer

Steven Clark
- Also known as: Sci-Fi Steven
- Occupations: Singer, songwriter, producer
- Instruments: Vocals, guitar
- Years active: 1994–present
- Member of: bis

Steven Clark (known professionally as Sci-Fi Steven) is a Scottish singer, songwriter and producer. He is best known as a vocalist and guitarist of the Scottish band bis.

== Career ==
In 1994, Clark formed the Scottish indie pop band bis alongside his younger brother John Clark (John Disco) and Amanda MacKinnon (Manda Rin). Performing vocals and guitar, Clark helped shape the band's combination of punk rock, new wave and electronic pop.

The group attracted national attention in 1996 when they became the first unsigned band to perform on BBC's Top of the Pops.

Following bis's initial split in 2003, Clark reunited with his bandmates in the group data Panik in 2005. He also released two solo albums under the name Batteries: Batteries (2015) and The Finishing Line (2016).

Clark co-wrote and performed the closing theme song to the American animated series The Powerpuff Girls.

== Personal life ==
Clark is a lifelong supporter of Ayr United.
