= Woodfarm High School =

Coordinates: 55°48′12″N 4°18′38″W

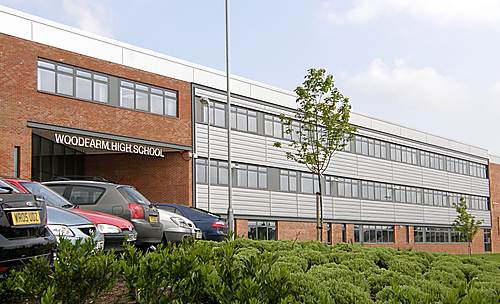
- Robslee Road G46 7AR, East Renfrewshire, Scotland

Information
- Type: Public School
- Established: 1962
- Head Teacher: Gillian Boyle (acting)
- Teaching staff: 70.45
- Grades: Scottish Qualifications Certificate
- Gender: Coeducational
- Enrolment: c. 700
Colour
Junior Tie
Senior Tie
- Website: http://www.ea.e-renfrew.sch.uk/woodfarm

Woodfarm High School is a Scottish comprehensive secondary school in Woodfarm, East Renfrewshire. It has a roll of approximately 700 pupils. Gillian Boyle is the acting Headmistress, taking over from Nicola MacGlashan who left to join nearby Williamwood High School in August 2021.

In 2012, it was ranked the 7th best state school in Scotland by the percentage of fifth years attaining at least five Higher passes.

== Previous building and fire ==
The original building, completed in 1963 ish, was partially destroyed in a large fire in 1975. It caused many pupils to be transferred to other schools while the building was demolished and replaced with a newer building. Some pupils were housed in a temporary structure made out of portable units that was reinforced by a brick built super structure at the back of the school grounds - this was built to be a temporary home for the upper school while the new main building was built and was intended to be pulled down once the new part of the school opened, with a maximum life of around 3 years. It was finally demolished in 2005 as part of the extension work, 30 years after it was first built. On the site of this building, called the Westfield Building, is a new large car park.

The original Woodfarm consisted of four separate buildings, one with all general departments including gym, office and management facilities, another with Art and Information Technology departments and the final with English, Maths, Science and Home Economics. The fire destroyed the English and Science departments. The English and Maths building was also named the "Westfield Building".

However, a new wing to the school was opened in 2006, housing the Science, Maths, and English departments, as well as the office and cafeteria. The new 'Street' area is used for in school events such as the school ceilidhs that are held every year in December.

Another fire occurred at the new school in 2017, causing damage to the roof.

== Cluster primary schools ==
The pupils of Woodfarm High School are mainly made up of students transferring from the three feeder primary schools: Thornliebank Primary School, Braidbar Primary School and Giffnock Primary School. A small percentage of pupils from primary schools in the Glasgow City Council area are also admitted to the school by placement request. In 2011, Robslee and Giffnock Primary Schools were merged to allow Our Lady of The Missions Roman Catholic Primary the use of the Robslee building. As of August 2014, Woodfarm High School has only 3 associated primaries: Braidbar Primary, Thornliebank Junior School and Giffnock Primary School.

== Notable alumni ==
- Graham Girvan (Former Scottish League Two footballer)
- Bradley Halsman (Scottish Highland Football League footballer currently playing for Nairn County F.C.)
- Jordan Halsman (Scottish League Two footballer currently playing for Elgin City)
- Chris Iwelumo (Former Scottish international footballer)
- Emily Middlemas (singer-songwriter, appeared on The X Factor)
- Dougie Payne (bassist for indie rock band Travis)
- Manda Rin (Scottish musician and designer, best known as a member of the indie pop band Bis)
- John "John Disco" Clark and brother Steven "Sci-Fi Steven" Clark, also of the pop group Bis.
- Craig Watson (1997 British Amateur Champion Scotland International Golfer, Walker Cup Player & Walker Cup Captain 2017)
- The Very Rev. Dr Martin Fair (Moderator of the General Assembly of Church of Scotland 2020-2021. Parish Minister Arbroath)
- Jennifer Reoch (Radio and TV presenter, and former Miss Scotland 2011)
- Sergio Casci (Screenwriter famous for American Cousins and Man Dancin')
