= Atom-Powered Action! =

EP by Bis
- Released: November 1996
- Recorded: Apollo Studios, Glasgow, Scotland, August 1996
- Genres: Indie pop, pop punk, electropop
- Length: 10:35
- Label: Wiiija

Bis chronology
Bis vs. the D.I.Y. Corps (1996)	Atom-Powered Action! (1996)	This Is Teen-C Power! (1996)

Atom-Powered Action! is an EP by the Scottish indie pop band Bis, release in 1996 by Wiiija Records. It was released on 7 inch vinyl, cassette tape and compact disc. One song on the EP, "Starbright Boy" would show up on their debut album The New Transistor Heroes in 1997.

== Track listing ==
All tracks written by Bis.

1. "Starbright Boy" (3:39)
2. "Wee Love" (1:24)
3. "Team Theme" (2:42)
4. "Cliquesuck" (2:50)

== Production ==
- Recorded by - Jim Brady
- Artwork - Ms.Rin

== Charts ==
Chart (1996)	Peak position
UK Singles Chart	54
Scottish Singles Chart	29
