= Intendo =

Compilation album by Bis
- Released: 11 August 1998
- Recorded: February 1996 (Practice Pad), January 1997–March 1998 (Apollo)
- Studios: The Practice Pad (Glasgow), Apollo (Glasgow)
- Genres: Pop punk, indie pop
- Length: 24:09
- Label: Grand Royal
- Producers: Rik Flick, Richie Demsey

Bis chronology
The New Transistor Heroes (1997)	Intendo (1998)	Social Dancing (1999)

Intendo is a compilation album by Scottish rock band Bis. It is a collection of non-album tracks plus one new song as a gift to the American market. It was released on both CD and 12-inch vinyl.

The compilation collects material from the "Everybody Thinks That They're Going to Get Theirs", "Sweet Shop Avengerz" and "Kandy Pop"/"Sweet Shop Avengerz" singles, as well as "Kid Cut", a one-sided 7-inch single given out at gigs in Glasgow and London, and tracks from the band's split singles with Heavenly and Lugworm.

== Track listing ==
Side A
No.	Title	Length
1.	"Grand Royal with Cheese (Intro)"	0:29
2.	"Statement of Intent (Remix)"	2:15
3.	"Girl Star (Remix)"	3:26
4.	"Clockwork Punk"	2:44
5.	"Famous (Demo)"	2:47
6.	"Ninja Hi-Skool"	1:48

Side B
No.	Title	Length
7.	"Kid Cut (Demo)"	2:08
8.	"Automatic Freestyle"	2:24
9.	"I'll Get You Back"	1:07
10.	"Cookie Cutter Kid"	4:00
11.	"Grand Royal with Cheese (Outro)"

- Packaging lists "Cookie Cutter Kid" and "Grand Royal with Cheese (Outro)" as separate tracks, but they are both on track 10.

== Critical response ==
Professional ratings
Review scores
Source	Rating
Allmusic	3/5 stars
Pitchfork	7.5/10
Robert Christgau	(**)

Jason Kaufman writing for Allmusic gave the compilation a positive review, remarking that while the material doesn't break new ground for the band, "if anything, the abbreviated length of this collection hits harder at times than the whole of the slightly long-winded Heroes [The New Transistor Heroes], making their nostalgic dance formula easier to swallow". Robert Christgau was equally positive, commenting that Intendo was "Cute, and not just the way demos are cute".

== Personnel ==
Bis

- Disco – guitar, vocals, programming
- Manda – vocals, keyboards, programming
- Sci-Fi – vocals, guitar, programming; drums (on "Grand Royal with Cheese" (Intro) and (Outro))

Additional musicians

- Ian Copeland – drums on "Statement of Intent (Remix)"
- Rik Flick – blues harp on "Statement of Intent (Remix)"

== Production ==
"Grand Royal with Cheese" (Intro) and (Outro)

- Recorded by: Richie Demsey
- Recorded at: The Practice Pad, Glasgow, Scotland, February 1996

"Statement of Intent (Remix)"

- Remixed by: Jason Famous
- Remixed at: Apollo Recordings, Glasgow, Scotland, March 1998

"Girl Star (Remix)"

- Remixed by: Andy Haldane
- Remixed at: Apollo Recordings, Glasgow, Scotland, March 1998

Tracks 4 to 10

- Recorded by: Rik Flick
- Recorded at: Apollo Recordings, Glasgow, Scotland, January 1997 to January 1998
