= This Is Teen-C Power! =

EP by Bis
- Released: 10 December 1996
- Recorded: April 1995 and March 1996 at the Practice Pad, Glasgow, Scotland; December 1995 at MCM Studios, Hamilton Scotland
- Genres: Pop punk, indie pop
- Length: 15:13
- Label: Grand Royal

Bis chronology
Atom-Powered Action! (1996)	This Is Teen-C Power! (1996)	The New Transistor Heroes (1997)

Professional ratings
Review scores
Source	Rating
AllMusic	4/5 stars
The Village Voice	B+

This is Teen-C Power! is an EP by the Scottish indie pop band Bis, released in 1996 through Beastie Boys' Grand Royal label. It was a preview for American audiences, collecting material from the previous EPs: Disco Nation 45 (1995), The Secret Vampire Soundtrack (1996) and Bis vs. the D.I.Y. Corps (1996).

The EP also includes a newly recorded version of the song "Kill Yr Boyfriend"; the original version appeared on Bis' first release Transmissions on the Teen-C Tip!.

== Critical reception ==
AllMusic called the EP "the best distillation of their anarchic early style". Spin noted "This is Fake D.I.Y." as the best song on the EP. Roctober wrote: "I guess I'm a sucker but this is Adorable-Core, and the songs are actually really nice and good."

== Track listing ==
All tracks written by Bis.

1. "Kill Yr Boyfriend" (2:07) (New Version)
2. "School Disco" (2:38)
3. "Kandy Pop" (2:47)
4. "This is Fake D.I.Y." (2:14)
5. "Burn the Suit" (2:46)
6. "Teen-C Power!" (3:11)

== Credits ==
"School Disco", "This is Fake D.I.Y." and "Burn the Suit"

- Recorded at: the Practice Pad, Glasgow, Scotland in April 1995.
- Recorded by: Simon Strange

"Kandy Pop" and "Teen-C Power!"

- Recorded by: Richie Dempsty and Paul Savage
- Recorded at: MCM Studios, Hamilton Scotland in December 1995.

"Kill Yr Boyfriend" (New Version)

- Re-Recorded at the Practice Pad, Glasgow, Scotland in March 1996.
