= Music for a Stranger World =

EP by Bis
- Released: 2000; 2001 (US)
- Recorded: Apollo Recording, Glasgow
- Genres: Electropop, indie pop
- Length: 22:59
- Labels: Wiiija Records, Lookout! Records
- Producers: Jason Famous, Bis

Bis chronology
Social Dancing (1999)	Music for a Stranger World (2000)	I Love Bis (2001)

Professional ratings
Review scores
Source	Rating
AllMusic	4/5 stars
Pitchfork	2.2/10

Music for a Stranger World is the Bis EP that bridges the musical gap between the Social Dancing and Return To Central albums. It was released in 2000 though the American version didn't come out until 2001, a year after its initial release.

== Track listing ==
All tracks written by Bis.

1. "Dead Wrestlers" (3:46)
2. "Are You Ready?" (3:28)
3. "How Can We Be Strange" (3:30)
4. "I Want it All" (5:06)
5. "Beats at the Office" (4:17)
6. "Punk Rock Points" (2:52)
- This matches the UK and USA CD.
- The Japanese version adds the song "Why are We Waiting?" at the start of the EP and "DJ" at the end.

== Personnel ==
- Producer - Jason Famous, Bis
- Design – Manda, Phil Lee
- Illustration – Shed
- Photography – Michael Spencer Jones
