= Bis vs. the D.I.Y. Corps =

EP by Bis
- Released: June 1996
- Recorded: March 1996 at the Practice Pad, Glasgow, Scotland
- Genre: Pop punk, indie pop
- Length: 7:13
- Label: Teen-C Recordings sketch 001

Bis chronology
| The Secret Vampire Soundtrack (1996) | Bis vs. the D.I.Y. Corps (1996) | Atom-Powered Action! (1996) |

Professional ratings
Review scores
| Source | Rating |
|---|---|
| AllMusic | 3/5 stars |

Bis vs. the D.I.Y. Corps is the fourth extended play musical recording by the Scottish indie pop band Bis. It was the first release on Bis's very own Teen-C Recordings label. Soon after the group signed to Wiiija in the UK and Grand Royal in the US. It reached number forty-five on the UK Singles Chart in June 1996.

It was released on 7 inch vinyl, cassette tape and compact disc. When listing this release or the song "This is Fake D.I.Y." Bis just as often use the last period in the acronym D.I.Y. as they don't.

"This is Fake D.I.Y." is an attack on the commercialization of independent music such as the popular practice of major labels using subsidiaries such as Indolent and Food to promote artists as independent or alternative. The song also takes aim at wider marketing practices such as coloured vinyl, 'free' posters and multi-part CD sets. However, the group took on some of the marketing practices they criticised for their 1999 singles "Action and Drama" and "Detour".

“This Is Fake D.I.Y.” inspired the naming of the UK publication DIY.

== Track listing ==
All tracks are written by Bis.

| No. | Title | Length |
|---|---|---|
| 1. | "This is Fake D.I.Y" | 2:14 |
| 2. | "Burn the Suit" | 2:46 |
| 3. | "Dance to the Disco Beat" | 2:13 |

== Personnel ==
- Miss A.
- J. Disco
- Peach Belly Boy
- Richie - Recording

== Charts ==
| Chart (1996) | Peak position |
|---|---|
| UK Singles Chart | 45 |
| Scottish Singles Chart | 47 |
| UK Rock & Metal (OCC) | 1 |
