= Photoshop (disambiguation) =

Adobe Photoshop is a graphics editor developed and published by Adobe.

Photoshop may also refer to:

- Adobe Photoshop Elements software, a consumer level edition of the Adobe Photoshop software
- Photoshop contest, a competition to produce digitally modified images
- Photoshopping, a slang term originally taken from Adobe Photoshop and now used generically for digitally altering photographs
- "Photoshop", a song by Bis from their 1997 album The New Transistor Heroes
- "Photoshop Flowey", a boss in the 2015 RPG video game Undertale
- Raster graphics editor, a type of graphics editor used to create and edit raster images.
