= The Powerpuff Girls Movie =

2002 American animated superhero film by Craig McCracken

- Theatrical release poster
- Directed by: Craig McCracken
- Written by: Charlie Bean; Lauren Faust; Craig McCracken; Paul Rudish; Don Shank
- Story by: Charlie Bean; Lauren Faust; Craig McCracken; Amy Keating Rogers; Paul Rudish; Don Shank
- Based on: The Powerpuff Girls by Craig McCracken
- Produced by: Donna Castricone
- Starring: Cathy Cavadini; Tara Strong; E. G. Daily; Roger L. Jackson; Tom Kane; Tom Kenny; Jennifer Hale; Jennifer Martin
- Edited by: Rob DeSales
- Music by: James L. Venable
- Production company: Cartoon Network Studios
- Distributed by: Warner Bros. Pictures
- Release date: July 3, 2002
- Running time: 74 minutes
- Country: United States
- Language: English
- Budget: $11 million
- Box office: $16.4 million

The Powerpuff Girls Movie is a 2002 American animated superhero comedy film co-written and directed by Craig McCracken. It serves as a prequel to McCracken's television series The Powerpuff Girls and stars the regular television cast of Cathy Cavadini, Tara Strong, E. G. Daily, Roger L. Jackson, Tom Kane, Tom Kenny, Jennifer Hale, and Jennifer Martin. The film depicts the origins of the Powerpuff Girls (Blossom, Bubbles, and Buttercup) and how they became Townsville's defenders. Series composer, James L. Venable wrote the film's music score.

Produced by Cartoon Network Studios as its first theatrical film, The Powerpuff Girls Movie was released in theaters on July 3, 2002, by Warner Bros. Pictures. The film received generally positive reviews from critics, but was a box-office failure, earning $16 million on a budget of $11 million, which was partly blamed on a crowded marketplace.

In June 2026, a new Powerpuff Girls film was announced to be in development at Warner Bros. Pictures Animation.

== Plot ==
In the crime- and injustice-riddled city of Townsville, (Note: The city of Townsville in the show is a fictional American city. It is not to be confused with the real-life city of Townsville in Queensland, Australia.) Professor Utonium mixes sugar, spice and everything nice, hoping to produce the "perfect little girls" to improve Townsville. However, Jojo, the professor's pet chimpanzee and destructive laboratory assistant, breaks a flask of Chemical X, which spills onto the concoction. The experiment succeeds, producing three little girls whom the Professor names Blossom, Bubbles, and Buttercup. He also discovers that the girls have gained superpowers from the added Chemical X. Despite the girls' recklessness with their powers, they all immediately grow to love each other as a family.

On their first day of school, the girls learn about the game of tag and begin to play it among themselves, which quickly grows destructive once they use their powers. The girls take their game downtown, where they cause extensive damage to the city until the Professor calms them down. That night, the Professor tells the girls to not use their powers in public anymore. The next day, the citizens of Townsville treat the girls as outcasts due to their destructive behavior. The Professor is arrested and jailed as responsible for the incident, which forces the girls to try to make their way home from school on foot. After a while, they become lost in an alleyway, where the Gangreen Gang corners them. Suddenly, Jojo – now superintelligent after the Chemical X explosion mutated his brain – rescues the trio.

Seeking revenge at the Professor for favoring the girls instead of him, Jojo gains their sympathy by convincing them that he is also hated for his powers and tricks them into helping him build a laboratory and a machine powered by Chemical X, which he claims will "improve the city". Afterward, Jojo rewards them with a trip to the local zoo, where he secretly implants small transportation devices on all the primates there. That night, Jojo teleports the primates to his lab and uses his new machine to inject them with Chemical X, which turns them into evil mutants like himself. The next morning, after the Professor is released from prison, the girls show him all the "good" they have done, only to discover that the primates are attacking the city. Jojo, renaming himself as Mojo Jojo, publicly announces the girls assisted him, which damages their reputation further and makes the Professor completely heartbroken beyond his criminal conviction. Dejected, the girls exile themselves on an asteroid in outer space.

Mojo announces his intention to rule the planet but becomes angry when his minions disobey him and concoct their own plans to terrorize Townsville. Meanwhile, on the asteroid, the banished girls hear Mojo trying to strangle the Professor and return to Earth, where they start rescuing the citizens. After Buttercup uses her powers to defeat a giant ape, Blossom convinces the former and Bubbles that they can use their powers to fight back. After his army is defeated, Mojo gives himself an overdose of Chemical X and grows into a giant monster, easily subduing the girls. Rejecting Mojo's offer of an alliance to take over the world, the girls push him off a decrepit skyscraper just as the Professor arrives with an antidote for Chemical X. Mojo lands on the Antidote X, which shrinks him down to his original size and allows the police to arrest him.

The girls consider using the Antidote X to remove their powers, thinking they would be accepted as normal girls, but the people of Townsville protest against this, apologize for misjudging them, and praise them instead for their heroism. The Mayor of Townsville requests that the girls use their powers to fight crime in the city and, with permission from the Professor, they become the city's most beloved crime-fighting superhero team, "The Powerpuff Girls".

== Voice cast ==
- Cathy Cavadini as Blossom
- Tara Strong as Bubbles
- E. G. Daily as Buttercup
- Roger L. Jackson as Mojo Jojo
- Tom Kane as Professor Utonium and Talking Dog
- Tom Kenny as the Mayor of Townsville, Narrator, Mitch Mitchelson, Snake, and Lil' Arturo
- Jennifer Hale as Ms. Keane
- Jennifer Martin as Ms. Sarah Bellum
- Jeff Bennett as Ace, Big Billy, Grubber, Baboon Kaboom, The Go-Go Patrol, Hacha Chacha, and the Anchorman
- Grey DeLisle and Phil LaMarr as additional character voices
- Frank Welker as various evil primates
- Kevin Michael Richardson as Rocko Socko and Ojo Tango
- Rob Paulsen as Hotta Watta, Killa Drilla, Blah-Blah Blah-Blah, and The Doot Da Doot Da Doo Doos

== Production ==
During the film's production, series creator and director Craig McCracken did not want it to appeal exclusively to girls, as the series' merchandise made it out to be, choosing to make an action-adventure film that felt closer to his conception of the Powerpuff Girls. When deciding what the final plot would be, the crew had "one that was purely an action show, and then one that was more of a subtle character piece". Cartoon Network liked both of them, so the result is a hybrid. McCracken said that there was no real difference when directing the film in comparison to a standard TV episode:

When we make the TV show, we look at them as mini films. The show is really condensed, it always keeps moving and it's got an energy level to it because of the time limitation, so my first concern was, are we going to lose that pacing going into a long form? But as it turned out, the movie still moves at the same pace that the show does. It still has that distinctive feeling to it.

The Powerpuff Girls was known for its audience being highly composed by "underground" adults, and the film was intended in part to appeal to that demographic. According to Cartoon Network executives, it was also meant to "spark sales of DVDs and home videos, pack in crowds overseas and set kids scrambling to buy cartoon-themed merchandise". Jim Samples, executive vice president and general manager of the network, saw the year 2002 as a good opportunity to bring the show to the big screen, given the success of family features such as Disney's Lilo & Stitch and the live-action adaptation of Scooby-Doo. During production, McCracken was encouraged by Cartoon Network to make an edgier film; he recalled via Tumblr:

When we started the film, I was encouraged by [Cartoon Network] to make the movie for "25-year-old guys". So we upped the seriousness and action and downplayed the funny. By the time we finished, there was a regime change at CN and the new heads of the network were upset we didn't make a poppy, colorful kids movie [...] This was when they first had the idea that they wanted to try producing animation for older audiences, Samurai Jack was a part of this thinking as well. We were sort of the guinea pigs for what would later evolve into Adult Swim.

Like the series, the film's animation was provided by Rough Draft Korea, with additional digital compositing and effects by Mercury Filmworks and additional animation by Savage Frog! and Virtual Magic Animation. All work done overseas was then shipped to Los Angeles, where the main crew put every single shot together digitally at the recently opened Cartoon Network Studios. The film keeps the staple look of the television series with minimal changes, with characters such as the Girls and the Professor having a mostly geometric look. The backgrounds are hand-drawn with some computer-generated enhancements. The movie also went on to have some minor edits in pacing for the final cut, but "nothing so disastrous that it affected the final film", according to McCracken. Critics observed that the film's promotional campaign was notably muted, receiving significantly less marketing support than other animated features from the same year, such as Hey Arnold!: The Movie. However, McCracken said that Warner Bros. was putting $20 million into promoting the film. Some of the production process was also documented for the film's subsequent home video releases. According to McCracken, 49 half-hour episodes of the TV series had been made up to that point, but production on the show went on hiatus to focus on the making of the movie.

== Music ==
The crew was against including pop songs or any musical numbers that would interfere "in the body of the story", in order to respect audience expectations. However, the end credits are accompanied by a punk rock version of the series' ending theme written and performed by Bis, as well as "Pray for the Girls" by Frank Black and "That's What Girls Do" by No Secrets. James L. Venable, who composed the music for the television series, also composed the film's score, blending traditional orchestration with electronica. He had listened to "old monster movie scores" and acts such as The Chemical Brothers and Propellerheads for inspiration in developing the series' musical style, which was then poured into the movie. McCracken thought the band Gorillaz would be fitting to perform the film's ending credits song, considering that the plot is about "evil monkeys attacking Townsville" and that the band members are animated. Gorillaz creators Jamie Hewlett and Damon Albarn showed interest in composing the song, but their schedule made it impossible to accomplish. (Later on, Ace, one of the members of the Gangreen Gang, common adversaries of the Powerpuff Girls, briefly joined Gorillaz to replace member Murdoc Niccals while he was in jail on their 2018 album The Now Now.)

== Promotion ==
By February 2002, the film was already being promoted on Cartoon Network's official website, where details about the "Be an Artist" contest were available, prompting fans in the United States under the age of 18 to send their drawings in the hopes of having it appear in a scene from the movie. The main winner was Laura Kramer, a 13-year-old girl from Ligonier, Indiana, who was chosen by director Craig McCracken. In Latin America, kids could enter a contest in which the first-place winner earned three tickets for the movie and a video camera. One of Delta Express' Boeing 737-200 jet aircraft (registered N310DA) featured a special aircraft with Powerpuff Girls-themed livery, and customers were given promotional items regarding the movie, including activity sheets, temporary tattoos and buttons.

Kids' WB aired four episodes of the television show in a marathon to help promote the movie. Prior to the release of the film, Daisy Rock produced a heart-shaped, 3/4 scale, pink guitar featuring all three Powerpuff Girls, and another featuring Mojo Jojo in a "premium alder body" with a 24-3/4" scale. Both instruments had a limited release. Out of the one hundred, some were given to cable viewers during the Cartoon Cartoon Fridays primetime block on May 31, 2002. A few others were available on Cartoon Network's online store for a short period. Artists who participated in the first two Powerpuff Girls soundtracks also got their own copy. From July of that year, Jack in the Box restaurants offered six toys based on the movie as part of their kid's meal menu: Punching Buttercup, Kung-Fu Bubbles, Karate Kick Blossom, Mojo Jojo's Volcano Viewer, Bulging Brains Mojo Jojo, and Skyscraper Mo Mojo Jojo. In July 17, DC published the film's official comic adaptation, written by Amy Rogers and illustrated by Phil Moy, Christopher Cook and Mike DeCarlo. Keebler, Dreyer's, Mervyn's, Toys "R" Us, Walmart, and the Got Milk? campaign were also commercial allies of the movie.

In August 2002, the MTR Corporation, which had previously used Blossom, Bubbles and Buttercup as ambassadors in a campaign for subway safety in Hong Kong, promoted the film's debut in the Chinese market by selling a set of commemorative Powerpuff Girls-themed tickets at their stations, which also came with a sticker, a movie ticket coupon and a rag doll keychain of one of the three girls.

== Release ==
A premiere screening was held by Warner Bros. Pictures in Century City, California on June 22, 2002, which a part of the film's cast and crew attended, as well as celebrities such as Melissa Gilbert, Danny Bonaduce, Christine Lahti, Harry Hamlin, and Lisa Renee Foiles. In the United States, the film was rated PG by the Motion Picture Association of America (MPAA) for "non-stop frenetic animated action". The film was released in theaters on July 3, 2002, accompanied by a G-rated Dexter's Laboratory short titled "Chicken Scratch", in which boy genius Dexter gets chickenpox and tries not to scratch to avoid turning into an actual chicken. The Powerpuff Girls Movie later made its television debut on Cartoon Network on May 23, 2003.

=== Home media ===
Warner Home Video released the film on Region 1 VHS and DVD on November 5, 2002, in a move to recover from the film's lackluster theatrical performance. The DVD included extras such as deleted scenes, behind-the-scenes footage and audio commentaries. Despite being filmed in 1.85:1 aspect ratio, the DVD and VHS are both in a 4:3 pan and scan ratio only, much akin to that of the original series. The Region 2 DVD release presents the film in its original 16:9 widescreen aspect ratio, but it removes some bonus features. As of 2025, the film has not been released on Blu-ray and digital, but the widescreen release of the film was shown on the HBO Max streaming service upon launch on May 27, 2020, until it was removed from the service later that year.

== Reception ==
=== Box office ===
The Powerpuff Girls Movie was released on July 3, 2002. Some analysts expected it to gross around $15 million over its five-day Fourth-of-July holiday weekend. However, Mekeisha Madden from The News Tribune noted that the film was facing a strong competition against films like Lilo & Stitch, Hey Arnold!: The Movie, and Warner's own Scooby-Doo, as well as opening day competition with Men in Black II and Like Mike. Madden stated that: "The real question, according to some fans and industry experts, is if the movie is still timely. While the show is still hot with younger kids, The Powerpuff Girls reached its height in popularity with people over 14 in the summer of 2000".

The film opened to $6.1 million and placed ninth at the box office across the Fourth-of-July weekend. By July 26, it had dropped to No. 34 on the U.S. box office ranking. It eventually grossed $11.4 million domestically and around $5 million internationally for a lifetime gross of $16.4 million. The film's underwhelming financial performance was blamed on its release-timing, a lack of late-night showings, an overcrowded marketplace, opening day competition from Men in Black II, and a decline in the show's popularity. Dan Fellman, president of domestic theatrical distribution at Warner Bros., told The Wall Street Journal that "parents just didn't feel so guilty about missing The Powerpuff Girls or The Country Bears," as there was an excess of family-oriented films to choose from during that season.

Jim Samples, Cartoon Network's general manager at the time, assessed that the film's performance was a "big disappointment", but still held out hope that it would achieve greater success overseas and via DVD sales. He additionally asserted carefulness in choosing release dates for its future releases. Brandon Gray, a Box Office Mojo contributor, noted that the film's lack of evening showings "alienated" many of the series' older fans. Mike Lazzo, former senior vice president of Cartoon Network's Adult Swim, attributed the film's financial failure to a bad combination of "business" (as for when and how it was released) and "creative" (with it being "just good" instead of "genius").

In 2013, series creator Craig McCracken, in an interview with The Grid, owed the film's performance at the time to its preconceived notions as a female-oriented product, saying:

"The kids didn't come—a lot of boys [...] didn't want to tell people they were fans of it and didn't buy tickets. There's a safety of watching Powerpuff at home if you're a guy."

Screen Rant listed the movie as one of the 25 lowest-grossing superhero films at the global box office in 2018.

=== Critical response ===
On Rotten Tomatoes, the film holds an approval rating of 64% based on 99 reviews, with an average rating of 6.1/10. The site's critical consensus reads, "It plays like an extended episode, but The Powerpuff Girls Movie is still lots of fun." On Metacritic, the film has a weighted average score of 65 out of 100 based on 25 critics, indicating "generally favorable reviews". Audiences polled by CinemaScore gave the film an average grade of "B" on an A+ to F scale.

Bob Longino of the Atlanta Journal-Constitution praised the film, saying that "the intricate drawings emanate 1950s futuristic pizazz like a David Hockney scenescape", and that the script is both "sinfully cynical and aw-shucks sweet". He also called it "one of the few American creations that is both gleeful pop culture and exquisite high art." Nell Minow of Common Sense Media gave the film four stars out of five, saying that it "may be a treat for the fans of the show, but its non-stop excitement and sense of humor is going to win over just about anyone". Virginia Heffernan of The New York Times said that "the movie is cute [...] but its violent, snickering style is pure Americana", and that it evokes the "outlandish classic" look of McCracken's inspirations. Ben Nuckols wrote for Associated Press that the protagonists' big eyes were the "only remarkable thing", which he considered "a shame, because the girls are delightful and the movie is skillfully made". New Sunday Times praised the animation, particularly the sequence where the Powerpuff Girls play tag, and said that "there's a lot to like about this movie", calling it "a good first movie".

Jerry Beck wrote for Animation World Network that the film was "good-looking [...] but suffered from story problems", whereas Christene Meyers from Billings Gazette thought that the story could have been told in a few minutes. Contrarily, IGN's KJB said that the movie did not "overstay its welcome" with its 70-minute running time and gave it 4 out of 5 stars. Dan Via, writing for The Washington Post, said that "even with its flaws, The Powerpuff Girls Movie offers dramatic pacing, cleverness and charm that are hard to come by in the summertime multiplex", ranging from moments of "epic stillness to the crash-bang-kapow flash of the action sequences". Mariano Kairuz, from the Argentine newspaper Página/12, wrote: "It's one of the happily bizarre cartoon movies to hit theaters in quite some time. One might even wonder how Cartoon Network and Warner authorized the multi-million dollar budget for something that looks and feels somewhat uncommercial".

Marc Savlov of The Austin Chronicle gave the film 3 1/2 stars out of 5, describing it as "retro fun that contains a serious self-empowerment message for little girls and little boys alike", as well as "brilliant, wacky, and utterly charming fluff". In a review for the newspaper Riverfront Times, Gregory Weinkauf said that the film's exploration of the girls' emotions during the asteroid scene was "a brilliant sequence" before the "blaze of chaotic action" in the third act. However, he was critical about the film's "bizarre anal sensibilities" (e.g. "cheeky shots of monkey butts — electroshocks slithering up into them, turd-bombs plopping out of them") and what he deemed as a "psychosexual fodder", with the Mayor having a "pickle fetish" and Sara Bellum's "voluptuous curves [that] fill the frame but whose actual head and identity as a mature woman are curiously omitted."

The film also received some mild criticism for its violence, which some felt was too extreme for a family-oriented film, especially in the wake of the 9/11 attacks the previous year. The Catholic Bishops Conference of the Philippines (CBCP) gave the film a similarly negative review, labelling it as "disturbing", further opining that the movie was nothing but a "saturation of violent acts carried out with a fierce vengeance."

=== Accolades ===
In early 2003, the Online Film Critics Society released its list of the Top 100 Animated Features of All Time, where The Powerpuff Girls Movie was placed at number 86. Later that year, the film was one of the several recipients of the Epic Award, as given by The White House Project to promote female leadership in the media. In 2019, Paste magazine ranked the film number 72 on its list of the 100 best superhero movies of all time.

== See also ==
- List of films based on Hanna-Barbera cartoons
- Impact of the September 11 attacks on the entertainment industry
