= Social Dancing =

Studio album by Bis
- Released: 22 March 1999 (Scotland); 10 August 1999 (US)
- Recorded: Apollo (Glasgow)
- Genres: Pop, punk, trip hop
- Length: 42:30
- Label: Wiiija
- Producer: Andy Gill

Bis chronology
Intendo (1998)	Social Dancing (1999)	Play Some Real Songs: the Live Album (2001)

Social Dancing is the second studio album by the Scottish musical trio Bis, released in 1999.

== Critical reception ==
Professional ratings
Review scores
Source	Rating
AllMusic	4/5 stars
Robert Christgau	(2-star Honorable Mention)
Pitchfork	5.1/10
Spin	6/10

The Austin Chronicle thought that "while Social Dancing is enjoyable as a hyperactive whirl through Brit-pop forms of the Eighties and early Nineties, this homage to the material world lacks the rebel edge of the band's earlier work." Rolling Stone noted that "this time the guitars are tuned, the drum-machine beats are smoother, and the pep-rally yelps are more determinedly melodic."

Tim Sendra of AllMusic wrote that Bis "tried a whole bunch of different stuff, from more punky rave-ups to slinky trip-hop, and if the end result is a little scattered, it's also an enjoyable mess."

== Track listing ==
All songs written by Bis unless otherwise indicated.

1. "Making People Normal" – 2:28
2. "I'm a Slut" – 2:44
3. "Eurodisco" – 4:41
4. "Action and Drama" – 2:29
5. "Theme from Tokyo" (Bis, Virgin Stigma) – 2:40
6. "The Hit Girl" – 3:01
7. "Am I Loud Enough?" – 3:12
8. "Shopaholic" – 2:41
9. "Young Alien Types" – 3:11
10. "Detour" (Bis, Lois Maffeo) – 4:58
11. "Sale or Return" (Bis, John Cacavas) – 2:58
12. "It's All New" – 3:21
13. "Listen Up" – 2:20
- This is the UK/US CD release and matches the UK/US 12-inch release.
- The Japanese release adds the songs "Germfree Adolescents" (originally by X-Ray Spex) and "Famous (Andy Gill Version)" to the end.
- "Action and Drama" contains a sample of "New Breed" by the Mackenzies.
- "Theme from Tokyo" contains a sample of "Groupie Girl" by Virgin Stigma.
- "Sale or Return" contains a sample of "Agent Who" by John Cacavas.

== Personnel ==
Bis

- John Disco
- Manda Rin
- Sci-Fi Steven

Additional musicians

- Lois Maffeo – vocals on "Detour"
- Vincent Flaming – violin on "Theme from Tokyo"
- Alan Mason – violin on "Theme from Tokyo"
- Helen Mosherry – cello on "Theme from Tokyo"
- Martin Wiggins – viola on "Theme from Tokyo"
- Andy Gill – occasional guitar and keyboards
- Rik Flick – occasional guitar and keyboards
- Richie Dempsey – drum kit sample

Technical

- Andy Gill – producer
- Rik Flick – engineer
- Jason Famous – additional engineering
- Bob Kraushaar – mixing
- Joe Dilworth – photography
- Manda Rin – artwork
- Alison Fielding – artwork

== Charts ==
Chart (1999)	Peak position
Japan Oricon Album Chart	60
UK Albums Chart	161
