= DIY (magazine) =

British music magazine

- Editor: Sarah Jamieson
- Former editors: Stephen Ackroyd
- Categories: Music magazine
- Frequency: Monthly
- Publisher: DIY Music Limited
- First issue: April 2011 (print)
- Country: United Kingdom
- Language: English
- Website: diymag.com
- OCLC: 1063477198

DIY is a British music publication launched in 2002 and available in print and online. Starting in 2011, a print edition has been released monthly available in UK venues, clubs and shops. The organisation also hosts live music events and has a record label.

== DIY Magazine ==
DIY was launched in 2002 by then-editor Stephen Ackroyd & Emma Swann as an online-only publication. Called This Is Fake DIY, named after a song by Scottish indie pop band Bis and staffed largely by a freelance writing team from around the globe. The website features music news and reviews.

In September 2007, DIY was nominated for Best Music Magazine at the annual BT Digital Music Awards, where it was described as "a great mix of humour and pop culture that has become the envy of the internet."

In April 2011, DIY started a free monthly music magazine. Cover acts have included Paramore, Mumford and Sons, Biffy Clyro, Jamie xx, Years & Years, LCD Soundsystem, Fall Out Boy, and Bastille.

On 11 March 2013, DIY started a weekly magazine in addition to the print title, published via tablet computer and iPhone - this was later pulled in favour of limited edition, one-off titles. Superfood and METZ have both released limited edition 'zines' in collaboration with DIY as part of this.

In June 2014, DIY rebranded, dropping the "This Is Fake" and launching its new official website, diymag.com.

== DIY Presents ==
DIY host live shows across the UK under the name DIY Presents.

Every January (since at least 2013), they run shows under the Hello moniker, previewing new acts at London's The Old Blue Last pub. Previous acts to play at Hello shows include Wolf Alice, Girl Band and Spring King.

In October 2014, DIY worked with PledgeMusic for a UK-wide DIY Presents tour, culminating in an all-dayer held at London venue The Laundry on 1 November. The tour was opened by local acts, as picked via fan-vote, and headlined by Shy Nature and Flyte. The all-dayer was headlined by JAWS, and featured Menace Beach, Spring King, Hinds and many more.

In the autumn of 2015, DIY Presents hosted a new music called Neu Tour 2015, which saw VANT, The Big Moon and Inheaven tour the country, culmating in a London date at Camden's Dingwalls.

== This Is Fake DIY Records ==
In 2007 DIY started a record label. Its roster included Duels, Heads We Dance, Manda Rin, Model Horror, Love Ends Disaster!, Popular Workshop, The Research, The Victorian English Gentlemens Club, We Are The Physics and You Animals.
