= The New Transistor Heroes =

Studio album by Bis
- Released: 7 April 1997
- Studio: Apollo (Glasgow)
- Genre: Pop punk
- Length: 53:52
- Label: Wiiija
- Producer: Rik Flick

Bis chronology
This Is Teen-C Power! (1996)	The New Transistor Heroes (1997)	Intendo (1998)

The New Transistor Heroes is the debut studio album by the Scottish band Bis. It was released on 7 April 1997.

The intro to the opening song "Tell It to the Kids" was recorded by a friend of the band, Mark Percival, credited in the album notes as Marky P.

== Critical reception ==
Professional ratings
Review scores
Source	Rating
AllMusic	3.5/5 stars
Entertainment Weekly	B+
NME	7/10
Pitchfork	8.6/10
Rolling Stone	3/5 stars
Select	1/5
The Village Voice	A−
Wall of Sound	71/100

The Independent wrote: "The group Bis most resemble, in style and sound, is X-Ray Spex, but it's a resemblance bereft of any acknowledgement of what it means to mimic those attitudes in the late Nineties. Not only is the music a shrill imitation of late-Seventies punk ... but the targets are punk targets, too."

== Track listing ==
All tracks are written by Bis.

No.	Title	Length
1.	"Tell It to the Kids"	3:06
2.	"Sweet Shop Avengerz"	2:41
3.	"Starbright Boy"	3:39
4.	"Popstar Kill"	2:33
5.	"Mr. Important"	3:01
6.	"Antiseptic Poetry"	3:05
7.	"Popyura"	1:57
8.	"Skinny Tie SenSurround"	3:50
9.	"Poster Parent"	2:07
10.	"Monstarr"	3:10
11.	"Everybody Thinks That They're Going to Get Theirs"	2:29
12.	"Rebel Soul"	5:02
13.	"Photoshop"	3:09
14.	"X-Defect"	3:09
15.	"Lie Detector Test"	3:44
16.	"Dinosaur Germs"	1:49

=== Notes ===
- This is the UK CD release; it matches the UK and US LP releases.
- The US LP came with a bonus 7-inch with the songs "Kkeerroolleeeenn", "Team Theme" and "Rollerblade Zero".
- The US and Australian CD releases add the songs "Team Theme", "Rollerblade Zero" and "Kkeerroolleeeenn" to the end. "Kkeerroolleeeenn" is an unlisted "hidden" track.
- The Thai CD release adds the song "Kandy Pop" to the end.
- The Japanese CD release adds the songs "Kandy Pop", "This Is Fake D.I.Y" and "School Disco" to the end.
- The Japanese MiniDisc release features only the songs found on the UK CD.
- The Australian 2CD release includes all tracks from the UK CD, plus "Kkeerroolleeeenn" on disc 1, and a repackaged version of the Sweet Shop Avengerz EP as disc 2 (five tracks only).

== Personnel ==
Bis

- Manda Rin
- John Disco
- Sci-Fi Steven

Technical

- Rik Flick – producer, engineer
- Manda Rin – artwork

== Charts ==
Chart (1997)	Peak position
Japanese Albums (Oricon)	19
Scottish Albums (Official Charts)	50
UK Albums (Official Charts)	55
