= Return to Central =

Return To Central

Studio album by Bis
- Released: September 2001
- Studio: Apollo, Glasgow, Scotland
- Genre: Electropop, synthpop, indie pop, new wave, post-Britpop
- Length: 61:34
- Label: spinART
- Producer: Bis, Jason Famous

Bis chronology
Play Some Real Songs: the Live Album (2001)	Return To Central (2001)	Plastique Nouveau (2002)

Professional ratings
Review scores
Source	Rating
Allmusic	link
Blender	3/5 stars
Robert Christgau	link

Return to Central is the third studio album by the Scottish pop group Bis. It was released in 2001 and includes the single "The End Starts Today".

The hair of the girl on the cover was different depending on the region of the release. The UK and United States versions had red covers, while Australia's was blue, Japan's was purple, other parts of Europe's were green.

== Track listing ==
All tracks written and composed by Bis, except for "Love Will Tear Us Apart" written by Curtis, Hook, Morris, Sumner.

1. "What You're Afraid Of" – 7:11
2. "Silver Spoon" – 4:16
3. "Black Pepper" – 0:54
4. "The End Starts Today" – 5:06
5. "Protection" – 4:36
6. "Two Million" – 6:35
7. "Chicago" – 5:55
8. "Metal Box" – 0:57
9. "We're Complicated" – 5:11
10. "Robotic" – 4:27
11. "A Portrait From Space" – 4:32

=== Notes ===
- The above is the USA CD release, it differs from the USA Vinyl-LP release. The Vinyl-LP version adds the songs "Make It Through" and "Robotic (Just Last Week) (Syndrum Mix)" to the end of the track order.
- The UK and Australian CD and Vinyl-LP releases add the songs "Make It Through" and "Don't Let The Rain Come Down" to the end. The UK version also features the Joy Division cover "Love Will Tear Us Apart" as hidden track number 14.
- The Japanese release adds the songs "Protection (HR-16 Version)", "The European (12" Version)" & "Love Will Tear Us Apart").

== Personnel ==
- Bis – producer (all tracks)
- Jason Famous – producer (all tracks except "Make It Through" and "Love Will Tear Us Apart")
- Johnny Brady – bass ("The End Starts Today")
- Stuart Braithwaite – additional vocals ("Robotic")
- Jayne Duncan – photography
- Manda – art
