= Data Panik Etcetera =

Studio album by Bis
- Released: 5 May 2014
- Recorded: 2003–2014
- Genre: Indie, electropop, pop punk
- Length: 42:58
- Label: Do Yourself In
- Producer: Bis, Todd Kinnon & Kurt-Pagen Davies

Bis chronology
We Are Bis from Glasgow, Scotland (2007)	Data Panik Etcetera (2014)	Slight Disconnects (2019)

Professional ratings
Review scores
Source	Rating
AllMusic	4/5 stars
Drowned in Sound	8/10
musicOMH	4/5 stars
The Skinny	3/5 stars

Data Panik Etcetera (stylised as data Panik etcetera) is an album by the Scottish pop group Bis, released in 2014. The album was the group's first since the band broke up in 2003.

The album is a compilation of material from sessions for different projects, including the post-Bis bands Data Panik; some tracks, such as "Control the Radical", "Cubis (I Love You)", had been previously released.

== Critical reception ==
The Line of Best Fit wrote: "Where the album's first songs were both a timely update of the bis sound, and a friendly reminder of what made them great, most of the rest of the album simply sounds like it’s treading water in a sea of four-to-the-floor rhythms and Microkorg presets."

== Track listing ==
No.	Title	Length
1.	"Control the Radical"	3:28
2.	"Minimum Wage"	3:20
3.	"Rulers and the States"	2:46
4.	"Cubis (I Love You)"	3:52
5.	"Sense Not Sense"	3:31
6.	"Mechanical Love"	2:52
7.	"Too Much Not Enough"	4:31
8.	"Retail of the Detail"	3:05
9.	"Music Lovers"	4:05
10.	"The Young Mothers"	3:15
11.	"Flesh Remover"	3:56
12.	"(That Love Ain't) Justified"	4:13
