= Bis (Scottish band) =

Scottish indie pop band

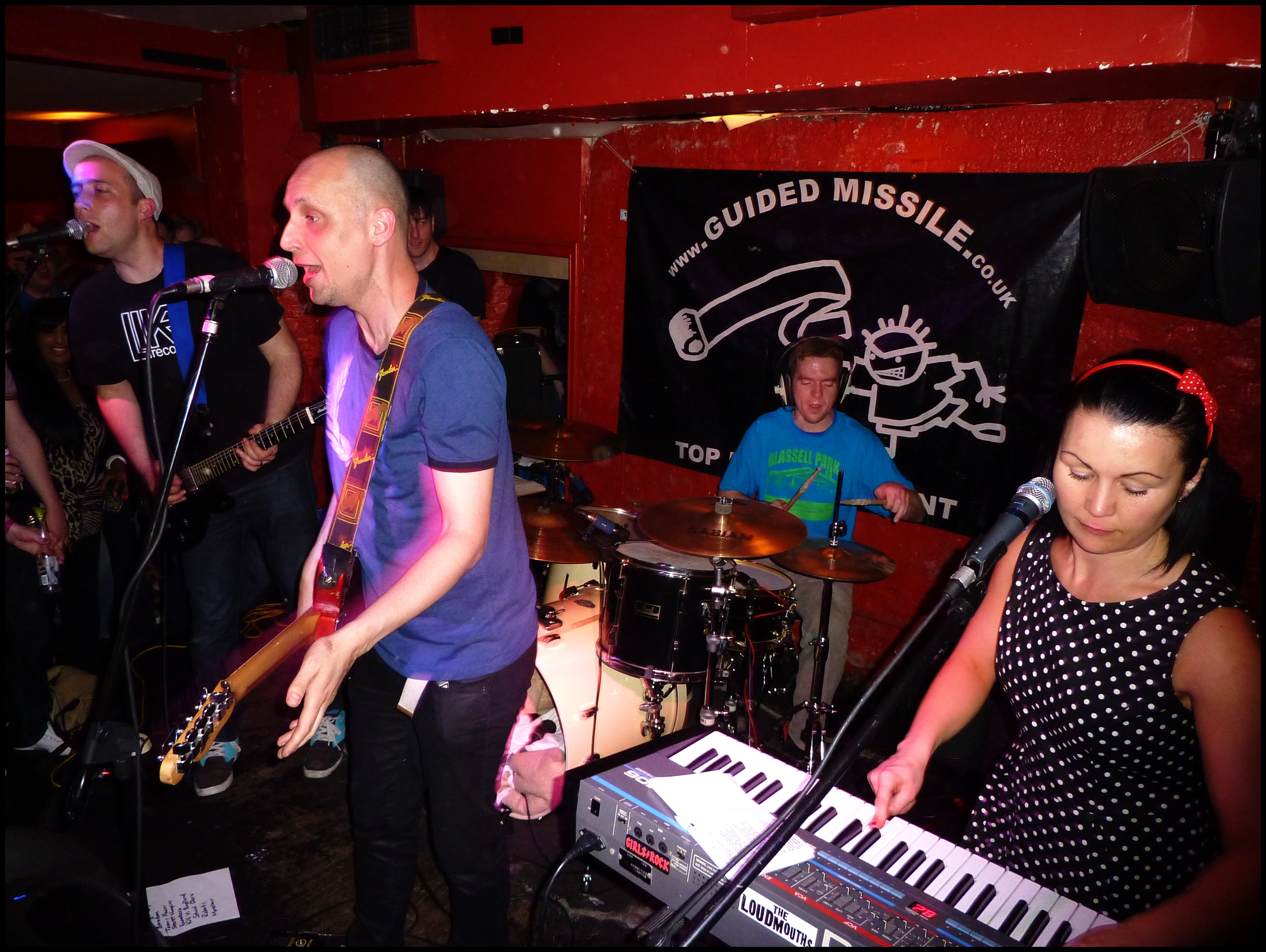
- Bis performing at London's Buffalo Bar in 2012. L-R: John Disco, Sci-fi Steven, Manda Rin.

Background information
- Origin: Giffnock, Renfrewshire, Scotland
- Genres: Pop punk; electropop; indie pop; Britpop; synth-pop
- Years active: 1994–2003; 2007; 2009–present
- Labels: Chemikal Underground; Grand Royal; spinART; Lookout!; Wiiija; PolyGram; Do Yourself In; Last Night From Glasgow
- Members: Steven Clark; John Clark; Amanda MacKinnon
- Past members: Stuart Memo; Graham Christie
- Website: bisnation.com

Bis (/bɪs/ BISS, stylised in all lowercase) are a Scottish indie pop band composed of Steven Clark (Sci-Fi Steven), John Clark (John Disco), and Amanda MacKinnon (Manda Rin), formed in 1994. The band's name, rhyming with 'this', derives from "black iron skyline", a lyric from the song "Twilight of a Champion" by The The.

After releasing numerous EPs and three studio albums, The New Transistor Heroes (1997), Social Dancing (1999), and Return to Central (2001), the band broke up in 2003, but re-formed briefly in 2007 for a series of concerts. In 2009, they re-formed again and released the album data Panik etcetera (2014).

In 2019, the band's lineup returned to the original core three-piece and released the album Slight Disconnects. In 2021, the band self-released Low Level (A Return To Central Travel Companion), a CD consisting of previously unreleased material recorded during the Return To Central sessions. In October 2022, Systems Music For Home Defence was released, which Sci-Fi Steven has described as the band's "rave" album.

== History ==
=== 1994–1997: Formation and early history ===
The three musicians formed Bis in late 1994 while Rin and Disco were in secondary school, Woodfarm High School, and Steven who had recently finished there. After releasing their first singles Transmissions On The Teen-C Tip! and Disco Nation 45 the following year, they appeared on BBC Television's Top of the Pops in 1996 performing "Kandy Pop" from their The Secret Vampire Soundtrack EP ahead of its release. Bis were the first unsigned band to perform on Top of the Pops. "Kandy Pop" came 49th in a reader poll of the "50 Greatest Britpop Songs Ever" by NME.

Bis released a number of EPs (The Secret Vampire Soundtrack, Bis vs. The D.I.Y Corps, Atom-Powered Action! and This Is Teen-C Power!), three of which entered the UK Singles Chart in 1996, followed by several singles between 1997 and 1999. They contributed a song to the Gary Numan tribute album Random in 1997. Two of the band's early releases (Disco Nation 45 and The Secret Vampire Soundtrack) were on Glasgow's Chemikal Underground label, run by the Delgados, and the band released one EP (Bis Vs. The D.I.Y Corps) on their own Teen-C Recordings label, before they transferred to Wiiija where labelmates included Cornershop. In the United States, their records appeared on the underground label K Records, and on the Beastie Boys' Grand Royal label.

They toured extensively both in the UK and abroad, their diverse influences reflected in the kinds of acts they appeared with; Foo Fighters, Garbage, Gary Numan, and Pavement amongst them. The group became a favourite of the likes of Blur, John Peel and Green Day, despite a particularly hostile review by Steven Wells in the New Musical Express entitled "The Sinking of the Bis Lark".

Sleeve artwork for the band's early releases featured a consistent "cut’n’paste" visual aesthetic and typewritten text in line with the band's interests in zine culture, DIY and punk. The band produced the fanzines Funky Spunk and Paper Bullets and advertised these in record liner notes. Manda Rin's manga-influenced artwork adorned early record sleeves contributing to a defiantly "twee" and self-consciously "cute" aesthetic.

The band was heavily influenced by the approach of cult punk band The Nation Of Ulysses. Liner notes often made reference to "The Teen-C Tip" and outlined the band's vision for a "Teen-C Revolution" involving various factions in the Bis canon such as the "Disco Nation", "Secret Vampires", "Atom-Powered Action Gang", "Icky-Poo Air Raiderz", "Sweet Shop Avengerz", "New Transistor Heroes" and the "D.I.Y Corps". The Teen-C Revolution (and its adherents, the "Teen-C Nation") effectively advocated for self-empowerment, independence and perpetual adolescence (as well as the right to enjoy both disco and punk) - in part it was an embrace of "deceptively dangerous" cuteness, the positive energy of youthful exuberance, a knee-jerk rejection of enforced maturity and the dour responsibilities of adulthood, and a rallying cry against blandness, normality and "yr geetarawk".

Songs that directly mention Teen-C include "Teen-C Power", "Team Theme", "Tell It To The Kids", "Sweet Shop Avengerz", "Rebel Soul", "Ninja Hi Skool" and "Cliquesuck".

=== 1997–2003: Rise to fame and breakup ===
From 1997 to 2001, Bis released three mainstream albums: The New Transistor Heroes (1997), Social Dancing (1999), and Return to Central (2001). A compilation of non-album tracks entitled Intendo was released in 1998. That same year Manda Rin contributed vocals to the J Church album Cat Food. The band enjoyed a period of success in Japan, selling nearly 100,000 copies of their debut album in its first week of release, but future releases failed to match its success in Japan. The single "Eurodisco", from Social Dancing, became a minor success for the band in Australia as well as the UK. Their single "Detour" was also given some radio airplay in the U.S. and was included in the 2000 film Bring It On. The six-track EP Music For A Stranger World was released in 2000 and featured increasing electronic elements which would later become more prominent on Return To Central. Also in 2000, Sci-Fi Steven (adopting the pseudonym "Marco Stiletto") formed the duo Italian Electro with partner "Angelino Vampyro" - Catmobile Records released their sole output (the track "Don’t Come Back Alone") that year on a split 7-inch with Kumari.

Bis gained some American popularity in 1998, when they were asked by Craig McCracken to write and record the theme song for the American animated series The Powerpuff Girls. They also did a punk version of the theme for 2002's The Powerpuff Girls Movie. The four-song EP Fukd I.D. #5 was released in 2001 through Chemikal Underground. Bis contributed a remix of their song "Statement of Intent" to the 2002 game Jet Set Radio Future. The four-song 12-inch EP Fact 2002 paying tribute to Factory Records was released in 2002 through Optimo Singles Club and featured cover versions of Joy Division, New Order, A Certain Ratio and Section 25. The band broke up in March 2003, after playing a farewell show at King Tut's Wah Wah Hut.

=== 2003–2009: Solo projects ===
The band members remained active in the local music scene. Steven and John Disco produced music together as the duo Dirty Hospital (releasing multiple 12-inchs on their own label Rottenrow Records) and Rin acted as a DJ. Disco (with Ally Christie) formed Kempston, Protek & Fuller who released the 12-inch Fukd I.D. #8 - 12k Boost Boost in 2003 on Chemikal Underground. Rin was also in a duo called The Kitchen with Ryan Seagrist of Discount (debut album Foreign Objects released on Damaged Goods in 2004), whilst Disco joined the ska band, The Amphetameanies, which included members of Belle & Sebastian, Franz Ferdinand and Pink Kross. Also in 2004 Rin contributed vocals to the album I Met The Music by Meister.

In 2005, the band announced on the official Bis website that together they had formed a new band called data Panik, with Stuart Memo on bass and drummer Graham Christie. After releasing two 7-inch singles, however, this band split up. Also in 2005, Bis performed in animated form on the CBBC children's cartoon BB3B.

In 2006, Rin was working on solo material. The following year, she teamed up with the Scottish electro-pop outfit Juno!, and has collaborated on their independently released singles, "Smoke & Mirrors" and "These Boys Are Athletes", as well as regularly appearing live with the band, most recently at the Rock Ness 2008 Festival.

To celebrate the 10-year anniversary of the release of their debut album The New Transistor Heroes, Bis reformed in April 2007 for three shows in Glasgow, Manchester, and London. A greatest hits compilation, titled We Are Bis from Glasgow, Scotland, was released on compact disc to coincide with these shows.

In August 2008, Rin released the solo single "DNA", which she followed up with the release of her debut album, My DNA with This Is Fake DIY in September 2008.

In 2009, Disco (using the moniker John Hospital) released a digital-only solo EP The Truant on Pest Control Records.

=== 2009–2017: Reunion to Data Panik Etcetera ===
In November 2009, Rin announced that the band would reform to play at the Primavera Festival in May 2010, returning this time with a bassist and drummer, former data Panik members, Stuart Memo and Graham Christie, respectively.

Also in 2009, Rin provided the artwork for an iPhone game called "All Fridges Are Psychotic".

Rin made two guest appearances on the BBC music quiz programme Never Mind the Buzzcocks (on 18 November 2010 and 19 January 2011). She also teamed up with Hyperbubble on a track for their 2011 album Drastic Cinematic. Rin would go on to work with Hyperbubble again on the 2013 EP Hyperbubble + Manda Rin. Around 2011 John Disco began releasing solo electronic material under the moniker Debukas, with his debut solo LP I Am Machinery appearing in 2013 on the label 20:20 Vision.

In 2013, Rin contributed lead vocals to the track "Crack On, Have A Booze" which appeared on the album Why Do Birds Suddenly Appear by punk rock/oi! band Hard Skin.

In February 2014, Bis announced they would release their fourth album, data Panik etcetera, on 15 May on Rough Trade Records. The album was made available for streaming at NME on 28 April.

The same year, the band's first three albums were re-released as double CD deluxe editions by the Do Yourself In label.

In 2015, Sci-Fi Steven began releasing solo material under the moniker Batteries with Do Yourself In Records releasing the self-titled debut album Batteries in 2015 and sophomore album The Finishing Line in 2016.

=== 2017–present: Slight Disconnects, Systems Music For Home Defence and beyond ===
In October 2017, the band announced that they were working on their fifth album. Slight Disconnects was released in February 2019 on Last Night From Glasgow. They also returned to a three piece with only Manda, John and Steven being in the lineup.

In 2020, Last Night From Glasgow released Music For Animations, an archival album consisting of the music recorded for the CBBC kids cartoon BB3B.

In 2021, the band self-released a cassette-only live album The Fan Club Tapes Vol. 1 - Live In Toulouse 1997 and Komponist released Low Level (A Return To Central Travel Companion) - a collection of previously unreleased material recorded parallel to Return To Central.

In October 2022, the album Systems Music For Home Defence was released on Last Night From Glasgow.

== Members ==
- Manda Rin – vocals, keyboards, drums (1994–2003; 2007; 2009–present)
- Sci-Fi Steven – vocals, guitar, keyboards (1994–2003; 2007; 2009–present)
- John Disco – vocals, guitar, bass guitar (1994–2003; 2007; 2009–present)
- Stuart Memo – bass guitar (2009–2014)
- Graham Christie – drums (2009–2014)

== Discography ==
Bis discography
- Studio albums: 6
- EPs: 14
- Soundtrack albums: 1
- Live albums: 2
- Compilation albums: 7
- Singles: 17
- Music videos: 13

=== Studio albums ===
Title	Album details	Chart positions		
Title	Album details	UK	JPN	SCO
The New Transistor Heroes	Released: 7 April 1997; Labels: Wiiija, Grand Royal/Capitol, Tristar/Sony	55	19	50
Social Dancing	Released: 22 March 1999; Labels: Wiiija, Grand Royal/Capitol, V2	161	60	—
Return to Central	Released: 18 September 2001; Labels: spinART, Apex, Tilt	—	—	—
data Panik etcetera	Released: 5 May 2014; Labels: Do Yourself In	—	—	—
Slight Disconnects	Released: 15 February 2019; Labels: Last Night From Glasgow	—	—	—
Systems Music for Home Defence	Releases: 28 October 2022; Labels: Last Night From Glasgow	—	—	—
"—" denotes a recording that did not chart or was not released in that territory.

=== Live albums ===
- Play Some Real Songs: A Bis Live CD (2001, only sold through the Bis website)
- The Fan Club Tapes Vol. 1 - Live In Toulouse 1997 (2021, self-released, cassette only, limited to 100 copies)

=== Compilation albums ===
- Icky-Poo Air Raid (1997, Rock)
- Intendo (1998, Grand Royal)
- I Love Bis (2001, EMI)
- Plastique Nouveau (2002, spinART)
- We Are Bis from Glasgow, Scotland (2007, Cherry Red)
- The Anthology - 20 Years of Antiseptic Poetry (2014, Do Yourself In Records)
- Low Level (A Return To Central Travel Companion) (2021, Komponist)

=== Soundtrack albums ===
- Music For Animations (2020, Last Night From Glasgow)

=== Extended plays ===
- Transmissions on the Teen-C Tip! (1995, Acuarela)
- Disco Nation 45 (1995, Chemikal Underground)
- The Secret Vampire Soundtrack (1996, Chemikal Underground) UK No. 25, SCO No. 16
- Bis vs. the D.I.Y. Corps (1996, teen-c recordings) UK No. 45, SCO No. 47
- Atom-Powered Action! (1996, Wiiija) UK No. 54, SCO No. 29
- This Is Teen-C Power! (1996, Grand Royal)
- Techno Disco Lovers (1999, V2 & PIAS)
- Music for a Stranger World (2000, Wiiija, Lookout! & V2)
- fukd ID No. 5 (2001, Chemikal Underground)
- Fact 2002 (2001, Optimo Singles Club and Other Related Recordings)
- Plastique 33 (2002, spinART)
- Mechanical Love (2014, Do Yourself In Records)
- You Wrecked My Christmas (2017, Last Night From Glasgow, Snowflake)
- John Peel Session 14.10.95 (2023, Precious Recordings Of London)
- John Peel Session 16.06.96 (2023, Precious Recordings Of London)

=== Singles ===
- "Sweet Shop Avengerz" (1997, Tristar/Sony) – (1997, Wiiija) UK No. 46, SCO No. 37
- "Everybody Thinks That They're Going to Get Theirs" (1997, Wiiija & Shock) – (1997, Tristar/Sony) UK No. 64, SCO No. 56
- "Tell It to the Kids" (1997, Sony Japan)
- "Kid Cut (Demo Version)" (1997) (One-sided 7-inch single given out at gigs in Glasgow and London)
- "Eurodisco" (1998, Wiiija, Grand Royal/Capitol) UK No. 37, AUS No. 54, BE No. 41, SCO No. 27
- "Action and Drama" (1999, Wiiija, Shock) UK No. 50, SCO No. 45
- "Detour" (1999, Wiiija & Grand Royal) UK No. 80, SCO No. 72
- "What You're Afraid Of" (2001, spinART)
- "Protection" (2001, Tilt)
- "The End Starts Today" (2002, Artful)
- "Rulers and the States" (2014, Rough Trade)
- "Keep Your Darkness" (2014, Do Yourself In Records)
- "Minimum Wage" (2014, Do Yourself In Records)
- "Twilight Cafe" (2014, Do Yourself In Records)

=== Split singles ===
- Ché Trading Limited Presents… Bis and The Golden Mile versus The Delgados and Merzbow 2×7″: "In Stealth" – The Golden Mile b/w "I’ve Only Just Started To Breathe" – The Delgados and "Icky-Poo Air Raid" – Bis b/w "Iro Moyo" – Merzbow (1995, Ché Trading)
- "Trophy Girlfriend" – Heavenly b/w "Keroleen" – Bis (1996, K)
- "Pop Song" / "Clockwork Punk" – Bis b/w "Rococo Neggro" / "Harrap Ageing Fast" – Lugworm (1997, Guided Missile)
- "Signal in the Sky (Let's Go)" – The Apples in Stereo b/w "The Powerpuff Girls (End Theme)" – Bis (2000, Kid Rhino)
- "Minimum Wage" – Bis b/w "Hair Metal Shame" – Ghosts of Dead Airplanes (2014, Do Yourself In Records)
- "Boredom Could Be Good For You" – Bis b/w "Tear It Up And Start Again" – Big Zero (2016, Do Yourself In Records)
- "Opposites Attract" – Bis b/w "Make Your Own Kind of Music" – Art Brut (2025, Alcopop! Records)

=== Various artist compilations ===
- Disco Sucks (1996, Ché Trading) – "Icky-Poo Air Raid"
- Songs About Plucking (1996, Fierce Panda) – "Super James"
- The Smiths Is Dead (1996, Small Records) – "The Boy with the Thorn in His Side"
- Casper: A Spirited Beginning: The Soundtrack (1997, EMI-Capitol) – "Kandy Pop"
- Random (1997, Beggars Banquet) – "We Are So Fragile"
- Uproar - 17 Indie Essentials (1998, BBC Radio 1/MCI) – "Kill Yr Boyfriend (Live)"
- At Home with the Groovebox (2000, Grand Royal) – "Oh My"
- The Powerpuff Girls – Heroes and Villains (2000, Rhino Entertainment) – "Fight the Power" and "The Powerpuff Girls (End Theme)"
- The Powerpuff Girls – The City of Soundsville (2001, Rhino Entertainment) – "Super Secret City of Soundsville Song"
- The Powerpuff Girls – Power Pop (2003, Rhino Entertainment) – "Powerpunk End Theme"
- Last Night From Glasgow Isolation Sessions - March and April 2020 (2020, Last Night From Glasgow) – "Dial Up Internet Is The Purest Internet"

=== Music videos ===
- "Kandy Pop" (1996)
- "This Is Fake D.I.Y" (1996)
- "Starbright Boy" (1997)
- "Sweet Shop Avengerz" (1997)
- "Tell it to the Kids" (1997)
- "Everybody Thinks That They're Going to Get Theirs" (1997)
- "Eurodisco" (1998)
- "Action and Drama" (1999)
- "Detour" (1999)
- "The End Starts Today (Single Edit)" (2001)
- "Sound Of A Heartbreak" (2019)
- "There Is No Point (Other Than The Point That There Is No Point)" (2019)
- "Lucky Night" (2022)
