= The Secret Vampire Soundtrack =

EP by Bis
- Released: March 1996
- Recorded: December 1995 at MCM, Hamilton, Scotland
- Genre: Electropop, pop punk, indie pop
- Label: Chemikal Underground

Bis chronology
Disco Nation 45 (1995)	The Secret Vampire Soundtrack (1996)	Bis vs. the D.I.Y. Corps (1996)

Professional ratings
Review scores
Source	Rating
AllMusic	2.5/5 stars

The Secret Vampire Soundtrack is an EP released by the Scottish indie pop band Bis in 1996. It launched the band into the public eye with the song "Kandy Pop". It was released in 4 formats, 7 inch and 12 inch vinyl records, cassette tape and compact disc.

== Track listing ==
All tracks written by Bis.

1. "Kandy Pop" (2:47)
2. "Secret Vampires" (2:36)
3. "Teen-C Power" (2:41)
4. "Diska" (3:02)

== Personnel ==
- Recorded by - Richie Dempsey and Paul Savage

== Charts ==
Chart (1996)	Peak position
UK Singles Chart	25
Scottish Singles Chart	16
