= James L. Venable =

- Born: James Lewis Venable; May 19, 1967 (age 59); Santa Monica, California, U.S.
- Genre: Film score
- Occupation: Film composer
- Years active: 1998–present

James Lewis Venable (born May 19, 1967) is an American composer, working primarily in American film and television. He is known for his scores to the animated television series The Powerpuff Girls, Samurai Jack, and Foster's Home for Imaginary Friends. The latter was nominated for an Emmy Award for Outstanding Main Title Theme Music in 2005, the same score won a 2005 Annie Award—Venable's third—for achievement in music for an animated series. Among Venable's feature film scores are Jay and Silent Bob Strike Back, Scary Movie 3, 4, and 5 and EuroTrip. On August 3, 2004, Venable released an electronica album titled Holding Space with Screaming Fan Records.

== Filmography ==
=== Film ===
Year	Film	Director	Note
2001	Iron Monkey	Yuen Woo-Ping	Composed score for U.S release
2001	Jay and Silent Bob Strike Back	Kevin Smith	1st of 6 collaborations with Smith
2002	The Powerpuff Girls Movie	Craig McCracken	—N/a
2003	Scary Movie 3	David Zucker	1st of 3 collaborations with Zucker
2004	EuroTrip	Jeff Schaffer	—N/a
2004	Jersey Girl	Kevin Smith	—N/a
2004	The Year of the Yao	Adam Del Deo; James D. Stern	Documentary film
2005	Deuce Bigalow: European Gigolo	Mike Bigelow	Themes music composed by John Debney
2005	Venom	Jim Gillespie	Themes music composed by John Debney
2006	Scary Movie 4	David Zucker	—N/a
2006	Clerks II	Kevin Smith	—N/a
2007	Kickin' It Old Skool	Harvey Glazer	—N/a
2007	The Last Day of Summer	Blair Treu	Television film
2008	Turok: Son of Stone	Curt Geda; Dan Riba; Frank Squillace; Tad Stones	—N/a
2008	Superhero Movie	Craig Mazin	—N/a
2008	Zack and Miri Make a Porno	Kevin Smith	—N/a
2008	An American Carol	David Zucker	—N/a
2009	Frequently Asked Questions About Time Travel	Gareth Carrivick	—N/a
2009	I Hope They Serve Beer in Hell	Bob Gosse	—N/a
2010	Justice League: Crisis on Two Earths	Sam Liu; Lauren Montgomery	Additional music by Christopher Drake
2013	Scary Movie 5	Malcolm D. Lee	—N/a
2013	Jay & Silent Bob's Super Groovy Cartoon Movie!	Steve Stark	—N/a
2018	Supercon	Zak Knutson	—N/a
2019	Jay and Silent Bob Reboot	Kevin Smith	—N/a
2022	Clerks III	Kevin Smith	—N/a

=== Television ===
Year	Film	Notes
1998–2005	The Powerpuff Girls	with Steve Rucker and Tom Chase
2000–2001	Clerks: The Animated Series	—N/a
2001–2004	Samurai Jack	with will.i.am
2002–2006	My Life as a Teenage Robot	with Paul Dinletir
2002–2003	3-South	—N/a
2003–2005	Star Wars: Clone Wars	with Paul Dinletir
2004–2009	Foster's Home for Imaginary Friends	with Jennifer Kes Remington
2008	The Mighty B!	First episode only "Original music" credit
2014–2017	Clarence	with Simon Panrucker

=== Video games ===
Year	Game	Notes
TBA	The Adventures of Breadman	
2007	Spider-Man: Friend or Foe	With Mike Reagan
