= Steve Rucker (composer) =

American composer (born 1949)

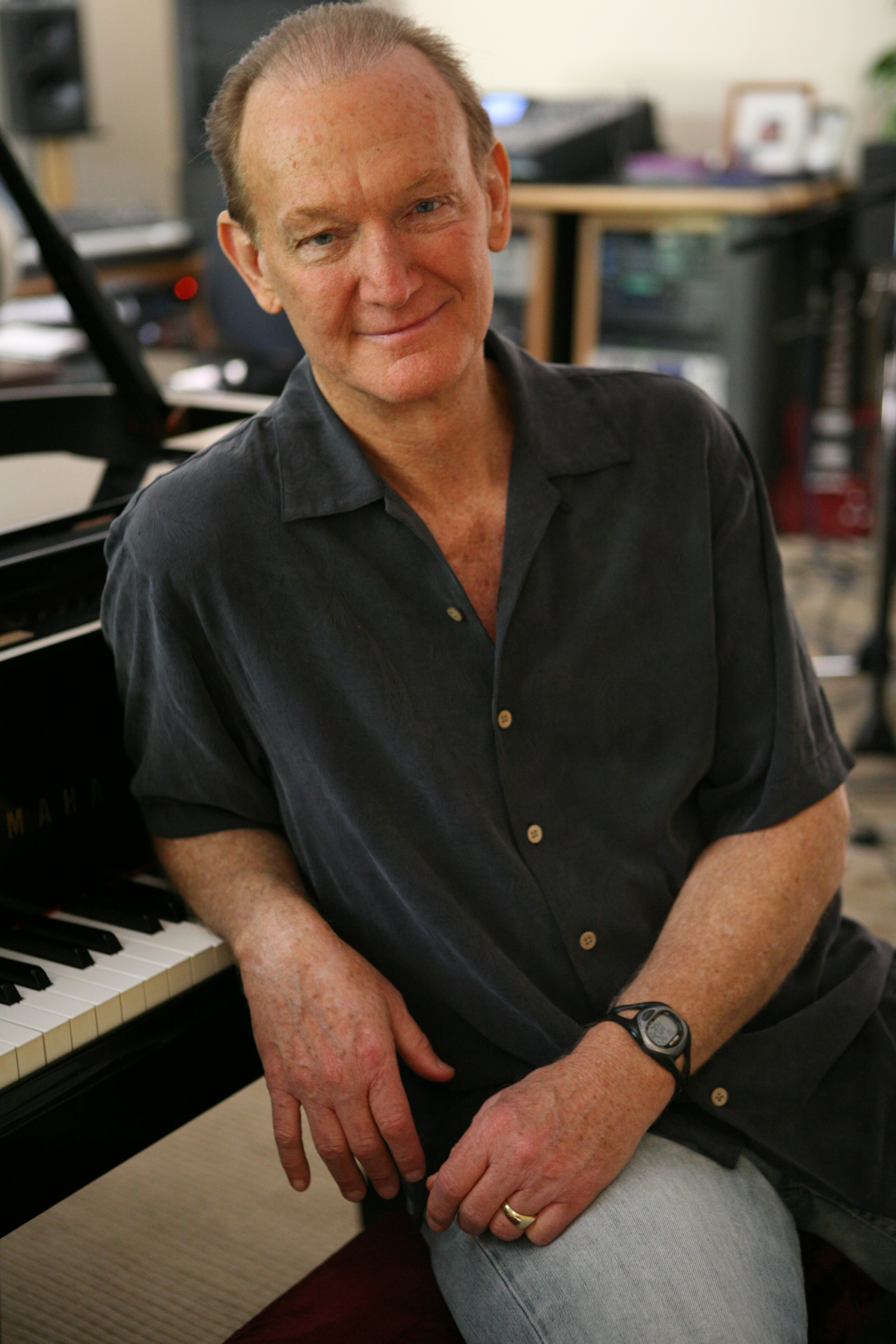
- Born: June 27, 1949 (age 77); Glendale, California, U.S.
- Occupation: Composer
- Website: Official website

Stephen Donald Rucker (born June 27, 1949) is an American composer. Rucker studied piano with M. Mendelsohn of the Paris Conservatory. He has composed and conducted for the London Symphony Orchestra in the animated film, Little Nemo: Adventures in Slumberland, with Thomas Chase. He has worked on film scores for animated series including Dexter's Laboratory, The Powerpuff Girls, and Jonny Quest. He also composed the score for another Cartoon Network series, Codename: Kids Next Door, with Thomas Chase. Rucker and Chase also provided musical score for Alvin and the Chipmunks.

He was awarded Best Original Score for the Civil War drama Josephine at the 2016 Richmond International Film Festival. He composed film trailer cues including work for Goldwing (1978) Coco, Pirates of the Caribbean: Dead Men Tell No Tales, Hidden Figures, Jack Reacher: Never Go Back and Designated Survivor (ABC). He also continues to contribute for reality TV including Survivor and The Dog Whisperer.

== Filmography ==
=== Television ===
Year	Title	Notes
1984	Mister T	
1985–1991	Adventures of the Gummi Bears	
1985	The Wuzzles	
1987	Bionic Six	
1987	Visionaries: Knights of the Magical Light	
1988–1990	Alvin and the Chipmunks	
1989	Hard Time on Planet Earth	episode: "Stranger in a Strange Land"
1989	Freddy's Nightmares	episode: "Photo Finish"
1990–1991	The Real Ghostbusters	
1990–1991	Timeless Tales from Hallmark	
1991–1993	The Pirates of Dark Water	
1993–1996	Captain Planet and the Planeteers	
1995–1996	What a Cartoon!	Episodes: "Dexter's Laboratory" segments, "Mina and the Count: Interlude with a Vampire", "Gramps"
1996–2003	Dexter's Laboratory	
1996–1997	The Real Adventures of Jonny Quest	Episodes: "Undersea Urgency" and "The Haunted Sonata"
1996–1997	Captain Simian & the Space Monkeys	
1998–2002	Oh Yeah! Cartoons	Episodes: "ChalkZone" segments, "Mina and the Count" segments, "Ask Edward: All About Babies", "Olly and Frank", "My Neighbor Was a Teenage Robot", "Baxter and Bananas: Monkey See, Monkey Don't!"
1998	Stories from My Childhood	
1998–2005	The Powerpuff Girls	
1999–2000	Detention	
2002–2007	Codename: Kids Next Door	

== Accolades ==
Date	Award	Category	Work	Shared with	Result	Ref.
1997	Daytime Emmy Awards	Outstanding Music Direction and Composition	The Real Adventures of Jonny Quest	Bodie Chandler, Gary Lionelli, Thomas Chase, Larry Brown, Guy Moon, Kevin Kiner, Mark Koval	Nominated	
1997	Annie Awards	Best Individual Achievement: Music in a TV Production	Dexter's Laboratory	Thomas Chase	Nominated	
1998	Annie Awards	Outstanding Individual Achievement for Music in an Animated Television Production	Dexter's Laboratory (for "LABretto")	Thomas Chase	Nominated	
2001	Annie Awards	Outstanding Individual Achievement for Music Score an Animated Television Production	The Powerpuff Girls (for "Meet the Beat-Alls")	James L. Venable and Thomas Chase	Won	
