= The Powerpuff Girls =

American animated superhero television series

- Genre: Action; Comedy; Superhero
- Created by: Craig McCracken
- Showrunners: Craig McCracken (seasons 1–4); Chris Savino (seasons 5–6)
- Directed by: Craig McCracken (seasons 1–4)
- Voices of: Cathy Cavadini; Tara Strong; E. G. Daily; Tom Kane; Tom Kenny; Roger L. Jackson
- Narrated by: Tom Kenny
- Theme music composer: Amanda MacKinnon; Steven Clark; John Clark; Thomas Chase; Steve Rucker; James L. Venable
- Opening theme: "The Powerpuff Girls (main theme)"
- Ending theme: "The Powerpuff Girls (end theme)" (performed by Bis)
- Composers: Thomas Chase; Steve Rucker; James L. Venable
- Country of origin: United States
- No. of seasons: 6
- No. of episodes: 78 (Note: The series contains 136 segments.) (list of episodes)

Production
- Executive producer: Craig McCracken (2001–2005)
- Producer: Chris Savino (2003–2005)
- Running time: 22 minutes (overall); 11 minutes (segments); 44 minutes ("'Twas the Fight Before Christmas")
- Production company: Cartoon Network Studios (Note: Produced under Hanna-Barbera Cartoons for seasons 1–4.)

Original release
- Network: Cartoon Network
- Release: November 18, 1998 – March 25, 2005

Related
- Space Ghost Coast to Coast; What a Cartoon!; Foster's Home for Imaginary Friends; Powerpuff Girls Z; The Powerpuff Girls (2016)

The Powerpuff Girls (Note: Also known simply as PPG.) is an American animated superhero television series created by Craig McCracken for Cartoon Network. The show centers on Blossom, Bubbles, and Buttercup, three kindergarten-aged girls with superpowers. They live in the fictional city of Townsville with their father and creator, a scientist named Professor Utonium, and are frequently called upon by the city's mayor to help fight nearby criminals and other enemies using their powers.

McCracken created a short film, Whoopass Stew!, about a trio of child superheroes known as the Whoopass Girls, which was only shown at festivals. Following his hiring by Hanna-Barbera, McCracken changed its name to The Powerpuff Girls and produced the series' pilot for their What a Cartoon! series, which premiered during the Space Ghost Coast to Coast episode "1st Annual World Premiere Toon-In" on February 20, 1995.

The Powerpuff Girls premiered on November 18, 1998, on Cartoon Network. It aired for six seasons, with the final episode airing on March 25, 2005. Along with two pilots, a feature-length film, and three specials, a total of 78 episodes were produced. It was nominated for six Emmy Awards, nine Annie Awards, and a Kids' Choice Award during its run.

Various spin-off media include an anime series, three soundtracks, various video games, and a 2016 reboot series, as well as various licensed merchandise. A planned live-action television series and a second reboot were cancelled.

== Premise ==
=== Characters ===
The Powerpuff Girls (from left to right: Bubbles, Blossom, and Buttercup)

The show revolves around the adventures of three kindergarten-aged girls with an array of various superpowers: Blossom (pink), Bubbles (blue), and Buttercup (green). As depicted in the opening sequence of each episode, the Powerpuff Girls were created by Professor Utonium in an attempt to create the "perfect little girl" using a mixture of sugar, spice, and everything nice. However, he accidentally spilled a mysterious substance called Chemical X into the mixture, creating three girls and granting them superpowers.

The Powerpuff Girls individually represent body, mind and spirit and adopt the characteristics of the oldest, middle and youngest child. Blossom is the red-haired "commander and leader" of the trio, who is known for her intelligence and for assuming responsibility of their public persona. Bubbles is an innocent blonde girl who is the most sensitive and emotional of the trio. She produces a high-pitched voice and tends to cry a lot. Buttercup is a black-haired tough tomboy who is known for her fighting abilities. The Powerpuff Girls attend Pokey Oaks Kindergarten, where they interact with other children and learn from their teacher Ms. Keane. As heroines they are crucial for the survival of Townsville and are cherished by most citizens. The Mayor of Townsville regularly calls them on the "Powerpuff" hotline for emergencies. Sara Bellum is the Mayor's dependable secretary whose face isn't shown on screen.

The Powerpuff Girls battle a variety of villains that make up their rogues gallery. These include their nemesis Mojo Jojo, an evil chimpanzee with a large mutated brain and high intelligence, who was Professor Utonium's assistant before he was accidentally spilled with Chemical X—the same accident that created the Powerpuff Girls; Fuzzy Lumpkins, a pink, furry hillbilly monster; the Amoeba Boys, three dimwitted, single-celled gangsters; "Him", a sinister demon who often plays mind games on the girls with his powers; Princess Morbucks, the spoiled daughter of Townsville's richest man who hates and envies the girls; and the Rowdyruff Boys, the Powerpuff Girls' evil counterparts created by Mojo using a mixture of "snips, snails, a puppy dog tail," and radioactive toilet water.

=== Setting ===
The show is set mainly in the city of Townsville, USA. Townsville is depicted as a major American city, with a cityscape consisting of several major skyscrapers. In his review of The Powerpuff Girls Movie, film critic Bob Longino of The Atlanta Journal-Constitution reviewed the series as "one of the few American creations that is both gleeful pop culture and exquisite high art", analyzing that the drawings "emanate 1950s futuristic pizzazz like a David Hockney scenescape."

== Episodes ==
| Season | Segments | Episodes | Originally released | |
| Season | Segments | Episodes | First released | Last released |
|---|---|---|---|---|
| 1 | 24 | 13 | November 18, 1998 | May 26, 1999 |
| 2 | 26 | 13 | June 25, 1999 | June 30, 2000 |
| 3 | 22 | 12 | July 28, 2000 | February 9, 2001 |
| 4 | 12 | 11 | April 14, 2001 | May 18, 2002 |
| 5 | 25 | 14 | December 6, 2002 | April 9, 2004 |
| 6 | 27 | 15 | April 16, 2004 | March 25, 2005 |
| Specials | N/A | 3 | December 12, 2003 | January 20, 2014 |

== Production ==
=== Development ===
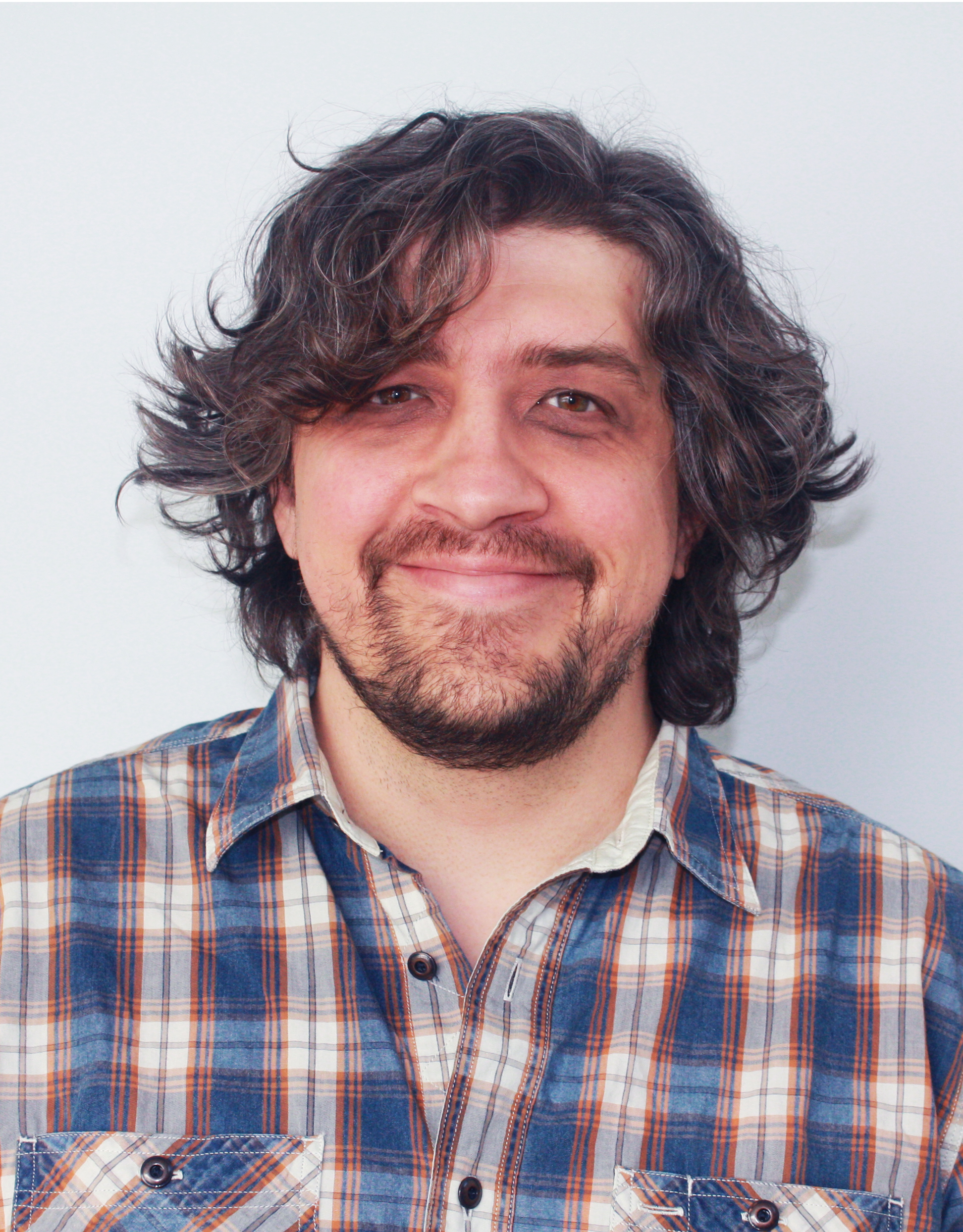
The Powerpuff Girls creator Craig McCracken in January 2012.

In 1991, Craig McCracken made a small drawing of three young girls—a blonde, a redhead, and a brunette—while attending the character animation program in the California Institute of the Arts. Wanting to create a superhero short film for his sophomore year, he incorporated superpowers into the girls and used them instead of a Mexican wrestler character he had previously created, named El Fuego. McCracken missed classes and assignments while working on four separate short films of his Whoopass Stew! series, starring the three characters as the "Whoopass Girls". The concept was a superhero parody inspired by the television series Batman (1966). However, only one short film, "A Sticky Situation", was completed. Along with McCracken's other short films, "A Sticky Situation" was shown at Spike and Mike's Sick and Twisted Festival of Animation in 1994. One of his animation instructors, Becky Bristow, was impressed and convinced McCracken to pitch the idea to her friend Linda Simensky, who was serving as the director of development for Nickelodeon at the time. Simensky liked the idea; however, she thought that superhero and action cartoons were not what Nickelodeon executives were looking for.

As McCracken began his third year at CalArts, his friend Paul Rudish hired him to become the art director for 2 Stupid Dogs at Hanna-Barbera, which became McCracken's first job in the animation industry. While working on 2 Stupid Dogs in 1993, he was notified that former Hanna-Barbera president Fred Seibert was looking for shows and pitched Whoopass Stew! as a production board for Hanna-Barbera. As Cartoon Network executives did not allow McCracken to market the series with the word "ass", two of his friends came up separately with the name "Powerpuff", thus the title was changed from The Whoopass Girls to The Powerpuff Girls. In addition, the "can of Whoopass", which originally gave the girls their superpowers, was replaced with Chemical X. Seibert was impressed and began negotiations for a series pickup. Contract negotiations stopped when the series was required to be part of the World Premiere Toons shorts program before turning into a regular animated series. The storyboards, models, backgrounds, layouts, timing, and sheets for the shorts were mostly finished in Hanna-Barbera, and the animation was provided from overseas.

The first animated versions of the Powerpuff Girls, who were originally known as the Whoopass Girls.

The Powerpuff Girls' debut short "Meat Fuzzy Lumpkins" premiered during the Space Ghost Coast to Coast episode "1st World Premiere Toon-In" on February 20, 1995, as part of the World Premiere Toons program on Cartoon Network. The second and final Powerpuff Girls short "Crime 101" aired on World Premiere Toons in January 1996. Cartoon Network tested the shorts in various locations, receiving mixed responses from children. During a focus testing in Los Angeles with the producers and Seibert, a group of 11-year-old boys reacted that young girls should not be superheroes and that the creator "should be fired." Trying to understand their dislike of the short, McCracken attempted to redesign the Powerpuff Girls to appear more realistic. However, Cartoon Network executive Mike Lazzo convinced him to stay true to his original vision.

McCracken was recruited by his former CalArts classmate and roommate Genndy Tartakovsky to serve as an art director, chief character designer, and storyboard artist on Dexter's Laboratory. While working on that show, McCracken attempted to pitch The Powerpuff Girls to other entities, but they showed no interest. Simensky, who joined to serve as senior vice president of Cartoon Network Studios, enjoyed McCracken's work as a storyboard artist on Dexter's Laboratory, persuading Lazzo to let McCracken pitch The Powerpuff Girls again. This time, McCracken turned the Powerpuff Girls into well-defined characters by developing their personalities and expanding the series' concept. On December 1, 1997, Cartoon Network announced that they had greenlit The Powerpuff Girls for an animated series. As post-production of the second season of Dexter's Laboratory was concluding, many of its crew members joined to work on The Powerpuff Girls. McCracken looked over every aspect of the production, consisting of 35 crew members and costing $500,000 per each 30-minute episode.

The Powerpuff Girls in the 2014 special.

The Powerpuff Girls debuted on November 18, 1998, and concluded on March 25, 2005, with a total of six seasons. Cartoon Network aired a half-hour special titled "The Powerpuff Girls Rule!!!" in the United States on January 19, 2009, as part of the series' tenth anniversary marathon. Unlike the original series, the special was animated with Adobe Flash. McCracken and his crew preserved the traditional animation style by studying the first season and testing with the software. On January 28, 2013, a CGI special titled Powerpuff Girls: Dance Pantsed was announced to premiere that year, though it was later delayed to January 20, 2014.

=== Character conception ===
When McCracken was rehired to work on the concept of The Powerpuff Girls, he realized that he was focusing on concepts more than on characters in the World Premiere Toons shorts. To fix that mistake, he came up with distinctive personalities and a backstory for the main characters, which is presented in the main title sequence for each episode.

Cartoon Network executives also advised McCracken to change the names of the Powerpuff Girls to Pink, Blue, and Green, since they found it hard to differentiate them by Blossom, Bubbles, and Buttercup. With Simensky's encouragement, he assembled a bible for the series by writing twenty questions and answering them from the characters' perspective, denoting their individual personalities. McCracken balanced each of the girls' "cuteness and toughness", with Blossom placed "in the middle", Bubbles placed in the "cuteness" side, and Buttercup placed in the "toughness" side.

McCracken conceived Mojo Jojo as a "a green-faced evil monkey being beaten up by three little kindergarten-age girls", an image that he found interesting, later developing him as a "generic science fictiony, evil mastermind." He gave the character a redundant way of speaking, which was inspired by reading DC Comics' The Superdictionary as a child. Mojo Jojo's rhythms of dialogue were also inspired by the English-language adaptation of Speed Racer. McCracken conceptualized Sara Bellum as "the typical hot assistant, though her best feature [is] her brain." "Him" was designed as "a total homage" to the Blue Meanie from Yellow Submarine (1968). According to McCracken, the production staff developed Him "as scary as possible."

=== Writing and storyboarding ===
During story sessions, the crew played with many ideas and motivated episodes based on typical childhood experiences, without doing any deep research on such topic. On top of that, they added the idea of how the Powerpuff Girls would face any childhood dilemma through a superhero's perspective. A three-to-four-page outline was written based on the story sessions. After they were finished, McCracken wrote detailed notes for storyboard artists, consisting of how he wanted the sequences to be storyboarded.

For six weeks, storyboard artists drew and pitched storyboards to the crew before being revised with redrawn sequences. Once they were sent to McCracken, he monitored every sequence and redrew them if the storyboard artists misinterpreted the notes he gave them.

=== Designs and animation ===
The Powerpuff Girls incorporates a flat, simplistic design reminiscent of the UPA shorts and early Hanna-Barbera cartoons. McCracken designed the characters as unrealistic, "iconic" images. The Powerpuff Girls were drawn with big eyes, horizontally shaped oval heads, finger-less hands, and feet that resembles "socks filled with wet sand". Additionally, noses and fingers were not drawn to retain its symbolism of children. McCracken humorously based their character designs on Margaret Keane's paintings of children depicted with "big, sad eyes" from the 1960s.

As his first drawing of the Powerpuff Girls was small, McCracken did not draw certain body parts of the girls. He later tried to draw their fingers, but felt that they did not look right. As McCracken drew more small drawings of them, he increased the sizes of their heads, eyes, bodies, and hands. McCracken preferred the Powerpuff Girls to appear more symbolic of children rather than going for a "realistic" look, meaning fewer body parts were needed. Partially inspired by the Church of the SubGenius figurehead J.R. "Bob" Dobbs whose spray painted images McCracken used to view were stenciled around his town, Professor Utonium was designed with straight lines and black-and-white colors. The Mayor of Townsville was designed with a top hat floating a few inches above his head to represent an image of a mayor.

All of the episodes were hand-drawn and produced at Rough Draft Studios' subdivision Rough Draft Korea. The timing was influenced by Tex Avery and Bob Clampett's shorts; its action sequences were inspired by anime. During production of the fourth season and The Powerpuff Girls Movie, the animation was switched from its traditional cel method to the digital ink and paint technique. Initially, McCracken wanted to continue the traditional cel method, feeling that computer animation still lacked the "visceral feeling" of traditional cel animation.

=== Voice actors ===
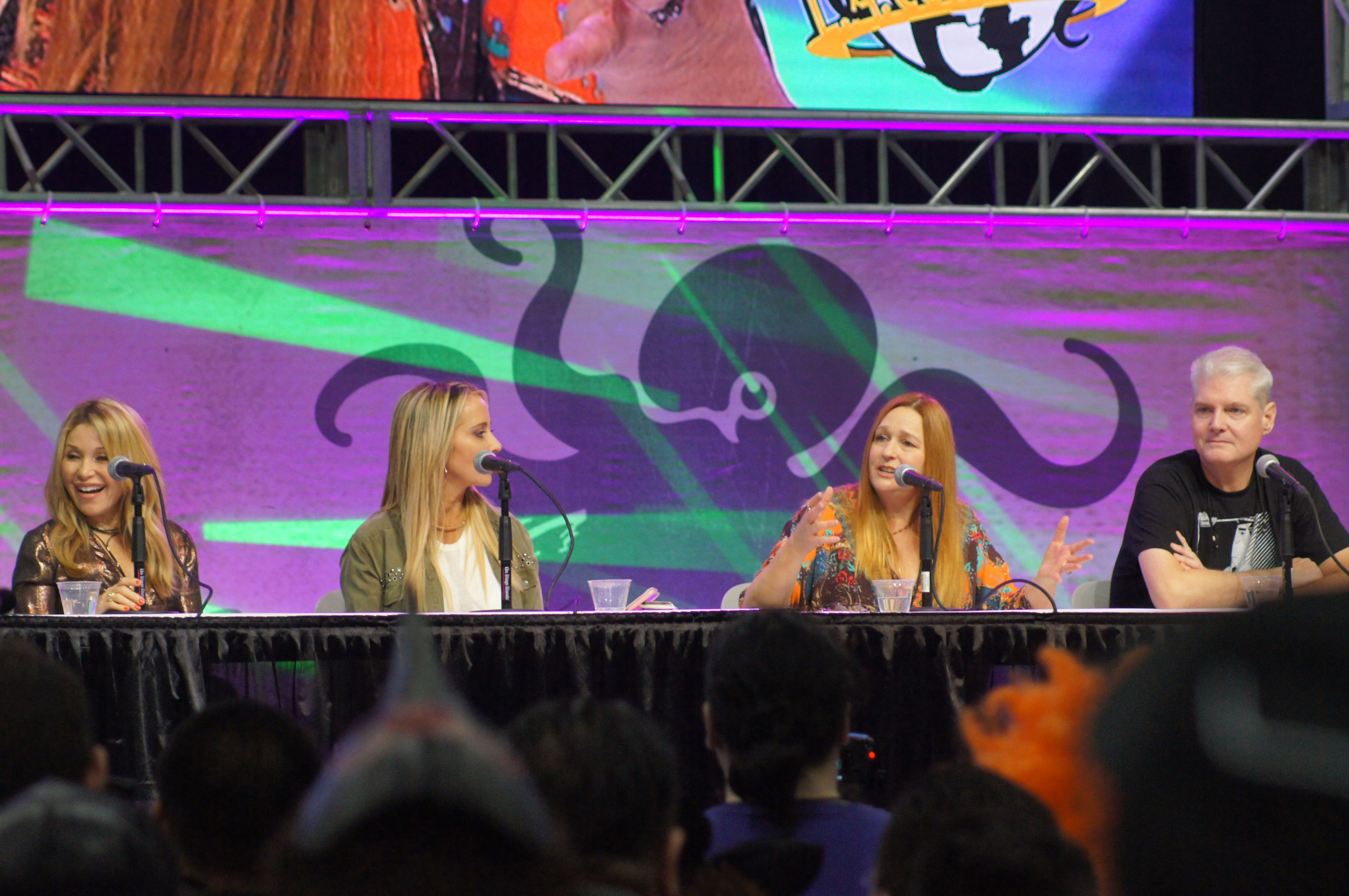
E. G. Daily, Tara Strong, Cathy Cavadini, and Tom Kane at the L.A. Comic Con in 2017.

For Blossom, McCracken wanted "a kind of sincerity and strength and cuteness, and a real uniqueness to her voice." McCracken chose Cathy Cavadini as he considered her "perfect" for the character. Bubbles was the hardest character for McCracken to cast, citing that several voice actors do "cute-girl voices" but can become "really saccharine" and aggravating for viewers. After Tara Strong was cast, she developed Bubbles' angry reactions and screams while retaining the "cuteness" of her voice. McCracken cast E. G. Daily as Buttercup, stating that her voice "has that gruffness, but there's still a cuteness to it." The Mayor of Townsville and the Narrator were voiced by Tom Kenny.

=== Music ===
McCracken wanted the music score to combine the orchestra with electronica and techno music to define its characters, energy, and speed. According to one of the series' composers James L. Venable, the electronica themes were incorporated into the action scenes while the orchestra varied its size in dramatic scenes. Mark Mothersbaugh auditioned to become the composer of the series by composing a demo and sending it to McCracken. McCracken rejected Mothersbaugh as he feared that Mothersbaugh could quit to score for feature-length films and cause production delays.

The opening theme used a sped-up drum break sample of "Funky Drummer" performed by Clyde Stubblefield. The ending theme song was composed and performed by Scottish band Bis.

== Reception ==
When The Powerpuff Girls premiered on Cartoon Network, it became the highest-rated premiere of a Cartoon Network animated series at the time. During its run, the series consistently scored the highest rating for an original series each week for the network across a wide range of demographics—from young children to adults. As the series was intended for young children, McCracken felt surprised by its success and wide appeal.

In August 1999, The Powerpuff Girls received a 6.9 Nielsen rating in the 6-to-11 age group and totaled 987,000 children in the age group, becoming Cartoon Network's highest rating in the age group at the time. By October 1999, the series had an average audience of 1.5 to 1.8 million children. In 2000, it was Cartoon Network's highest-rated original series. It was viewed by over one million viewers during the third season, including "two-thirds" of children and "one-third" of adults, and viewers aged 12 to 17 increased by nearly 120 percent. Additionally, The Powerpuff Girls website gained four million views per month. On September 8, 2000, an episode of The Powerpuff Girls became Cartoon Network's highest-rated program at the time, garnering a 3.4 Nielsen rating and totaling 2.2 million households.

=== Critical reception ===
In a 2000 Entertainment Weekly review, Marc Bernardin complimented the show on its "spot-on pop-culture acumen" and "unparalleled sense of fun", giving it a warm welcome from earlier "lame" superhero cartoons that he grew up with. Peter Marks of The New York Times noted the show's use of adult humor and pop culture references, declaring it "the sort of playful satire that can appeal as much to a viewer of 37 as 7." Joly Herman of Common Sense Media described the show as a "cute, highly stylized series [that] thrills the senses with its strange characters, funny situations, and lots of lowbrow humor". She went on to say, however, that the show does go from innocent to violent in no time and that there is not much protecting young viewers against the violent undertones. Robert Lloyd of the LA Times praised the series, calling it "perfectly drawn, perfectly written and perfectly voiced."

The show began airing at the height of the "Girl power" trend in entertainment media. The Powerpuff Girls were often compared to the likes of Sailor Moon, Lara Croft, and Buffy the Vampire Slayer, who are also strong and heroic female leads. Terrence Briggs of Animation World Network noted that "The Powerpuff Girls works as an interesting comic deviation from the more sexual presences" of other fictional heroines. McCracken argued that he did not create the show to fill a gap in the market encompassed by the "Girl Power" slogan, but that its true vehicle was "good, strong characters" that made for good storytelling. However, he did believe that it gained momentum from being considered a "girl power" cartoon, and that it became successful among boys and girls for the inclusion of action scenes.

In an issue of the online newsletter The Big Blue Dot Trend Update published in 1999, The Powerpuff Girls was voted as the best animated series on television by teenagers, surpassing The Simpsons and Pokémon. In 2002, TV Guide ranked the Powerpuff Girls at number thirteen in the "50 Greatest Cartoon Characters of All Time" list. IGN ranked the series 18th in its "Top 25 Primetime Animated Series of All Time" list in 2006. The Powerpuff Girls peaked at the top spot in Entertainment Weekly's list of "10 Best Cartoon Network Shows" in 2012.

=== Awards and nominations ===
| Year | Award | Category | Recipient(s) | Result |
|---|---|---|---|---|
| 1999 | Annie Awards | Outstanding Individual Achievement for Production Design in an Animated Television Production | Craig Kellman (for "Uh Oh Dynamo") | Nominated |
| 1999 | Annie Awards | Outstanding Individual Achievement for Directing in an Animated Television Production | John McIntyre (for "Mommie Fearest") | Nominated |
| 1999 | Annie Awards | Outstanding Individual Achievement for Voice Acting in an Animated Television Production | Tara Strong (as Bubbles) | Nominated |
| 1999 | Primetime Emmy Awards | Outstanding Animated Program (For Programming One Hour or Less) | Craig McCracken, John McIntyre, Amy Keating Rogers, Jason Butler Rote, and Genndy Tartakovsky (for "Bubblevicious/The Bare Facts") | Nominated |
| 2000 | Annie Awards | Outstanding Individual Achievement for Writing in an Animated Television Production | Chris Savino (for "Dream Scheme") | Nominated |
| 2000 | Primetime Emmy Awards | Outstanding Individual Achievement in Animation | Don Shank (for "Twisted Sister/Cover Up") | Won |
| 2000 | Primetime Emmy Awards | Outstanding Animated Program (For Programming One Hour or Less) | Robert Alvarez, Craig McCracken, John McIntyre, Randy Myers, Amy Keating Rogers, and Genndy Tartakovsky (for "Beat Your Greens/Down 'N Dirty") | Nominated |
| 2001 | Annie Awards | Outstanding Individual Achievement for Music Score an Animated Television Production | James L. Venable, Thomas Chase, and Steve Rucker (for "Meet the Beat Alls") | Won |
| 2001 | Annie Awards | Outstanding Individual Achievement for Production Design in an Animated Television Production | Don Shank | Won |
| 2001 | Primetime Emmy Awards | Outstanding Animated Program (For Programming Less Than One Hour) | Robert Alvarez, Lauren Faust, Craig McCracken, John McIntyre, Amy Rogers, and Genndy Tartakovsky (for "Moral Decay/Meet the Beat Alls") | Nominated |
| 2001 | Kids' Choice Awards | Favorite Cartoon | The Powerpuff Girls | Nominated |
| 2002 | Annie Awards | Outstanding Character Design in an Animated Television Production | Paul Rudish (for "Members Only") | Nominated |
| 2003 | Annie Awards | Outstanding Character Design in an Animated Television Production | Andy Bialk (for "Save Mojo") | Nominated |
| 2004 | Annie Awards | Character Design in an Animated Television Production | Chris Reccardi (for "West in Pieces") | Nominated |
| 2004 | Primetime Emmy Awards | Outstanding Animated Program (For Programming One Hour or More) | Robert Alvarez, Lauren Faust, Juli Hashiguchi, Craig Lewis, Craig McCracken, John McIntyre, Brian A. Miller, Randy Myers, Amy Keating Rogers, Chris Savino, James Tim Walker (for "'Twas the Fight Before Christmas") | Nominated |
| 2005 | Primetime Emmy Awards | Outstanding Individual Achievement in Animation | Frank Gardner (for "West in Pieces") | Won |
| 2014 | Primetime Emmy Awards | Outstanding Individual Achievement in Animation | Cartoon Network Studios (for "Dance Pantsed") | Won |
| 2015 | Annie Awards | Outstanding Achievement, Writing in an Animated TV/Broadcast Production | Dave Tennant, David P. Smith, Chris Mitchell, and Will Mata (for "Dance Pantsed") | Nominated |
| 2015 | Annie Awards | Outstanding Achievement, Production Design in an Animated TV/Broadcast Production | Kevin Dart, Chris Turnham, Jasmin Lai, and Elle Michalka (for "Dance Pantsed") | Nominated |

== Franchise ==
=== Film ===
Due to its popularity, Cartoon Network prompted a film based on the series, which was completed for less than two years. Titled The Powerpuff Girls Movie, it was released in the United States on July 3, 2002, by Warner Bros. Pictures. A prequel to the series, the film follows the story of how the Powerpuff Girls were created, and how Mojo Jojo became a supervillain. The film received a rating of 63% at review aggregator Rotten Tomatoes, as well as some criticism for its violence. The movie grossed $16 million worldwide with an $11 million budget.

=== Anime adaptation ===
A Japanese anime series based on the series Demashita! Powerpuff Girls Z premiered in Japan in 2006 and aired with 52 half-hour episodes. It was locally created to broadcast on TV Tokyo, exploiting the popularity of the original animated series on Japanese satellite television. Powerpuff Girls Z deviates from the original series in terms of genre and animation style. McCracken told NPR's Talk of the Nation that he had little involvement in this version, being there only during the initial development.

=== Cancelled live-action adaptation ===
On August 24, 2020, a live-action television series based on the original animated series was announced to be in development at The CW. According to Variety, it would depict Blossom, Bubbles and Buttercup as "disillusioned twentysomethings" resentful at losing their childhood to fighting crime and faced with the choice of reuniting "when the world needs them more than ever." The project, produced by Warner Bros. Television Studios, was written by Heather Regnier and Diablo Cody, who were serving as executive producers with Greg Berlanti, Sarah Schechter, and David Madden.

A pilot was ordered on February 9, 2021, and Maggie Kiley was hired as the director. On March 9, Variety reported that Chloe Bennet, Dove Cameron and Yana Perrault were cast as Blossom, Bubbles, and Buttercup. On March 30, following the title change to Powerpuff, Donald Faison was cast as Professor "Drake" Utonium. On April 1, Nicholas Podany was cast as Joseph "Jojo" Mondel Jr., the son of Mojo Jojo. On April 7, the series began production. Two days later, it was reported that Robyn Lively was cast as Sara Bellum. Tom Kenny was also confirmed to be reprising his role as the Narrator from the original series. On May 24, The CW announced that the pilot would be reworked off-cycle, with the cast and crew remaining on board. A day later, Mark Pedowitz, president of The CW, stated that the script would be largely rewritten due to negative reviews. On August 11, Bennet dropped out of the project due to scheduling conflicts.

In May 2022, it was said to be in "some stage" of redevelopment. However, on May 18, 2023, The CW announced that the series had been cancelled by Nexstar Media Group. On July 5, it was reported that the series was no longer in development at Warner Bros. Television. On March 6, 2025, a full-length trailer of the series' pilot was leaked by Lost Media Busters on YouTube. It was later removed by Warner Bros. Entertainment that same day.

=== Music ===
The first album Heroes & Villains was conceived by McCracken, choosing bands who influence him and the series. Released in July 2000, it features original songs about the Powerpuff Girls characters by various artists, including the new wave group Devo, Bis, The Apples in Stereo and Frank Black. The album topped the Billboard's Kid Albums chart for six weeks. Additionally, it peaked at number 181 on the week of August 12, 2000, and charted for two weeks on Billboard 200. The music video for the Apples in Stereo song "Signal in the Sky (Let's Go)" premiered in November 2000 during the six-hour "Powerpuff Girls Music Marathon" on Cartoon Network.

The second album The City of Soundsville features electronica-style character themes. The third and final album Power Pop was considered a "big disappointment" and was not received as well as the previous albums. The British girl group Sugababes also released "Angels with Dirty Faces" to promote The Powerpuff Girls Movie. The song peaked at number seven on the UK Singles Chart.

=== Video games ===
Several video games were created to promote the series. The Powerpuff Girls: Bad Mojo Jojo, released on November 14, 2000, follows Blossom as she tries to beat Mojo Jojo. The Powerpuff Girls: Paint the Townsville Green, released in December 2000, follows Buttercup as she fights crime. The Powerpuff Girls: Battle HIM follows Bubbles in her fight against HIM and was released in January 2001. The Powerpuff Girls: Chemical X-traction, released in October 2001, follows the girls battling enemies in a variety of settings in order to reclaim Chemical X and track down Mojo Jojo, who fed the material to all the villains in Townsville.

The Powerpuff Girls: Mojo Jojo A-Go-Go centers around the name of the Powerpuff Girls' mission to stop Mojo Jojo and his minions. Released in 2002, The Powerpuff Girls: HIM and Seek follows the girls battling their variety of enemies through Townsville while on a scavenger hunt. PC games were also created for the series, including The Powerpuff Girls: Princess Snorebucks and The Powerpuff Girls: Gamesville.

== Merchandise and tie-ins ==
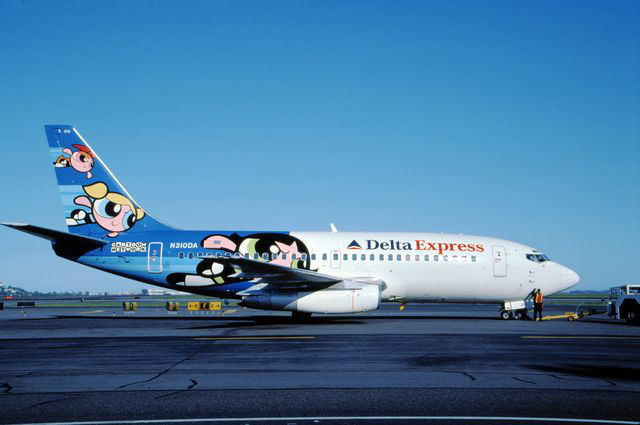
Boeing 737-232 decorated with the Powerpuff Girls

After the premiere of The Powerpuff Girls, Warner Bros. Consumer Products received calls from licensing and retail companies, as well as consumers, looking for merchandise based on the series. As demand for merchandise grew, McCracken and his crew created the initial designs and sculpts of its plush toys. By 2000, more than 60 companies encompassed a variety of products, including T-shirts, toys, video games, lunchboxes, and dishware. In 2001, Warner Bros. Consumer Products deemed The Powerpuff Girls their flagship brand, given the success of the show's merchandise. The International Licensing Industry Merchandisers Association (LIMA) named it License of the Year at their 2001 awards ceremony. The franchise's retail sales earned $350 million by 2000 and nearly $1 billion by 2002. The array of products was so extensive by then that, according to Janan Sheria of the Dayton Daily News, even people without cable television could recognize the Powerpuff Girls.

Beginning in 1999, Trendmasters manufactured Powerpuff Girls dolls, playsets, and action figures, aimed primarily at girls ages 6–11. McCracken and Genndy Tartakovsky were initially involved in the conception of these toys. By 2000, comics published by DC Comics and books published by Little Golden Books were produced, selling nearly 400,000 units in 2001. In February 2000, a Powerpuff-sponsored car raced in the Daytona 500. On July 17, Boeing 737-232 was unveiled at the Cable Television Association of Marketers convention in Boston. From August 21 to October 1, 2000, Subway promoted the series with four toys in their kids' meals.

In December 2006, U.S. Toy Company recalled 48,000 necklaces based on the series for high levels of lead; no injuries and incidents were reported. In 2014, IDW Publishing published a variant cover which showed aged-up versions of Powerpuff Girls with breasts and dressed in latex. The cover was designed by an artist working for Cartoon Network who was "thinking of it more along the lines of 'female empowerment' than the kind of thing you guys are talking about". Cartoon Network said in a statement: "We recognize some fans' reaction to the cover and, as such, will no longer be releasing it at comic book shops."

== See also ==
- Cartoon Cartoons
- List of female action heroes
- List of works produced by Hanna-Barbera Productions
