= John Disco =

British songwriter (born 1978)

John Clark (born on 21 August 1978, better known as John Disco) is a Scottish record producer, sound engineer and songwriter. He started out his career as a member of the band Bis, and has worked in the recording studio with Fangs, Franz Ferdinand, Stevie Jackson, Linus Loves and Mylo.

Clark co-wrote and performed the theme song to the American animated series The Powerpuff Girls.

== Career ==
=== Bands ===
In 1994, Disco, Steven Clark (Sci-fi Steven) and Amanda MacKinnon (Manda Rin) formed the band bis in Glasgow, Scotland. His roles in the group included guitar, vocals, synthesisers, bass guitar and programming. In March 1996, bis released their third EP, The Secret Vampire Soundtrack on the Chemikal Underground label, which charted at number 25 in the UK Single Chart. bis toured extensively from 1996 to 2000, and achieved strong fan bases in Japan, US and Australia. The band split in 2003, but in 2005 formed a new band data Panik which lasted until the next year. bis played several gigs in 2007 and appeared at the 2010 Primavera Sound Festival.

In 2003, Disco joined Glasgow band The Amphetameanies, replacing departing guitarist Alex Kapranos. He produced their 2006 album, Now That's What I Call The Amphetameanies. In 2003, Disco (with Ally Christie) also released the 12” Fukd I.D. #8 - 12k Boost Boost under the name Kempston, Protek & Fuller through Chemikal Underground.

Disco and Steven Clark have made several records as Dirty Hospital on their Rottenrow Records label.

Since 2011, Disco has released solo material under the moniker Debukas with 12”s coming out on labels 20:20 Vision and his own label 2sox. The debut Debukas full-length LP I Am Machinery was released in 2013. A second Debukas full-length release, Left At The Lights, was released in 2020, in a limited-edition of 25 cassettes through label Golden Mind.

=== Production / engineering / remixing ===
Disco has worked with several notable artists in an engineering and co-production capacity. In 2004 he worked on the Mylo album Destroy Rock & Roll, and subsequently went on to collaborate with Mylo label mate Linus Loves. With Linus Loves, he has remixed for Justin Timberlake, Pixie Lott, Britney Spears, Gossip and Ladyhawke. The John Disco 'reversion' of "No You Girls" by Franz Ferdinand appeared on their 2009 single.

Disco has been at the recording controls for Fangs, Franz Ferdinand, Belle & Sebastian's Stevie Jackson, Matchsticks, Yay Us and The Rezillos.
