= Manda Rin =

Scottish singer, artist and songwriter

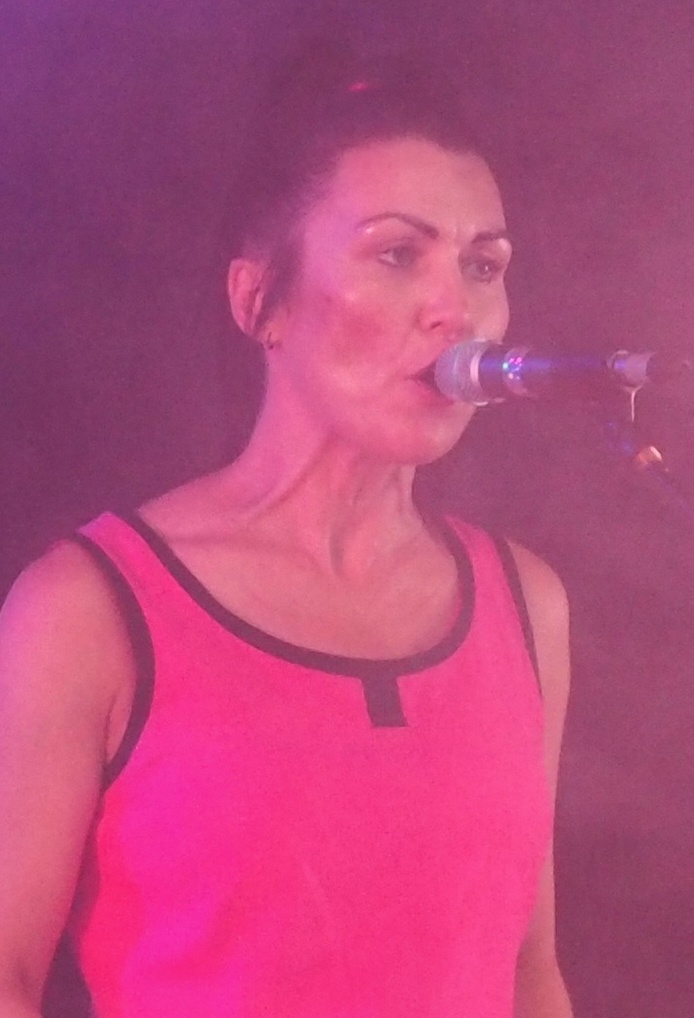
- Manda Rin performing at Indietracks, 2019

Background information
- Also known as: Manda Rin
- Born: Amanda MacKinnon; 22 March 1977 (age 49)
- Origin: Giffnock, Renfrewshire, Scotland
- Occupations: Musician, radio host, artist
- Instruments: Vocals, keyboard
- Years active: 1994-present
- Member of: Bis
- Spouse: Stuart Memo (married 2011–present)

Amanda MacKinnon (born 22 March 1977), better known by her stage name Manda Rin, is a Scottish singer, artist and songwriter. She is the singer, drummer and keyboardist of the Scottish indie rock band Bis, later fronted the Kitchen and also released a solo album. She also co-hosted a radio show on BBC Scotland called Air.

Rin is the only person ever to appear in three of the line up rounds on Never Mind the Buzzcocks: twice on the original run on the BBC, and once on the revival on Sky. Her first appearance initially unaired; one of the contestants on the programme was Russell Brand who, shortly after taping, became embroiled in a tabloid row after leaving messages on the answerphone of Andrew Sachs for his radio programme, resulting in Brand being banned from the BBC.

Rin also co-wrote the theme song to the American animated television series The Powerpuff Girls, which she performed with Bis.

== Music career ==
=== Bis ===
In 1994, Rin, along with the brothers Steven Clark (Sci-fi Steven) and John Clark (John Disco), formed the band Bis in Glasgow, Scotland. In March 1996, Bis performed their single "Kandy Pop" on Top of the Pops twice, which charted at number 25 in the UK Singles Chart. The lead single, "Eurodisco", from their second album, Social Dancing (1999), reached number 37. Bis toured extensively from 1996 to 2000, and achieved strong fan bases in Japan, the US and Australia. The band split in 2003, but in 2005 formed a new band, Data Panik, which lasted until the next year. Bis reformed in 2007 and released a fourth album, Data Panik Etcetera, in 2014. A fifth album, Slight Disconnects, followed in 2019.

=== Solo ===
Rin released a solo single, "Guilty Pleasure", and an EP, My DNA Sampler, in 2008, both on This Is Fake DIY Records. The next year, her EP My DNA was released, and a solo album of the same name followed in 2009.

=== Other work ===
Rin contributed vocals to tracks for the 1998 album Cat Food by J Church and Meister's 2004 album I Met the Music.

Rin also fronted the Kitchen with Ryan Seagrist from Alison Mosshart's first band, Discount, who released several singles from 2001 to 2004 and an album in 2003 on the Damaged Goods label. She later teamed up with Hyperbubble on a track for the group's 2011 album Drastic Cinematic and for the 2013 EP Hyperbubble + Manda Rin.

Following the first dissolution of Bis, Rin became a DJ at nightclubs, most notably Death Disco at the Arches in Glasgow.

== Artwork ==
Rin was responsible for the manga-inspired artwork on all of Bis's releases. Her sleeves aided the success of the band, most notably in Japan; she published a monthly comic strip in the Japanese magazine Buzz. More recently, Rin has held an exhibition of her work under the title "Cover Versions and Other Hits".

== Personal life ==
In 2009, Rin revealed that she had been diagnosed with multiple sclerosis four years earlier.

Rin married Stuart Memo in 2011.
