= Superstitious Stimpy =

- The Ren & Stimpy Show episode
- Episode no.: Season 4 Episode 24
- Directed by: Bob Camp
- Written by: Ron Hauge; Jim Gomez; Bob Camp
- Production code: RS-421
- Original air date: April 1, 1995

Episode chronology
← Previous "Ren Needs Help!"	Next → "Travelogue"

"Superstitious Stimpy" is the twenty-sixth and penultimate episode of the fourth season of The Ren & Stimpy Show. It originally aired on Nickelodeon in the United States on April 1, 1995, serving as the first segment of the 14th half-hour of the season.

== Plot ==
Stimpy hammers a boar's head on the wall, annoying Ren who just wanted to read. Stimpy reveals that it is Tuesday the 17, an unlucky day, as he had foolishly studied astrology and taken up superstitions. Ren tries to convince him that he is being scammed by "the boar' head industry" for his money, but Stimpy stubbornly refuses to listen and maims himself with roses to ward off "bad luck". The boar's beheaded body arrives and confuses Ren with Stimpy for stealing his head, kicking him into the air. Stimpy maims himself again after he sees Ren stuck in the ceiling as bad luck.

Ren sets up a grill for a barbecue indoors, a foolish move with dire consequences misinterpreted by Stimpy as bad luck. Stimpy manages to outdo this by worshipping Ren's barbecue carcass as if it is a deity. Ren chastises him and demands him tor return to the house, struck by lightning when he insults the deity. He paints Stimpy black, burns the meat with the bed and does everything Stimpy considers to be bad luck out of spite. He makes Stimpy say what he believes in is stupid and eats his meat, but Stimpy find his biological features (ignored in all other scenes) even more unlucky; he has a birthmark resembling Argentina, webbed toes and a unicorn horn; Stimpy concludes that he is the "unlucky beast" as documented in a book. Ren admits he was born on a Tuesday the 17th, crying at his extremely bad luck. Stimpy offers to cure his bad luck.

Stimpy gives Ren a mix of toad squeezing, baboon drool and owl pellets to gargle, torturing him, and convinces him to jump with a goat off the roof to combat his fear of heights before being squashed by the carcass, who is apparently sentient. Stimpy forces Ren to wear various absurd machinations offscreen and makes him stand at the spot until the next day when his "bad luck" wears off. He escapes to go to the toilet, but the toilet is hit by lightning; a charred Ren returns to the house to a disappointed Stimpy, hiding in an urn before being struck again. Stimpy concludes there is one last thing to do. He gives Ren a lucky charm, a leper's foot. The leper arrives with the boar earlier to retrieve his foot and beat Ren up for "stealing" his foot, which Stimpy considers to be lucky and ending the episode.

== Cast ==
- Billy West as Ren, Stimpy and living boar's head

== Production ==
Peter Avanzino produced the episode's storyboards, as it was the last episode he had worked on before leaving Games Animation for good. Avanzino would later go on to work on director for episodes of Futurama, which coincidentally features Ren & Stimpy actor Billy West. For unknown reasons, it was designated a part of the series' fourth season, despite part of the original season was rechristened an artificial "fifth season" by Nickelodeon, with the first two episodes, "Ol' Blue Nose" and "Stupid Sidekick Union" having aired two weeks prior.

== Reception ==
American journalist Thad Komorowski gave the episode two out of five stars, calling it an "unfunny and ugly cartoon" ruined by its flat story and overseas animation.

== Books and articles ==
- Dobbs, G. Michael (2015). Escape – How Animation Broke into the Mainstream in the 1990s. Orlando: BearManor Media. ISBN 978-1593931100.
- Komorowski, Thad (2017). Sick Little Monkeys: The Unauthorized Ren & Stimpy Story. Albany, Georgia: BearManor Media. ISBN 978-1629331836.
