= Travelogue (The Ren & Stimpy Show) =

- The Ren & Stimpy Show episode
- Episode no.: Season 4 Episode 25
- Directed by: Arthur Filloy
- Written by: Jim Gomez
- Production code: RS-406
- Original air date: April 1, 1995

Episode chronology
← Previous "Superstitious Stimpy"	Next → "Ol' Blue Nose"

"Travelogue" is the twenty fifth and last episode of the fourth season of The Ren & Stimpy Show. It originally aired on Nickelodeon in the United States on April 1, 1995.

== Plot ==
Ren and Stimpy host a travelogue series that is distinct from "Untamed World". They travel to a fictional continent named Acromeglia, but not before they idiotically get feminine "vacation wigs" and stuff useless items including processed meat and chewing gum into their luggage, which they force a wildebeest to carry for them and get on a small airplane to the continent. The only other passenger on the plane is a terrorist and dynamite disguised as a woman.

Ren passes out from disgust after watching Stimpy consume a sandwich with rotten meat. Hours later, they wake up to find "the townsfolk waving at them"; Acromeglia is in fact a war-torn anarchist country, with the townsfolk and army maliciously shooting down the plane. Ren and Stimpy do not realize the aggression. The king tricks them into being knocked out by his hulking bodyguard.

Ren and Stimpy are dipped into scalding water in what they consider to be a welcoming ceremony; they drink all the water, much to the horror of the king and his bodyguards who had intended to boil them alive; they revere the duo alongside the people with a newfound respect for surviving the death trap and allows them to take a bath. As per custom, they are "scrubbed" with a pocketknife. They enjoy a local meal, which involve chicken head bread and monkey brains soup, which is so disgusting not even Stimpy is debauched enough to enjoy it. Ren forces him to eat it, which he spits out immediately and cheered by the locals. Ren finds it palatable, which offends the locals; he manages to make them cheer when he is more disgusted about the hair in his soup than the soup itself.

The duo take a taxi driven by an obese Elvis Presley, where they explain that the continent outsources "New Americans", the most unintelligent of Americans who are sent to North America to waste time and people's sanity. Presley brings them to see an "Ol' Faceful", an attraction which is essentially a rotting and senile old man resembling Wilbur Cobb. He is known for his exact timing of vomiting, which he does so again at noon; everyone escapes except for an oblivious Ren, who is hit by the blast. Next, they visit "Disgraceland", a monument guarded by the country's sacred animal, a baboon. People come here to have their faces ripped and thrown by the baboon, with Ren "lucky" enough to have his face hanging on a cactus. Ren takes a photo with the baboon while his skull is exposed.

The day is a "revolution day", when the people overthrow their king every year and replace them with an even more incompetent individual. The duo witness the "revolution" as they are beheaded alongside the king and stabbed onto pikes, waving goodbye with their trachea and ending the episode.

== Cast ==
- Billy West as Ren and Stimpy
- Bob Camp as Elvis Presley and the baboon

== Production ==
The episode was directed by Arthur Filloy, an alumnus of Mr. Big Cartoons. After directing the animation for "Blazing Entrails", he left the company due to low pay but was convinced by an angry Jim Ballantine (whom he did not notify about the departure) to be hired at Games Animation, with a higher wage at the condition that he directs all contracted episodes at Mr. Big Cartoons, including the upcoming season five episode "Terminal Stimpy". For unknown reasons, it was designated a part of the series' fourth season, despite part of the original season was rechristened an artificial "fifth season" by Nickelodeon, with the first two episodes, "Ol' Blue Nose" and "Stupid Sidekick Union" having aired two weeks prior.

== Reception ==
American journalist Thad Komorowski gave the episode zero out of five stars, calling it an "awful barrage of poorly executed gross-out gags".

== Books and articles ==
- Dobbs, G. Michael (2015). Escape – How Animation Broke into the Mainstream in the 1990s. Orlando: BearManor Media. ISBN 978-1593931100.
- Komorowski, Thad (2017). Sick Little Monkeys: The Unauthorized Ren & Stimpy Story. Albany, Georgia: BearManor Media. ISBN 978-1629331836.
