= An Abe Divided =

- The Ren & Stimpy Show episode
- Episode no.: Season 3 Episode 6
- Directed by: Jim Gomez
- Written by: Jim Gomez; Ron Hauge
- Production code: RS-310
- Original air date: December 18, 1993

Guest appearance
- Jack Carter as Sergeant Bigbutt

Episode chronology
← Previous "Ren's Pecs"	Next → "Stimpy's Cartoon Show"

"An Abe Divided" is the fifth episode of the third season of The Ren & Stimpy Show. It originally aired on Nickelodeon in the United States on December 18, 1993.

== Plot ==
Ren and Stimpy are starving and homeless once again in Washington, D.C. Ren eats a maggot-infested porkchop, so a sad Stimpy licks the newspaper the porkchop is in. He accidentally licks an advertisement recruiting security guards to safeguard the Lincoln Memorial. Ren is ecstatic at this discovery.

They apply for the job, where a transvestite sergeant named Sergeant Bigbutt threatens to whip them with towels (demonstrated after Stimpy misconstrues its meaning) and hires them. They are instructed to clean Abraham Lincoln's statue. Having no knowledge of Lincoln, Stimpy foolishly confuses him with Santa Claus, and begins writing a wish list. Ren forces him to abandon his unintentional disrespect of the memorial, but Stimpy again misconstrues the message as Santa Claus being dead.

The next day, Ren and Stimpy guard the memorial while a crowd visit; Ren overhears an old man telling his grandson about a purported treasure in the statue's head. He fantasizes about gaining immense riches and living a luxurious lifestyle from the treasure before forcibly closing down the exhibit.

Ren brainstorms about how to go inside Lincoln's statue, before settling with going inside his nose. He is stuck, so Stimpy saves him by paying a nickel for an ironically disrespectful feature of making Lincoln pick his nose. Ren is painfully extracted with this method; it is revealed that other security guards had died by the same way, consumed by greed and attempting to enter Lincoln's nose for the treasure, dying in a spot where Lincoln hides his "mucus".

Ren and Stimpy saw the statue's head off; Stimpy recalls his knowledge that there is in fact caramel corn inside the statue's head, which enrages Ren, who demands to see to believe him and thus saws quicker. Stimpy is delighted to find his knowledge to be correct; there indeed is caramel corn. While he devours the caramel corn, Ren is amused by this occurrence, only to realize the crime they had committed, He orders Stimpy to repair the statue as soon as possible.

Stimpy rebuilds the statue's head to resemble Santa Claus and a hillbilly, which Ren finds unacceptable. They make a convincing recreation of Lincoln's face with sausages, which a band of brutalist pigeons instantly devour, inadvertently saving a squirrel of being tormented by the pigeons. The duo use increasingly absurd alternatives including a penny with Lincoln's face, the heads of an elk, a tiki, and the Statue of Liberty. They eventually settle with a dumpster, which they draw a crude caricature of Lincoln's face on and set on fire. They are horrified to find out that an obese individual lives in the dumpster, who appreciates the "redecoration" and carries it away. Ren begs Lincoln's ghost for help, who immediately appears to kick them mercilessly out of disapproval.

The duo are discovered by Sergeant Bigbutt the next morning, who threatens to kill them, but instead forces the two to stand in as Lincoln's head in the exhibit permanently, where they starve to death.

== Cast ==
- Ren – voice of Billy West
- Stimpy – voice of Billy West
- Sergeant Bigbutt – voice of Jack Carter
- Street bum – voice of Billy West
- Pigeon – voice of Billy West

== Production ==
"An Abe Divided" was the second episode directed by Jim Gomez and the second without involvement from Spümcø. Unlike "Circus Midgets", Gomez was far more enthusiastic in "An Abe Divided". The story for "An Abe Divided" was a homage to the Laurel and Hardy films. The layout for "An Abe Divided" was done by Michael Kim, assisted by Donald Shank, Tom McGrath and Steve Loter. Many of the cartoonists at Games Animation who worked on "An Abe Divided" were novices and the production suffered because of their inexperience. Kim stated: "It was actually a bigger struggle to rectify that. We had a crew of layout artists that were really green; they'd just be pouring in, and our schedules would be really tight because of that. The thing you learn is that it is a business and there's no infinite budget. So when you have a lot of these artists that are soaking in the budget, your schedule gets tight". Jim Ballantine stated that "An Abe Divided" was "a schedule disaster" due to the inexperience of many of the artists, and that "An Abe Divided" took 12 weeks to complete the layout stage in the summer of 1993. "An Abe Divided" was animated in six weeks by Rough Draft Korea in Seoul in what was by all accounts a rushed production. Despite the episode being well received, Gomez refused to direct more episodes in the series and gladly returned to writing, having experienced what John Kricfalusi had to endure but in a more chaotic environment.

== Reception ==
American journalist Thad Komorowski gave "An Abe Divided" four stars out of five, calling it a well-made and humorous episode in spite of its rushed production and a fan-favorite.

== Books and articles ==
- Dobbs, G. Michael (2015). Escape – How Animation Broke into the Mainstream in the 1990s. Orlando: BearManor Media. ISBN 978-1593931100.
- Komorowski, Thad (2017). Sick Little Monkeys: The Unauthorized Ren & Stimpy Story. Albany, Georgia: BearManor Media. ISBN 978-1629331836.
