= Feud for Sale =

- The Ren & Stimpy Show episode
- Episode no.: Season 5 Episode 4
- Directed by: Ron Hughart
- Written by: Jim Gomez; Bob Camp; Vince Calandra; Ron Hauge
- Original air date: June 3, 1995

Episode chronology
← Previous "Space Dogged"	Next → "Hair of the Cat"

"Feud for Sale" is the fourth episode of the fifth season of The Ren & Stimpy Show. It originally aired on Nickelodeon in the United States on June 3, 1995.

== Plot ==
The Announcer Salesman quickly leaves a town after swindling a village's inhabitants and angering them, barely stopping himself from falling off a cliff after his tire blows out. He notices a "feud zone", where two neighboring men, Ewalt and Abner are in the middle of a bitter feud. Pitying the duo's stupidity, he decides to "help the two out of their misery" – essentially swindling the duo's money in the process.

The Salesman visits Abner, who is barely able to memorize his own name; he notes that Ewalt is a bitter enemy. He trades a pointy stick with the stick Abner is hammering, demanding money from him as "monetary compensation"; amazed by the concept of trade, Abner immediately gathers $1 million from his grandfather (who stays at his house and has a fortune) to pay for as many sticks as he wants.

The Salesman visits Ewalt, making him jealous at Abner who idiotically wears the sticks. He sells Ewalt flypaper, who is amazed when he hears it is from France (worn by the stupidest of people there). He again solicits funds from his equally ancient grandfather to buy the flypaper. He uses the same trick again, with Abner buying mousetraps after envying Ewalt wearing flypaper, Ewalt buying a beehive girdle, the duo buying respectively an elephant tosser (with elephant included) and elephant catcher glove. After the elephant flattens Abner, the Salesman begrudgingly pays the elephant a commission after it threatens the Salesman out of dignity.

Abner finally realizes something is wrong with what little perception he has, believing the Salesman's ruses are a hoax, only to be threatened into submission by the Salesman's aggressive insults. The Salesman convinces him to be a kamikaze bomber holding a nuclear weapon to be dropped from a plane he pilots. After the bombing, which destroys the duo's houses, the duo agree to reconcile as they have nothing to lose left. The Salesman feels great as he had brought peace in a moral act, while driving away with his acquired wealth and Abner's grandfather, ending the episode.

== Cast ==
- Announcer Salesman ("There's That Man Again" in the episode) – Voice of Billy West
- Ewalt Nitwit – Voice of Bob Camp
- Abner Dimwit – Voice of Bob Camp

== Production ==
Chris Reccardi produced the episode's storyboards. This is the third episode where Ren and Stimpy are not seen or mentioned in any form, and the first of which that was not alternatively a pilot episode for a pitched spin-off series. It was produced as part of the fourth season but aired during a Nickelodeon-"commissioned" fifth season.

== Reception ==
American journalist Thad Komorowski gave the episode four out of five stars, noting that Bob Camp's strong writing is exemplified by the plot's "sheer insanity", making it one of the funniest episodes in the series without the series' titular duo.

== Books and articles ==
- Dobbs, G. Michael (2015). Escape – How Animation Broke into the Mainstream in the 1990s. Orlando: BearManor Media. ISBN 978-1593931100.
- Komorowski, Thad (2017). Sick Little Monkeys: The Unauthorized Ren & Stimpy Story. Albany, Georgia: BearManor Media. ISBN 978-1629331836.
