= Circus Midgets =

- The Ren & Stimpy Show episode
- Episode no.: Season 3 Episode 3
- Directed by: Bob Camp; Jim Gomez
- Story by: Bob Camp; Peter Avanzino; Ron Hauge
- Production code: RS-306
- Original air date: November 26, 1993

Episode chronology
← Previous "A Yard Too Far"	Next → "No Pants Today"

"Circus Midgets" is the third episode of the third season of The Ren & Stimpy Show. It originally aired on Nickelodeon in the United States on November 26, 1993. It is the first episode in the series with no involvement from Spümcø, being pitched and produced at Games Animation after the studio's firing.

== Plot ==
Ren and Stimpy are hitchhiking across a desert highway, looking for rides but get ignored by cars. They do eventually be picked up, being abducted by a small car and leaving their luggage behind.

Two clowns, Schlomo and Momo, are in the car laughing menacingly. They threaten Stimpy when he follows up laughing, before introducing themselves; they play various practical jokes in the duo before playing a laugh track at the end of their torture. They dress the duo as clowns and force them to enact various circus tricks that are hypothetically impossible due to the car's limited space, which includes trapeze and diving into a pool.

The clowns stop at a gas station, where they commit theft; Ren and Stimpy try to escape, only to find the driver to be a third clown; the clowns hit Ren, who asks to leave, with bags of money, car tires and Kowalski before leaving; they also abduct a cow and a singing blue whale in the process.

The clowns make fools of the people they had kidnapped, only to be tailed by policemen; Momo steals parts from the police car to stop it, only to have their tires deflate. The car goes off a cliff, during which everyone leaves in a bid of freedom - except for Ren and Stimpy who become stuck in the car as it ultimately crashes into a large rock. Ren and Stimpy hitchhike once again, only to be picked up by the Fire Chief; as the duo's clown costumes resemble "circus midgets", they are beat up (offscreen) by the Fire Chief while he drives.

== Cast ==
- Billy West as Ren, Stimpy, and Police officer #2
- Charlie Callas as Shlomo
- Harris Peet as Momo, Police officer #1, and Fire chief

== Production ==
The script for "Circus Midgets" was written by Peter Avanzino and was heavy with references to the 1990 Martin Scorsese film Goodfellas, which Avanzino was a huge fan of. Jim Gomez was assigned to direct "Circus Midgets", a story that he had no interest in directing as he felt that the script was too violent and unnecessarily full of references to the film. Gomez was told to direct "Circus Midgets" if he wanted to be a director on the series. Gomez said: "I absolutely did not want to do it. I hated all the referential shit. Ballantine said, 'Well, there's not going to be any more opportunities for you directing if you don't do this one first'. Their whole thinking was that this script had already been approved. I just wanted to throw it out, but there was a bunch of bullshit attached to the delivery requirements at the time that we weren't privy to, and that seemed to be the driving force for a lot of it". Gomez was clearly unenthusiastic about the story that he directed, which impacted the finished product; he would put substantially more effort on "An Abe Divided", after which he gave up directing for the series.

Charlie Callas, best known for his comedy work with Mel Brooks, Jerry Lewis, and Dean Martin, as well as the voice of Elliott the Dragon in Disney's 1977 live-action/animated film Pete's Dragon, guest starred in this episode as the voice of Shlomo, in an effort for the series to use guest appearances. Showrunner Bob Camp wanted more celebrity guest stars in the series, of which original creator John Kricfalusi had refused, fearing the series would become a sellout. As this is the first episode without the involvement of Kricfalusi nor his Spümcø team, Camp used such guest stars in multiple attempts to reinvigorate discussion on the series.

Due to his lack of involvement and dislike of the episode, Kricfalusi himself did not commentate the episode in its DVD release, replacing it with humorous commentary by Ren (voiced by Kricfalusi) and Stimpy (voiced by Eric Bauza) where they try to remember what actually happened in the episode. This was used as an easter egg for the initial DVD release.

== Reception ==
American journalist Thad Komorowski gave "Circus Midgets" two star out of five, calling it a meandering and mean episode leading up to a single ineffective joke. Komorowski stated that basic problem with "Circus Midgets" was Ren and Stimpy were "merely punching bags for a domineering third party" with Ren and Stimpy merely reacting instead of acting as was the case with the two cartoons from 1992 with George Liquor as an antagonist. The show's executive producer, Vanessa Coffey, admitted that the episode was a failure, saying: "It probably crossed some violent lines that we won't want to do again. We probably won't be using those circus midget characters in future episodes either".

== Books and articles ==
- Dobbs, G. Michael (2015). Escape – How Animation Broke into the Mainstream in the 1990s. Orlando: BearManor Media. ISBN 978-1593931100.
- Komorowski, Thad (2017). Sick Little Monkeys: The Unauthorized Ren & Stimpy Story. Albany, Georgia: BearManor Media. ISBN 978-1629331836.
