= To Salve and Salve Not! =

- The Ren & Stimpy Show episode
- Episode no.: Season 3 Episode 1
- Directed by: Bob Camp
- Written by: Bob Camp; Vincent Waller
- Production code: RS-301
- Original air date: November 20, 1993

Episode chronology
← Previous "The Royal Canadian Kilted Yaksmen"	Next → "A Yard Too Far"

"To Salve and Salve Not!" is the first episode of the third season of The Ren & Stimpy Show. It originally aired on Nickelodeon in the United States on November 20, 1993.

It is the first episode in the series to be entirely produced at Games Animation. Intended to be part of the second season, no preliminary work had been done at Spümcø when series creator John Kricfalusi was fired, so it was instead produced during the third season; it is also the final episode of the series to have involvement from Vincent Waller.

== Plot ==
Stimpy watches The Muddy Mudskipper Show while Ren reads a newspaper. An advertisement compels Stimpy to call and buy a Rube Goldberg machine designed to suck a monkey into it for 12,000 monthly installments of $7,000. Ren has his skin sucked into the machine, followed by his intestines; he tries to save his brain but his entire body is sucked inside; he emerges barely alive and infuriated.

Stimpy bites the sofa while Ren sleeps, only to find The Salesman at the door. He attempts to sell Stimpy an all-purpose ointment named Salve. He promotes the ointment in an aggressive manner, which makes Stimpy doubt long enough for Ren to intervene and kick the Salesman out.

Stimpy finds a room where Ren demands him not to enter, only to find cosmetics. He applies face powder to his face and buttocks for his amusement. He tries to comb his unruly hair, but it just will not budge to his annoyance; he gives up when the Salesman appears from the face powder container. He finally convinces Stimpy to buy Salve by using it to comb his hair and give him a stylish wig made of the ointment. Ren appears and tells Stimpy to leave, noting that he is too young to understand makeup, only to apply face powder and bumping the Salesman's buttocks on his head. Shocked and appalled, he kicks the Salesman out of the window.

Ren orders Stimpy to wash the dishes, only to run out of soap; the Salesman emerges from the tap and demonstrates Salve's utility in dishwashing. An enraged Ren pushes him into the sink and flushes him away. The next day, Ren and Stimpy make breakfast, only for the Salesman to disguise as a piece of toast and make Stimpy eat Salve with it instead of jam. This proves to be the last straw for Ren and he tries to assault him, but could not risk slipping (he had stepped onto butter), so he tortures the Salesman by scraping the "toast" with a knife and feeding it to a stray dog.

Ren goes to the toilet while reading a romance novel, but the toilet paper had run out. The Salesman emerges from the toilet yet again to promote Salve as a replacement for toilet paper; Ren tries to react in anger but could only accept the Salesman's offer in desperation. It is revealed that Stimpy had bought all the Salve, who offers a can to Ren. Ren takes a lick of ointment out of humiliation, ending the episode.

== Cast ==
- Billy West as Ren, Stimpy and The Salesman

== Production ==
Bob Camp and Vincent Waller wrote the script for "To Salve and Salve Not!" in late 1991 as part of the second season. The script had been approved by the network, but when Spümcø lost the contract for The Ren & Stimpy Show on September 21, 1992, the episode was assigned to the new Games Animation studio. Production on the second season was so erratic and late that "To Salve and Salve Not!" was held over for the third season. During the Spümcø era, there were two loosely defined types of plots. John Kricfalusi's specialty is his "psychodramas" where one of the characters, in particular Ren, would be put through an emotionally wrenching experience. Bob Camp's specialty is his "gag reels", which were a collection of gags built loosely around a thin plot. In January 1993, the network forbade any more "psychodramas", as they reminded the executives of John while also being the most problematic episodes to censor; Bob Camp would later attempt "psychodramas" of his own style for such episodes as "Ren's Bitter Half", "Hermit Ren" and "Ren Needs Help!". Therefore, this episode marked the beginning of what is referred to as the "Games era", which was felt to be a decline in quality compared to the "Spümcø era".

== Reception ==
American journalist Thad Komorowski gave the episode four stars out of five; he praised Bob Camp's directorial work, whose "conscious sense of self-restraint" kept the more grotesque elements of the plot at bay.

== Books and articles ==
- Dobbs, G. Michael (2015). Escape – How Animation Broke into the Mainstream in the 1990s. Orlando: BearManor Media. ISBN 978-1593931100.
- Komorowski, Thad (2017). Sick Little Monkeys: The Unauthorized Ren & Stimpy Story. Albany, Georgia: BearManor Media. ISBN 978-1629331836.
