= A Yard Too Far =

- The Ren & Stimpy Show episode
- Episode no.: Season 3 Episode 2
- Directed by: Bob Camp
- Story by: Bob Camp; John Kricfalusi (uncredited)
- Production code: RS-305
- Original air date: November 20, 1993

Episode chronology
← Previous "To Salve and Salve Not!"	Next → "Circus Midgets"

"A Yard Too Far" is the second episode of the third season of The Ren & Stimpy Show. It originally aired on Nickelodeon in the United States on November 20, 1993.

== Plot ==
Ren and Stimpy are starving and homeless when they come upon an attractive smell; it brings the duo to the Pipe residence, where they find Ren's favorite food, hog jowls. Ren believes it to be a trap, where a dog would shred them into pieces; it turns out to be a baboon that does so.

Once the baboon falls asleep, Ren removes Stimpy's remotely operated skin and enters the house. Mr. Pipe immediately finds him, mistakes him for hog jowls, and throws him to the baboon, causing Stimpy to feel the pain.

Ren and Stimpy disguise as Mrs. Pipe, which Ren cleverly evades being detected by patting the baboon's head; Mr. Pipe appears and forces his "wife" to take care of the baboon, which involves the duo walking into the baboon's mouth for its pleasure; they leave in a tattered disguise.

Ren acquires an attractive and lifelike, if not realistic, puppet of a female baboon to seduce the baboon, which he claims to never fail. Stimpy tries to steal the jowls while the baboon is distracted; he falls in love with the puppet, spraying perfume which goes on Ren's eye, as well as offering maggots which Ren accidentally eats; he swallows them to prevent failure of the scheme. He offers to marry the puppet, inadvertently pulling Ren into the residence. Not realizing Stimpy's deception, he dresses Stimpy up as a marriage officiant, who conducts their "marriage".

The baboon, not realizing the deception, locks Ren's hand alongside him and the puppet in his residence. While Ren is annoyed by this, Stimpy brings the hog jowls to him to eat together as lunch, as the baboon is too occupied to notice while Mr. Pipe is negligent as ever; the duo enjoy their hot jowls while Ren expresses his gratitude, ending the episode.

== Cast ==
- Billy West as Ren, Stimpy, and Mr. Pipe
- Bob Camp as Baboon

== Production ==
The script for "A Yard Too Far" was written by John Kricfalusi and was intended for the second season. Kricfalusi had planned to direct the episode as an exercise in educating his employees at the Spümcø studio about story structure. Kricfalusi based his story on "Pie-Pirates", a Yogi Bear segment in The Huckleberry Hound Show – a series produced by Hanna-Barbera, where Kricfalusi had begun his career. When Spümcø lost the contract for The Ren & Stimpy Show and Kricfalusi was fired on September 21, 1992, "A Yard Too Far" was reassigned by the network to the Games Animation studio. The delivery of episodes for the second season was so haphazard and late that "A Yard Too Far" was held over for the third season. "A Yard Too Far" was directed by Bob Camp, who served as showrunner and filled in for Kricfalusi. After Kricfalusi complained about being uncredited for his work, his writing credit was restored on further airings on the episode.

== Reception ==
American journalist Thad Komorowski gave "A Yard Too Far" four stars out of five; he noted that Camp's directorial work showed self-restraint that allowed the episode to be funny without being overly gross.

== Books and articles ==
- Dobbs, G. Michael (2015). Escape – How Animation Broke into the Mainstream in the 1990s. Orlando: BearManor Media. ISBN 978-1593931100.
- Komorowski, Thad (2017). Sick Little Monkeys: The Unauthorized Ren & Stimpy Story. Albany, Georgia: BearManor Media. ISBN 978-1629331836.
