= City Hicks =

- The Ren & Stimpy Show episode
- Episode no.: Season 5 Episode 6
- Directed by: Ken Bruce
- Written by: Vince Calandra
- Original air date: July 1, 1995

Episode chronology
← Previous "Hair of the Cat"	Next → "Stimpy's Pet"

City Hicks is the sixth episode of the fifth season of The Ren & Stimpy Show. It originally aired on Nickelodeon in the United States on July 1, 1995. Much like its sister episode that aired along with, "Hair of the Cat", this episode was widely considered one of the worst in the Games-era episodes, as well as the entire series. However, its background color received its praise.

== Plot ==
Ren and Stimpy are intellectually disabled farmers who enjoy the famine and infestation by desert locusts and harvest dust. For dinner, Ren is served "dirtkey" (an actually edible turkey) and "hot dust puppies" (slabs of dust). They pray to God for a bountiful harvest which they had stolen from the indians.

The duo sleep when it rains; Ren is horrified that it'll "damage their crops". He is horrified that seedlings have grown in their soil and making them fertile, despite this being what they had hoped for, as they are too stupid to fathom the concept of plants being edible. Plants grow on Ren's hat as he cries; Ren insults God for giving him a harvest of plants, who strikes him with lightning for his immense stupidity. The duo leave their farm the next day on their sheep, disgusted by the sight of "stupid and useless" fruits and vegetables.

The duo walk into a city, where they steal feminine clothing, only to find their sheep either been shorn or towed away. They are beat up by thugs who stole their feminine clothing to cross-dress. They realize the road is made of grime, which they harvest until they are threatened by animals who reveal the city to be a "union town"; the duo have to work from the bottom of its hierarchy to become "grime collectors". They start from having buildings built on their bodies, a factory job where they play cockroaches being exterminated to fishing and processing immigrants at New York City; their job was taken over by an immigrant they approved. The duo bemoan city life and attempt suicide by lying in the road, hoping to be run over. Dust suddenly falls from the sky; Dusty Claus, Stimpy's idol, appears to them. He offers to take them to the "dust mines", which they agree; the trio exit the city through the sewers, ending the episode.

== Cast ==
- Billy West as Ren and Stimpy

== Production ==
"City Hicks" was produced for the series' fourth season and aired during a Nickelodeon-"commissioned" fifth season. It was storyboarded at Character Builders in Ohio, a less costly alternative to most animation studios such as Rough Draft Studios by Jim Kammerud alongside Arthur Filloy, formerly of Mr. Big Cartoons, to save costs. The low quality of its storytelling was made worse by the fact director Ken Bruce was assigned the responsibility to direct the episode after it had been animated at Toon-Us-In, which was the main criticism of the episode itself.

== Reception ==
American journalist Thad Komorowski gave the episode zero out of five stars, calling it one of the worst in the series with its only saving grace being Richard Daskas' color styling.

== Books and articles ==
- Dobbs, G. Michael (2015). Escape – How Animation Broke into the Mainstream in the 1990s. Orlando: BearManor Media. ISBN 978-1593931100.
- Komorowski, Thad (2017). Sick Little Monkeys: The Unauthorized Ren & Stimpy Story. Albany, Georgia: BearManor Media. ISBN 978-1629331836.
