= Space Dogged =

- The Ren & Stimpy Show episode
- Episode no.: Season 5 Episode 3
- Directed by: Steve Loter
- Written by: Jim Gomez; Bob Camp
- Production code: RS-429
- Original air date: June 3, 1995

Guest appearance
- Phil Hartman as Pig

Episode chronology
← Previous "Stupid Sidekick Union"	Next → "Feud for Sale"

"Space Dogged" is the third episode of the fifth season of The Ren & Stimpy Show. It originally aired on Nickelodeon in the United States on June 3, 1995.

== Plot ==
Ren and Stimpy are homeless and wandering in the Soviet Union in 1954; they are unwittingly abducted and placed in the Soviet space program. In a state-produced propaganda film produced to capture this significant moment, they endure many tests from their superior Kowalski, including their ability to withstand comically exaggerated harm and 167 days of isolation where Ren pretends to eat Stimpy to cope with hunger.

The film ends as the duo prepare to get on their spacecraft. A pair of mice get on a rocket which instantly incinerates save for the frame and the mice. A panicking Russian man switches his number card with Stimpy to delay his inevitable doom, but Kowalski does not fall for it; the rocket he is on explodes. It is the duo's turn, with Stimpy defecating in his suit; the tube is connected to Ren, who narrowly avoids being covered with feces by having Kowalski grab them in time. They blast off alongside an American rocket which are operated by pigs; despite the implication that their rocket has exploded yet again, the rocket successfully blasts off.

Kowalski accidentally destroys the radar connecting the rocket and the government, causing the duo's rocket to plunge; they manage to get into space by burning potatoes and their furniture. Ren devises a plan to steal fuel from the Americans; Stimpy accidentally plugs the wire into the septic tank, causing one of the pigs, who was defecating, to be sucked into the Russian spacecraft. Out of hatred, the pig incinerates himself to death by jumping into the fuel tank, which gives the spacecraft more power than necessary. The American spacecraft controlled by another pig catches up, but is incinerated to oblivion when Ren and Stimpy burn their feces-filled underwear and socks, with the gas offering way more power than the pig. The duo land near the White House, with a general guarding the House covering for them with American flags to avoid controversy. The duo are heralded as the winners of the space race as part of the United States, eating all the corn they can while being cheered on; the American pig is "celebrated" in Russia on a platter, ending the episode.

== Cast ==
- Billy West as Ren, Stimpy, and Kowalski
- Phil Hartman as Pig
- Harris Peet as General

== Production ==
This is the first episode to feature Phil Hartman in a cameo role, in multiple attempts by showrunner Bob Camp to reinvigorate discussion of the series with guest stars; he would appear again in "Stimpy's Pet". Tom McGrath, who went on to work for DreamWorks Animation, produced the storyboard for the episode, and Steve Loter had directed the episode. It was produced as part of the fourth season and aired during a Nickelodeon-"commissioned" fifth season.

== Reception ==
American journalist Thad Komorowski gave the episode three and a half out of five stars.

== Books and articles ==
- Dobbs, G. Michael (2015). Escape – How Animation Broke into the Mainstream in the 1990s. Orlando: BearManor Media. ISBN 978-1593931100.
- Komorowski, Thad (2017). Sick Little Monkeys: The Unauthorized Ren & Stimpy Story. Albany, Georgia: BearManor Media. ISBN 978-1629331836.
