= No Pants Today =

- The Ren & Stimpy Show episode
- Episode no.: Season 3 Episode 4
- Directed by: Bob Camp; Bill Wray
- Written by: Richard Pursel
- Production code: RS-302
- Original air date: November 26, 1993

Episode chronology
← Previous "Circus Midgets"	Next → "Ren's Pecs"

"No Pants Today" is the fourth episode of the third season of The Ren & Stimpy Show. It originally aired on Nickelodeon in the United States on November 26, 1993. It is Bill Wray's first episode as director, having served as a painter for the series from the beginning.

== Plot ==
One morning, Stimpy takes a shower while Ren is sleeping. Afterwards, he suddenly realizes he is naked, asking for his pants despite never owning a pair. Ren chastises him for his stupidity and forces him to go outside.

Stimpy tries to borrow underwear from the Pipe residence, where he nonsensically horrifies a hapless Mrs. Pipe with his nudity. Mr. Pipe chases him away with a hose. He hides in a tree, only for the "neighborhood sadist" Victor to appear cutting down trees with a chainsaw. Claiming to be a "professional bully", he forces Stimpy to be punched in the stomach in exchange for his underwear.

After the bout, Victor brings Stimpy to his father's car, where they verbally abuse him while still tending to their promise; Victor's father gives Stimpy his oversized underwear, ties it with rope as a belt and launches him out of the car as a cruel joke. Laughing at their apparent humiliation of Stimpy, they get distracted and drive off a cliff, killing them both as the car explodes.

Stimpy wakes up and is held ransom by a bull which nonsensically has swollen udders and needs them to keep his udders in control with underpants. Stimpy obliges, to which the bull attempts to thank by running into him and send him on his way, but accidentally sends him to a dark forest. At the forest, various clothed animals mock him for his nudity, only to leave when their leader, a giant bear, gives Stimpy a squirrel to wear, as urban wildlife are most likely to be naked.

Stimpy returns home, where Ren criticizes him for attempting to wear pants, but offers gowns instead; Ren is revealed to be an experienced transvestite, having also convinced Stimpy and the squirrel to dress as females for their humiliation.

== Cast ==
- Billy West as Ren, Stimpy, Mr. Pipe, and Victor's dad
- Cheryl Chase as Mrs. Pipe
- Bob Camp as the bear
- Danny Cooksey as Victor
- Michael Pataki as the cow

== Production ==
The story was written at Spümcø by Richard Pursel in 1992, who intended it for the second season under the title "Stimpy, That Dirty Little Naked Boy". When Spümcø lost the contract for The Ren & Stimpy Show, the story was assigned to the Games Animation studio. As Games Animation struggled to finish off the second season, the story for "No Pants Today" was held off for the third season. Pursel insisted that the original story that he envisioned was not as violent as the final version, which he blamed on Bill Wray's overactive imagination and love of graphic violence. Pursel recalled: "I just remember a lot of Bill's suggestions in writing meetings were, 'and then we break his neck! And then they can get him killed!' But he laughed after he said it". The story was censored by Nickelodeon, who removed the scenes of Stimpy being dragged down a road by a car and Stimpy being tortured with a butter knife as too extreme.

== Reception ==
American journalist Thad Komorowski gave the episode three out of five stars; he noted that Bob Camp and Bill Wray's direction of the episode emphasizes Stimpy's torture rather than his humiliation or stupidity, what makes it incapable of fully achieving its potential.

== Books and articles ==
- Dobbs, G. Michael (2015). Escape – How Animation Broke into the Mainstream in the 1990s. Orlando: BearManor Media. ISBN 978-1593931100.
- Komorowski, Thad (2017). Sick Little Monkeys: The Unauthorized Ren & Stimpy Story. Albany, Georgia: BearManor Media. ISBN 978-1629331836.
