= Hair of the Cat =

- The Ren & Stimpy Show episode
- Episode no.: Season 5 Episode 5
- Directed by: Ken Bruce
- Written by: Ron Hauge
- Original air date: July 1, 1995

Episode chronology
← Previous "Feud for Sale"	Next → "City Hicks"

"Hair of the Cat" is the fifth episode of the fifth season of The Ren & Stimpy Show. It originally aired on Nickelodeon in the United States on July 1, 1995.

== Plot ==
Ren and Stimpy are sitting on the couch watching television; but only Ren is feeling unwell as he is constantly sneezing while Stimpy's fur is everywhere. Stimpy fetches Ren tissues, with his fur on his hands making Ren's condition worse. Ren reacts in horror when he discovers hives on his chest; he goes to take a shower but accidentally uses Stimpy's fur-laden towel, causing hives to grow everywhere.

Ren tries to find out how sick he is with a book, with his sinuses torturing his brain; he refuses food from Stimpy, choosing to eat shredded cardboard to avoid more incidents while Stimpy indulges on multiple fatty foods. Ren's tongue swells to a gigantic size after he drinks water with Stimpy's fur. He goes out with Stimpy on a wheelchair and gas mask, where he waits for Stimpy while he frolicks in nature. He is stung by a mosquito after removing the gas mask, causing his body to swell again.

Ren sterilizes everything in the house to avoid more incidents; Stimpy is flattened by everything Ren throws after he sterilizes them. He makes the bed, causing more fur to fall on the bed. Ren awakes the next day with excessive rheum, believing himself to be blind as he could not open his eyes. Stimpy chisels the rheum, causing Ren massive pain; he only realizes his allergy to Stimpy's fur is the cause of his troubles after drinking a cup of hot water for breakfast and still feeling unwell. He pursues Stimpy angrily, only to get so allergic his sneeze destroys the house.

Ren stuffs Stimpy into a pickle jar, with his hand out to grab items for Ren. Ren makes a sandwich, with the last item being a pickled cucumber from the jar due to his negligence; Ren presumably suffers an allergic reaction offscreen, ending the episode.

== Cast ==
- Billy West as Ren, Stimpy, and the mosquito

== Production ==
Mark Marren produced the storyboards; due to his work frequently being revised by senior crew members like Bob Camp, he opted to be credited under the pseudonym Kirk Field. Director Ken Bruce was given the responsibility to direct the episode after it had been animated at Toon-Us-In, contributing to its low quality, which became one of the many criticisms of the Games-era episodes. The episode was initially produced as part of the series' fourth season, airing instead as part of a Nickelodeon-"commissioned" fifth season.

== Reception ==
American journalist Thad Komorowski gave the episode zero out of five stars, calling it "predictable and unfunny".

== Books and articles ==
- Dobbs, G. Michael (2015). Escape – How Animation Broke into the Mainstream in the 1990s. Orlando: BearManor Media. ISBN 978-1593931100.
- Komorowski, Thad (2017). Sick Little Monkeys: The Unauthorized Ren & Stimpy Story. Albany, Georgia: BearManor Media. ISBN 978-1629331836.
