= Stimpy's Pet =

- The Ren & Stimpy Show episode
- Episode no.: Season 5 Episode 7
- Directed by: Steve Loter
- Written by: Vince Calandra; Jim Gomez; Bob Camp
- Production code: RS-434
- Original air date: October 7, 1995

Guest appearance
- Phil Hartman as Sid

Episode chronology
← Previous "City Hicks"	Next → "Ren's Brain"

"Stimpy's Pet" is the seventh episode of the fifth season of The Ren & Stimpy Show. It originally aired on Nickelodeon in the United States on October 7, 1995.

== Plot ==
Ren and Stimpy relax in the living room. Ren reads a newspaper while Stimpy watches television, when Stimpy answers a door to find an abandoned infantile circus clown. It is revealed that Stimpy had done the same before, which gave Ren a rash from purging the clown. Ren reluctantly lets him keep as long as he does all the work in caring for the clown. Stimpy name him Sid, who acts lovingly towards stupid Stimpy while condescending towards Ren.

Sid manages to spend the entire day without causing trouble, only for Ren to get him to leave his bed; his attempts to charm Ren fail. He leaves after insulting Ren, with Stimpy foolishly seeing this as an attempt to show his sadness to Ren's lack of hospitality. Stimpy lets him in again in the middle of the night, only to be smashed into the wall by Ren. Sid takes a shower the next day, stuffing the pipes with his waste; Ren tries to retaliate but cannot due to Sid spraying water on him. Sid bites Ren's buttocks while he lectures Stimpy on consequences, with Stimpy mistaking it for teething; he is also foolishly impressed by Sid's ability to use the toilet and telephone.

Ren returns home to find the house devastated by Sid's antics, with Stimpy joyfully playing with him while the Fire Chief is kidnapped for inevitably trying to kill Sid, a "circus midget". Ren is attacked by Sid for his aggression, puts him in a room of his own, before easily capturing him with a bag as Sid believes it to be a beating instead. Sid is painfully purged by being sent into the sewers by Ren, assuming the pipes to be too small for him. The next day, Stimpy worries for Sid's absence, which Ren attributes him to running away. Stimpy professes his love to Sid, noting it to be slightly less than his devotion to Ren.

Nine weeks later, Sid manages to escape the sewers. Stimpy has set up an altar for him, praying for his return. Sid returns to the duo's house for retribution on Ren, but does not attack him as the sheer sight of him and his infant children might overwhelm him. Ren shows considerably less aggression to the infants, which both Stimpy and Sid approve of, but is attacked anyway, ending the episode.

== Cast ==
- Billy West as Ren and Stimpy
- Phil Hartman as Sid the Clown

== Production ==
"Stimpy's Pet" was produced during the fourth season of the series and aired during a Nickelodeon-"commissioned" fifth season. Phil Hartman voices the titular pet in his second and last guest star on the series, in multiple attempts by showrunner Bob Camp to reinvigorate discussion on the series, following his appearance in "Space Dogged"; it is his last cameo on a Nickelodeon series before his murder in 1998. Director Steve Loter noted that production on the episode was extremely rushed, with little time put into quality assurance, as more focus was put on Chris Reccardi's "Ren's Brain" while directors like him have little to no influence on episodes' structure; he considered the episode to be lackluster. It aired on October 7, 1995, with that episode, after a three-month absence of new episodes.

== Reception ==
American journalist Thad Komorowski gave the episode two and a half out of five stars, noting the tired writing to be a point of criticism. He also criticized its noticeable rush in production as another major flaw of the episode.

== Books and articles ==
- Dobbs, G. Michael (2015). Escape – How Animation Broke into the Mainstream in the 1990s. Orlando: BearManor Media. ISBN 978-1593931100.
- Komorowski, Thad (2017). Sick Little Monkeys: The Unauthorized Ren & Stimpy Story. Albany, Georgia: BearManor Media. ISBN 978-1629331836.
