= Ren's Pecs =

- The Ren & Stimpy Show episode
- Episode no.: Season 3 Episode 5
- Directed by: Ron Hughart
- Story by: Richard Pursel
- Production code: RS-304
- Original air date: December 18, 1993

Guest appearance
- Gary Owens as Charles Globe

Episode chronology
← Previous "No Pants Today"	Next → "An Abe Divided"

"Ren's Pecs" is the fifth episode of the third season of The Ren & Stimpy Show. It originally aired on Nickelodeon in the United States on December 18, 1993.

== Plot ==
Ren and Stimpy are on a beach, where Stimpy reads while Ren tries to impress women to no avail. Ren is insulted by a muscular individual who leaves with the women; Ren is angered and breaks into tears.

Suddenly, the ultra-fit socialite Charles Globe is washed up; he explains that pectoral muscles implants can be achieved by simply injecting fat at the spot; he had achieved his fame by moving fat from his comically plump feet to his upper body. Despite Ren's lack of fat, Stimpy offers to donate his fat from his buttocks, having donated fat before, much to Ren's gratitude.

After a highly unprofessional and painful surgery, Ren joyfully receives his new "pectoral muscles". He immediately returns to the beach where he shows off his implants and beats up the muscular individual with them while Stimpy knits. Ren decides to move on with his new life, but not before bidding Stimpy goodbye, who had knitted him a muscle shirt.

Ren goes to Hollywood where he becomes an actor and model, garnering massive riches and fame. Consumed by his fame and glory, Ren has lost his integrity, claiming Globe to be his greatest influence while forgetting about Stimpy, who returns to him as a servant yet is treated harshly by Ren, who believes him to be familiar. Stimpy is still glad Ren is truly happy.

== Cast ==
- Ren – voice of Billy West
- Charles Globe – voice of Gary Owens
- Stimpy – voice of Billy West
- Bully – voice of Bob Camp
- Beach babe – voice of Cheryl Chase
- Doctor – voice of Billy West
- Doctor's Assistant – voice of Cheryl Chase

== Production ==
The episode was written for the second season by Richard Pursel at Spümcø. After series creator John Kricfalusi was fired on September 21, 1992, the episode was produced at Games Animation which held it over to the third season. The original version called for the episode to be half an hour long and was to feature Ren's fall from being a Hollywood star in comedic fashion and to return to Stimpy at the end similar to "The Big Shot!". Due to Pursel's departure, Games Animation assigned Ron Hughart as director, who reworked the episode, cut the story short and allowed Ren to stay a Hollywood star, making the episode a direct inversion of "The Big Shot!". Peter Avanzino served as the storyboard artist for the episode.

== Reception ==
American journalist Thad Komorowski gave "Ren's Pecs" three-and-a-half stars out of half.

== Books and articles ==
- Dobbs, G. Michael (2015). Escape – How Animation Broke into the Mainstream in the 1990s. Orlando: BearManor Media. ISBN 978-1593931100.
- Komorowski, Thad (2017). Sick Little Monkeys: The Unauthorized Ren & Stimpy Story. Albany, Georgia: BearManor Media. ISBN 978-1629331836.
