= Phil Hartman =

Canadian-American actor (1948–1998)

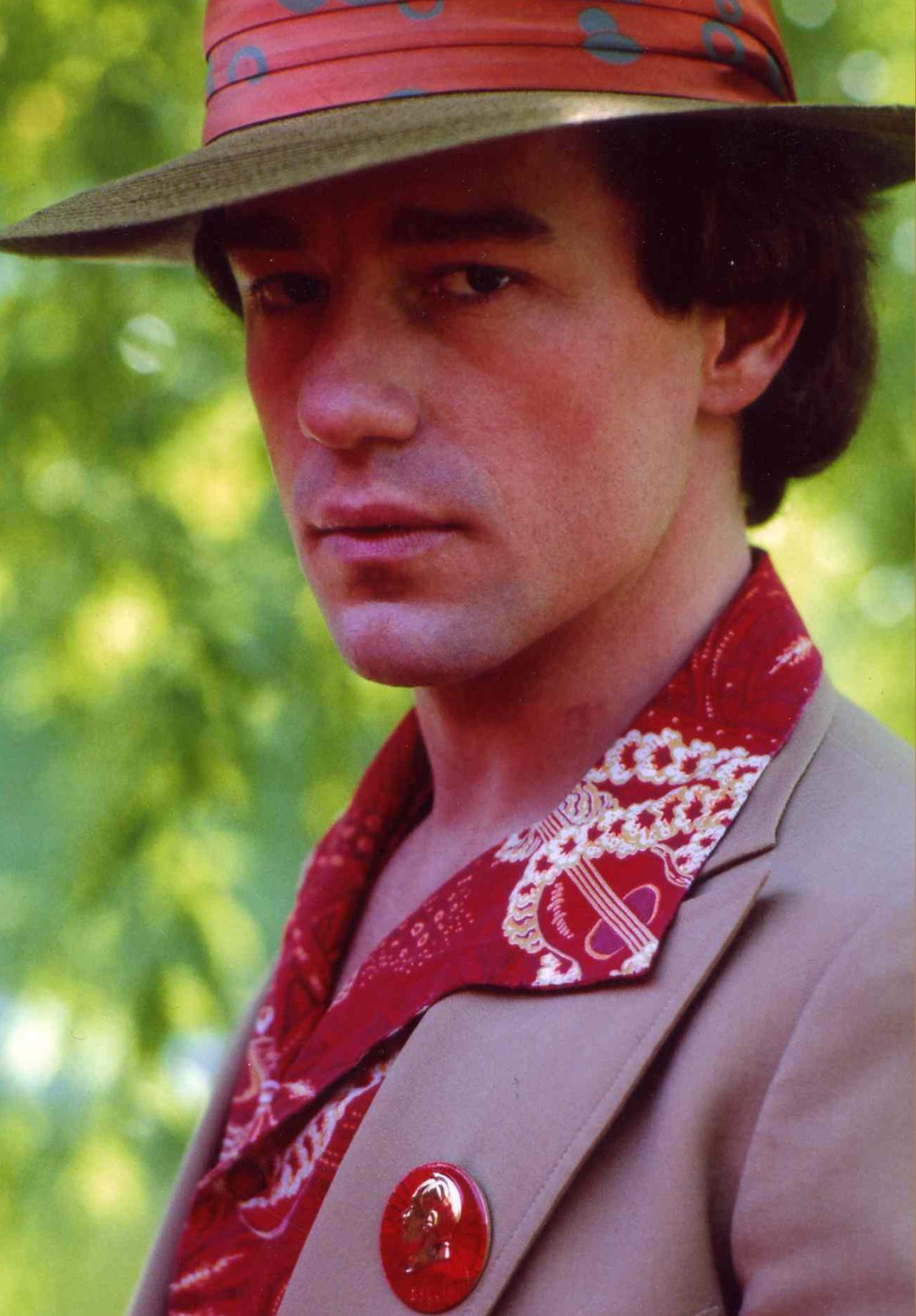
- Hartman in character as Chick Hazard, Private Eye, c. 1978
- Born: Phillip Edward Hartmann; September 24, 1948; Brantford, Ontario, Canada
- Died: May 28, 1998 (aged 49); Los Angeles, California, U.S.
- Citizenship: Canada; United States
- Education: California State University, Northridge (BA)
- Occupations: Actor; comedian; screenwriter; graphic designer
- Years active: 1969–1998
- Television: Saturday Night Live, Pee-wee's Playhouse, NewsRadio
- Spouses: Gretchen Lewis (m. 1970; div. 1972); Lisa Strain (m. 1982; div. 1985); Brynn Omdahl (m. 1987)
- Children: 2

Philip Edward Hartman (né Hartmann; September 24, 1948 – May 28, 1998) was a Canadian and American comedian, actor, screenwriter, and graphic designer. Hartman was born in Brantford, Ontario, and his family moved to the United States when he was ten years old. He completed a BA (graphic arts) at California State University, Northridge, and designed album covers for bands including Poco and America. In 1975, Hartman joined the comedy group the Groundlings, where he helped Paul Reubens develop his character Pee-wee Herman. Hartman co-wrote the film Pee-wee's Big Adventure and made recurring appearances as Captain Carl on Reubens' show Pee-wee's Playhouse.

In 1986, Hartman joined the NBC sketch comedy show Saturday Night Live (SNL) as a cast member and stayed for eight seasons. Nicknamed "Glue" for his ability to hold the show together and help other cast members, he won a Primetime Emmy Award for his SNL work in 1989. After leaving SNL in 1994, Hartman starred as Bill McNeal in the sitcom NewsRadio. He also voiced Lionel Hutz and Troy McClure on The Simpsons, and appeared in the films Houseguest (1995), Sgt. Bilko (1996), Jingle All the Way (1996), and Small Soldiers (1998).

After two divorces, Hartman married Brynn Omdahl in 1987, with whom he had two children. Their marriage was troubled due to his busy work schedule and her substance abuse and domestic violence. In 1998, while Phil was sleeping, Brynn shot and killed him, and later killed herself. He was posthumously inducted into Canada's Walk of Fame in 2012 and the Hollywood Walk of Fame in 2014.

== Early life ==
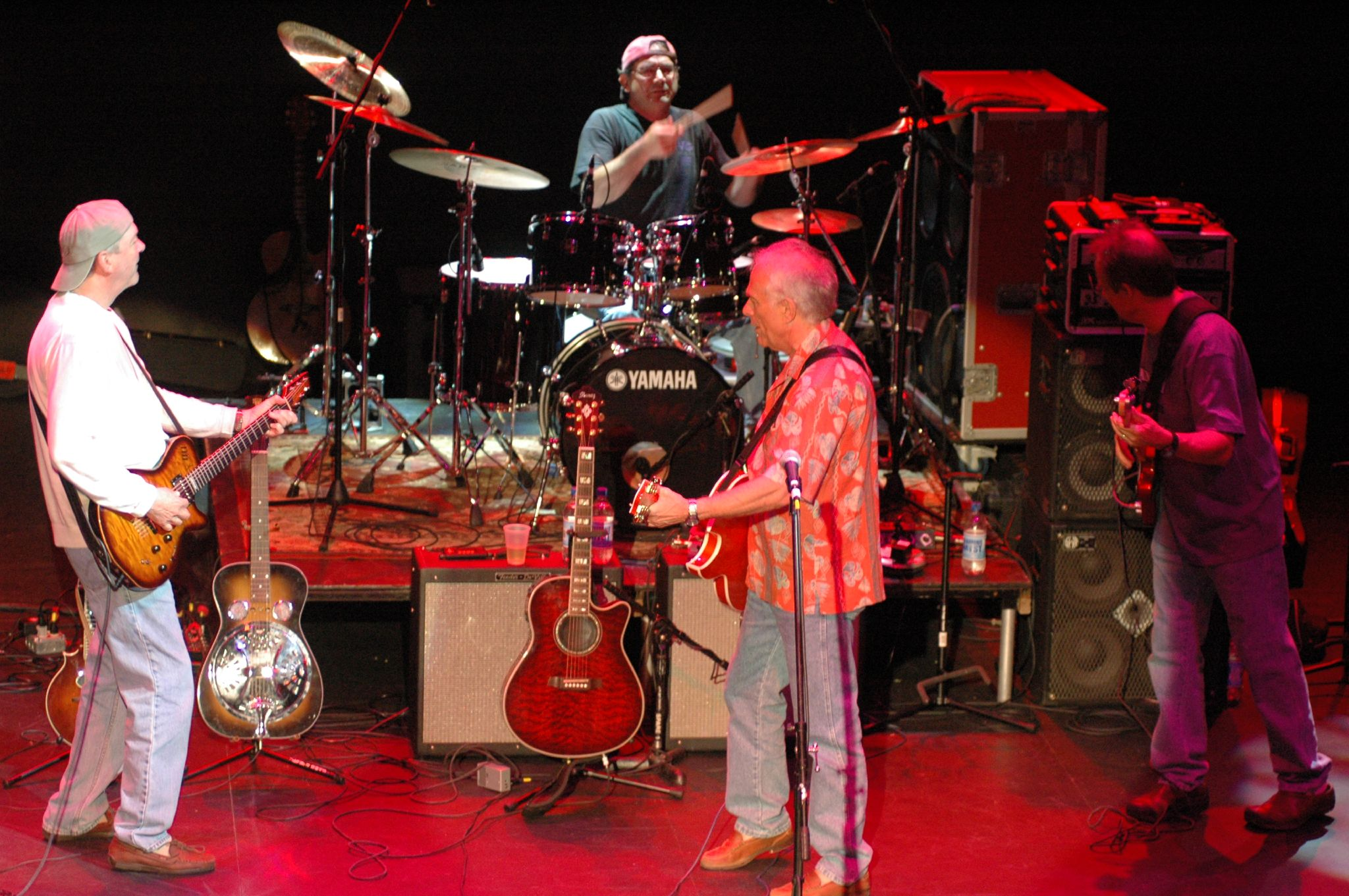
Hartman designed album covers for bands such as Poco

Phil Hartman was born Philip Edward Hartmann on September 24, 1948, in Brantford, Ontario. He was the fourth of eight children of Doris Marguerite (née Wardell) and Rupert Loebig Hartmann, who sold building materials. The family was Catholic. Describing his childhood, Hartman later said: "I suppose I didn't get what I wanted out of my family life, so I started seeking love and attention elsewhere."

Hartman was 10 years old when his family moved to the United States. They first lived in Lewiston, Maine, then Meriden, Connecticut, and then on the West Coast, where he attended Westchester High School in Los Angeles and frequently acted as the class clown. After graduating, he studied art at Santa Monica City College, dropping out in 1969 to become a roadie with a rock band. He returned to school in 1972 to study graphic arts at California State University, Northridge. He developed and operated his own graphic art business, creating more than 40 album covers for bands including Poco and America, as well as advertising and the logo for Crosby, Stills & Nash. In the late 1970s, he made his first television appearance on an episode of The Dating Game, where he won.

== Career ==
=== The Groundlings and Pee-Wee Herman (1975–1985) ===
Working alone as a graphic artist, Hartman frequently amused himself with "flights of voice fantasies." In 1975, seeking a more social outlet for his talents, he began attending evening comedy classes by the California-based improvisational comedy group The Groundlings. While watching one of their performances, he impulsively decided to climb on stage and join the cast. His first onscreen appearance was in 1978's Stunt Rock, an Australian film directed in Los Angeles by Brian Trenchard-Smith. After several years of training, paying his way by redesigning the group's logo and merchandise, Hartman formally joined The Groundlings and by 1979 was one of the show's stars.

There Hartman befriended Paul Reubens, with whom he often collaborated on comedic material. Together they created the character Pee-wee Herman and developed The Pee-wee Herman Show, a live stage show that subsequently aired on HBO in 1981. Hartman played Captain Carl in the show, and reprised the role for the children's TV show Pee-wee's Playhouse. Reubens and Hartman made cameos in the 1980 film Cheech and Chong's Next Movie. Hartman co-wrote the script of the 1985 feature film Pee-wee's Big Adventure and had a cameo role as a reporter. He had considered quitting acting at the age of 36 due to the challenges of finding work; but the success of Pee-wee's Big Adventure changed his mind. After a creative disagreement with Reubens, he left the Pee-Wee Herman project to pursue other roles.

In addition to his work with Reubens, Hartman recorded a number of voice-over roles. These included appearances on the animated television programs The Smurfs, Challenge of the GoBots, The 13 Ghosts of Scooby-Doo, and in Dennis the Menace as Henry Mitchell and George Wilson and most of the adult male characters. After season 1, Hartman (who by this point had joined the cast of Saturday Night Live) was replaced by Maurice LaMarche. He also developed a strong persona providing voice-overs for advertisements, and worked as part of an automated dialogue replacement group on several films, including Spaceballs, alongside Rob Paulsen, Tress MacNielle and others.

=== Saturday Night Live (1986–1994) ===
After appearances in the 1986 films Jumpin' Jack Flash and Three Amigos, Hartman successfully auditioned to join NBC's variety show Saturday Night Live (SNL) in its 12th season, which began on October 11, 1986. He had been recommended for the show by fellow Groundlings and SNL cast members Jon Lovitz and Laraine Newman, as well as Jumpin' Jack Flash director Penny Marshall. He told the Los Angeles Times, "I wanted to do [SNL] because I wanted to get the exposure that would give me box-office credibility so I can write movies for myself." In his eight seasons with the show Hartman became known for his impressions, and performed as over 70 different characters. Hartman's original SNL characters include Eugene, the Anal Retentive Chef and Unfrozen Caveman Lawyer. His impressions include Frank Sinatra, Ronald Reagan, Ed McMahon, Barbara Bush, Charlton Heston, Kelsey Grammer, Michael Caine, Oliver Stone, Phil Donahue, Telly Savalas, Barry Humphries, Kirk Douglas, and Bill Clinton—the latter considered his best-known impression.

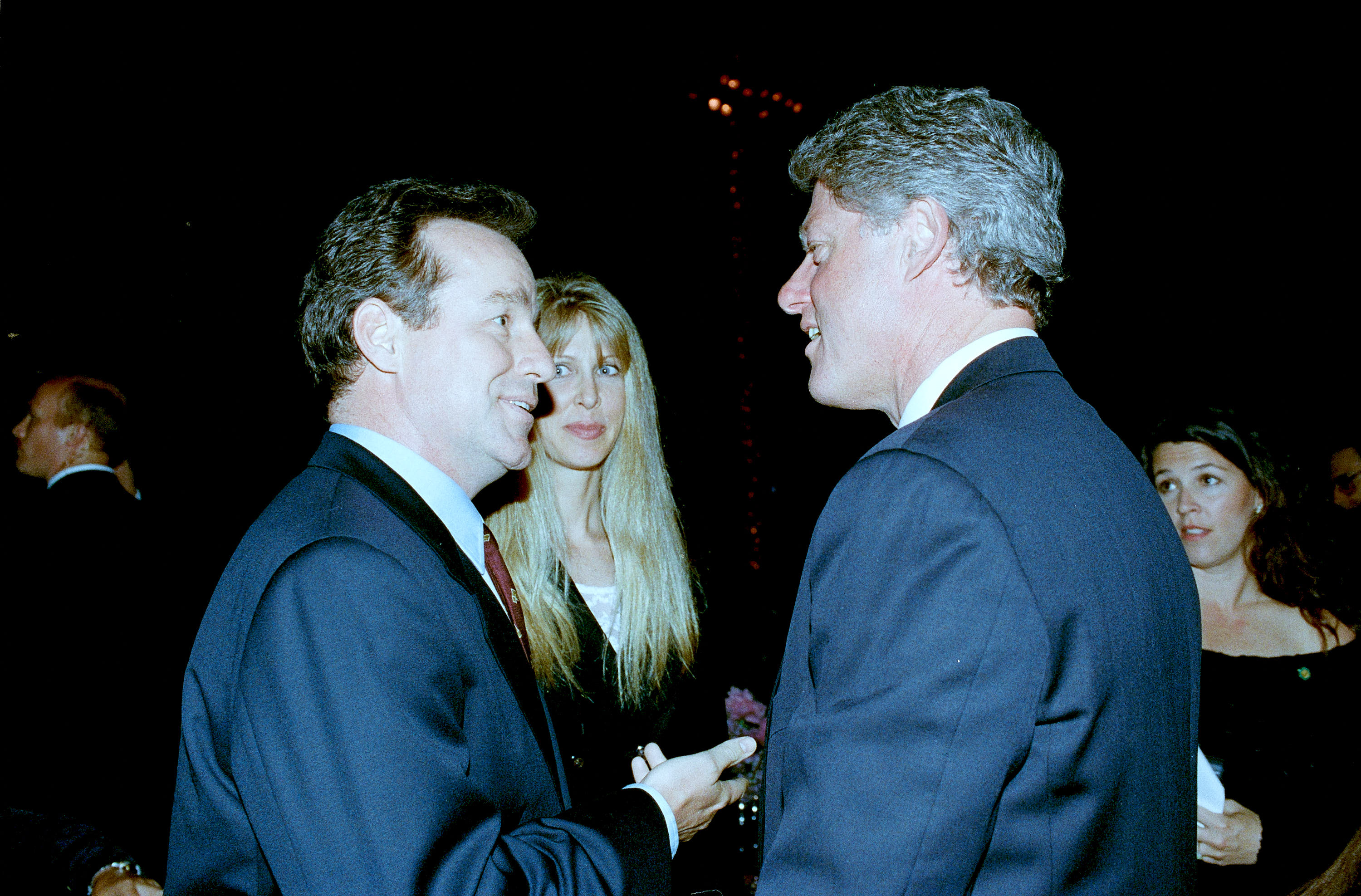
President Clinton greeting Phil Hartman at a Democratic National Committee Presidential Gala at the Lincoln Center in New York, May 12, 1993.

Hartman first performed his Clinton impression on an episode of The Tonight Show. When he met Clinton in 1993, Hartman remarked, "I guess I owe you a few apologies," adding later that he "sometimes [felt] a twinge of guilt about [his Clinton impression]." Clinton showed good humor and sent Hartman a signed photo with the text: "You're not the president, but you play one on TV. And you're OK, mostly." (Note: This is a reference to a prominent Vicks cough syrup advertisement, in which actor Peter Bergman states, "I'm not a doctor, but I play one on TV.") Hartman copied the president's "post-nasal drip" and the "slight scratchiness" in his voice, as well as his open, "less intimidating" hand gestures. Hartman opted against wearing a larger prosthetic nose when portraying Clinton, as he thought it would be distracting. He instead wore a wig, dyed his eyebrows brighter, and used makeup to highlight his nose. In one of Hartman's sketches as Clinton, the president-elect visits a McDonald's restaurant and explains his economic policies and support for Operation Restore Hope, the military intervention in Somalia, by the metaphor of eating other customers' food.

Hartman appears as Bill Clinton on Saturday Night Live.

At SNL, Hartman's nickname of "Glue" was coined by Adam Sandler according to Jay Mohr's book Gasping for Airtime. However, according to You Might Remember Me: The Life and Times of Phil Hartman by Mike Thomas, author and staff writer for the Chicago Sun-Times, the nickname was created by SNL cast member and Hartman's frequent on-screen collaborator Jan Hooks. Hartman was very helpful to other cast members. For example, he aided Hooks in overcoming her stage fright. SNL creator Lorne Michaels explained the name: "He kind of held the show together. He gave to everybody and demanded very little. He was very low-maintenance." Michaels added that Hartman was "the least appreciated" cast member by commentators outside the show, and praised his ability "to do five or six parts in a show where you're playing support or you're doing remarkable character work". Hartman won the Primetime Emmy Award for Outstanding Writing for a Variety, Music or Comedy Program for SNL in 1989, sharing the award with the show's other writers. He was nominated in the same category in 1987, and individually in 1994 for Outstanding Individual Performance in a Variety or Music Program.

By 1993, almost every cast member who was there during Hartman's first year on SNL had left the show, including Jon Lovitz, Jan Hooks, and Dana Carvey. Hartman said he felt "like an athlete who's watched all his World Series teammates get traded off into other directions ... It was hard to watch them leave because I sort of felt we were all part of the team that saved the show." This cast turnover contributed to his leaving the show in 1994. Hartman said he thought it was time to leave because the show was "getting less sophisticated" and his style of humor did not fit with the less intellectual comedy of newer cast members like Adam Sandler. Hartman had originally planned to leave the show in 1991, but Michaels persuaded him to stay to raise his profile; his portrayal of Clinton contributed to this goal. Jay Leno offered him the role of his sidekick on The Tonight Show but Hartman opted to stay on SNL. NBC persuaded him to stay on SNL by promising him his own comedy–variety show The Phil Show. He planned to "reinvent the variety form" with "a hybrid, very fast-paced, high energy [show] with sketches, impersonations, pet acts, and performers showcasing their talents". Hartman was to be the show's executive producer and head writer. Before production began, however, the network decided that variety shows were not popular enough, and canceled the series. In a 1996 interview, Hartman noted he was glad, as he "would've been sweatin' blood each week trying to make it work". In 1998, he admitted he missed working on SNL, but had enjoyed the move from New York City to Southern California.

=== NewsRadio (1995–1998) ===
Hartman became one of the stars of the NBC sitcom NewsRadio in 1995, portraying radio news anchor Bill McNeal. He signed up after being attracted by the show's writing and use of an ensemble cast, and joked that he based McNeal on himself with "any ethics and character" removed. Hartman made roughly US$50,000 (equivalent to $105,645 in 2025) per episode of NewsRadio. Although the show was critically acclaimed, it was never a ratings hit and cancellation was a regular threat. After the completion of the fourth season, Hartman commented, "We seem to have limited appeal. We're on the edge here, not sure we're going to be picked up or not", but added he was "99 percent sure" the series would be renewed for a fifth season. Hartman had publicly lambasted NBC's decision to repeatedly move NewsRadio into different timeslots, but later regretted his comments, saying, "this is a sitcom, for crying out loud, not brain surgery". He also stated that if the sitcom were cancelled "it just will open up other opportunities for me". Although the show was renewed for a fifth season, Hartman was killed before production began. Ken Tucker praised Hartman's performance as McNeal: "A lesser performer ... would have played him as a variation on The Mary Tyler Moore Show's Ted Baxter, because that's what Bill was, on paper. But Hartman gave infinite variety to Bill's self-centeredness, turning him devious, cowardly, squeamish, and foolishly bold from week to week." Hartman was posthumously nominated for the Primetime Emmy Award for Outstanding Supporting Actor in a Comedy Series in 1998 for his work on NewsRadio. David Hyde Pierce won the award for his performance on Frasier.

=== The Simpsons (1991–1998) ===
Hartman provided the voices for numerous characters on the Fox animated series The Simpsons, appearing in 52 episodes. He made his first appearance in the second season episode "Bart Gets Hit by a Car". Although he was originally brought in for a one-time appearance, Hartman enjoyed working on The Simpsons and the staff wrote additional parts for him. He voiced the recurring characters Lionel Hutz and Troy McClure, as well as several background characters. His favorite part was that of McClure, and he often used this voice to entertain the audience between takes while taping episodes of NewsRadio. He remarked, "My favorite fans are Troy McClure fans." He added "It's the one thing that I do in my life that's almost an avocation. I do it for the pure love of it."

Hartman was popular among the staff of The Simpsons. Showrunners Bill Oakley and Josh Weinstein said they enjoyed his work, and used him as much as possible when working on the show. To give Hartman a larger role, they developed the episode "A Fish Called Selma", which focuses on Troy McClure and expands the character's backstory. The Simpsons creator Matt Groening said that he "took [Hartman] for granted because he nailed the joke every time", and that his voice acting could produce "the maximum amount of humor" with any line he was given. Before his death, Hartman had expressed an interest in making a live action film about Troy McClure. Many of The Simpsons production staff expressed enthusiasm for the project and offered to help. Hartman said he was "looking forward to [McClure's] live-action movie, publicizing his Betty Ford appearances", and "would love nothing more" than making a film and was prepared to buy the film rights himself in order to make it happen.

=== Other work ===
Hartman's first starring film role came in 1995's Houseguest, alongside Sinbad. Other films include Greedy, Coneheads, Sgt. Bilko, So I Married an Axe Murderer, CB4, Jingle All the Way, the English Disney/GKIDS dub of Kiki's Delivery Service, and Small Soldiers, the latter of which is his final theatrically released film. At the same time, he preferred working on television. His other television roles include appearances on episodes of The John Larroquette Show, The Dana Carvey Show, 3rd Rock from the Sun, and the HBO TV film The Second Civil War as the President of the United States. He made a considerable amount of money from television advertising, earning $300,000 for a series of four commercials for the soft drink Slice. He also appeared in advertisements for McDonald's (as Hugh McAttack) and 1-800-Collect (as Max Jerome), as well as British advertisements for Golden Wonder's Pot Noodle, including Computer Graphic.

Hartman wrote a number of screenplays that were never produced. In 1986, he began writing a screenplay for a film titled Mr. Fix-It, and completed the final draft in 1991. Robert Zemeckis was signed to produce the film, with Gil Bettman hired to direct. Hartman called it "a sort of a merger of horror and comedy, like Beetlejuice and Throw Momma From the Train", adding, "It's an American nightmare about a family torn asunder. They live next to a toxic dump site, their water supply is poisoned, the mother and son go insane and try to murder each other, the father's face is torn off in a terrible disfiguring accident in the first act. It's heavy stuff, but it's got a good message and a positive, upbeat ending." Zemeckis could not secure studio backing, however, and the project collapsed. Another film idea involving Hartman's Groundlings character Chick Hazard, Private Eye was also canceled.

== Style ==
Clean and unassuming, he had such a casual, no-nonsense way about him. It was that quality that we all find so hilarious, his delightful ability to poke fun at himself and at life with a tongue-in-cheek attitude comparable to, say, Tim Conway or Mel Brooks or Carol Burnett.

— Nancy Cartwright

In contrast to his real-life personality, which was described as "a regular guy and, by all accounts, one of show business's most low-key, decent people", Hartman often played seedy, vain, or unpleasant characters as well as comedic villains. He described his standard character repertoire as the "jerky guy" and "the weasel parade", citing Lionel Hutz, Bill McNeal, Troy McClure, and Ted Maltin from Jingle All the Way as examples. Hartman enjoyed playing such roles because he "just want[ed] to be funny, and villains tend to be funny because their foibles are all there to see".

He often played supporting roles, rather than the lead part. He said: "[T]hroughout my career, I've never been a huge star, but I've made steady progress and that's the way I like it" and "It's fun coming in as the second or third lead. If the movie or TV show bombs, you aren't to blame." Hartman was considered a "utility player" on SNL with a "kind of Everyman quality" which enabled him to appear in the majority of sketches, often in very distinct roles. Jan Hooks stated of his work on SNL: "Phil never had an ounce of competition. He was a team player. It was a privilege for him, I believe, to play support and do it very well. He was never insulted, no matter how small the role may have been." He was disciplined in his performances, studying the scripts beforehand. Hooks added: "Phil knew how to listen. And he knew how to look you in the eye, and he knew the power of being able to lay back and let somebody else be funny, and then do the reactions. I think Phil was more of an actor than a comedian." Film critic Pauline Kael declared that "Phil Hartman and Jan Hooks on Saturday Night Live are two of the best comic actors I've ever seen."

Writer and acting coach Paul Ryan noted Hartman's work ethic with his impressions. He assembled a collection of video footage of the figure he was preparing to impersonate and watched this continually until he "completely embodied the person". Ryan concluded that "what made [Hartman's impressions] so funny and spot on was Phil's ability to add that perfect touch that only comes from trial and error and practicing in front of audiences and fellow actors." Hartman described this process as "technical". Journalist Lyle V. Harris said Hartman showed a "rare talent for morphing into... anybody he wanted to be".

Ken Tucker summarized Hartman's comedic style: "He could momentarily fool audiences into thinking he was the straight man, but then he'd cock an eyebrow and give his voice an ironic lilt that delivered a punchline like a fast slider—you barely saw it coming until you started laughing." Hartman claimed that he borrowed his style from actor Bill Murray: "He's been a great influence on me – when he did that smarmy thing in Ghostbusters, then the same sort of thing in Groundhog Day. I tried to imitate it. I couldn't. I wasn't good enough. But I discovered an element of something else, so in a sick kind of way I made myself a career by doing a bad imitation of another comic."

== Personal life ==
Hartman married Gretchen Lewis in 1970, and they divorced in September 1972. He married real estate agent Lisa Strain in 1982, and they divorced in 1985. Strain later told People magazine that Hartman was reclusive off screen and "would disappear emotionally ... he'd be in his own world. That passivity made you crazy."

In 1987, Hartman married former model and aspiring actress Brynn Omdahl (born Vicki Jo Omdahl, April 11, 1958 – May 28, 1998), having met her on a blind date the previous year. They had two children. The marriage had difficulties; she was reportedly intimidated by his success and was frustrated that she could not find any on her own, although neither party wanted a divorce. She was reportedly jealous and often verbally or physically abusive, even sending a letter to Strain, threatening to "rip [Strain's] eyes out" if she spoke to Phil again. He considered retiring to save the marriage.

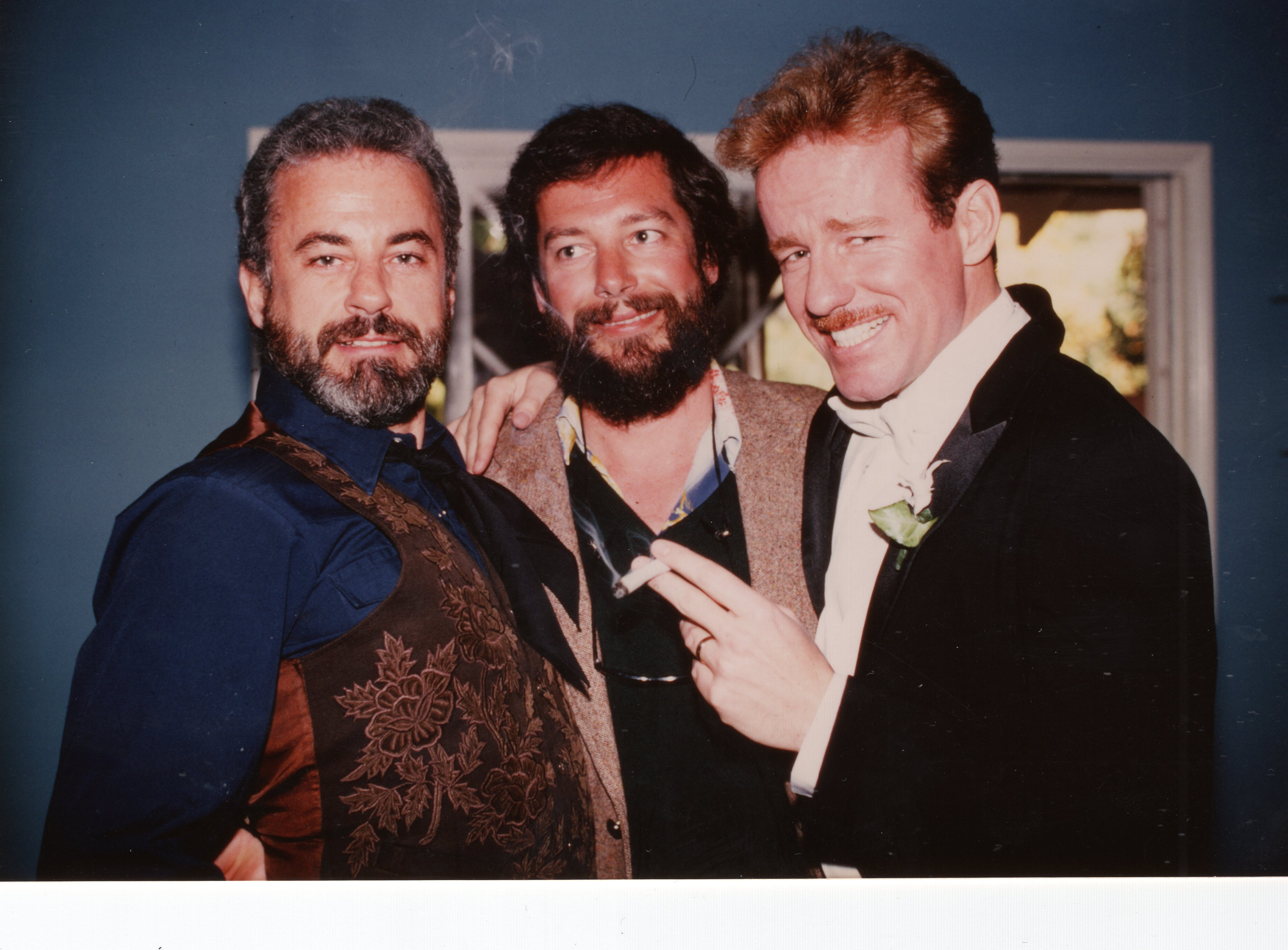
Hartman (right) with his brothers Paul (center) and John (left) at a wedding,1987

Phil tried to get his wife acting roles, but she became progressively reliant on alcohol and narcotics, entering rehab several times. On multiple occasions, he removed their children from the household to stay with friends or family because of her drug- and alcohol-fueled outbursts. Because of his close friendship with SNL associate Jan Hooks, Brynn "joked" on occasion that he and Hooks were married "on some other level".

NewsRadio co-star Stephen Root said few people knew "the real Phil Hartman", as he was "one of those people who never seemed to come out of character", but he nevertheless gave the impression of a family man who cared deeply for his children. Hartman befriended Joe Rogan during his time on NewsRadio, and confided his marital problems to him. Rogan said that he encouraged Hartman to divorce Brynn five times, but "[Hartman] loved his kids and didn't want to leave".

Hartman stated in 1997 that, though a non-practicing Catholic, he displayed a sense of religiousness. In his spare time, he enjoyed driving, flying, sailing, marksmanship, and playing the guitar.

Hartman's legal name, spelled with an additional 'n', was changed to his professional name in 1992. Hartman did so according to the writings of I Ching; his birth name's destiny number was 8, leading to family life and ambition, whereas his professional name led to a destiny number of 3, resulting in both the "pinnacle of creativity" and the "height of artistic fulfillment".

== Murder and investigation ==
On May 27, 1998, Brynn Hartman visited a restaurant and had drinks with producer and writer Christine Zander, who said she was "in a good frame of mind". After she returned home, she and Phil had a "heated" argument, after which he went to bed. She entered his bedroom some time before 3:00 a.m. PDT on May 28, 1998, and, as he slept, she fatally shot him with a .38-caliber revolver: once between the eyes, once in the throat, and once in the upper chest. He was 49 years old. She was taking Zoloft, had been drinking alcohol, and had recently used cocaine.

Brynn then drove to the home of her friend Ron Douglas and confessed to the killing, but he did not initially believe her. After finding and removing a gun from her purse, Douglas followed Brynn back to the house in his own car. On the way, she called another friend and confessed again. Upon seeing Hartman's body, Douglas called 9-1-1 at 6:20 a.m. The Los Angeles Police Department (LAPD) arrived and escorted Douglas and the Hartmans' two children – 6 and 9 years old – from the premises, by which time Brynn had locked herself in the bedroom. Shortly afterward, she shot herself with another handgun, dying at the age of 40.

The LAPD stated Hartman's death was caused by "domestic discord" between the couple. A neighbor of the Hartmans told a CNN reporter that the couple had marital problems. Conversely, actor Steve Guttenberg said they had been "a very happy couple and they always had the appearance of being well-balanced".

Brynn's brother Gregory Omdahl filed a wrongful death lawsuit in 1999 against both Pfizer, the manufacturer of Zoloft, and his sister's psychiatrist, Arthur Sorosky, who had provided samples of the antidepressant to Brynn. Pfizer later settled the lawsuit without an admission of any wrongdoing. Hartman's friend and former SNL colleague Jon Lovitz accused NewsRadio co-star Andy Dick of reintroducing Brynn to cocaine, causing her to relapse and suffer a nervous breakdown. Dick claimed to have known nothing of her condition.

Brynn's sister Katharine Omdahl and brother-in-law Mike Wright raised the two Hartman children. Hartman's will stipulated each child would inherit money over several years after turning 25. The total value of Hartman's estate was estimated at $1.23 million. In accordance with their wishes, both Hartman's and Brynn's bodies were cremated by Forest Lawn Memorial Park and Mortuary, Glendale, California, and their ashes were scattered over Santa Catalina Island's Emerald Bay. A cenotaph with Hartman's and Brynn's names was installed at a cemetery in Thief River Falls, Minnesota, where Brynn was born.

=== Response and legacy ===
NBC executive Don Ohlmeyer stated that Hartman "was blessed with a tremendous gift for creating characters who made people laugh. Everyone who had the pleasure of working with Phil knows that he was a man of tremendous warmth, a true professional and a loyal friend." Guttenberg expressed shock at Hartman's death and Steve Martin said he was "a deeply funny and very happy person.". Matt Groening called him "a master" and director Joe Dante said "He was one of those guys who was a dream to work with. I don't know anybody who didn't like him." Dan Snierson of Entertainment Weekly concluded that Hartman was "the last person you'd expect to read about in lurid headlines in your morning paper" and "a decidedly regular guy, beloved by everyone he worked with". In 2007, Entertainment Weekly ranked Hartman the 87th greatest television icon of all time, and Maxim named him the top Saturday Night Live performer of all time.

On the day of Hartman's death, rehearsals for The Simpsons and that night's performance by The Groundlings were canceled. The season five premiere episode of NewsRadio, "Bill Moves On" (aired September 23, the day before what would have been his 50th birthday) finds Hartman's character, Bill McNeal, has died of a heart attack, while the other characters reminisce about his life. Lovitz joined the show in his place beginning with the next episode. A cliffhanger episode, where Hartman played a flamboyant recurring character, who ends up kidnapping Harry, had ended a season of 3rd Rock from the Sun. To show respect for Hartman’s death, his character was absent from the season premiere and only mentioned in passing in the subsequent episodes. A special episode of Saturday Night Live commemorating Hartman's work on the show aired on June 13, 1998, which ended with one of Hartman's performances showing a widow reflecting on her youth with an old flame, played by Hartman. Rather than substituting another voice actor, the writers of The Simpsons retired Hartman's characters. His final appearance in the tenth season episode "Bart the Mother" is dedicated to him. Small Soldiers was dedicated to Hartman, being his final film to be released in movie theatres.

Hartman was preparing to voice Zapp Brannigan, a character written specifically for him on Groening's second animated series Futurama, at the time of his death. Even though the role was specifically made for him, Hartman still insisted on trying out for the role. About a week before his death, he auditioned for Groening and Futurama executive producer David X. Cohen. Groening wrote that Hartman "blew us away with his performances". After Hartman's death, Billy West took over the role. Though Cohen credits West with using his own take on the character, West later said that he purposely tweaked Zapp's voice to better match Hartman's intended portrayal. Hartman was planning to appear with Lovitz in the indie film The Day of Swine and Roses, scheduled to begin production in August 1998.

In 2002, Laugh.com and Hartman's brother John published the album Flat TV, a selection of comedy sketches recorded by Hartman in the 1970s, which had been kept in storage. John Hartman commented: "I'm putting this out there because I'm dedicating my life to fulfilling his dreams. This [album] is my brother doing what he loved." Flat TV was optioned for an animated adaptation by Michael "Ffish" Hemschoot's animation company Worker Studio in 2013. The deal came about after Michael T. Scott, a partner in the company, posted online a handwritten letter he had received from Hartman in 1997, leading to a correspondence between Scott and Paul Hartmann.

A campaign was started on Facebook by Alex Stevens in 2007, and endorsed by Hartman's brother Paul, to have Phil inducted to Canada's Walk of Fame. Among the campaign's numerous publicity events, Ben Miner of the Sirius XM Radio channel Laugh Attack dedicated the month of April 2012 to Hartman. The campaign ended in success and Hartman was inducted on September 22, 2012, to the Walk of Fame, with Paul accepting the award on his late brother's behalf. Hartman was also awarded the Cineplex Legends Award. In June 2013, it was announced that Hartman would receive a star on the Hollywood Walk of Fame, which was unveiled on August 26, 2014. Additionally, a special prize at the Canadian Comedy Awards was named for Hartman. Beginning with the 13th Canadian Comedy Awards in 2012, the Phil Hartman Award was awarded to "an individual who helps to better the Canadian comedy community". In 2015, Rolling Stone magazine ranked Hartman as one of the ten greatest Saturday Night Live cast members throughout the show's forty-year history, coming in seventh on its list of all 141 members.

== Filmography ==
=== Film ===
Film work by Phil Hartman
Year	Title	Role	Notes
1978	Stunt Rock	Monique's Assistant	
1980	The Gong Show Movie	Man at airport with gun	Credited as Phil Hartmann
1980	Cheech & Chong's Next Movie	Actor being filmed in the background	
1982	Pandemonium	Reporter	Credited as Phil Hartmann
1984	Weekend Pass	Joe Chicago	
1985	Pee-wee's Big Adventure	Reporter / Rodeo announcer	Also co-writer
1986	Last Resort	Jean-Michel	
1986	Jumpin' Jack Flash	Fred	Credited as Phil E. Hartmann
1986	Three Amigos!	Sam	Credited as Phil E. Hartmann
1987	Blind Date	Ted Davis	
1987	The Brave Little Toaster	Hanging lamp (credited), Air conditioner (uncredited)	Voice
1987	Amazon Women on the Moon	Baseball announcer	Voice
1987	Spaceballs	Additional voice(s)	Voice
1989	Fletch Lives	Bly manager	
1989	How I Got into College	Bennedict	
1990	Quick Change	Hal Edison	
1993	Loaded Weapon 1	Officer Davis	
1993	CB4	Virgil Robinson	
1993	Coneheads	Marlax	
1993	So I Married an Axe Murderer	John "Vicky" Johnson	
1994	Greedy	Frank McTeague	
1994	The Pagemaster	Tom Morgan	Voice
1995	The Crazysitter	The Salesman	
1995	Houseguest	Gary Young	
1995	Stuart Saves His Family	Announcer	Uncredited
1996	Sgt. Bilko	Major Colin Thorn	
1996	Jingle All the Way	Ted Maltin	
1998	Kiki's Delivery Service	Jiji	Voice, Disney English dub; Posthumously released, dedicated in memory
1998	Small Soldiers	Phil Fimple	Posthumously released, dedicated in memory
1998	Buster & Chauncey's Silent Night	Chauncey	Voice, direct-to-video; Posthumously released (final film role)

=== Television ===
Television work by Phil Hartman
Year	Title	Role	Notes
1979	Scooby-Doo and Scrappy-Doo	Additional voices	
1980	The Six O'Clock Follies	Unnamed role	
1981	The Pee-wee Herman Show	Captain Carl / Monsieur LeCroc	Television special; also writer
1981	The Smurfs	Additional voices	
1982	The Little Rascals	Additional voices	
1983	The Pop 'N Rocker Game	Announcer	
1983	The Dukes	Various voices	7 episodes
1984	Challenge of the GoBots	Various voices	
1984	The New Scooby Doo Mysteries	Various voices	
1984	Pink Panther and Sons	Various voices	
1984	Magnum, P.I.	Newsreader	Episode: "The Legacy of Garwood Huddle"
1985	Sara	Drake	Episode: "27 Candles"
1985	The 13 Ghosts of Scooby-Doo	Additional voices	Episode: "It's a Wonderful Scoob"
1985	The Jetsons	School Patrol robots / Executive Vice-president	Voice, episode: "Boy George"
1986	Dennis the Menace	Henry Mitchell / George Wilson / Various voices	
1986	Pee-wee's Playhouse	Captain Carl	6 episodes
1986–1994	Saturday Night Live	Various characters	155 episodes; also writer
1987	DuckTales	Captain Frye	Voice, episode: "Scrooge's Pet"
1987	Foofur	Additional voices	
1988	Fantastic Max	Additional voices	
1990	Bill and Ted's Excellent Adventures	Additional voices	Episode: "One Sweet and Sour Chinese Adventure to Go"
1990	On the Television	Various characters	Episode: "M. Superior"
1990	TaleSpin	Ace London	Voice, episode: "Mach One for the Gipper"
1990	The Adventures of Don Coyote and Sancho Panda	Additional voices	
1990	Gravedale High	Billy Headstone	Voice, episode: "Cleo's Pen Pal"
1990	Tiny Toon Adventures	Octavius	Voice, episode: "Whale's Tales"
1991	Captain Planet and the Planeteers	Dimitri the Russian Ambassador / TV Reporter	Voice, episode: "Mind Pollution"
1991	Sesame Street	Employee of the ABC Moving Company	Episode: 2800
1991	Empty Nest	Tim Cornell	Episode: "Guess Who's Coming to Dinner?"
1991	Darkwing Duck	Paddywhack	Voice, episode: "The Haunting of Mr. Banana Brain"
1991	One Special Victory	Mike Rutten	Television film
1991–1998	The Simpsons	Troy McClure / Lionel Hutz / Various others	Voice, 52 episodes
1991–1993	Tom & Jerry Kids	Calaboose Cal	Voice
1992	Fish Police	Inspector C. Bass	Voice, episode: "A Fish Out of Water"
1992	Parker Lewis Can't Lose	Phil Diamond	Episode: "Lewis and Son"
1992	Eek! The Cat	Monkeynaut #1 / Psycho Bunny	Voice, 2 episodes
1993	Daybreak	Man in abstinence commercial	Uncredited; Television film
1993	Droopy, Master Detective	Additional voices	
1993	Animaniacs	Dan Anchorman	Voice, episode: "Broadcast Nuisance"
1993	The Twelve Days of Christmas	Additional voices	Television film
1993	The Larry Sanders Show	Himself	Episode: "The Stalker"
1994	How the Grinch Stole Christmas! Special Edition	Host	TV Short
1994	The Critic	Various voices	Episode: "Eyes on the Prize"
1995	The Show Formerly Known as the Martin Short Show	Various characters	Television special
1995	The John Larroquette Show	Otto Friedling	Episode: "A Moveable Feast"
1995	The Ren & Stimpy Show	American pig / Sid the Clown	Voice, 2 episodes: "Space Dogged", "Stimpy's Pet"
1995	Night Stand with Dick Dietrick	Gunther Johann	Episode: "Illegal Alien Star Search"
1995–1998	NewsRadio	Bill McNeal	75 episodes
1996	The Dana Carvey Show	Larry King	Episode: "The Mountain Dew Dana Carvey Show"
1996	Caroline in the City	Host	Uncredited; Episode: "Caroline and the Letter"
1996	Seinfeld	Man on phone	Episode: "The Package"; uncredited
1996	Saturday Night Live	Himself (host) / various roles	2 episodes
1996, 1998	3rd Rock from the Sun	Phillip / Randy	2 episodes
1997	The Second Civil War	President of the United States	Television film
1999	Happily Ever After: Fairy Tales for Every Child	Game show host	Voice, episode: "The Empress's Nightingale"; Posthumously aired (final appearance)

=== Video games ===
Video game work by Phil Hartman
Year	Title	Voice roles
1997	Virtual Springfield	Troy McClure; Lionel Hutz
1998	Blasto	Captain Blasto

== Theater ==
Theater work by Phil Hartman
Year	Title	Role
1981	The Pee-wee Herman Show	Captain Carl / Monsieur LeCroq

Theme park attractions with Phil Hartman
Year	Title	Voice roles
1995	ExtraTERRORestrial Alien Encounter	T.O.M. 2000
1998	The Enchanted Tiki Room (Under New Management)	Morris

== Discography ==
The following is a list of albums for which Hartman designed the covers.

Year	Artist	Album
1974	Poco	Seven
1975	America	Hearts
1975	America	History: America's Greatest Hits
1976	Silver	Silver
1977	America	Harbor
1977	Poco	Legend
1979	America	Silent Letter
1980	Firesign Theatre	Fighting Clowns
