= Stupid Sidekick Union =

- The Ren & Stimpy Show episode
- Episode no.: Season 5 Episode 2
- Directed by: Tom McGrath (credit only); Ron Hughart (uncredited)
- Written by: Bob Camp; Jim Gomez
- Production code: RS-423
- Original air date: March 18, 1995

Episode chronology
| ← Previous "Ol' Blue Nose" | Next → "Space Dogged" |

"Stupid Sidekick Union" is the second episode of the fifth season of The Ren & Stimpy Show. It originally aired on Nickelodeon in the United States on March 18, 1995.

== Plot ==
During a taping a show that Ren and Stimpy star on their own, the episode plays out as normal, with Stimpy feigning his stupidity and Ren abusing him regularly as planned. Then Stimpy receives a phone call in the middle of an episode, interrupting the episode by immediately breaking character and denying Ren the right to beat him up as he, a "stupid" sidekick, had joined a labor union named "Stupid Sidekick Union 6 7/8". He reverts to his real-life personality status, a disgruntled, more intelligent individual while Ren acts just the same as he does in the show. Ren refuses to sign Stimpy's contract in hopes of getting approval by hitting him, causing a walk out to happen. Because of this, Ren seizes his blue nose, which was in fact a prop.

Ren calls the "Scab Sidekick Union" for a sidekick, only for them to send a intellectually disabled strikebreaker. One such is from the Deep South named Tex, who claims to have a wooden head. He reluctantly hires Tex, which on their first episode summons a stampede of buffaloes and brands Ren's buttocks with a branding iron. Tex is immediately fired by Ren and recruited by Stimpy into the union.

More strikebreakers, including Myron (the sidekick of Haggis MacHaggis) and someone who resembles Barney Rubble from The Flintstones, join the casting call. Series of wieners were thrown to each applicant as they were all rejected, except for only one, and that was the baboon. It would win the job for intimidating Ren, in a more vicious way. Their first episode consists of the baboon mauling Ren after he is angered by a wildebeest carcass placed by the baboon. The last applicant, a classical Shakesperean character actor, is hired for being experienced but walks out due to Stimpy's role not fitting his expertise.

Ren decides to star the show on his own terms. Stimpy, thinly disguised as a girl, notices his onstage meltdown and begs Ren to sign an autograph, which in fact happens to be his contract. Ren sees through the trick (but not Stimpy's disguise) and signs under a pseudonym as "George Washington" on it. This in fact endorses the contract and forces all employers to hire their sidekicks, at the expense that they adhere to their sidekick's requests before assaulting them. Ren is regulated to secondary role of what would now be titled as "The Stimpy & Ren Show", asking for Stimpy's permission and paying him to slap him; he does not hesitate to slap as much as he wants, even if Stimpy considers it "overtime" by demanding more royalty payment.

== Cast ==
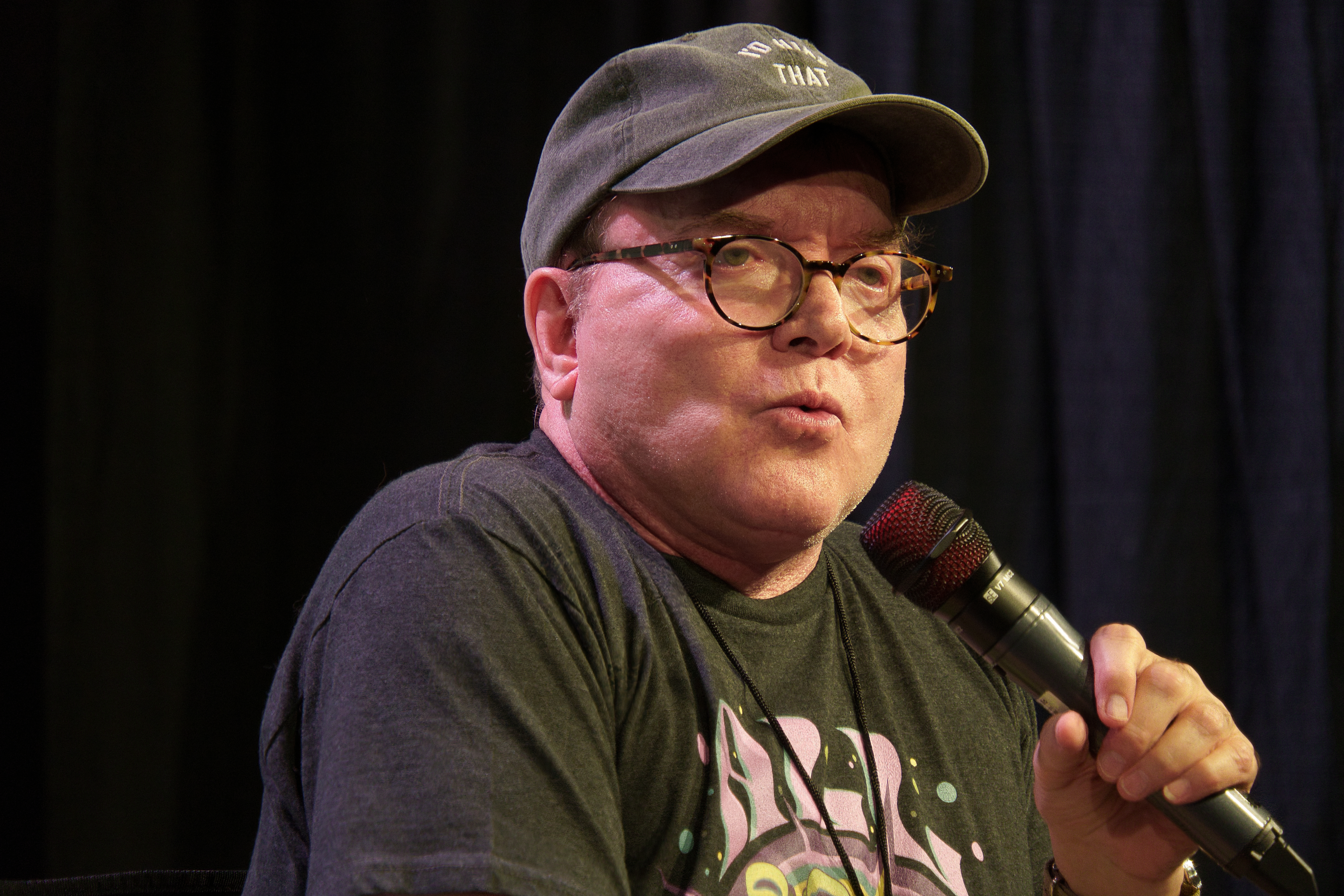
Billy West (pictured; 2023) used his idea for Stimpy to go out of character as an idea for an episode about a show within a show.

- Billy West as Ren, Stimpy and Shakespearean actor
- Bob Camp as Tex and the baboon

== Production ==
The episode was originally directed by Ron Hughart, who would later go on to work for Fox Television Animation to direct select episodes of Futurama and would become supervising director for American Dad!, but future DreamWorks animator Tom McGrath, later known for Madagascar, Megamind and The Boss Baby, was eventually rewarded the role for competently improving on the episode. Hughart was around since series creator John Kricfalusi and his Spümcø crew were involved in the show's production. He was regarded to be reliable by Kricfalusi and Nickelodeon executives, once he was hired to direct the episode "Haunted House". Stephen DeStefano also served as the episode's storyboard artist during production, before McGrath also revamped the storyboards for improvement. Both McGrath and DeStefano were brought onboard by Nick's new in-house studio Games Animation, after Kricfalusi was fired by Nick executives following his toxic behavior, as well as the episode "Man's Best Friend", which caused the network to pull from airings and also terminate his position from his workplace for good. Both were aware with his actions and felt vulnerable as a result when the two were brought to Games, criticizing his erratic, malevolent behavior.

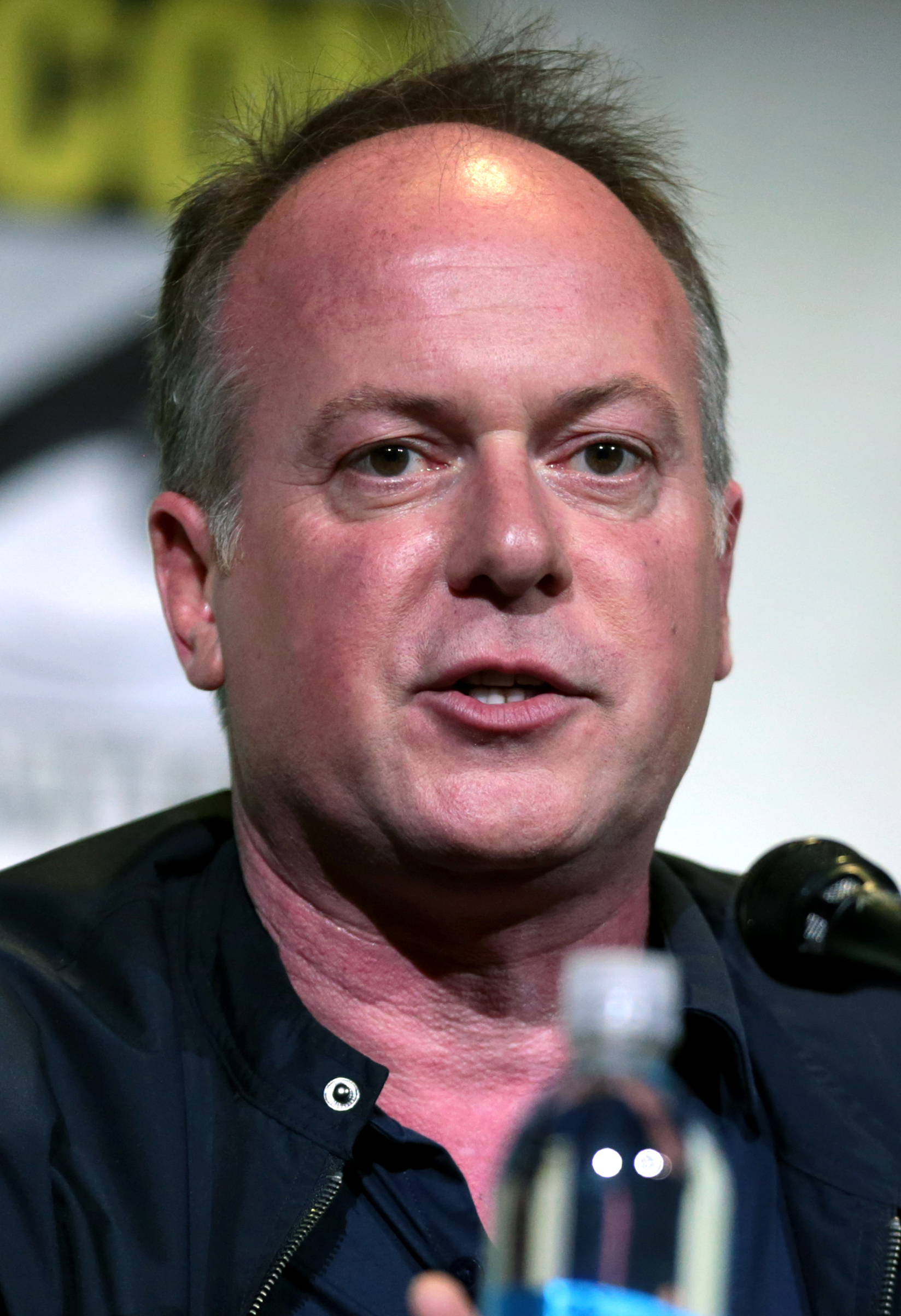
Tom McGrath (pictured; 2016), who provided storyboards for season 4, took position to finish up the episode in place of regulars Ron Hughart and Stephen DeStefano.

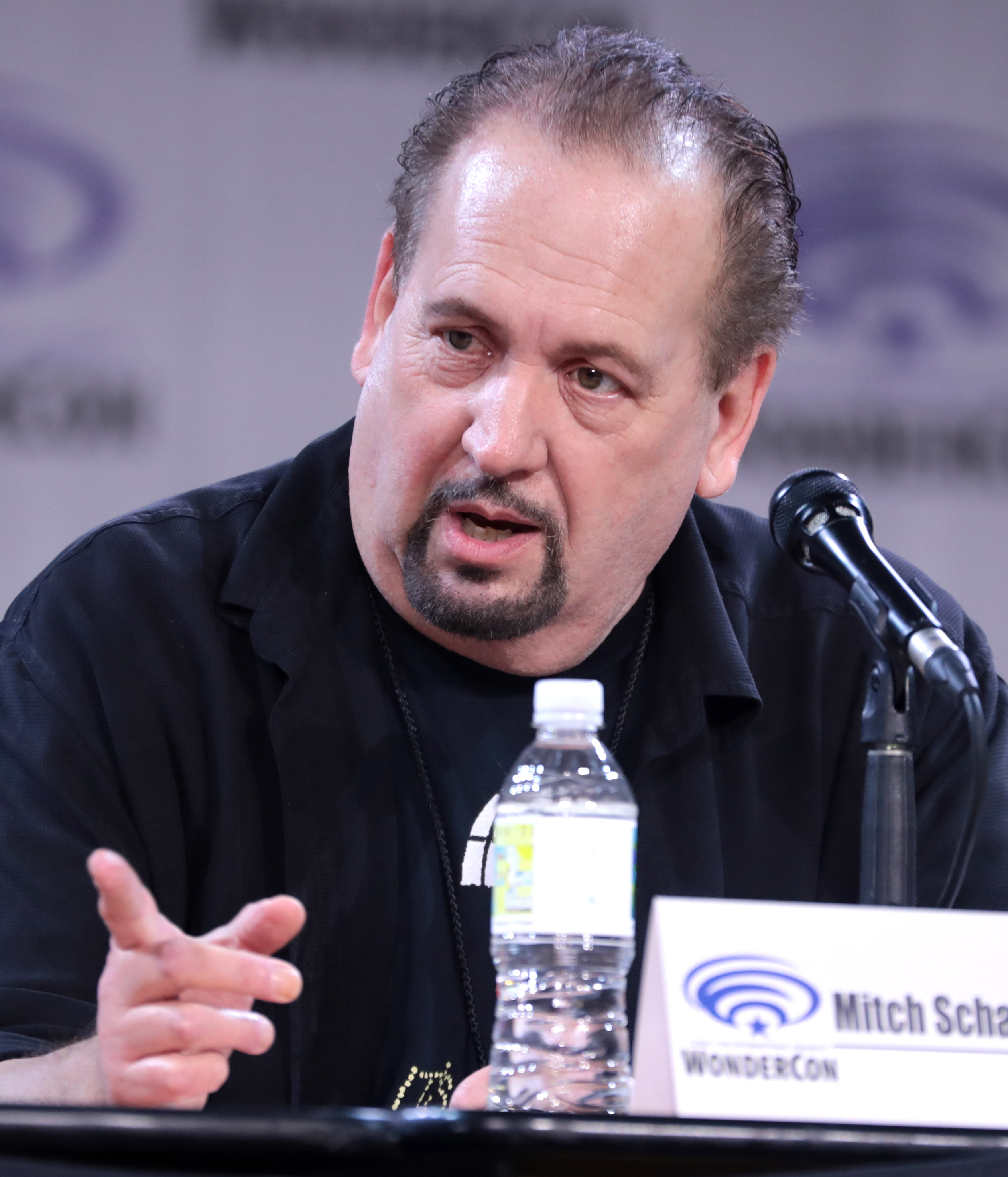
Mitch Schauer (pictured; 2023) provided additional storyboard material for this episode, which ended up being uncredited for the final product.

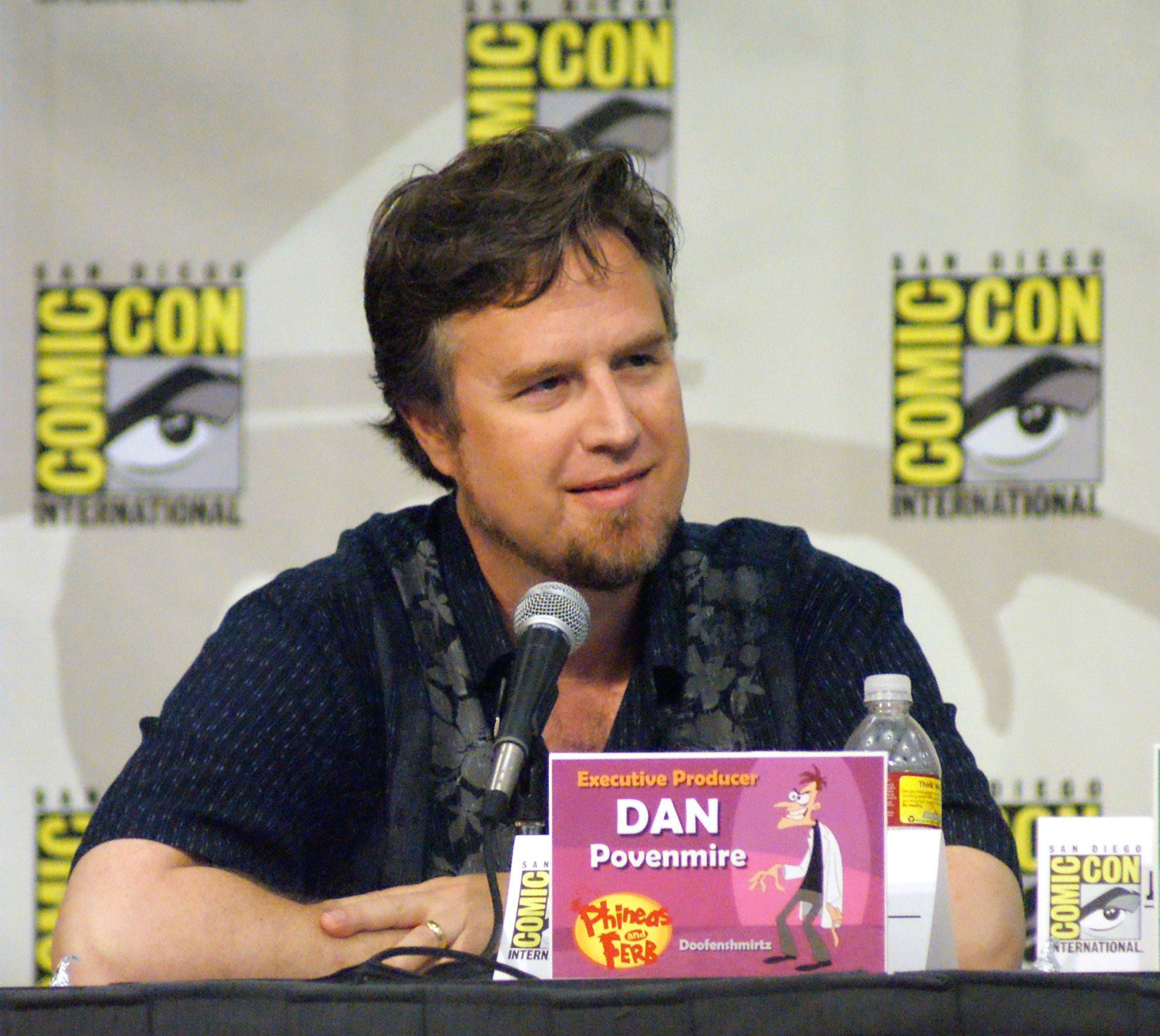
Dan Povenmire (pictured; 2009), along with Jeff "Swampy" Marsh, also provided additional storyboard material for this episode, which also ended up being uncredited for the final product.

Mitch Schauer also worked on the episode as assistant storyboard artist. Schauer had successfully pitched The Angry Beavers to Games Animation while working on then-upcoming Freakazoid! for Warner Bros. Animation and Amblin Television, and he was working on Rocko's Modern Life for Games at the same exact time while making this episode. Dan Povenmire and Jeff "Swampy" Marsh also worked on the episode under additional storyboard artists. The duo were also working on Rocko for Games, and would later develop Phineas and Ferb for Disney Television Animation, after failing to pitch it to Games, and later on to its own in-name studio, during the former's time working on SpongeBob SquarePants. Ultimately for the final product of the episode, only the five crew members (Hughart, DeStefano, Schauer, Povenmire and Marsh) had their names left uncredited, respectively. The former two for most of their ideas were also left unused in addition.

As is the case with season three's "Circus Midgets", this episode did not provide actual commentary for its DVD release from Kricfalusi nor any of his original Spümcø cast and crew, but its commentary was rather provided with comedic effect by Ren (voiced by Kricfalusi), Stimpy (voiced by Eric Bauza), and George Liquor (voiced by Michael Pataki). It was included as an easter egg in a bonus feature on the second disc for its release.

== Reception ==
American journalist Thad Komorowski gave the episode three out of five stars, noting that Stimpy's cruel, out of character behavior towards Reh ruined it from being a classic episode.

== Books and articles ==
- Dobbs, G. Michael (2015). Escape – How Animation Broke into the Mainstream in the 1990s. Orlando: BearManor Media. ISBN 978-1593931100.
- Komorowski, Thad (2017). Sick Little Monkeys: The Unauthorized Ren & Stimpy Story. Albany, Georgia: BearManor Media. ISBN 978-1629331836.
