= A Visit to Anthony =

- The Ren & Stimpy Show episode
- Episode no.: Season 2 Episode 17
- Directed by: John Kricfalusi; Jim Smith
- Story by: John Kricfalusi; Richard Pursel
- Production code: RS5-10
- Original air date: May 8, 1993

Guest appearances
- Randy Quaid as Anthony's Father; Anthony Raspanti as himself

Episode chronology
| ← Previous "Stimpy's Fan Club" | Next → "The Royal Canadian Kilted Yaksmen" |

"A Visit to Anthony" is the eighteenth and penultimate episode of the second season of The Ren & Stimpy Show. It originally aired on Nickelodeon in the United States on May 8, 1993.

== Plot ==
Ren and Stimpy are revealed to live in Hollywood, Yugoslavia when they receive a letter from an American boy named Anthony. They donate their costumes and swim across the Atlantic Ocean to the United States.

Anthony and his mother meet Ren and Stimpy. His mother approves of their presence but is not so sure about his father. The duo go into Anthony's room, where he had stored a large collection of the merchandise of the series. He asks them to make their eyes bulge out, a common visual gag in the series, which they explain to be a practical effect; Anthony almost suffers a panic attack from disbelief but Ren manages to do so by sticking his finger into his navel, achieving the same effect. Anthony succeeds, but Stimpy accidentally blows up his nose instead.

At night, they go to sleep at Anthony's room. He wakes up to go to the toilet, only to find the duo inside; he has a panic attack again as he could not believe cartoon characters use the toilet. Anthony's mother asks them to go away to avoid notifying Anthony's angry father, who immediately appears. A stern but ultimately caring figure, he demands the duo not to frighten or harm his son, to which they agree.

Anthony and the duo go out to play, only for Ren to be hit by a football by the school bully Victor. Despite being a fan of the show, he beats up the trio with ease before returning to his father's car. Victor's father is a similarly violent and unempathetic figure; both smoke cigars while driving away.

Ren and Stimpy wake up to find Anthony hyperventilating and unconscious. They realize what will happen to them if his father sees them, who immediately appears; he prays to God for his son's safety and demands Ren and Stimpy to meet him at the house. After he puts Anthony, who turns out to be fine, to bed, Anthony's father approaches Ren and Stimpy menacingly and gives them an intimidating lecture, which involved showing them his hands, hard and lumpy from years of hard work, and intimidating them with a "joke". Despite what seemed like an attempt to harm the duo, it turns out to be a misunderstanding, where he was merely offended by the duo's intrusion, while also being interested by how the duo move. Stimpy spits a hairball on Ren, which Anthony's father finds humorous, alongside Anthony and his mother. The family enjoy a wholesome moment bonding while watching this gruesome act, while Anthony's father finally accepts the duo's presence. Ren and Stimpy are confused by the bizarre experience, ending the episode.

== Cast ==
- Ren – voice of Billy West
- Stimpy – voice of Billy West
- Mom – voice of Cheryl Chase
- Dad – voice of Randy Quaid
- Victor – voice of Danny Cooksey
- Anthony Raspanti – himself
- Victor's dad – voice of Billy West

== Production ==
After the first two episodes aired on August 11, 1991, John Kricfalusi received a fan letter from a boy in Newport News, Virginia, Anthony Raspanti, that read: "Dear Ren & Stimpy, I hope you can come visit us in our country – the United States of America. And please bring your costumes. I like you very much. I really enjoyed your show tonight, especially when Ren and Stimpy found each other again". Raspanti's letter inspired Kricfalusi to do an episode where Ren and Stimpy would visit Raspanti, and Raspanti would voice his cartoon counterpart. Kricfalusi stated that his intentions were to "involve the audience more with the cartoon, so the children will feel like the characters are their friends". Nickelodeon executives approved of the idea, but grew more nervous as the production continued at a sluggish pace. Will McRobb praised the episode's concept and approved of its production.

Bill Wray noted that "A Visit to Anthony" was another episode that was "John's primal scream against his father". Kricfalusi is the son of Michael Kricfalusi, a serviceman with the Royal Canadian Air Force who had raised his family in a strict and authoritarian, if not necessarily abusive, manner. American critic Nick Schager noted that a recurring theme in The Ren & Stimpy Show during Kricfalusi's time as showrunner was his working out his rage over his upbringing by his authoritarian father in his native Canada, as many episodes featured overbearing patriarchal authority figures as the antagonists. Anthony's strict and overbearing father was based very closely on Kricfalusi's own father. During the day Raspanti came to visit Spümcø, all of the dialogue for "A Visit to Anthony" had been recorded except for Anthony's father. When Kricfalusi was fired from the series on September 21, 1992, this became a significant problem for production.

In a bid to revive ratings, which had gone into a sharp decline after Kricfalusi was sacked, the actor Randy Quaid provided the voice for Anthony's father. Kricfalusi criticized Quaid's voice acting, saying that it sounds like Quaid was "reading the dialogue for the first time, so he didn't give it the meaning that the drawings conveyed. Whoever directed him was afraid to actually give him any direction. And also he didn't know my dad". Kricfalusi insisted that only he could draw Anthony's father correctly and provide his voice properly. Kricfalusi had intended Anthony's father to sound like Michael Kricfalusi. Production would be completed at Games Animation, where drawing the character of Anthony's father was considered a task so difficult that only Bob Camp, Chris Reccardi and Kricfalusi's former protégé Michael Kim were allowed to draw that character. The budget for the episode spiraled out of control to $1 million U.S. dollars. Initially, the animation for the episode was assigned to Carbunkle Cartoons in Vancouver, but to save money it was sent to Rough Draft Korea at Seoul. It was reported that Bob Jaques of Carbunkle Cartoons had a "not so nice conversation with Jim Ballantine" over the broken promise, as the studio ended up working on "The Royal Canadian Kilted Yaksmen" instead. The network executive Will McRobb said of the scene in front of the fireplace where Ren and Stimpy quiver in fear as Anthony's father berates them that it was "genius if you're of the right age, but if you're eight, terrifying". The episode was finished in late 1992 – early 1993.

== Reception ==
The American journalist Thad Komorowski gave "A Visit to Anthony" three stars and a half out of four, writing: "Overlong at some points, this episode has the making of a classic".

== Books and articles ==
- Dobbs, G. Michael (2015). Escape – How Animation Broke into the Mainstream in the 1990s. Orlando: BearManor Media. ISBN 978-1593931100.
- Komorowski, Thad (2017). Sick Little Monkeys: The Unauthorized Ren & Stimpy Story. Albany, Georgia: BearManor Media. ISBN 978-1629331836.
