= The Royal Canadian Kilted Yaksmen =

- The Ren & Stimpy Show episode
- Episode no.: Season 2 Episode 13
- Directed by: John Kricfalusi; Chris Reccardi
- Story by: John Kricfalusi; Bob Camp; Jim Gomez; Vincent Waller
- Production code: RS5-7A
- Original air date: May 23, 1993

Episode chronology
← Previous "A Visit to Anthony"	Next → "To Salve and Salve Not!"

"The Royal Canadian Kilted Yaksmen" is the nineteenth episode and season finale of the second season of The Ren & Stimpy Show. It originally aired on Nickelodeon in the United States on May 23, 1993, and is the final episode to be aired with input from Spümcø.

== Plot ==
Ren and Stimpy's skeletons tower under the urban wasteland they had helped found.

Ren and Stimpy are members of the Royal Canadian Kilted Yaksmen in 1856, a satire of the 1874 March West of the Northwest Mounted Police. Its motto is "We always get our butts kicked!" Jasper, a character from "Big House Blues", serves as their superior. Ren is unenthusiastic but Stimpy is committed to the ideal future they strive for; they get the job after Stimpy bribes Jasper with 5 dollars from Ren. The rest of the recruits hide behind the women and are thus allowed to stay in "shame" (they do not care), while Ren slaps Stimpy for his stupidity.

The duo are sent out on a pointless mission riding their ungainly yaks to find land for people to settle, in a climate with complete disregard for the actual geography of Canada. They trek month by month, during which Ren gets sick that he requires medicinal leech treatment and get shot with arrows by First Nations. They are attacked by the world's smallest primate, the Kodiak marmoset; get help from a nearby settlement; and are struck by lightning.

The duo trek into a jungle, where they are stung by mosquitoes; Ren tries to drink from their water bottle, only to find that it had been populated by bees, who sting his tongue. They trek into a barren wasteland, where Ren finally decides to give up. To cheer him up, Stimpy sings the "Kilted Yaksmen Anthem", which despite its depressing lyrics lifts Ren's spirits.

The duo trek into a desert. Stimpy is still singing the anthem, which drives one of the yaks mad but has his sanity restored by Ren's slap. Facing starvation, Ren devises the idea of eating dirt, which hypothetically provides enough nourishment to keep them alive. Ren proceeds to waste actual food to detect dirt while Stimpy greedily eats the dirt himself, much to Ren's chagrin. The other yak decides to give up and sleep, only to accidentally hit a dirt vein; the outpour of dirt proves to be a blessing.

The group have a dirt feast, but not before Ren says grace. The yaks, Ren and Stimpy plant a flag to claim the wilderness for Canada, salute the flag and then die from malnourishment due to the dirt "meal" they had eaten. The area they had claimed is now a bustling and polluted metropolitan city with severe traffic congestion; the people had preserved the duo's skeletons at their original spot while the yaks do not get any credit.

== Cast ==
- Bob Camp (singing voice) as Ren
- Billy West as Ren, Stimpy, and Yak
- Harris Peet as Jasper
- Gary Owens as Powdered Toast Man
- Cheryl Chase as the children, mother

== Production ==
Series creator John Kricfalusi had wanted to do a story set in his native Canada, which was the origin of "The Royal Canadian Kilted Yaksmen". The March West is a famous episode in Canadian history, depicted in Canada as an epic of endurance and courage as the Northwest Mounted Police marched across the Prairie provinces to reach what is now Alberta. Production started on the episode that became "The Royal Canadian Kilted Yaksmen" in the spring of 1992. Chris Reccardi of Spümcø was assigned to direct the episode, but had only reached the layout stage when he was fired by Kricfalusi in late July 1992. Michael Fontanelli was then assigned to direct the episode, but little was accomplished between July–September 1992. On September 21, 1992, Kricfalusi was fired as the showrunner and Spümcø lost the contract for The Ren & Stimpy Show.

Nickelodeon assigned the newly founded Games Animation to take over the work of finishing the episodes that Spümcø had started. Reccardi, who joined Games Animation in October 1992, was assigned to once again direct the episode. Reccardi later said: "I was still learning and just never took charge of that thing. Back when I was storyboarding it, I really didn't get the feel of a story for it and John was really preoccupied with other challenges at the time." After the draft was completed, much of the drawings for the episode was done at Carbunkle Cartoons in Vancouver. Bob Jaques, director of Carbunkle Cartoons, complained that "Yaksmen" had no real plot, being a collection of comic incidents loosely built around the story of Ren and Stimpy's pointless quest to find the Great Barren Wasteland. The episode was finally finished in the spring of 1993, a year after it had been started. The Los Angeles Gay Men's Choir provided the chorus for the "Kilted Yaksmen Anthem". The line in the Kilted Yaksmen Anthem that says "And we will probably go to hell" was censored by Nickelodeon, which felt that lyric was too dark for children, but the word is still visible on the subtitles displayed due to humorously shoddy censorship.

On May 18, 1993, Kricfalusi's lawyer sent a letter to Nickelodeon threatening a lawsuit because the directing credits for "The Royal Canadian Kilted Yaksmen" were co-credited to Kricfalusi and Reccardi. In his letter, Kricfalusi's lawyer wrote that Reccardi had not directed the episode and did not deserve that credit. Jim Ballantine stated that the letter and the legal threats were due to jealousy as Reccardi was dating Lynne Naylor, who was the former girlfriend of Kricfalusi; Kricfalusi had earlier fired Reccardi for this mere act, despite the fact he was going to stay with Spümcø, resulting in him being hired at Games Animation to complete work on the series. Ballantine stated: "Since Chris was in a serious relationship with Lynne Naylor, anything having to do with Chris made John extra nuts. Our response was something like, there was no specific prohibition against adding a name and John had shared credits in the past. I certainly don't fault anything Chris did. He finished that cartoon, and we (me, Vanessa [Coffey] and Mary [Harrington]) thought he deserved the credit". Reccardi would not join Games Animation full time, choosing to work on select episodes in the later three seasons.

== Reception ==
American journalist Thad Komorowski gave the episode four and a half out of five stars, considering it to be one of the best, if not the best episode in the series. American critic Paulie Von Doom wrote that "Yaksmen" story had a weak plot, but a number of gross-out gags that made it amusing. He wrote: "The brilliance also lies with the animation: it borders on crude, but is entirely necessary for the mood of the cartoon. While some might consider it lazy by today's standards, anything more sleek and sophisticated would have cheapened the show." The American critic Bill Gibron wrote that "The Royal Canadian Kilted Yaksmen" "...featured a fabulous song (sung to the tune of 'My Country, 'Tis of Thee') that really propels the action/adventure plotline over the top." Gibron complained about the rather inconsistent way that censorship was applied, as "Man's Best Friend" was banned from airing on Nickelodeon for violence while an intestine passing out feces in this episode was not censored in any way, which he felt to be more vulgar than anything in the entire episode of "Man's Best Friend".

== Books and articles ==
- Dobbs, G. Michael (2015). Escape – How Animation Broke into the Mainstream in the 1990s. Orlando: BearManor Media. ISBN 978-1593931100.
- Komorowski, Thad (2017). Sick Little Monkeys: The Unauthorized Ren & Stimpy Story. Albany, Georgia: BearManor Media. ISBN 978-1629331836.
