= Ol' Blue Nose =

- The Ren & Stimpy Show episode
- Episode no.: Season 5 Episode 1
- Directed by: Steve Loter
- Written by: Ron Hauge; Bob Camp; Billy West
- Original air date: March 18, 1995

Episode chronology
← Previous "Travelogue"	Next → "Stupid Sidekick Union"

"Ol' Blue Nose" is the first episode of the fifth season of The Ren & Stimpy Show. It originally aired on Nickelodeon in the United States on March 18, 1995. Initially produced for the fourth season, it is the first episode to be released in an artificial fifth season "commissioned" by Nickelodeon.

== Plot ==
Ren and Stimpy are at a bus stop. Ren tries to sleep while Stimpy watches pay-per-view television. When Stimpy's quota runs out, he finds a coin in his nose and uses it to continue watching. It is his final coin, angering Ren as Stimpy had used up all their money. Suddenly, Stimpy is prompted to sing by his nose; he suddenly acquires the ability to sing in the manner of Frank Sinatra, attracting a crowd who pays him more than enough to recoup their costs.

Ren helps Stimpy launch his career, giving him the stage name "Snotra". they do not profit from it until they arrive at Las Vegas. Stimpy also performs in a prison where he manages to amaze even the most cynical prisoners; one prisoner is stabbed to death as a gift to him. Stimpy has become snobbish and ungrateful towards Ren in the same manner Ren had treated him, while Ren takes all the money and feigns care. Stimpy is invited by Louie Lungbubble, a celebrity whose television series is idolized by Stimpy, to be on his show. The duo are overjoyed.

At the dressing room, Stimpy is annoyed by Ren not bringing all his unnecessary things, only to discover Ren hoarding money; they get into a heated argument which causes Ren's nose to fall off; it had gained sentience and was the one singing the entire time; he quits due to Ren's persistent abuse. Stimpy is forced to get upstage with a pickled cucumber as his nose, being booed by the audience due to his abysmal performance. The nose gets the contract, but is nevertheless also booed by the audience, as he could not vocalize properly without Stimpy's mouth. He returns to the duo's trailer park, which had fallen into disrepair, and returns to being Stimpy's nose. Ren and Stimpy sing in joy, having learnt their lessons and ending the episode.

== Cast ==
- Billy West as Ren, Stimpy, and Stimpy's nose
- Brian Mendelsohn as Ren (one line only)

== Production ==
Unusual for the series, Billy West, an outsider contracted for voice acting, contributed to writing, due to the show's theme of showbiz resonating with his career; it is his only contribution to the series outside of voice acting, which he is widely known for. Mark O'Hare, a director on Rocko's Modern Life, and future storyboard artist for such shows as SpongeBob SquarePants, Camp Lazlo, and Chowder, produced storyboards for the episode as his only work on the series. Composer Shawn Patterson, who would later provide music for Adult Swim's Robot Chicken and would later co-write the song "Everything is Awesome" (with Tegan and Sara and The Lonely Island) for The Lego Movie, provided songs and lyrics for this episode, such as "Come Fry an Egg", all of which have parodied Frank Sinatra. Sound supervisor Brian Mendelsohn provided Ren's voice to replace a line Nickelodeon wanted changed during post-production, filling in for Billy West while he was in New York.

== Reception ==
American journalist Thad Komorowski gave the episode three and a half out of five stars.

== Books and articles ==
- Dobbs, G. Michael (2015). Escape – How Animation Broke into the Mainstream in the 1990s. Orlando: BearManor Media. ISBN 978-1593931100.
- Komorowski, Thad (2017). Sick Little Monkeys: The Unauthorized Ren & Stimpy Story. Albany, Georgia: BearManor Media. ISBN 978-1629331836.
