= Ren and Stimpy (characters) =

Fictional cartoon characters

- The Ren & Stimpy Show characters
- Ren (left) with Stimpy (right)
- First appearance: "Big House Blues" (The Ren & Stimpy Show) (1990)
- Created by: John Kricfalusi
- Designed by: John Kricfalusi; Lynne Naylor
- Voiced by: Ren: Pierre DeCelles (laughter and screams in "Big House Blues"); John Kricfalusi (1990–1993, 2003); Billy West (1993–present); Brian Mendelsohn (one line in "Ol' Blue Nose"); Bob Camp (additional lines, singing voice in "In the Army" and "The Royal Canadian Kilted Yaksmen"); Chris Edgerly (2011); Stimpy: Billy West (1990–present); Eric Bauza (2003, 2011)

In-universe information
- Full name: Ren Höek; Stimpson J. Cat
- Aliases: Ren: Marland Höek; Commander Höek; Three-Fingered Höek; Mad Dog Höek; Robin Höek; Renwaldo; The Unlucky Beast; Champy; Abraham; Stimpy: Stimpy; Dr. Stupid; Cadet Stimpy; Nurse Stimpy; Killer Kadoogan; Stupid the Kid; Stimpleton; Rex; Leviticus; Stimpy J. Kadoogan; Shampoo Master
- Species: Dog (Chihuahua) (Ren); Cat (Manx cat) (Stimpy)
- Gender: Male
- Family: Svën Höek (Ren's cousin); Oldman Farmer Höek (Ren's grandfather); Bubba Höek (Ren's nephew); Mrs. Höek (Ren's mother); Reverend Höek (Ren's father)
- Children: Stinky (Stimpy's son); Little Ricky (Ren and Stimpy's son)
- Origin: Hollywood, Yugoslavia
- Nationality: Yugoslavian

Ren Höek and Stimpson J. "Stimpy" Cat are the titular characters of the Nickelodeon animated series The Ren & Stimpy Show and its 2003 spin-off Ren & Stimpy "Adult Party Cartoon". Series creator John Kricfalusi created the characters during his stay at Sheridan College and they first appeared on film in the pilot episode "Big House Blues". Ren is a scrawny, emotionally unstable and psychotic "Asthma Hound" Chihuahua and his best friend Stimpy is a dim-witted, but good-natured Manx cat. The series portrays their wacky, bizarre and often surreal misadventures.

== Characters ==
=== Ren Höek ===
Ren Höek is a scrawny anthropomorphized "asthma-hound" chihuahua. Martin "Dr. Toon" Goodman of Animation World Magazine described Ren as scrawny, dyspeptic and violently psychotic, who loses his mind occasionally in a cumulative process resulting in his becoming, in Goodman's words, a "screaming klaxon, neon-pink eyes dilating into twin novae inches above his jagged, monolithic teeth." Andy Meisler of The New York Times described Ren as "adventurous", "intelligent", and "emotionally brittle". He, alongside Stimpy, hail from the fictional neighborhood of Hollywood, Yugoslavia; the usually unnamed place of residence is alluded to in "Mad Dog Höek" and "A Visit to Anthony". Episodes that feature George Liquor prominently sees them reside in the United States, while other settings may appear depending on the episodes.

Ren has a fairly lengthy and murid-like pink tail. However, in the first two seasons, Ren's tail constantly disappeared and was once even docked by George Liquor in the season 2 episode "Dog Show", while getting Ren and Stimpy both ready for an upcoming dog show (even though Stimpy is a cat), although it continued to appear afterwards in the episode, as well as episodes afterwards. This was because during production of "Big House Blues", John had to animate the toilet scene leading to the "Big Sleep" freakout; as he tried to mix limited animation with smooth tidbits and wanted Ren to move sloppily, his tail was a pain to animate – later on he swore to not animate a tail again. After season 2, Ren's tail had a rare form of continuity throughout the series, not even appearing at all in most episodes. Ren had an ambition to develop huge pectoral muscles, which he never achieved but successfully imitated in the season 3 episode "Ren's Pecs". A running gag involves Stimpy being confused with and treated like a dog, due to his unusual appearance not resembling a cat.

Kricfalusi originally voiced Ren in a manner that he describes as "a bad imitation of Peter Lorre". Billy West said that he auditioned to play Ren; the creators of the series believed that having West—who was also voicing the titular character of fellow Nicktoon Doug at the time—voice both Ren and Stimpy would give him too large of a workload. West voiced Ren after Nickelodeon fired Kricfalusi; Kricfalusi returned for the TNN episodes and unaired episodes of The Ren & Stimpy Show. Additional lines for Ren were done by sound editor Brian Mendelsohn and Bob Camp, who also did Ren's singing voice in the episodes "In the Army" and "The Royal Canadian Kilted Yaksmen". Chris Edgerly voiced the character in the game Nicktoons MLB. In the pilot episode, Pierre DeCelles provided Ren's signature diabolical laughter and screams, while West performed Ren's laugh in the series. His catchphrase is "You eediot!", and he also uses variations of "What is your problem, you sick little monkey?", which is similar to a quote by Lorre in The Maltese Falcon: "You... you imbecile. You bloated idiot. You stupid fat-head, you."

Kricfalusi complained about Nickelodeon executives requesting that Ren have "a softer side". Bill Wray said that Ren was his favorite character to write for; Wray described Ren as "fun" because "you can make him mean." In 1993 he added that "It drives me crazy when I tell people I work on the show and they always say, 'Make Ren meaner.'"

=== Stimpy ===
Stimpson J. "Stimpy" Cat is a three-year-old, anthropomorphic, mildly overweight and red and white-furred Manx cat. He has a blue bulbous nose, purple eyelids, is tailless, four-fingered paws concealed with fingernail-tipped gloves, humanoid buttocks and flat feet that have a quartet of wiggly toes on each one and a peanut-sized brain. He is portrayed as intelligent enough in some episodes to be a chef or a scientist and sometimes as nonsensically unintelligent. Martin "Dr. Toon" Goodman of Animation World Magazine described Stimpy as "obese" and "brain-damaged." Andy Meisler of The New York Times described Stimpy as "bosom", "barrel-chested" and "good-natured". He hails from the neighborhood of Hollywood, Yugoslavia alongside Ren.

Stimpy's trademark facial expression is a blissfully ignorant smile with his tongue hanging out. When he gets excited, he says his catchphrase, "Oh, Joy!", or simply "Jooooooy". Stimpy is named after an art school classmate of Kricfalusi, animator Harold Duckett, whose nickname was "Stimpy Cadogen" ("Killer Cadoogen" was Stimpy's pseudonym in several episodes and in a few others he is referred to as Stimpleton Cadogen). West said that he based Stimpy's voice on an "amped up" Larry Fine of the Three Stooges. West described Stimpy as one of his favorite characters. Stimpy was inspired by Kricfalusi's former girlfriend and the series' co-developer, Canadian animator Lynne Naylor.

Stimpy likes to create destructive electronic devices whenever he has the required intelligence for it. Andy Meisler of The New York Times says he feels a fixation for "sensory pleasures of fresh kitty litter".

Wray described Stimpy as his favorite character to draw. Wray said that Stimpy does not have "a huge range of emotion."

West declined to voice Stimpy in the Ren & Stimpy "Adult Party Cartoon" because he believed that the series was not funny and that voicing Stimpy in it would damage his career. Consequently, Eric Bauza instead voiced the character and reprised the voice role in the video game Nicktoons MLB. West will reprise his roles as both Stimpy and Ren in Comedy Central's unreleased revival of the series.

== History ==
In a 1993 interview by a comics magazine, Bill Wray stated that he believes that Kricfalusi created Ren and Stimpy around 1978 for Kricfalusi and his friends' personal amusement in college; Kricfalusi attended Sheridan College in Canada, where he was unsatisfied with the education. Wray said that he had initially "forgotten about" the characters. When Nickelodeon requested a new series, Kricfalusi assembled a presentation called "Your Gang", similar to a children's show with a live action host presenting various cartoons. Each cartoon parodied a genre, and Ren & Stimpy parodied the "cat and dog" genre. Vanessa Coffey, the producer of the show, said that she did not like the general idea, but that she liked the characters.

Kricfalusi originally created Ren and Stimpy as the pets of George Liquor and Jimmy the Idiot Boy.

Kricfalusi received inspiration for Ren from a black and white photograph of a chihuahua in a sweater next to a woman's feet. The original photograph is called "New York City, 1946" and was taken by Elliott Erwitt. He received inspiration for Stimpy's design by a Tweety Bird cartoon called A Gruesome Twosome where the cats in the animation had big noses. The relationship of both Ren and Stimpy was inspired in the relationship of Gandy Goose and Sourpuss from Terrytoons.

Kricfalusi's ex-girlfriend, Lynne Naylor, had a key role in simplifying Ren and Stimpy's designs from "Big House Blues" so that they could be easier to animate. Kricfalusi, however, expressed preference toward the previous designs, and considered Naylor's simplified versions to be a degradation of quality.

== Sexuality ==
From its start, there were hints at the characters' sexuality. During the Spümcø years of the show on Nickelodeon, a running gag would have Ren and Stimpy engaging in something intimate (such as Stimpy bathing Ren during the episode "Nurse Stimpy"), with Stimpy assuring Ren that "no one will know" about the private and rather embarrassing encounter, only to pan towards a window in the room and showing several characters (including Mr. Horse) witnessing the event. The episode "Svën Höek" shows Stimpy having a romantic affair with Ren's cousin Svën, including an intimate "private" moment in Stimpy's litterbox and scrawling "Svën + Stimpy" all over the walls. This was dropped after Spümcø was fired from the show.

Kricfalusi discussed the sexuality of the characters in a January 28, 1997 interview with the San Francisco Examiner, confirming their sexuality, saying: "Totally. In Ren's case, it's not completely by choice. He'd rather have a beautiful human woman if he could get away with it. Since he can't, Stimpy's easy. Stimpy's madly in love with Ren."

Jeffery P. Dennis said in the journal article "The Same Thing We Do Every Night: Signifying Same-Sex Desire in Television Cartoons" that Ren and Stimpy are within a world where "gay identities cannot exist", so the series portrays same-sex romantic desire as "anomalous and perverse". Dennis added that the critics of the series "made much" of the gay connotations of Ren and Stimpy, such as their sharing of a house and bed, their reminiscing of a wedding, and Stimpy's "giving birth" to flatulence. Dennis said that Ren is "socially and sexually" the aggressor in the relationship; in addition he says that some episodes portray Stimpy as "a stereotypical 1950s wife" who cleans, cooks food, and irons Ren's underwear. Dennis stated that the aspects "may adhere to a reading of a sexual relationship." Dennis concludes that the relationship between Ren and Stimpy is a parody of heterosexual relationships rather than an actual gay or an actual romantic relationship. Dennis adds that in other situations Ren and Stimpy are "read more appropriately" as coworkers, enemies, friends, and house pets. Dennis argues that Yogi Bear and Boo-Boo are more consistently gay than Ren and Stimpy. Dennis also stated that the scenes of Ren and Stimpy as a couple emulate a heterosexual couple instead of being a union between two men.

In a response to Dennis' statements, Martin Goodman of Animation World Network said that Kricfalusi had outed Ren and Stimpy as gay and adds that while the Ren & Stimpy "Adult Party Cartoon" had not yet been released and therefore Ren and Stimpy had not been explicitly portrayed as gay, Ren and Stimpy would qualify as a consistently gay couple since they share a bed, live as partners, discuss a planned wedding, and had a "child", despite the child being flatulence and Ren having no part in his creation.
