= List of Duckman episodes =

Duckman: Private Dick/Family Man, commonly known as Duckman, is an American adult animated sitcom created by Everett Peck for the USA Network. It follows Eric Tiberius Duckman, a private detective duck, his sidekick Cornfed, and Duckman's family life as a single father. The series ran from March 5, 1994, to September 6, 1997, for 70 episodes. The series is based on characters created by Peck in a comic book published by Dark Horse Comics in 1990. It was produced in association with Paramount Network Television and animated by Klasky Csupo, who concurrently were also working on Nickelodeon productions such as Aaahh!!! Real Monsters and Rugrats.

Throughout its four-season run, Duckman was met with critical acclaim. IGN ranked Duckman as 48th in its 2009 list of "Top 100 Best Animated TV Shows". The episodes "T.V. or Not to Be", "Noir Gang", and "Haunted Society Plumbers" were nominated for a Primetime Emmy Award for Outstanding Animated Program in 1994, 1996, and 1997, respectively.

== Series overview ==
Season	Episodes	Originally released	
Season	Episodes	First released	Last released
1	13	March 5, 1994	June 11, 1994
2	9	March 11, 1995	May 8, 1995
3	20	January 6, 1996	July 6, 1996
4	28	January 4, 1997	September 6, 1997

== Episodes ==
=== Season 1 (1994) ===
No. overall	No. in season	Title	Directed by	Written by	Original release date	Prod. code
1	1	"I, Duckman"	Marv Newland (uncredited)	Jeff Reno & Ron Osborn	March 5, 1994	4001
Feeling underappreciated by his family, Duckman hunts down the man mailing him bombs thinking he's the only one who cares. Note: "I, Duckman" was dedicated to Frank Zappa, who died three months before the episode's airing.
2	2	"T.V. or Not to Be"	Raymie Muzquiz	Bernie Keating	March 12, 1994	4002
Duckman is hired by a televangelist to find a missing painting and has a near-death experience after being captured and suffocated with cellophane.
3	3	"Gripes of Wrath"	Norton Virgien	Michael Markowitz	March 19, 1994	4003
Duckman takes his children to the unveiling of a supercomputer named Loretta. However, during the unveiling, Loretta overhears a comment Duckman makes and alters reality to make everything go Duckman's way... for a while.
4	4	"Psyche"	Paul Demeyer	Jeffrey Astrof & Mike Sikowitz	March 26, 1994	4004
Feeling insecure about himself, Duckman gets plastic surgery for his bill. Not long after, two buxom blondes hire him and Cornfed to investigate why they only attract men who only want them for their bodies, causing Duckman to have a crisis of conscience.
5	5	"Gland of Opportunity"	John Eng	Ron Lux & Eugene Stein	April 9, 1994	4005
After an accident at an amusement park, the cowardly Duckman has the adrenal gland of a daredevil transplanted into his body, giving him a new outlook on life.
6	6	"Ride the High School"	Raymie Muzquiz	Michael Markowitz	April 16, 1994	4006
Ajax is offered a scholarship to an exclusive boarding school, which Duckman sends him to, unaware that the scholarship is part of a plan by his arch-nemesis King Chicken.
7	7	"A Civil War"	Norton Virgien	Bob Kushell	April 23, 1994	4007
Duckman gets jealous when his family showers Cornfed with attention, so he fires him during their next case: a death investigation for an insurance company.
8	8	"Not So Easy Riders"	Paul Demeyer	Joe Ansolabehere & Steve Viksten	April 30, 1994	4008
To escape paying years of Duckman's back taxes he and Cornfed flee on motorcycles.
9	9	"It's the Thing of the Principal"	Igor Kovalyov	Story by : Ron Lux & Eugene Stein; Teleplay by : Ron Lux	May 7, 1994	4009
Ajax and his vice-principal fall in love and elope, leaving Bernice and Duckman to track them down, posing as a married couple themselves.
10	10	"Cellar Beware"	Norton Virgien	Ladd Graham	May 21, 1994	4010
A home security expert gets Duckman to buy an elaborate security system – the "Interlopen Führer 2000" – which first fails to prevent a burglary, then locks the whole family in the basement.
11	11	"American Dicks"	John Eng	Jeffrey Astrof & Mike Sikowitz	May 28, 1994	4011
An episode of the reality show American Dicks films a day in the life of Duckman (chosen as the only agency not affected by a nationwide detective union's strike) as he and Cornfed try to find the mayor after he's been kidnapped.
12	12	"About Face"	Raymie Muzquiz	Jim Pond & Bill Fuller	June 4, 1994	4012
Duckman dates an ugly woman whose voice he fell in love with when calling 911. People's reactions, however, prompt her to seek a full makeover, making her gorgeous to everyone.
13	13	"Joking the Chicken"	Jeff McGrath	Jeffrey Astrof, Mike Sikowitz & Michael Markowitz	June 11, 1994	4013
A group of rude stand-up comics hire Duckman to stop Iggy Catalpa, a clean, mild-mannered, politically correct comedian whose bland, inoffensive brand of comedy becomes a sensation, thanks to his agent – King Chicken.

=== Season 2 (1995) ===
No. overall	No. in season	Title	Directed by	Written by	Original release date	Prod. code
14	1	"Papa Oom M.O.W. M.O.W."	Norton Virgien	Michael Markowitz	March 11, 1995	4215
Duckman becomes a national hero after saving the President from an assassination attempt, until it's revealed that his "heroics" were an accident and he was merely trying to grope two women. Nonetheless he capitalizes on his newfound fame, penning a film for USA and planning a run for the Senate.
15	2	"Married Alive"	Raymie Muzquiz	Bernie Keating	March 18, 1995	4214
Bernice returns home from a European vacation and announces that she is marrying a self-made billionaire who plans to take her, Grandma-ma and the kids away with him to Switzerland, leaving Duckman alone.
16	3	"Days of Whining and Neurosis"	John Eng	Gary Glasberg	March 25, 1995	4216
Duckman and Cornfed go undercover at an exclusive celebrity-filled health and rehab spa to investigate the murder of a doctor. While there, Duckman detoxes from his various addictions.
17	4	"Inherit the Judgement: The Dope's Trial"	Jeff McGrath	Michael Markowitz	April 3, 1995	4217
In search of a free clock radio, Duckman takes the family across five states through the desert. On their trek they wind up in the small town of Coopville, where everyone is related, King Chicken is the sheriff and Duckman is put on trial for heresy.
18	5	"America the Beautiful"	Paul Demeyer	Bill Canterbury & Gene Laufenberg	April 10, 1995	4218
In an episode "full of heavy-handed and over-obvious allegory" (according to the beginning disclaimer), a multi-ethnic group of children hire Duckman and Cornfed to find their idol, a gorgeous model named America. The investigation involves speaking to four of her ex-boyfriends, men who represent American life in the 1950s, 1960s, 1970s and 1980s, while Duckman falls deeper in love with the idea of her. Guest stars: Alan Young as Wilbur Nelson, June Lockhart as Mrs. Nelson, Bobcat Goldthwait as Cinque and Homeless Man, Jim Belushi as Saul Monella and a police officer, and Heather Locklear as America
19	6	"The Germ Turns"	Bob Hathcock	Jim Pond & Bill Fuller	April 17, 1995	4219
At a New Age fair, Duckman gets a visit from his dead mother (voiced by Katey Sagal) – reincarnated as a highly infectious germ because of how terrible of a mother she was. Hoping to escape the same fate, Duckman begins smothering his sons with affection, much to their chagrin.
20	7	"In the Nam of the Father"	Norton Virgien	Jeff Astrof & Mike Sikowitz	April 24, 1995	4220
The son Cornfed never knew he had arrives at the office and Cornfed travels back to Vietnam to find the mother and the truth. Duckman takes his family along on the trip for a much needed vacation and must also deal with the flashbacks he is experiencing.
21	8	"Research and Destroy"	John Eng	Story by : Jeff Astrof & Mike Sikowitz; Teleplay by : Jay Moriarty	May 1, 1995	4221
When Ajax shows a natural talent for poetry, Duckman gets him to sign a contract for a greeting card company in search of a new writer.
22	9	"Clip Job"	Jeff McGrath	David Misch	May 8, 1995	4222
Henry Melfly (voiced by Ben Stiller) kidnaps Duckman, blaming him for the decline in moral, family-friendly shows, resulting in a clip show as he argues his point.

=== Season 3 (1996) ===
No. overall	No. in season	Title	Directed by	Written by	Original release date	Prod. code
23	1	"Noir Gang"	Raymie Muzquiz	Eva Almos & Ed Scharlach	January 6, 1996	4224
In a black-and-white, film noir-style episode, Cornfed and Duckman fall for the same woman (femme fatale client Tamara LaBoinque, voiced by Bebe Neuwirth), raising conflicting feelings in Cornfed.
24	2	"Forbidden Fruit"	Paul Demeyer	Jeff Astrof & Mike Sikowitz	January 13, 1996	4223
The family hires a French live-in tutor (King Chicken in disguise) to help the children with their study skills and social development, who sues Duckman for sexual harassment after he gives her an apple, which, according to Judeo-Christian ideology, is considered sexual as the apple is the forbidden fruit Eve ate and tempted Adam with. Ostracized by the public, Duckman is forced to hide out with Fluffy and Uranus while a feminist group begins forcing pro-female political correctness on the town.
25	3	"Grandma-ma's Flatulent Adventure"	Norton Virgien	Bill Canterbury & Gene Laufenberg	January 20, 1996	4225
When the family fears they can no longer care for Grandma-ma, they decide to place her in a retirement home. Unfortunately, Duckman loses her while dropping her off, sending her on a wild adventure, which ultimately seems to kill her.
26	4	"Color of Naught"	John Eng	Michael Markowitz	January 27, 1996	4226
Tony Sterling (self-made millionaire and entrepreneur) and his assistant/supermodel Angela (the 911 operator from "About Face") begins advertising "Beautex", a beautifying cream to the city and its denizens. In truth, however, Sterling is King Chicken and Beautex (which doesn't work on Duckman) is a virus which eventually devolves everything it touches.
27	5	"Sperms of Endearment"	Jeff McGrath	Bill Canterbury & Gene Laufenberg	February 10, 1996	4327
After caring for a small girl (that calls her "mom") in the park, Bernice decides it's time to have children of her own. Her hunt for a father doesn't go well, however, so she settles on artificial insemination – with sperm that turns out to be from Duckman.
28	6	"A Room with a Bellevue"	Peter Avanzino	Joshua Sternin & Jennifer Ventimilia	February 17, 1996	4328
After an incredibly bad day, Duckman simply wants to make it to Charles and Mambo's birthday dinner, but gets pushed too far by a dry cleaner. His ranting in the street over the inconveniences in life caused by the uncaring ways of society (without wearing a starched collar) gets him arrested and committed to a state mental hospital for thirty days, where he settles into the routine and decides to stay, forcing Cornfed to break him out.
29	7	"Apocalypse Not"	Raymie Muzquiz	Bill Canterbury, Gene Laufenberg, Michael Markowitz & David Misch	February 24, 1996	4329
While everyone in the city goes underground for a disaster preparedness drill, an oblivious Duckman thinks he's the last man alive and wreaks havoc – until he finds a beautiful, deaf gymnast and falls for her. The trapped city folk, meanwhile, begin to turn on each other during their attempted escape back to the surface.
30	8	"Clear and Presidente Danger"	John Eng	Doug Chamberlin & Chris Webb	March 2, 1996	4330
Duckman scams a vacation to a South American country, where a passionate Duckman rant about pay toilets leads to a people's revolution and has him installed as dictator. After his first hundred days he's just as corrupt a leader as the government he replaced, and it's up to Cornfed to lead another revolution to bring him down.
31	9	"The Girls of Route Canal"	Donovan Cook & Raymie Muzquiz	Brian Kahn	March 9, 1996	4331
Charles and Mambo ask Duckman to tell them how he won over their mother to help build their confidence in approaching their dreamgirls. The story he tells turns out to be a spoof of The Bridges of Madison County.
32	10	"The Mallardian Candidate"	Peter Shin	David Misch	March 16, 1996	4332
Iggy Catalpa hires Duckman to investigate a conspiracy: every time he does his laundry he loses one sock. However, the case is actually a ruse to kidnap Duckman and turn him on Cornfed by Catalpa's World Domination League.
33	11	"Pig Amok"	Jeff McGrath	Spencer Green	April 6, 1996	4333
Because of a previously unknown genetic problem, Cornfed has 24 hours to lose his virginity or he will die. After he fails to connect with multiple women (thanks to Duckman's sleazy pick-up lines), Bernice has sex with him to save his life, but Cornfed thinks Bernice is in love with him.
34	12	"The Once and Future Duck"	Peter Avanzino	Dean Batali & Rob Des Hotel	April 13, 1996	4334
Ajax accidentally opens a rift in the time/space continuum with his clock radio, bringing various future versions of Duckman to the past to see him, all different depending on different decisions he can make, causing him to fall into a paranoid spiral.
35	13	"The One with Lisa Kudrow in a Small Role" "Planet of the Dopes"	Raymie Muzquiz	Monica Piper	April 20, 1996	4335
Feeling unappreciated by his family, Ajax leaves the house for a walk and is abducted by two redneck aliens from the planet Betamax. On Betamax, Ajax is treated like a genius and worshiped as a deity, while on Earth, Duckman realizes he knows nothing about his son – or any of his family.
36	14	"Aged Heat"	John Eng	Bill Canterbury & Gene Laufenberg	April 27, 1996	4336
After his family mocks his detective skills, they refuse to take Duckman seriously when he accuses Grandma-ma of acting suspiciously, though she has, in fact, been replaced by Agnes DelRooney (voiced by Brian Doyle-Murray), a robber who looks just like her.
37	15	"They Craved Duckman's Brain!"	Donovan Cook	Michael Markowitz	May 4, 1996	4337
Duckman is cast in a hospital educational film. After being left in an active MRI chamber for hours, a mutant part of his brain grows an isotope that can cure cancer, which everyone wants. Note: Joe Walsh appears as himself.
38	16	"The Road to Dendron"	Peter Shin	Bill Canterbury, Gene Laufenberg, Michael Markowitz & David Misch	May 11, 1996	4338
In a parody of the Bing Crosby/Bob Hope "Road to..." films, Duckman and Cornfed chaperon Ajax's class trip to the Dendron in Sudan, where Ajax is kidnapped and held hostage by a sultan, his fakir and a beautiful princess.
39	17	"Exile in Guyville"	Jeff McGrath	Ellen L. Fogle	May 25, 1996	4339
In a distant future, a mother's (voiced by former Fridays cast member Maryedith Burrell) bed-time story for her son involves Duckman and Bernice leading a nationwide division of the sexes after Bernice lambastes Duckman for developing raunchy lingerie with no thought to what a real woman would want to wear.
40	18	"The Longest Weekend"	Raymie Muzquiz	David Misch	June 22, 1996	4341
Fed up with the shabby treatment of local government, Duckman and his North Phlegm neighbors form a block association to take on the nearby Dutch Elm Street block association (which has been lobbying the Mayor's office), eventually leading to all-out war.
41	19	"The Amazing Colossal Duckman"	John Eng	Bill Canterbury	June 29, 1996	4342
Duckman contracts a very rare blood condition through a unique combination of chemicals which causes his blood to literally boil and his body to grow several inches every time he gets angry. After exploiting his new stature for a while, he realizes he is unable to control himself and exiles himself to a secluded island.
42	20	"Cock Tales for Four"	Donovan Cook & Bob Hathcock	Doug Chamberlin & Chris Webb	July 6, 1996	4343
Duckman and Bernice attend a dinner party to meet Ajax's new girlfriend Tammy's parents, King Chicken and drunken wife Honey. Over the course of the evening their relationships change in unexpected ways.

=== Season 4 (1997) ===
No. overall	No. in season	Title	Directed by	Written by	Original release date	Prod. code
43	1	"Dammit, Hollywood"	Peter Shin	Michael Markowitz & Jeff Reno	January 4, 1997	4449
After seeing a bad movie, Duckman sneaks into the studio head's office to get his $7 back. The studio head, however, makes him an executive to sabotage the studio.
44	2	"Coolio Runnings"	Jeff McGrath	Bill Canterbury, Gene Laufenberg & David Misch	January 11, 1997	4446
Duckman adopts rap star Coolio (voicing himself) as his son to compete in the local father/son games over Ajax, hurting Ajax's feelings.
45	3	"Aged Heat 2: Women in Heat"	Peter Avanzino	Eva Almos & Ed Scharlach	January 18, 1997	4440
Duckman is arrested for killing Fluffy and Uranus again, and accidentally sent to a woman's prison. There he becomes the star attraction of an illegal dance ring, until another girl arrives and bumps him from his slot.
46	4	"All About Elliott"	Peter Shin	Gene Laufenberg	January 25, 1997	4445
Duckman and Cornfed hire the college-aged Elliott (voiced by Chris Elliott) to be their office intern. Immediately he warms himself to Duckman by feeding his destructive side and pushing Cornfed away by sabotaging his personal life and commitments.
47	5	"From Brad to Worse"	Peter Avanzino	Michael Markowitz	February 1, 1997	4447
Duckman is reunited with a man he made homeless 20 years ago and decides to try to help him get back on his feet.
48	6	"Bonfire of the Panties"	Anthony Bell	Michael Markowitz	February 8, 1997	4448
Cornfed, Charles and Mambo create an aphrodisiac to revive Duckman's waning love life. When he forgets to wear it, Courtney Thorne-Smith (voicing herself) falls for him, but the family isn't sure what to believe.
49	7	"Role with It"	Anthony Bell	Michael Markowitz	February 15, 1997	4450
Duckman, his family and staff vacation together at an Indian casino, during which they're approached by a psychiatrist who offers them treatment involving roleplaying to prevent them from what she sees as inevitable violent self-destruction and uncovers real issues among them. Note 1: Steven Weber appears in a live-action Wings sequence. Note 2: "Role with It" is the last episode to feature Dana Hill as Charles. The episode was produced around April or May of 1996 at the time Hill's health started to decline in the spring of 1996 where she started having mood swings and began taking anti-depressant medication. It actually means that before she slipped into a diabetic coma in late May of that year, Hill did her last recording of Charles' voice when the episode was produced, as her voice was lower due to her health.
50	8	"Ajax & Ajaxer"	Peter Avanzino	Bill Canterbury	February 22, 1997	4451
While investigating a laboratory, Cornfed accidentally ingests a "Get Dumb" potion, which lowers his IQ to the point that he becomes best friends with Ajax, who is feeling left out of his family again. Note 1: "Ajax & Ajaxer" is the first episode to feature Pat Musick as Charles. Note 2: The episode is dedicated to Dana Hill (voice of Charles), who died on July 15, 1996.
51	9	"With Friends Like These"	Steve Loter	Gene Laufenberg	March 1, 1997	4452
After convincing himself again that he's having a surprise party only to come home to just Cornfed, Duckman realizes he has no friends. Vowing to use his clean slate and try again to be the "best friend possible" he stumbles upon a group of culturally diverse, laugh-tracked, 20-year-olds at a coffee shop who immediately take a shine to him.
52	10	"A Trophied Duck"	Jeff McGrath	Bill Canterbury	March 8, 1997	4453
Duckman drags the family to Dickcon '97 in San Francisco to see him get an award. Unbeknownst to him, he's actually being set up by Lauren Simone, a rival from his days at "Don Galloway's Famous Detective School".
53	11	"A Star Is Abhorred"	Jaime Diaz	Gene Laufenberg	March 15, 1997	4454
During a night out, Bernice becomes an angry female music star after yelling at Duckman for insulting her singing at a karaoke bar. Her life begins to go downhill, however, when she and the family go on tour and she gets sucked into the rock & roll life style. Note: Part one of two.
54	12	"Bev Takes a Holiday"	Stig Bergquist & Toni Vian	Gene Laufenberg, Michael Markowitz & David Misch	March 22, 1997	4455
Continuing from "A Star Is Abhorred", Bernice travels to Washington, D.C. to assume her new role as Congresswoman. Meanwhile, Beverly – long-lost triplet of Beatrice and Bernice – hires a detective to find her family and seeks them out. Duckman spots her spying on him and, mistaking her for Beatrice, runs to her, only to be struck by a bus. In the hospital, Bev must pretend to be Beatrice for Duckman's sake when he wakes and mistakes her for same.
55	13	"Love! Anger! Kvetching!" "Ain't Gonna Be No Mo No Mo"	Anthony Bell	Michael Markowitz	April 12, 1997	4456
On the night of a big poker game Duckman has planned with Joe Walsh, Bob Guccionne and others, his Uncle Mo arrives and claims to be dying from heart cancer. Note: Joe Walsh "performs" a modified version of his song "Life's Been Good" to close the show.
56	14	"Haunted Society Plumbers"	Peter Avanzino	Gene Laufenberg, Michael Markowitz & David Misch	April 19, 1997	4457
In an episode with hints of Marx Brothers, Three Stooges and Martin and Lewis classics, Duckman and Cornfed – temporarily plumbers – are hired as at a high-society party celebrating the unveiling of a "cursed" jewel: the "Sharon Stone". Before the ceremony, though, the stone goes missing. Note: "Haunted Society Plumbers" was nominated for an Emmy Award. Homer Simpson makes an appearance at the end.
57	15	"Ebony, Baby"	Steve Loter	Gene Grillo	April 26, 1997	4458
As Cornfed goes on vacation (his first in 11 years), Duckman works as the sidekick to a black female private investigator, Ebony Sable (voiced by Tisha Campbell), who gets him involved in a world of murder, power, lust and blaxploitation clichés.
58	16	"Vuuck, as in Duck"	Jeff McGrath	Brett Baer & David Finkel	May 3, 1997	4460
Duckman inherits a AAA baseball team as the last-minute action of owner Gene Vuuck (who overhears him bemoaning the current status of the game and decides he's a "real fan"), who is trying to keep the team out of the hands of a banker. Unfortunately, the team has no following and is losing money rapidly, so he replaces the whole team with supermodels.
59	17	"Crime, Punishment, War, Peace, and the Idiot"	Jaime Diaz	Howard Margulies	May 10, 1997	4459
Beverly asks Bernice if she knows anything about Grandma-ma's life, prompting Grandma-ma to begin a series of flashbacks of her life, with the main cast filling in for past friends, acquaintances and lovers.
60	18	"Kidney, Popsicle, and Nuts"	Stig Bergquist	David Silverman & Steve Sustarsic	May 24, 1997	4461
Duckman is in need of a kidney transplant from a blood relative, but the children are out for various reasons (Ajax doesn't have any, Charles and Mambo share one) so he turns to his cryogenically frozen father whom, it turns out, wasn't his father at all. He tracks down his real father (voiced by Brian Keith), a paranoiac in the sticks with his "own country", and while he's staying with him a standoff with the government develops.
61	19	"The Tami Show"	Anthony Bell	Eva Almos & Ed Scharlach	June 14, 1997	4461
Duckman backs his car into Tami, a cute girl who claims her family died in a sleighing accident leaving her on her own. The family invites her to stay with them and she quickly begins incapacitating Bev and taking over the family.
62	20	"My Feral Lady"	Peter Avanzino	Story by : Reid Harrison & Dan Gerson; Teleplay by : Dan Gerson	June 21, 1997	4462
A depressed Duckman purchases a mail-order bride, but upon delivery finds her to be a feral jungle savage. With Cornfed's help, Duckman attempts to turn her (Kathy Lee) into a proper lady he can marry. Note: Leeza Gibbons appears in an extended live-action Leeza sequence.
63	21	"Westward, No!"	Steve Loter	Jed Spingarn	June 28, 1997	4463
While the boys are visiting Bernice in D.C., Cornfed invites Beverly to a catfish ranch in Louisiana owned by his aunt Jane (voiced by Estelle Getty), and a jealous Duckman tags along. After getting the ranch hands fired, Duckman and the gang must help the foreman, Big Jack McBastard (voiced by Jim Cummings), drive the 2,000 head of catfish to Texas.
64	22	"Short, Plush and Deadly"	Jeff McGrath & Steve Ressel	Lisa Latham	July 12, 1997	4464
During a taxpayer-financed dream vacation, Duckman, Cornfed, Fluffy and Uranus are kicked out of camp, stung by bees and lost. The bee stings paralyze Cornfed and cause his head to swell, but turn Fluffy and Uranus into large, homicidal monsters. It's up to Bernice and Beverly to find and save them.
65	23	"How to Suck in Business Without Really Trying"	Jaime Diaz	Ellis Weiner	July 19, 1997	4465
Duckman sells his last name to the VarieCom corporation for $1,000, which he immediately wastes, leaving him penniless and jobless.
66	24	"You've Come a Wrong Way, Baby"	Stig Bergqvist	Gene Laufenberg & Howard Margulies	July 26, 1997	4466
After catching Mambo with a cigarette in his mouth, Bernice challenges the tobacco industry on the floor of Congress. During testimony she's invited to a tobacco plantation by Walt Evergreen (voiced by Jim Varney), president of an unnamed tobacco company, which doesn't go well for the family. Note: "You've Come a Wrong Way, Baby" carries a tag dedicating it to Joe Camel.
67	25	"Hamlet 2: This Time It's Personal"	Anthony Bell	David Misch	August 2, 1997	4467
Duckman sees the ghost of his Uncle Mo, who says that Duckman's father was murdered by King Chicken and Duckman should take revenge. To do so he decides to act crazy to get King Chicken – with whom he has formed a truce to allow King Chicken time around Bernice – to admit his guilt so he can kill him with impunity. Cornfed realizes that Duckman is living out the plot of Hamlet, which will eventually lead to his death.
68	26	"Das Sub" "Class Warfare"	Peter Avanzino	Gene Grillo & Michael Markowitz	August 16, 1997	4468
Convicted of fraud, Duckman is sentenced to 5,000 hours of community service, but accidentally finds himself substituting for a teacher he injures and teaching a group of intellectual high schoolers how to be "street-smart".
69	27	"Where No Duckman Has Gone Before"	Steve Loter	Gene Laufenberg	August 23, 1997	4469
A Star Trek parody where Captain Duckman (as Captain Kirk) does battle against King Khan Chicken in an episode similar to "Arena" among others. Note: Leonard Nimoy cameos in the episode.
70	28	"Four Weddings Inconceivable"	Steve Ressel	Michael Markowitz	September 6, 1997	4470
At the wedding of Dr. Stein, a series of emotional epiphanies lead to an amazing set of marriage proposals: King Chicken proposes to Bernice; Cornfed proposes to Beverly; Duckman proposes to Honey, King Chicken's ex. After arguments between the principles, Duckman volunteers to make the arrangements for the triple wedding, purposely putting any blame on himself. Despite his arrangements, the ceremony goes off without a hitch – until Duckman's supposedly deceased wife, Beatrice, returns. Note: While "Four Weddings Inconceivable" is the series finale of Duckman, it ends on an unresolved cliffhanger.
