= Pilot (Sit Down, Shut Up) =

- Sit Down, Shut Up episode
- Acting principal Sue Sezno informs Larry Littlejunk that a teacher has to be fired.
- Episode no.: Season 1 Episode 1
- Directed by: Dwayne Carey-Hill
- Written by: Mitchell Hurwitz
- Production code: SIT-101
- Original air date: April 19, 2009

Guest appearance
- Maria Bamford

Episode chronology
← Previous —	Next → "Miracle's Are Real"

The pilot episode of the American animated television series Sit Down, Shut Up originally aired in the United States on April 19, 2009 on the Fox network. The episode introduced the faculty and staff at Knob Haven High School in the fictional town of Knob Haven, Florida. In the episode, the school is facing a financial crisis and acting principal Sue Sezno has to either fire a teacher or make sure the school wins a football game. Meanwhile, assistant principal Stuart Proszakian becomes addicted to drugs that were found in a student's locker.

The episode was written by series creator Mitchell Hurwitz and directed by Dwayne Carey-Hill. The first draft was written by Hurwitz in 2000, before he pitched Arrested Development. Hurwitz based Sit Down, Shut Up on the Australian sitcom of the same name. After he had rewritten the script several times, the series was picked up by Fox. The episode received generally mixed reviews from critics. According to the Nielsen ratings, it was watched by 5.21 million households in its original airing.

== Plot ==
Acting Principal of Knob Haven High School Sue Sezno finds a case of pills in a student's locker. Believing them to be drugs, she hands them over to science teacher Miracle Grohe to study. Miracle, however, tells her the pills may be steroids; Sue decides to test them on her new assistant Principal, Stuart Proszakian. With the assistance of P.E. teacher Larry Littlejunk, she manages to successfully trick Stuart into taking the pills, telling him that they are vitamins.

Meanwhile, Sue informs the staff that the school is in financial trouble, and the only way to raise money is to gain alumni donations from the upcoming football game or face firing a teacher. German teacher Willard Deutschebog informs English teacher Ennis Hofftard that a student may have caught him buying "filthies" (porn) at a newsstand that morning; because of this, Willard fears that if Sue hears, he may be the one getting fired. At the same time, Larry attempts to ask Miracle out on a date, but finds he cannot stand Miracle's "stupid" thoughts. As it turns out, she was the one responsible for his students' poor training in gym: she repeatedly throws out food, in honor of those in third-world countries.

At the game, bisexual drama teacher Andrew LeGustambos attempts to grab the attention of both Larry and Miracle, but the whole school stands in shock as Stuart arrives with two full and augmented breasts; the pills he had taken were actually librarian Helen Klench's female hormone replacements. Nonetheless, the school loses the game. Sue finally reveals she was not planning on actually firing any teacher on her watch. Helen arrives to inform them that they did not need to win the game after all; she had found a rare time capsule with treasures. Upon opening the time capsule, it is revealed that it is full of Willard's porn magazines that Ennis hid. Sue pitifully looks at Willard and tells him he is fired.

== Production ==
The pilot episode of Sit Down, Shut Up was written by series creator Mitchell Hurwitz and directed by Dwayne Carey-Hill. It was originally written by Hurwitz in 2000, but he "kept it in a drawer for a long time" and brought it out when he needed money. The idea for the series was based on the Australian situation comedy of the same name. He pitched his adaption to different networks that were interested in the concept, but they turned it down, because the characters were "way too broad and way too self-centered and oblivious," and they told him that he had to rewrite it. The Fox network picked it up in April 2008 under the name Class Dismissed, later changed to Sit Down, Shut Up. Hurwitz's adaption was originally planned to be live-action like its counterpart, but he decided to make it an animated series to "avoid some work". He chose to use real images as backgrounds after he saw Mo Willems' Knuffle Bunny in a book store. He then contacted Willems to design the characters for Sit Down, Shut Up. The images for the school were taken at a school next door to the Rough Draft Studios, the series' animation studio. Production of the series halted in June 2008, when the writers found out that they would be under the jurisdiction of the IATSE Animation Guild, instead of Writers Guild of America (WGA). A month later, the writers and the production company, Sony Pictures, reached an agreement saying that the writers would still be covered by the IATSE, but their contract would be the same as the WGA's in certain areas. This made Sit Down, Shut Up the only primetime animated series on Fox not to be covered by the WGA. During this process, head writer Bill Oakley left the series.

Cast members Jason Bateman, Will Arnett and Henry Winkler, who also starred on Hurwitz's show Arrested Development, voice Larry Littlejunk, Ennis Hofftard and Willard Deutschebog, respectively. Will Forte voices Stuart Proszakian, who was also featured in the Australian series. Kristin Chenoweth stars as Miracle Grohe. The part was originally given to Maria Bamford, but she was later replaced with Chenoweth. The executives still allowed Bamford to do some "side voices" on the show, including in this episode. Cheri Oteri was picked as the voice of Helen Klench, a "totally unresourceful" librarian, and Nick Kroll was picked as the voice of Andrew LeGustambos, the drama teacher whose surname translates "he likes both", referring to his bisexuality. Regina King was replaced with Kenan Thompson, who took over the role as Sue Sezno, the acting principal. Tom Kenny voices Muhannad Sabeeh "Happy" Fa'ach Nuabar, the secretive custodian.

== Reception ==
Despite airing after The Simpsons and before Family Guy, the episode was watched by 5.21 million viewers in its original airing in the United States on April 19, 2009. The episode acquired a 2.3 rating in the 18–49 demographic, finishing third in its timeslot after Amazing Race and a rerun of Extreme Makeover: Home Edition. It finished first in its timeslot in the 18–34 demographic, where it acquired a 2.7 rating.

The episode received generally mixed reviews from critics. Brian Lowry of Variety said: "Despite a pedigree that includes Arrested Development creator Mitch Hurwitz and many of that program's stars, Sit Down seldom rises above sniggering double entendre." Genevieve Koski of The A.V. Club graded the episode B, saying: "I'm staying optimistic that the characters are going to get fleshed out in upcoming episodes, because this is obviously going to be a character-based ensemble comedy." Jonah Krakow of IGN was more positive about the episode, noting the "familiar aspects" of Arrested Development, such as the "deft wordplay, biting sarcasm and inappropriate humor". He concluded, saying: "As long as the talented cast can continue to play to their strengths and the scripts can humorously tackle dicey subject matter, this should continue to be a very entertaining show." Kona Gallagher of TV Squad watched the episode twice, and said that it "definitely grows on you." She concluded, saying: "In all, I think the first time you watch Sit Down, Shut Up, it's really easy to blow it off as another animated show that's trying too hard. However, it's actually worth sticking around and watching a couple of episodes."
