= Miracle's Are Real =

- Sit Down, Shut Up episode
- Larry attempts to make Miracle believe in rational scientific approaches.
- Episode no.: Season 1 Episode 2
- Directed by: Raymie Muzquiz
- Written by: Mitchell Hurwitz; Jim Vallely
- Production code: SIT-102
- Original air date: April 26, 2009

Episode chronology
← Previous "Pilot"	Next → "World's Greatest Teacher"

"Miracle's Are Real" is the second episode of the American animated television series Sit Down, Shut Up. It was originally broadcast on April 26, 2009, in the United States on the Fox network. In the episode, Miracle Grohe loses her faith in spirituality because of Larry's pragmatism. Meanwhile, Acting Principal Sue Sezno holds a school fair to raise money for the staff's insurance.

The episode was co-written by the series creator Mitchell Hurwitz and Jim Vallely and directed by Raymie Muzquiz. It received generally mixed reviews from critics. According to the Nielsen ratings, it was watched by 4.20 million households in its original broadcast.

== Plot ==
Miracle celebrates the first day of spring by giving out flowers, but fails to realize that she is actually giving out hemlock, which ultimately puts Andrew in a coma. Because the staff's insurance does not cover "voluntary self-poisoning", Acting Principal Sue Sezno suggests they hold a school fair to raise money, advertising it as a "fair fair". Miracle tells Larry that tonight is the night her prophecy will come true. Larry challenges her spiritually-based life style by spending the night at the commune waiting for Miracle's birth star to align with Pluto. When the stars finally align, Larry is too busy trying to disprove Miracle's way of life that he does not notice that she is trying to kiss him. She runs away and throws away her fortune. Larry reads it and finds out that when Miracle's star is align with Pluto, she would receive a kiss from the greatest love of her life.

At the fair, Miracle feels depressed and gives Ennis her baby Merch to babysit. The booth Miracle got her fortune from is delivered by a mysterious man and Larry plans on using to make Miracle believe in spirituality again. Meanwhile, Sue does the raffle for the German coffee maker, which she wins herself. Ennis admits that he lost Merch, which upsets Miracle. Outraged, Ennis takes a crystal ball and throws it at the ball toss, at which Sue falls into the tub of water. Andrew and Helen then notice a magnet in Sue's skirt, which indicates that Sue cheated for the coffee maker. Ennis gets some prizes in a booth, including Merch clinging onto a Pluto doll, and Miracle sees that her prophecy has come true and thanks Ennis with a hug. She says that it is still a magical world no matter what Larry says.

== Production ==
"Miracle's Are Real" was co-written by the creator Mitchell Hurwitz and Jim Vallely and directed by Raymie Muzquiz. It was the second episode to be produced. The first episode had to be rewritten several times before the series was picked up by Fox. The series was picked up in May 2008, but production was halted only a month later due to a contract dispute between the writers and the production company, Sony Pictures. In July 2008, a compromise was reached and the writers returned to work. On April 17, 2009, TV Squad posted an early look on various elements in the series, including the content in "Miracle's Are Real". The article's writer noted that Jason Bateman and Will Arnett's characters interacted a lot more than in the pilot episode. The writer recalled it as "Michael/Gob magic", referring to Bateman and Arnett's characters on Hurwitz's previous series, Arrested Development.

== Reception ==
In its original broadcast on April 26, 2009, "Miracle's Are Real" was watched by 4.20 million households, according to the Nielsen ratings, earning a 1.9 rating/5 share among viewers aged between 18 and 49, and a 2.1 rating/7 share among viewers between 18 and 34. The episode dropped in almost one million viewers from the pilot episode. "Miracle's Are Real" finished third in its timeslot in the 18-49 demographic, after Amazing Race and Extreme Makeover: Home Edition.

The episode received mixed reviews from television sources and critics. Kona Gallaghar of TV Squad, who liked the pilot episode more the second time, was not as impressed with "Miracle's Are Real". She concluded, "The main problem I have right now with Sit Down, Shut Up, is that even that simple plot-point is too deep for it. Maybe I'm expecting too much from an animated series, but is it wrong to want the characters to feel at least as real as their backgrounds?". Jonah Krakow of IGN gave the episode 7.3 out of 10 saying that "there's still plenty to like about this show even if this wasn't the strongest episode [..] I'm not worried about Sit Down, Shut Up's ability to create some classic television episodes because there's way too much talent involved. Steve Heisler of The A.V. Club graded the episode a C saying that "the major problem with this show is that there isn't a central character [...] Even Larry, the straight man of the bunch, plays second fiddle to the ambiguous sexual talk of Andrew, and the pathetic ball of sweat that is Willard. I need something, anything, to ground these shenanigans, of which there are many, many, many."
