= The Great Outdoors (The Ren & Stimpy Show) =

- The Ren & Stimpy Show episode
- Episode no.: Season 2 Episode 15
- Directed by: Vincent Waller; Ken Bruce
- Story by: John Kricfalusi; Vincent Waller
- Production code: RS5-13B
- Original air date: March 27, 1993

Episode chronology
← Previous "Fake Dad"	Next → "The Cat That Laid the Golden Hairball"

"The Great Outdoors" is the fifteenth episode of the second season of The Ren & Stimpy Show. It originally aired on Nickelodeon in the United States on March 27, 1993.

== Plot ==
Ren and Stimpy go camping; Stimpy is enthusiastic while Ren is annoyed as usual. Ren is hungry, so Stimpy offers dehydrated food pills, which Ren is disgusted by; he eats the meat pill despite Stimpy's objections, causing Mr. Horse to immediately appear inside Ren.

Stimpy decides to go skinnydipping, revealing that his fur is actually removable; after quelling Ren's concerns about privacy, Ren removes his "fur" (which has almost no change on his appearance) and obliges. The duo find the skinnydipping experience fun, only for park ranger Old Man Hunger to interrupt, for he likes skinnydipping; they are disturbed by his presence, finally compelled to leave when he invites his mother, Mrs. Buttloaves, to join.

Stimpy goes off to pick berries, while Ren decides to stay behind to light a fire. Not knowing where to find twigs, he decides to use squirrels instead; despite the abuse, the squirrels stay calm and munch on food. He uses gasoline as a shortcut, only to light himself on fire; Old Man Hunger saves his life by stepping on him, extinguishing the fire and pouring water on him while stirring, for he likes skinnystomping. Refusing to admit his mistake, a charred Ren punches a confused Stimpy, who completed his task without any problems.

Ren and Stimpy watch the stars, appreciating their beauty before sleeping. Ren is awoken by a strange sensation, only to find a mosquito sucking his blood; he kills it and goes to sleep. However, a swarm of mosquitoes decide to feast on him in revenge, only satiated after Ren's blood had been drank almost completely.

Ren is thirsty and decides to drink water from the lake, only to be stopped by Stimpy, as it is contaminated by pathogens that cause Beaver Fever; Stimpy had prepared a water dispenser, which Ren drinks from, but they do not realize a beaver had sneaked into it. Ren gradually turns into a beaver as a result of this, much to his anger, after which he slaps Stimpy with his tail; Old Man Hunger emerges and follows suit, having contracted it from the contaminated water, for he loves skinnyslapping.

== Cast ==
- Ren – voice of Billy West
- Stimpy – voice of Billy West
- Old Man Hunger – voice of Billy West
- Fat Lady – voice of John Kricfalusi

== Production ==
The episode started development at Spümcø in 1992, being planned by prominent writer Vincent Waller; it features similarities to "The Wilderness Adventure", an episode that was rejected for the first season and never produced. The production was delayed, and the layout stage was done at Rough Draft Korea in Seoul as a cost-saving measure. Vincent Waller was in Seoul supervising the layout stage for "The Great Outdoors" when series creator John Kricfalusi was fired from the series' production on September 21, 1992, being notified late by a horrified Gregg Vanzo. He would decline to return to the series at Games Animation; his return in 1999 would ironically led to his career as a showrunner and important cast member on SpongeBob SquarePants years later. Ken Bruce of Games Animation was sent out to finish what Waller had left behind. Billy West voices Ren in this episode as voice acting had not been done before Kricfalusi's firing. Peter Avanzino serves as a storyboard artist for the episode.

== Reception ==
American journalist Thad Komorowski gave the episode three-and-a-half out of five stars; he wrote that the episode was merely a string of crude gags, not helped by the fact that Old Man Hunger was associated with "In the Hall of the Mountain King", signaling pederasty, worsening the already unpleasant tone of the episode.

== Books ==
- Dobbs, G. Michael (2015). Escape – How Animation Broke into the Mainstream in the 1990s. Orlando: BearManor Media. ISBN 978-1593931100.
- Komorowski, Thad (2017). Sick Little Monkeys: The Unauthorized Ren & Stimpy Story. Albany, Georgia: BearManor Media. ISBN 978-1629331836.
