= Duckman: The Graphic Adventures of a Private Dick =

1997 video game

- Developer: Illusions Gaming Company
- Publisher: Playmates Interactive
- Producers: Matthew Seymour, Carlos Rodriguez
- Designer: Darren Bartlett
- Programmers: James Coliz; Bill Fowler; Mitch Bechtel; Chuck Woo; Maria Leveriza
- Writer: Fred Schiller
- Composers: Tommy Tallarico; Todd Denni; John Lawrence; Bill Hendrickson
- Platform: Microsoft Windows
- Release: NA: May 31, 1997
- Genre: Graphic adventure game
- Mode: Single-player

Duckman: The Graphic Adventures of a Private Dick is a point-and-click adventure video game developed by the Illusions Gaming Company and published by Playmates Interactive based on the American television series Duckman by Everett Peck, based on characters he created in his 1990 one-shot comic book published by Dark Horse Comics. In the game, Duckman has been usurped by a similar-looking impersonator, whom the real Duckman must expose.

== Gameplay ==
The gameplay is that of a standard point and click adventure. Duckman can interact with and use collected items on various characters and objects. There are two ways to interact with a person: a normal way and an angry way. Being based on the popular animated sitcom, the game is filled with black humor. The game contains about thirty locations.

== Plot ==
Private detective Duckman becomes a celebrity and is about to star in his own TV show. Now, he lives his life with pleasure, abandoning his family, only to be one day removed and replaced by a new Duckman, a more muscular and superhero-like version. Duckman is about to commit suicide, having been rejected by his family; however, his friend, Cornfed, asks him to return his place under the sun and take down the new Duckman. After a series of humorous adventures, Duckman gains access to the studio where the show is filming. There, he confronts his impersonator, who is revealed to be a robot, and is then destroyed. The game culminates with Duckman opposing the one behind the whole impersonator plot, his arch-enemy King Chicken.

== Development ==
Duckman was one of two major animation franchises adapted by developer The Illusions Gaming Company into a video game, the other being Beavis and Butt-Head in Virtual Stupidity. Developed under the working title Duckman: The Legend of the Fall, art for the game included the drawing of 10,000 hand-rendered frames across 80 scenes in 40 locations. Creative director Darren Bartlett stated capturing the humour of the show was important to the design of the game, with the development team meeting with the writers of the show to script the game's plot and "off-beat, non-sequitur" dialogue. The cast of the television show reprised their roles for the game, with the exception of Jason Alexander as Duckman; producer Matt Seymour stated Alexander turned down the appearance as the performance of the character "hurt his voice", and the game had a larger number of lines. Playmates Interactive showcased the game at E3 1996. A version for the PlayStation was originally planned for early 1997.

== Reception ==
Reception

Review scores
Publication	Score
Adventure Gamers	3/5
PC PowerPlay	73%

Mark Ward of Game Rant considered Duckman "captured the essence" of the television show due to its meta premise and making "no compromises in its dark comedy".
