= Squirrel Boy =

American animated television series

- Genre: Animated comedy
- Created by: Everett Peck
- Directed by: Peter Avanzino (pilot); Raymie Muzquiz
- Voices of: Richard Steven Horvitz; Pamela Adlon; Carlos Alazraqui; Kurtwood Smith; Nancy Sullivan; Billy West; Jason Spisak; Tom Kenny; Monica Lee Gradischek; Eliza Schneider; Mona Marshall
- Composers: Brad Benedict; Mark Fontana; Erik Godal
- Country of origin: United States
- Original language: English
- No. of seasons: 2
- No. of episodes: 26 (52 segments)

Production
- Executive producers: Brian A. Miller; Everett Peck
- Producer: Pernelle Hayes
- Running time: 22 minutes (2 11-minute segments)
- Production company: Cartoon Network Studios

Original release
- Network: Cartoon Network
- Release: May 29, 2006 – September 27, 2007

Squirrel Boy is an American animated television series created by Everett Peck for Cartoon Network. Prior to the series, Peck was known for creating Duckman, which aired on USA Network from 1994 to 1997. The series premiered on May 29, 2006 and ended on September 27, 2007, with a total of 52 eleven-minute episode segments. A series of six shorts was released in 2008 from January 11 to April 10, and aired between commercial breaks as part of the Cartoon Network Extra mini-series.

== Overview ==
Rodney (left) and Andy (right).

Squirrel Boy centers on the lives of the titular anthropomorphic squirrel named Rodney (Richard Steven Horvitz), who is full of crazy ideas and get-rich-quick schemes, and his best friend and owner, a boy named Andy Johnson (Pamela Adlon). In the family are Robert (Kurtwood Smith), Andy's pessimistic and unlucky father who utterly dislikes Rodney, and Lucille (Nancy Sullivan), Andy's cheery and mild-tempered mother.

Andy and Rodney are arch-enemies with a rowdy boy named Kyle Finkster (Billy West) and his own anthropomorphic parrot, Salty Mike (Carlos Alazraqui), who are neighborhood bullies and constantly pick on Andy and Rodney. Other characters in the show include Oscar (Jason Spisak), Andy's nerdy human friend with overprotective parents, Leon (Tom Kenny), a stray, blue squirrel who is Rodney's friend and lives in a tree in the Johnsons' backyard, Darlene (Monica Lee Gradischek), a yellow, stray squirrel who is Rodney's love interest, Martha (Eliza Schneider), a nerdy human child prodigy who lives across the street and is Andy's love interest, and Esther Flatbottom (Mona Marshall), a cranky old lady who rides a motorized cart.

== Episodes ==
=== Series overview ===
Season	Episodes	Originally released	
Season	Episodes	First released	Last released
Pilot		Unaired	
1	13	May 29, 2006	November 17, 2006
2	13	February 2, 2007	September 27, 2007
Shorts	6	January 11, 2008	April 10, 2008

=== Unaired pilot (2004) ===
Title	Directed by	Written by	Original release date
"Kite Makes Right"	Peter Avanzino	Christopher Painter	Unaired
Note: This pilot was produced in 2004.

=== Season 1 (2006) ===
No. overall	No. in season	Title	Written by	Storyboarded by	Original release date
1a	1a	"A Line in the Sandwich"	Christopher Painter	Raymie Muzquiz	May 29, 2006
Andy and Rodney make sandwiches to raise money and buy a special ball known as a "Fobject" (a portmanteau of "fun" and "object"), but argue over whether Rodney's hat is increasing profits, or Andy's secret sauce.
1b	1b	"Tree for Two"	Joe Purdy	Stig Bergqvist	May 29, 2006
After Andy's toy rocket ends up on top of the tallest tree in the park, Rodney must climb up the tree and retrieve it.
2a	2a	"Scout's Dishonor"	Christopher Painter	Toni Vian	July 14, 2006
While Andy is scouting with the Badger Scouts, he and Rodney meet their rivals, Kyle Finkster and his parrot, Salty Mike.
2b	2b	"Andy Had a Little Squirrel"	Howard Margulies	Ted Stearn	July 14, 2006
Andy attempts to teach Rodney tricks, followed with Rodney making unsuccessful attempts at doing so.
3a	3a	"The Big Haggle Hassle"	Christopher Painter	Tuck Tucker	July 21, 2006
Rodney spends Andy's money and must get a job to get back a ceramic angry clown figure for Mr. Johnson's collection.
3b	3b	"Rolling Blunder"	Mark Banker	Stephen Sandoval	July 21, 2006
Rodney and Mr. Johnson teach Andy melon-cart racing, but the two soon forget about practicing, and become obsessed with winning a race.
4a	4a	"Born to Be Mild"	Christopher Painter	Stig Bergqvist	July 28, 2006
Rodney must survive in the wild with the help of his fellow squirrel buddy, Leon, after the house explodes.
4b	4b	"Yer Out!"	Joe Purdy	Stephen Sandoval	July 28, 2006
When Rodney replaces Mr. Johnson's position as coach of a baseball team, Mr. J becomes the coach of a rival team, and Rodney puts Andy out of the team.
5a	5a	"Best of Best Friends"	Mark Banker	Toni Vian	August 4, 2006
After a fight, Andy and Rodney set up applications for new best friends.
5b	5b	"The Hairy Truth"	Mark Banker	Christo Stamboliev	August 4, 2006
Andy and Rodney participate in a pet-shampoo contest after Rodney creates a new hair tonic, ensuing in chaos afterwards.
6a	6a	"Up All Night"	Joe Purdy	Stig Bergqvist	August 11, 2006
Andy and Rodney want to stay up all night to watch a celestial event called the Yellow Flash.
6b	6b	"Pool for Love"	Christopher Painter	Ted Stearn	August 11, 2006
Andy tries to prevent Mr. Johnson from chopping down Leon's tree in order to build a swimming pool. Rodney helps alongside Andy, until a female squirrel named Darlene persuades Rodney to go swimming with him.
7a	7a	"Islands in the Street"	Christopher Painter	Christo Stamboliev	August 18, 2006
An accident leaves Rodney on a deserted island in the middle of the highway alongside Salty Mike.
7b	7b	"Speechless"	Joe Purdy	Ted Stearn	August 18, 2006
Mr. Johnson is going to present his speech with Scoutmaster Witherbones, a scoutmaster who inspired him when he was a Badger Scout. When he watches a comedy film the same night with Andy and Rodney, he laughs so hard that he loses his voice.
8a	8a	"What's Sung Is Sung"	Mark Banker	Toni Vian	September 8, 2006
Andy tries to bring Rodney and Mr. Johnson closer together through the art of karaoke.
8b	8b	"Wall of the Wild"	Howard Margulies	Stephen Sandoval	September 8, 2006
Rodney gets trapped within the walls of the house, and he has to find a way out. At the same time, Andy thinks Rodney has run away from home because he thought he had insulted Rodney.
9a	9a	"The Greatest Schmo on Earth"	Christopher Painter	Aldin Baroza and Stig Bergqvist	September 15, 2006
Rodney's flying squirrel cousin, Eddie, ruins his special time with Rodney's crush, Darlene.
9b	9b	"Outta Sight"	Joe Purdy	Christo Stamboliev	September 15, 2006
Andy goes blind after losing his glasses, but his other senses improve as a result. Rodney takes advantage of this, while Kyle adjusts to his new glasses.
10a	10a	"Harried Treasure"	Mark Banker	Ted Stearn	September 22, 2006
Rodney and Andy find a map to buried treasure, but together, they must team up with Kyle and Salty Mike to dig it up from Mr. Johnson's new lawn.
10b	10b	"The Rod Squad"	Joe Purdy	Stephen Sandoval	September 22, 2006
Leon and Darlene join Rodney's "Rod Squad" to suit up and prevent Andy from getting in trouble with Mrs. Johnson, at the same time trying to retrieve some stolen cinnamon buns, but they figure out that Rodney was the one who stole them.
11a	11a	"The Trojan Rabbit"	Gene Grillo	Raymie Muzquiz	November 3, 2006
Rodney runs away from home when Archie, the "perfect pet" rabbit, arrives for Andy, but Archie may not be the ideal pet Andy had in mind.
11b	11b	"The Endangered Species Twist"	Christopher Painter	Toni Vian	November 3, 2006
Rodney discovers that he is an endangered species, and forces the Johnsons to cater to his "every whim".
12a	12a	"Birthday Boy"	Christopher Painter	Stig Bergqvist	November 10, 2006
Rodney forgets Andy's birthday, so he rushes to make it right, when he should have planned ahead.
12b	12b	"Freaky Fur Day"	Howard Margulies	Christo Stamboliev	November 10, 2006
To prove whose life is easier, Andy and Rodney switch roles for a day.
13a	13a	"Hole in the Story"	Mark Banker	Stephen Sandoval and Michael Mullen	November 17, 2006
Grandpa Squirrel tells an ancestral, erratic space adventure story to help Andy and Rodney escape a dangerous dare.
13b	13b	"Screw-Up in Aisle Six"	Christopher Painter	Ted Stearn	November 17, 2006
Andy bloats up after Rodney persuades him into eating free samples of chicken nuggets at the grocery store after finding out they contain one of his allergies, cashews. Rodney has to roll him around to find the cure without Mr. Johnson finding out.

=== Season 2 (2007) ===
No. overall	No. in season	Title	Written by	Storyboarded by	Original release date
14a	1a	"Flatbottom's Up"	Howard Margulies	Ted Stearn	February 2, 2007
After getting blamed for destruction done by Kyle and Salty Mike to Mrs. Flatbottom's house, Andy and Rodney have to do chores around her home. When Andy and Rodney realize that Mrs. Flatbottom has lemonade as a reward, they work harder and harder, but Kyle and Salty Mike want the lemonade too.
14b	1b	"Family Crude"	Mark Banker	Christo Stamboliev	February 2, 2007
Andy and Rodney must get along with Kyle and Salty Mike for the weekend while Andy's parents are out of town.
15a	2a	"Eddie or Not..."	Christopher Painter	Aldin Baroza	February 9, 2007
Cousin Eddie returns, and tries to make amends with Rodney.
15b	2b	"Trouble Date"	Joe Purdy	Michael Mullen	February 9, 2007
Darlene is invited to a date with Rodney. Meanwhile, Andy and Martha spend time taking historical pictures of each other.
16a	3a	"Winner Fake All"	Christopher Painter	Stig Bergqvist	February 16, 2007
Andy gets tired of losing at a complicated game, until Rodney actually lets him win.
16b	3b	"Rodney Darling"	Joe Purdy	Toni Vian	February 16, 2007
When Rodney gets excluded from Mr. Johnson's 'Men's Club', he decides to join Mrs. Johnson's 'Ladies' Club'.
17a	4a	"Frag the Dog"	Christopher Painter	Stig Bergqvist	February 23, 2007
Rodney and Andy struggle to retrieve Mr. Johnson's bowling trophy from the neighbor's dog.
17b	4b	"The Grim Cheaper"	Mark Banker	Toni Vian	February 23, 2007
Mr. Johnson gets Andy hooked on saving while Rodney tries to persuade Andy into spending his last dollar.
18a	5a	"Treehouse Broken"	Joe Purdy	Michael Mullen	April 6, 2007
Things get a little out of hand when Andy and Rodney compete with Kyle and Salty Mike in a treehouse building competition.
18b	5b	"My Brand New Salty Mike"	Scott Malchus	Christo Stamboliev and Patrick Kochakji	April 6, 2007
Salty Mike is accidentally sold to Mrs. Naselpickel, making Kyle adopt Rodney as his new pet.
19a	6a	"Stranger Than Friction"	Howard Margulies	Aldin Baroza	April 13, 2007
Rodney gets jealous when Andy befriends Salty Mike and shares a hobby with him.
19b	6b	"Don't Cross Here"	Mark Banker	Dave Chlystek	April 13, 2007
Andy wants to be the town's new crossing guard, but faces major competition when Jacke Royal volunteers as well.
20a	7a	"More Flower to You"	Christopher Painter	Ted Stearn	August 16, 2007
When Rodney accidentally kills Mr. Johnson's flowers, he and Andy must find a way to revive the plants before the big flower show before Mr. Johnson finds out.
20b	7b	"News It or Lose It"	Joe Purdy	Stig Bergqvist and Michael Mullen	August 16, 2007
After they write several rumors about each other and put them in the newspaper, Andy, Rodney, and Mr. Johnson become embroidered in a newspaper crossfire.
21a	8a	"Get a Lifeboat"	Joe Purdy	Michael Mullen	August 23, 2007
Rodney and Mr. Johnson are stranded in a lifeboat together.
21b	8b	"Bully, for You"	Scott Malchus	Christo Stamboliev	August 23, 2007
A bully squirrel named Butch takes over Leon's tree and the Johnsons' house.
22a	9a	"Ice Cream Anti-Social"	Christopher Painter	Toni Vian and Patrick Kochakji	August 30, 2007
While Martha is cutting wood but does not tell what she is making, Andy and Rodney decide to stow away on an ice cream truck to find out.
22b	9b	"Dog & Phony Show"	Howard Margulies	Aldin Baroza	August 30, 2007
After getting annoyed with the barking dog, Andy and Rodney must find the solution and make it stop. Problems go by when Kyle and Salty Mike enter the house and attempt to pull off a prank, leading to major trouble.
23a	10a	"He Got Blame"	Adam Cohen	Max Martinez	September 24, 2007
Rodney goes into the blame-for-hire business, but encounters trouble while working with Kyle and Salty Mike.
23b	10b	"I Only Have Eye for You"	Christopher Painter	Ted Stearn	September 24, 2007
Puggo goes to the mall with Andy and Rodney after sneaking away from the set.
24a	11a	"Diss and Make Up"	Joe Purdy	Christo Stamboliev	September 25, 2007
Darlene inadvertently causes a rift between Andy and Rodney's friendship.
24b	11b	"Be Careful What You Fish For"	Christopher Painter	Stig Bergqvist and Ted Stearn	September 25, 2007
Andy tricks Rodney into being less selfish, but soon regrets it when Rodney has less time for him.
25a	12a	"Don't Pet on It"	Joe Purdy	Toni Vian and Tuck Tucker	September 26, 2007
Leon decides to become a pet and chooses Oscar as his owner and Rodney as his pet-mentor.
25b	12b	"Bunny and the Beak"	Christopher Painter	Max Martinez and Toni Vian	September 26, 2007
Archie returns to plan a prank on Rodney with a little help from Salty Mike.
26a	13a	"Gumfight at the S'Okay Corral"	Christopher Painter	Michael Mullen	September 27, 2007
Grandpa Squirrel tells Rodney a story about a mysterious 'gumfighter' who saves a Wild West town from a no-good sheriff.
26b	13b	"I, Stan, Corrected"	Howard Margulies	Michael Mullen, Christo Stamboliev, and Ted Stearn	September 27, 2007
Mistaken identities leave Leon hunted by an exterminator named Stan, and Stan hunted by the gang.

=== Shorts (2008) ===
No.	Title	Original release date
S01	"Breaking the Bank"	January 11, 2008
Andy and Rodney try their best to break open an impenetrable piggy bank.
S02	"In Arm's Way"	February 19, 2008
Rodney causes trouble for Mr. Johnson during his lunch with Badger Scoutmaster Dan.
S03	"See Food Breakfast"	March 3, 2008
In order to decide who gets the last doughnut, Andy and Rodney compete in a contest to see who will gross out Mr. Johnson enough to leave the room first.
S04	"Take Me to Your Feeder"	March 17, 2008
Rodney decides Mr. Johnson needs his help getting him into an exclusive birdwatching club.
S05	"Hanging Tough"	March 31, 2008
Things take a turn for the worse when Rodney comes home with a new poster to hang up in Andy's bedroom.
S06	"Bedside Matters"	April 10, 2008
Mr. Johnson is hung up in bed, and must get all the rest he can, but his nurse, who turns out to be Rodney, will not leave him alone.
