= Oscar Henry =

- Shortland Street character
- Portrayed by: Christopher Brown
- Duration: 1998–1999
- First appearance: 14 August 1998
- Last appearance: 7 June 1999
- Introduced by: Simon Bennett
In-universe information
- Occupation: Business manager

Oscar Henry is a fictional character on the New Zealand soap opera Shortland Street played by Christopher Brown from 1998 to 1999.

Oscar debuted in mid-1998 as a love interest for Minnie Crozier (Katrina Devine). He was at first liked by the clinic staff but he was soon revealed to be possessive and overpowering. When Minnie broke up with him, he blackmailed her and raped her. The character starred in a hugely high-profile storyline that saw him steal $1,000,000 from the clinic and end up in a coma after an attempt on his life. The storyline ended the 1998 season with a whodunit that led into 1999 with the revelation that Mackenzie Choat (Ingrid Park) was the assailant. The character then participated in a dramatic conclusion that saw his coma revealed as fake and Mackenzie finally end his life by exploding the clinic.

The character, his rape storyline and his death were popular. Oscar proved empowering to the characterisation of Minnie and furthered the character's long-running track record of bad love interests.

== Storylines ==
Oscar arrived to the clinic as a replacement for the departed Jenny Harrison (Maggie Harper). He started to date Minnie Crozier (Katrina Devine) but clashed with both Fergus Kearney (Paul Ellis) and Mackenzie Choat (Ingrid Park). Oscar started to control Minnie's lifestyle choices and appearance, leading her to decide to break up with him. Oscar was infuriated and blackmailed her with nude pictures they had taken together. Mackenzie helped Minnie break up with him and a furious Oscar forced himself into Minnie's house and raped her. He framed Mackenzie for theft and had her fired, before he embezzled $1,000,000 from the clinic with the intention of running away. However, Minnie discovered Oscar unconscious after being bludgeoned in her mother, Ellen's (Robyn Malcolm) living room. Oscar remained in a coma and suspicion fell on many, mainly Minnie, Fergus and Mackenzie. Lionel Skeggins (John Leigh) discovered it was Mackenzie who had attempted to murder Oscar for his cash and she soon speculated that Oscar was faking his coma. When Mackenzie confronted Oscar about the false coma, he attacked her only for Mackenzie to knock him out and set his hospital room on fire. He died instantly in the explosion.

== Character development ==
Although Oscar appeared competent and efficient, the staff at the clinic soon started to realise Oscar had a controlling streak that often undermined his social behaviour. This overpowering undertone soon became hugely clear to his girlfriend - Minnie Crozier, when he started to force her to dress and act as he pleased. When she questioned him, he raped her and was revealed to the clinic as little more than a thief and a fraud when he embezzled a million dollars from the clinic. His horrid personality and antagonistic nature, ensured Oscar didn't manage to escape, being bludgeoned by an unknown assailant. However, due to his personality, many characters were suspects.

== Reception ==
Oscar has been named as one of the soap's best villains. His death is also remembered as an iconic episode. His rape of Minnie contributed to the character's high topicality and long run of unfortunate romances. Paul Ellis (Fergus Kearney), particularly enjoyed working with Brown and found the characters storyline interesting and unique. Former producer Simon Bennett listed the rivalry between Oscar and Mackenzie as one of his favourite storylines throughout his run on the soap.
