= Sit Down, Shut Up (2009 TV series) =

American adaptation of Australian TV series

- Genre: Satire; Blue humor
- Based on: Sit Down, Shut Up by: Brendan Reed; Tim McLoughlan
- Developed by: Mitchell Hurwitz
- Showrunner: Josh Weinstein
- Voices of: Will Arnett; Jason Bateman; Kristin Chenoweth; Will Forte; Tom Kenny; Nick Kroll; Cheri Oteri; Kenan Thompson; Henry Winkler
- Composer: David Schwartz
- Country of origin: United States
- Original language: English
- No. of seasons: 1
- No. of episodes: 13

Production
- Executive producers: Mitchell Hurwitz; Josh Weinstein; Eric Tannenbaum; Kim Tannenbaum; Julie Meldal-Johnsen
- Producers: J. Michael Mendel; Claudia Katz
- Editors: Lee Harting; Damon P. Yoches
- Running time: 22–23 minutes
- Production companies: Tantamount Studios; ITV Studios; 20th Century Fox Television; Adelaide Productions; Sony Pictures Television

Original release
- Network: Fox
- Release: April 19 – November 21, 2009

Related
- Sit Down, Shut Up (2001 TV series)

Sit Down, Shut Up (sometimes also known as Sit Down, Shut Up! in some promos) is an American adult animated television series developed by Mitchell Hurwitz for the Fox Broadcasting Company. The series focuses on a group of high school teachers in a small town in Florida "who don't care about teaching". The series premiered on April 19, 2009, in the Fox's Animation Domination block on Fox, but after four episodes aired, Fox removed the show from the block due to low ratings. The remaining nine episodes aired on Saturdays at midnight from later in the year. The show was cancelled on November 21, 2009.

Based on the Australian live-action sitcom of the same name, creator Mitchell Hurwitz came up with the idea for an animated version in 2000. He wrote a script for a pilot episode, but "kept it in a drawer" until he pitched the show to multiple US networks in 2008 when he needed money. Hurwitz said that "it was just a wacky show, and nobody wanted it", but eventually Fox picked it up as a primetime animated series.

Sit Down, Shut Up met with mixed reviews from critics. Orlando Sentinel called the series a "disaster", and Newsday called it "raw, vulgar and blithely offensive, with so many triple and quadruple entendres for so many sexual acts". The Hollywood Reporter criticized the series' use of fourth wall breaks, and said that it was "painful to watch how hard the show tries to be funny". IGN gave it a more positive review, saying "it should continue to be a very entertaining show", and TV Squad said that it "definitely grows on you". It was nominated an Artios Award for its casting in 2009.

== Characters ==
- Ennis Hofftard (voiced by Will Arnett) is a cyclist who teaches English and chases women. His catchphrase is "Catchphrases are for losers!" He is inept at thinking his plans through, usually causing even more trouble, and he seldom thinks about anything unless it has something to do with a woman or the promise of avoiding work. Ennis has a sexual interest in Miracle, as shown by his interest in seeing her breasts. He is shown to be very talented when it comes to getting women, even being a dating teacher before becoming an English teacher. He has also exhibited on several occasions the internal thought processes of a house cat which he refers to as his "comfort kitty" (a foul-tongued live-action cat) because he is cowardly. He was influenced by a feeling of failure to live up to his military dad but he later learns that his father was also a cowardly figure who has a comfort kitty of his own.
- Larry Littlejunk (voiced by Jason Bateman) is the gym teacher, and the only staff member who can teach; he can be seen as the protagonist for these reasons. He refers to himself as "Larry L." because he is embarrassed by his last name, and his catchphrase is "Why can't someone else teach P.E.?" He is apparently the only qualified teacher, but he lost the science/computer teacher position to Miracle Grohe because of her "nude" presentation (which, for censorship reasons, was never shown). He is hopelessly in love with Miracle, but at the same time can't stand how airheaded she is, so he insults her instead of telling her how he feels. He has been shown dating other women, but still goes into dazed states when around Miracle. In an early promo for the series, the character was named Larry Slimp.
- Miracle Grohe (voiced by Kristin Chenoweth) is a spiritual hippie barefoot science teacher who often brings her infant son Merch (who has been shown to be smarter than his mother) to school as she believes that babies should always be with their mothers. Her catchphrase is "Babies are gifts from God! Drummers are creeps!" Though she is a science teacher, she believes in things a science teacher wouldn't (Mother Earth, mysticism, fortunes, etc.). She is also very gullible, for example taking the statement "you're too pretty to be in school" as a compliment. It is implied throughout the show that she also likes Larry, but gets angered whenever he doubts her spirituality. Her mother, seen in a flashback, had her as a teenager. She also runs an underground Pillow Fight Club (a parody of Fight Club) that appears to be worldwide. Comedian Maria Bamford was originally cast as Miracle Grohe but was later replaced by Chenoweth. The executives still allowed Bamford to do some "side voices" on the show.
- Stuart Proszakian (voiced by Will Forte) – Assistant Principal. His catchphrase is "I need a catchphrase!" Usually smiling and relatively jubilant, he is the most oblivious character in the show, clearly shown when he stated "He is so oblivious he probably doesn't even realize he is talking about himself" when he was talking about himself. Before becoming assistant principal he worked as a prison clown in a Florida penitentiary, and in "Miracle's Are Real", performed a disturbing song for Larry while dressed up as a clown in a black-and-white-striped prison jumpsuit. Stuart has a habit of shortening the word "assistant" to simply "ass" (such as "ass principal" or "ass coach") on job titles. It is heavily suggested throughout the series he is completely insane.
- Muhannad Sabeeh "Happy" Fa-ach Nuabar (voiced by Tom Kenny) is the secretive custodian. In the first few episodes, he speaks only in Arabic, which is overdubbed by an English translation that also makes comments about Happy as well, similar to a narrator. In later episodes he speaks fractured English and no longer has a translator. He lives in a shack on the school grounds. His catchphrase is roughly translated into English as "I am fond of America", though the way he says it sounds like hatred toward America. The actual words are a mondegreen for "I am fond of America", so it might be a mistranslation on his translator's part. Before he began speaking English on his own, the characters couldn't understand him, leading them to think he said the opposite of what he really said. He is often the subject of stereotypical jokes, as in one episode he is seen walking around with a bundle of dynamite and in a promotional photo, is seen leaking toxic gas into the faculty room. It is also suggested he pees in Ennis' coffee, as when he needed to go to the bathroom he imagined Ennis' coffee mug. He also is implied to think he is cancerous, as shown when he kisses Larry to give him cancer out of spite for disrespecting Miracle's beliefs.
- Andrew LeGustambos (voiced by Nick Kroll) is the flamboyant and bisexual drama teacher. His catchphrase is "Speak up." In Spanish, Andrew's last name roughly translates to "he likes both", a reference to his bisexuality. He is in love with both Miracle and Larry, hoping they get together so he could get together with them, though it's rarely shown in future episodes. He later becomes a narcissist after seeing himself in a dress. He resents Jose Canseco, for an incident that happened in his childhood when he played baseball. According to voice actor Kroll, Andrew is (alongside Helen) a loser amongst losers. Kroll voices him to talk like a "modern day Snagglepuss". In an early promo, the character was named Andrew Sapien.
- Helen Klench (voiced by Cheri Oteri) is the unappreciated librarian who often gets mistaken for objects such as brooms or toilet brushes, leading her to become angry when people ignore or cut her off. Her catchphrase is "Quiet down!" She seems to have high levels of testosterone, which is balanced out by taking female hormone drugs (which Vice Principal Prozackian was given when it was believed that the hormone drugs were steroids). Helen is skinny but is considered unattractive in relation to Miracle. In one episode, it was revealed because of her extreme loneliness, she has a habit of falling in love with inanimate objects and lives with a lot of cats. She has a close friendship with Andrew, as the two frequently talk and exchange gossip together. She was an alumnus of Knob Haven High School, where she and Sue formed a musical duo, and she was obese back then.
- Sue Sezno (voiced by Kenan Thompson) is the "acting" Black principal of Knob Haven. She got the job due to a mysterious accident involving the last principal and a pair of metal claws. Sue's style is stern, firm and to the point. In her eyes, there are no dumb questions, just plenty of dumb people. As evidenced by her last name, she rarely (if ever) says "Yes." Her catchphrase is "No." She is also a hypocrite, clearly shown when she stated that she would have quit before firing any of the teachers, just to moments later fire Willard, and again when she pressured everyone to keep the School Fair fair, she cheated during the raffle. She is also shown to be incredibly lazy, giving the bare minimum to Miracle so she could become a teacher again because she didn't want to do the work of finding a new teacher, as well as saving the teachers who suffered a heart attack because she didn't want to have to do the paperwork. This as well as having no care for her fellow staff, as when she saw them have heart attacks, she just gave herself the rest of the day off, as well as planning to blame all of the school's problems on them at a meeting in Washington, D.C. It is revealed in the episode "Hurricane Willard", her full name is Susanna Louise Sezno. She is rarely in the spotlight when it comes to love interests, hooking up with Happy in "Back In Time" and becoming impressed with Stuart at the end of "Hurricane Willard."
- Willard Deutschebog (voiced by Henry Winkler) is a middle-aged German teacher with very low self-esteem. His catchphrase is, "If I believed in reincarnation, I'd kill myself tonight." He still is highly influenced by his mother for whom he used his position as a driving teacher to run errands. In one episode, he promised to dump his girlfriend because his mom said "she was a whore." In another episode, when presented with the option of a beautiful woman wanting to marry him, he responded, "I'm sorry. I promised my mother I would die alone." He's constantly fretting about his job and is normally homeless to the point where he lives in completely random places (the school football field, in the belfry of a tower, in the closet in the teacher's lounge). He has a fear of driving that stems from crashing his car into a drive-in theater screen during a sexual experience. To get around, he arranges for emergency vehicles and hearses to pick him up and take him where he wants to go by lying about sickness, fire, or death. Later, after he obtains the position of the school's driving instructor, he begins using the driver training car for his personal transportation. He also doesn't have an e-mail account or a phone. He has a habit of being a blabbermouth. In the 1930s, became infamous for making love with his teacher, and was known as "The Whoop-De-Doo Kid". He also apparently forages the school dumpster for food every day at 3:00. Despite his feelings of isolation due to his mother and terrible social skills, Ennis sees Willard as his closest friend and constantly takes it upon himself to defend him from any perceived taunting. In the episode "Tackin'" it is revealed by Ennis his middle name is either Leonard or Herbert.

== Episodes ==
No.	Title	Directed by	Written by	Original release date	Prod. code
1	"Pilot"	Dwayne Carey-Hill	Mitchell Hurwitz	April 19, 2009	SIT-101
Acting principal Susan Sezno is threatening to fire one of the teachers of Knob Haven High School due to budget cuts and reports of misconduct. Meanwhile, Vice Principal (and former prison entertainer) Stuart Proszakian ingests pills that are suspected to be steroids, thanks to the predictions of the ditzy, new-age hippie science teacher, Miracle Grohe. Meanwhile, German teacher Willard Deutschebog is desperate to hide his porno magazines and seeks the help of English teacher Ennis Hofftard for help, Helen seeks to find the school time capsule, and Andrew tries to get the attention of Larry and Miracle, only to end up interested in Stuart when he arrives at the school with full, augmented breasts.
2	"Miracle's Are Real"	Raymie Muzquiz	Mitchell Hurwitz and Jim Vallely	April 26, 2009	SIT-102
Knob Haven High throws a fundraising fair where all the games aren't rigged, after Miracle accidentally poisons the faculty by giving them hemlock as gifts for the first day of spring. Larry, during his pursuit of Miracle, accidentally makes her lose her spiritual beliefs after interrupting and ruining her "astral event," which would have given her the love of her life. Larry tries to make the prophecy come true for her when he realizes this during the fair, while Helen and Andrew set out to prove that Principal Sezno is a hermaphrodite, and Ennis falls for a raffle-ball basket while caring for Miracle's baby.
3	"World's Greatest Teacher"	Frank Marino	Alex Herschlag	May 3, 2009	SIT-103
Larry volunteers to give a speech to impress Miracle, but Ennis steals Larry's thunder when a YouTube video of Ennis's ranting becomes popular. Meanwhile, Willard becomes a driver's-ed teacher so he can overcome his fear of driving and Helen the librarian discovers that Happy the Janitor is keeping the books she was ordered to burn.
4	"Back in Time"	Stephen Sandoval	Michael Colton & John Aboud	May 10, 2009	SIT-104
In this homage to 1980s films, Principal Sezno sets up a PTA party at Huey Lewis's house, Helen tries to find her identity, Larry ends up on a date with a cross-dressing Stuart (who keeps insisting that he’s his sister), and Willard drives a time-traveling DeLorean back to World War II Germany.
5	"High School Confidential"	Dwayne Carey-Hill	Aisha Muharrar	September 12, 2009	SIT-108
Sue crashes her car into Ennis and tries to conceal the accident by hiding him (still stuck halfway through the windshield of her car) in the auto-shop class until the school can afford insurance. Meanwhile, Stuart takes over the school's failing newspaper to try to make enough money to purchase insurance, and turns it into a tabloid and Miracle is forced to go back to high school after it is revealed that she never graduated.
6	"Taming of the Dude"	Ray Claffey	Michael Colton & John Aboud	September 19, 2009	SIT-112
When Ennis offers to school the staff on dating and relationship issues, Larry objects to his methods, then through a strange turn of events, he meets a mysterious lady from Ennis’ past. Meanwhile, Sue joins an underground society called "Pillow Fight Club" and finds that Miracle is a member.
7	"Hurricane Willard"	Raymie Muzquiz	Aaron Ehasz	September 26, 2009	SIT-109
When the town is threatened by a flood, the high-school gym is used as an emergency shelter and Willard seizes the opportunity to be respected through fear.
8	"Mr. Hofftard Goes to Washington"	Frank Marino	Dan Fybel & Rich Rinaldi	October 3, 2009	SIT-110
Sue Sezno ditches the teachers to testify in a Senate hearing about why Knob Haven High School is the worst school in the country and, to prevent her from going, the staff breaks into teams that race to stop her. Meanwhile, Ennis gets sidetracked as he tries to prove his bravery to his father. Meanwhile, Helen wants to be noticed by guys, so Miracle teaches her how to flirt and Happy and Stuart become desperate to find survival in a hot air balloon.
9	"Tackin"	Crystal Chesney-Thompson	Richard Day	October 10, 2009	SIT-113
When Larry hears from the Deep South Council of Physical Fitness, he tries to convince Sue to get rid of all the junk food, but Willard's latest heart attack and his description of Heaven leads to a dangerous new trend called "tackin'" where teenagers induce heart attacks to get high.
10	"Helen and Sue's High School Reunion"	Peter Avanzino	Alex Herschlag	October 24, 2009	SIT-107
Larry plans the school's reunion while Andrew plots revenge against Jose Canseco, Larry decides to seek a lost love, and Ennis believes Happy is planning a terrorist attack. Note: Alanis Morissette guest-stars as herself.
11	"Math Lab"	Crystal Chesney-Thompson	Laura Gutin	November 7, 2009	SIT-106
Misunderstanding his part in Knob Haven High’s anti-drug campaign, Stuart builds a meth lab instead of a math lab. Meanwhile, Larry takes the school’s affiliation with a pharmaceutical company a little too seriously. Note: This episode was originally planned to be aired on May 17th, 2009 as the first-season finale but was delayed. The episode was also planned to air in early September before being replaced by "High School Confidential".
12	"SpEd"	Ray Claffey	Dan Fybel & Rich Rinaldi	November 14, 2009	SIT-105
Ennis proctors the standardized tests for the gifted students and mistakenly convinces Happy to dump a truckload of kids into the harbor, forcing Larry to come to the rescue. Meanwhile, Willard tries to protect Stuart from a scam.
13	"High School Musical Musical"	Stephen Sandoval	Josh Weinstein	November 21, 2009	SIT-111
When Sue gives Andrew an ultimatum to turn around the drama department, he writes a musical starring the teachers. Meanwhile, Sue discovers that Ennis is smartest when he is intoxicated.

== Production ==
=== Creation and writing ===
Mitchell Hurwitz, creator of Arrested Development, came up with the Sit Down, Shut Up idea after watching the original Australian version created by Brendan Reed and Tim McLoughlan. He noted its similarities to the British version of The Office. He wrote a script in 2000, but "kept it in the drawer for a long time". Originally, he had planned the series to be live-action like its Australian counterpart. He pitched the show to multiple US networks, but most of them thought the characters were "too broad and way too self-centered and oblivious". He changed the mode to animation to "avoid some work". Originally titled Class Dismissed, the series was picked up by Fox in May 2008. Sit Down, Shut Up was produced by Tantamount Studios and Granada International Media in association with Sony Pictures Television and 20th Century Fox Television.

Hurwitz wrote the first script and decided to take a more "supervisory role". Josh Weinstein, a former writer for The Simpsons, was the showrunner, and Bill Oakley, another Simpsons writer, was originally on board, but ended his involvement with the show due to a contract dispute between the staff and Sony. Sony refused to offer a contract which operated under the complete terms of the Writers Guild of America. Eventually a compromise was reached, and production resumed in June 2008. Writers for the show include Josh Weinstein, Rich Rinaldi, Aisha Muharrar, Alex Herschlag, Laura Gutin, Dan Fybel, Aaron Ehasz, Michael Colton, and John Aboud.

=== Animation ===
The original (top), and final-cut character designs (bottom).

The show uses Eagle Rock High School as backgrounds for the animated characters. Hurwitz said that he "wanted to set the show in the real world, and the writing staff is made up of people that come from live action and from animation, so it expresses that mix well". He called it "just an aesthetic thing"; he saw Mo Willems' book Knuffle Bunny in a bookstore, and then contacted Willems. Willems designed the characters and they "started to do this technique". The images used for the school were taken at a school next door to the Rough Draft Studios, the series' animation studio. Hurwitz chose Rough Draft Studios as the series' animation studio because Bill Oakley and Josh Weinstein had a "great experience" with the studio when working on Futurama.

In March 2009, creator Hurwitz and the cast were present at WonderCon to promote the show. Hurwitz told the audience that they had just received "the first pieces of the show back" from the animation studio in South Korea, and showed the first clip of the show for the audience.

=== Casting ===
The cast includes former Arrested Development stars Jason Bateman, Will Arnett and Henry Winkler as Larry Littlejunk, Ennis Hofftard and Willard Deutschebog, respectively. Arnett noted that Ennis is one of the "dumber" characters he has played. Kristin Chenoweth is the voice of science teacher Miracle Grohe, a barefoot spiritual hippie. Comedian Maria Bamford was originally cast as Miracle, but was later replaced by Chenoweth. The executives still allowed Bamford to do some "side voices" on the show. Will Forte voices Stuart Proszakian, the assistant principal. In late April 2008, Variety reported that Regina King would have an unspecified role. She was replaced by Kenan Thompson, who took over the role as acting principal Sue Sezno. Thompson thinks he was the last cast member picked, and said that "they had another lady doing the voice" before he was hired. Cheri Oteri was picked as the voice of Helen Klench, a "totally unresourceful" librarian, and Nick Kroll was picked as the voice of Andrew LeGustambos, the drama teacher whose surname translates "he likes both", referring to his bisexuality. According to Kroll, Andrew is, alongside Helen, a loser amongst losers. Kroll voices him to talk like a "modern day Snagglepuss". Tom Kenny voices Muhammad Sabeeh "Happy" Fa-ach Nuabar, the secretive custodian that speaks only in Arabic, which is overdubbed by an English translation. In later episodes, however, he speaks fractured English and no longer has a translator. Singer Alanis Morissette guest starred as herself in the episode "Helen and Sue's High School Reunion".

== Reception ==
=== Critical response ===
Sit Down, Shut Up has received mixed reviews and currently has a 24% rating on Rotten Tomatoes and a 42/100 rating on Metacritic. One of the positive reviews has come from the Chicago Sun-Times, who said that the cast ensemble was tough to beat and had much potential, but they also said "This embarrassment of riches isn't necessarily an embarrassment, but it's not the slam dunk it should be, either." Variety says "Despite a pedigree that includes Arrested Development creator Mitch Hurwitz and many of that program’s stars, Sit Down seldom rises above sniggering double entendre. Seemingly preoccupied with impressing teenage boys, the show, based on the Australian series created by Brendan Reed and Tim McLoughlin, should possess scant appeal outside that demo". One of the most negative reviews came from Glenn Garvin of The Miami Herald who said "Hurwitz is only the first of many talents wasted to the point of criminality in this animated adaptation of a flopped Australian sitcom." and "Staleness, however, ranks as a virtue in Sit Down, Shut Up, for the show's token stabs at topicality are truly appalling."

Genevieve Koski of The A.V. Club gave the pilot episode a positive review and graded it a B. She said she was "staying optimistic that the characters are going to get fleshed out in upcoming episodes, because this is obviously going to be a character-based ensemble comedy. The plot of the pilot [...] was basically just a vehicle to introduce the various eccentricities of the staff as they all tried to show Principal Sezno they weren't expendable. It was also a platform for the Arrested Development-like meta humor that's apparently going to pervade the show". Jonah Krakow of IGN was more positive about the episode, noting the "familiar aspects" of "deft wordplay, biting sarcasm and inappropriate humor" from Arrested Development. He concluded, saying: "As long as the talented cast can continue to play to their strengths and the scripts can humorously tackle dicey subject matter, this should continue to be a very entertaining show." Kona Gallaghar of TV Squad watched the episode twice and was more impressed the second time. She said that "the show definitely grows on you". However, after watching the second episode, she stated: "The main problem I have right now with Sit Down, Shut Up, is that even that simple plot-point is too deep for it. Maybe I'm expecting too much from an animated series, but is it wrong to want the characters to feel at least as real as their backgrounds?".

=== Ratings ===
Order	Episode	Timeslot	Rating/share	Rating/share (18-49)	Viewers (millions)
1	"Pilot"	8:30	2.7/8	2.3/6	5.21
2	"Miracle's Are Real"	8:30	2.1/7	1.9/5	4.20
3	"World's Greatest Teacher"	7:00	1.0/4	0.8/3	2.09
4	"Back in Time"	7:00	0.6/3	0.7/3	1.59
5	"High School Confidential"	8:30	2.1/7	1.9/5	4.20

=== Cancellation ===
After two episodes had aired, the series' original 8:30 timeslot was moved to 7:00 due to low ratings. After the fourth episode aired, the fifth and final episode of what was to be the initial run of Sit Down, Shut Up, was pulled from the Sunday Animation Domination lineup due to what was speculated as continued low ratings. The remaining 9 episodes began airing on September 12, 2009, on Saturday nights at midnight (following the cancellation of Mad TV) on a loop until April 2010, when repeats of Brothers took over the time slot.

== Syndication ==
Comedy Central began airing Sit Down, Shut Up at 10:00 p.m. starting on May 4, 2010. For the next four weeks, new episodes aired in that time on Tuesdays with repeats several times throughout the night. However, in June of that same year, the show was moved to the late-night timeslots and aired only once. On July 28, 2010, Comedy Central stopped airing Sit Down, Shut Up after airing the episode "Hurricane Willard." Of the thirteen episodes that reran on Comedy Central, the pilot episode and "High School Confidential" were the only episodes that never aired. Adult Swim picked up the series in November 2014, and it ran its entirety before being removed from its schedule on February 15, 2015. Sit Down, Shut Up has aired on Canada's Much channel (formerly MuchMusic) beginning in April 2014, after previously being shown on Comedy (formerly known as The Comedy Network) in 2013, until the network removed the show from their lineup two months later.

Sit Down, Shut Up! was formerly available on the streaming service Tubi.
