= The Cat That Laid the Golden Hairball =

- The Ren & Stimpy Show episode
- Episode no.: Season 2 Episode 8b
- Directed by: Ron Hughart
- Story by: Bob Camp; Vincent Waller
- Production code: RS5-9A
- Original air date: April 3, 1993

Episode chronology
← Previous "The Great Outdoors"	Next → "Stimpy's Fan Club"

"The Cat That Laid the Golden Hairball" is the sixteenth episode of the second season of The Ren & Stimpy Show. It originally aired on Nickelodeon in the United States on April 3, 1993.

== Plot ==
Ren and Stimpy live in a birdhouse. Ren wakes up to find the house laced with Stimpy's hairballs. Angered, he proceeds to watch television before punishing Stimpy, only to find that feline hairballs have been proved to be useful in spaceflight and curing conjunctivitis, a surprisingly versatile clothing material, and an alternative to breakfast cereal, causing its value to rise beyond that of gold. Ren, consumed yet again by greed and his desire to get pectoral muscles via implants, is overjoyed.

Stimpy, who works as an aircraft pilot in the episode, returns home to Ren forcing him to produce hairballs in a factory line. Ren grades the hairballs produced by Stimpy while his nephew by marriage, Bubba the Lummox, helps box them; he secretly hides one to sell for his own personal gain.

Ren starts to demand more hairballs, which causes Stimpy's arm to get licked clean of hair. When Stimpy attempts to protest, Ren drops a cinderblock on Stimpy's head and responds, "Shut up and lick your other arm!" Trying to keep up with Ren's demands results in all the hair on Stimpy's body getting licked off, and the "hwarfing" process becoming too physically taxing for Stimpy to handle. Eventually Ren, while grading hairballs, accidentally stamps a naked Stimpy on the butt, the latter having apparently collapsed from trying to keep up.

Stimpy proceeds to use Ren's fur and Bubba's body hair to no avail. Bubba is horrified at first, but accepts it for his monetary gain. Stimpy is abused and exploited to his limits; he vomits bones instead of hairballs, implying cannibalism, while Bubba goes into Stimpy's body, finding his hairball gland to be ruined to the point it collapses into powder. Stimpy, extremely exhausted from the ordeal, collapses while Ren and Bubba cry over his inability to produce more hairballs, only to realize they had indeed produced more than enough hairballs to buy whatever they want (and that the episode had run its course); they celebrate by dancing.

== Cast ==
- Billy West as Ren, Stimpy, and newscaster
- Bob Camp as Bubba

== Production ==
The episode was started by Spümcø in 1992 and it fell behind schedule and over budget. The script for the episode was taken from a fan-made comic sent to Spümcø, with Bob Camp and Vincent Waller modifying the story to fit the runtime. As a cost-saving measure, the layout stage of the episode was done at Rough Draft Korea in Seoul, who also provided animation, instead of Spümcø in Los Angeles. When series creator John Kricfalusi was fired on September 21, 1992, Games Animation took over. Ron Hughart, an individual considered to be reliable by both Kricfalusi and Nickelodeon executives, was assigned to be director, as Vincent Waller left the series' production while working on "The Great Outdoors" at Rough Draft Korea. Billy West voices Ren in the episode as voice acting had not been done before Kricfalusi's departure.

== Reception ==
Thad Komorowski gave the episode three out of five stars, criticizing its annoying juvenile humor even for Ren & Stimpy standards.

== Books ==
- Dobbs, G. Michael (2015). Escape – How Animation Broke into the Mainstream in the 1990s. Orlando: BearManor Media. ISBN 978-1593931100.
- Komorowski, Thad (2017). Sick Little Monkeys: The Unauthorized Ren & Stimpy Story. Albany, Georgia: BearManor Media. ISBN 978-1629331836.
