= Monica Lee Gradischek =

American actress (born 1971)

- Born: December 15, 1971 (age 54); Jeannette, Pennsylvania, U.S.
- Occupation: Actress
- Website: http://www.seemonicalee.com

Monica Lee Gradischek (born December 15, 1971) is an American actress and has voiced roles in animation, commercials and video games.

She played Minnie Fay in Hello, Dolly!, starring Carol Channing. A review in 1996 called her characterization "a helium-voiced hoot".

== Film and television roles ==
- Sunshine – Emily "Sunshine" Miranda – (Winner Best Comedy, Mini DV Festival 2004, LA)
- Related – Co-Star
- As the World Turns – Recurring
- All My Children – Guest Star
- Duck – Co-Star
- Boom Man – Housewife from Hell
- Off the Leash – Self
- The Fresh Beat Band – Ms. Piccolo
- Wizards of Waverly Place – Lunch Lady
- Bones – Hair Customer
- Melissa & Joey – Woman
- The Mindy Project – Mrs. Molloy
- All the Way to the Top – Julia (also served as casting director)
- Hollywood – Lucille Reimann

=== Animation ===
- Squirrel Boy – Darlene
- Rocket Power – Various Children
- Sniz and Fondue – Bianca
- The Simpsons – Various Children
- Shrek 2 (Trailer) – Lead Singer
- Prickles, The Cactus (Pilot) (shown on What a Cartoon!) – Prickles
- Bad Jenny (Pilot) – Mom

== Theater ==
- Bark! The Musical – Boo – (The Coast Playhouse)
- Mame – Cousin Fan – (Hollywood Bowl)
- Without a Net Improv – Member – (NYC Improv Group)
- About Face – Maggie – (BMI Theatre)
- Fireflies in the Sun – Linda – (Greenwich Theatre)
- Gatsby Concert – Lucinda the Maid – (Time Warner Theatre)
- Working – Waitress – (Circle in the Square Theatre)
- Annie – Annie

=== Broadway ===
- Grease – Frenchy
- Hello, Dolly! – Minnie Fay
- More to Love – Maxine

== Video games ==
- RTX Red Rock (2003) – I.R.I.S.
- Barbie Rapunzel – Rapunzel
- ABCmouse.com – Granny Franny
