= How Murray Saved Christmas =

2014 American Christmas special

- DVD cover
- Based on: How Murray Saved Christmas by Mike Reiss
- Written by: Mike Reiss
- Directed by: Peter Avanzino
- Starring: Jerry Stiller; Sean Hayes; Kevin Michael Richardson; Jason Alexander; John Ratzenberger
- Narrated by: Dennis Haysbert
- Music by: Walter Murphy
- Country of origin: United States
- Original language: English

Production
- Producers: Claudia Katz; Lee Supercinski
- Editor: Paul D. Calder
- Running time: 42 minutes
- Production company: Universal Animation Studios

Original release
- Network: NBC
- Release: December 5, 2014

How Murray Saved Christmas is a 2014 animated musical television special, directed by Peter Avanzino and written by Mike Reiss. The story, narrated in verse, is based on Reiss's 2000 picture book of the same name. Voice actors included Jerry Stiller, Sean Hayes, Kevin Michael Richardson, Jason Alexander, John Ratzenberger, and Dennis Haysbert.

The special premiered on December 5, 2014, on NBC. It was nominated for an Emmy Award for Outstanding Original Music and Lyrics. The special was the first Universal Animation Studios production for NBC.

== Plot ==
A quaint little town called Stinky Cigars, a secret location hidden only by a name that was chosen to repel tourists, is populated by iconic holiday characters from every culture around the world. It is home to Santa Claus and his workshop full of hard-working elves, alongside other holiday figures ranging from Cupid, the Easter Bunny, George Washington and Abraham Lincoln, Arbor Day Aardvark and Labor Day Amos.

The story, which is narrated in verse and "cheekily punctuated" by original songs, centers on Edison Elf (Sean Hayes), an optimistic inventor who presents Santa with an unexpectedly hazardous new toy, and Murray Weiner (Jerry Stiller), the cranky owner of the town's diner, known as "Murray's Holiday Diner". Murray's talent for delivering orders makes the unwilling curmudgeon the only person in town who can fill in for an injured Santa (Kevin Michael Richardson) on Christmas Eve.

== Cast ==
- Jerry Stiller as Murray Weiner
- Sean Hayes as Edison Elf
- Kevin Michael Richardson as Santa Claus and Easter Bunny
- Jason Alexander as Doc Holiday
- John Ratzenberger as Officer Bender
- Dennis Haysbert as the Baby New Year and the Narrator
- Nick Jameson, Tom Kenny, Maurice LaMarche, Tress MacNeille and Billy West as various characters

== Production ==
How Murray Saved Christmas was produced by Universal Animation Studios, with the animation being done by Rough Draft Studios, both of which are based in Glendale, California.

Mike Reiss, a writer and producer on The Simpsons, sought to bring a "Simpsons sensibility" to Christmas specials. Reiss adapted the script from his 2000 children's book of the same name and its 2002 sequel Santa Claustrophobia, which were both illustrated by David Catrow.

== Reception ==
The special received 3.57 million viewers and a 0.9/3 rating/share.

How Murray Saved Christmas received mixed reviews from critics. The review-aggregation website Rotten Tomatoes gives the special a score of 50% based on reviews from 6 critics, with an average score of 3.7/10. The review-aggregation website Metacritic, which assigns a normalized rating out of 100 top reviews from mainstream critics, calculated a score of 60 out of 100 based on 4 reviews, indicating "mixed or average" reviews.

Patrick Kevin Day of the Los Angeles Times gave the special a positive review: "It's the kind of special that harried parents may want to turn on for their own tired parents to help babysit the kids. They'll enjoy the extended tribute to milkmen". Robert Bianco of USA Today gave the special a positive review: "The very multicultural Murray is one of those rare holiday specials the entire family can enjoy for years to come".

Brian Lowry of Variety gave the special credit for delivering on its "snarky promise" by bringing the Simpsons' style to Christmas specials:

Playfully irreverent ... and clearly pitched to tickle adults along with kids, Murray features such moments as a sprightly elf ditty with the lyrics: "We never miss a day of work, 'cause we don't have health insurance". Nor are the tots likely to get throwaway gags like a store named Salvador's Dollies.

Nevertheless, Lowry gave the special a negative review, stating that "at the risk of sounding like a Grinch, while Murray gets the sleigh off the ground, How Murray Saved Christmas doesn't manage to stay airborne". Erik Adams of The A.V. Club gave the special a C+, saying: "Sentiment- and story-wise, How Murray Saved Christmas is all over the place, but its joke-telling abilities live up to the shiniest lines on its creators' resumes".

== Awards ==
Composer Walter Murphy and writer/lyricist Mike Reiss were nominated for a 2015 Primetime Emmy Award for Outstanding Original Music and Lyrics for How Murray Saved Christmas.

== Release ==
How Murray Saved Christmas was released on DVD on December 16, 2014.
