= Stimpy's Fan Club =

- The Ren & Stimpy Show episode
- Episode no.: Season 2 Episode 9a
- Directed by: Peter Avanzino
- Story by: Elinor Blake; John Kricfalusi
- Production code: RS5-13A
- Original air date: April 24, 1993

Episode chronology
← Previous "The Cat That Laid the Golden Hairball"	Next → "A Visit to Anthony"

"Stimpy's Fan Club" is the seventeenth episode of the second season of The Ren & Stimpy Show. It originally aired on Nickelodeon in the United States on April 24, 1993.

== Plot ==
Ren contemplates murdering Stimpy by twisting his neck, holding up his hands as his to-be murder weapon. Other similar parts of this scene have animation errors of Ren having five fingers instead of four on each hand.

Ren and Stimpy are popular Yugoslav entertainers who are the stars of the eponymous children's television series, having a massive fanbase around the globe; despite this, they still reside in a caravan. One day, they sit at home where they suddenly receive a large amount of fan mail. Ren finds that all of them are addressed towards Stimpy, and breaks into tears for his apparent lack of appreciation from viewers. Trying to make Ren feel good, he assigns him to be the president of his fan club; Ren misinterprets this as the President of the United States, which he envisions obliterating Australia with a nuclear weapon; he agrees to take up this occupation.

Ren's first task is to answer Stimpy's fan mail. The fan mail alternate between pure appreciation of Stimpy and asking Stimpy for advice (a reference to the Ask Dr. Stupid interstitials); the children have no actual dislike for Ren, either making no reference to Ren or merely confused by what type of animal is Ren due to his appearance. Ren answers properly at first, but he is offended by a letter from a child who is concerned about wetting his bed. Ren, who also wets his bed and has no idea it is a common occurrence in children, decides to chastise the child for his behavior with a highly offensive letter but is stopped by Stimpy. Ren, feeling useless, decides to force Stimpy to assist in his suicide, but Stimpy refuses to do so; both do not realize the knife is made of rubber. Ren continues to write offensive responses to fan mail, including one from a neglected girl, which he berates in abusive fashion; he is visibly mentally unstable at this point.

At night, Ren had reached his breaking point; he is unable to sleep, bemoaning his perceived inferiority and his lowly status as "president." Ren describes his hands as "dirty" after writing the rude analyses to Stimpy's fans. He attempts to wipe off the invisible dirt, but it won't come off (in reference to Macbeth by Shakespeare, when Lady Macbeth begins to believe she is unable to wash her hands of blood after she finds herself responsible for the death of King Duncan, even though she did not commit the act herself). His dark triad personality traits showing at his most deranged state, Ren decides to murder Stimpy in his sleep by breaking his neck, reveling in his sadistic enjoyment of the horror of millions of children witnessing the death of their favorite celebrity. He reflects on how it would be done with his dirty hands. Just as he is about to do the deed, his conscience attacks in the form of an intracranial aneurysm, causing Ren great pain and stopping him from committing the crime; it is implied that he had attempted similarly immoral deeds, only to fail due to intracranial aneurysms. Ren begins to hallucinate the fires of Hell rising up out of the bottom of the screen, which then consume him as the screen fades to black.

In the morning, Ren decides to delay his murder plans to later, while pretending to be Stimpy in a fairly ineffective disguise; he finds the mailman delivering mail yet again, demanding him not to deliver mail to Stimpy. The mailman does not see through the disguise, but he is here to deliver a single letter to Ren. Ren reads the letter, believing it to be his first fan mail, only to find that Stimpy wrote it to make him feel good. Ren, realizing the errors in his ways, apologizes to Stimpy and cries. A crowd, led by Mr. Horse, watches outside while feeling uncomfortable with the situation.

== Cast ==
- Billy West as Ren, Stimpy, and the mailman
- Jonathan Baron as Sammy
- Melissa Fahn as Cindy/Debra
- Adam Ryan as Johnny

== Production ==
The episode was envisioned as part of the second season, that had been ordered in November 1991. The script had been written by series creator John Kricfalusi and his then-girlfriend Elinor Blake. Production had started at Spümcø in 1992, but little in the way of drawing for the episode had been completed by the time Spümcø lost the contract on September 21, 1992. In one of his last performances as Ren, Kricfalusi recorded the dialogue for the episode, as voice acting had been completed shortly before he was fired. Games Animation took over production of the episode: Peter Avanzino, one of the few new hires at Spümcø during the second season who migrated to Games Animation, served as director and storyboard artist for the episode. He salvaged what Kricfalusi had left behind and rebuilt it into what Kricfalusi had envisioned as closely as possible, to the point he was honored as the sole director of the episode. Animation was done at Rough Draft Korea in Seoul, where Avanzino would be closely acquainted and take up employment for a majority of his career years later.

== Censorship ==
The episode was banned in the United Kingdom for the amount of violence in it. This includes a scene where Ren goes on a psychopathic rampage in an attempt to murder Stimpy in his sleep. The episode "Out West" was also banned for similar reasons where characters were hung in the gallows for comedic effect.

== Reception ==
American journalist Thad Komorowski gave the episode four out of five stars. He praised Kricfalusi's voice acting in "Stimpy's Fan Club" as his "last masterwork for the series", stating that Kricfalusi's voice acting "does the heaviest lifting" of the episode. While he believed Avanzino was not capable of bringing the episode's dramatic moments to its fullest potential, he nevertheless considered it to be a good episode.

== Books ==
- Dobbs, G. Michael (2015). Escape – How Animation Broke into the Mainstream in the 1990s. Orlando: BearManor Media. ISBN 978-1593931100.
- Finley, Laura L. (2018). Violence in Popular Culture American and Global Perspectives. Santa Monica: ABC-CLIO. ISBN 9781440854330.
- Komorowski, Thad (2017). Sick Little Monkeys: The Unauthorized Ren & Stimpy Story. Albany, Georgia: BearManor Media. ISBN 978-1629331836.
