= Duckman =

American adult animated sitcom

- Also known as: Duckman: Private Dick/Family Man
- Genre: Adult animation Animated sitcom Black comedy Surreal humor Satire; Neo-noir; Comedy drama
- Created by: Everett Peck
- Based on: Duckman by Everett Peck
- Developed by: Jeff Reno; Ron Osborn; Gábor Csupó; Arlene Klasky; Everett Peck
- Directed by: Peter Avanzino; John Eng; Jeff McGrath; Raymie Muzquiz
- Voices of: Jason Alexander; Gregg Berger; Nancy Travis; Dana Hill (1994–1996); Pat Musick; E. G. Daily; Dweezil Zappa
- Composers: Scott Wilk; Todd Yvega
- Country of origin: United States
- No. of seasons: 4
- No. of episodes: 70 (list of episodes)

Production
- Executive producers: Everett Peck; Jeff Reno; Ron Osborn; Arlene Klasky; Gábor Csupó; David Misch (1997)
- Producers: Sherry Gunther (1994–1995); Michael Markowitz (1995–1996); Margot Pipkin (1995–1997); Mitch Watson (1997); Gene Laufenberg (1997)
- Running time: 22–23 minutes
- Production companies: Klasky Csupo; Reno & Osborn Productions; Paramount Television

Original release
- Network: USA Network
- Release: March 5, 1994 – September 6, 1997

Duckman: Private Dick/Family Man, commonly known simply as Duckman, is an American adult animated sitcom created and developed by Everett Peck, based on the characters he created in his 1990 one-shot comic book published by Dark Horse Comics. Duckman aired on the USA Network from March 5, 1994, through September 6, 1997, for 4 seasons and 70 episodes.

It follows the surreal life and misadventures of Eric Tiberius Duckman (voiced by Jason Alexander), a private detective who lives with his family. The series is known for a unique blend of satire, dark humor, noir, and surrealism.

After airing in syndication, the series gained a cult following. Spin-off media include volume DVDs released from 2008 to 2009, a comic book collection released by Topps between 1994 and 1996, a Complete Series DVD set released in 2018, and a video game entitled Duckman: The Graphic Adventures of a Private Dick for Microsoft Windows. The series was listed among IGN's "Top 100 Best Animated TV Shows" in 2009 and received three nominations at the Primetime Emmy Awards.

== Plot ==
Left to right: Duckman, Bernice, Ajax, Gecko, Charles and Mambo, "Grandma-ma", and Cornfed.

In a universe where humans and anthropomorphic animals coexist, the series centers on Eric Tiberius Duckman (voiced by Jason Alexander), a widowed, lewd, self-hating, egocentric anthropomorphic duck who lives with his family in Los Angeles (as mentioned in the episode "Bev Takes a Holiday") and works as a private detective. The tagline of the show, seen in the opening credits, is "Private Dick/Family Man".

Main characters include Cornfed (voiced by Gregg Berger), a pig who is Duckman's Joe Friday–esque loyal business partner and only friend; Ajax (voiced by Dweezil Zappa), Duckman's eldest, slow-witted teenage son; Charles (voiced by Dana Hill and later Pat Musick) and Mambo (voiced by E. G. Daily), Duckman's genius dicephalic parapagus twins; Bernice (voiced by Nancy Travis), the identical twin of Duckman's presumed-dead wife Beatrice, a fanatical fitness buff who hates Duckman with a passion; and Grandma-ma (voiced by Travis), Duckman's comatose, immensely flatulent mother-in-law.

Recurring characters include Agnes Delrooney (voiced by Brian Doyle-Murray), Grandma-ma's doppelgänger who kidnaps her and poses as her until near the end of the final season; Fluffy and Uranus (voiced by Musick), Duckman's two obsessively politically correct Care Bear–esque pink and blue teddy bear office assistants; George Herbert Walker "King" Chicken (voiced by Tim Curry), a supervillain who schemes to ruin Duckman's life as retribution for ruining his high school tenure; Beverly (voiced by Travis), Beatrice and Bernice's long-lost sister; and Gecko, Duckman's pet dog (which he had stolen and renamed).

In the final episode, four couples (Dr. Stein/Dana Reynard, Duckman/Honey, King Chicken/Bernice, Cornfed/Beverly) get married – the last three in a joint ceremony. The kids, Fluffy and Uranus, and a number of characters from previous episodes are in attendance. As the ceremonies draw to a close, Beatrice (Duckman's supposedly deceased wife) appears and shocks the entire crowd. When Duckman asks how she can still be alive, Beatrice indicates Cornfed always knew. Cornfed says, "I can explain." The show then ends with "To be continued...?" superimposed on the screen. In regards to this cliffhanger, Duckman writer Michael Markowitz offered the following shortly after the series came to an end: "We never formally planned Part II... and I'll never tell what I personally had in mind. I'm hoping to leave it to my heirs, for the inevitable day when Duckman is revived by future generations." On August 13, 2015, Markowitz posted on his Twitter page in response to a question from a fan about the cliffhanger, "Was then (& now) an #XFiles fan (bride in ep was Dana Reynard, a Mulder-Scully hint) so involved gov't coverup of aliens".

== Production ==
The series consists of 70 episodes that aired on Saturday nights from 1994 to 1997 at 10:30 PM and later 10:00 PM on the USA Network. It later reran on Comedy Central from 2000 to 2006. In Spain, it aired on Canal+ in the 1990s and on Cartoon Network from 2000 to 2001 through a nightly block aimed at adults, vaguely as a pre-beta to Adult Swim, both times alongside The Critic. In the United Kingdom, it aired on Sky 1, BBC Two and Paramount Comedy and in Canada, it is a former program on MTV2 and Teletoon. In New Zealand the show initially screened late on Friday nights on TVNZ 1, later moving to late Sunday nights on TVNZ 2. The initial showrunners were Peck, Reno and Osborn, and the show was produced in association with Paramount Network Television. Klasky Csupo animated and produced the show; around the same time, they were also producing Aaahh!!! Real Monsters on Nickelodeon. In later years, the show running duties went to David Misch and Michael Markowitz. Creator and executive producer Everett Peck was with the show for its entire run. Producer Gene Laufenberg was with the show for most of its run. Scott Wilk and Todd Yvega created original music for the series, including the theme. The first season also featured music from Frank Zappa's published catalog (Zappa died several months prior to this series' premiere).

== Episodes ==
Season	Episodes	Originally released	
Season	Episodes	First released	Last released
1	13	March 5, 1994	June 11, 1994
2	9	March 11, 1995	May 8, 1995
3	20	January 6, 1996	July 6, 1996
4	28	January 4, 1997	September 6, 1997

== Merchandise ==
=== Comic books ===
Between 1993 and 1996, various comic books were published by Topps based on the TV series. These were largely written and drawn by others, including Jay Lynch, Scott Shaw and Craig Yoe. Topps also reprinted Peck's original 1990 Duckman comic.

=== Home media ===
In January 2008, TVShowsOnDVD.com reported that Duckman would be coming to region 1 DVD. Details followed in May, when it was announced that the first release in the series would be the first two seasons, 22 combined episodes on three discs, on September 16, 2008. The final two seasons, 48 episodes, were released on a seven-disc set on January 6, 2009. Both DVD sets were released by CBS DVD/Paramount Home Entertainment.

With the DVD releases, many episodes were edited to remove copyrighted music because of royalty issues. As a result, they differ somewhat from the aired TV episodes. However, Everett Peck was involved in the process of the DVD releases and he felt the most important music was preserved.

The Complete Series DVD was released on February 6, 2018.

Title	Season(s)	Episode count	Release date
Volume 1: The Complete First and Second Seasons	1 and 2	22	September 16, 2008
This three-disc release contained the entire first two seasons.
Volume 2: The Complete Third and Fourth Seasons	3 and 4	48	January 6, 2009
This seven-disc release contained the entire final two seasons.
The Complete Series	1–4	70	February 6, 2018
This ten-disc release contained the entire series.

=== Video game ===
In May 1997, a point-and-click adventure computer game, Duckman: The Graphic Adventures of a Private Dick, was released for Microsoft Windows. In it, Duckman has become a famous detective, and a television series based on him is about to debut, but someone is pushing Duckman out of his own life and replacing him with a bigger, better, heroic Duckman. The player's goal is to help Duckman get rid of the impostor and reclaim his rightful place. A PlayStation port was planned for a release in the first quarter of 1997 but it was cancelled.

== Reception ==
The show was critically acclaimed. In January 2009, IGN listed Duckman as the 48th best in the Top 100 Best Animated TV Shows.

Episodes "T.V. or Not to Be", "Noir Gang", and "Haunted Society Plumbers" were nominated for a Primetime Emmy Award for Outstanding Animated Program in 1994, 1996, and 1997, respectively.

== Possible revival ==
In July 2026, an intro sequence for a proposed revival was released online. Klasky Csupo co-founder Gábor Csupó stated that he hoped CBS would pick it up and expressed interest in having a streaming platform pick it up if CBS passed. The theme song was met with blacklash from fans due to the use of the song supposedly using AI and finding it disrespectful towards Everett Peck as well as Frank Zappa. On July 18, 2026, Gábor uploaded a new version of the proposed updated sequence this time containing the show's original theme.

== See also ==
- Duckman: The Graphic Adventures of a Private Dick
- Squirrel Boy
