= Christopher Brown (actor) =

New Zealand actor (born 1973)

- Born: 25 February 1973 (age 53); New Zealand
- Occupation: Actor
- Years active: 1998–present

Christopher Brown (born 25 February 1973) is a New Zealand television and theatre actor. His first television role was a regular role in the New Zealand soap opera Shortland Street playing villainous Oscar Henry. He later played teacher Brent Townsend-Ross in the Network Ten sitcom Sit Down, Shut Up. He won an accolade at the 2003 New Zealand Film Awards for his main role in the 2003 film Orphans and Angels.

Brown has often concentrated on his theatre career and co-wrote his one man show titled Mr. Phase which premiered in 2002. The Green Room Awards recognised his on-stage work with a Best Supporting Actor nomination in 2003.

== Career ==
Brown studied drama at the Victorian College of the Arts and was a successful graduate. His television career began in 1998, as business manager Oscar Henry in the New Zealand soap opera Shortland Street. The character was a villain who had manipulative tendencies. Brown left the series in 1999 and his character was killed off in an explosion caused by Mackenzie Choat (Ingrid Park). In 2012, TVNZ named the character as one of Shortland Street's best ever villains.

The actor gained guest roles as Pythagoras in the Fox Kids drama Young Hercules (1999), Steve in High Flyers (1999) and Roberto Sistini in Nine Network's drama series Stingers (2000). In 2000, Brown played the "self-absorbed" Performance Arts Teacher Brent Townsend-Ross in the Network Ten sitcom Sit Down, Shut Up.

In 2002, he played the guest role of Barry Childers in an episode of the first series of Australian Broadcasting Corporation show MDA. Brown had co-wrote his own theatre play with Thomas Howie, titled Mr. Phase. The play had been in development since 2000. It was stylised as a one man show which was directed by Margaret Cameron and performed at the Melbourne International Festival in 2002.

The actor played the male lead role of John alongside actress Emmeline Hawthorne in the 2003 film Orphans and Angels. Brown won the "Special Jury Prize - Digital Feature" accolade at the 2003 New Zealand Film Awards for his role in Orphans and Angels. The actor went onto star in a stage production titled Yet Each Man Kills The Thing He Loves, for which he received a 2003 Green Room Award nomination for "Best Supporting Actor".

In 2013, Brown played the guest role of Royce in ABC's comedy It's a Date. In September 2014, Brown performed the main role in the stage production of Bent at the Theatre Works in St Kilda, Victoria. Bent focused on the Nazi persecution of gay men during World War II and were identified by a Pink triangle. Also that year he played Rick the Architect in the Nine Network crime drama Fat Tony & Co..

The actor played the supporting role of Neil Murray in the 2018 Network Ten drama series Playing for Keeps. Brown has often concentrated on theatre work and has had roles with production companies such as the Melbourne Theatre Company, Sydney Theatre Company, Malthouse Theatre and the Belvoir theatre group. The actor is also scheduled to appear in a film titled Breeding in Captivity.

== Filmography ==
Year	Title	Role	Notes
1998-1999	Shortland Street	Oscar Henry	Regular role
1999	Young Hercules	Pythagoras	Gust role
1999	High Flyers	Steve	Guest role
2000	Stingers	Roberto Sistini	Guest role
2000	Sit Down, Shut Up	Brent Townsend-Ross	Regular role
2001	Shock Jock	Nigel	Guest role
2002	MDA	Barry Childers	Guest role
2003	Blue Heelers	Jonathon Maidstone	Guest role
2003	Orphans and Angels	John	Film, Lead role
2004	Heartworm	Dave	Short film
2006	Invisible	N/A	Short film
2007	Little Deaths	Jason	Film
2008	Satisfaction	Maitre D	Guest role
2008	The Hollowmen	N/A	Guest role
2008	Long Weekend	Radio Voice	Guest role
2010	City Homicide	Leonard Besser	Guest role
2010	Rush	Stefan	Guest role
2012	Lowdown	John	Guest role
2013	It's a Date	Royce	Guest role
2013	Acts of God	Mr. Felling	Short film
2014	Fat Tony & Co.	Rick the Architect	Guest role
2014	Wing and a Prayer	Angel	Short film
2015	Stories I Want to Tell You in Person	Full Jew	TV film
2016	Kosh	Man	Short film
2018–	Playing for Keeps	Neil Murray	Recurring role
2019	Preacher	Dr. Hiatt	Guest role
2019	Utopia	Photographer	Guest role
2020	Breeding in Captivity	Owen	Film

== Awards and nominations ==
Year	Format	Association	Category	Nominated work	Result
2003	Film	2003 New Zealand Film Awards	Special Jury Prize - Digital Feature	Orphans and Angels	Won
2003	Theatre	Green Room Awards	Best Supporting Actor	Yet Each Man Kills The Thing He Loves	Nominated
