= Gene Laufenberg =

American screenwriter

Eugene Gerard "Gene" Laufenberg (born in Jersey City, New Jersey) is an American television writer, producer and director.

He started his career in television after securing a story editor's position the animated cult favorite Duckman. He was eventually nominated for an Emmy Award. Laufenberg wrote and produced various other TV shows such as Clueless, She Spies and Family Guy. After writing and directing the award-winning short Sunday's Game, Laufenberg obtained a two-picture deal with Fox 2000.

After obtaining a Masters in Clinical Psychology, Laufenberg became a licensed MFT in the state of California.

He was a writer and executive producer for season 1 of Boy Girl Dog Cat Mouse Cheese. The episode title "Greb Nefual E Neg" is "Gene Laufenberg" spelled backwards.
