= Sit Down, Shut Up (2001 TV series) =

Australian sitcom television series

- Genre: Sitcom
- Created by: Brendan Reed; Tim McLoughlan
- Starring: Marg Downey; Stephen Curry; Jacqueline Brennan; Christopher Brown
- Country of origin: Australia
- No. of seasons: 1
- No. of episodes: 13

Production
- Running time: 30 minutes

Original release
- Network: Network Ten
- Release: 16 February – 28 June 2001

Related
- Sit Down Shut Up (American series)

Sit Down, Shut Up is an Australian sitcom broadcast by Network Ten. It ran from 16 February 2001 until 28 June 2001 for a total of 13 episodes.

The series followed the staff and students at a dysfunctional fictional high school called Carpen Heights Secondary College, and focused on the life of the teachers in and out of the staff room.

A writer for the series claimed that producer/comedian Chris Lilley had borrowed ideas for characters and plots from Sit Down, Shut Up for his 2007 series Summer Heights High. The ideas Lilley reportedly borrowed included the school's name and aspects of the Mr G character.

== Cast ==
- Marg Downey as Sue Dirkin
- Stephen Curry as Stuart Mill
- Jacqueline Brennan as Helen Peters
- Christopher Brown as Brent Townsend-Ross
- Jodie Dry as Julia Denholm-Ponsford
- Paul Gleeson as Felix Sedgely
- Tayler Kane as Stefan Ravazzi
- Tim McLoughlan as Chaps
- Brendan Reed as Dean Tate
- Bernard Curry as Greg Ilyich

== American remake ==
In 2009, an animated remake of the series titled Sit Down, Shut Up aired on Fox, premiering on 19 April 2009. This American version featured the voices of Henry Winkler, Will Arnett, Jason Bateman, Will Forte, Kenan Thompson, and Cheri Oteri, Nick Kroll, and Kristin Chenoweth. It was developed by Mitchell Hurwitz, the creator of Arrested Development. Former Simpsons writer Josh Weinstein acted as showrunner. The series received lackluster reviews and was pulled from FOX's Sunday night lineup after four episodes. The program aired all of its episodes when FOX put Sit Down Shut Up on late-night Saturday. Sit Down Shut Up then aired on Comedy Central (in reruns, initially a number of times throughout the day).
