= Everett Peck =

American cartoonist (1950–2022)

- Born: Everett Lee Peck; October 9, 1950; San Diego, California, U.S.
- Died: June 14, 2022 (aged 71); Solana Beach, California, U.S.
- Occupations: Illustrator, cartoonist, animator
- Known for: Duckman; Squirrel Boy
- Spouse: Helen Vita
- Website: everettpeck.com

Everett Lee Peck (October 9, 1950 – June 14, 2022) was an American illustrator, cartoonist, and animator, best known as the creator of the animated sitcom Duckman. He also created Squirrel Boy for Cartoon Network and was a character designer for the animated series adaptation of Jumanji.

== Early life ==
Everett Lee Peck was born in San Diego, California, on October 9, 1950, and later earned a degree in illustration at California State University, Long Beach. He then took over the illustration program at the Otis College of Art and Design in 1984.

Everett Peck cited Roland Searle, Don Martin, Basil Wolverton, Virgil Partch, Carl Barks, Robert Crumb, Walt Disney, Max Fleischer, Jay Ward, Tex Avery, Bob Clampett, Chuck Jones and Frank Tashlin.

== Career ==
Peck's drawings have appeared in The New Yorker, Playboy, and Time, as well as numerous books, comics and movie posters. He participated in gallery shows in Tokyo, Los Angeles, New York City, and Washington, D.C., and wrote animated cartoons for Rugrats, The Critic, and a series based on one of his own cartoon characters: Duckman.

Originally created as a comic book that was first published by Dark Horse in 1990, Duckman was turned into an animated series in 1994 for the USA Network. During its four-season run, it won the CableACE Award, and was nominated for four Emmy Awards.

At the same time, various comic books were published by Topps Comics based on the TV series. These were largely written and drawn by others, including Jay Lynch, Scott Shaw! and Craig Yoe. Topps also reprinted Peck's original 1990 Duckman comic.

Peck also created the Cartoon Network series Squirrel Boy, which ran from 2006 to 2008.

Other work by Peck included character design for four animated TV series from Sony Pictures, Jumanji, Extreme Ghostbusters, Men in Black: The Series, and Godzilla: The Series, a slew of print ads for Nike and Honda, as well as a promotional comic strip for Pizza Hut and several station IDs for UPN. He was also an executive design consultant on Dragon Tales.

Samples of Peck's personal sketches appear in the book It's Not My Fault, a companion piece to his 2011 solo exhibition at the Oceanside Museum of Art.

== Personal life and death ==
At the time of his death, he resided in Oceanside, California, with his wife Helen Vita.

Peck died on June 14, 2022, and his death was announced two days afterwards via his Instagram page. His wife stated that he had died from a long battle with pancreatic cancer. Peck is survived by his wife, two children and a granddaughter. He was 71.
