= Peter Avanzino =

American animation director

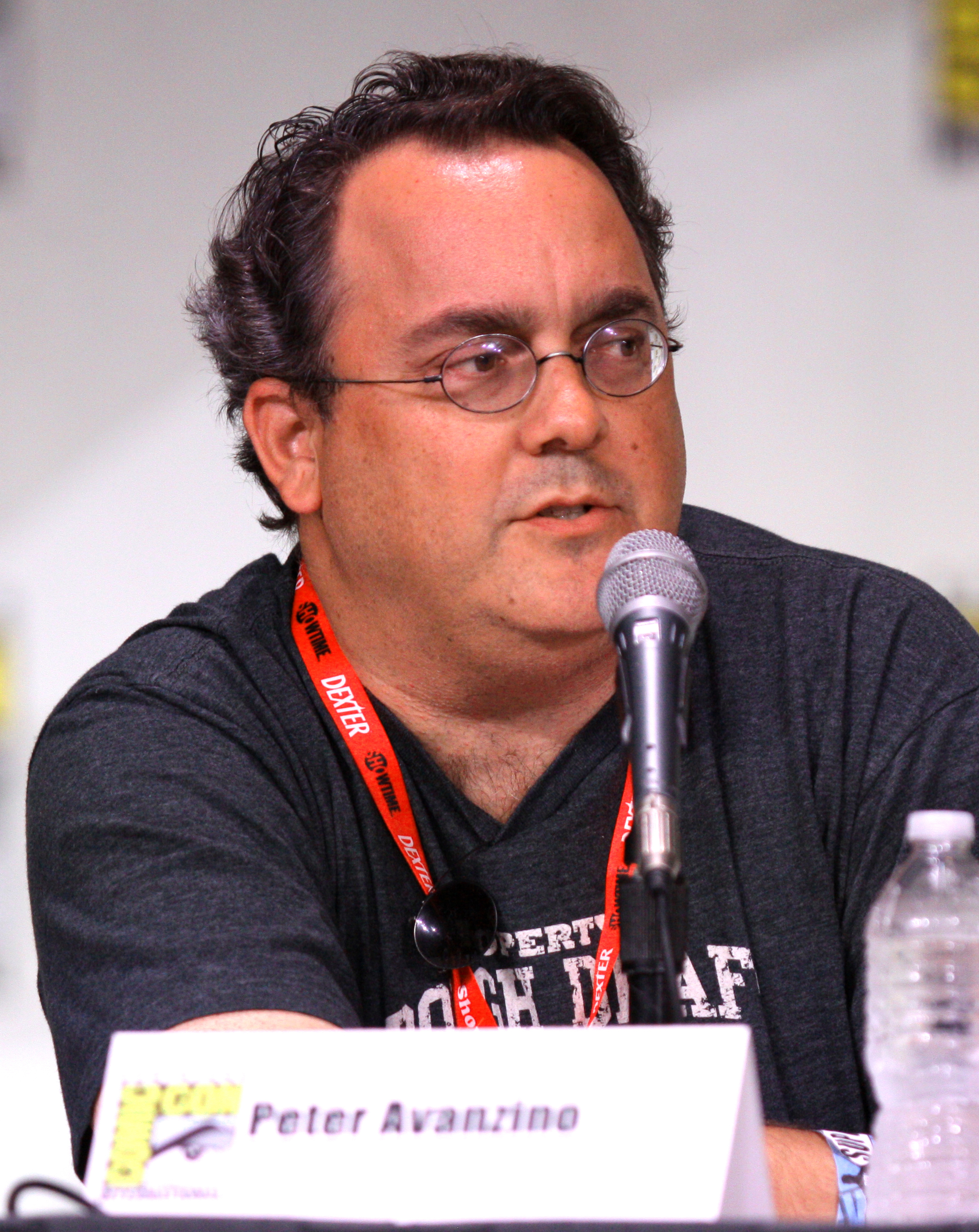
- Avanzino in July 2011
- Born: May 26, 1962 (age 64)
- Occupation: Director
- Years active: 1990-present
- Employer: Rough Draft Studios
- Website: peteravanzino.com

Peter Avanzino (born May 26, 1962) is an American animation director. He has directed several episodes of Futurama, and served as supervising director on the 6th and 7th seasons of the series. Avanzino works for Rough Draft Studios in Glendale, California. He has also directed episodes of Drawn Together, Duckman, The Wild Thornberrys, Sit Down, Shut Up, and The Ren & Stimpy Show. He was also a storyboard artist on The Ren & Stimpy Show and The Simpsons. Additionally, he directed the Christmas movie How Murray Saved Christmas. Avanzino currently resides in Los Angeles, California with his wife and kids.

== Career ==
Avanzino had wanted to be a comic book artist after graduating from high school, but instead studied architecture; he started in the animation industry at Klasky Csupo to work for the second season of The Simpsons. He would work on the series intermittently as part of Rough Draft Studios until 2004.

After Klasky Csupo had their Simpsons contract terminated by Gracie Films in favor of Film Roman, Avanzino moved to Spümcø to work for The Ren & Stimpy Show; he was one of the few hires at the studio early on during production of the second season. He served as a storyboard artist in episodes in the second season, storyboarding "Son of Stimpy"; after John Kricfalusi and Spümcø were fired for negligence, he transferred to Games Animation with his peers and directed "Stimpy's Fan Club", one of the series' most critically acclaimed episodes in place of Kricfalusi. He stayed in the series as a storyboard artist until the fourth season. He would rejoin Klasky Csupo to work on The Wild Thornberrys and Duckman before finally settling at Rough Draft Studios in 1998, having been acquainted with the studio while at Games Animation.

As part of Rough Draft Studios, he would serve as storyboard artist and later director for Futurama; he had described it as one of his favorite working experiences, continuing work on the show to this day. Aside from collaborations with 20th Television (Animation), he had also directed the first season of Clash-A-Rama!, which Rough Draft Studios produced on commission by Supercell based on their video game Clash of Clans. Owing to his connection to Matt Groening he had also worked on Disenchantment.

== Credits ==
=== Supervising Director ===
- Baby Blues (unaired second season)
- Drawn Together
- Napoleon Dynamite
- Sit Down, Shut Up (with Rich Moore)
- Futurama (seasons 6-present, season 10 with Dwayne Carey-Hill)
- Clash-a-Rama (season 1)
- Disenchantment (parts 1-4, with Dwayne Carey-Hill)

=== Director ===
- How Murray Saved Christmas (2014)

==== Sit Down, Shut Up ====
- "Helen and Sue's High School Reunion"

==== Drawn Together ====
- "Hot Tub"
- "The Other Cousin"
- "Super Nanny"
- "A Very Special Drawn Together Afterschool Special"
- "Lost in Parking Space, Part One"

==== Duckman ====
- A Room with a Bellevue
- The Once and Future Duck
- Aged Heat 2: Women in Heat
- From Brad to Worse
- Ajax and Ajaxer
- Duckman and Cornfed in 'Haunted Society Plumbers'
- My Feral Lady
- Das Sub
- Class Warfare

==== Futurama ====
- "The Series Has Landed"
- "A Flight to Remember"
- "Fear of a Bot Planet" (co-directed with Carlos Baeza, Ashley Lenz and Chris Sauvé)
- "Xmas Story"
- "Bender Gets Made"
- "Parasites Lost"
- "Insane in the Mainframe"
- "Crimes of the Hot"
- "Spanish Fry"
- Futurama: The Beast with a Billion Backs
- Futurama: Into the Wild Green Yonder
- "The Late Philip J. Fry" Which he won a Prime Time Emmy *"Primetime Emmy Award for Outstanding Animated Program (for Programming Less Than One Hour)#2010s for
- "Reincarnation"
- "The Six Million Dollar Mon"
- "Meanwhile"
- "The Impossible Stream"
- "The White Hole"

==== The Ren & Stimpy Show ====
- "Stimpy's Fan Club"

==== Disenchantment ====
- "Love's Tender Rampage"
- "Tiabeanie Falls"
