= Raymie Muzquiz =

American animation director (born 1960)

- Born: Donald Raymie Muzquiz; December 21, 1960 (age 65); San Bernardino County, California, U.S.
- Occupations: Animation director, storyboard artist, supervising producer, supervising director
- Years active: 1988–present
- Known for: Futurama; Hey Arnold! Squirrel Boy; Clarence; Duckman; Drawn Together; Sit Down, Shut Up; Hey Arnold!: The Jungle Movie

Donald Raymie Muzquiz (born December 21, 1960) is an American animation director. He has directed several episodes of Futurama, and served as supervising director on the Cartoon Network series Clarence during the first season. He has also directed episodes of Drawn Together, Duckman, Hey Arnold!, Sit Down, Shut Up, and Rugrats. He was also a storyboard artist on Futurama, Aaahh!!! Real Monsters, Despicable Me and The Simpsons. Also, he directed the television movie The Electric Piper.

== Filmography ==
=== Film ===
Year	Film	Career	Notes
1988	The Drifter	Still Photographer/Craft Service	
1998	The Rugrats Movie	Sequence Director/Supervising Animation Timing Director	
2003	Rugrats Go Wild	Sequence Director	
2010	Despicable Me	Additional Storyboard Artist	
2024	Big City Greens the Movie: Spacecation	Supervising Director	TV Movie

=== Television ===
Year	Show	Career	Notes
1990–92	The Simpsons	Storyboard Revisions/Storyboard Artist	18 episodes
1991–97	Rugrats	Storyboard Artist/Sheet Timer/Director	19 episodes
1994	Edith Ann: Homeless Go Home	Storyboard Artist/Animation Director	TV movie
1994–97	Duckman	Storyboard Artist/Animation Timer/Director	18 episodes
1994	Aaahh!!! Real Monsters	Storyboard Artist	2 episodes
2002	Hey Arnold!	Director	2 episodes
2003	The Electric Piper	Director/Voice Director	TV movie
2005–06	Drawn Together	Director	2 episodes
2006–07	Squirrel Boy	Storyboard Artist/Director/Supervising Director	52 episodes
2009	Sit Down, Shut Up	Director	2 episodes
2009–10	Dinosaur Train	Storyboard Artist	2 episodes
2010–13	Futurama	Director	8 episodes
2012	Napoleon Dynamite	Director	1 episode
2014–15	Clarence	Supervising Director/Story/Storyboard Artist	49 episodes
2017	Hey Arnold!: The Jungle Movie	Supervising Producer/Director/Additional Voice Director	TV movie
2018	Disenchantment	Main Title Design	10 episodes
2019	Apple & Onion	Supervising Director	14 episodes
