= 1950 in animation =

Events in 1950 in animation.

== Events ==
=== January ===
- January 7: Hanna-Barbera's Tom and Jerry short Little Quacker premieres, produced by MGM's Cartoon Studio. It marks the debut of Quacker the duckling.
- January 14:
  - Friz Freleng's fourth Tweety and Sylvester cartoon Home, Tweet Home premieres, produced by Warner Bros. Cartoons.
  - Hanna-Barbera's Tom and Jerry short Saturday Evening Puss premieres, produced by MGM's Cartoon Studio. Also starring Butch, Topsy, Lightning, & Mammy Two Shoes (the latter's face was briefly seen in this short).
- January 20: Jack Hannah's Lion Around, a Donald Duck cartoon produced by the Walt Disney Company, is first released. It marks the debut of Louie the Mountain Lion.
- January 21: Robert McKimson's Bugs Bunny cartoon Hurdy-Gurdy Hare premieres, produced by Warner Bros. Cartoons.
- January 28: Robert McKimson's Daffy Duck and Porky Pig cartoon Boobs in the Woods premieres, produced by Warner Bros. Cartoons.

=== February ===
- February 11: Friz Freleng's Bugs Bunny and Yosemite Sam short Mutiny on the Bunny premieres, produced by Warner Bros. Cartoons.
- February 15: Cinderella, directed by Clyde Geronimi, Hamilton Luske, & Wilfred Jackson and produced by the Walt Disney Company, premieres. The characters Jaq and Gus will later become popular comics characters.

=== March ===
- March 3:
  - Jack Kinney's The Brave Engineer, produced by the Walt Disney Company, premieres.
  - In Isadore Sparber's Quack-A-Doodle-Doo, produced by the Famous Studios, Baby Huey makes his debut.
- March 4: Chuck Jones' Daffy Duck cartoon The Scarlet Pumpernickel premieres, produced by Warner Bros. Cartoons. The short also stars Porky Pig, Melissa Duck, Sylvester, Elmer Fudd, Henery Hawk, & Mama Bear.
- March 11:
  - Hanna-Barbera's Tom and Jerry cartoon Texas Tom premieres, produced by MGM's Cartoon Studio.
  - Chuck Jones' Bugs Bunny cartoon Homeless Hare premieres, produced by Warner Bros. Cartoons.
- March 23: 22nd Academy Awards: Chuck Jones' Pepé Le Pew cartoon For Scent-imental Reasons, produced by Warner Bros. Cartoons, wins the Academy Award for Best Animated Short.

=== April ===
- April 1: Robert McKimson's Strife with Father premieres, produced by Warner Bros. Cartoons, it marks the final appearance of Beaky Buzzard in the Golden age of American animation.
- April 8: Hanna-Barbera's Tom and Jerry cartoon Jerry and the Lion premieres, produced by MGM's Cartoon Studio.
- April 22: Friz Freleng's Bugs Bunny and Yosemite Sam short Big House Bunny premieres, produced by Warner Bros. Cartoons.

=== May ===
- May 6: Robert McKimson's Foghorn Leghorn cartoon The Leghorn Blows at Midnight premieres, produced by Warner Bros. Cartoons. Also starring Henery Hawk & Barnyard Dawg.
- May 27:
  - Robert McKimson's Porky Pig cartoon An Egg Scramble premieres, produced by Warner Bros. Cartoons. This short marks the debut of the character Miss Prissy, who would go on to appear as a supporting character in McKimson's Foghorn Leghorn cartoons.
  - Tex Avery's Ventriloquist Cat premieres, produced by MGM's Cartoon Studio, starring Blackie and Spike.

=== June ===
- June 10: Tex Avery's The Cuckoo Clock premieres, produced by MGM's Cartoon Studio, starring Blackie.
- June 17: Robert McKimson's Bugs Bunny and Elmer Fudd cartoon What's Up Doc? premieres, produced by Warner Bros. Cartoons. This short was made in honor of Bugs Bunny's 10th anniversary.
- June 24: Friz Freleng's fifth Tweety and Sylvester cartoon All a Bir-r-r-d premieres, produced by Warner Bros. Cartoons.
- June 30: Jack Kinney's Goofy cartoon Motor Mania premieres, produced by Walt Disney Animation.

=== July ===
- July 1: Hanna-Barbera's Tom and Jerry cartoon Safety Second premieres, produced by MGM's Cartoon Studio and also starring Nibbles.
- July 8: Chuck Jones' Bugs Bunny cartoon 8 Ball Bunny premieres, produced by Warner Bros. Cartoons. This short marks the final appearance of Playboy Penguin in the Golden Age of Animation.

=== August ===
- August 5: Friz Freleng's Daffy Duck cartoon Golden Yeggs premieres, produced by Warner Bros. Cartoons in which Rocky the gangster makes his debut. Also starring Porky Pig.
- August 12: Robert McKimson's Bugs Bunny cartoon Hillbilly Hare premieres, produced by Warner Bros. Cartoons.

=== September ===
- September 2: Chuck Jones' Daffy Duck and Porky Pig cartoon The Ducksters premieres, produced by Warner Bros. Cartoons.
- September 16:
  - Robert McKimson's Foghorn Leghorn cartoon A Fractured Leghorn premieres, produced by Warner Bros. Cartoons. This is the first Foghorn Leghorn short where both Barnyard Dawg and Henery Hawk don't appear in.
  - Hanna-Barbera's Tom and Jerry cartoon Tom and Jerry in the Hollywood Bowl premieres, produced by MGM's Cartoon Studio.
- September 23: Friz Freleng's Bugs Bunny and Yosemite Sam cartoon Bunker Hill Bunny premieres, produced by Warner Bros. Cartoons.
- September 30: Tex Avery's Garden Gopher premieres, produced by MGM's Cartoon Studio and starring Spike.

=== October ===
- October 7: Friz Freleng's sixth Tweety and Sylvester cartoon Canary Row premieres, produced by Warner Bros. Cartoons, it marks the debut of Tweety's (and occasionally Sylvester's) owner Granny.
- October 11: Jiří Trnka's animated film Prince Bayaya premieres.
- October 21:
  - Hanna-Barbera's Tom and Jerry cartoon The Framed Cat premieres, produced by MGM's Cartoon Studio and also starring Spike & Mammy Two Shoes.
  - Friz Freleng's cartoon Stooge for a Mouse premieres, produced by Warner Bros. Cartoons. Starring Sylvester and Hector the Bulldog (named Mike in this short).
- October 28: Robert McKimson's Sylvester cartoon Pop 'Im Pop! premieres, produced by Warner Bros. Cartoons which features Sylvester trying to impress his son (Sylvester Junior in his debut appearance) by catching a giant mouse (which is actually the kangaroo Hippety Hopper).
- October 29: Hanna-Barbera's Tom and Jerry cartoon Cue Ball Cat premieres, produced by MGM's Cartoon Studio.

=== November ===
- November 2: John Hubley and Robert Cannon's Gerald McBoing-Boing, produced by UPA, premieres.
- November 3: Jack Kinney's Goofy cartoon Hold That Pose, produced by the Walt Disney Company, is first released. It marks the debut of Humphrey the Bear.
- November 4: Tex Avery's Droopy cartoon The Chump Champ premieres, produced by MGM's Cartoon Studio and also starring Spike.
- November 18: Robert McKimson's Bugs Bunny cartoon Bushy Hare premieres, produced by Warner Bros. Cartoons.

=== December ===
- December 2: Robert McKimson's Porky Pig cartoon Dog Collared premieres, produced by Warner Bros. Cartoons.
- December 9: Tex Avery's The Peachy Cobbler premieres, produced by MGM's Cartoon Studio.
- December 13: Jean Image's Jeannot l'intrépide (Johnny the Giant Killer) premieres.
- December 16: Chuck Jones' iconic Bugs Bunny and Elmer Fudd cartoon Rabbit of Seville premieres, produced by Warner Bros. Cartoons.
- December 30: Chuck Jones' Claude Cat cartoon Two's a Crowd produced by Warner Bros. Cartoons premieres, Frisky Puppy makes his debut.

== Films released ==
- February 15 - Cinderella (United States)
- February 24:
  - Always Happy (West Germany)
  - Tobias Knopp – Adventure of a Bachelor (West Germany)
- December 13 - Johnny the Giant Killer (France)
- December 18 - Once Upon A Time (Spain)

== Births ==
=== January ===
- January 4: Fakhri Odeh, Kuwaiti actor (Kuwaiti dub voice of Lepka in Future Boy Conan), (d. 2025).
- January 5: Merl Reagle, American crossword constructor (voiced himself and provided the crossword puzzles in The Simpsons episode "Homer and Lisa Exchange Cross Words"), (d. 2015).
- January 9: David Johansen, American singer, songwriter and actor (voice of Shayol in Gandahar, Beartaur in Centaurworld, Bus Driver in Cats Don't Dance, Ding Dong Daddy in the Teen Titans episode "Revved Up"), (d. 2025).
- January 16:
  - Bob Kulick, American guitarist and record producer (co-wrote the song "Sweet Victory" which was used in the SpongeBob SquarePants episode "Band Geeks"), (d. 2020).
  - Robert Schimmel, American comedian (voice of Prisoner in The Simpsons episode "Pokey Mom", himself in the Dr. Katz, Professional Therapist episode "Wild Weekend"), (d. 2010).
- January 20: Frank Mula, American television writer and producer (The Simpsons), (d. 2021).
- January 23: Richard Gilliland, American actor (voice of McHenry in Kim Possible: A Sitch in Time, Frank in the Batman: The Animated Series episode "I've Got Batman in My Basement"), (d. 2021).
- January 29: Katsuhito Akiyama, Japanese storyboard artist and director (ThunderCats, Beyblade).

=== February ===
- February 1: Adam Beckett, American animator, special effects artist and teacher (Star Wars), (d. 1979).
- February 2: Kevin Gillis, Canadian television writer and producer (creator of The Raccoons).
- February 3: Morgan Fairchild, American actress (voice of Vivienne St. Charmaine in The Simpsons episode "Podcast News", Muffy Snootwell in The Angry Beavers episode "Dumbwaiters").
- February 5: Jonathan Freeman, American actor and puppeteer (voice of Jafar in the Aladdin franchise, House of Mouse, and the Hercules episode "Hercules and the Arabian Night", Eli Excelsior Pandarus in American Dragon: Jake Long, Paimon in the Helluva Boss episode "The Circus", Satan in the Celebrity Deathmatch episode "Fandemonium III").
- February 6: Natalie Cole, American singer, songwriter, and actress (singing voice of Sawyer in Cats Don't Dance, sang "Rise and Shine" in The Care Bears Adventure in Wonderland), (d. 2015).
- February 8: Ron Husband, American animator (Walt Disney Animation Studios).
- February 12: Michael Ironside, Canadian actor (voice of Darkseid in the DC Animated Universe and Harley Quinn, Colonel Moss in Wolverine and the X-Men, Ultra Magnus in Transformers: Prime, Dark Knight Returns Batman in The New Batman Adventures episode "Legends of the Dark Knight", Dragon Scout Leader in the Jackie Chan Adventures episode "Dragon Scouts", Emperor Zanmoran in the Teenage Mutant Ninja Turtles episode "The Arena of Carnage").
- February 14: Ken Levine, American author, director, television producer and writer (The Simpsons, voice of Dan Horde in the episode "Dancin' Homer").
- February 17: Alan Burnett, American television writer and producer (Warner Bros. Animation, Hanna-Barbera, Disney Television Animation).
- February 20: Ken Shimura, Japanese comedian (voice of Master Nyada in Yo-kai Watch: The Movie, dub voice of the title character in The Lorax), (d. 2020).
- February 22: Julie Walters, English actress (voice of Miss Montague in Gnomeo & Juliet and Sherlock Gnomes, the Witch in Brave).
- February 27: Steve Waterman, American film producer (Stunt Dawgs, Mutant League, Casper, Stuart Little, Stuart Little 2, Alvin and the Chipmunks, The Voyages of Young Doctor Dolittle).

=== March ===
- March 11: Bobby McFerrin, American folk and jazz artist (Knick Knack).
- March 13: William H. Macy, American actor (voice of Leo Lionheart in The Lionhearts, Justin in The Secret of NIMH 2: Timmy to the Rescue, Aaron Herbst in the Batman Beyond episode "Disappearing Inque", himself in The Simpsons episode "Homer's Paternity Coot").
- March 14: Rick Dees, American entertainer, radio personality, comedian, actor, and voice artist (voice of D.J. in Stanley, the Ugly Duckling, Jack Dalton in the Lucky Luke episode "Ma Dalton", Rocket Rick Ragnarok in Jetsons: The Movie, Peter as Rick Dees in the Family Guy episode "La Famiglia Guy").
- March 20: William Hurt, American actor (voice of Jairus in The Miracle Maker, John Davis in The Legend of Sasquatch), (d. 2022).
- March 23: Anthony De Longis, American actor, stuntman, and choreographer (voice of Lord Zygon in Starchaser: The Legend of Orin, Klaus Furschtein in The Chipmunk Adventure).
- March 26:
  - Alan Silvestri, American composer and conductor (Who Framed Roger Rabbit, FernGully: The Last Rainforest, Stuart Little, Lilo & Stitch, Stuart Little 2, The Polar Express, The Wild, Beowulf, A Christmas Carol, The Croods).
  - Martin Short, Canadian-American actor and comedian (voice of Ed Grimley in The Completely Mental Misadventures of Ed Grimley, Stubbs the Clown in We're Back! A Dinosaur's Story, Hubie in The Pebble and the Penguin, Huy in The Prince of Egypt, Ooblar in Jimmy Neutron: Boy Genius, B.E.N. in Treasure Planet, the title character in The Cat in the Hat Knows a Lot About That!, Stefano in Madagascar 3: Europe's Most Wanted).
- March 31:
  - Robbie Coltrane, Scottish actor and comedian (voice of Mr. Hyde in Van Helsing: The London Assignment, Gregory in The Tale of Despereaux, the title character in The Gruffalo and The Gruffalo's Child, Lead Elf in Arthur Christmas, Lord Dingwall in Brave), (d. 2022).
  - Yoshifumi Kondō, Japanese animator (Studio Ghibli) and director (Whisper of the Heart), (d. 1998).

=== April ===
- April 8: Carmen Twillie, American actress and singer (sang "Circle of Life" in The Lion King, singing voice of Stormella in Rudolph the Red-Nosed Reindeer: The Movie, voice of Undersea Gal and Man Under the Stairs in The Nightmare Before Christmas, Singing Bean in the Chowder episode "The Sing Beans", additional voices in Hammerman).
- April 12: David Cassidy, American actor and singer (voice of Roland Pond in the Kim Possible episode "Oh Boyz"), (d. 2017).
- April 13: Ron Perlman, American actor (voice of Slade in Teen Titans and Justice League: The Flashpoint Paradox, Clayface in the DC Animated Universe, Jax-Ur in Superman: The Animated Series, Orion in Justice League and Justice League Unlimited, Bane and Killer Croc in The Batman, Hellboy in Hellboy: Sword of Storms and Hellboy: Blood and Iron, Mr. Lancer in Danny Phantom, Gha Nachkt in Star Wars: The Clone Wars, the Lich in Adventure Time, the Stabbington Brothers in the Tangled franchise, Hulk in Iron Man and Fantastic Four, Drekk in the Men in Black: The Series episode "The Dog Eat Dog Syndrome", Sinestro in the Green Lantern: The Animated Series episode "Prisoner of Sinestro", Warhawk in the Kim Possible episode "Graduation", Firelord Sozin in Avatar: The Last Airbender episode "The Avatar and the Fire Lord", Dr. Koenig in the Static Shock episode "The Parent Trap").
- April 22: Peter Frampton, English guitarist, singer and songwriter (voiced himself in The Simpsons episode "Homerpalooza", and the Family Guy episode "Death Lives").
- April 27: Randy Fullmer, American animator and producer (The Walt Disney Company), (d. 2023).
- April 28:
  - Jay Leno, American television host, comedian, and writer (voice of Vorb in We're Back! A Dinosaur's Story, Fire Hydrant in Robots, Jay Limo in Cars, Fast Tony in Ice Age: The Meltdown, Jack O'Lantern in Scooby-Doo and the Goblin King, King Malbert in Igor, Murray Hare in Unstable Fables: Tortoise vs. Hare, Crimson Chin and Nega-Chin in The Fairly OddParents, Billy Beagle in Mickey Mouse Mixed-Up Adventures, Colonel Contraction in the Phineas and Ferb episode "Phineas and Ferb Save Summer", Hank Featherbee in the T.O.T.S. episode "Grandpa's Great Adventure", Jay Frog in the Happily Ever After: Fairy Tales for Every Child episode "The Frog Prince", Mr. Kitty in the South Park episode "Cartman's Mom Is a Dirty Slut", himself in The Simpsons, Family Guy, and Dilbert).
  - Kristin Laskas Martin, American television writer and producer (The Magic School Bus, Cyberchase).

=== May ===
- May 12:
  - Bruce Boxleitner, American actor and writer (voice of Tron in Tron: Uprising, Colin Barrow in Dead Space: Downfall, John Sheridan in Babylon 5: The Road Home, himself in the American Dad episode "Tears of a Clooney").
  - Gabriel Byrne, Irish actor (voice of Sir Lionel in Quest for Camelot, Horse in The Boy, the Mole, the Fox and the Horse).
- May 17: Howard Ashman, American playwright and lyricist (Walt Disney Animation Studios), (d. 1991).
- May 18: Mark Mothersbaugh, American musician and member of Devo (The Harper House, Klasky Csupo, The Mr. Potato Head Show, The Adventures of Rocky and Bullwinkle, Clifford the Big Red Dog, Cartoon Network Studios, Gary the Rat, Popeye's Voyage: The Quest for Pappy, Shorty McShorts' Shorts, Mater's Tall Tales, Sony Pictures Animation, Happiness Is a Warm Blanket, Charlie Brown, Toy Story Toons: Hawaiian Vacation, Alvin and the Chipmunks, Warner Animation Group, Ice Age: The Great Egg-Scapade, Bordertown, Lost in Oz, Disenchantment, Motown Magic, The Willoughbys, The Croods: A New Age, America: The Motion Picture, Hoppers, composed and performed the theme song for Shaggy & Scooby-Doo Get a Clue!, voice of Reptar, Jingle Singer and Phonograph Singer in Rugrats, himself in the Futurama episode "The Mutants Are Revolting").
- May 24: Terry Scott Taylor, American songwriter, record producer, songwriter and composer (Catscratch, Random! Cartoons, VeggieTales, Project G.e.e.K.e.R.).
- May 28: Denny Delk, American actor (voice of Wicket W. Warrick in season 2 of Ewoks, Reaper in Spiral Zone).
- May 31: Jean Chalopin, French screenwriter and producer (founder of DIC Entertainment).

=== June ===
- June 11: Pedro Bell, American illustrator, animator and comics artist, (d. 2019).
- June 12: Sonia Manzano, American actress, screenwriter, author, speaker and singer-songwriter (portrayed Maria in Sesame Street, wrote for Little Bill, voice of Rosa Casagrande in The Loud House and The Casagrandes, creator of Alma's Way).
- June 15: Dale Baer, American animator (Walt Disney Animation Studios, The Lord of the Rings, Peanuts specials, Rover Dangerfield, Tom and Jerry: The Movie, Quest for Camelot, Eric Goldberg couch gag in The Simpsons episode "Fland Canyon", Tom and Jerry: Willy Wonka and the Chocolate Factory) and storyboard artist (Hanna-Barbera, Mother Goose and Grimm, Animaniacs, The King and I), (d. 2021).
- June 17: Tom Shannon, American animator (Filmation, The Super Mario Bros. Super Show!, Walt Disney Animation Studios), (d. 2021).
- June 18: Arnold Leibovit, American director, producer, and screenwriter (The Puppetoon Movie).
- June 19: Vladimir Vyshegorodtsev, Russian animator (Soyuzmultfilm, Shakespeare: The Animated Tales, Varga Studio, Dobrinya and the Dragon), (d. 2022).
- June 21: Joey Kramer, American drummer and member of Aerosmith (voiced himself in The Simpsons episodes "Flaming Moe's" and "The Ned-Liest Catch").
- June 26: Michael Paul Chan, American actor (voice of Jimmy Ho in The PJs, Mr. Kim in the Static Shock episode "Tantrum", Chinese Agent in The Simpsons episode "Homer the Father").

=== July ===
- July 5: Huey Lewis, American actor (voice of Bulworth in Puppy Dog Pals, Guy who looks like Huey Lewis in The Cleveland Show episode "Die Semi-Hard"), and former singer-songwriter (sang "Once Upon a Time in New York City" in Oliver & Company).
- July 11: Bruce McGill, American actor (voice of Lloyd Waterman in The Cleveland Show, General McCormick in the Justice League episode "Eclipsed", Santa Claus and John Williams in the Family Guy episodes "Road to the North Pole" and "It's a Trap!").
- July 19: Simon Cadell, English actor (voice of Blackberry in Watership Down), (d. 1996).
- July 23: Ferenc Varsányi, Hungarian animator and overseas supervisor (Rugrats, Aaahh!!! Real Monsters).
- July 28: Lani Minella, American actress (voice of Ginger in The Queen's Corgi, Central City Mayor in the Justice League Unlimited episode "Flash and Substance", additional voices in FernGully: The Last Rainforest).

=== August ===
- August 3: Jo Marie Payton, American actress and singer (voice of Suga Mama Proud in The Proud Family franchise).
- August 6: Dorian Harewood, American actor (voice of Shredder in Teenage Mutant Ninja Turtles, Dr. Tenma in Astro Boy, Martian Manhunter in The Batman, War Machine in Iron Man and The Incredible Hulk, Monstar Bupkus in Space Jam, Lieutenant Artie King in Freakazoid!, Tombstone in Spider-Man, Dr. Bromwell in The Spectacular Spider-Man, Mar Londo in the Legion of Super Heroes episode "Cry Wolf", Jim Tate/Armory in Batman Beyond).
- August 11: Bob Mothersbaugh, American singer, songwriter, musician, composer and member of Devo (Klasky Csupo, The Groovenians, Beat Bugs, Motown Magic).
- August 13: Jane Carr, English actress (voice of Pud'n in The Grim Adventures of Billy and Mandy, Mama Cosma in The Fairly OddParents, Grandma Winifred Fletcher in Phineas and Ferb, Dan and Ann Chovie in Fish Hooks, Mrs. Dunwitty in Treasure Planet).
- August 21: Jessie Jones, American actress and screenwriter (Teacher's Pet), (d. 2026).
- August 24: Ami Mandelman, Israeli actor (dub voice of Dr. Sweet in Atlantis: The Lost Empire, Ozai in Avatar: The Last Airbender, Doug Dimmadome and Crimson Chin in The Fairly OddParents, Bloo in Foster's Home for Imaginary Friends, Goliath in Gargoyles, Master Wu and Garmadon in Ninjago, Pumbaa in The Lion King franchise, Professor Utonium in The Powerpuff Girls, Mr. Krabs in SpongeBob SquarePants, Slade in Teen Titans, B'wana Beast, Kilowog, and Etrigan in Batman: The Brave and the Bold).
- August 27: Charles Fleischer, American comedian and actor (voice of Roger Rabbit in the Who Framed Roger Rabbit franchise and Chip 'n Dale: Rescue Rangers, Benny the Cab, Greasy and Psycho in Who Framed Roger Rabbit, Dweeb in We're Back! A Dinosaur's Story, Boris in Balto II, Monumentus in Buzz Lightyear of Star Command, Elbows in Rango, Elf General in The Polar Express).
- August 30: Robert Sahakyants, Armenian animator and film director (The Lesson), (d. 2009).
- August 31: Daria Paris, American production assistant (The Simpsons), (d. 2010).

=== September ===
- September 1: Phil McGraw, American television personality and author (voiced himself in The Simpsons episode "Treehouse of Horror XVII").
- September 7: Julie Kavner, American actress (voice of Marge Simpson and Patty and Selma in The Simpsons, Ma in The Lion King 1½).
- September 10: Joe Perry, American musician and member of Aerosmith (voiced himself in The Simpsons episode "Flaming Moe's").
- September 14:
  - Michael Reaves, American television writer (Gargoyles, Batman: The Animated Series, The Smurfs, Teenage Mutant Ninja Turtles, The Real Ghostbusters, My Little Pony, Fox's Peter Pan & the Pirates, Spider-Man Unlimited), (d. 2023).
  - Dennis Predovic, American actor (voice of Head and Metal Man in Gandahar, Béla Károlyi and Karl Rove in the American Dad! episode "Deacon Stan, Jesus Man", additional voices in Courage the Cowardly Dog).
- September 21: Bill Murray, American actor and comedian (portrayed himself in Space Jam and Frank Detorre in Osmosis Jones, voice of Reporter in Tarzoon: Shame of the Jungle, Dragon in B.C. Rock, Garfield in Garfield: The Movie and Garfield: A Tail of Two Kitties, Clive Badger in Fantastic Mr. Fox, Baloo in The Jungle Book, Boss in Isle of Dogs).
- September 27: Cary-Hiroyuki Tagawa, Japanese-American actor (voice of Brushogun in Teen Titans: Trouble in Tokyo, Hashi in Kubo and the Two Strings, Sumo Kuma in Teenage Mutant Ninja Turtles, Alrich Wren in Star Wars: Rebels, Master Eiji in Blue Samurai, Akita in the DuckTales episode "Astro B.O.Y.D.!"), (d. 2025).

=== October ===
- October 1: Randy Quaid, American actor (portrayed Cappy von Trapment in The Adventures of Rocky and Bullwinkle, voice of Alameda Slim in Home on the Range, Rockin' Rory in Stanley's Dinosaur Round-Up, Colonel Sanders in KFC ads, Anthony's Dad in The Ren & Stimpy Show episode "A Visit to Anthony").
- October 4: Alan Rosenberg, American actor (voice of Jack Hammer in Robots, Mr. Dreidel in the Rugrats episode "Chanukah", Dr. Bob in the Duckman episode "How to Suck in Business Without Really Trying", Boreas in the Hercules episode "Hercules and the Spartan Experience", Lawyer in the American Dad! episode "Live and Let Fry").
- October 9: Everett Peck, American animator (creator of Duckman and Squirrel Boy), character designer (The Real Ghostbusters, The Critic, Adelaide Productions), art director (Sammy) and writer (Rugrats), (d. 2022).
- October 10: Jerry Tondo, Japanese-American actor (voice of Chien-Po in Mulan and Mulan II, Talu Mizuki in The Secret Saturdays).
- October 13: Hugues Le Bars, French composer (Oggy and the Cockroaches), (d. 2014).
- October 20: Tom Petty, American musician and actor (voice of Lucky and Mud Dobber in King of the Hill, himself in The Simpsons episode "How I Spent My Strummer Vacation"), (d. 2017).
- October 22: Patricia Parris, American actress (voice of Shelly in Jabberjaw, Cindy Mae and Rita in Yogi's Space Race and Buford and the Galloping Ghost, Mrs. Hudson in Sherlock Hound, Pammy Panda in Shirt Tales, Helen Little in The Littles, Acorn in The Smurfs, Daisy Duck in Mickey's Christmas Carol, Kanga and Christopher Robin's mother in The New Adventures of Winnie the Pooh).
- October 25: Mark L. Taylor, American actor (voice of Firestorm in Super Friends, Charlie Schumaker in The Mask: Animated Series, Jimmy Olsen in Superman, Farmer McGint in The Rocketeer, McWhirter in the Batman: The Animated Series episode "The Cape and Cowl Conspiracy").
- October 26: Dan Gilvezan, American actor (voice of Spider-Man in Spider-Man and His Amazing Friends, Bumblebee in The Transformers, Cooler in Pound Puppies).
- October 31: John Candy, Canadian comedian and actor (voice of Den, Dan, Desk Sergeant and Robot in Heavy Metal, Wilbur in The Rescuers Down Under, himself in Camp Candy), (d. 1994).

=== November ===
- November 4: Boyd Kirkland, American television director (Batman: The Animated Series, X-Men: Evolution, The Avengers: Earth's Mightiest Heroes), (d. 2011).
- November 7: Janno Põldma, Estonian film director and children's writer (Ladybirds' Christmas, Lotte from Gadgetville, Lotte and the Moonstone Secret, Lotte and the Lost Dragons).
- November 8: Mary Hart, American television personality and actress (voice of Mary Hartstone in Hollyrock-a-Bye Baby, Yolkian Reporter in Jimmy Neutron: Boy Genius, Fairy Hart in The Fairly OddParents, EntertainMutt Tonight Host in Marmaduke, Lucy Goosey in the Happily Ever After: Fairy Tales for Every Child episode "Henny Penny", More! Host in the Fillmore! episode "Nappers Never Sleep", herself in the Family Guy episode "It's a Trap!").
- November 18: Dennis Haskins, American actor (voice of Mr. Belding and Jigsaw in the Robot Chicken episode "Boo Cocky"), (d. 2026).
- November 22: Jim Lang, American composer (Hey Arnold!, Lloyd in Space, Unstable Fables, Dinosaur Train, Ready Jet Go!).
- November 25: Bill Kroyer, American animator (Animalympics, Tron, Starchaser: The Legend of Orin, Technological Threat, Jetsons: The Movie, Rhythm and Hues Studios, animated the main titles for National Lampoon's Christmas Vacation and Troop Beverly Hills), storyboard artist (Tron, Heathcliff, Challenge of the GoBots, Heathcliff: The Movie), writer, producer (Technological Threat, Computer Warriors, Click and Clack's As the Wrench Turns) and director (Technological Threat, Computer Warriors, FernGully: The Last Rainforest, co-founder of Kroyer Films).
- November 26: Neil Dickson, English actor (voice of Dreadknight in Iron Man, Prince Duncan and Griff in Gargoyles, Alien Leader in the What a Cartoon! episode "Gramps", Captain Warlock in the Megas XLR episode "Space Booty").

=== December ===
- December 5: Nick Jameson, American actor, musician, and producer (voice of Sheriff Lewis in Clifford the Big Red Dog, Morbius and Richard Fisk in Spider-Man, Palpatine in Star Wars: Clone Wars, Stan Merkel in Batman: Year One).
- December 6: Joe Hisaishi, Japanese composer, musical director, conductor and pianist (Studio Ghibli).
- December 10: Gregg Berger, American actor (voice of Odie in the Garfield franchise, Grimlock in the Transformers franchise, the Gromble in Aaahh!!! Real Monsters, Cornfed Pig in Duckman, Mysterio and Kraven the Hunter in Spider-Man, Absorbing Man in Avengers Assemble and Spider-Man, General Kalani in Star Wars: The Clone Wars and Star Wars Rebels, Agent Kay in Men in Black: The Series, Mole Man in Fantastic Four, Meriwether Lewis and William Clark in the Time Squad episode "Lewis and Clark and Larry").
- December 11: Alexander Tatarsky, Russian film director, animator, and producer (Plasticine Crow, Good Night, Little Ones!, Investigation Held by Kolobki, Turn off the Light!), (d. 2007).
- December 12: Darleen Carr, American actress and singer (voice of Shanti in The Jungle Book, Margo in The Greatest Adventure: Stories from the Bible, Abby and President Stasny in The Real Adventures of Jonny Quest, Helen in The Secret of NIMH 2: Timmy to the Rescue).
- December 13: Wendie Malick, American actress (voice of Eda Clawthorne in The Owl House, Beatrice Horseman in BoJack Horseman, Chica in The Emperor's New Groove franchise, Principal Folsom in Fillmore!, Beautiful Gorgeous in The Adventures of Jimmy Neutron: Boy Genius, Victoria in Father of the Pride, Mrs. X in The X's, Burdine Maxwell in season 1 of Bratz, Dr. Price in the Batman Beyond episode "Joyride", Dr. Karen Roberts/Omnara in the Static Shock episode "Kidnapped").
- December 18: Leonard Maltin, American film critic and historian (voiced himself in the BoJack Horseman episode "Brrap Brrap Pew Pew" and the Freakazoid! episode "Island of Dr. Mystico").
- December 21: Jeffrey Katzenberg, American film producer and media proprietor (Walt Disney Animation Studios, co-founder of DreamWorks Animation).
- December 29: Jon Polito, American actor (voice of Arnook in Avatar: The Last Airbender, Don Baffi in El Tigre: The Adventures of Manny Rivera, Commissioner Loeb in Batman: Year One, Hammerhead in the Ultimate Spider-Man episode "Return to the Spider-Verse: Part III", Griffin of Pittsford in the Rapunzel's Tangled Adventure episode "Not in the Mood", Funjil in the Chowder episode "The Moldy Touch", Sir Cranklin in the Robot and Monster episode "First Impressions", Al Capone in the Time Squad episode "The Clownfather", Mizaru in the Ben 10: Ultimate Alien episode "Simian Says"), (d. 2016).

=== Specific date unknown ===
- Jackie Cockle, English animator (Cosgrove Hall Films, co-founder of Hot Animation).
- Calvin Remsberg, American actor and stage director (voice of Merry Man in Shrek), (d. 2022).
- Larry Cuba, American computer-animation artist (Star Wars).
- Jan Strnad, American writer (Disney Television Animation).

== Deaths ==
=== March ===
- March 26: Dink Trout, American actor, voice artist and radio personality (voice of the title character in Bootle Beetle, Old Bootle Beetle and Balsam in Morris the Midget Moose, the King of Hearts in Alice in Wonderland), dies at age 51.

=== September ===
- September 2: Frank Graham, American radio presenter and actor (voice of the Big Bad Wolf in Droopy, the Mouse in Slap Happy Lion and King-Size Canary, the title characters in The Fox and the Crow, the Lion in Jerry and the Lion, narrator in Chicken Little and The Three Caballeros), dies at age 35.
- September 26: Mario Gallina, Italian actor (Italian voice of J. Worthington Foulfellow in Pinocchio, the Ringmaster in Dumbo), dies at age 61.

=== December ===
- December 21: Earl Duvall, American animator, writer, lay-out artist, director and comics artist (Walt Disney Company, Warner Bros. Cartoons, Ub Iwerks, directed Honey Moon Hotel), dies at age 52.

== See also ==
- List of anime by release date (1946–1959)
