= Hovhannes Tumanyan =

Armenian author, poet, novelist, and public activist (1869–1923)

Hovhannes Tumanyan Հովհաննես Թումանյան
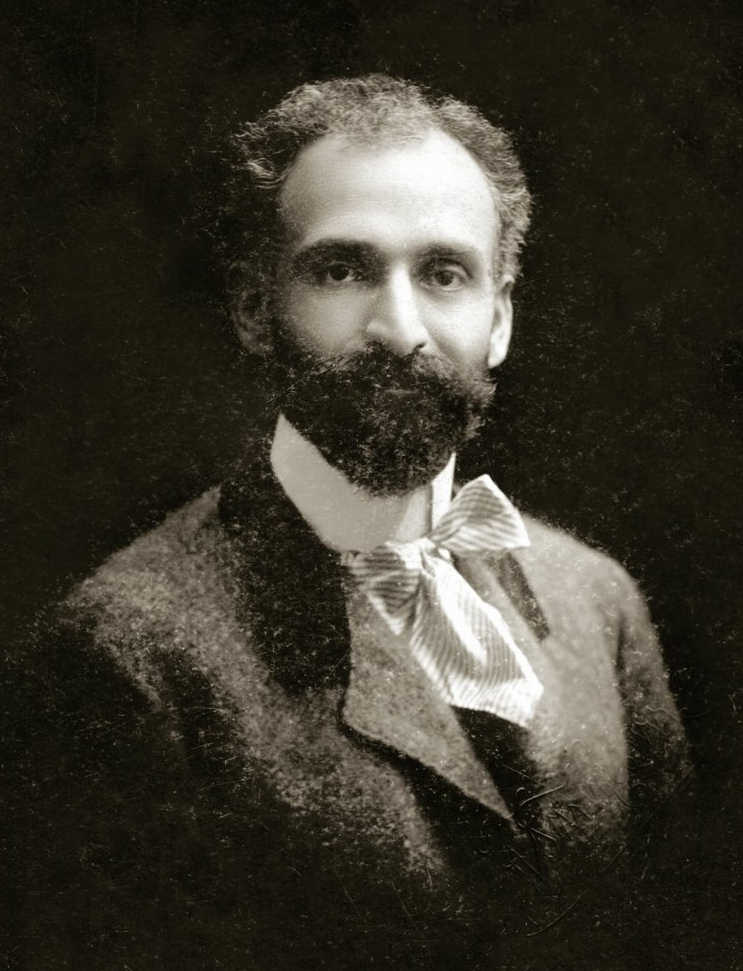
- Born: February 19, 1869; Dsegh, Tiflis Governorate, Russian Empire (now Lori Province, Armenia)
- Died: March 23, 1923 (aged 54); Moscow, Russian SFSR, Soviet Union
- Resting place: Armenian Pantheon of Tbilisi
- Occupations: poet, novelist, public activist
- Spouse: Olga Tumanyan (née Matchkalyan)
- Children: 10, including Tamar Tumanyan
- Writing career
- Period: 1881–1923
- Movement: Realism

Signature
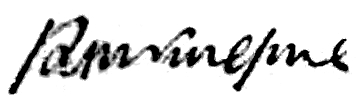

Hovhannes Tumanyan (Armenian: Հովհաննես Թումանյան, classical spelling: Յովհաննէս Թումանեան, 19 February [O.S. 7 February] 1869 – March 23, 1923) was an Armenian poet, writer, translator, and literary and public activist. He is the national poet of Armenia.

Tumanyan wrote poems, quatrains, ballads, novels, fables, and critical and journalistic articles. His works were mostly written in the style of realism, frequently revolving around the everyday life of his time. Born in the historical village of Dsegh in the Lori region, at a young age Tumanyan moved to Tiflis, which was the centre of Armenian culture under the Russian Empire during the 19th and early 20th centuries. He soon became known to the wide Armenian society for his simple but very poetic works.

Many films and animated films have been adapted from Tumanyan's works. Two operas, Anush (1912) by Armen Tigranian and Almast (1930) by Alexander Spendiaryan, were written based on his works.

== Biography ==
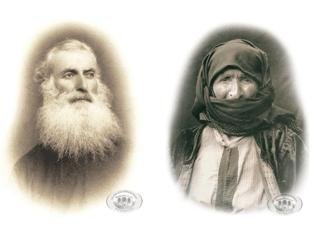
Tumanyan's parents

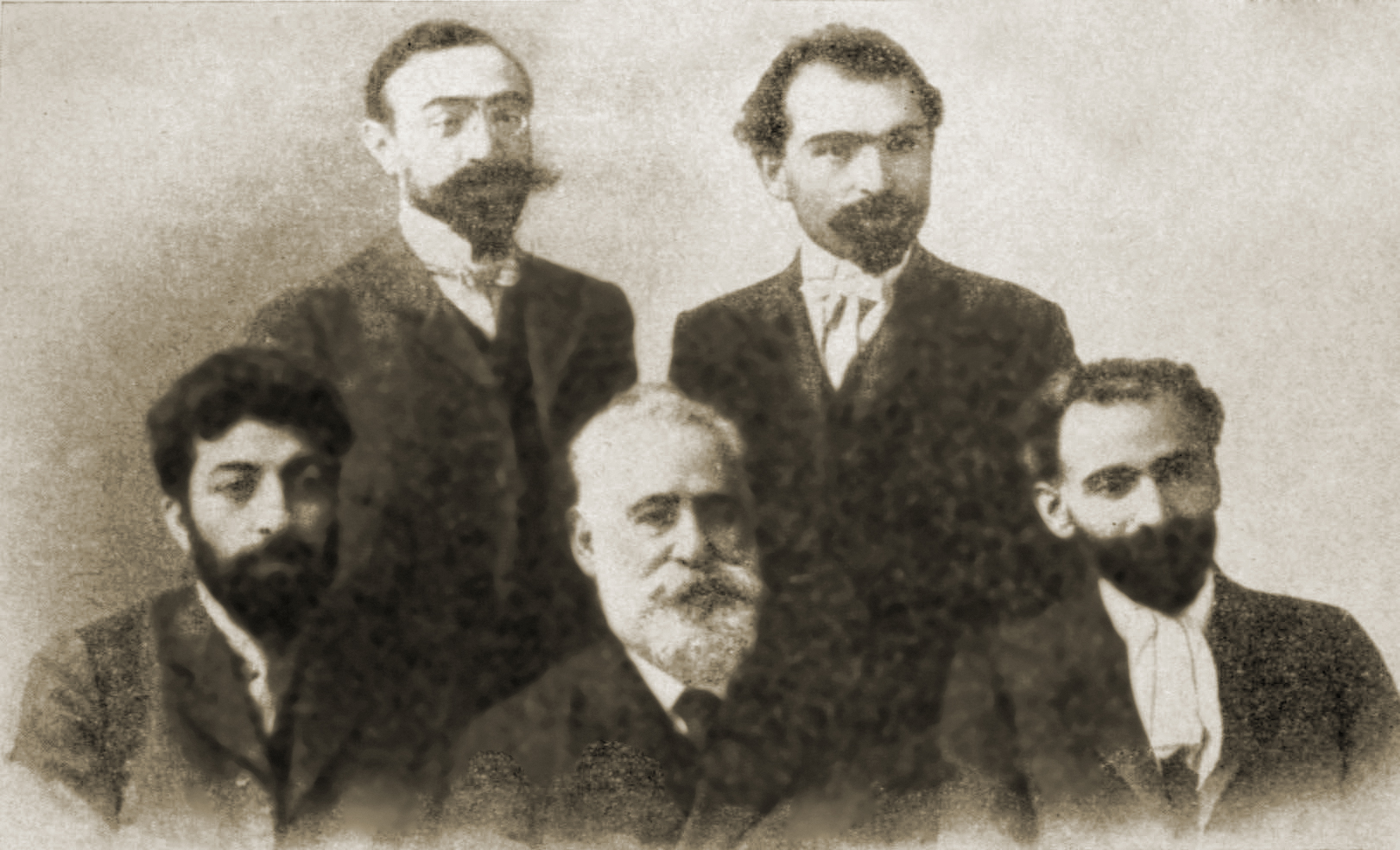
Vernatun members in 1903. Isahakyan, Aghayan, Tumanyan (sitting) and Shant, Demirchian (standing).

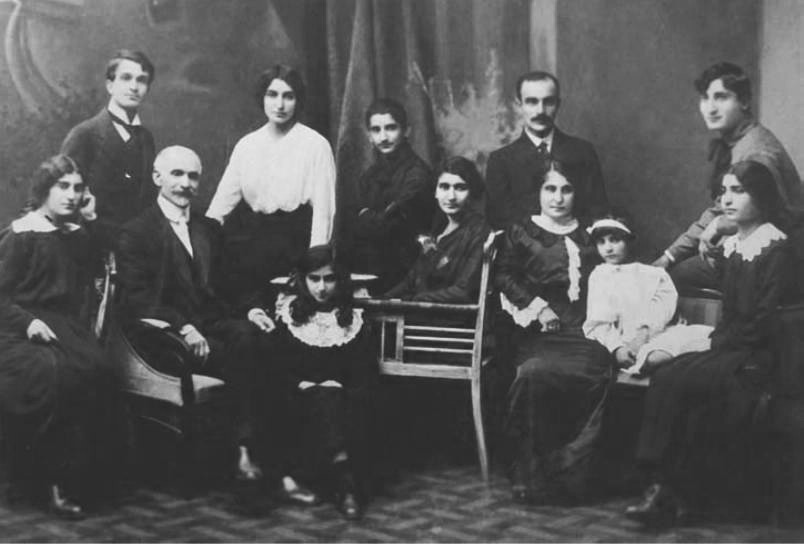
The Tumanyan family

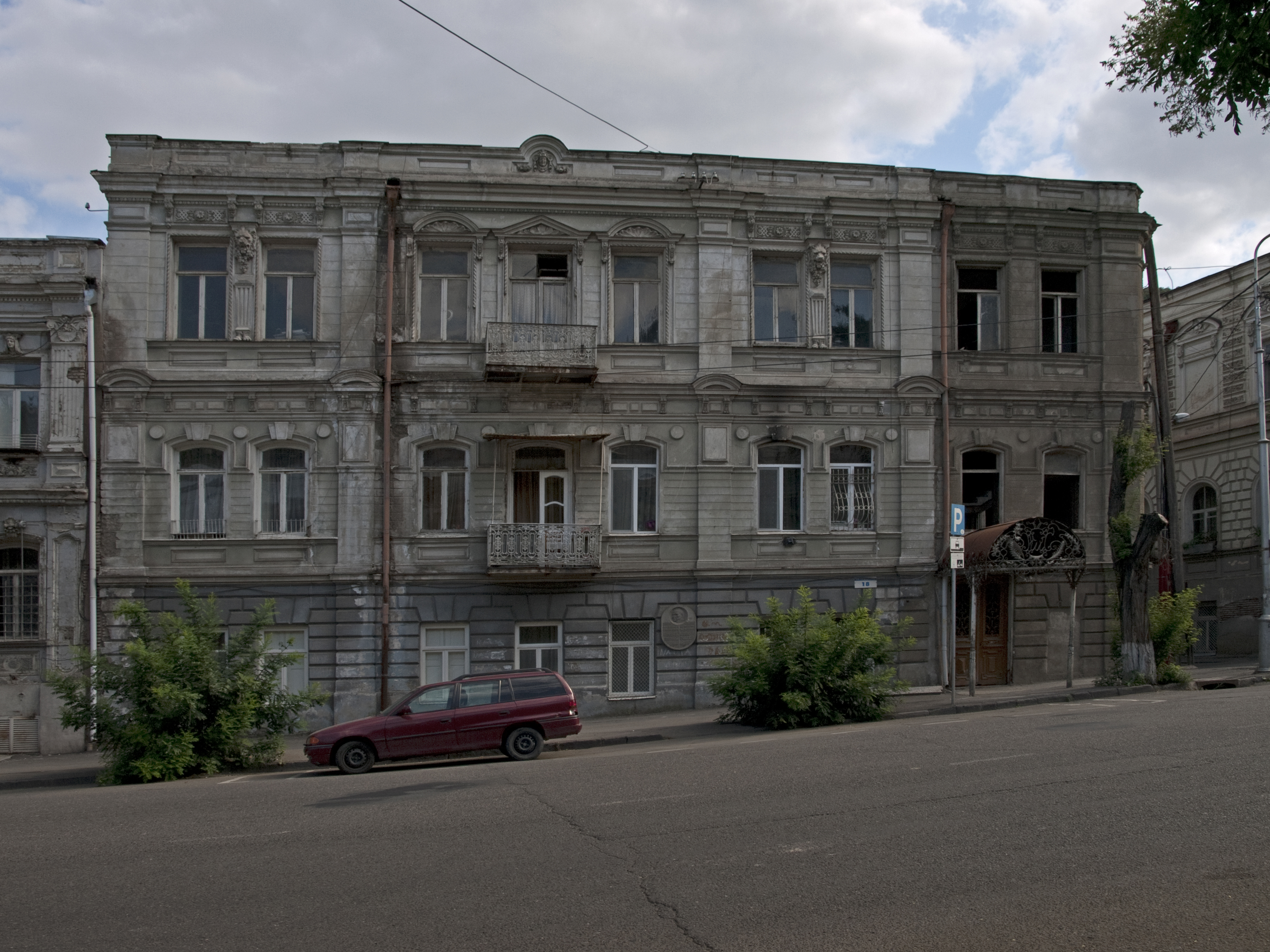
The house where Tumanyan lived in Tiflis

Tumanyan was born on February 19, 1869, in the village of Dsegh, Tiflis Governorate, Russian Empire (now in Lori Province, Armenia).

His father, Aslan (1839–1898), was the village priest known as Ter-Tadevos. He was an offspring of an Armenian princely family of Tumanyan, branch of the famous royal house of Mamikonian that settled in Lori in 10th and 11th centuries from their original feudal fief of Taron.

His mother, Sona (1842–1936), was an avid storyteller with a particular interest in fables. Young Tumanyan was the oldest of eight children; his siblings were Rostom (1871–1915), Osan (1874–1926), Iskuhi (1878–1943), Vahan (1881–1937), Astghik (1885–1953), Arshavir (1888–1921), Artashes (1892–1916).

From 1877 to 1879, Tumanyan attended the parochial school of Dsegh. From 1879 to 1883 he went to a school in Jalaloghly. Tumanyan moved to Tiflis in 1883, where he attended the Nersisyan School from 1883 to 1887. Tumanyan's wrote his first poem at the age of 12, while studying in Jalaloghly school. He lived at the teacher's house for a while and fell in love with the teacher's daughter Vergine. Since 1893, Tumanyan worked for Aghbyur, Murtch, Hasker and Horizon periodicals and also was engaged in public activism.

In 1899, Tumanyan came up with an idea of organizing meetings of Armenian intellectuals of the time at his house on 44 Bebutov Street in Tiflis (present-day Amaghleba 18, in Sololaki). Soon it became an influential literary group, which often gathered in the garret of Tumanyan's house. Vernatun means garret in Armenian, which was the name the group was referred to. Prominent members of the collective were Avetik Isahakyan, Derenik Demirchyan, Levon Shant, Ghazaros Aghayan, Perch Proshyan, Nikol Aghbalian, Alexander Shirvanzade, Nar-Dos, Vrtanes Papazyan, Vahan Terian, Leo, Stepan Lisitsyan, Mariam Tumanyan, Gevorg Bashinjagyan and many other significant Armenian figures of early 20th century. With some pauses, it existed until 1908.

In 1912 Tumanyan was elected the president of the Company of Caucasus Armenian Writers.

In the fall of 1921, Tumanyan went to Constantinople to find support of Armenian refugees. After months spent there, he returned ill. After surgery in 1922, he started to get better. But in September, Tumanyan's disease started to progress again. He was transferred to a hospital in Moscow, where he died on March 23, 1923.

=== Personal life ===
In 1888, at the age of 19, Tumanyan married Olga Matchkalyan, age 17. They had 10 children: Musegh (1889–1938), Ashkhen (1891–1968), Nvard (1892–1957), Artavazd (1894–1918), Hamlik (1896–1937), Anush (1898–1927), Arpik (1899–1981), Areg (1900–1939), Seda (1905–1988), Tamar (1907–1989).

== Political and public activism ==
During the government-provoked Armenian–Tatar massacres of 1905–1906, Tumanyan took the role of a peacemaker, for which he was arrested twice. Tumanyan also deeply criticized the Georgian–Armenian War of 1918. Tumanyan was also actively engaged in preaching the Gospel. As he put in one of his verses, "There is only one way of salvation; through Jesus Christ abiding inside every one of us".

In October 1914 Tumanyan joined the "Committee for Support of War Victims", which later helped Armenian Genocide refugees settled in Etchmiadzin.

In 1921 in Tiflis he founded the House of Armenian Art.

== Literary work ==
Eduard Jrbashyan describes Tumanyan's language as "simple, natural and at the same time poetically inspired and beautiful." Many expressions from Tumanyan's works have become common phrases and sayings in Armenian.

Tumanyan is usually regarded in Armenian circles as "All-Armenian poet". He earned this title when the Catholicos of Armenia had ordered that Armenian refugees from the west not enter certain areas of his church and house, since he is considered to be "The Catholicos of all Armenians". Tumanyan in response decried that decision claiming that the refugees could seek relief in the Catholicos' quarters under order of "The Poet of all Armenians".

He created lyrics, fables, epic poems and translations into Armenian of Byron, Goethe and Pushkin.

Tumanyan's most famous works include:

=== Ballads and poems ===
- Shunn u katun (The dog and the cat, 1886)
- Maro (1887)
- Anush (1890)
- Akht’amar (1891)
- Sasunts’i Davit’ (David of Sassoun, 1902)
- T’mkaberdi ar’umë (The capture of Tmkaberd, 1902)
- Mi kat’il meghr (A drop of honey, 1909)
- Ch’ari verje (The end of evil, 1908)
- T’agavorn u ch’arch’in (The king and the peddler, 1917)

=== Short stories ===
- "Gik’or"

=== Fairy tales ===
- K’aj Nazar (Nazar the Brave)
- Ulikë (The kid goat)
- Dzakhord P’anos (Unlucky Panos)

== Legacy ==
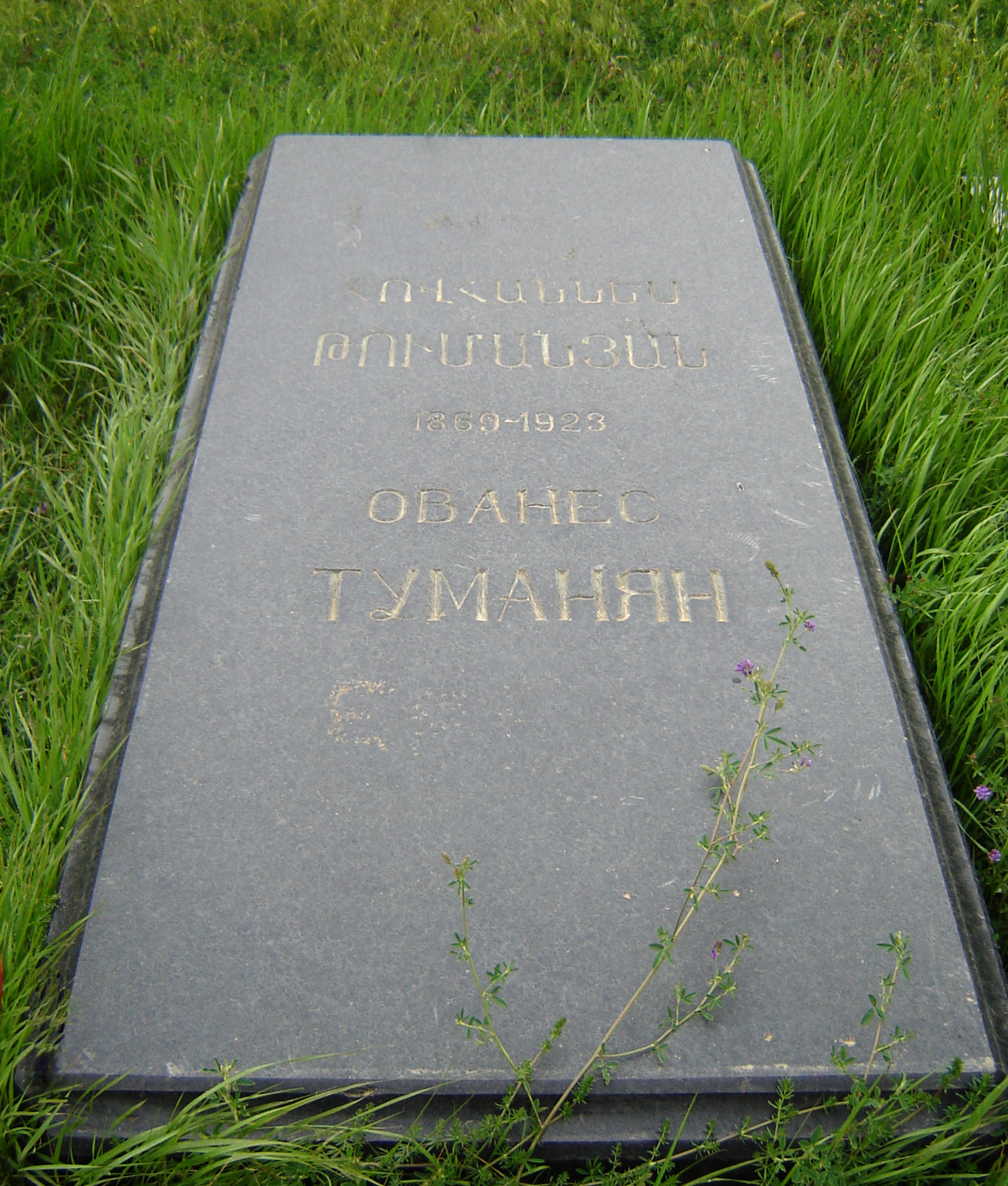
Tombstone of Tumanyan in the Armenian Pantheon of Tbilisi.

As Armenia's national poet, Tumanyan stands as a towering figure in Armenian literature and culture. In September 1969, the Soviet Armenian government of Anton Kochinyan and Badal Muradyan organized major celebrations marking the centenary of Tumanyan in Yerevan and Dsegh, with the assistance of Anastas Mikoyan. Both Mikoyan and Marshal Ivan Bagramyan personally attended the festivities.

There are two museums dedicated to Tumanyan in Armenia, one in his birthplace Dsegh and the other in Yerevan. The Tumanyan Museum in Yerevan opened in 1953. In the autumn of 2011, the government of Armenia purchased a flat in Tbilisi where Tumanyan resided and in 2017 opened it as a museum and cultural center. Tumanyan's works have been translated into numerous languages. Translators of his works into Russian include Valery Bryusov, Konstantin Balmont, Joseph Brodsky, Samuil Marshak, and Bella Akhmadulina.

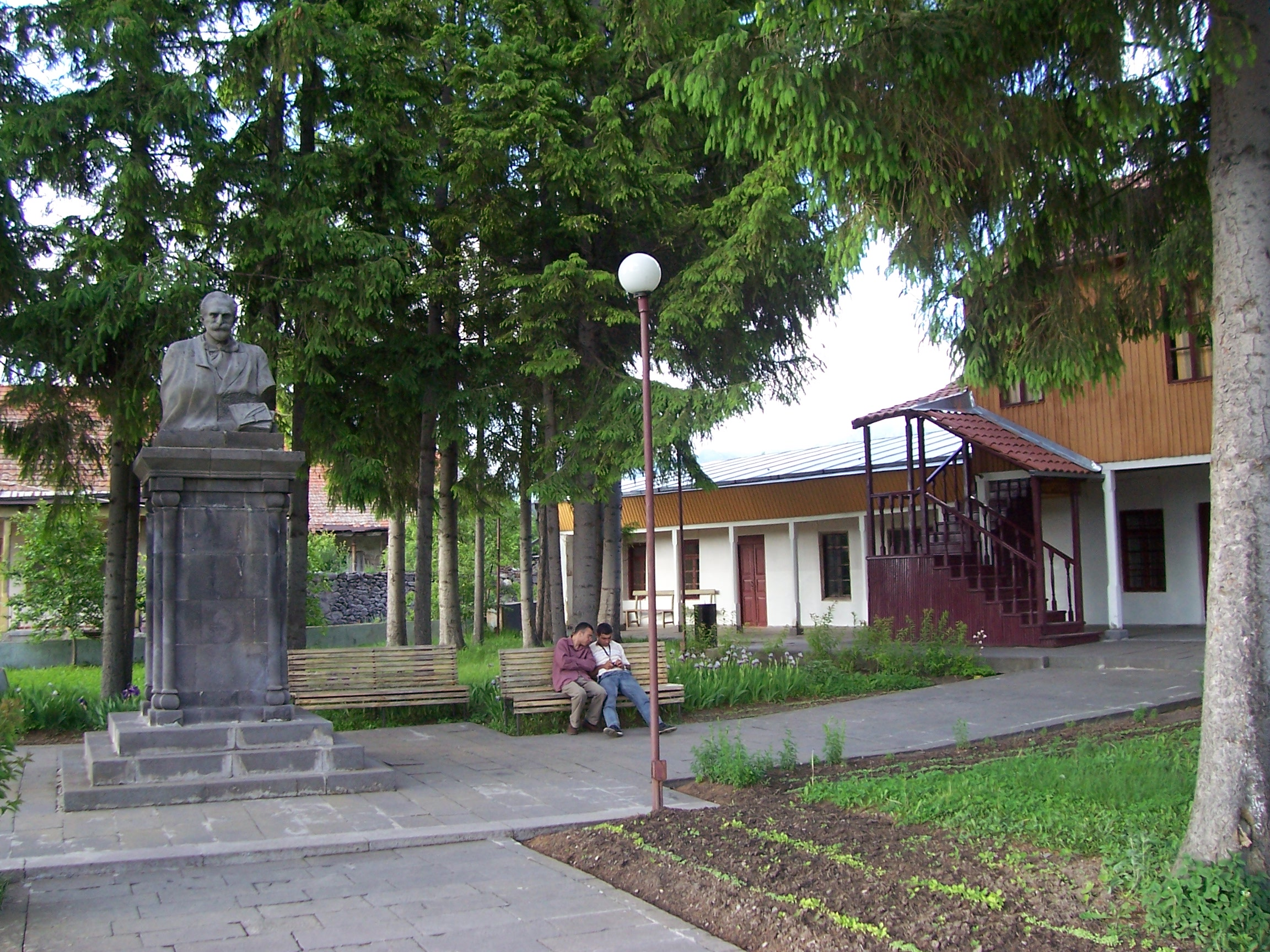
Tumanyan's House Museum in Dsegh

=== Places named after Tumanyan ===
==== In Armenia ====
- Tumanyan Matchbox Label Museum
- Tumanyan City in Lori Province, which until 1951 was named Dzaghidzor.
- Pedagogical University of Vanadzor
- Armenian State Puppet Theater in Yerevan
- Tumanyan St. in central Yerevan
- Tumanyan Park in Yerevan's Ajapnyak district
- Tumanyan's native village of Dsegh was renamed Tumanyan in his honor in 1938, before being changed back to Dsegh in 1969.

==== Outside Armenia ====
- Tumanyan Square (Площадь Туманяна) – in Northern Administrative Okrug of Moscow, Russia.
- Tumanyan Streets in Kyiv, Tbilisi (sign), Donetsk, Sochi, khutor Shaumyanovsky in Rostov Oblast.

== In popular culture ==
=== Opera ===
- Anoush (1912) by Armen Tigranian, based on the narrative poem Anush (1902)
- Almast (1930) by Alexander Spendiaryan, based on the narrative poem T’mkaberdi ar’umë (The capture of Tmkabert, 1902)

The following films were adapted from Tumanyan's works.

=== Films ===
Films based on works of Tumanyan:

- Gikor by A. Martirosyan; silent (1934)
- The Master and the Servant by D. Keosayan; Armenfilm (1962)
- Akhtamar by E. Martirosyan; Armenfilm (1969)
- Honor of the Poor by B. Hovhannisyan, A. Samvelyan; Armenfilm (1969)
- The Fat King by D. Keosayan; Armenfilm (1969)
- The Lying Hunter by Aramayis Sargsyan; Armenfilm (1969)
- Since the Time of Hunger by E. Martirosyan; Armenfilm (1974)
- Gikor by S. Israeilyan; Armenfilm (1982)
- A Drop of Honey by Henrik Malyan; in Russian; Armenfilm (1982)

=== Animated films ===
Cartoons based on works of Tumanyan:

- A Drop of Honey by V. Podpomogov (1968)
- Parvana by V. Podpomogov (1968)
- Hunter the Liar by E. Badalyan (1969)
- The Unlucky Panos by S. Galstuyan (1980)
- The Death of Kikos by Robert Sahakyants (1979)
- Wow, a Talking Fish! by Robert Sahakyants (1983)
- Nazar the Brave by Robert Sahakyants (1986)

=== Postage stamps, banknotes and coins ===
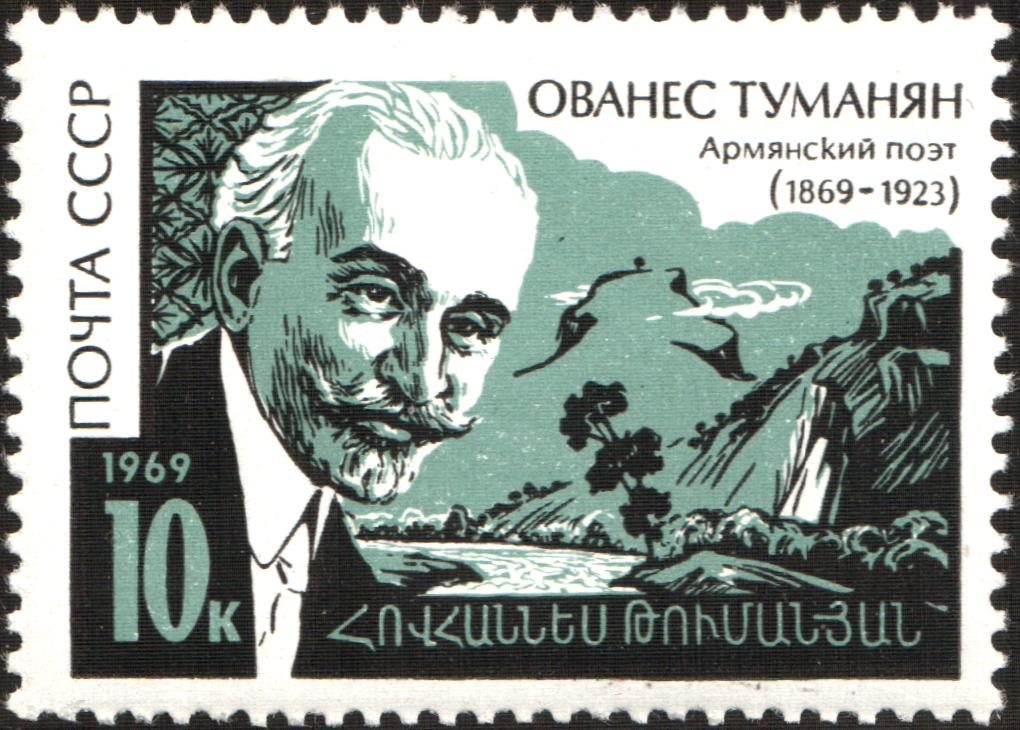
Soviet postage stamp, 1969

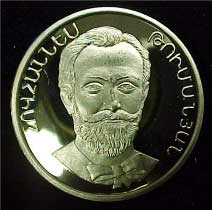
Tumanyan memorial coin, 1994

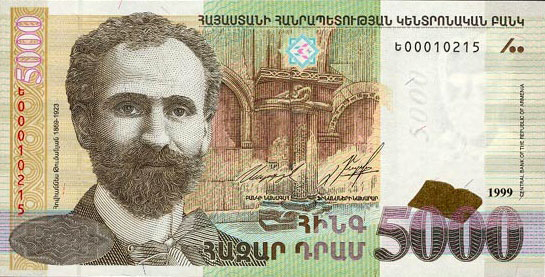
Obverse side of the 5,000 Armenian dram, 1998

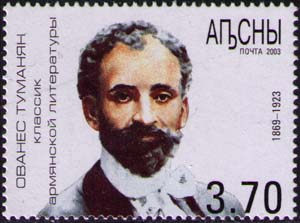
Stamp of Abkhazia, 2003

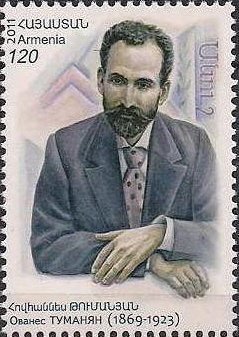
Armenian-Russian Joint issue, 2011

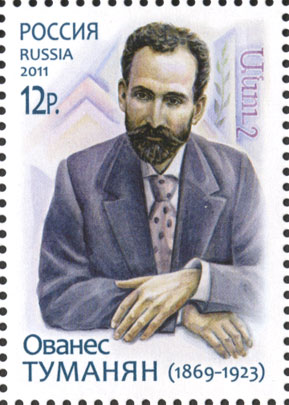
Armenian-Russian Joint issue, 2011

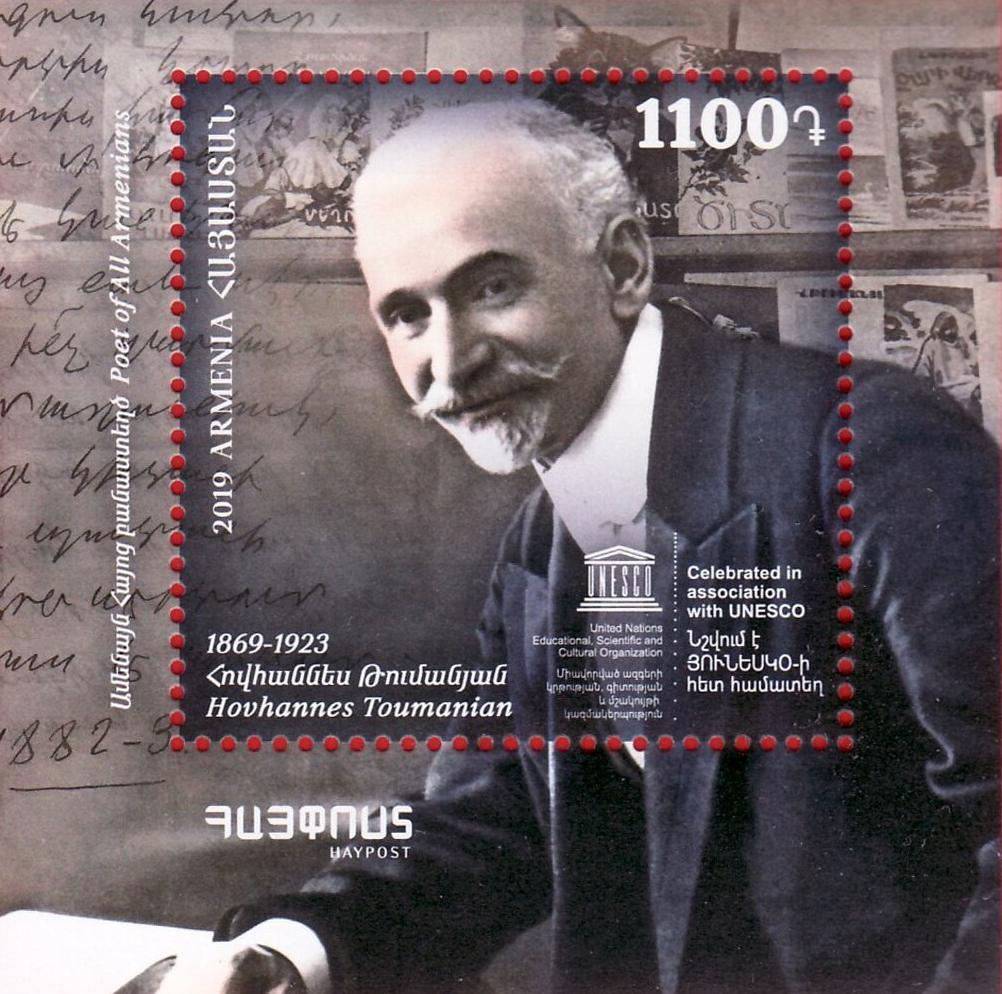
Armenian stamp sheet, 2019

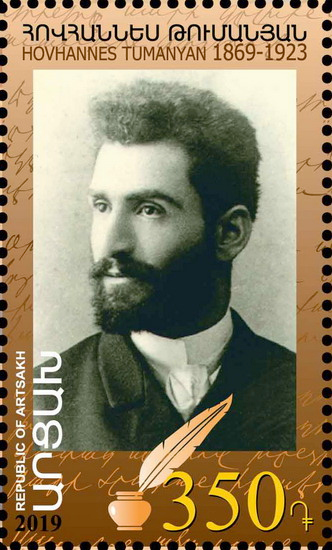
Stamp of Artsakh, 2019

== Collections in Armenian ==
- The Complete Works, Vol I-X, Yerevan, 1988-1999

== Editions in English ==
- (1950) Gikor. Translated by P. Mesrobian. Publishing House of the Ministry of the Education of the Armenian SSR.
- (1961) David of Sassoun: Armenian Folk Epic. Translated by Aram Tolegian. New York: Bookman Associates. OCLC 1657253.
- (1970) The Bard of Loree: Selected Works of Hovannes Toumanian. Translated by Mischa Kudian. London: Mashtots Press. ISBN 978-0-90303-900-0. OCLC 2661151.
- (1971) Garab, Arra M. (ed.). Hovhannes Toumanian: A Selection of Stories, Lyrics, and Epic Poems. Translated by Dorian Rottenberg and Brian Bean. New York: T & T Publishing. OCLC 315412.
- (1997) David of Sassoon. Translated by Thomas Samuelian.
- (2019) Der-Boghossian, Adrineh; Jivanyan, Alvard (eds.). Selected Works. Yerevan: Hovhannes Toumanian Museum. ISBN 978-9939-858-16-6.
- (2019) Quatrains. Translated by Shushan Avagyan. Yerevan: Hovhannes Toumanian Museum. 2019. ISBN 978-9939-858-13-5.

== See also ==
- Armenian literature
- Armenians in Georgia
- Armenians in Tbilisi
