= Dsegh =

Dsegh Դսեղ
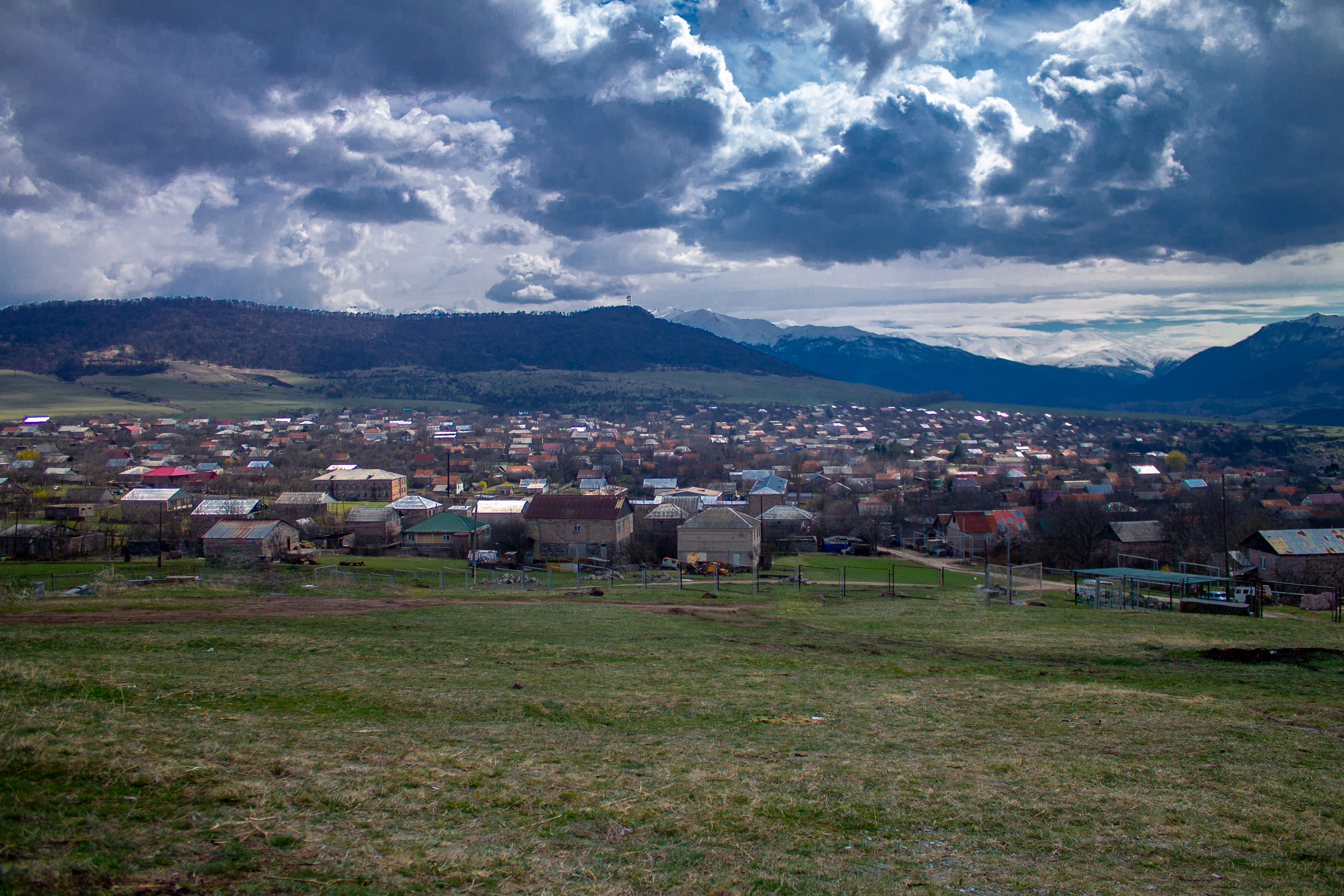

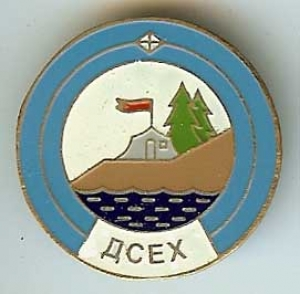
- Coat of arms

- Location within Armenia
- Coordinates: 40°57′48″N 44°39′06″E
- Country: Armenia
- Marz (Province): Lori
- Elevation: 1,225 m (4,019 ft)

Population (2011)
  - Total: 2,137
- Time zone: UTC+4 ( )
  - Summer (DST): UTC+5
- Website: www.dsegh.am

Dsegh (Armenian: Դսեղ), known as Tumanyan between 1938 and 1969, is a village in the Lori Province of Armenia. It is located about 13 km south of the city of Alaverdi, on the high right bank of the Debed River, on a peninsula surrounded by forests, on the western side of which is the Debed Gorge.

Dsegh is famous as the birthplace of the celebrated Armenian poet Hovhannes Tumanyan, after whom it was named from 1938 to 1969. Numerous sites of historical significance are located in the village, including two churches from the 7th and 8th centuries and a medieval cemetery with khachkars.

== Development programs ==
Starting 2014 Children of Armenia Fund entered Dsegh with a holistic approach to advance the rural village life.

The programs implemented include Girls of Armenia Leadership Soccer (GOALS), Student Councils, Debate Clubs, Aflatoun Social-Financial Education Club, English Language Instruction, Social and Psychological Assistance, Psychological Theater, Support to Children with Learning Difficulties, Health and Lifestyle Education, School Nutrition & Brushodromes, Free Dental Care, Women Health Screenings, Support for Reproductive Health.

Children of Armenia Fund also renovated village facilities such as Creativity Lab, Art Studio, Cafeteria and Brushodrome, SMART Room, Health Post.

Before COAF SMART Center opening there were already SMART rooms in the villages. These education rooms have all the equipment and internet connection to provide local people with new possibilities. It helps connect communities with each other and the world. SMART rooms provide education in self-development, medicine, social services, computer literacy, media literacy. These rooms enable people to learn also during winter months, when travelling in Lori region is difficult. SMART rooms are accessible not only for rural youth, but also neighboring students and community members.

== Gallery ==
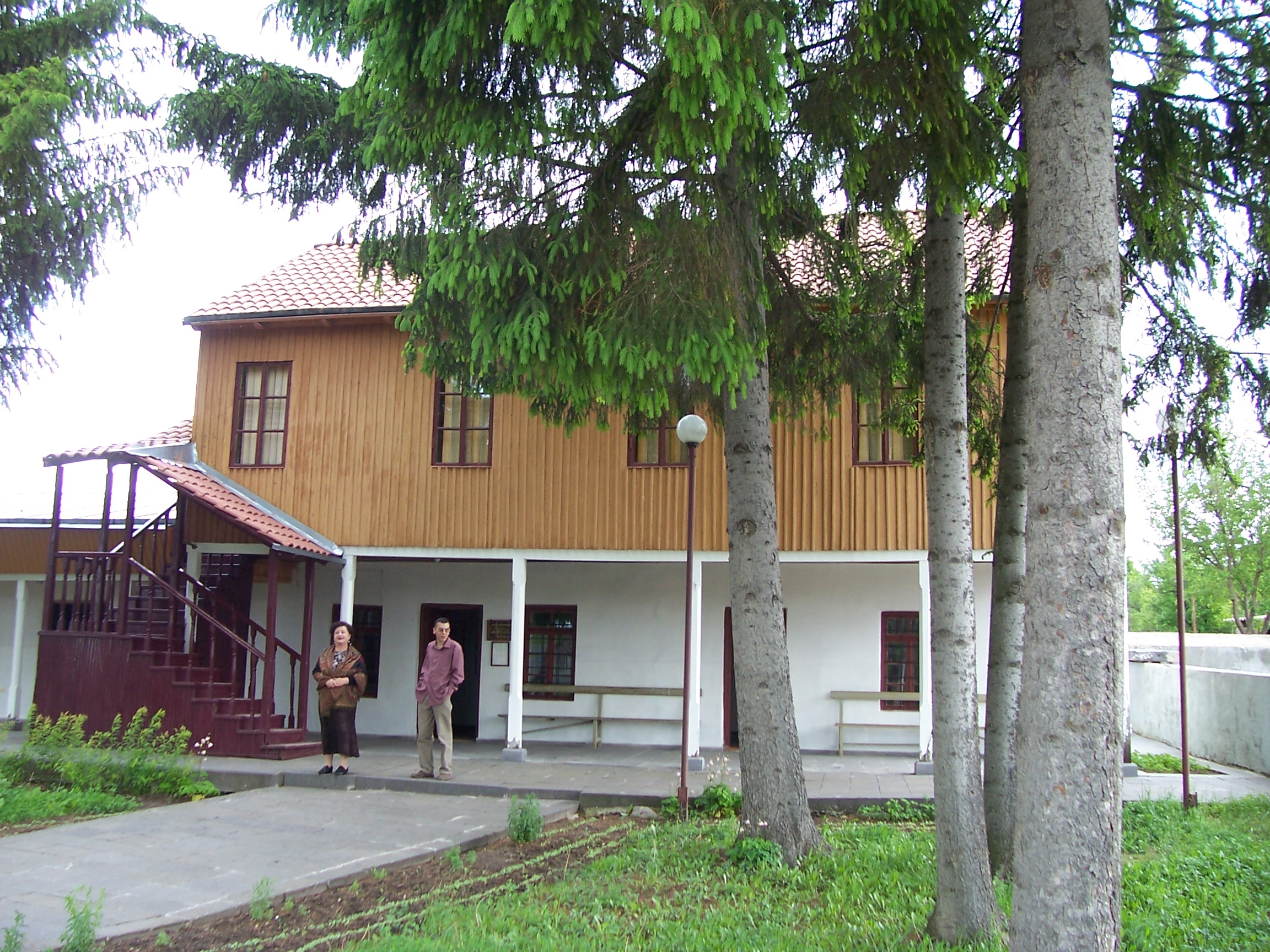
House-Museum of Hovhannes Tumanyan in Dsegh

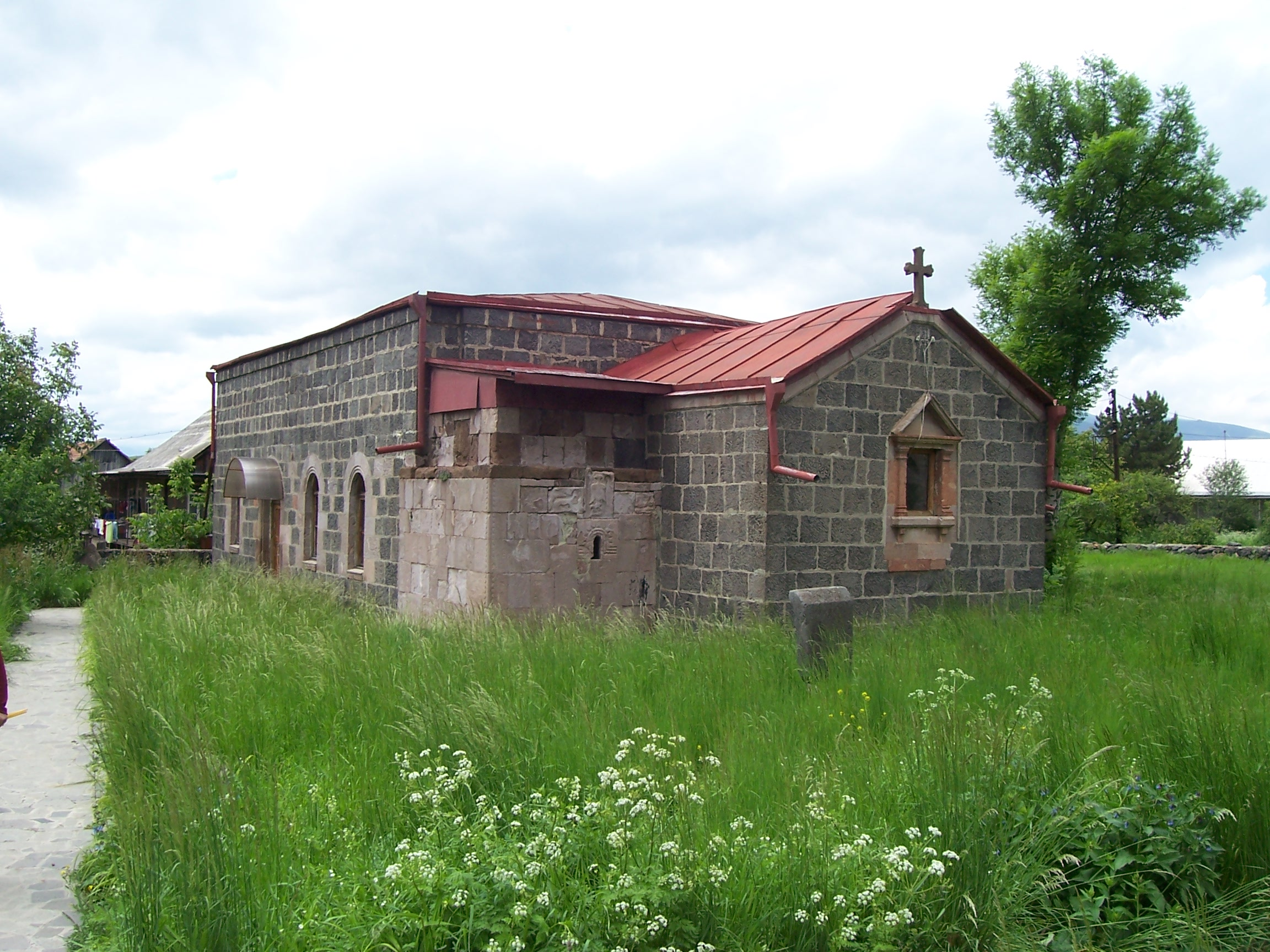
St. Gregory the Illuminator Church of Dsegh
