= Kikos (1979 film) =

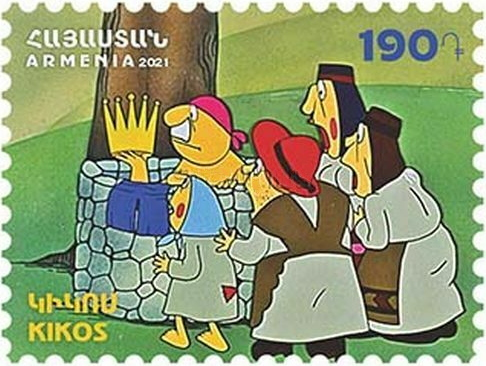
- Kikos on a 2021 stamp of Armenia
- Genre: Folklore
- Created by: Robert Sahakyants
- Written by: Hovhannes Tumanyan
- Screenplay by: Robert Sahakyants
- Directed by: Robert Sahakyants
- Narrated by: Murad Kostanyan
- Theme music composer: Yuri Arutyunyan
- Country of origin: Soviet Union

Production
- Cinematography: Alice Kyurdian
- Animator: Robert Sahakyants
- Editor: S. Vatinyan
- Production company: Armenfilm

Kikos (Armenian: Կիկոս) is a 1979 Armenian animation film by Robert Sahakyants based on the story by Hovhannes Tumanyan.

== Plot ==
A heartbroken family mourns the death of Kikos' son, nephew and grandson. The irony of the situation is that Kikos is not born yet.
