= Computer Warriors =

Toy line by Mattel

- Type: Toys, action figures
- Invented by: Mattel
- Company: Mattel
- Country: United States
- Availability: 1989–90
- Materials: Plastic
- Slogan: "Expect the unexpected!"

Computer Warriors was a toy line made by Mattel from 1989 to 1990. The storyline behind the toys involves a top-secret government computer which unleashes evil computer virus troops. These troops, led by Megahert, hide in everyday household objects and have the goal of world domination by taking control of computers. The government computer then produces antiviruses, the Computer Warriors, led by Romm to battle the Virus troops. The Computer Warriors tagline ran "Expect the unexpected!"

Unlike many toylines of the time, Computer Warriors did not feature a tie-in animated series. There was only a single pilot episode, Computer Warriors: The Adventure Begins, which was syndicated on September 23, 1990, and later released on VHS. Directed by Bill Kroyer (who also co-wrote with Carl Macek) it featured his signature style of integrating wireframe CGI with traditional hand-drawn animation.

Both the toyline and the series-pilot bore the alternate title "Computer Force" in Europe and the UK.

== Computer Warriors: The Adventure Begins ==
Computer Warriors
- Also known as: Computer Warriors: The Adventure Begins
- Written by: Carl Macek; Bill Kroyer
- Directed by: Bill Kroyer
- Music by: Jack Goga

Production
- Producer: Carl Macek
- Editor: Brad Gunther
- Production companies: Kroyer Films; Mattel Toys

At a government facility named Parallax, a massive supercomputer core suffers a power surge due to "human error" of one its operators. The surge triggers a core dump, which unleashes four A.I. programs that are transformed into dangerous Viruses, which are ejected into the Bitstream (an analog for the Internet). These Viruses are Megahert, the leader and dominant A.I.; Indexx, his advisor who has access to information data; Null, a dimwitted lackey who follows Megahert without question; and Minus, an unstable minion who thirsts for power. These four seek to return to Parallax to use its systems to seize the Bitstream and use it to take over all the world's computers.

In response, the Parallax Core Processing Unit generates four unique "anti-viral" programs, to stop the Viruses before they can do any damage. These "Computer Warriors" are Romm, the command program and leader; Skannar, who can track the Viruses trail through the Bitstream; Gridd, a diagnostic program with skills to keep himself and the others operating; and Micronn, a statistical program which has access to the data banks at Parallax, to aid their mission.

Riding on Circuit Gliders, the Computer Warriors chase the Viruses down, but the Viruses manage to escape by use of a Telecom Port, which explodes after they damage it. Romm believes that they are neutralized, but the Viruses survived by being transported into the physical world outside of computers: in a suburban family's home. The Telecom Port is repaired by Parallax—after the CPU detects Indexx accessing one of its data banks—and the Warriors head back to transfer through it, ending up in the same house. Both the Viruses and Warriors soon learn they can scan and adapt camouflage shells that look like ordinary, everyday objects, which allow them to continue their battle to either capture or destroy the other side.

Eventually, after some skirmishes, Romm uses the home computer's disc drive to capture the Viruses on CD-Rom discs, but before the Warriors can return them to the Bitstream, a young boy who owns the computer finds the discs, and decides to take them to a friend's house, as his friend has a better computer to use for his homework. Discovering the location of this computer, the Warriors head back into the Bitstream in an attempt to reach it first.

== Toyline ==
The toyline consisted of 12 different sets belonging to 3 price ranges: 4 basic/individual sets, 6 transforming vehicle sets, and 2 larger "headquarters" playsets. The basic sets were the lowest price point and the most widely available. Each included a circuit board that unfolds into a futuristic glider, and featured either the "Romm", "Megahert", "Debugg", or "Asynk", figures. The vehicles and headquarters playsets were as follows:

- Pepsi can which transforms into "hyper hoverjet". Includes "Gridd" hero figure.
- Soccer trophy ("MVP", in the form of a ball) which transforms into "radar rover". Includes "Null" villain figure.
- Functioning calculator ("AdAll") which transforms into "techno-tank". Includes "Dekodar" hero figure.
- Functioning digital clock ("Timeltel") which transforms into "syncro-blaster". Includes "Micronn" hero figure.
- Functioning pencil sharpener ("LeadHead") which transforms into "techno-jet". Includes "Minus" villain figure.
- Functioning flashlight ("Beamer") which transforms into "flash craft". Includes "Skannar" hero figure.
- Book (entitled Invasion of the Viruses) which opens to reveal the villains' "evil rocket base". Includes "Indexx" villain figure.
- Desktop computer ("Parallax") which transforms into the heroes' "strategic weapons base". Includes both "Chip" hero and "Cursor" villain figures.

The figures featured four points of articulation – two in the hips and two in the shoulders. Their posteriors were sculpted and painted to resemble printed circuit boards. The 7 hero figures had human faces whereas the 6 Viruses had distorted, asymmetrical facial features. The vehicle and headquarters sets featured hinged, fold-out parts that revealed a micro vehicle cockpit or command center inside with decals covering the inner walls and at least one chair for the characters to sit in. While substantially small, these sets offered a commendable amount of detail in both the figure sculpts and interior decals.
