= Bill Kroyer =

American animator

William Kroyer
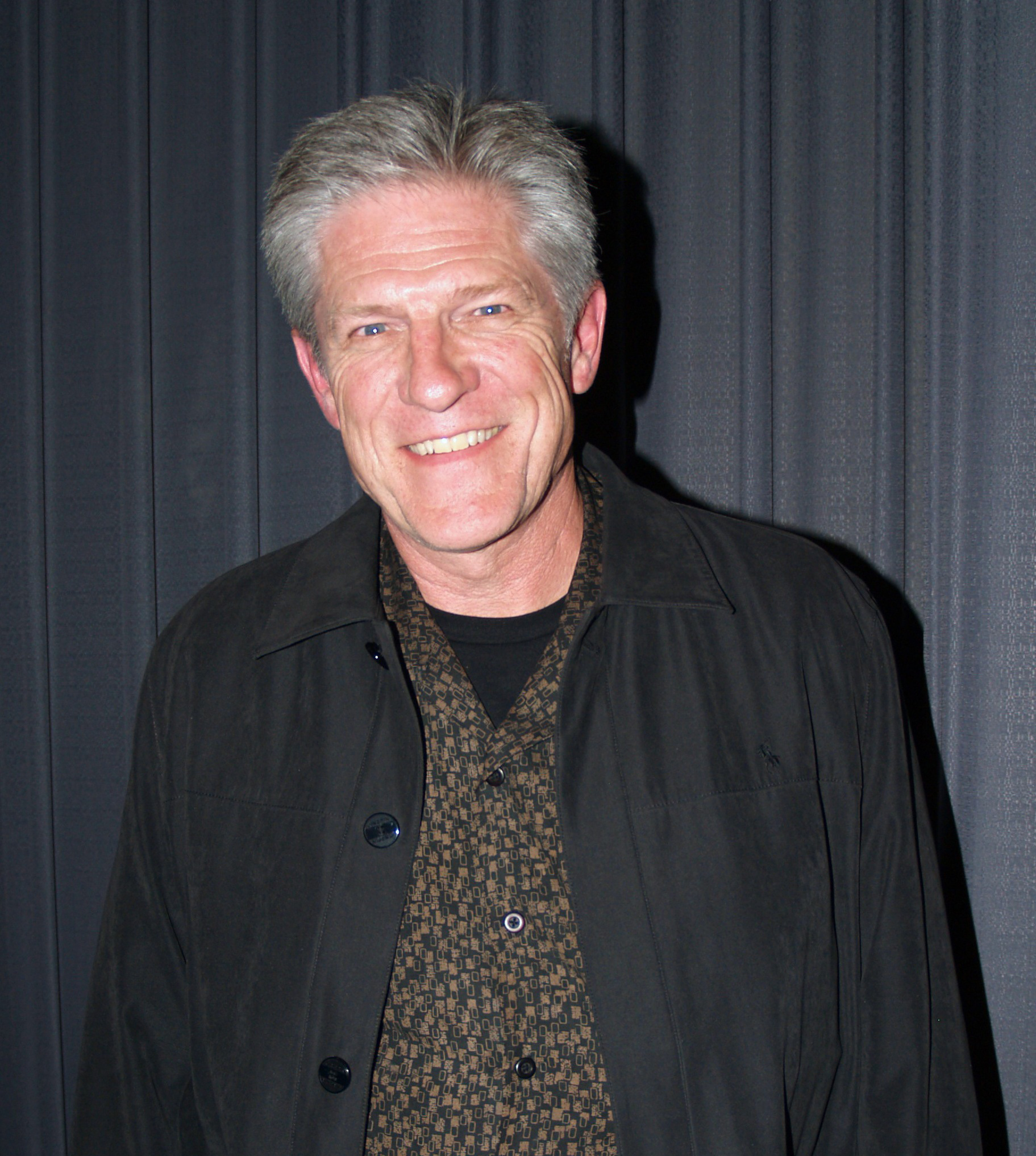
- Kroyer at a September 16, 2013 Tom Sito lecture and book signing at the SVA Theatre in Manhattan
- Occupations: Visual effects animator; animator; film director; writer
- Years active: 1975–present
- Spouse: Susan Kroyer (née Nelson)

William Kroyer is an American director of animation and computer graphics commercials, short films, movie titles, and theatrical films. He and Jerry Rees were the main animators for the CGI sequences in Tron. From 2009 to 2021, he served as the head of the Digital Arts department at Lawrence and Kristina Dodge College of Film and Media Arts at Chapman University.

== Career ==
Kroyer began his animation career in 1975 by working in a small commercial studio. In 1977, he finally ended up at Disney Studios as animator on The Fox and the Hound but left Disney later because he did not want to work on The Black Cauldron. It was then he met future Tron director Steven Lisberger, who was working on Animalympics. After Animalympics was completed, Lisberger developed Tron and sold it to Disney.

After Tron was finished, Kroyer decided to stay with computer animation instead of traditional animation and worked at Robert Abel and Associates and Digital Productions. In 1986, he and his wife, Sue, started Kroyer Films to combine computer animation with hand-drawn animation. They made a short film titled Technological Threat; it was nominated for an Academy Award in 1988 and preserved by the Academy Film Archive in 2008.

After Technological Threat was finished, Kroyer decided to stay with computer animation for films such as Jetsons: The Movie and Rugrats in Paris: The Movie.

He directed Computer Warriors: The Adventure Begins in 1990 and then FernGully: The Last Rainforest in 1992. He was originally set to direct Quest for Camelot but left the project over creative differences.

Soon after he joined Rhythm and Hues Studios as Senior Animation Director and supervised the CGI animation for films such as Garfield, Scooby-Doo, Cats & Dogs and The Flintstones in Viva Rock Vegas.

In early 2009, he began teaching at Chapman University's Dodge College of Film and Media Arts in Orange, California.

In 2017, he and his wife Susan became the first couple to receive the June Foray Award from the international Animation Society for their "contributions to the art and industry of animation."

He is the author of Mr. In-Between: My life in the Middle of the Animation Revolution, published by the Taylor & Francis Group in 2025.

== Filmography ==
- Rugrats in Paris: The Movie (CG animation director: Rhythm & Hues)
- The Flintstones in Viva Rock Vegas (CG animation director: Rhythm & Hues)
- The Green Mile (animation supervisor: Rhythm & Hues)
- FernGully: The Last Rainforest (director)
- Computer Warriors: The Adventure Begins (writer, director)
- Jetsons: The Movie (computer animator: vehicle animation)
- Technological Threat (writer, director, producer, computer animation)
- Starchaser: The Legend of Orin (computer animation planner, key animator)
- Tron (production storyboards, computer image choreography)
- Animalympics (animation director, animator)

== See also ==
- Kroyer Films
- Rhythm & Hues
- Robert Abel and Associates
- Digital Productions
- Silicon Graphics
- Wavefront Technologies
- Alias Research
- Symbolics Graphics Division
- Apple Macintosh
- Softimage 3D
- CSRG, UC Berkeley
