= Fakhri Odeh =

Kuwaiti actor (1950–2025)

Fakhri Odeh فخري عودة
- Born: 4 January 1950; Kuwait
- Died: 6 May 2025 (aged 75)
- Occupation: Actor
- Years active: 1970–2025

Fakhri Odeh (Arabic: فخري عودة) (4 January 1950 – 6 May 2025) was a Kuwaiti actor. He died on 6 May 2025, at the age of 75.

== Works ==
=== Plays ===
- Chaos (1974)

=== Series TV ===
- Darb Al Zalik
- Al Alkdar (1977)

=== Program ===
- Salamtak (1980)

=== Dubbing ===
Future Boy Conan as Lepka (1981)
