= The Lesson (1987 film) =

- Directed by: R. Sahakyants
- Written by: R. Sahakyants
- Produced by: S. Petrosyan
- Cinematography: A. Kyurdian
- Edited by: A. Vatyan
- Production company: Armenfilm
- Release date: 1987
- Running time: 17 minutes
- Country: Soviet Union
- Languages: Russian; Armenian; English

The Lesson (Russian: Урок, Urok, Armenian: Դաս) is a Soviet-Armenian science fiction animated short film directed by Armenian animator Robert Sahakyants, produced by the Armenfilm studio.

== Plot ==
In the far future, a starship arrives to orbit an unexplored planet. A group of hunters and thrill-seekers lands on the planet. On the surface of the planet is detected life: unknown animals and vegetation, which look caricatures to terrestrial counterparts. A frivolous extermination of the local fauna and flora by earthlings begins.

The only woman in the team becomes a witness to how the local laws of nature work: if one creature kills another, then the killer is reborn as the victim. Moreover, this rule works both for aggressive intruders and for the animals themselves. The woman tries to warn the crew, but they don't listen, and most of the crew are reborn as local creatures. Having understood this law, she decides to consciously kill a bird in order to become one, but after the shot something new happens: the bird partially returns to itself the appearance of one of the astronauts, since the first death and transformation had already happened earlier. Now he looks like a man with caricature features of a vulture. Thus, the characters learn that by killing creatures for second time, they can return the team at least in this state. Not having time to warn the captain, who turned into a kind of toad before their eyes, and wanting to return him, they exceed the necessary laser power, and many small copies of a jumping man are restored from the toad torn apart. A woman, a bird-man, captain toad's clones, and a fish-man (who fished, turned, and then suffered a second death by suffocating on the shore) flee the planet, while the other part remains on it in the form of animals. After the end credits, the viewer sees that one of the toad captain's clones has been forgotten, he waves in vain after the ship, sits down on one of the abandoned blasters and assumes the pose of the Thinker sculpture.

== Music ==
In the credits, the writers and performers of the soundtrack were not listed. Some identified songs used were "Rockit" by Herbie Hancock, "Nightflight to Venus" by Boney M., "Oxygene, Pt. 1" by Jean-Michel Jarre, "Equinoxe, Pt. 5" by Jean-Michel Jarre, and "Imagine" by John Lennon.
