= Technological Threat =

1988 film by Bill Kroyer

- Directed by: Bill Kroyer
- Story by: Bill Kroyer; Rich Moore; Brian Jennings
- Produced by: Bill Kroyer
- Animation by: Greg Vanzo; Rich Moore; Susan Kroyer; Chris Bailey; Rob Minkoff; Alan Smart
- Production company: Kroyer Films, Inc.
- Distributed by: Shorts International (current)
- Release dates: April 16, 1988 (Ottawa International Animation Festival); May 15, 1988 (United States)
- Running time: 5 minutes
- Country: United States
- Language: English

Technological Threat is a 1988 American animated short made by Brian Jennings and Bill Kroyer and was produced by Kroyer Films. It was an example of early computer animation, integrated with traditional animation, and is itself an allegory for the possibilities of combining the two. The robots and backgrounds were drawn based on computer-generated 3D models, while the dogs and wolves were drawn by hand.

== Plot ==
The film takes place in an office staffed by wolves who hand-copy documents using pencils. One of them collapses because of overwork. The bulldog boss pushes a button that carries him through a trapdoor below the worker's desk, and replaces him with a robot that writes faster. Another yawns, and is also dropped through a trapdoor under his desk and replaced by a robot. Three more are eliminating for drinking water, sneezing and injury (one of them desperately plugs his nose with two pencils, but is unable to keep from sneezing, propelling the pencils into another's head). They are replaced by more robots. The remaining worker, madly scribbling away, is shocked to discover that his boss has been replaced by a boss robot. When the latter leaves, the last worker decides to take action, and begins destroying the robots in various cartoony ways (blowing one up with a stick of dynamite, dropping another through its desk trapdoor, yet another by hitting it with different objects, and electrically shocking another into a pile of cinders). As the worker and the one remaining robot are locked in a life-or-death struggle, they see the boss robot threatening to push the trapdoor button. In a sudden instance of cooperating, they shove the trapdoor beneath the boss robot, who falls in. As the two workers peer down the open trapdoor, the remaining worker becomes aware of the opportunity being presented and shoves the robot in thus ending the film with a cigar in his hand and eventually pushing the trapdoor button on the viewer.

== Credits ==
=== Staff ===
- Producer/Director: Bill Kroyer
- Technical Director: Brian Jennings
- Character Animation: Greg Vanzo, Rich Moore, Susan Kroyer, Chris Bailey, Rob Minkoff, Alan Smart
- Computer Animation: Bill Kroyer
- Character Design: Bill Kroyer, Rich Moore, Brian Jennings
- Script: Bill Kroyer, Rich Moore, Brian Jennings
- Test Camera: Klasky/Csupo, Inc.
- Ink & Paint/Production Camera: Hanho Heung-up Co., Ltd.
- Production: Kroyer Films

The film's credits give "special thanks to" Brad Bird, Yutaka Fujioka, Mike Giaimo, Masami Hata, Gábor Csupó, and Bill Hedge.

== Accolades and legacy ==
Technological Threat was featured on the VHS and DVD Computer Animation Festival, Vol. 2 and Computer Animation Festival Vol. 3 (renamed Computer Animation Experience in 2001). It also aired in the second third-season episode of Liquid Television, in 1993.

At the 1988 Ottawa International Animation Festival, Technological Threat shared the prize for "Best film under 5 minutes" with Paul Vester's Picnic. It was nominated for the Academy Award for Best Animated Short Film in 1989, but lost to a fully CGI short: Pixar's Tin Toy. It also won the Apollo Award at the Annecy Animation Festival.

It was also part of the International Tournee of Animation alongside fellow Oscar nominee The Cat Came Back.

The Academy Film Archive preserved Technological Threat in 2013.
