= Kroyer Films =

American animation studio

Kroyer Films, Inc.
- Industry: Animation; Computer animation
- Founded: 1986
- Founder: Bill Kroyer and Susan Kroyer
- Defunct: January 7, 2022
- Fate: Dissolved
- Headquarters: Hollywood, California, United States
- Products: Animated feature films

Kroyer Films, Inc. was an American animation studio originally formed in 1986 by animator Bill Kroyer and his wife Susan Kroyer, and was one of the earliest studios to combine computer and hand-drawn animation. Kroyer Films became dormant after 1994 and was ultimately dissolved on January 7, 2022.

== Productions ==
Kroyer Films produced the Oscar-nominated short film Technological Threat and the 20th Century Fox feature film FernGully: The Last Rainforest. It also produced the animation for the 1994 video game Pitfall: The Mayan Adventure.

== Legacy ==
The Academy Film Archive preserved Technological Threat in 2013.

== Filmography ==
Films

- Technological Threat (1988) (Oscar nomination)
- Troop Beverly Hills (1989) (title animation with Spümcø)
- Honey, I Shrunk the Kids (1989) (title animation)
- The Making of Me (1989) (animation on the sperm with Walt Disney Animation Studios)
- Christmas Vacation (1989) (title animation)
- Jetsons: The Movie (1990) (vehicle animation)
- FernGully: The Last Rainforest (1992)
- Tom and Jerry: The Movie (1992) (computer animation)
- The Thief and the Cobbler (1993) (additional animation)
- Son of the Pink Panther (1993) (title animation)
- Asterix Conquers America (1994) (additional animation)

TV Series

- Bobby's World (1990) (title animation)
- Widget the World Watcher (1990) (character designs)
- Computer Warriors (1990) (TV pilot)

Video Game

- Pitfall: The Mayan Adventure (1994) (original animation)

== See also ==
- Wavefront Technologies
- Silicon Graphics
- Robert Abel & Associates
- Alias Research
- Pixar RenderMan
- Symbolics Graphics Division
- Apple Macintosh
- Digital Productions
- Softimage 3D
