= Robert Sahakyants =

Soviet and Armenian director, screenwriter and cartoon artist

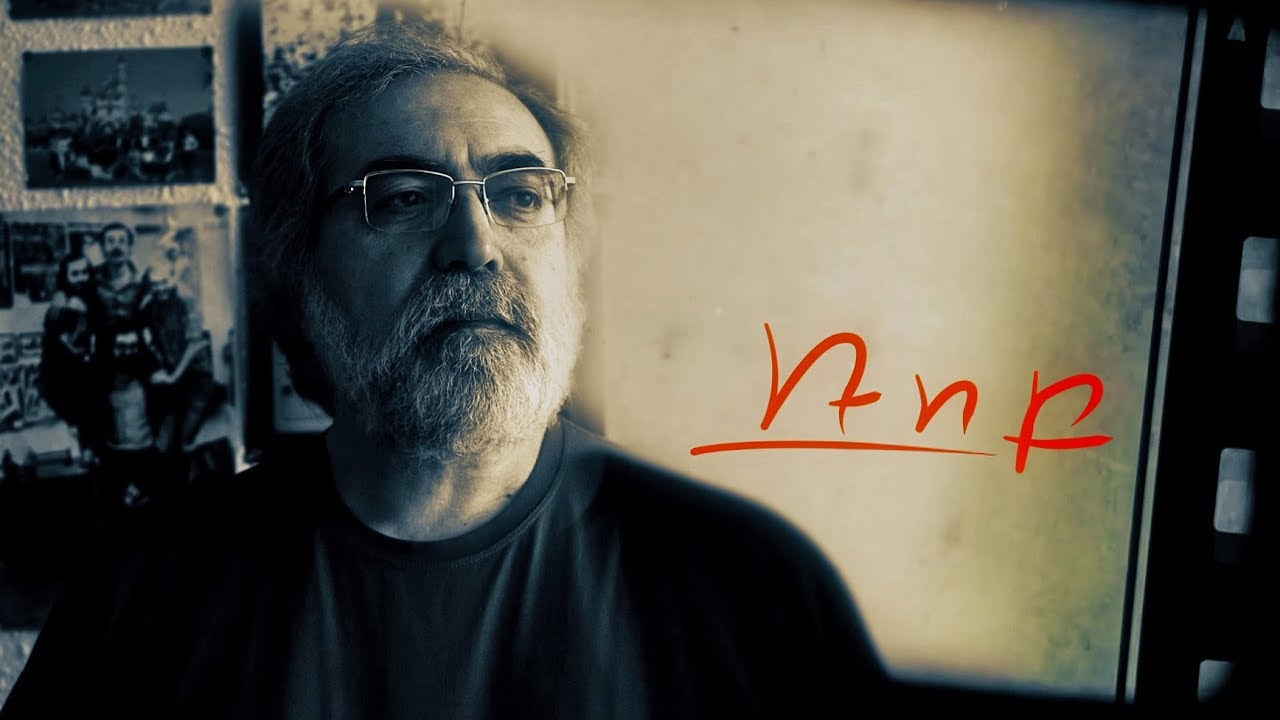
- Born: 30 August 1950; Baku, Azerbaijan SSR, Soviet Union
- Died: 24 September 2009 (aged 59); Yerevan, Armenia
- Occupation: Animator
- Years active: 1973–2009

Robert Arshavirovich Sahakyants (Armenian: Ռոբերտ Արշավիրի Սահակյանց, Russian: Роберт Аршавирович Саакянц, 30 August 1950 – 24 September 2009) was an Armenian animator in the former Soviet Union and Armenia.

== Life ==
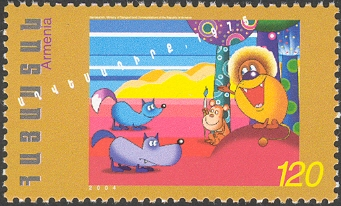
A snapshot from the 1975 cartoon The Fox's Book by Sahakyants on a 2004 Armenian stamp

Sahakyants was born in Baku, in Soviet Azerbaijan, on 30 August 1950. In 1964, he and his family moved to Yerevan, Soviet Armenia.

Since 1970, he has worked at the Armenfilm film studio as an animator, and since 1972 as an animated director. He was the author of many cartoons and in 1987, was awarded the title of Honored Art Worker of the Armenian SSR. In the same year, his animated film, The Lesson, was shown at the Soviet Union film festival where it won an award. In 2008, he received the title of Honored Artist of Armenia. His films have received awards at international film festivals in Italy, Spain, France, Germany, Japan, Ukraine, and other countries.

He died on 24 September 2009 in Yerevan, Armenia. A memorial was erected in his honor in Yerevan in 2013.

== Selected filmography ==
- The Fox Who Couldn't Do Anything (1976)
- Hunters (1977)
- Kikos (1979)
- Three Blue-Blue Lakes of Crimson Color (1981)
- Who Will Tell the Tale? (1982)
- Wow, a Talking Fish! (1983)
- In the Blue Sea, in the White Foam... (1984)
- Wow, Butter Week! (1985)
- The Lesson (1987)
- The Wind (1988)
- The Axe (1994)
- Presidential Elections (1994)

== See also ==
- List of Armenian films
