= Animation studio =

Company producing animated media

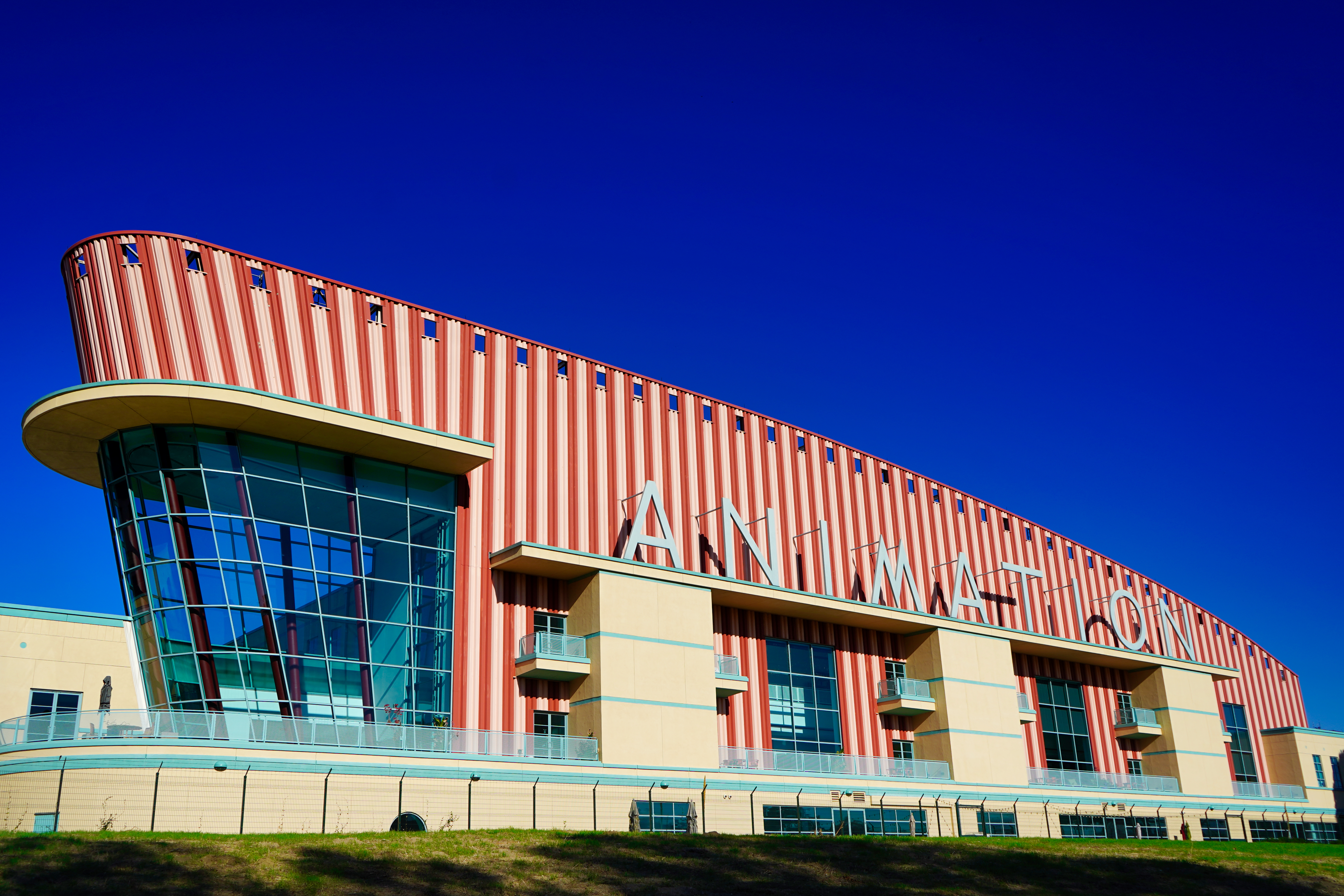
Walt Disney Animation Studios, 2020

An animation studio is a company producing animated media. The broadest such companies conceive of products to produce, own the physical equipment for production, employ operators for that equipment, and hold a major stake in the sales or rentals of the media produced. They also own rights over merchandising and creative rights for characters created or held by the company, much like authors holding copyrights. In some early cases, they also held patent rights over methods of animation used in certain studios that were used for boosting productivity. Overall, they are business concerns and can function as such in legal terms.

== American studios ==
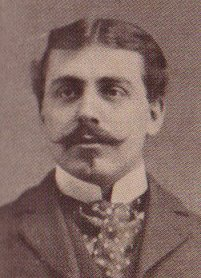
Raoul Barré

The idea of a studio dedicated to animating cartoons was spearheaded by Raoul Barré and his studio, Barré Studio, co-founded with Bill Nolan, beating out the studio created by J.R. Bray, Bray Productions, to the honor of the first studio dedicated to animation.

Though beaten to the post of being the first studio, Bray's studio employee, Earl Hurd, came up with patents designed for mass-producing the output for the studio. As Hurd did not file for these patents under his own name but handed them to Bray, they would go on to form the Bray-Hurd Patent Company and sold these techniques for royalties to other animation studios of the time.

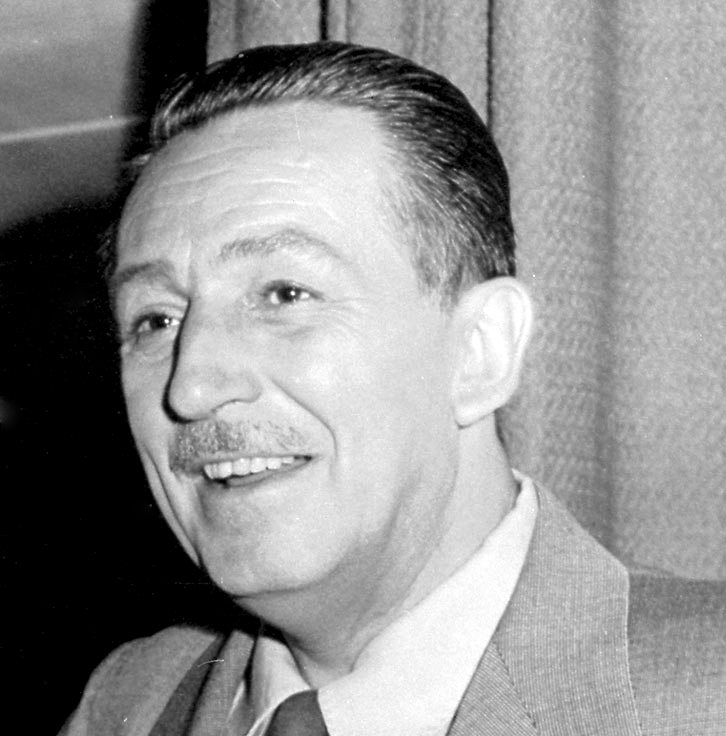
Walt Disney

The biggest name in animation studios during this early time was Disney Brothers Animation Studio (now known as Walt Disney Animation Studios), co-founded by Walt and Roy O. Disney. Started on October 16, 1923, the studio went on to make its first animated short, Steamboat Willie in 1928, to much critical success, though the real breakthrough was in 1937, when the studio was able to produce a full-length animated feature film i.e. Snow White and the Seven Dwarfs, which laid the foundation for other studios to try to make full-length movies. In 1932 Flowers and Trees, a production by Walt Disney Productions and United Artists, won the first Academy Award for Best Animated Short Film. This period, from the 1920s to the 1950s or sometimes considered from 1911 to the death of Walt Disney in 1966, is commonly known as the Golden Age of American Animation as it included the growth of Disney, as well as the rise of Warner Bros. Cartoons and the Metro-Goldwyn-Mayer cartoon studio as prominent animation studios. Disney continued to lead in technical prowess among studios for a long time afterwards, as can be seen with their achievements. In 1941, Otto Messmer created the first animated television commercials for Botany Tie ads/weather reports. They were shown on NBC-TV in New York until 1949. This marked the first forays of animation designed for the smaller screen and was to be followed by the first animated series specifically made for television, Crusader Rabbit, in 1948. Its creator, Alex Anderson, had to create the studio 'Television Arts Productions' specifically for the purpose of creating this series as his old studio, Terrytoons, refused to make a series for television. Since Crusader Rabbit, however, many studios have seen this as a profitable enterprise and many have entered the made for television market since, with Joseph Barbera and William Hanna refining the production process for television animation on their show Ruff and Reddy. It was in 1958 that The Huckleberry Hound Show claimed the title of being the first all-new half-hour cartoon show. This, along with their previous success with the series Tom and Jerry, elevated their animation studio, H.B. Enterprises (later Hanna-Barbera Productions), to dominate the North American television animation market during the latter half of the 20th century.

In 2002, Shrek, produced by DreamWorks and Pacific Data Images won the first Academy Award for Best Animated Feature. Since then, Disney/Pixar have produced the most number of movies either to win or be nominated for the award.

=== Direct-to-video market ===
Though the term "direct-to-video" carries negative connotations in the North American and European markets, direct-to-video animation has seen a rise, as a concept, in the Western markets. With many comic characters receiving their versions of OVA's, original video animations, under the Westernized title of direct-to-video animations, the OVA market has spread to American animation houses. Their popularity has resulted in animated adaptations of comic characters ranging from Hellboy, Green Lantern and Avengers. Television shows such as Family Guy and Futurama also released direct-to-video animations. DC Comics have continually released their own animated movies for the sole purpose of sale in the direct-to-video market. With growing worries about piracy, direct to video animation might become more popular in the near future.

=== Ownership trends ===
With the growth of animation as an industry, the trends of ownership of studios have gradually changed with time. Current studios such as Warner Bros. and early ones such as Fleischer Studios, started life as small, independent studios, being run by a very small core group. After being bought out or sold to other companies, they eventually consolidated with other studios and became larger. The drawback of this setup was that there was now a major thrust towards profitability with the management acting as a damper towards creativity of these studios, continuing even in today's scenario.

Currently, the independent animation studios are looking to ensure artistic integrity by signing up with big animation studios on contracts that allow them to license out movies, without being directed by the bigger studios. Examples of such co-operation are the joint ventures between DreamWorks and Paramount Pictures and that of Blue Sky Studios and 20th Century Studios.

On August 22, 2016, Comcast's NBCUniversal acquired DreamWorks Animation, appointing Meledandri oversee Comcast's Universal Animation/DreamWorks/Illumination, Disney's Disney Animation/Pixar/20th Century Animation, & Warner Bros. Warner Bros. Animation/Warner Bros. Pictures Animation.

== Japanese studios ==
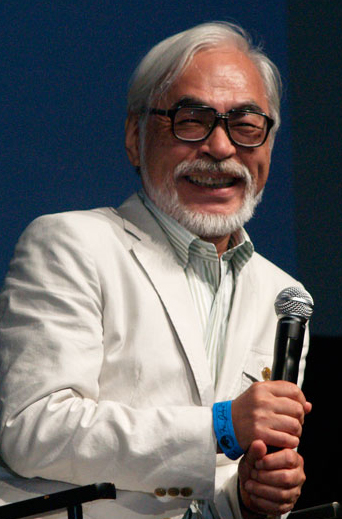
Hayao Miyazaki

The first known example of Japanese animation, also called anime, is dated around 1917, but it would take until 1956 for the Japanese animation industry to successfully adopt the studio format as used in the United States. In 1961, these productions began to be aired in the US. Toei Animation, formed in 1948, was the first Japanese animation studio of importance and saw the reduction of animators as independent anime artists.

After the formation of Toei Animation Co. Ltd. in 1948, the Japanese studios churned out minor works of animation. But with the release of Toei's first theatrical feature, The Tale of the White Serpent released in October 1958, the animation industry in Japan came into the eye of the general public.

The success of Alakazam the Great led to the finding of the artist Osamu Tezuka, who would go on to become the father of Japanese manga with his brand of modern, fast-paced fantasy storylines. He became influenced by Hanna-Barbera productions of the late 1950s and made Japan's first made for television animation studio, Mushi Productions. The success of the studios' first show in 1963, Astro Boy, was so immense that there were 3 other television animation studios by the end of the year and Toei had opened their own made for television division. The greatest difference between Japanese studios and North American studios was the difference in adult-themed material to make way in Japan. Tezuka's thought that animation should not be restricted to kids alone has brought about many studios that are employed in the production of adult-themed adaptations of classic stories such as Heidi (Heidi, Girl of the Alps), One Thousand and One Nights and The Diary of a Young Girl and many more.

In the 1980s, animation studios were led back to their theatrical roots due to the success of Hayao Miyazaki's film Nausicaä of the Valley of the Wind, which led publishing house Tokuma Shoten to finance a new animation studio, Studio Ghibli, which would be used for the personal works of Miyazaki and his close friend, Isao Takahata. Many of Ghibli's works have become Japan's top-grossing theatrical films, whether in live-action or animated form.

=== OAV/OVA market ===
The market for 'OAV's or 'Original Anime Video' later the acronym would be better known as 'OVA' meaning 'Original video animation' as the term 'OAV' could often be misunderstood for 'Original Adult Video', began in 1984. These are often tended towards the home video market, while not tending to the television or theatrical audience as such. They refer to those movies that are launched as direct-to-video releases and not meant to be released in theatres. Video productions can run from half an hour productions to well over two hours. They require that premise or story be original in order to be counted as an OVA, though sometimes, the story can be derived from a longer running manga or animated series. As the OAV market is not adapted to the rigors that are faced by television shows or feature films, they have been known to show gratuitous amounts of violence and/or pornography. Some OAV's have registered such strong acclaim that they have been remade as anime television series as well as theatrical releases.

Since most new OVA's are derived from other animated media, many animation studios that have previously worked on animated series or movies, and adaptations of Japanese manga, have now entered the OVA market, looking to capitalize on the popularity of their flagship shows. Studios participating in such circumstances include Production I.G and Studio Deen.

== Animator's contracts ==
Although there are permanent/full-time positions in studios, most animators work on a contract basis. There are some animators that are considered to be in the core group of the studio, which can either be as a result of being there since the inception of the company or being talented recruits from other animation studios. These are the more secure positions in an animation studio, though the studio might have policies concerning the possible tenure of animators. Since studios can hire animators on a work for hire basis nowadays, many artists do not retain rights over their creations, unlike some of the early animators. The extent of these copyrights is subject to local intellectual property rights.

The animators must also be aware of the contracts laws and labour laws prevalent in the jurisdiction to which the animation studio is subject to. There have been numerous legal battles fought over the copyright of famous franchises, such as Kung Fu Panda and SpongeBob SquarePants. This has come about as a result of the clause in Copyright contracts that states that an idea cannot be protected, only an actual piece of work can be said to be infringed upon. This means that though the animators may have forwarded ideas to the animation studios about certain characters and plots, these ideas alone cannot be protected and can lead to studios profiting on individual animator's ideas. However, this has not stopped many independent artists from filing claims to characters produced by different studios.

== Animation specialties ==
An example of traditional animation: a horse animated by rotoscoping from Eadweard Muybridge's 19th-century photos

Due to the wide range of animation techniques and styles, many animation studios typically specialize in certain types.

=== Traditional animation ===
Traditional animation employs the use of hand-drawn frames, and is used in the world of animation. Notable studios that specialize in this style include Walt Disney Animation Studios, Studio Ghibli, Cartoon Saloon, Rough Draft Korea, Wang Film Productions, Yowza! Animation, Sunmin Image Pictures, Saerom Animation, Titmouse, TMS Entertainment, Studio Trigger, Sunrise, Bones, Ufotable, Studio Chizu and CoMix Wave Films.

=== Stop-motion animation ===
Stop-motion animation uses objects that are incrementally moved and photographed in order to create an illusion of movement when the resulting frames are played back. Notable studios specializing in this style of animation include Aardman Animations, Laika, Rankin/Bass Animated Entertainment and ShadowMachine.

=== 3D computer animation ===
3D animation is the newest of the animation techniques, using the assistance of computers and software, such as Houdini, to create 3D models that are then manipulated and rendered to create movement. Notable studios include Pixar Animation Studios, DreamWorks Animation, Sony Pictures Imageworks, Blue Sky Studios, Illumination, DNEG, Marza Animation Planet, and Yarnhub.

== See also ==
- List of animation studios
- Computer-generated imagery
- List of movie genres
- List of motion picture topics
- List of anime conventions
- Q-version
- Voice acting in Japan
- Film studio
