= Rough Draft Studios =

American animation studio

Rough Draft Studios, Inc.
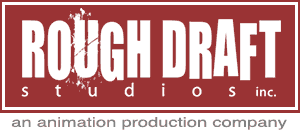
- Type: Private
- Industry: Hand-drawn animation Television production
- Founded: March 20, 1991; 35 years ago in Van Nuys, Los Angeles, California, U.S.
- Founders: Gregg Vanzo; Nikki Vanzo
- Headquarters: 615 Allen Avenue; Glendale, California; 91201, U.S.
- Key people: Gregg Vanzo (President); Scott Vanzo (CTO); Claudia Katz (EVP); Peter Avanzino (Director); Dwayne Carey-Hill (Director); Edmund Fong (Director); Crystal Chesney-Thompson (Director)
- Divisions: Rough Draft Korea; Rough Draft Feature Animation
- Website: roughdraftstudios.com

Rough Draft Studios, Inc. is an American animation studio based in Glendale, California, with a sister studio Rough Draft Korea located in Seoul, South Korea. The studio was founded in Van Nuys, Los Angeles by Gregg Vanzo in 1991.

Rough Draft Studios and its divisions have produced specials, commercials and direct-to-video work for companies such as Warner Bros. Animation, Cartoon Network Studios, 20th Television Animation, MTV Animation, Film Roman, Disney Television Animation and Nickelodeon Animation Studio.

== Founding ==
Rough Draft Studios was founded in a Van Nuys, Los Angeles, California garage by Gregg and Nikki Vanzo. While working on The Ren & Stimpy Show as a contractor for Spümcø, Nikki approached series creator John Kricfalusi, about taking the animation to South Korea, in order to avoid ballooning costs from working with Bob Jaques at Carbunkle Cartoons as well as low-quality work from Lacewood Productions. Nikki founded and runs Rough Draft Korea, which initially produced animation for Ren & Stimpy; they worked on a majority of the series' episodes after the first season.

== Growth in business ==
After working on The Ren & Stimpy Show, many other shows requested the assistance of Rough Draft Korea in animation and ink & paint. In 1992, Rough Draft Studios had produced animation for its first feature film, FernGully: The Last Rainforest. In the same year, the studio began producing animation for The Simpsons and then for Beavis and Butt-Head in 1993. Also in 1993, Gregg's brother Scott Vanzo was brought on board. Rough Draft Korea quickly built a strong portfolio in the animation business with shows like their first series produced outside of South Korea, The Maxx in 1995, which was nominated for an Annie Award. Claudia Katz, who had joined Rough Draft Studios in 1994 to produce The Maxx, and Rich Moore, joining in 1995 after having worked with Gregg on The Simpsons, completed the core of a Rough Draft Studios which would help "drive the cartoon boom of the late ‘90s". It was also in 1995 that Rough Draft Studios moved to Glendale, California, where they enjoyed further success. Peter Avanzino, who was acquainted with the studio during his career, joined in 1998 and stayed a director at the studio.

== Technology ==
Rough Draft Studios is known for its blending of 2-D with computer animation, or non-photorealistic rendering which it first used on The Maxx and further utilized with Matt Groening's projects like Futurama, The Simpsons Movie, a few episodes of The Simpsons after the film and Disenchantment.

== Filmography ==
=== Rough Draft Studios ===
Most projects produced by Rough Draft Studios, Inc. in Glendale, California are also animated overseas by Rough Draft Korea Co., Ltd. in Seoul, South Korea.

==== TV series ====
Show	Year(s)	Client	Notes
1990s
The Maxx	1995	MTV Animation	
Futurama	1999–2003; 2008–2013; 2023–present	The Curiosity Company 20th Television Animation (Note: Credited as 30th Century Fox Television and 30th Television Animation)	
2000s
Baby Blues	2000	Warner Bros. Animation	5 episodes
Star Wars: Clone Wars	2003–2005	Lucasfilm Cartoon Network Studios	
Drawn Together	2004–2007	Double-Hemm Productions Comedy Partners	
Korgoth of Barbaria	2006	Williams Street	TV pilot
Sit Down Shut Up!	2009	Adelaide Productions 20th Century Fox Television	
2010s
Good Vibes	2011	Rough House Pictures Warner Horizon Television MTV Production Development	"Pilot"
Napoleon Dynamite	2012	Hess Films Scully Productions 20th Century Fox Television	
Full English	2012	Two Brothers Pictures	
Coffin Dodgers	2013	Williams Street	TV pilot
Clash-a-Rama	2015–present	Tolerable Entertainment Supercell	Web series
Tarantula	2017	Rough House Pictures Solid Brass; Studio T	
Disenchantment	2018–2023	The ULULU Company Netflix	
2020s
Fired on Mars	2023	Pat & Mike Productions; NN Productions	
Ted: The Animated Series	2026	Universal Global Television; MRC; Fuzzy Door Productions	

==== Films/specials ====
Title	Year	Client	Notes
1990s
The Thief and the Cobbler	1992	The Completion Bond Company	ink-and-paint
RoboCop 3	1993	Orion Pictures	"Johnny Rehab" commercial animation
2000s
Whizzard of Ow	2003	Warner Bros. Animation	theatrical short
Duck Dodgers: Attack of the Drones	2004	Warner Bros. Animation	theatrical short produced in 2003
Futurama: Bender's Big Score	2007	The Curiosity Company; 20th Century Fox Television	direct-to-video
Futurama: The Beast with a Billion Backs	2008	The Curiosity Company; 20th Century Fox Television	direct-to-video
Futurama: Bender's Game	2008	The Curiosity Company; 20th Century Fox Television	direct-to-video
The Pink Panther 2	2009	Metro-Goldwyn-Mayer; Columbia Pictures	opening title sequence only
Futurama: Into the Wild Green Yonder	2009	The Curiosity Company; 20th Century Fox Television	direct-to-video
2010s
How Murray Saved Christmas	2014	Universal Television	TV special
2020s
King Star King!/!/!/	2023	Williams Street	TV special

==== Other ====
- The Simpsons - "Deep, Deep Trouble" music video (overseas animation provided by Anivision)
- MADtv - Spy vs. Spy shorts
- 2003 Wendy's "Go Wild" and Sprint “Duck Naked” commercials starring the Looney Tunes characters, promoting Looney Tunes: Back in Action
- 59th Primetime Emmy Awards - Brian and Stewie Griffin opening number
- Gravity Falls - "Weirdmageddon 3: Take Back The Falls" (ShackTron CG animation)
- Futurama: Worlds of Tomorrow
- DuckTales - "Moonvasion!" (additional animation)

=== Rough Draft Korea ===
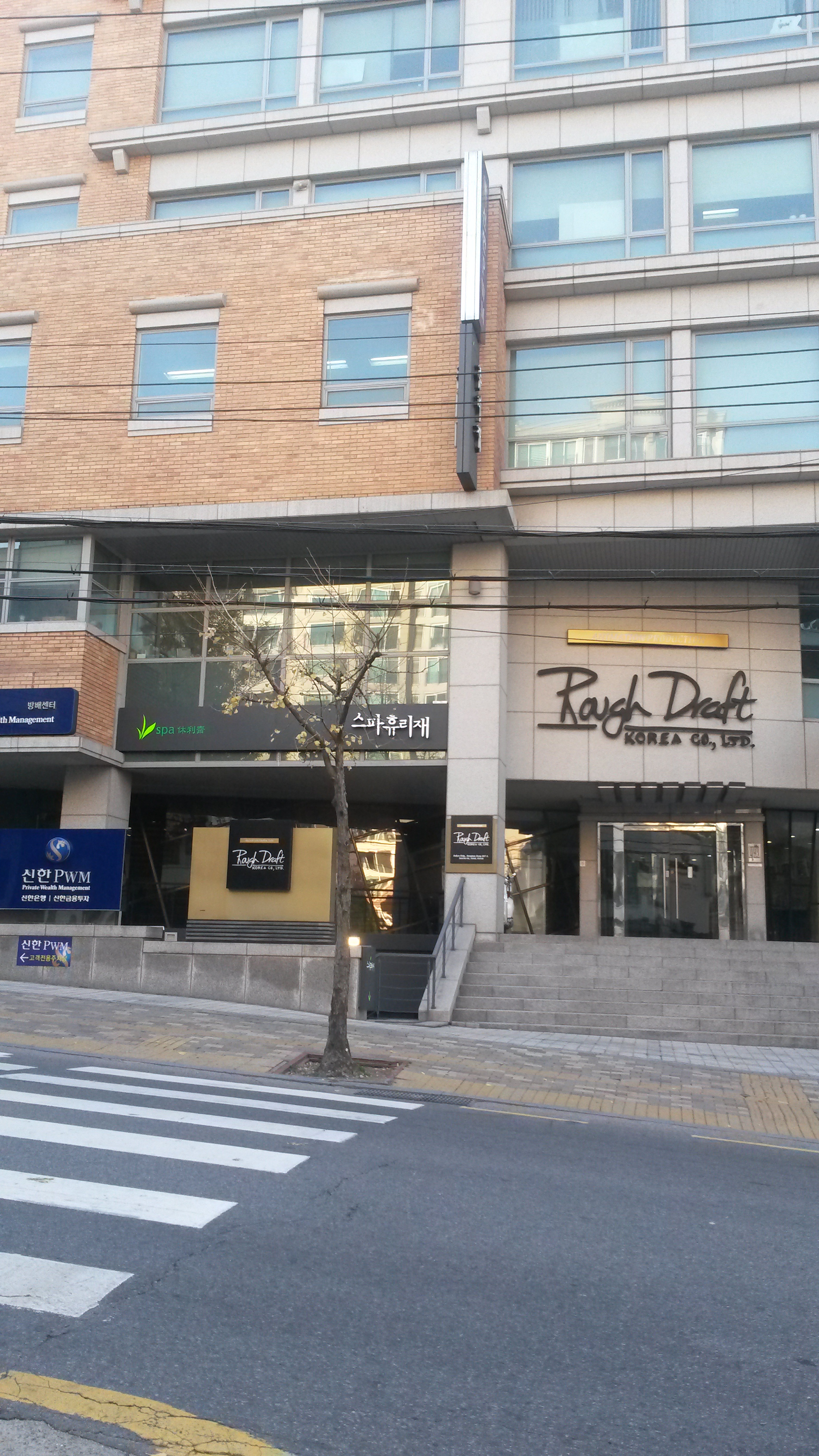
Rough Draft Korea

Rough Draft Korea, RDS' sister studio based in Seoul, South Korea, has produced animation for the following series, features and specials:

==== TV series ====
Show	Year(s)	Client		Notes
1990s
The Ren & Stimpy Show	1992–1995	Spümcø Games Animation		
The Simpsons	1992–present	Gracie Films Film Roman (1992–2016) 20th Television Animation (2016–present)		season 4–present
Beavis and Butt-Head	1993–1997; 2011	MTV Animation		
The Critic	1994–1995	Gracie Films Film Roman		
The Brothers Grunt	1994–1995	A.k.a. Cartoon		
Timon & Pumbaa	1995	Walt Disney Television Animation		8 shorts
Eek! Stravaganza	1995	Film Roman		Klutter! segments only
The Twisted Tales of Felix the Cat	1995–1996	Film Roman		
The Nanny	1995	TriStar Television		"Oy to the World"
Rocko's Modern Life	1996	Joe Murray Productions Games Animation		"Fatal Contraption" and season 4 only with Sunwoo Entertainment
Dexter's Laboratory	1996–1999; 2001–2003	Hanna-Barbera (1996–1998) Cartoon Network Studios (2001–2003)		
Pinky and the Brain	1996–1998	Warner Bros. Animation		
Jumanji	1996	Adelaide Productions		6 episodes of season 1
What a Cartoon!	1996–1997	Cartoon Network Studios		"Buy One, Get One Free*", "The Zoonatiks, in Home Sweet Home"
King of the Hill	1997–2001	Deedle-Dee Productions Judgemental Films 3 Arts Entertainment 20th Television Animation		30 episodes
The Angry Beavers	1997–2001	Gunther-Wahl Productions Nickelodeon Animation Studio		
Happily Ever After: Fairy Tales for Every Child	1997	HBO		8 episodes of season 2
Johnny Bravo	1997	Hanna-Barbera		Season 1 alongside Sunwoo Entertainment
Cow and Chicken	1997–1999	Hanna-Barbera		
I Am Weasel	1997–2000	Hanna-Barbera		
Daria	1998	MTV Animation		Season 2
CatDog	1998–2001	Peter Hannan Productions	Nickelodeon Animation Studio	with Saerom Animation
Oh Yeah! Cartoons	1998–2001	Frederator Studios	Nickelodeon Animation Studio	
The Powerpuff Girls	1998–2005	Hanna-Barbera (1998–2001) Cartoon Network Studios (2002–2005)		
Dilbert	1999–2000	Adelaide Productions		11 episodes
SpongeBob SquarePants	1999–present	United Plankton Pictures	Nickelodeon Animation Studio	
ChalkZone	1999–2000	Frederator Studios	Nickelodeon Animation Studio	season 1
Dragon Tales	1999–2005	Adelaide Productions		Season 2 And 3
2000s
Family Guy	2000–2001	Fuzzy Door Productions 20th Television Animation		eight episodes of season 2 (production order)
The Cartoon Cartoon Show	2000–2001	Cartoon Network Studios		
Sammy	2000	Adelaide Productions		
Jackie Chan Adventures	2000–2002	Adelaide Productions		13 episodes of seasons 1 and 2
Sheep in the Big City	2000–2002	Curious Pictures		
The Oblongs	2001	Film Roman		
Samurai Jack	2001–2004; 2017	Cartoon Network Studios		seasons 1-4 and "XCVIII"
Grim & Evil	2001–2004	Cartoon Network Studios		
Harold and the Purple Crayon	2001–2004	Adelaide Productions		
Kim Possible	2002–2007	Walt Disney Television Animation		22 episodes
Harvey Birdman, Attorney at Law	2002–2003	Williams Street		episodes 2-9
Whatever Happened to... Robot Jones?	2002–2003	Cartoon Network Studios		
3-South	2002–2003	Hentemann Films Warner Bros. Animation	MTV Animation	
Clone High	2002–2003	Touchstone Television Doozer Lord Miller Productions Nelvana	MTV Animation	
My Life as a Teenage Robot	2002–2006	Frederator Studios; Nickelodeon Animation Studio		
Codename: Kids Next Door	2002–2008	Curious Pictures		
The Grim Adventures of Billy & Mandy	2001–2006	Cartoon Network Studios		seasons 1–5
Evil Con Carne	2001–2004	Cartoon Network Studios		
Danny Phantom	2004–2007	Billionfold Inc.	Nickelodeon Animation Studio	
American Dad!	2005	Underdog Productions Fuzzy Door Productions 20th Television Animation		Unaired pilot episode only
The Life & Times of Juniper Lee	2005–2007	Cartoon Network Studios		
Catscratch	2005–2007	Nickelodeon Animation Studio		
Camp Lazlo	2005–2008	Cartoon Network Studios		
Sunday Pants	2005	Cartoon Network Studios		"Periwinkle Around the World"
The X's	2005–2006	Nickelodeon Animation Studio		
Squirrel Boy	2006–2007		Cartoon Network Studios	
Korgoth of Barbaria	2006	Williams Street	Cartoon Network Studios	TV pilot
American Dragon: Jake Long	2006–2007	Walt Disney Television Animation		Season 2
Class of 3000	2006–2008	Cartoon Network Studios		14 episodes
Random! Cartoons	2006–2007	Frederator Studios	Nickelodeon Animation Studio	
The Modifyers	2007		Nickelodeon Animation Studio	TV pilot
Tom and Jerry Tales	2007–2008	Warner Bros. Animation		5 episodes of season 2
Phineas and Ferb	2007–2012	Disney Television Animation		Seasons 1-3
The Replacements	2008–2009	Disney Television Animation		Season 2
The Mighty B!	2008–2011	Paper Kite Productions Polka Dot Pictures Nickelodeon Animation Studio		
The Cartoonstitute	2009	Cartoon Network Studios		
2010s
Adventure Time	2010–2018	Frederator Studios	Cartoon Network Studios	with Saerom Animation
Sym-Bionic Titan	2010–2011	Orphanage Animation Studios	Cartoon Network Studios	
The Looney Tunes Show	2011–2013	Warner Bros. Animation		
Scooby-Doo! Mystery Incorporated	2012	Warner Bros. Animation		"The Night the Clown Cried" and "The Night the Clown Cried II"
Gravity Falls	2012–2016	Disney Television Animation		23 episodes
Ben 10: Omniverse	2012–2014	Cartoon Network Studios		
Nickelodeon Animated Shorts Program	2013–2018	Nickelodeon Animation Studio		"Bug Salad", "Ice Station Zedonk", "Magic Children Doing Things", "Someone Needs to Stop Aunt Phyllis", "Camp Weedonwantcha"
Uncle Grandpa	2013–2017	Cartoon Network Studios		
Steven Universe	2013–2019	Cartoon Network Studios		with Sunmin Image Pictures
Star vs. the Forces of Evil	2015–2019	Disney Television Animation		"Blood Moon Ball", Season 2 until season 4
We Bare Bears	2015–2019	Cartoon Network Studios		with Saerom Animation
Wabbit	2015–2016	Warner Bros. Animation		Season 1
Bug Salad	2016	Nickelodeon Animation Studio		web shorts
Billy Dilley's Super-Duper Subterranean Summer	2017	Disney Television Animation		
Craig of the Creek	2017–2025	Cartoon Network Studios		
Summer Camp Island	2017–2023	Cartoon Network Studios		
Big City Greens	2018–present	Disney Television Animation		with Sugarcube Animation
Amphibia	2019–2022	Disney Television Animation		with Saerom Animation and Sunmin Image Pictures
Steven Universe Future	2019–2020	Cartoon Network Studios		with Sunmin Image Pictures
2020s
The Owl House	2020–2023	Disney Television Animation		with Sunmin Image Pictures and Sugarcube Animation
Chibi Tiny Tales	2020–present	Disney Television Animation		interstitial series
Tig n' Seek	2020–2022	Cartoon Network Studios		
Kamp Koral: SpongeBob's Under Years	2021	United Plankton Pictures Nickelodeon Animation Studio		"Kitchen Sponge", "Outhouse Outrage", "Help Not Wanted", and "Mermaid Men and Barnacle Boys" (2D sequences only)
The Patrick Star Show	2021–present	United Plankton Pictures Nickelodeon Animation Studio		
We Baby Bears	2022–present	Cartoon Network Studios		with Saerom Animation
Chibiverse	2022–present	Disney Television Animation		with Saerom Animation
Hailey's On It!	2023–2024	Disney Television Animation		with Saerom Animation
Adventure Time: Fionna and Cake	2023	Cartoon Network Studios Frederator Studios		Season 1; with Saerom Animation
Jessica's Big Little World	2023–2024	Cartoon Network Studios		with Saerom Animation
Cartoon Cartoons	2026	Cartoon Network Studios		“Afternoon Super”, “Greetings From Samson” and "Unlovable"

==== Films/specials ====
Title	Year	Client	Notes
1990s
FernGully: The Last Rainforest	1992	20th Century Studios; Kroyer Films	
P. J. Sparkles	1992	Mike Young Productions	opening titles
The Bears Who Saved Christmas	1994	Film Roman	
Izzy's Quest for Olympic Gold	1995	Film Roman	
Beavis and Butt-Head Do America	1996	Paramount Pictures; MTV Films; Geffen Pictures; Judgemental Films	overseas animation, 3-D sequences
The Story of Santa Claus	1996	Film Roman	
A Day in the Life of Ranger Smith	1999	Spümcø	
Boo Boo Runs Wild	1999	Spümcø	Uncredited
Dexter's Laboratory: Ego Trip	1999	Hanna-Barbera	
2000s
The Flintstones: On the Rocks	2001	Cartoon Network Studios	
The Powerpuff Girls Movie	2002	Warner Bros. Pictures; Cartoon Network Studios	
Globehunters: An Around the World in 80 Days Adventure	2002	Nickelodeon Animation Studio	produced in 2000
The Electric Piper	2003	Nickelodeon Animation Studio	produced in 2000
Polly Pocket: Lunar Eclipse	2003	Mike Young Productions	
Stitch! The Movie	2003	Disney Television Animation	
The SpongeBob SquarePants Movie	2004	Paramount Pictures; Nickelodeon Movies; United Plankton Pictures	
Inside the CIA	2005	20th Century Studios; Underdog Productions; Fuzzy Door Productions	Short
Kim Possible Movie: So the Drama	2005	Disney Television Animation	
How to Eat Fried Worms	2006	New Line Cinema; Walden Media	Animated sequences
The Simpsons Movie	2007	20th Century Studios; 20th Century Animation; Gracie Films	also co-produced overseas with AKOM
Phineas and Ferb's Musical Cliptastic Countdown	2009	Disney Television Animation	
2010s
Phineas and Ferb: Summer Belongs To You!	2010	Disney Television Animation	
Achmed Saves America	2012	Anchor Bay Entertainment	
Hotel Transylvania	2012	Columbia Pictures; Sony Pictures Animation	End title sequence
Madea's Tough Love	2015	Lionsgate; Tyler Perry Studios; Bento Box Entertainment	
The SpongeBob Movie: Sponge Out of Water	2015	Paramount Pictures; Paramount Animation; Nickelodeon Movies; United Plankton Pictures	2D hand-drawn animated sequences only
Looney Tunes: Rabbits Run	2015	Warner Bros. Animation	
Hotel Transylvania 2	2015	Columbia Pictures; Sony Pictures Animation	End title sequence
Hotel Transylvania 3: Summer Vacation	2018	Columbia Pictures; Sony Pictures Animation	End title sequence
Steven Universe: The Movie	2019	Cartoon Network Studios	
2020s
We Bare Bears: The Movie	2020	Cartoon Network Studios	
