= Saerom Animation =

South Korean animation studio

Saerom Animation, Inc. 새롬 애니메이션
- Industry: Animation
- Founded: 1987; 39 years ago
- Founder: Gilhwan Kim
- Headquarters: Seoul, South Korea
- Products: Feature films, television series
- Services: Animation outsourcing
- Website: http://saeromani.com/saerom-home/

Saerom Animation, Inc. (Korean: 새롬 애니메이션) is an animation studio located in Seoul, South Korea founded in 1987 by Gilhwan Kim. While it mainly animates shows from American animation studios, the company started making its own cartoons in 2003.

== Productions ==
=== TV series ===
Show	Year(s)	Client		Notes
1980s
The Smurfs	1987–1989	Hanna-Barbera		seasons 7–9
1990s
Adventures of Sonic the Hedgehog	1993–1996	Sega	DIC Entertainment	along with Hong Ying Animation, TMS Entertainment, and Rainbow Animation; credited as Sae Rom Production Co. Ltd
Madeline	1993–2001	CINAR	DIC Entertainment	alongside Plus One Animation
Sonic the Hedgehog	1993–1994	Sega	DIC Entertainment	credited as Sae Rom Production Co. Ltd
All-New Dennis the Menace	1993		DIC Entertainment	credited as Sae Rom Production Company, Ltd.
Gargoyles	1994–1997	Disney Television Animation		along with AKOM, Dong Yang Animation, Hanho Heung-Up, Koko Enterprises, Sunmin Image Pictures and Sunwoo Entertainment
Gadget Boy & Heather	1995–1998	DIC Entertainment		along with Hong Ying Animation
The Incredible Hulk	1996–1997	New World Animation Marvel Films		
Salty's Lighthouse	1997–1998	Sunbow Entertainment		
Hey Arnold!	1997–2004	Snee-Oosh, Inc.	Nickelodeon Animation Studio	seasons 2–5, credited as Sae Rom Productions Co. Ltd
CatDog	1998–2005	Peter Hannan Productions	Nickelodeon Animation Studio	along with Rough Draft Korea
2000s
Dora the Explorer	2000–2019	Nickelodeon Animation Studio		
Clerks: The Animated Series	2000–2002	Miramax Television View Askew Productions Woltz International Pictures Corporation Touchstone Television		
Oswald	2001–2003	HIT Entertainment	Nickelodeon Animation Studio	credited as Sae Rom Production Co. Ltd
Go, Diego, Go!	2005–2011		Nickelodeon Animation Studio	
My Gym Partner's a Monkey	2005–2008	Cartoon Network Studios		
Ni Hao, Kai-Lan	2008–2011	Nickelodeon Animation Studio		along with Wang Film Productions
The Marvelous Misadventures of Flapjack	2008–2010	Cartoon Network Studios		2D animation only
2010s
Scooby-Doo! Mystery Incorporated	2010–2011	Warner Bros. Animation		Season 1, along with Lotto, Digital eMation and Dong Woo Animation
Adventure Time	2010–2018	Frederator Studios	Cartoon Network Studios	along with Rough Draft Korea
Regular Show	2010–2017		Cartoon Network Studios	
Sanjay and Craig	2013–2016	Forest City Rockers Nickelodeon Animation Studio		
Clarence	2014–2018	Cartoon Network Studios		
We Bare Bears	2015–2020	Cartoon Network Studios		along with Rough Draft Korea
Danger & Eggs	2015–2017	Amazon Studios		
Long Live the Royals	2015	Cartoon Network Studios		miniseries only
Craig of the Creek	2018–2025	Cartoon Network Studios		along with Rough Draft Korea
Amphibia	2019–2022	Disney Television Animation		along with Rough Draft Korea and Sunmin Image Pictures
Twelve Forever	2019	Puny Entertainment; The Cartel		
2020s
JJ Villard's Fairy Tales	2020	Villard Film Cartoon Network Studios Williams Street		
Adventure Time: Distant Lands	2020–2021	Frederator Studios	Cartoon Network Studios	
The Fungies!	2020–2021		Cartoon Network Studios	
Close Enough	2020–2022		Cartoon Network Studios	
HouseBroken	2021–2023	Kapital Entertainment Bento Box Entertainment		along with Synergy Animation
Animaniacs	2021–2023	Amblin Television Warner Bros. Animation		seasons 2 and 3, along with Digital eMation, Tiger Animation, and Yowza! Animation
We Baby Bears	2022–present	Cartoon Network Studios		along with Rough Draft Korea
Hailey's On It!	2023–2024	Disney Television Animation		along with Rough Draft Korea
Adventure Time: Fionna and Cake	2023–present	Cartoon Network Studios Frederator Studios FredFilms		along with Rough Draft Korea and Digital eMation
Jessica's Big Little World	2023–2024	Cartoon Network Studios		along with Rough Draft Korea
Smiling Friends	2024–2026	Williams Street		Additional animation on three episodes of season 2, full-time services starting with season 3
Chibiverse	2025–present	Disney Television Animation		along with Rough Draft Korea
Regular Show: The Lost Tapes	2026-present	Cartoon Network Studios		

=== Films/specials ===
Title	Year	Client	Notes
1990s
FernGully: The Last Rainforest	1992	20th Century Studios Kroyer Films	overseas ink/paint services, along with Rough Draft Korea, credited as Sae Rom Production Co. Ltd
2000s
Hey Arnold!: The Movie	2002	Paramount Pictures Nickelodeon Movies	animation services, credited as Sae Rom Production Co. Ltd
2010s
Regular Show: The Movie	2015	Cartoon Network Studios	
Hey Arnold!: The Jungle Movie	2017	Nickelodeon Animation Studio	
2020s
Craig Before the Creek	2023	Cartoon Network Studios	

=== Other productions ===
- Bugtime Adventures (alongside Starburst Animation)
- The Adventures of Sam & Max: Freelance Police
- The Avengers
- Aladdin (uncredited) (alongside Sunwoo Entertainment)
- Beetlejuice (uncredited) (alongside Hanho Heung-Up)
- Captain Planet (alongside Dong Woo Animation, Dong Yang Animation, Plus One Animation and Sei Young Animation)
- Cal and Rat (credited as Sae Rom Production Co. Ltd)
- Cartoon Cartoons (A For Angel, Hungy Ghost, I Love You Jocelyn, ISCREAM, Maude Macher and Dom Duck, Mouthwash Madness, Pig in a Wig, Sleeping Giants, The All-Nimal, The Journey To Donut Palace, Tib Tub, We Need You!)
- Commander Cork: Space Ranger
- Darkwing Duck (uncredited) (alongside Hanho Heung-Up and Sunwoo Entertainment)
- Double Dragon (alongside Plus One Animation)
- Dragon Tales (uncredited) (alongside Dong Woo Animation, Rough Draft Korea, Wang Film Productions, Yeson Animation Studios, Sunwoo Entertainment, Lotto Animation, Koko Enterprises and Yearim)
- Go! Cartoons
- Johnny Bravo (Season 4, including the Christmas and Valentine's specials) (alongside Koko Enterprises, Rough Draft Korea and Sunwoo Entertainment)
- Marsupilami (alongside AKOM)
- Mixels: Nixel, Nixel, Go Away
- Monster Farm
- Mouse and the Monster
- NASCAR Superchargers
- Oh Yeah! Cartoons (alongside Rough Draft Korea)
- Paranormal Roommates
- Party Wagon (in collaboration with Sunwoo Entertainment)
- Phantom 2040 (alongside Sei Young Animation)
- The Pink Panther (1993) (alongside Wang Film Productions)
- Sandokan
- Sonic Christmas Blast (credited as Sae Rom Production Co. Ltd)
- Stunt Dawgs
- The Twisted Tales of Felix the Cat (alongside Plus One Animation)
- Trap Universe (credited as Saerom)
- Walter Melon
- What-a-Mess
- Young Robin Hood

== Korean animation ==
Saerom also created these cartoons which were made for Korean audiences.

- Super Zuri: The Galactic Quest (a.k.a. Baby Zuri)
- Dreamy Pensee
