= List of CatDog episodes =

This is a list of episodes from the animated CatDog television series.

== Series overview ==
Sixty-eight episodes from four seasons and one made-for-TV movie, CatDog and the Great Parent Mystery, were produced.

Season	Segments	Episodes	Originally released	
Season	Segments	Episodes	First released	Last released
1	41	20	April 4, 1998	October 29, 1998
2	43	20	February 15, 1999	March 16, 2000
3	38	20	October 9, 1999	May 18, 2001
4	13	8	November 25, 2000	June 15, 2005

== Episodes ==
=== Season 1 (1998) ===
No. overall	No. in season	Title	Animation directed by	Written by	Storyboard by	Original release date	Prod. code
1	1	"Dog Gone"	George Chialtas	Peter Hannan, Derek Drymon & Robert Porter	Derek Drymon & Robert Porter, Robert Porter (director)	April 4, 1998	101
1	1	"Fan Mail"	-	-	-	April 4, 1998	101
1	1	"All You Can't Eat"	George Chialtas	Andy Rheingold	Dominic Orlando, Karen Heathwood, Barry Bunce & Sam Kirson, Derek Drymon (director)	April 4, 1998	101
Dog Gone — Dog puts on a costume to give Cat some time to himself. Fan Mail — In a short created to extend the preceding pilot episode, CatDog read their fan mail, but since Winslow claims there is no mail for them, Dog makes up a wild version of their origin story. All You Can't Eat — CatDog are banned from an all-you-can-eat taco restaurant by Rancid Rabbit, but they find clever ways to sneak back in. However, the ban is lifted after Rancid is fired from his job and CatDog’s friend Dunglap becomes the new manager of the restaurant. Note: The standalone version of "Dog Gone", completed in 1997, preceded pay-per-view broadcasts of Good Burger from April 8 to May 14, 1998.
2	2	"Flea or Die!"	Alan Smart	Andy Rheingold	Derek Drymon (also director)	October 5, 1998	102
2	2	"CatDog Food"	George Chialtas	Lance Khazei & Michael Karnow	Robert Porter & Antoine Guilbaud	October 5, 1998	102
Flea or Die — When CatDog get fleas, Cat chooses to wear a flea belt over taking a bath, but Cat does not want to wear it when the new belt-free fashion trend leaves him pushing it on to Dog to impress the ladies. CatDog Food — Rancid Rabbit makes CatDog the mascot of "CatDog Food", and it goes to Cat's head.
3	3	"The Island"	Alan Smart	Steven Banks	Grey Miller, Barry Bunce (director)	October 6, 1998	107
3	3	"All You Need is Lube"	Gary McCarver	Magda Liolis	Karen Heathwood, Dominic Orlando (director)	October 6, 1998	107
The Island — CatDog are stranded on an island surrounded by traffic. All You Need is Lube — When Cat saves Lube from a tick, Lube becomes his bodyguard.
4	4	"Shriek Loves Dog Work Force"	Alan Smart	Steven Banks Casper Kelly & John Bolton	Gary Goldstein (director) Gary Goldstein (director); Kelly Kennedy	October 7, 1998	110
Shriek Loves Dog — Cat and Winslow set up a date for Dog and Shriek, but the Greasers want Dog to marry her. Work Force — CatDog work in Rancid's cereal factory licking the boxes shut, but when Dog gets promoted to a prize stuffer, he lets the power go to his head.
5	5	"Diamond Fever The Pet"	Russ Mooney George Chialtas	Steven Banks Rick Rodgers & Frank Santopadre	Chuck Klein (director); Antoine Guilbaud Gary Goldstein (director); Erik Wiese	October 8, 1998	109
Diamond Fever — Cat and Dog start mining for diamonds, causing Cat to get a bit greedy. The Pet — CatDog find an injured cockroach and Dog wants to take it home.
6	6	"Party Animal Mush, Dog, Mush!"	George Chialtas Russ Mooney	Rachel Powell Andy Rheingold	Dominic Orlando (director); Karen Heathwood Barry Bunce (director)	October 9, 1998	108
Party Animal — Cat throws a house party, but almost no one shows up. Winslow's party turns out amazing, and everyone else (including Dog) ends up going. Mush, Dog, Mush! — Cat enters Dog in the dogsledding competition and trains Dog to the extreme.
7	7	"Armed and Dangerous Fistful of Mail!"	Tim Long George Chialtas	Dean Stefan Andy Rheingold	Gary Hoffman (director); Karen Heathwood Barry Bunce and Vikki Barrett	October 12, 1998	113
Armed and Dangerous — Cat's pen pal Ingrid is coming to visit him, but he has to disguise Dog as a regular tail because he told Ingrid that he was a normal cat. He also gets his hands stuck in a jar and has to use Dog's hands instead. Fistful of Mail! — Dog tries to bite the butt of the new mailman, who seems to know every trick in the book.
8	8	"Pumped Dummy Dummy"	Alan Smart George Chialtas	Evan Bailey Peter Hannan, Robert Porter, and Antoine Guilbaud	Gary Goldstein and Kelly Kennedy (directors) Robert Porter and Antoine Guilbaud	October 13, 1998	104
Pumped — When the Greasers steal CatDog's frisbee, Dog drinks a muscle-building protein shake so he can fight the Greasers and get their frisbee back. A side effect is that Dog becomes very aggressive. Dummy Dummy — Cat feels threatened when Dog gets a new toy called "Little Cat".
9	9	"Squirrel Dog Brother's Day"	Alan Smart	Chris Kelly & John Bolton Andy Rheingold	Derek Drymon and Gary Goldstein (directors); Kelly Kennedy Gary Goldstein (director); Kelly Kennedy	October 14, 1998	106
Squirrel Dog — Eddie is accidentally glued to Cliff's jacket, causing Cliff to be kicked out of the Greasers. He goes to CatDog for support on how to deal with his new two-headed lifestyle. Brother's Day — CatDog are broke and cannot afford to buy each other a Brother's Day gift.
10	10	"Escape From the Deep End The Collector"	Russ Mooney George Chialtas	Andy Rheingold Steven Banks	Dominic Orlando (director); Kelly Kennedy	October 15, 1998	111
Escape From the Deep End — When Dog breaks the public pool's very strict set of rules, Rancid puts CatDog behind bars. The Collector — Cat becomes obsessed with collecting Mean Bob action figures, but Dog just wants to play with them.
11	11	"Full Moon Fever War of the CatDog"	Gary McCarver Russ Mooney	John Loy Andy Rheingold and Scott Sonneborn	Barry Bunce (director); Greg Miller Chuck Klein (director); Antoine Guilbaud	October 16, 1998	103
Full Moon Fever — Dog's primal instincts come out when he sees the full moon. War of the CatDog — CatDog's family reunion is halted by a battle over a trophy.
12	12	"CatDog's End Siege on Fort CatDog"	Alan Smart	Steven Banks Andy Rheingold	Chuck Klein (director); Antoine Guilbaud Erik Wiese, Roy Wilson, and Karen Heathwood	October 19, 1998	112
CatDog's End — Cat wants to be physically separated from Dog, while Dog wants to be attached to their new friend Randolf. Siege on Fort CatDog — CatDog fight the Greaser Dogs military style.
13	13	"Safety Dog Dog Come Home!"	Tim Long Alan Smart	Andy Rheingold	Gary Goldstein (director)	October 20, 1998	114
Safety Dog — Dog becomes overcautious when Cat reminds him that dogs do not have nine lives like cats do. Dog Come Home! — Dog is tired of Cat's bossiness and runs away.
14	14	"Nightmare CatDogPig"	Russ Mooney Gary McCarver	Andy Rheingold Lance Khazei & Michael Karnow	Derek Drymon and Chuck Klein (directors); Antoine Guilbaud Gary Goldstein (director); Kelly Kennedy	October 21, 1998	105
Nightmare — After watching a scary movie, Dog is terrified of "Toothpickhead". CatDogPig — Cat hires a pig to be a tiebreaker when CatDog vote on things.
15	15	"New Neighbors Dead Weight"	George Chialtas Alan Smart	Steven Banks Andy Rheingold	Gary Hoffman (director); Karen Heathwood	October 22, 1998	115
New Neighbors — Dog thinks his new neighbors might be aliens from outer space. Dead Weight — Cat tries to impress a pair of sisters by appearing on a TV show called "Really Incredible People", but Dog, who did not sleep the night before, is sound asleep when the camera crew shows up.
16	16	"Neferkitty Curiosity Almost Killed the Cat"	George Chialtas Brian Ray	Julia Lewald Andy Rheingold	Chuck Klein (director) Gary Hoffman (director); Karen Heathwood	October 23, 1998	119
Neferkitty — Cat tells Dog a story about ancient Egyptian life. Curiosity Almost Killed the Cat — Dog starts writing in a diary after he sees Cat writing in his own, but Cat breaks the iconic "Don't read other people's diary" rule wanting to know what Dog wrote about him, prompting Winslow to blackmail him.
17	17	"Home is Where the Dirt is New Leash on Life"	Alan Smart Tim Long	Andy Rheingold	Dan Povenmire (director) Dominic Orlando (director); Kelly Kennedy	October 26, 1998	118
Home is Where the Dirt is — CatDog argue with a gopher about what belongs to them below ground. New Leash on Life — Tired of Dog's behavior, Cat puts Dog on a leash for dog walking and treats him like his pet.
18	18	"Just Say CatDog Sent Ya Dog's Strange Condition"	George Chialtas Marlene Robinson May	Steven Banks Dean Stefan	Gary Goldstein (director) Barry Bunce (director); Vikki Barrett	October 27, 1998	117
Just Say CatDog Sent Ya — Farburg bones, a favorite of Dog's, are made illegal, but Cat sets up a speakeasy selling them to make profit, but Dog quickly eats every snack. Dog's Strange Condition — After experiencing an allergic reaction to pecans following a pecan pie eating contest, a tree suddenly sprouts from Dog's head as part of a disease called "pecanitis".
19	19	"Smarter than the Average Dog CatDog Doesn't Live Here Anymore"	George Chialtas Brian Ray	Patti Carr & Lara Runnels Steven Banks	Dan Povenmire (director) Dominic Orlando (director); Kelly Kennedy	October 28, 1998	120
Smarter than the Average Dog — Cat wants to make Dog smarter, so he lets him watch educational videos. Dog soon becomes incredibly smart, but Cat loses almost all of his intelligence as a result. Things get worse when they test the flying machine they built for Nearburg's Invention Convention. CatDog Doesn't Live Here Anymore — CatDog go on vacation to get away from everyone, but in their absence the Greasers and Winslow realize they actually miss CatDog.
20	20	"All About Cat Trespassing"	Marlene Robinson May	Steven Banks Mike Allen	Dominic Orlando (director); Kelly Kennedy Barry Bunce (director); Vikki Barrett	October 29, 1998	116
All About Cat — Cat auditions for the lead role in Rancid's musical "Abe" about Abraham Lincoln. The part goes instead to Dog, and Cat ends up with the role of Abe's donkey. Trespassing — As Dog waits at a fire hydrant for a "trespasser" who marked his territory, Cat tries to get him home when their house catches fire.

=== Season 2 (1999–2000) ===
No. overall	No. in season	Title	Animation directed by	Written by	Storyboard by	Original release date	Prod. code
21	1	"Send in the CatDog Fishing for Trouble Fetch"	Brian Ray George Chialtas Derek Drymon, Robert Porter, and Larry Leichliter	Steven Banks Andy Rheingold Dean Stefan and Andy Rheingold	Barry Bunce (director); Antoine Guilbaud Dan Povenmire and Vikki Barrett Rob Porter, Derek Drymon, Eric Wiese, Vikki Barrett, and Miyuki Hoshikawa	February 15, 1999 February 15, 1999 November 20, 1998 (cinemas); February 15, 1999	201
Send in the CatDog — CatDog enroll in a military-like clown school where Dog excels and Cat does not, but Cat might just have it in him to get one of their hardest cases to smile. Fishing for Trouble — Cat feels guilty after eating Dog's new pet fish, and he ventures inside Dog's mouth in search for it. Fetch — Cat tries to win a contest on the radio.
22	2	"The Lady is a Shriek Dog the Mighty"	George Chialtas Marlene May	Steven Banks Andy Rheingold	Dan Povenmire (director); Vikki Barrett Don Orlando (director); Kelly Kennedy	February 16, 1999	202
The Lady is a Shriek — Shriek tries to become more feminine so she can get Dog to notice her at CatDog’s barbecue party. Dog the Mighty — Rancid Rabbit gives Dog a medal after he saves him from being squashed, and Dog is convinced he is a superhero.
23	3	"Hail the Great Meow Woof Battle of the Bands"	George Chialtas Alan Smart	Dean Stefan Steven Banks	Gary Goldstein (director); Erik Wiese Barry Bunce (director); Vikki Barrett	February 17, 1999	203
Hail the Great Meow Woof — Dog's kite drags him and Cat faraway to an island where they are thought to be gods. But when they crush his statue from when they entered, the Great Rancid wants revenge on them. Battle of the Bands — CatDog enter the Battle of the Bands contest using their own homemade instruments. But the Greasers change all that.
24	4	"Adventures in Greaser Sitting The Cat Club Cat Diggety Dog"	Mike Svayko Marlene May N/A	Dean Stefan Steven Banks Peter Hannan	Jordan Reichek (director); Karen Heathwood Dominic Orlando (director); Kelly Kennedy Barry Bunce (director)	February 18, 1999	204
Adventures in Greaser Sitting — Cliff makes CatDog babysit his niece, but they lose track of her before he gets back. The Cat Club — Cat joins a secret "cats only" society. Cat Diggety Dog — A musical number telling how CatDog get along.
25	5	"Climb Every CatDog Canine Mutiny"	Mike Svayko George Chialtas	Dean Stefan Patti Carr & Lara Runnels	Dan Povenmire (director); Vikki Barrett Barry Bunce and Chuck Klein (directors); Steve Owen	February 19, 1999	205
Climb Every CatDog — Cat wants to climb Mount Nearburg so it can be named after him instead of his old rival Mindy Wonderful. Canine Mutiny — CatDog, Mervis, and Mr. Sunshine end up in a dumpster floating in water, and Cat starts acting like the captain of a pirate ship.
26	6	"Fred the Flying Fish CatDog Divided"	Ron Myrick Russ Mooney	Steven Banks	Jordan Reichek (director); Karen Heathwood Dominic Orlando (director); Kelly Kennedy	February 22, 1999	206
Fred the Flying Fish — Cat tries to disprove a myth about a flying fish. CatDog Divided — Cat and Dog are separated after a magic trick gone wrong from a crooked magician. Now the duo has to find the guy, who's running from the cops.
27	7	"The Unnatural Dog Ate It Dopes on Slopes"	Russ Mooney Alan Smart	Andrew Gottlieb Andy Rheingold	Dan Povenmire (director); Vikki Barrett Chuck Klein (director); Steve Owen	February 23, 1999	207
The Unnatural — Cat and Dog play baseball with the Greasers on opposite teams, but when Cat's skills are not up to bat, he uses a pair of disguises to switch places with ace ball player Dog. Dog Ate It — Cat tries to get Dog to lose weight. Dopes on Slopes — Cat tries to teach Dog how to ski.
28	8	"Spaced Out Nine Lives"	Marlene May	Agi Fodor & Chris Gilligan Andy Rheingold	Barry Bunce and Mario Piluso (directors); Antoine Gilbaud Dominic Orlando (director); Kelly Kennedy	February 24, 1999	208
Spaced Out — Tired of watching the Mean Bob movie over and over again with Dog, Cat tries to sabotage the film, but his attempts put the duo into the movie itself. Nine Lives — While cleaning the attic, Dog accidentally lets loose Cat's eight extra life spirits. Now the duo has to collect them before they destroy all of Nearburg.
29	9	"Dem Bones Winslow's Home Videos You're Fired"	Marlene May Russ Mooney George Chialtas	Steven Banks Dean Stefan and Dan Povenmire Andy Rheingold	Barry Bunce and Scott Wood (directors); Antoine Guilbaud Dominic Orlando and Dan Povenmire (directors); Kelly Kennedy Chuck Klein (director); Steve Owen	February 25, 1999	209
Dem Bones — Dog gets a craving for dinosaur bones when Cat takes him to a museum, but he tells Dog not to eat the bones as they are very old. The bones mysteriously appear in CatDog's house the next morning after Dog dreams about them. Winslow's Home Videos — Winslow shows clips of some of his favorite home videos featuring CatDog's wacky antics. You're Fired — Cat wants to impress Tallulah, a famous movie star, but things go awry when Dog eats some hot peppers in the kitchen and CatDog starts breathing fire.
30	10	"Showdown at Hole 18 Sneezie Dog"	Marlene May	Wendy Reardon Sydnie Suskind	Chuck Klein (director); Steve Owen Gary Hoffman (director); Karen Heathwood	February 26, 1999	210
Showdown at Hole 18 — Cat wants to win a lifetime membership at a golf course, but Rancid Rabbit, the owner, bans him from the premises. Sneezie Dog — Cat and Winslow look to cure Dog's allergies.
31	11	"It's a Wonderful Half Life Shepherd Dog"	Marlene May Mike Svayko	Steven Banks; Story by : Doug Lawrence Steven Banks	Barrington Bunce (director) Jordan Reichek (director); Karen Heathwood	July 26, 1999	212
It's a Wonderful Half Life — Cat and Dog dream about what it would be like if they were just a normal cat and dog. Shepherd Dog — Dog gets a job herding sheep for a Scottish woman.
32	12	"Surfin' CatDog Guess Who's Going to Be Dinner!"	Michael Svayko Russ Mooney	Steven Banks Neil Martin and Steven Banks	Barrington Bunce (director); Paul Young Dominic Orlando (director); Kelly Kennedy	July 27, 1999	211
Surfin' CatDog — Cat enters a surfing competition despite being afraid of water. Guess Who's Going to Be Dinner! — Cat tries to make Dog more civilized, but ends up being the one who needs to be civilized.
33	13	"Dog Power It's a Jungle in Here"	Jamie Diaz George Chialtas	Andy Rheingold; Story by : Peter Hannan Andy Rheingold	Dan Povenmire (director) Chuck Klein (director); Steve Owen	July 28, 1999	213
Dog Power — Cat uses Dog's running speed as a power source and sells it to people in town. It's a Jungle in Here — Dog accidentally turns the CatDog house into a jungle when he uses an entire bag of fertilizer to fill in a patch of grass on the floor.
34	14	"The House of CatDog CatDog Campers"	Mike Svayko Russ Mooney	Steven Banks	Dan Povenmire (director); Octavio Rodriguez Chuck Klein (director); Steve Owen	July 29, 1999	214
The House of CatDog — When Rancid wants to tear down CatDog's house to build a freeway, CatDog explains the house's historical significance. CatDog Campers — CatDog wants to win the "Forest Fire Boy of the Year" award by camping out in their yard, but they have difficulty cooperating with each other.
35	15	"Let the Games Begin Winslow Falls in Love"	George Chialtas Marlene May	Andy Rheingold Neil Martin and Steven Banks	Barrington Bunce (director); Vikki Barrett Dominic Orlando (director); Vikki Barrett	July 30, 1999	215
Let the Games Begin — CatDog must team up with the Greasers to win a competition and be freed from the pound. Winslow Falls in Love — CatDog pairs Winslow up with a female mouse named Sadie Linkletter.
36	16	"Extra! Extra! CatDog Squared"	Russ Mooney Mike Svayko	Andrew Gottlieb and Neil Martin Andrew Gottlieb	Barrington Bunce (director); Paul Young Kelly Kennedy (director); Karen Heathwood	November 13, 1999	218
Extra! Extra! — When Dog chases away all the neighborhood's paper boys, Rancid makes CatDog do the job. CatDog Squared — CatDog meet another conjoined duo named DanStan. This turns out to be a scam as Dan and Stan are just looking for a place to stay, and for something to steal.
37	17	"A Very CatDog Christmas"	Marlene May	Andrew Gottlieb	Dan Povenmire (director); Octavio Rodriguez	November 30, 1999	220
Cat sells himself (and Dog) to Rancid's bratty preschooler niece Rancine as a Christmas gift, but Santa Claus gets angry when he finds out and cancels Christmas. The people of Nearburg are maddened by this, and a hunt for the brothers begins. Guest Stars: Brian Doyle-Murray as Santa Claus
38	18	"Royal Dog Springtime for CatDog"	Russ Mooney Mike Svayko	Dean Stefan Andrew Gottlieb	Scott Wood and Barrington Bunce (directors) Kelly Kennedy (director); Karen Heathwood	March 9, 2000	216
Royal Dog — CatDog find an old museum painting that greatly resembles Dog. Mr Sunshine tells the story of the painting and how it relates to English royalty. Springtime for CatDog — Cat and Dog both fall for a girl named Lorraine the Lemur.
39	19	"A Dog Ate My Homework The End"	George Chialtas Marlene May	Steven Banks	Dominic Orlando (director); Vikki Barrett Scott Wood (director); Steve Owen	March 9, 2000	217
A Dog Ate My Homework — Cat schemes to get rich off having Dog eat people's homework. The End — CatDog notices a skull-shaped cloud in the sky using Winslow's telescope, and they send everyone into panic fearing it means the apocalypse.
40	20	"Cliff's Little Secret Freak Show"	Glenn Lovett Eduardo Soriano	Steven Banks Andrew Gottlieb	Glenn Lovett Eduardo Soriano, Louie Escaurlage, & David Earl	March 16, 2000	219
Cliff's Little Secret — CatDog discovers that Cliff takes ballet lessons. Freak Show — CatDog joins Randolph's freak show, but no one is impressed.

=== Season 3 (1999–01) ===
No. overall	No. in season	Title	Animation directed by	Written by	Storyboard by	Original release date	Prod. code
41	1	"Sumo Enchanted Evening Hotel CatDog"	Russ Mooney George Chialtas	Andrew Gottlieb Steven Banks	Scott Wood (director); Steven Owen Kelly Kennedy (director); Karen Heathwood	October 9, 1999	302
Sumo Enchanted Evening — CatDog overeats after Rancid invites them to try his new buffet restaurant, but the bill is too steep for them to pay. Hotel CatDog — Cat turns the CatDog house into a hotel, but he finds it difficult to keep excellent service.
42	2	"Rodeo CatDog Teeth for Two"	Russ Mooney Arne Wong	Jon Ross	Dan Povenmire (director); Octavio Rodriguez Dominic Orlando (director); Vikki Barrett	October 16, 1999	304
Rodeo CatDog — Rancid hires CatDog to become rodeo stars. Teeth for Two — Cat and Dog learn they affect each other's teeth during a dentist visit. As a result, Cat's teeth become a mess, so he tries to change Dog's diet as well as clean his teeth. When that doesn't work, Dog begins to deliberately mess up Cat's teeth, and Cat takes revenge on Dog.
43	3	"Sweet and Lola Rich Shriek, Poor Shriek"	George Chialtas Eduardo Soriano	Andrew Gottlieb Steven Banks	Dominic Orlando (director); Vikki Barrett Trevor Bentley (director); Glen Lovett	October 23, 1999	307
Sweet and Lola — A zoologist named Lola studies CatDog's way of life, which soon gets out of hand. Rich Shriek, Poor Shriek — Rancid hires CatDog, Cliff, and Lube to cater a fancy party, unaware that the party is for Shriek.
44	4	"CatDogula"	Nelson Recinos and Arne Wong	Steven Banks, Andrew Gottlieb, and Mario Piluso	Dominic Orlando and Scott Wood (directors); Vikki Barrett	October 26, 1999	319
CatDog celebrate Halloween, with Cat dressed as a famous surfer and Dog dressed as a vampire named "CatDogula", little does CatDog know that Nearburg is in great danger by bloodsucking vampire ticks. Now with Dog a vampire, and himself not, Cat has to dump a massive amount of garlic juice onto Dog by midnight, or the whole town might turn into vampires.
45	5	"Remain Seated CatDog Catcher"	Marlene May and Arne Wong George Chialtas	Steven Banks Jon Ross	Kelly Kennedy (director); Karen Heathwood Scott Wood (director); Steven Owen	November 6, 1999	305
Remain Seated — Cat tries to avoid going on a gigantic roller coaster at all costs. CatDog Catcher — When his money bath doesn't fill up to where he wants it, Rancid makes it law that all dogs, and later all animals, in Nearburg have licenses or else they will be captured and forced to pass a very hard test that includes a fee.
46	6	"Talkin' Turkey"	Russ Mooney	Steven Banks	Barry Bunce (director); Paul Young	November 21, 1999	318
Dog tries to save a turkey named Walt from being eaten by Cat and Rancid, but Cat soon takes Dog's side and helps keep their guests' minds on something other than turkey.
47	7	"Shriek on Ice No Thanks for the Memories"	Eduardo Soriano Glen Lovett	Steven Banks Andy Rheingold	David Earl & Louie Escauriaga Glen Lovett	December 4, 1999	303
Shriek on Ice — Shriek leaves the Greaser Dogs to become an ice skater. No Thanks for the Memories — Dog gets amnesia after getting hit in the head, and Cat teaches him to be more like him, only for it to backfire when gets Amnesia again.
48	8	"CatDog 3001 Cloudbursting"	Nelson Recinos Ron Myrick	Steven Banks Robert Lamoreaux and Steven Banks	Dominic Orlando and Scott Wood (directors); Vikki Barrett Barry Bunce (director); Paul Young	December 31, 1999	317
CatDog 3001 — CatDog are sent to the year 3001 to save future Nearburg from Winslow's tyrannical descendant. Cloudbursting — Cat sabotages Lola's rain-making machine to win a contest, but his tanning machine ends up drying out the atmosphere.
49	9	"Fire Dog Dog Show"	Mike Svayko George Chialtas	Jon Ross Steven Banks	Dominic Orlando (director); Vikki Barrett Barry Bunce (director); Paul Young	October 23, 1999	301
Fire Dog — CatDog gets a job at the fire department to get a free meal, but what happens when they're the only one's left to save the day? Dog Show — In order to win a Dog show and win the grand prize to a luxury resort, CatDog puts on a disguise to hide Cat as the butt, but the competition is steep, especially with a scheming repeat entry.
50	10	"The Geekers The Golden Hydrant"	Nelson Recinos Arne Wong	Andrew Gottlieb Vince Cheung & Ben Montanio	Dan Povenmire (director); Octavio Rodriguez Scott Wood (director); Steven Owen	March 23, 2000	308
The Geekers — CatDog and friends form a rival gang to the Greasers called the Geekers. The Golden Hydrant — Dog finds the legendary golden hydrant, but Cat prevents him from marking his territory.
51	11	"Lube in Love Picture This"	George Chialtas Eduardo Soriano	Steven Banks Jon Ross	Paul Young Trevor Bentley (director); David Earl & Louie Escauriaga	March 23, 2000	309
Lube in Love — Lube falls in love with a socialite while working at a service station. CatDog offer to teach Lube to be a gentleman if he can fix their car for free. Picture This — Dog becomes obsessed with taking pictures of everyone, even at their most private moments.
52	12	"Stunt CatDog Greasers in the Mist"	Russ Mooney Nelson Recinos	Steven Banks Andrew Gottlieb	Dominic Orlando (director); Vikki Barrett Kelly Kennedy (director); Karen Heathwood	March 30, 2000	310
Stunt CatDog — CatDog are hired as a stunt double for Randolph, which Cat wants to use as an excuse to kiss Tallula. Greasers in the Mist — CatDog and Lola seek out the Greasers' weaknesses.
53	13	"Doo Wop Diggety CatDogumentary"	Eduardo Soriano Arne Wong	Andrew Gottlieb Steven Banks	Trevor Bentley (director); Glen Lovett Kelly Kennedy (director); Karen Heathwood	March 30, 2000	311
Doo Wop Diggety — Winslow organized a doo-wop singing group composed of the Greasers and CatDog. CatDogumentary — Lola uses the money her boss gave her to make a documentary on CatDog, but has to work with a decreased budget because she spent most of her money on an electric hammock.
54	14	"Kooky Prank Day Back to School"	Arne Wong and Ray Pointer Arne Wong	Jon Ross and Dan Povenmire Steven Banks	Dan Povenmire (director); Octavio Rodriguez Barrington Bunce (director); Paul Young	April 1, 2000	320
Kooky Prank Day — On Kooky Prank Day, Cat is the butt of all the days' pranks until he prepares his ultimate practical joke. Back to School — Cat has never gotten his diploma to attend a school reunion dance, and CatDog must go back to high school for a day for Cat to graduate.
55	15	"Monster Truck Folly CatDog's Gold"	George Chialtas Eduardo Soriano	Vince Cheung & Ben Montanio Jon Ross	Barrington Bunce (director); Paul Young Trevor Bentley (director); David Earl & Louie Escauriaga	November 3, 2000	313
Monster Truck Folly — Dog enters Cat and himself into a monster truck rally, but Cat's competitive side soon gets the best of him. CatDog's Gold — Cat and Lola plot to sell honey made fresh in a beehive, but Dog wants to eat it.
56	16	"Silents Please! Gorilla My Dreams"	Mike Svayko Nelson Recinos	Steven Banks and Dan Povenmire Jon Ross	Dan Povenmire (director); Octavio Rodriguez Scott Wood (director); Steven Owen	May 14, 2001	306
Silents Please! — A double outbreak made up of laryngitis and colorblindness transforms the whole town and the rest of the universe into a scene of a silent film. Gorilla My Dreams — Mervis and Dunglap's pet gorilla ends up at CatDog's house, and later joins the group at the bowling alley.
57	17	"Seeing Eye Dog Beware of Cliff"	N/A Eduardo Soriano	Jon Ross Andrew Gottlieb	Kelly Kennedy (director); Karen Heathwood Glen Lovett and Kay Lovett	May 15, 2001	316
Seeing Eye Dog — Dog is hired to be the seeing eye dog for a rich blind man named Mr. Wolfington. Beware of Cliff — Cliff gets trapped under an enormous pile of weights at the gym. He says that if he ever escapes, he will change his mean ways, and he eventually does so after becoming skinny.
58	18	"Rinky Dinks Hypno-Teased"	Russ Mooney	Jon Ross	Dan Povenmire (director); Octavio Rodriguez	May 16, 2001	312
Rinky Dinks — CatDog and friends challenge the Greasers to ice hockey on the frozen Lake Nearburg. Hypno-teased — Winslow uses Dog's new hypnotism kit to trick Cat into thinking he is invincible.
59	19	"CatDog Candy Movin' on Up"	Arne Wong Nelson Recinos	Steven Banks Vince Cheung & Ben Montanio	Dominic Orlando (director); Vikki Barrett Scott Wood (director)	May 17, 2001	314
CatDog Candy — CatDog accidentally makes the greatest candy ever while feuding about their lunch choice. Movin' on Up — CatDog learn that their uncle HorseDuck has died and willed them his lake, and they pack up everything they own to move there.
60	20	"New Cat in Town CatDog's Booty"	Russ Mooney N/A	Vince Cheung & Ben Montanio Steven Banks	Dan Povenmire (director); Octavio Rodriguez Glen Lovett and Kay Lovett	May 18, 2001	315
New Cat in Town — Eddie is outraged when Cliff will not allow him to sit with the Greasers at the movies. The next day, CatDog are introduced to Big Cat, who wants to pound the Greasers. CatDog's Booty — After Cat reads Dog a bedtime story about pirates, they become intrigued by the idea of finding the fabled lost treasure.

=== Season 4 (2000; 2003–05) ===
This season is the shortest, having 8 episodes (6 if counting "CatDog and the Great Parent Mystery" as one episode). 2 episodes did not make it to air in the United States. The series' cancellation in 2001 may be why the final episodes were delayed for several years from airing.

No. overall	No. in season	Title	Animation directed by	Written by	Storyboard by	Original release date	Prod. code
61 62 63	1 2 3	"CatDog and the Great Parent Mystery"	Nelson Recinos	Steven Banks, Robert Lamoreaux, and Victor Wilson	Vikki Barrett, Mario D'Anna, Dominic Orlando, Jordan Reichek, Octavio Rodriguez, Eric Sanford, and Rhoydon Shishido	November 25, 2000	401 402 403
The Nearburg parent day festival is happening and CatDog is feeling left out. Dog eventually convinces Cat to go on a parent hunt. Along the way, they run into aliens, a sea monster, fire ants, and hillbillies. Eventually, they find their parents, a frog and Sasquatch, only to be told they do not know where CatDog came from and that they are CatDog's foster parents; it turns out they were separated by a tornado when CatDog was a baby. Since then, they have searched for their true parents. Winslow then shows up confronting them for leaving, but when offered to stay, he rejects the idea and leaves. Suddenly, the Greaser Dogs and the other characters they have met gang up on them for the trouble they've caused. Luckily, they are flown back to Nearburg by another tornado. Everyone else was gobbled up by the sea monster that popped up afterward. Guest Stars: Billy Bob Thornton as Frog and Jane Krakowski as Sasquatch
64	4	"Harasslin' Match Dog the Not-So-Mighty"	Nelson Recinos	John Crane Robert Lamoreaux	Dominic Orlando (director); Rhoydon Shishido Paul McEvoy (director); Vikki Barrett	June 15, 2003	404
Harasslin' Match — Winslow's niece and nephew humiliate their uncle and force him to leave the house, following Winslow's family tradition. Dog the Not-So-Mighty — Cat refuses to be Dog's superhero sidekick anymore, but then he realizes how popular "Mighty Dog Day" is and wants his position back. Guest Stars: Peter MacNicol as Runt and Kathy Kinney as Brat.
65	5	"Mean Bob, We Hardly Knew Ye CatDog in Winslowland"	Nelson Recinos Russ Mooney	Steven Banks	Kelly Armstrong (director); Octavio Rodriguez Jordan Reichek (director); Octavio Rodriguez and Mario D'Anna	Unaired	405
Mean Bob, We Hardly Knew Ye — Dog starts a fight at the Mean Bob theater production and causes the actor who plays Mean Bob to lose his memory. CatDog brings him back to their house only for Dog to make him think he is the real Mean Bob. CatDog in Winslowland — Cat tricks Dog into going into Winslow's house, where they learn of Winslow's secret life.
66	6	"Cat Gone Bad The Old CatDog and the Sea"	Nelson Recinos	Robert Lamoreaux John Crane	Dominic Orlando (director); Rhoydon Shishido Mario D'Anna (director); Eric Sanford	May 30, 2004	406
Cat Gone Bad — CatDog's "cool" new cat neighbors keep CatDog awake at night, and soon Cat wants to be just as cool as them. The Old CatDog and the Sea — While appearing on a talk show named "Talkin' with Tallulah", CatDog make up a tale about a catdog who hunts a swordfish named Saw-Nose.
67	7	"Cone Dog The Ballad of Ol' 159"	Mike Svayko Nelson Recinos	Robert Lamoreaux John Crane	Mario D'Anna (director); Eric Sanford Kelly Armstrong (director); Octavio Rodriguez	Unaired	407
Cone Dog — Dog is forced to wear a cone on his head after experiencing an ear injury. The Ballad of Ol' 159 — Pete the Polecat sings a ballad about a garbage truck called Ol' 159.
68	8	"Vexed of Kin Meat Dog's Friends"	Nelson Recinos Mike Svayko	Barry Stringfellow Steven Banks	Dominic Orlando (director); Rhoydon Shishido Paul McEvoy (director); Vikki Barrett	June 15, 2005	408
Vexed of Kin — Cat thinks his parents love Dog more than him. Meat Dog's Friends — Dog finds out that meat comes from animals, which causes him to have a crisis of conscience since his friends are animals. Guest Stars: Billy Bob Thornton as Frog and Jane Krakowski as Sasquatch
