= CatDog =

American animated television series

- Genre: Animated sitcom; Comedy; Slapstick; Surreal humour
- Created by: Peter Hannan
- Creative director: Robert Porter
- Voices of: Jim Cummings; Tom Kenny; Carlos Alazraqui; Maria Bamford; Billy West; Nika Futterman; John Kassir; Dwight Schultz; Laraine Newman
- Theme music composer: Peter Hannan
- Opening theme: "CatDog Theme Song"
- Ending theme: "CatDog Theme Song"
- Composer: Denis M. Hannigan
- Country of origin: United States
- Original language: English
- No. of seasons: 4
- No. of episodes: 68 (Note: Includes 134 segments. Two episodes were unaired on television.) (list of episodes)

Production
- Executive producer: Peter Hannan
- Producers: Mario Piluso; Ken Kessel
- Running time: 23 minutes
- Production companies: Peter Hannan Productions; Nickelodeon Animation Studios

Original release
- Network: Nickelodeon
- Release: April 4, 1998 – June 15, 2005

CatDog is an American animated sitcom created by Peter Hannan for Nickelodeon. It follows the zany hijinks of a cat and dog who are inexplicably conjoined at the waist. Nickelodeon produced the series from Burbank, California. The first episode aired on April 4, 1998, following the 1998 Kids' Choice Awards, before the series officially premiered on October 5, 1998. Similarly, the Season 2 episode "Fetch" was shown in theaters in 1998 before airing on television.

The series ended on June 15, 2005, after a total of four seasons and 68 aired episodes over seven years, plus two produced episodes that never aired. It was produced by Nickelodeon Animation Studio in association with Peter Hannan Productions.

Two animation studios, Saerom Animation and Rough Draft Korea, provided the overseas animation for the series.

== Premise ==
CatDog is set in a world of mostly anthropomorphic animals and follows the adventures of a cat and a dog who share a body despite having opposite personalities. Cat is strait-laced and intellectual whereas Dog is impulsive and happy-go-lucky. While the brothers can independently control their upper bodies with two heads, they are conjoined at the midsection, meaning they have no tail or hind legs. Cat and Dog's personality differences share similarities with The Odd Couple, the Looney Tunes shorts and elements of Laurel and Hardy, Abbott and Costello and fellow Nicktoon characters Ren and Stimpy. Because Cat and Dog cannot be separated, Dog will often drag his brother into activities Dog enjoys, such as chasing garbage trucks, eating fast food and exploring, even though Cat is reluctant to do so.

== Episodes ==
Season	Segments	Episodes	Originally released	
Season	Segments	Episodes	First released	Last released
1	41	20	April 4, 1998	October 29, 1998
2	43	20	February 15, 1999	March 16, 2000
3	38	20	October 9, 1999	May 18, 2001
4	13	8	November 25, 2000	June 15, 2005

== Characters ==
- CatDog (Cat voiced by Jim Cummings and Dog voiced by Tom Kenny), a cat and a dog conjoined hybrid twin brothers with a very long and stretchy upper body, having no tail or hind legs.
- Winslow Oddfellow (voiced by Carlos Alazraqui), a tailless blue mouse who lives next door.
- Cliff Feltbottom (voiced by Tom Kenny), a male bulldog, the leader of the Greaser Dogs and one of the main antagonists of the show. His full name is Clifford Maurice Feltbottom.
- Shriek Dubois (voiced by Maria Bamford), a female poodle who falls in love with Dog.
- Lube (voiced by Carlos Alazraqui), a male hound who is dumbest of the trio.
- Rancid Rabbit (voiced by Billy West), a green rabbit.
- Eddie the Squirrel (voiced by Dwight Schultz), a gray squirrel. He wants to be an official Greaser, but unfortunately Eddie isn't a dog.
- Randolph Grant (voiced by Billy West) he is a recurring secondary character who has a celebrity lifestyle and is based on actor Cary Grant.
- Tallulah Headbank (voiced by Maria Bamford) she is a recurring character whom Cat has had a crush on.
- Mean Bob (voiced by Billy West) is a fictional super-hero and Dog's favorite hero. Dog is an expert on him, having watched his movies, played his videogames , and collected his toys.
- Lola Caricola (voiced by Nika Futterman)
- The Ingrid Twins (both voiced by Laraine Newman)
- Mervis and Dunglap (voiced by John Kassir), a pig and a weasel, respectively.
- Mr. Sunshine (voiced by Billy West)

== Production ==
The series, created by Peter Hannan, was developed as the next Nicktoons production and produced from Nickelodeon Animation Studio in Burbank, California. Hannan served as executive producer. This was part of Nickelodeon's $350 million investment in original animation over the next five years after the series' inception.

Albie Hecht, Nickelodeon's senior vice president of worldwide productions, said that the creators planned for the series to "really play off of kids' sympathies" by portraying the characters as experiencing "the worst of both worlds". Hannan said CatDog was inspired by watching neighborhood cats and dogs occasionally fight each other, and thought that it would be great to make conjoined twins Cat and Dog to see how both of the animals would fare against other things. The idea of them being conjoined twins came from Hannan watching several news stories on TV about conjoined twins living a normal life conjoined together. Both aspects, he claimed, initially developed the idea of CatDog.

The title characters were originally envisioned as a two-headed superhero called "Amazing CatDog Man."

== Broadcast ==
The series originally aired on Nickelodeon in the United States from 1998 to 2005, and aired reruns from 2005 to 2007. It was subsequently aired on Nicktoons from May 1, 2002, to August 23, 2011. CatDog began airing on NickRewind on March 23, 2013 and continued to air until November 15, 2021. The series became available for streaming on Paramount+ on July 30, 2020. In the UK and Ireland, the series was broadcast on Nickelodeon (1998–2005), Channel 4 (1999–2007), and Nicktoons (2002–13). In Canada, the series was broadcast on Nickelodeon (2009–2019) and on YTV (1998–2006). In Australia and New Zealand, the series was broadcast on Nickelodeon (1998–2015). In Japan, the series was broadcast on Nickelodeon (1999–2009) and on TV Asahi (1999–2006). In the Middle East, the series was broadcast on Nickelodeon Arabia (2008–2011) and on MBC 3 (2014–2015).

== Reception ==
=== Critical ===
The series was reviewed by Common Sense Media with a score of 2/5 stars, advised for children 7 and up.

=== Awards and nominations ===
In 1998, the series was nominated for an Annie Award for Outstanding Individual Achievement for Writing in an Animated Television Production, for "Dog Gone". The recipients would have been Derek Drymon, Robert Porter and Peter Hannan.

At the 1999 Kids' Choice Awards, the show was nominated for Favorite Cartoon. However, it lost to Rugrats. It did so again in the 2000 Kids' Choice Awards.

== Merchandise ==
=== Home media and digital download releases ===
Two VHS tapes of the series were released by Paramount Home Video on March 30, 1999. Together Forever contains a bonus short "Cat-Diggety Dog" plus the episodes "Dog Gone", "Flea or Die", "Diamond Fever", "CatDog's End" and "Work Force", and CatDog vs. The Greasers contains the episodes "Siege on Fort CatDog", "Squirrel Dog", "Full Moon Fever", "Shriek Loves Dog" and "All You Need Is Lube".

VHS releases
Title	No. of episodes	Release date	Episodes include	
Together Forever	6	March 30, 1999	2x04c	"Cat-Diggety Dog"
Together Forever	6	March 30, 1999	1x01a	"Dog Gone"
Together Forever	6	March 30, 1999	1x02a	"Flea or Die"
Together Forever	6	March 30, 1999	1x05a	"Diamond Fever"
Together Forever	6	March 30, 1999	1x12a	"CatDog's End"
Together Forever	6	March 30, 1999	1x04b	"Work Force"
CatDog vs. The Greasers	5	March 30, 1999	1x12b	"Siege on Fort CatDog"
CatDog vs. The Greasers	5	March 30, 1999	1x09a	"Squirrel Dog"
CatDog vs. The Greasers	5	March 30, 1999	1x11a	"Full Moon Fever"
CatDog vs. The Greasers	5	March 30, 1999	1x04a	"Shriek Loves Dog"
CatDog vs. The Greasers	5	March 30, 1999	1x03b	"All You Need Is Lube"

In 2010, Nickelodeon contracted Amazon.com's CreateSpace service arm to produce DVD sets of CatDog and other Nickelodeon shows exclusively for sale on Amazon. The DVDs were "manufactured-on-demand" DVD-Rs to match orders. The series is also available for download on Amazon's InstantVideo service. From 2011 to 2013, Shout! Factory released the series on DVD via several season sets, and a proper complete series set was released on December 9, 2014.

CreateSpace Releases
Title	Release date	Discs	Episodes
Season 1	April 7, 2010	4	20
Season 2, Volume 1	December 1, 2010	3	17
Season 2, Volume 2	December 1, 2010	4	17
Season 3	December 1, 2010	3	13

Region 1
Title	Season(s)	Episodes	Release date	Episodes
Volume 1: Season 1, Part 1	1	10	October 18, 2011	1 ("Dog Gone" / "Fan Mail" / "All You Can't Eat") – 6 ("Party Animal" / "Mush, Dog, Mush!"), 8 ("Pumped" / "Dummy Dummy"), 9 ("Squirrel Dog" / "Brother's Day"), 11 ("Full Moon Fever" / "War of the CatDog") and 14 ("Nightmare" / "CatDogPig")
Volume 2: Season 1, Part 2	1	10	March 27, 2012	7 ("Armed and Dangerous" / "Fistful of Mail!"), 10 ("Escape From the Deep End" / "The Collector"), 12 ("CatDog's End" / "Siege on Fort CatDog"), 13 ("Safety Dog" / "Dog Come Home!"), 15 ("New Neighbors" / "Dead Weight") – 20 ("All About Cat" / "Trespassing")
Volume 3: Season 2, Part 1	2	10	June 5, 2012	21 ("Send in the CatDog" / "Fishing for Trouble" / "Fetch") – 30 ("Climb Every CatDog" / "Canine Mutiny")
Volume 4: Season 2, Part 2	2	10	September 25, 2012	31 ("It's a Wonderful Half Life" / "Shepherd Dog") – 40 ("Cliff's Little Secret" / "Freak Show")
Volume 5: The Complete Third Season (Note: Shout! Factory select title sold exclusively through Shout's online store.)	3	20	March 12, 2013	41 ("Sumo Enchanted Evening" / "Hotel CatDog") – 60 ("New Cat in Town" / "CatDog's Booty")
Volume 6: The Complete Final Season	4	8	August 20, 2013	61–63 ("CatDog and the Great Parent Mystery") – 68 ("Vexed of Kin" / "Meat Dog's Friends")
The Complete Series	1–4	68	December 9, 2014	1 ("Dog Gone" / "Fan Mail" / "All You Can't Eat") – 68 ("Vexed of Kin" / "Meat Dog's Friends")

The complete series is also available for download in the iTunes Store and streaming on Paramount+.

In Australia, seasons 1–3 were released on DVD by Beyond Home Entertainment.

=== Promotions ===
Nickelodeon initiated a $20 million promotional campaign for the series' first season in 1999 with partners Burger King, Duracell, Jell-O, and Nabisco. Burger King, which had promoted Nickelodeon's The Rugrats Movie with toys the previous year, offered CatDog-themed toys in its kids meals for five weeks beginning February 22, 1999. Nickelodeon promoted a trip to Universal Studios Florida as a prize in an on-air sweepstakes sponsored by Burger King and Mattel, which also released a line of CatDog toys that year. Duracell held a back-to-school-themed backpack offer as well as a "Catch CatDog" sweepstakes on television and radio during the holiday season. Jell-O packaged CatDog stickers in its Jell-O Yogurt kids packs. Nabisco marketed limited edition CatDog Cheese Nips flavors, which featured instant-win contest prizes that included a trip to Los Angeles to meet and have their likeness drawn by creator of CatDog.

=== Video games ===
On May 13, 1999, Nickelodeon and Hasbro Interactive announced a three-year partnership to publish video games based on Nickelodeon television series, the first being CatDog: Quest for the Golden Hydrant for Microsoft Windows, which released in late 1999. Ports of the game for PlayStation and Game Boy Color were mentioned but ultimately never released. Another Hasbro title, CatDog: Saving Mean Bob, was announced for a 2000 release for PC and PlayStation but never released.

Characters from the series appeared as cameos or playable characters in the Nickelodeon games Nicktoons Racing, Super Brawl Universe, Nickelodeon Kart Racers 2: Grand Prix, Nickelodeon All-Star Brawl, Nickelodeon Extreme Tennis, and Nickelodeon Kart Racers 3: Slime Speedway. Characters make cameo appearances in Nickelodeon Party Blast, Nicktoons: Attack of the Toybots, and Nicktoons MLB.
