= Sunmin Image Pictures =

South Korean animation studio

Sunmin Image Pictures Co., Ltd. 선민동화
- Industry: Animation
- Founded: 1990; 36 years ago
- Headquarters: South Korea

Sunmin Image Pictures Co., Ltd. (abbreviated as SMIP Co., Ltd.; Korean: 선민동화; RR: Seonmin Donghwa) is a South Korean animation studio. It was founded as Artplus in 1990. The studio animates many American animated television series and movies, most notably 101 Dalmatians: The Series for ABC and Ben 10 franchise (both original and reboot) for Cartoon Network.

== Shows ==
Show	Year(s)	Co-production(s)
Gargoyles	1995	Walt Disney Television Animation
Timon & Pumbaa	1995–1996	Walt Disney Television Animation
Jungle Cubs	1996	Walt Disney Television Animation
Captain Simian & the Space Monkeys	1996–1997	Hallmark Entertainment
101 Dalmatians: The Series	1997–1998	Walt Disney Television Animation
Hercules: The Animated Series	1998–1999	Walt Disney Television Animation
Roswell Conspiracies: Aliens, Myths and Legends	1999–2000	Epoch Ink Animation
Buzz Lightyear of Star Command	2000	Walt Disney Television Animation
Megas XLR	2004–2005	Cartoon Network Studios
Ben 10	2005–2008	Cartoon Network Studios
The Boondocks	2005–2014	Sony Pictures Television
American Dragon: Jake Long	2006–2007	Walt Disney Television Animation
Ben 10: Alien Force	2008–2010	Cartoon Network Studios
Ben 10: Ultimate Alien	2010–2012	Cartoon Network Studios
Generator Rex	2010–2013	Cartoon Network Studios
Ben 10: Omniverse	2012–2014	Cartoon Network Studios
Black Dynamite	2012	Titmouse
Avengers Assemble	2013–2017	Marvel Animation
Steven Universe	2013–2019	Cartoon Network Studios
Turbo Fast	2014–2016	Titmouse; DreamWorks Animation Television
Guardians of the Galaxy	2015–2019	Marvel Animation
The Powerpuff Girls	2016–2019	Cartoon Network Studios
Ben 10	2016–2021	Cartoon Network Studios
Justice League Action	2016	Warner Bros. Animation
OK K.O.! Let's Be Heroes	2017–2019	Cartoon Network Studios
Victor and Valentino	2019–2022	Cartoon Network Studios
Amphibia	2019	Disney Television Animation
Infinity Train	2019–2021	Cartoon Network Studios
Steven Universe Future	2019–2020	Cartoon Network Studios
The Owl House	2020	Disney Television Animation
ThunderCats Roar	2020	Warner Bros. Animation
Cartoon Cartoons	2026	Cartoon Network Studios
Among Us	2026	Titmouse
