= Peter Hannan (producer) =

American singer-songwriter, animator, and producer (born 1954)

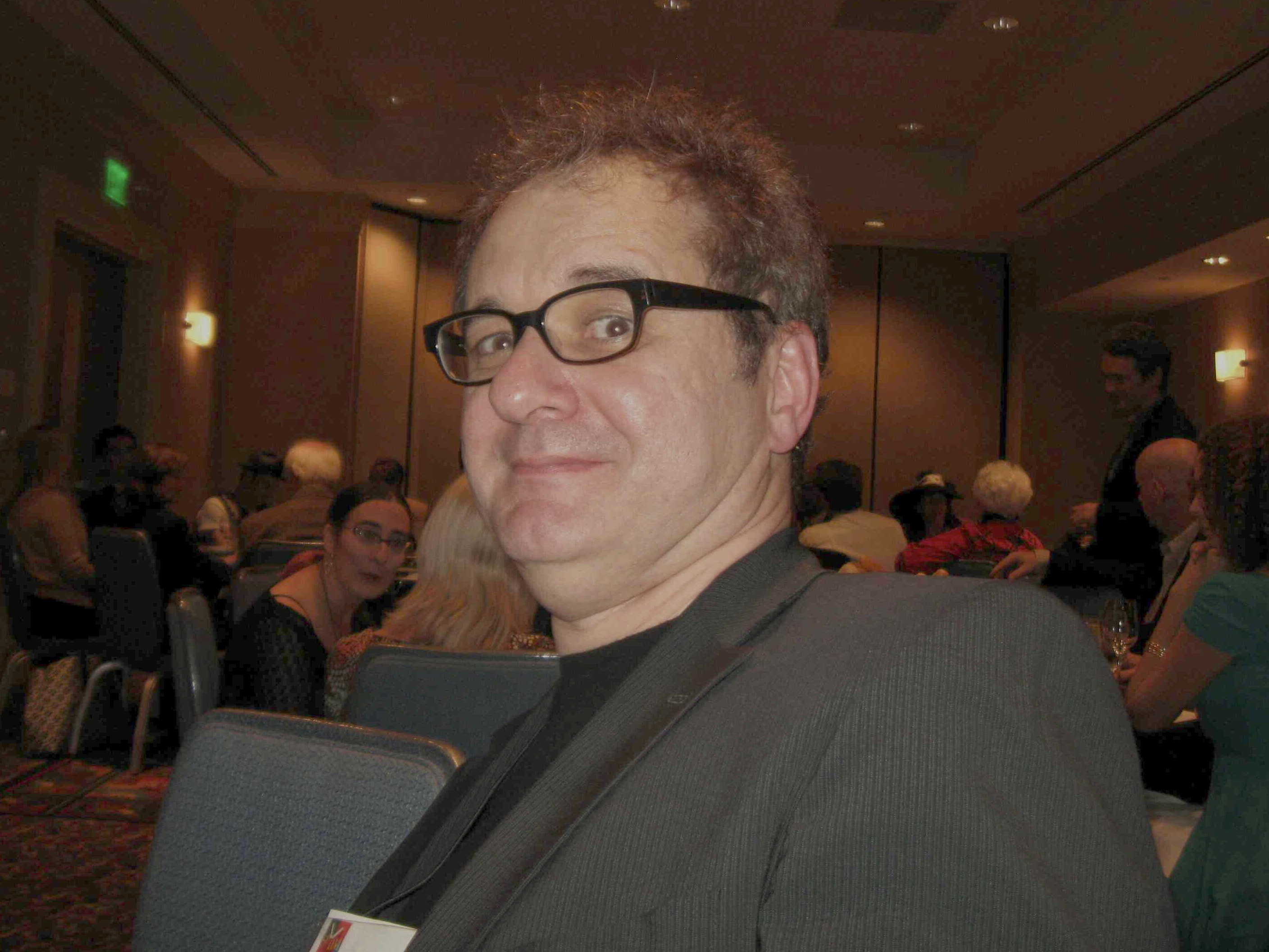
- Born: August 13, 1954 (age 72); Newark, New York, U.S.
- Education: Goddard College
- Occupations: Television producer; animator; educator; author; singer-songwriter
- Years active: 1992–present
- Known for: CatDog; Pound Puppies; Let's Go Luna!
- Website: https://peterhannanland.squarespace.com/

Peter John Hannan (born August 13, 1954) is an American producer, animator, singer-songwriter, educator and author. He is the creator of the Nickelodeon animated series CatDog, for which he also performed and wrote the accompanying theme song. He also was the producer, story editor, and songwriter of the PBS Kids animated series Let's Go Luna!.

He created the web series Really Freaking Embarrassing. His single-panel cartoon The Adventures of a Huge Mouth ran in independent newspapers and magazines in Harper's, Esquire and others. He writes and illustrates books, including Petlandia, My Big Mouth: 10 Songs I Wrote That Almost Got Me Killed, The Greatest Snowman in the World, Super Goofballs, Sillyville or Bust, Escape from Camp Wannabarf, School After Dark: Lessons in Lunacy, The Battle of Sillyville: Live Silly or Die! And Freddy! King of Flurb.

He co-founded the company FutureVision, which produced a TV concert series featuring blues artist Muddy Waters, Albert King, Buddy Guy & Junior Wells, Bobby Bland, Otis Rush, and Blind John Davis.

Hannan has taught, lectured, and led art, writing, animation, and creativity workshops for pre-school through college students. He has worked as a graphic designer and art director and created illustrations for magazines, newspapers, and advertising. He exhibits paintings, illustrations, and cartoons.

== Works ==
- CatDog – Creator
- Figure It Out – Writer
- Pound Puppies – Writer
- Really Freaking Embarrassing – Creator
- Let's Go Luna! – Writer
- Max & Maple: The Can-Do Kids – Writer
- Phoebe & Jay – Producer of Live Action Interstitials
