= Ren's Retirement =

- The Ren & Stimpy Show episode
- Episode no.: Season 3 Episode 11
- Directed by: Bob Camp
- Written by: Jim Gomez; Ron Hauge; Bill Wray
- Production code: RS-311
- Original air date: April 2, 1994

Guest appearances
- Jack Carter as Wilbur Cobb; Alan Young as Haggis MacHaggis

Episode chronology
← Previous "Road Apples"	Next → "Jerry the Bellybutton Elf"

"Ren's Retirement" is the eleventh episode of the third season of The Ren & Stimpy Show. It originally aired on Nickelodeon in the United States on April 2, 1994.

== Plot ==
Stimpy makes a birthday cake for Ren, who returns home after chopping firewood. Ren demonstrates his strength by juggling heavy objects and tearing their sofa apart, thinking he is at his prime; he saves Mrs. Buttloaves after she and a bus to The Bronx falls onto the house. It is revealed to be Ren's tenth birthday (seventy in dog years); Ren, being in denial of his old age, trying to make himself feel better, but his body continuously deteriorates from the excessive strength he had used without this knowledge. He forces the cake into Stimpy. Ren is horrified by his appearance, prompting Stimpy to vomit out the cake in disgust. Ren could not make himself hit Stimpy due to his muscles giving out.

Stimpy tries to feed a senile Ren; Ren, having suffered from suppressed post-traumatic stress disorder, believes it to be an actual battle, spitting food everywhere. Stimpy is covered with the food, which makes Ren confuse him with a Colonel he knew; he tries to strangle Stimpy to no avail.

The next day, Stimpy tries to introduce golf to Ren. He hits the ball, hitting Ren twice in the process, only for it to hit Haggis MacHaggis in the head. Stimpy lets Ren try golf, with Haggis believing Ren to have maimed him; as Ren does not respond, he pours all of his golf clubs onto his mouth as retribution. Stimpy continues to golf while Ren sits aside, noting the beauty of the nearby graveyard while complementing the grim Reaper as his friend.

The duo go to the nearby mortuary, where Stimpy demands a coffin for Ren. The Salesman is not satisfied with their budget of 5 dollars, so he orders his assistant Kowalski to stuff Ren in a newspaper and run him over; per Stimpy's demands for a more traditional method, Ren is stuffed into an almond opener. Ren is dissatisfied and assaults the Salesman, who reluctantly allows him to bury him in an apartment that resembles a coffin, advertised by chippendale dancers.

A "funeral" for Ren is held, where Stimpy and Chippendales dancers cry while Wilbur Cobb directs; he is similarly senile and cannot direct it properly, but revels in the fact he will outlive everyone else in the ceremony. Unable to cope without Ren, Stimpy moves in to the coffin with all their belongings. The apartment is buried under Ren's gravestone, where they live a peaceful life, but a worm comes in to devour the duo's innards; the duo barely survive, ending the episode.

== Cast ==
- Billy West as Ren, Stimpy and Salesman (That Guy)
- Alan Young as Haggis MacHaggis
- Jack Carter as Wilbur Cobb and The Worm

== Production ==
The episode originated in 1993 when Bill Wray declared that he would "really love to do a feature-length animated horror film". Wray's desire to do a horror-filmed episode became "Ren's Retirement". Much of the episode was based on the body horror genre, heavily inspired by films of both John Carpenter and David Cronenberg (particularly Scanners, The Thing, The Fly, and They Live), as Ren experiences a horrific body decay as he ages and is finally eaten alive by a worm. A sequence intended for the beginning where Ren wins a bar fight – which was meant to show Ren's strength and vitality – was removed from storyboards by the network, which felt that the subject of drinking was deemed inappropriate for its target audience.

The network executives disliked the drawings by Lynne Naylor and those influenced by her that featured curvaceous women as "the exploitation of women". In response, the animators who drew "Ren's Retirement" gave Ren a coffin that vaguely resembles the body of a shapely woman. Voice actor Billy West recalled the animators that drew the funeral sequence with goers dressed up "as window dressing; instead of women, they put chippendales wherever they could, The full monty except for a little thong. And they [the executives] were satisfied, 'Look, that's Ok'. But then they realized after it was made, when it was on TV: "AHHHHHHHH!!! What have we done?". This is also the first episode since "The Big Shot!" to involve Lynne Naylor, as she had left Spümcø during production, returning to the series in this episode as a background artist. Her only directorial effort on the series was the "You Are What You Eat!" segment aired during this episode.

== Reception ==
American journalist Thad Komorowski gave the episode three-and-a-half out of five stars. He noted that Bill Wray's macabre style gave the episode its brilliant moments, but it suffered by trying to be as repellent and shocking as what series creator John Kricfalusi would have done.

== Books ==
- Dobbs, G. Michael (2015). Escape – How Animation Broke into the Mainstream in the 1990s. Orlando: BearManor Media. ISBN 978-1593931100.
- Komorowski, Thad (2017). Sick Little Monkeys: The Unauthorized Ren & Stimpy Story. Albany, Georgia: BearManor Media. ISBN 978-1629331836.
