= Gilbert (film) =

- Film poster
- Directed by: Neil Berkeley
- Written by: Neil Berkeley; James Leche
- Produced by: Maggie Contreras; David Heiman; James Leche
- Starring: Gilbert Gottfried
- Cinematography: Neil Berkeley
- Edited by: James Leche
- Production company: Future You Pictures
- Distributed by: Gravitas Ventures
- Release dates: April 20, 2017 (Tribeca); November 3, 2017 (New York City)
- Running time: 94 minutes
- Country: United States
- Language: English
- Box office: $8,362

Gilbert is a 2017 American documentary film about the life and career of comedian Gilbert Gottfried. It opened in theaters on November 3, 2017.

== Synopsis ==
The film depicts Gottfried's everyday life with his wife and two children. The film also depicts Gottfried's interactions (on occasion in his real voice) with his two sisters and his relationship with his parents. The film also discusses The Aristocrats joke told at the Hugh Hefner roast that occurred right after the September 11 attacks. Gottfried had just made a joke about a flight to California that had to make a stop at the Empire State Building. The film also discusses the controversy surrounding tweets Gottfried made after the earthquake disaster in Japan that led to his firing as the voice of the Aflac duck.

== Cast ==
All appearing as themselves

- Gilbert Gottfried
- Arlene Gottfried
- Karen Gottfried
- Dave Attell
- Joy Behar
- Richard Belzer
- Lewis Black
- Bill Burr
- Dick Van Dyke
- Susie Essman
- Jim Gaffigan
- Judy Gold
- Whoopi Goldberg
- Arsenio Hall
- Anthony Jeselnik
- Penn Jillette
- Richard Kind
- Artie Lange
- Jay Leno
- Howie Mandel
- Joe Piscopo
- Paul Provenza
- Jeffrey Ross
- Bob Saget
- Alan Zweibel

== Release ==
Gilbert premiered at the Tribeca Film Festival on April 20, 2017. The film was also shown at the 2017 Hot Docs Film Festival and the 2017 deadCENTER Film Festival The film was acquired by Gravitas Ventures and was released in New York City on November 3, 2017 and in Los Angeles on November 10, 2017. Gilbert was released on iTunes on November 14, 2017.

== Reception ==
=== Critical response ===
The film earned high critical praise. On the review aggregator website Rotten Tomatoes, Gilbert has an approval rating of 95%, based on reviews from 22 critics. The website's consensus reads, "Gilbert pays tribute to a veteran comedian whose famously grating act belies his thoughtful personality -- and anchors a surprisingly insightful film."

=== Awards ===
Gilbert won the Special Jury Prize for Best Documentary at the 2017 deadCENTER Film Festival.
