= Jimminy Lummox =

- The Ren & Stimpy Show episode
- Episode no.: Season 3 Episode 7
- Directed by: Ron Hughart
- Story by: Bob Camp; Jim Gomez; Ron Hauge
- Production code: RS-310
- Original air date: February 19, 1994

Guest appearance
- Stan Freberg as Jimminy Lummox

Episode chronology
← Previous "Stimpy's Cartoon Show"	Next → "Bass Masters"

"Jimminy Lummox" is the seventh episode of the third season of The Ren & Stimpy Show. It originally aired on Nickelodeon in the United States on February 19, 1994.

== Plot ==
Ren Höek owns a company named Ren Höek Inc. where he spends his days causing sadistic mayhem. He poses as a company made to handle prank calls before pranking an unsuspecting victim; he also pranks a beheaded chicken living in a refrigerator, who reacts aggressively after Ren pretends to be Colonel Sanders intending to fry him. Ren goes to the local reservoir, where he force-feeds beavers lemon juice and releases them into the water. The beavers urinate and subsequently contaminate the water for the entire population; an unsuspecting Mr. Pipe drinks the water from the tap.

Ren goes to a tree where he traumatizes fledglings by screaming at them. He returns home, where he attempts to prank Stimpy by making him sit on a push-pin and nitroglycerin; Stimpy is not harmed and affected by the resulting explosion, still focusing on the television. Ren pours live crabs into the bathtub while Stimpy is bathing; to his disappointment, Stimpy does not feel any pain, despite the crabs grabbing on his body; he mistakes them for body fat.

Stimpy finally realizes Ren's problem when he finds Ren pulling the wing of Ralph the fly for his sadistic amusement; he assigns his conscience, Jimminy Lummox, to him for a while. Jimminy immediately appears and sits on Ren while singing about his duties. He immediately smashes an angry Ren, flattening him afterwards.

Ren wakes up to find his dentures gone; Stimpy had been using them to remove fish scales. Ren is pulverized again when he reacts angrily. He is angered even further, when his collection of stolen used underwear from celebrities including Van Johnson and June Allyson are washed. He goes insane, believing Stimpy is trying to get him assaulted while angry. Jimminy Lummox appears again, flattening him with a car while Stimpy flees. Ren asks if Jimminy has a conscience; he reveals his conscience, Tinker Galoot (Kowalski in a fairy costume), who pulverizes him the same way Jimminy did to Ren each time he offends someone.

== Cast ==
- Billy West as Ren, Stimpy, and Mr. Pipe
- Stan Freberg as Jimminy Lummox
- Harris Peet as Chicken

== Production ==
Bob Camp wrote the story for the episode at Spümcø, but it was never approved for the second season by series creator John Kricfalusi up until his firing. Ron Hughart, an individual regarded to be reliable by both Kricfalusi and Nickelodeon executives, served as director, while Jim Gomez and Ron Hauge rewrote the script. Peter Avanzino storyboarded the episode. Such scenes as Ren tormenting Stimpy and Ren tricking Mr. Pipe into drinking beaver urine were censored by the network during its original airing.

== Reception ==
American journalist Thad Komorowski gave "Jimminy Lummox" three out of five stars, writing that the episode was "a one-joke cartoon made funnier by Freberg's voice work".

== Books and articles ==
- Dobbs, G. Michael (2015). Escape – How Animation Broke into the Mainstream in the 1990s. Orlando: BearManor Media. ISBN 978-1593931100.
- Komorowski, Thad (2017). Sick Little Monkeys: The Unauthorized Ren & Stimpy Story. Albany, Georgia: BearManor Media. ISBN 978-1629331836.
