= Jerry the Bellybutton Elf =

- The Ren & Stimpy Show episode
- Episode no.: Season 3 Episode 11
- Directed by: Ron Hughart
- Written by: Steve Mellor
- Production code: RS-311
- Original air date: April 9, 1994

Guest appearance
- Gilbert Gottfried as Jerry the Bellybutton Elf

Episode chronology
← Previous "Ren's Retirement"	Next → "Hard Times for Haggis"

"Jerry the Bellybutton Elf" is the twelfth episode of the third season of The Ren & Stimpy Show. It originally aired on Nickelodeon in the United States on April 9, 1994.

== Plot ==
Stimpy plays with his navel while Ren is reading a newspaper. Stimpy pokes grotesquely and injects hazardous substances into it for his own amusement. At night he is sharpening pencils into his belly button; this also sharpens the finger of an angered Ren. Stimpy is suddenly goaded by his belly button to crawl inside it; he obliges, nonsensically able to enter, with his body imploding into a literal button. Stimpy experiences a psychedelic journey inside his body. Stimpy lands in a desolate region, where he finds Jerry the Bellybutton Elf. Jerry invites him to "play" (actually to help him with his housework), but not before giving him a lint miniskirt.

Ren wakes up the next morning, only to find the imploded button; believing him to be dead, he mourns Stimpy and bites on the button, until he hears voices inside it. Stimpy is being congratulated by Jerry, only to be chased after serving Jerry lint loaf, whom he despises. Mr. Horse, the Ghost, Powdered Toast Man and Kowalski join in, with Muddy Mudskipper and his new wife (used to be Abner's) appearing. Jerry chases Stimpy with a car, only for Stimpy to make it worse by offering to microwave the loaf. Jerry rips apart his skin, revealing himself to be a demonic pork chop-like being named Adonis, Lord of Chaos. The commotion at Ren's house soon turns into a full on party, with Ren agreeing to serve drinks. Stimpy gets out of the belly button to seek help, only for Adonis to pull the duo inside and devour them. Everyone leaves and Mudskipper's wife eats the button, presumably killing Adonis.

== Cast ==
- Billy West as Ren, Stimpy, Kowalski, and That Guy (The Salesman)
- Gilbert Gottfried as Jerry the Bellybutton Elf
- Harris Peet as Muddy Mudskipper

== Production ==
Steve Mellor wrote the episode; this is the first episode to not be written by a Spümcø alumnus as well as the last episode he worked on. The task of directing "Jerry the Bellybutton Elf" was assigned to Ron Hughart, an individual considered to be reliable by both John Kricfalusi and Nickelodeon executives. The story was intended as a parody of Alice in Wonderland. Hughart said of his work on "Jerry": "['Climb Inside My World'] was added to the episode at some point after the initial storyboard was given to me. A couple of the guys didn't want to board the sequence or at least didn't know what to do with it. I boarded it and timed it."

== Reception ==
American journalist Thad Komorowski rated the episode zero out of five stars, calling it a "pitifully unfunny" episode and one of the worst episodes in the series. However, he considered the psychedelic scene to be stellar. By contrast, the critic Witney Seibold praised the climax and Gottfried's voice acting, writing: "Jerry has one of the most vocal and unusual freakouts in a show full of them. Gottfried didn't just employ his well-known voice, but pushed it to 11, shrieking at the top of his lungs and mutating into a giant murderous porkchop. What a class act".

== Books ==
- Dobbs, G. Michael (2015). Escape – How Animation Broke into the Mainstream in the 1990s. Orlando: BearManor Media. ISBN 978-1593931100.
- Komorowski, Thad (2017). Sick Little Monkeys: The Unauthorized Ren & Stimpy Story. Albany, Georgia: BearManor Media. ISBN 978-1629331836.
