= Hard Times for Haggis =

- The Ren & Stimpy Show episode
- Episode no.: Season 3 Episode 13
- Directed by: Chris Reccardi
- Story by: Jim Gomez; Chris Reccardi
- Production code: RS-308
- Original air date: April 30, 1994

Guest appearance
- Alan Young as Haggis MacHaggis

Episode chronology
← Previous "Jerry the Bellybutton Elf"	Next → "Eat My Cookies"

"Hard Times for Haggis" is the thirteenth episode of the third season of The Ren & Stimpy Show. It originally aired on Nickelodeon in the United States on April 30, 1994.

== Plot ==
Haggis MacHaggis is a narcissistic, bad-tempered Scotsman who stars in a TV show, The Scotsman Show, that consists of him beating his dog, Whacky, with his shillelagh. Despite the manifest lack of humor, Haggis thinks beating up Whacky is the height of hilarity. He lives in a recreation of a Gothic Scottish castle somewhere in California, spending his days rewatching his own episodes. While berating his butler for preferring Rocky & Bullwinkle, he hears that ratings on The Scotsman Show has plummeted due to the greater popularity of The Ren & Stimpy Show, and finally Haggis's show is cancelled. Haggis becomes angry and jealous, and goes to destroy the television with his shillelagh. He discovers that Ren and Stimpy have taken over his castle and that his former agent, the Salesman, has abandoned him in favor of Ren and Stimpy. Haggis swears revenge.

Haggis tries to unite his fans, but finds that he had none; everyone is watching Ren & Stimpy on the television. He tries to block the view at a television store display and is kicked out. He is even more livid when he spots a Ren & Stimpy film in 3D being screened and Gritty Kitty litter being sold. Haggis attacks a Ren and Stimpy fan, and in turn is beaten by the fan's father, the Fire Chief, for resembling a "circus midget".

Haggis is reduced to living in a park, pretending to be a pigeon being fed breadcrumbs by an old woman. He is threatened by gangster pigeons to hand out the remains of his meal, in a reference to the pilot, and is immediately beat up by the pigeons and the old woman. Meanwhile, Ren and Stimpy have a peaceful life in the castle. Stimpy has fun with a sword, unintentionally slicing the clothes of the butler, while Ren sits aside and reads a censored book by Geoffrey Chaucer. At dinner, Stimpy passes the salt to Ren while walking on food. The lid falls off and all the salt falls on the chicken, which enrages Ren.

Haggis discovers a doll of himself being discounted from $29.99 to $5,25¢ and eventually free. A cloaked individual acquires the doll and takes it to an alley. Haggis discovers him to be Whacky, whom he had missed, but Whacky had gone insane from his owner's abuse and destroys the doll as retribution. Haggis escapes to avoid being recognized, but is nearly run over by Muddy Mudskipper. He goes to a nearby bridge to commit suicide, but is dissuaded after an ad for a service named Rent-A-Thug is blown to his face. He is overjoyed by this opportunity of revenge. He acquires two thugs for the price of one.

The trio get to Big Time Studios, where Ren and Stimpy are present for a show. After Stimpy signs an autograph with hairballs, the duo receive makeup, only for the thugs to assault them. Haggis holds the crew hostage as he instantly produces The Ben & Stumpy Show, a low-effort rip-off of the original series with sock puppets. Despite this, they manage to capture the charm of the show, with the crowd going wild over the showing and the thugs getting the contract instead. The trio are kicked out by the manager. The episode ends with a homeless Ren and Stimpy eating glass, unmoved by the episode's events, while Haggis laments his failure.

== Cast ==
- Billy West as Ren, Stimpy, Salesman (That Guy), the pigeon, a fan, and the old lady
- Alan Young as Haggis MacHaggis
- Stan Freberg as Haggis' butler
- Harris Peet as Muddy Mudskipper and the Fire Chief

== Production ==
The story that became "Hard Times for Haggis" was conceived of in May 1993 by Chris Reccardi, who initially titled it "The Scotsman"; the episode was one of the few episodes Reccardi had worked on after Spümcø was fired. The title was only changed shortly before the cartoon was aired as it was felt the title might be taken as anti-Scottish. The character of Haggis is very similar to George Liquor, who could not be used anymore on The Ren & Stimpy Show as copyright owner Viacom International had sold the rights of the character to John Kricfalusi. Much like George Liquor, Haggis is an immensely arrogant, crass man who sees violence as the preferred means to solve problems, and has a total inability to understand the viewpoint of others. Unlike George Liquor, Haggis falls into depression and self-pity when confronted by set-backs and failures. As a part of an effort to improve ratings in light of the immense controversy that the firing of Kricfalusi had caused in 1992, the new showrunner, Bob Camp, recruited in 1993 as a recurring guest star the veteran British character actor Alan Young to provide the voice of Haggis.

Reccardi intended the episode to be a metaphor for the animation industry, with the inane TV show starring Haggis being an analogy for the cartoon industry before The Ren & Stimpy Show premiered in 1991 as the metareferential Ren & Stimpy Show is depicted as being much superior to Haggis's show. Reccardi had wanted to do more dramatic tales inspired by the likes of Star Trek and the works of James Stewart, saying: "I've always been attracted to psychodramas, like William Shatner in 'The Enemy Within' and Jimmy Stewart flipping out in It's a Wonderful Life. But those scenes in 'Hard Times for Haggis' were the logical result of character arcs. I hate that word, but it's required jargon in the entertainment world". The way that the asinine puppet version of The Ren & Stimpy Show replaces the genuine article in the episode was likewise intended as a metaphor for how the quality of television shows decline over time. Reccardi made the main focus on Haggis in the episode to explore his psychology, most notably his hubris followed by his rage and self-destructive, suicidal tendencies following the cancellation of his television show, making Haggis a more complex cartoon villain than those normally depicted.

== Reception ==
American critic Thad Komorowski gave the episode four-and-a-half out of five stars. He praised the episode as one of the best episodes in the series, as Reccardi had "a gift for delving into the drama intrinsic to the diseased mind", praising "several stirring sequences reminiscent of the better staged and acted set pieces in the Spümcø cartoons". Komorowski singled out for praise the scenes of Haggis's depression and his contemplation of suicide as "remarkably unsettling in their execution". However, Komorowski stated that Reccardi's attempts at comedy in "Hard Times for Haggis" misfired as he wrote that Reccardi's jokes tended to follow flat.

== Books ==
- Dobbs, G. Michael (2015). Escape – How Animation Broke into the Mainstream in the 1990s. Orlando: BearManor Media. ISBN 978-1593931100.
- Komorowski, Thad (2017). Sick Little Monkeys: The Unauthorized Ren & Stimpy Story. Albany, Georgia: BearManor Media. ISBN 978-1629331836.
