= Road Apples (The Ren & Stimpy Show) =

- The Ren & Stimpy Show episode
- Episode no.: Season 3 Episode 9
- Directed by: Howard E. Baker
- Written by: Ron Hauge
- Production code: RS-319
- Original air date: March 12, 1994

Guest appearance
- Jack Carter as Wilbur Cobb

Episode chronology
← Previous "Bass Masters"	Next → "Ren's Retirement"

"Road Apples" is the ninth episode of the third season of The Ren & Stimpy Show. It originally aired on Nickelodeon in the United States on March 12, 1994. The episode was widely considered to be one of the worst episodes of the series.

== Plot ==
Ren and Stimpy are hitchhiking in the desert, having done so for months. Ren collapses and Stimpy tries to carry him; he too cannot stand this arduous ordeal. They both collapse, but Stimpy's tongue guides him to a road. Ren is overjoyed, having realized that they can be saved in case people pick them up, as Stimpy spots a RV. Ren's body had been eaten up by a nearby vulture, which gives them the idea to resemble roadkill; Ren is simply run over to achieve this. The Pipes, owners of the RV, are frustrated to see the duo are still alive, so they take the duo in.

Mr. Pipe offers to clean the duo; Stimpy is offered blood-sucking sand snails for his sunburn, while Ren is scalded by the hot water at the shower; Mr. Pipe joins in, apparently enjoying the scalding heat. He later leads the duo around the residence, where aside from standard appliances, there is also a butcher shop headed by Wilbur Cobb among oddities; his pipe is broken by an arrow from the shooting range nearby.

Mr. Pipe offers lunch to the duo, much to their excitement. They are attracted by the carnivore diet offered by Mrs. Pipe, but Mr. Pipe insists that they cannot eat solid food, instead giving them skunk milk. Stimpy likes the drink; despite its foul odor which deters Ren, he apparently also liked the taste. Mr. Pipe forces them to go outside to "walk", but due to the RV never stopping they hang behind it.

At night, the duo listen to ghost stories from the couple while drinking hot skunk milk. Ren goes to bed early, with Stimpy reluctantly following despite wanting to hear the end of the story; they are forced to sleep with Wilbur Cobb. They finally are able to sleep after Wilbur rambles for hours. Ren wakes up in the middle of the night to find everyone sleeping, panicking when he finds no one at the wheel; the RV sinks down a lake. Ren and Stimpy are kicked out for "wetting the bed"; Wilbur reveals himself to have done so, also being kicked out, ending the episode.

== Cast ==
- Billy West as Ren, Stimpy and Mr. Pipe
- Cheryl Chase as Mrs. Pipe
- Jack Carter as Wilbur Cobb

== Production ==
Howard Baker, who directed "Road Apples", joined the newly founded Games Animation studio in October 1992. Baker was one of the few Games artists who was not an alumnus of Spümcø. Baker and Stephen DeStefano did storyboards for the episode, with Garrett Ho contributing without being credited; his credit was restored in later airings. He was treated as an outsider except by the showrunner, Bob Camp. Baker was promoted to a director by Camp in 1993. Baker recalled that directing "Road Apples" was a difficult experience, saying: "I wished there was more help from the crew, who didn't want to help me for some reason. Despite the wonderful, talented artists, Games was a strange place with a lot of odd ego trips going on. I was hoping to have a longer relationship with the show, but the angst after it left Spümcø was too caustic for me". Camp felt sorry for Jack Carter, a once-prominent comedian of the 1960s who had fallen on hard times, and tried to write in the Wilbur Cobb character as often as possible to give Carter work. Camp had insisted on adding Cobb to the script of "Road Apples", which other Games artists felt to be shoehorning him in, and took the story on an "inexplicable tangent".

== Reception ==
American journalist Thad Komorowski rated the episode zero out of five stars, calling it one of the worst episodes of the show and represented everything wrong with the last three seasons of the series.

== Books and articles ==
- Dobbs, G. Michael (2015). Escape – How Animation Broke into the Mainstream in the 1990s. Orlando: BearManor Media. ISBN 978-1593931100.
- Komorowski, Thad (2017). Sick Little Monkeys: The Unauthorized Ren & Stimpy Story. Albany, Georgia: BearManor Media. ISBN 978-1629331836.
