= Frank Santopadre =

American comedy writer and producer

- Occupations: Comedy writer, producer, podcast co-host
- Awards: Daytime Emmy Award

Frank Santopadre is an American Emmy-winning comedy writer and producer for television, radio, and live events, currently working as a staff writer on ABC's The View. From 2014 until 2022, he served as the co-producer and co-host of Gilbert Gottfried's Amazing Colossal Podcast.

== Career ==
Santopadre has provided comedy material for TV series and specials for over 30 years, including The 15th Annual Kennedy Center Mark Twain American Prize for Humor, Ellen DeGeneres, Lewis Black & Friends: Let Freedom Laugh, The Joy Behar Show, and The Comedy Central Roast of Pamela Anderson and Roseanne Barr. He received a Daytime Emmy Award for Outstanding Informative Talk Show as a producer of The View having also been nominated three times prior.

From 2014 to 2022, Santopadre was the co-producer and co-host of the weekly podcast Gilbert Gottfried's Amazing Colossal Podcast, as well as an offshoot Gilbert & Frank's Amazing Colossal Obsessions. The show, co-hosted by Gilbert Gottfried, featured hour-long interviews with show business icons, including Alan Arkin, Dick Van Dyke, Bruce Dern, and Carl Reiner. It was also named Best Podcast of 2015 by the Village Voice.

In 2025, Santopadre started a new podcast titled Fun for All Ages.
