= Eat My Cookies =

- The Ren & Stimpy Show episode
- Episode no.: Season 3 Episode 14
- Directed by: Ron Hughart
- Written by: Ron Hauge
- Story by: Richard Pursel (uncredited)
- Production code: RS-317
- Original air date: June 4, 1994

Guest appearance
- Rosie O'Donnell as Girl Scout Leader

Episode chronology
← Previous "Hard Times for Haggis"	Next → "Ren's Bitter Half"

"Eat My Cookies" is the fourteenth episode from the third season of The Ren & Stimpy Show. It originally aired on Nickelodeon in the United States on June 4, 1994.

== Plot ==
Ren and Stimpy get into camp; they had signed up for the Girl Scouts despite being male. The Leader forces them to earn badges by doing menial tasks typical of Girl Scouts. They are first assigned to sell Girl Scout Cookies.

The duo sell the cookies in the desert. They wait for a long time, as no one appears to buy the cookies; a starving Ren and Stimpy eat the cookies, despite Stimpy's objections. Later, a limousine appears, with the driver demanding a box; the duo replace the cookies with cactuses in an impromptu solution. It surprisingly succeeds, as the driver likes the cactuses and pays the duo far more than the cookies are worth. Ren loses all the money while playing poker with the girls.

Ren complains about losing the money, so Stimpy tries to motivate him with by switching their objective to earning merit badges. The Leader goads them to take on the Snipe Hunting Badge challenge. Ren believes that Snipes don't exist so he does not come along. The next day, he wakes up to find Stimpy to have caught a Snipe; it in fact exists, being a spider-like monstrosity who immediately swallows Ren and tortures him before releasing him. Stimpy receives the badge joyfully while Ren feels left out and sad. The Leader emerges from a rock and gives him a guide to earn easy merit badges.

Ren and Stimpy try to do the easiest ones, which involve simply standing on a spot and taking a step; it is revealed to be a cliff obscured by the tall grass, where the duo fall and earn the "Flying" badge. They fall on jagged rocks, which earn them yet another badge. They engage in more "easy" badges. One, drowning, is unable to be succeeded as it involves dying. They fail to collect badger eggs either. For the "Bravery in the Face of Certain Doom" badge, Ren sneaks into a food storage unit, only to be assaulted by bears; he had been in the Elk Bear Lodge the whole time.

The duo sit at the campfire, where the Girl Scouts reveal themselves to be old men in disguise; Stimpy reveals himself to be also an old man, while Ren is revealed to be a skeleton with innards; they laugh at the sheer absurdity of their situations.

== Cast ==
- Billy West as Ren, Stimpy, badger, old men
- Rosie O'Donnell as Girl Scout Leader
- Cheryl Chase as the girl scouts

== Production ==
Richard Pursel wrote the premise at Spümcø for the second season, which was never approved by John Kricfalusi until after his firing; Games Animation would produce it as part of the third season. According to Pursel, the Girl Scout Leader replaced what was to be George Liquor in a Boy Scouts uniform. Ron Hughart, who would go on to direct episodes of Futurama and be supervising director for American Dad!, was considered to be reliable by both Kricfalusi and Nickelodeon executives, but showed little interest in improving the story of the episode, even after Kricfalusi's termination from the network. Regardless, he was assigned to direct the episode. Future DreamWorks Animation animator Vicky Jenson worked on the episode's storyboards. Rosie O'Donnell was contracted to be the episode's celebrity guest, in Games' bid to improve the series' reputation after the fallout of 1992.

== Reception ==
American critic Thad Komorowski gave the episode two out of five stars, calling it a "barren spot-gag" episode. Komorowski blamed the poor quality of "Eat My Cookies" on Hughart, who "lacked the comic sensibility and directorial individuality that Ren & Stimpy cartoons demanded".

== Books ==
- Dobbs, G. Michael (2015). Escape – How Animation Broke into the Mainstream in the 1990s. Orlando: BearManor Media. ISBN 978-1593931100.
- Komorowski, Thad (2017). Sick Little Monkeys: The Unauthorized Ren & Stimpy Story. Albany, Georgia: BearManor Media. ISBN 978-1629331836.
