= Bass Masters (The Ren & Stimpy Show) =

- The Ren & Stimpy Show episode
- Episode no.: Season 3 Episode 8
- Directed by: Bob Camp
- Written by: Bob Camp; Jim Gomez
- Story by: Richard Pursel (uncredited)
- Production code: RS-320
- Original air date: February 19, 1994

Guest appearance
- Jack Carter as Wilbur Cobb

Episode chronology
← Previous "Jimminy Lummox"	Next → "Road Apples"

"Bass Masters" is the eighth episode of the third season of The Ren & Stimpy Show. It originally aired on Nickelodeon in the United States on February 19, 1994.

== Plot ==
Ren and Stimpy are the hosts of a reality television series, Bassmasters. The duo had caught and killed a gargantuan amount of fish in their lifetime, including Muddy Mudskipper. Ren decides to catch the Foul-Mouthed Bass for this episode, tying a live fly to the hook as bait. He departs to the boat with his assistant Stimpy, who forces earthworms to walk for him. He stores equipment, including a harpoon sniper rifle whom he cherishes, a solar-powered bomb, a radar and his pet bear. Stimpy forces the earthworms to carry his gear, which Ren chastises for slowing down the pace of the episode.

Wilbur Cobb escapes from a nearby penitentiary, where he spots Ren and Stimpy's boat to be a potential getaway solution. Ren, being oblivious to Wilbur's criminal status, allows Wilbur to participate in the episode. The trio fish at a spot in the ocean for a whole day to no avail. Ren attributes this to Stimpy and Wilbur scaring the fish away.

The next day, Ren makes special chum to attract fish; two fish notice and begin to eat the chum frantically. Meanwhile, Wilbur and Stimpy relax in the sidelines. Wilbur massages Stimpy while Stimpy eats Kracky-Jacks; he finds a fish whistle prize, which he likes and uses it to summon a fish. The fish is pummeled by Wilbur, accidentally making him regaining sentience. The fish join the trio in eating Kracky-Jacks and relaxing, much to Ren's annoyance. The two fish devour all of Ren's chum; the three fish seem to have the ability to breathe above water.

Ren prepares his sniper rifle, with decoys nearby to attract fish; a travelling salesman fish appears but is not fooled by the decoys. He sells Ren a fish whistle, who immediately destroys his pants. He asks Stimpy, who catches a fish in his pants with the same whistle, his secret of catching fish; Stimpy reveals he can talk the fish's language, resulting in him summoning all the fish onto the boat to party. Ren is jealous of his skills, trying to abduct all of the fish, only to be met by Albert the Foul-Mouthed Bass. Albert, depressed from the numerous attempts by fishermen to catch him, convinces Ren to act like a fish to atone for his crimes; he is promptly caught as if he is a fish, and hanged in Albert's residence, where an elderly Albert tells his grandson how he caught this "dumb bass".

== Cast ==
- Billy West as Ren, Stimpy, and various fishes
- Jack Carter as Wilbur Cobb
- Bob Camp as the fish
- Harris Peet as Muddy Mudskipper and Albert the Foulmouthed Bass

== Production ==
The premise was written in 1992 at Spümcø by Richard Pursel, which was never approved by series creator John Kricfalusi. George Liquor as one of the characters featured in the original storyline. After Kricfalusi's firing, Games Animation produced the episode in the third season. Due to Pursel's refusal to join Games Animation, showrunner Bob Camp took over direction of the episode and rewrote the story with Jim Gomez, by changing the story altogether, and even replacing George Liquor (of which Kricfalusi obtained the rights to) to Wilbur Cobb, whom he appeared in one of the previous episodes "Stimpy's Cartoon Show". Like his last appearance, he was provided to a living voice actor Jack Carter. Bill Wray noted that this kind act worked to the detriment of the show, as the character became progressively less likable after he was promoted from a one-time character based on his appearance in "Stimpy's Cartoon Show".

== Reception ==
American journalist Thad Komorowski gave the episode two out of five stars, considering the episode to be extremely unmemorable.

== Books and articles ==
- Dobbs, G. Michael (2015). Escape – How Animation Broke into the Mainstream in the 1990s. Orlando: BearManor Media. ISBN 978-1593931100.
- Komorowski, Thad (2017). Sick Little Monkeys: The Unauthorized Ren & Stimpy Story. Albany, Georgia: BearManor Media. ISBN 978-1629331836.
