= Gilbert Gottfried =

American comedian (1955–2022)

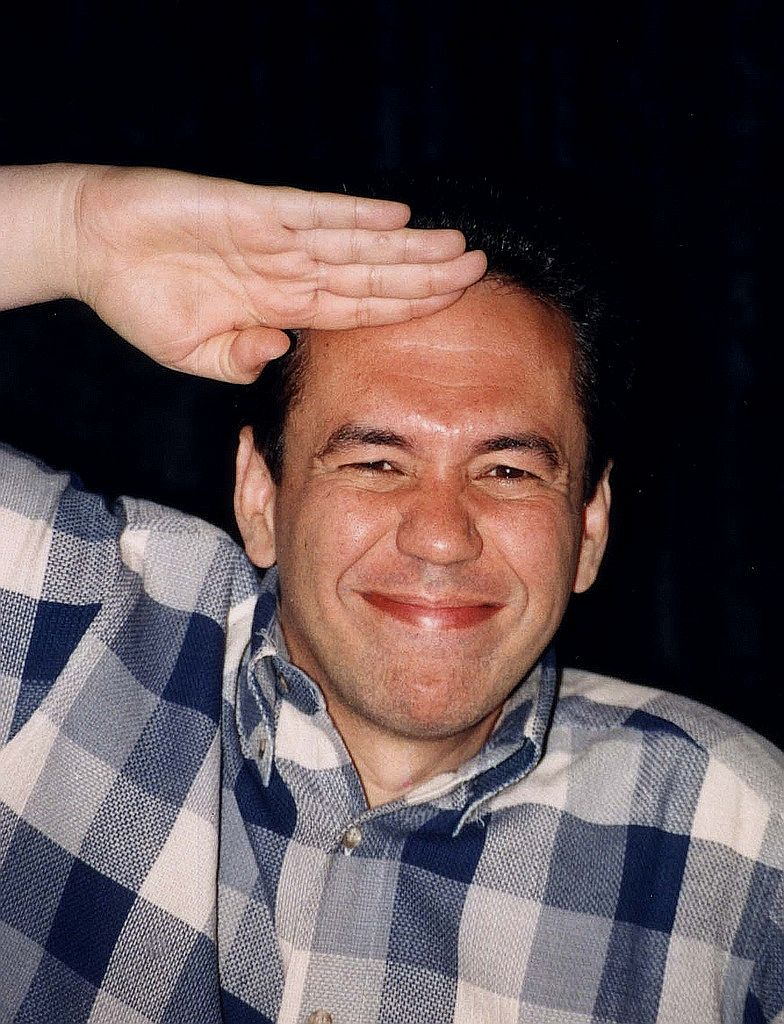
- Gottfried in 1999
- Born: Gilbert Jeremy Gottfried; February 28, 1955; New York City, U.S.
- Died: April 12, 2022 (aged 67); New York City, U.S.
- Resting place: Kensico Cemetery
- Occupations: Stand-up comedian; actor
- Spouse: Dara Kravitz (m. 2007)
- Children: 2
- Relatives: Arlene Gottfried (sister)

Comedy career
- Years active: 1970–2022
- Medium: Stand-up, film, television, podcast
- Genres: Satire; blue comedy; black comedy; insult comedy; improvisational comedy; impressions
- Subjects: Religion; race relations; racism; popular culture; sex; cinema; celebrities
- Website: gilbertgottfried.com

Gilbert Jeremy Gottfried (February 28, 1955 – April 12, 2022) was an American stand-up comedian and actor. He was best known for his exaggerated shrill voice, strong New York accent, his squint, and his edgy, often controversial sense of humor. His numerous roles in film and television included voicing Iago in the Walt Disney Company's Aladdin (1992), Mister Mxyzptlk in Superman: The Animated Series and Justice League Action, Digit LeBoid in PBS Kids' Cyberchase, and Kraang Subprime in Teenage Mutant Ninja Turtles. He also played Mr. Peabody in the Problem Child franchise, the only actor in the series to reprise his role in all three films as well as the animated television series.

Gilbert Gottfried also voiced the Aflac duck mascot, in its many television commercials, until 2011, when Daniel McKeague replaced him in the role as the quacking insurance company's duck mascot.

Gottfried hosted Gilbert Gottfried's Amazing Colossal Podcast (2014–2022), along with Frank Santopadre, which featured discussions of classic films and celebrity interviews, most often with veteran actors, comedians, musicians, and comedy writers. The documentary Gilbert (2017) explored his life and career.

== Early life ==
Gottfried was born in the Coney Island section of the Brooklyn borough of New York City on February 28, 1955, the son of hardware store owner Max Gottfried and homemaker Lillian Zimmerman. His father and grandfather ran the store, above which the family lived. He was raised in a non-practicing Jewish family, and said of his upbringing, "I ate pork. We weren't that aware of the holidays or anything like that, but were aware of being Jewish. It's like I kind of knew that even though I was never bar mitzvahed and we didn't follow the holidays, I knew that if the Nazis came back, I'd be in the same train coach with everyone else." He was the younger brother of Karen Gottfried and photographer Arlene Gottfried (1950–2017).

From Coney Island, the family moved to Brooklyn's Crown Heights, followed by Borough Park.

== Career ==
Gottfried's first comedy routine on stage was at the Bitter End in Greenwich Village during one of its Hootenanny Night events when he was 15 years old. His two sisters Arlene and Karen accompanied him, having thought the performances he did for the family were good enough for the stage and encouraged him to try it out. His early routines focused on impressions of old time actors and celebrities, including Boris Karloff and Humphrey Bogart. From there, he worked the local comedy circuit and became known in the area as a "comedian's comedian", and started to perform edgier material when he became bored with his usual routines. One such incident occurred when Gottfried opened for Belinda Carlisle, which was attended by younger girls and their mothers. Gottfried stated: "I tried doing my regular act for about 5 minutes, then I just launched into the filthiest stuff I could think of. And the next day, I got a call from my agent saying, 'Everybody there loved you,' which is show business talk for, 'You're fired.'"

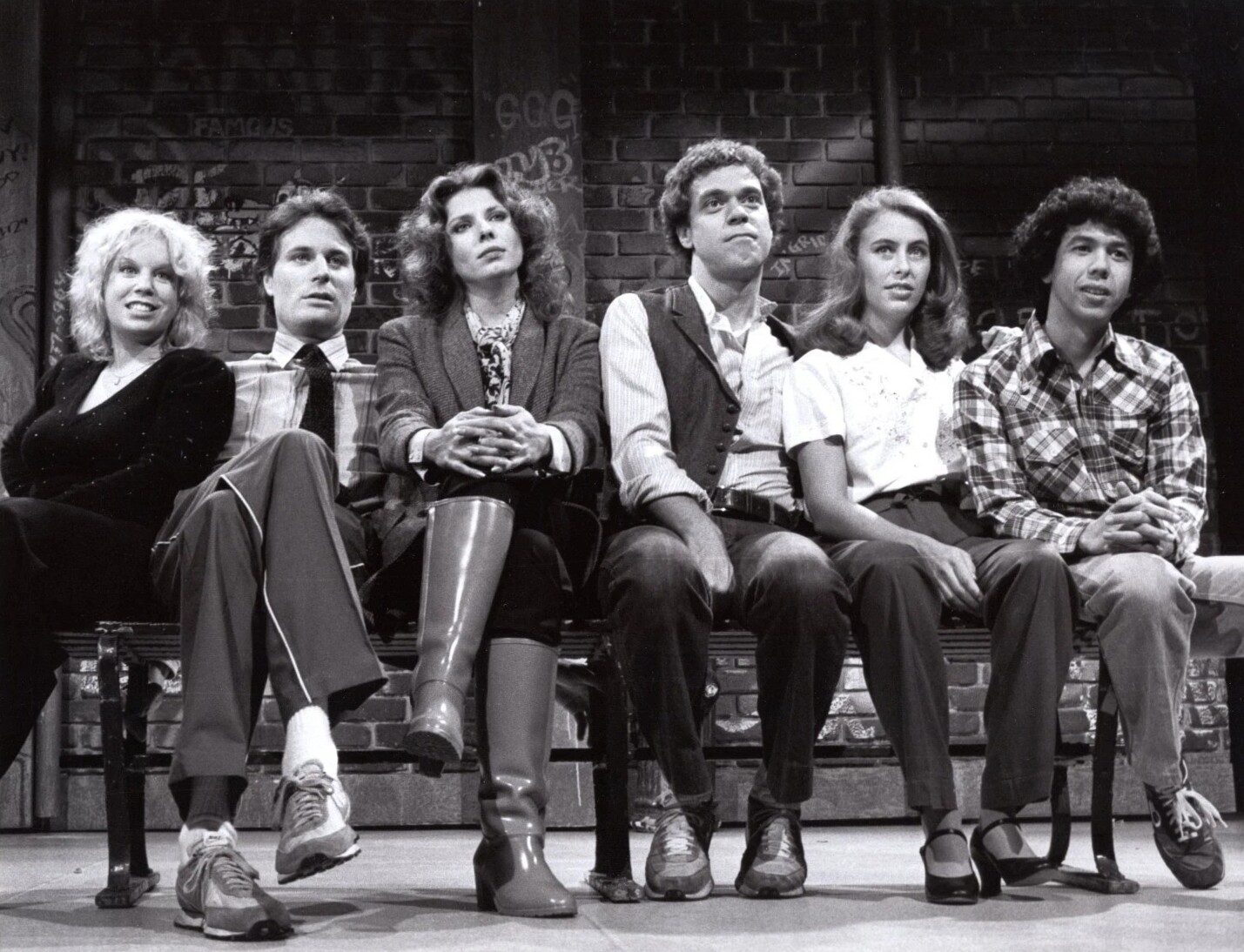
Gottfried (rightmost) on Saturday Night Live in 1980

In 1980, when Saturday Night Live was being retooled with a new staff and new comedians, the producers noticed Gottfried and hired him as a cast member for its sixth season. Gottfried's persona during Saturday Night Live sketches was different from his later characterization: He rarely spoke in his trademark voice and never squinted. During his 12-episode stint, he did not get along with the writers and was rarely used in sketches. He played one recurring character named Leo Waxman (husband of Denny Dillon's Pinky Waxman on the recurring talk show sketch "What's It All About?") and did two celebrity impersonations: David Stockman and Roman Polanski.

In April 1987, Gottfried headlined a half-hour comedy special that aired as part of the Cinemax Comedy Experiment series. Gottfried played Sidney Bernstein in Beverly Hills Cop II, in which he reunited with friend and fellow Saturday Night Live alumnus Eddie Murphy. In August that same year, Gottfried made his debut appearance on The Howard Stern Show. He went on to make over 100 appearances on the radio show over the next 25 years. That year, he also starred in the sitcom pilot Norman's Corner, co-written by Larry David prior to creating Seinfeld.

Although not a regular, Gottfried appeared in The Amazing Live Sea Monkeys, as well as performed the voice of Jerry the Belly Button Elf in Ren and Stimpy. Three of his most prominent roles came in 1990, 1991, and 1992, when he was cast as Igor Peabody in Problem Child and Problem Child 2 and Iago in Aladdin. When asked how he prepared for the role of Iago, Gottfried joked, "I did the whole DeNiro thing. I moved to South America! I lived in the trees!" Gottfried reprised the role in The Return of Jafar, Aladdin and the King of Thieves, the television series and various related media, such as Kingdom Hearts and House of Mouse. However, the character was ultimately recast to Alan Tudyk for the 2019 remake. Gottfried also voiced Berkeley Beetle in the 1994 film Thumbelina. He was the host of the Saturday edition of USA Up All Night for its entire run from 1989 to 1998.

He was a recurring guest star during the Tom Bergeron era of Hollywood Squares and became the center of attention in a bizarre episode that aired on October 1, 1999. In this episode, the two contestants made nine consecutive incorrect guesses, six of which were to be game-deciding questions asked to Gottfried. As the only remaining square, whoever captured him would have five squares and therefore win the game. Penn Jillette, who was a guest alongside Teller on the same episode, berated a contestant earlier for giving an incorrect guess by shouting, "You fool!". Gottfried himself began to use the phrase, with most of the other stars (even including Bergeron) eventually joining in with every successive wrong guess, beginning with the second question he was asked. As a result, it took the episode's entire half-hour to play only one game. The game only ended with the question "The word 'smog' comes from what two words?"; Gottfried correctly guessed "'smoke' and 'fog'", to Bergeron's joy. Appropriately, the episode became known as the "You Fool!" episode. Gottfried was temporarily fired from Hollywood Squares after this incident, returning about a month later.

Gottfried provided the voice of the duck in the Aflac commercials, Digit in Cyberchase, Dr. Bender and his son Wendell in The Fairly OddParents, and Mister Mxyzptlk (pronounced "Mikz-yez-pit-lik") in Superman: The Animated Series. He reprised his role as Mister Mxyzptlk in Lego Batman 3: Beyond Gotham, Justice League Action, and Lego DC Super-Villains. He also played a nasty wisecracking criminal genius named Nick Knack in two episodes of Superboy. He also co-wrote an issue of Superboy, which featured Nick Knack's origin. Gottfried made regular appearances on The Tonight Show with Jay Leno including where he played Harry Potter and Yoda.

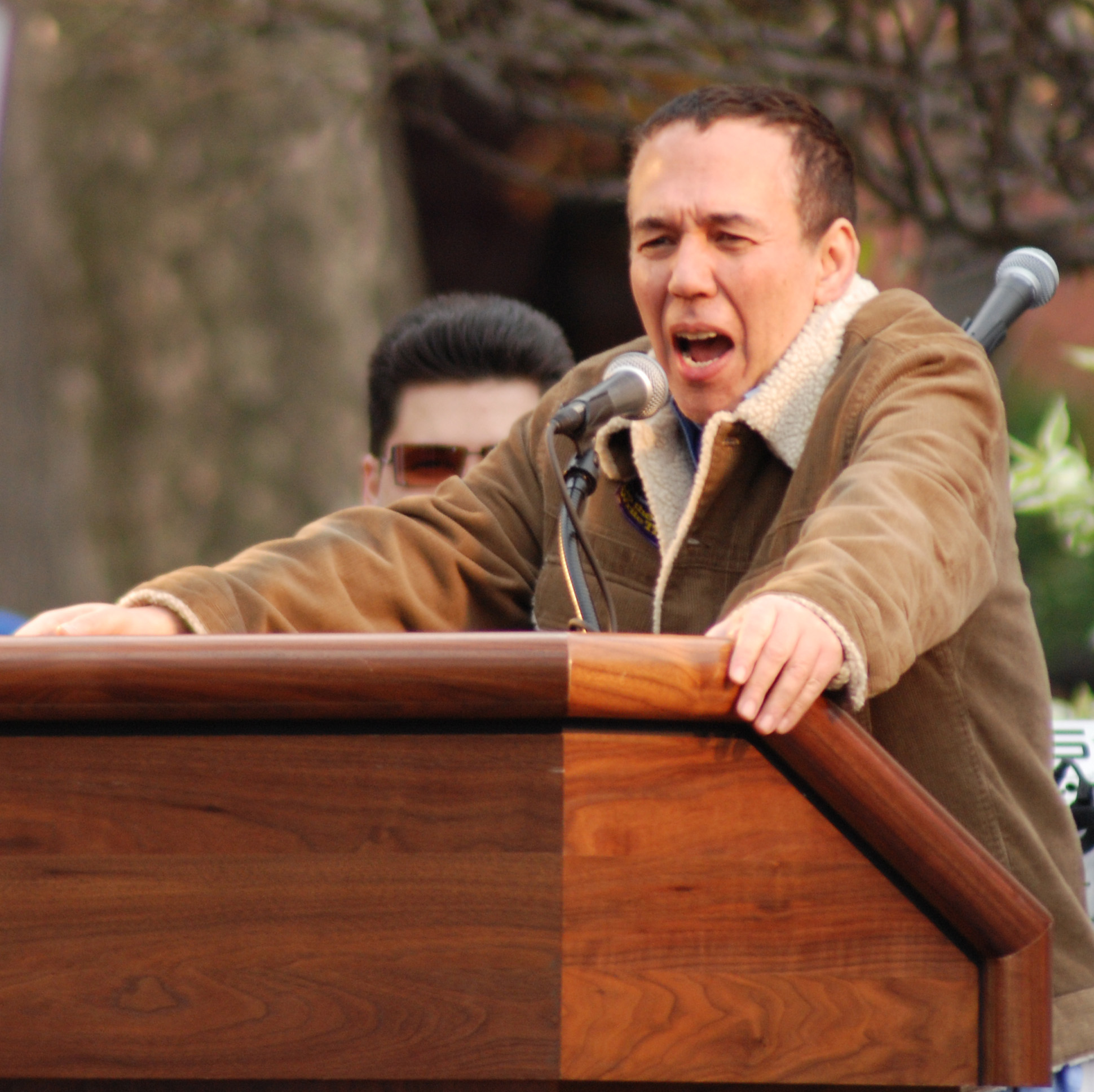
Gottfried at the Writers Guild of America East Solidarity Rally in November 2007

In 2004, Comedy Central featured Gottfried's stand-up material for Shorties Watchin' Shorties. Gottfried was part of an online advertising campaign for Microsoft's Office XP software, showing (in a series of animated cartoons) that the Clippy office assistant would be removed. In 2006, Gottfried topped the Boston Phoenix's tongue-in-cheek list of the world's 100 Unsexiest Men. In April, he performed with the University of Pennsylvania's Mask and Wig Club in their annual Intercollegiate Comedy Festival. Also in 2006, he made an appearance on the Let's Make a Deal portion of Gameshow Marathon (as a baby in a large high chair, he says "Hey Ricki, I think I need my diaper changed!"), and in the Dodge Viper in the big deal (where he tells the contestants "What were you thinking?!" because neither one picked it). He also guest-starred in The Grim Adventures of Billy & Mandy as Santa Claus in the one-hour Christmas special. He voiced Rick Platypus in an episode of My Gym Partner's a Monkey entitled "That Darn Platypus".

He appeared as Peter's horse in an episode of Family Guy entitled "Boys Do Cry", in which Peter is excited to learn that Gottfried is providing the voice of the horse. He also voiced himself in some episodes. He also guest-starred in Hannah Montana as Barny Bittmen. In January 2009, Gottfried worked again with David Faustino for an episode of Faustino's show Star-ving. In 2011, Gottfried appeared in the episode "Lost Traveller" on Law & Order: Special Victims Unit as Leo Gerber, a sarcastic computer professional working for the NYPD's Technical Assistance Response Unit, which producer Warren Leight said could become a recurring character. Gottfried read a section from the hit book Fifty Shades of Grey in a June 2012 YouTube video, which was created with the aim of using his trademark voice to make fun of the book's graphic sexual content.

In 2011, Gottfried published his only book Rubber Balls and Liquor.

In 2013, he became a member of "Team Rachael" in the second season of Food Network's Rachael vs. Guy: Celebrity Cook-Off. In March that year, he appeared on ABC's Celebrity Wife Swap, in which he swapped wives with Alan Thicke. He was also a commentator on TruTV's World's Dumbest....

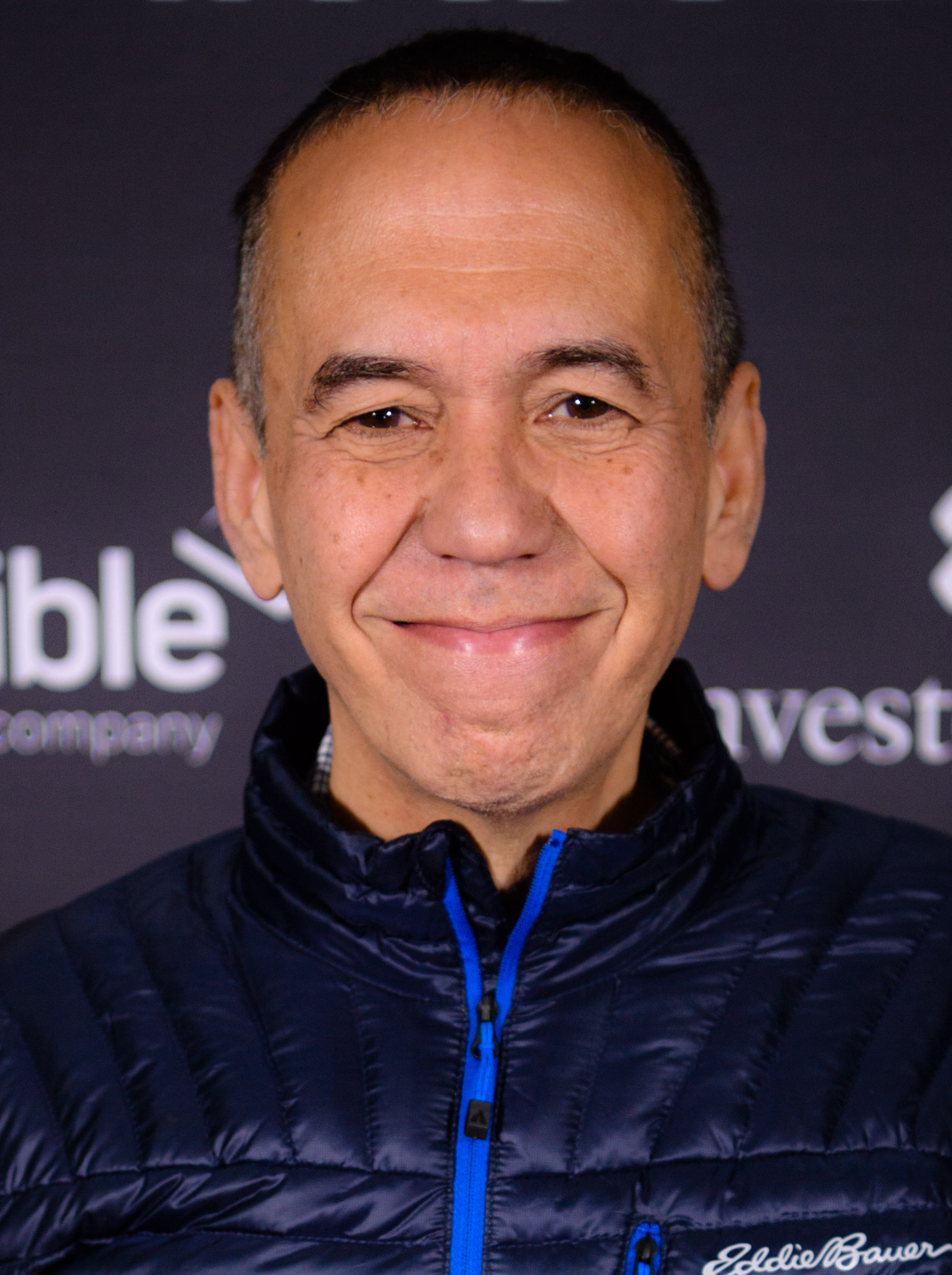
Gottfried in 2016

On May 28, 2014, Sideshow Network premiered Gilbert Gottfried's Amazing Colossal Podcast, an interview podcast where Gottfried and his co-host Frank Santopadre discussed classic films and talk to "Hollywood legends and behind-the-scenes talents" who shaped Gottfried's childhood and influenced his comedy. His first guest was Dick Cavett. His final guest was Brenda Vaccaro in a two part episode released on April 25 and May 2, 2022. Gottfried was hospitalized a few hours after the episode's recording.

Gottfried was the third contestant fired during the fourteenth season of the NBC reality show The Celebrity Apprentice. In 2016, he played the "Pig Man" in a comedy / fantasy film titled Abnormal Attraction.

In 2017, he appeared as himself in Episodes, where a contestant on a fictional TV endurance game show is penalized with "48 hours of Gilbert Gottfried".

On June 10, 2018, Gottfried appeared in a special segment of Last Week Tonight with John Oliver where, for UK viewers only, a segment about the UK's law restricting broadcast of debates from the Houses of Parliament was replaced by 5 minutes of him reading "3-star Yelp reviews" along with host John Oliver telling the audience "you brought this on yourself because of your stupid law." He returned on November 18, 2018, in the show's last episode of the year to read out extracts from the Brexit agreement, again for UK viewers only. He had previously performed as "the real voice of Jared Kushner" in dubbed film clips on the show.

On July 31, 2019, Gottfried appeared as a guest in episode 170 of the Angry Video Game Nerd.

On January 10, 2022, he guest-starred as God in the penultimate episode of Smiling Friends Season 1. On October 18, 2022, he appeared in the Somebody Feed Phil Season 6 episode "Croatia" in the "Joke for Max" segment on a video call with the show host Philip Rosenthal where he tells a few jokes in honor of Phil's late father Max. Released in the same month, The Paloni Show! Halloween Special includes a skit with Gottfried voicing an "apartment manager who doesn't want to deal with his tenants."

=== Podcast ===
Gilbert Gottfried's Amazing Colossal Podcast launched on June 1, 2014. GGACP was a long-form interview podcast and was hosted by not only Gottfried, but his friend and professional comedy writer Frank Santopadre. Gottfried's wife Dara served as executive producer and it was recorded weekly until his death in 2022, with re-uploads of older episodes continuing afterwards in his honor.

Its title Gilbert Gottfried's Amazing Colossal Podcast is a reference to the 1957 black-and-white science fiction film The Amazing Colossal Man, directed by Bert I. Gordon. Gottfried's chaotic comedic riffing and Santopadre's earnest interviewing offered the show a style all its own.

Starting in 2015, the podcast featured shorter mini-episodes around half an hour in length on more specific topics like particular character actors, films, or songs.

=== Artistry and image ===
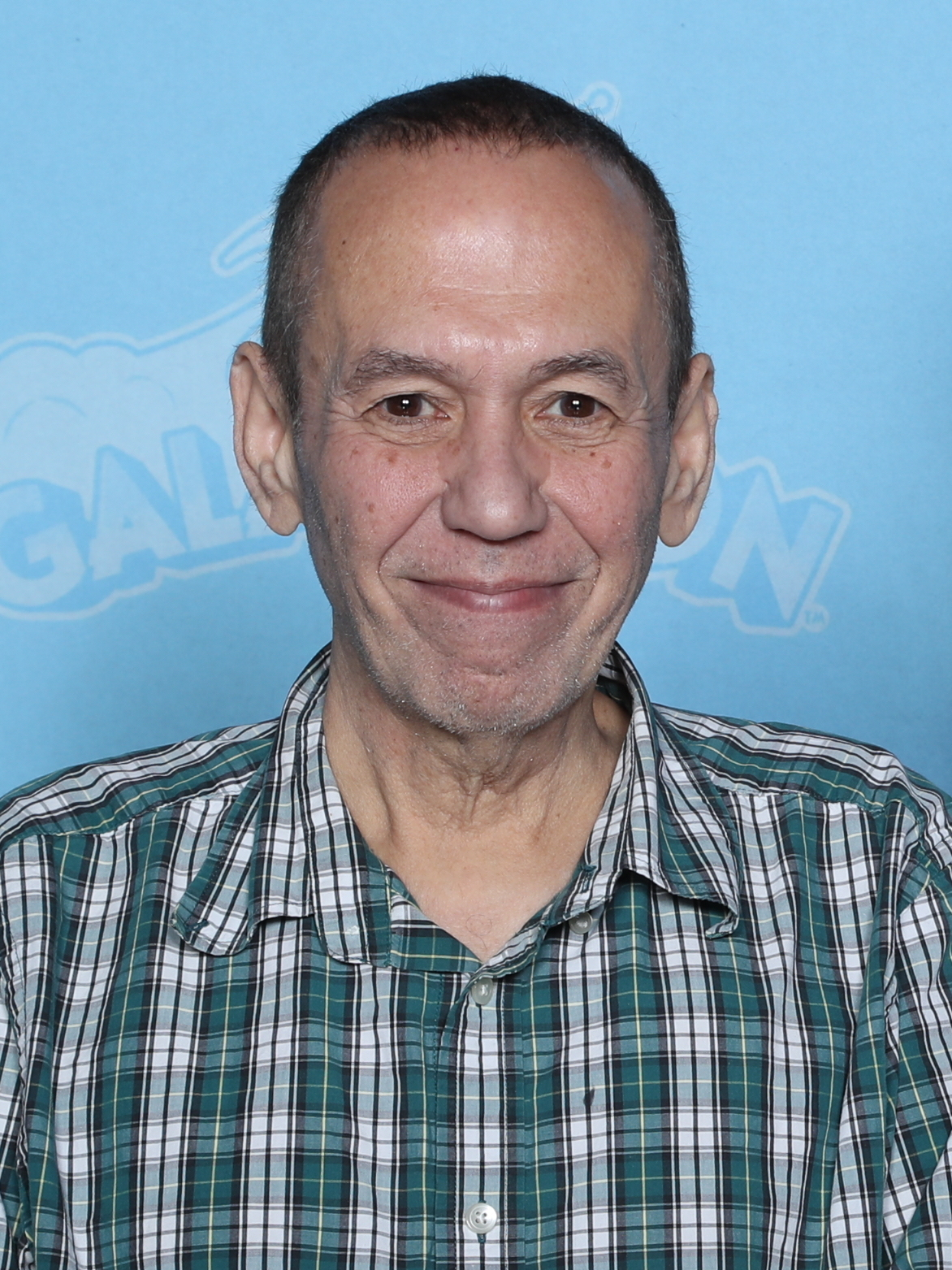
Gottfried at the 2020 GalaxyCon Richmond

Danny Gallagher of the Dallas Observer wrote that "Gottfried has one of the most original formulas in the history of comedy," adding, "You don't just laugh at the punchline when Gilbert Gottfried tells a joke. You laugh at the setup. You laugh at his comments about the joke. You even laugh at the segues between his jokes." Eric Falwell wrote of his influence in The Atlantic: "Gottfried's work as a stand-up shaped many comics today, whether they would say as much or not. He was a figure who ... pushed stand-up to move beyond the realm of the merely observational and create space for the absurd." In 2022, the Jewish Journal named him one of "The Top 10 Jewish Reality TV Stars of All Time."

Gottfried was best known for speaking in an exaggerated loud and grating voice, which was not his natural speaking voice. Mark Binneli of Rolling Stone described Gottfried as a "squinting, squawking mass of contradictions", noting his status as "one of America's filthiest stand-ups" while simultaneously being "one of the most successful voice-over artists in children's entertainment". He was also known for joking about recent tragedies, prompting fellow comedian Bill Maher to dub him the "King of Too Soon". In a July 2012 op-ed for CNN, he wrote, "I have always felt comedy and tragedy are roommates. If you look up comedy and tragedy, you will find a very old picture of two masks. One mask is tragedy. It looks like it's crying. The other mask is comedy. It looks like it's laughing. Nowadays, we would say, 'How tasteless and insensitive. A comedy mask is laughing at a tragedy mask.'"

=== Controversies ===
In 1991, at the 43rd Primetime Emmy Awards, Gottfried told a series of jokes in reference to Paul Reubens' arrest for masturbating in an adult theater, saying if "masturbation's a crime, I should be on death row." Viewers in the Eastern time zone saw the entire set live, but Fox censored the broadcast for the West Coast delay. Fox issued an apology, calling the jokes "irresponsible and insulting". Gottfried said that producers stated he would not be invited back and Rolling Stone wrote that the monologue resulted in his blacklisting.

During his monologue at a Friars Club roast of Hugh Hefner, 3 weeks after the September 11 attacks, Gottfried joked that he had intended to catch a plane, but could not get a direct flight because "they said they have to stop at the Empire State Building first". This was one of the first public examples of 9/11 humor. Audience members responded with hisses and a cry of "too soon!". Gottfried later stated he thought "too soon" meant he did not take a long enough pause before the punchline. Realizing he had lost the audience "bigger than anybody has ever lost an audience", Gottfried abandoned his prepared remarks and launched into the famous Aristocrats joke, which won back the audience. Penn Jillette and Paul Provenza used Gottfried's monologue as a segment in their 2005 film The Aristocrats.

On March 14, 2011, Gottfried tweeted 12 jokes about the earthquake disaster in Japan which had occurred three days before. Aflac, which does 75% of its business in Japan, responded by dismissing Gottfried from voicing its mascot and announcing a casting call for his replacement, despite Gottfried later apologizing for his jokes. He was replaced by Daniel McKeague (who did an impression of Gottfried) on April 26.

== Personal life ==
In 1992, Gottfried suffered from appendicitis and was rushed to a hospital for emergency surgery. The treatment was successful.

In the late 1990s, he met Dara Kravitz at a Grammy Awards party. They married in 2007 and had two children. He was a longtime resident of the Chelsea neighborhood of Manhattan.

Gottfried was known for his frugality. He often walked instead of using public transportation because he did not want to pay the fares. Illustrator Drew Friedman recalled that Gottfried would visit his apartment unannounced in the late 1980s to watch films on his VCR because he did not want to buy one of his own.

== Death ==
On April 12, 2022, at 2:35 pm. ET, Gottfried died at a Manhattan hospital of recurrent ventricular tachycardia, complicated by type II myotonic dystrophy, which he had privately suffered with for many years. He was 67 years old.

His family released a statement on his Twitter account, writing: "We are heartbroken to announce the passing of our beloved Gilbert Gottfried after a long illness. In addition to being the most iconic voice in comedy, Gilbert was a wonderful husband, brother, friend and father to his two young children. Although today is a sad day for all of us, please keep laughing as loud as possible in Gilbert's honor."

A funeral was held for Gottfried on April 14 in Westchester County, New York. Celebrities who attended the service itself at Riverside Memorial Chapel were Jeff Ross (who delivered Gottfried's eulogy), Colin Quinn, Susie Essman, Mario Cantone, Dave Attell, and Paul Shaffer, as well as Bob Saget's widow Kelly Rizzo and his three daughters. Whoopi Goldberg, though not in attendance for the funeral, sent a gift in honor of Gottfried. Sarah Silverman had planned on sitting shiva with a slew of Gottfried's friends and family.

His casket was buried in the Sharon Gardens section of Kensico Cemetery in Valhalla, New York, with the epitaph on his gravestone reading, "Too Soon", a double entendre referring to his Friars Club controversy, as well as his early death.

== Legacy ==
Gottfried had been scheduled to appear as a special guest at the Ebertfest film festival to discuss Gilbert, the documentary film about him. Ebertfest announced it would dedicate its 2022 event to Gottfried and Sidney Poitier. Gottfried was also posthumously inducted into the Rondo Hatton Classic Horror Awards' Monster Kid Hall of Fame.

The 2023 video game Justice League: Cosmic Chaos is dedicated to Gottfried's memory as he was to reprise his role as Mister Mxyzptlk; Dana Snyder recorded the part in his place. Mortal Kombat Legends: Cage Match is dedicated to Gottfried, where he voiced David Doubldy in a posthumous credit.

== Filmography ==
=== Film ===
| Year | Title | Role | Notes |
|---|---|---|---|
| 1984 | The House of God | Paramedic | |
| 1985 | Bad Medicine | Tony Sandoval | |
| 1987 | Beverly Hills Cop II | Sidney Bernstein | |
| 1988 | Hot to Trot | Dentist | |
| 1989 | Never on Tuesday | Lucky Larry Lupin | |
| 1990 | The Adventures of Ford Fairlane | Johnny Crunch | Nominated — Golden Raspberry Award for Worst Supporting Actor |
| 1990 | Seriously...Phil Collins | Roger | |
| 1990 | Problem Child | Mr. Peabody | Nominated – Golden Raspberry Award for Worst Supporting Actor |
| 1990 | Look Who's Talking Too | Joey | Nominated – Golden Raspberry Award for Worst Supporting Actor |
| 1991 | Problem Child 2 | Mr. Peabody | |
| 1991 | Horror Hall of Fame 2 | Boris | |
| 1992 | Highway to Hell | Hitler | |
| 1992 | Aladdin | Iago | Voice |
| 1994 | House Party 3 | Luggage Clerk | |
| 1994 | Thumbelina | Berkeley Beetle | Voice |
| 1994 | The Return of Jafar | Iago | Voice, direct-to-video |
| 1994 | Saved by the Bell: Wedding in Las Vegas | Burt Banner | |
| 1994 | Double Dragon | Walter | |
| 1995 | Problem Child 3: Junior in Love | Dr. Peabody | |
| 1996 | Aladdin and the King of Thieves | Iago | Voice, direct-to-video |
| 1996 | Be Cool about Fire Safety! | Seemore Smoke | Voice |
| 1996 | Escape from It's a Wonderful Life | Angry man on porch | |
| 1997 | Meet Wally Sparks | Mr. Harry Karp | |
| 1997 | Def Jam's How to Be a Player | Tony the Doorman | |
| 1998 | Dr. Dolittle | Compulsive Dog | Voice |
| 1999 | Goosed | Alan Levy | |
| 2001 | Longshot | Mr. Chadwick | |
| 2002 | Mickey's House of Villains | Iago | Voice, direct-to-video |
| 2004 | The Amazing Floydini | Magic Store Owner | |
| 2004 | Back by Midnight | Security Guard | |
| 2004 | Funky Monkey | Dr. Spleen | |
| 2004 | Lemony Snicket's A Series of Unfortunate Events | Duck | Voice, uncredited |
| 2005 | The Aristocrats | Himself | Documentary |
| 2006 | Farce of the Penguins | "I'm Freezing My Nuts Off" Penguin | Voice |
| 2007 | Disney Princess Enchanted Tales: Follow Your Dreams | Iago | Voice, direct-to-video |
| 2008 | Gilbert Gottfried: Dirty Jokes | Himself | |
| 2009 | The Lindabury Story | Himself | |
| 2009 | Jack and the Beanstalk | Grayson the Goose | |
| 2011 | Miss December | Police Officer | |
| 2013 | Beecher Baby Bouncer | Himself | Short |
| 2014 | A Million Ways to Die in the West | Abraham Lincoln | |
| 2016 | The Comedian's Guide to Survival | Himself | |
| 2016 | The Last Laugh | Himself | Documentary |
| 2016 | Director's Cut | Superintendent | |
| 2016 | Unbelievable!!!!! | Himself | |
| 2016 | Gender Bender | Dr. Montalto | |
| 2016 | Life, Animated | Himself | Documentary |
| 2016 | The Comedian | Himself | |
| 2016 | Hospital Arrest | Jerome Carter | |
| 2017 | Gilbert | Himself | Documentary |
| 2017 | 80s Creature House | Grim Reaper | |
| 2017 | Animal Crackers | Mario Zucchini | Voice |
| 2018 | Abnormal Attraction | Pig Man | |
| 2018 | Boy Band | Mort | Voice |
| 2019 | Super Gidget | Infestor | Voice, short |
| 2020 | A Wrestling Christmas Miracle | Rice | |
| 2020 | The Truth About Santa Claus | Dr. Leland | |
| 2023 | Mortal Kombat Legends: Cage Match | David Doubldy | Voice; Direct-to-video; posthumous release (final film role); dedicated in memory |
| 2023 | A Disturbance in the Force | Himself | Documentary; posthumous release |

=== Television ===
| Year | Title | Role | Notes |
|---|---|---|---|
| 1980–1981 | Saturday Night Live | Various characters | Cast member; 12 episodes |
| 1983–1984 | Thicke of the Night | Various characters | |
| 1987 | The Cosby Show | Mr. Babcock | Episode: "Say Hello to a Good Buy" |
| 1989–1998 | USA Up All Night | Saturday night host | |
| 1990 | Superboy | Nick Knack | 2 episodes |
| 1991 | Night Court | Oscar Brown | Recurring role |
| 1993–1994 | Bonkers | Two-Bits | Voice, 2 episodes |
| 1993–1994 | Bobby's World | Karate Sensei, Mad Scientist | Voice, 2 episodes |
| 1993–1994 | Late Night with Conan O'Brien | Various skits | |
| 1993 | Problem Child | Mr. Peabody | Voice, main role |
| 1994 | Silk Stalkings | Joey Mellman | Episode: "The Mud-Queen Murders" |
| 1994 | Living Single | Larry Friedlander | Episode: "Double Indignity" |
| 1994 | The Ren & Stimpy Show | Jerry the Bellybutton Elf / Adonis | Voice, episode: "Jerry the Bellybutton Elf" |
| 1994–1995 | Aladdin | Iago | Voice, main role, 83 episodes |
| 1994–1995 | Wings | Lewis | Guest role; 3 episodes |
| 1994–1997 | Duckman | Art DeSalvo | Voice, 4 episodes |
| 1995 | Married... with Children | Himself | Episode: "Ship Happens" |
| 1995 | Adventures in Wonderland | Mike McNasty | Episode: "Pie Noon" |
| 1995 | The Parent 'Hood | Pizza Manager | Episode: "Pizza Man" |
| 1995 | Mad About You | Spanky's Master | Episode: "The Couple" |
| 1995 | Bump in the Night | Stink Bug | Voice, episode: "Love Stinks" |
| 1995 | Aladdin on Ice | Iago | Voice, television film |
| 1995 | Are You Afraid of the Dark? | Roy | Episode: "The Tale of Station 109.1" |
| 1995 | In the House | Mr. Comstock | Episode: "Home Again" |
| 1995 | Escape From It's a Wonderful Life | Angry Man on Porch | Television film |
| 1996 | Clueless | DMV Examiner | Episode: "Driving Me Crazy"" |
| 1997–1998 | Superman: The Animated Series | Mister Mxyzptlk | Voice, 2 episodes |
| 1997 | Muppets Tonight | Himself | Episode: "Dennis Quaid" |
| 1997 | The Weird Al Show | Gilbert: Weird Al's Imaginary Friend | Episode: "Al Gets Robbed" |
| 1998 | Cosby | Cellmate | Episode: "Fifteen Minutes of Fame" |
| 1998 | Noddy | Jack Frost | Episode: "Jack Frost is Coming to Town" |
| 1998 | Big Bag | Muchachos the Hamster | "Troubles the Cat" segments |
| 1998 | Saturday Night Live | Napoleon ("Titey" short) | Voice, episode: "Steve Buscemi/Third Eye Blind" |
| 1998–1999 | Hercules | Minister Cleon | Voice, episode: "Hercules and the Assassin" |
| 1998–2004 | Hollywood Squares | Himself | Regular |
| 1999 | Dilbert | Accounting Troll | Voice, episode: "Hunger" |
| 1999 | Dr. Katz, Professional Therapist | Himself | 2 episodes |
| 1999 | Timon & Pumbaa | Snicklefritz The Woodpecker | Voice, episode: "Mozam-Beaked" |
| 2000 | Clerks: The Animated Series | Jerry Seinfeld, Patrick Swayze | Voice, 2 episodes |
| 2001–2002 | The Fairly OddParents | Dr. Bender, Wendell Bender | Voices, 3 episodes |
| 2001–2003 | House of Mouse | Iago | Voice, Recurring role |
| 2002–2022 | Cyberchase | Digit, Widget | Voice, main role Daytime Emmy [Nominee] Outstanding New Approaches – Daytime Children's; Daytime Emmy Awards 2007 |
| 2002 | Bear in the Big Blue House | Large Possum | Voice, episode: "Welcome to Woodland Valley Part 2" |
| 2002 | Son of the Beach | Noccus Johnstein | 2 episodes |
| 2002 | Celebrity Deathmatch | Himself | Voice, episode: "Gottfried in the Arena" |
| 2003 | Becker | Alan | Episode: "A First Class Flight" |
| 2003 | CSI: Crime Scene Investigation | Comic | Episode: "Last Laugh" |
| 2004 | Home Movies | Tonto the Parrot | Voice, episode: "Honkey Magoo" |
| 2004 | The Tonight Show with Jay Leno | Various characters | Recurring role |
| 2004 | Celebrity Paranormal Project | Himself | |
| 2004 | I Love Toys | Himself | |
| 2004 | Bravo's 100 Scariest Movie Moments | Himself | Part I: 100-81 |
| 2005 | Billy & Mandy Save Christmas | Santa Claus | Voice, television film |
| 2007 | The Emperor's New School | Potion | Voice, episode: "Emperor's New Musical" |
| 2007 | My Gym Partner's a Monkey | Rick Platypus | Voice, episode: "That Darn Platypus" |
| 2007 | Family Guy | Gilbert Gottfried Horse | Episode: "Boys Do Cry" |
| 2008 | Hannah Montana | Barney Bitman | Episode: "(We're So Sorry) Uncle Earl" |
| 2008 | I Love the New Millennium | Himself | 4 episodes |
| 2008 | Comedy Central Roast: Bob Saget | Himself | |
| 2008 | The Replacements | Himself | Voice, episode: "A Buzzwork Orange" |
| 2008 | Sesame Street | Denny the Distractor | Episode: "Hurry Up, You're Running Out of Time" |
| 2008 | The View | Horny the Dwarf | Episode: "Joy's Month in ReView" |
| 2008 | SeeMore's Playhouse | Himself | Episode: "Marching Orders" |
| 2008 | Pyramid | Celebrity Guest | |
| 2009 | Star-ving | "Gilbert's Kid" | |
| 2009 | Comedy Central Roast: Joan Rivers | Himself | |
| 2009 | Seth MacFarlane's Cavalcade of Cartoon Comedy | Himself | |
| 2009 | Back at the Barnyard | Barn Buddy | Voice, episode: "The Barn Buddy" |
| 2010 | 'Til Death | Tommy | 2 episodes |
| 2010 | Robotomy | Tickle Me Psycho | Voice, episode: "The Playdate" |
| 2010 | Comedy Central Roast: David Hasselhoff | Himself | |
| 2011 | Comedy Central Roast: Donald Trump | Himself | |
| 2011 | Roast of Facebook | Twitter | |
| 2011 | Law & Order: Special Victims Unit | Leo Gerber | 2 episodes |
| 2012 | Comedy Central Roast: Roseanne Barr | Himself | |
| 2012 | The Burn with Jeff Ross | Himself | |
| 2013–2014 | World's Dumbest... | Himself | |
| 2013 | Rachael vs. Guy: Celebrity Cook-Off | Himself | |
| 2013 | Celebrity Wife Swap | Himself | Episode: "Gilbert Gottfried/Alan Thicke" |
| 2013 | Mad | Linkong, Father, Crash | Voice; episode: "Linkong / Rainbow Dash & Bernstein" |
| 2014 | Randy Cunningham: 9th Grade Ninja | Ranginald Bagel | Voice, episode: "Bring Me the Head of Ranginald Bagel" |
| 2014 | The Celebrity Apprentice | Himself | The Celebrity Apprentice 7 |
| 2014 | Dinner with Friends with Brett Gelman and Friends | Himself | |
| 2014 | Elf: Buddy's Musical Christmas | Mr. Greenway | Voice, television film |
| 2014 | Last Comic Standing | Himself | |
| 2014 | Big Brother | Otev | Voice, Big Brother 16 |
| 2014 | Infomercials | Himself | Episode: Newbridge Tourism Board Presents: We're Newbridge, We're Comin' To Get Ya! |
| 2014 | Anger Management | Dudley | Episode: "Charlie and Lacey Go For Broke" |
| 2014–2016 | Teenage Mutant Ninja Turtles | Kraang Subprime | Voice, recurring role |
| 2016 | Mighty Magiswords | Prohyas' Stomach | Voice, episode: "Gut Feelings" |
| 2016 | Sharknado: The 4th Awakens | Ron McDonald | Television film |
| 2017–2019 | Last Week Tonight with John Oliver | Jared Kushner / Himself | 4 episodes |
| 2017 | The Marvelous Mrs. Maisel | Strip Club MC | Episode: "Pilot" |
| 2017 | Justice League Action | Mister Mxyztplk | Voice, 3 episodes |
| 2017 | Sharknado 5: Global Swarming | Ron McDonald | Television film |
| 2017 | Episodes | Himself | Season 5, Episode 1 |
| 2017 | Cash Cab | Himself | |
| 2017 | The Untitled Action Bronson Show | Himself | Season 1, Episode 7 |
| 2018 | Crashing | Himself | Episode: "The Atheist" |
| 2018 | The Last Sharknado: It's About Time | Rand McDonald | Television film |
| 2018 | The Tom and Jerry Show | Genie | Voice, episode: "Meanie Genie" |
| 2018 | Arrested Development | ShoeDini Advertiser | Voice, episode: "Sinking Feelings" |
| 2018 | Bumping Mics with Jeff Ross & Dave Attell | Himself | |
| 2018 | Jay Leno's Garage | Himself | Episode: "In Harm's Way" |
| 2018 | Family Guy | Dog Whistle | Voice, episode: "Big Trouble in Little Quahog" |
| 2019 | The Late Show with Stephen Colbert | Himself, Redaction, Samantha, Lord Sexy | 3 episodes |
| 2019 | Critters: A New Binge | Uncle | Recurring role |
| 2019 | Historical Roasts | Adolf Hitler | Episode: "Anne Frank" |
| 2019 | SpongeBob SquarePants | Himself; Sal | Episode: "SpongeBob's Big Birthday Blowout"; Voice, Episode: "The Hankering" |
| 2019 | Teen Titans Go! | Coal Miner | Voice, episode: "Christmas Crusaders" |
| 2020 | Karate Tortoise | Rat Bastard | Episode: "Legend of the Shelled Vigilante" |
| 2021 | Kamp Koral: SpongeBob's Under Years | Shecky | Voice, episode: "Wise Kraken" |
| 2021 | Too Soon: Comedy After 9/11 | Himself | Television documentary film |
| 2021 | Pyramid | Celebrity Guest | |
| 2022 | Smiling Friends | God | Voice, episode: "Charlie Dies and Doesn't Come Back" |
| 2022 | The Paloni Show! Halloween Special! | Gott F. Reed | Voice, posthumous release |
| 2022 | Somebody Feed Phil | Himself | Episode: "Croatia", posthumous release |
| 2022 | Paradise PD | Himself | Voice, episode: "Diddy's Home", posthumous release |
| 2023 | Royal Crackers | The Fixer | Voice, episode: "Theo's Comeback Tour", posthumous release; dedicated in memory |
| 2023 | The Patrick Star Show | Shecky | Voice, episode: "Get Off My Lawnie", posthumous release |
| 2023 | Family Guy | Himself, Stewie Griffin (Gilbert Gottfried personality) | Voice, episode: "White Meg Can't Jump", posthumous release; dedicated in memory |

=== Video games ===
| Year | Title | Role | Notes |
|---|---|---|---|
| 1999 | Disney's Arcade Frenzy | Iago | |
| 2001 | Disney's Aladdin in Nasira's Revenge | Iago | |
| 2002 | Kingdom Hearts | Iago | |
| 2006 | Kingdom Hearts II | Iago | |
| 2014 | Kingdom Hearts HD 2.5 Remix | Iago | Re:Coded HD version only |
| 2014 | Lego Batman 3: Beyond Gotham | Mister Mxyzptlk | |
| 2018 | Lego DC Super-Villains | Mister Mxyzptlk | |
| 2020 | Angry Video Game Nerd 1 & 2 Deluxe | Fred Fuchs | |
| 2024 | Teenage Mutant Ninja Turtles: Wrath of the Mutants | Kraang Sub-prime | Posthumous release |

=== Web ===
| Year | Title | Role | Notes |
|---|---|---|---|
| 2012 | CollegeHumor | Himself | Episode: "Gilbert Gottfried Reads 50 Shades of Grey" |
| 2017 | Hello From the Magic Tavern | Cockroach Clown (voice) | Episode: "Dark Lord's Birthday Party" |
| 2019 | The Adventures of Nick | Himself | Episode: "Love Just Got Fried" |
| 2019 | Angry Video Game Nerd | Fred Fuchs | Episode: "Life of Black Tiger" |
| 2020–2022 | The Adventures of Autism Cat | Hindaril | 2 episodes |
| 2021 | SicCooper | Himself | Episode: "We Purchased Another Small Sega Master System Collection + More!" |
| 2023 | Danny's House | Himself | Episode: "Danny Brown Shocks Gilbert Gottfried With His Dreams", posthumous release |
| TBA | Shrek 2 Retold | Announcer | Posthumous release |

=== Commercials ===
- MTV (1980s)
- Pepsi (1991)
- Pop-Tarts: Voice of the Toaster (1995)
- Aflac: Voice of the Aflac duck (2000–2011)
- Subway (2000)
- Office XP: Voice of Clippy (2001)
- Glad (2003)
- Shoedini (2010)
- Easterns Automotive Group commercials (2012)
- Eat24 (2015 Super Bowl commercial)

== Discography ==
| Year | Artist | Title | Role | Label | Formats |
|---|---|---|---|---|---|
| 1986 | Zee | Make My Day (With Your Love Tonight) | "tough guy vocals" | Warlock Records | 12" single |
| 1992 | Bob & Tom | We Three Kings | featured on "Censored" | Big Mouth Creative Services | CD, cassette |
| 1995 | various | Magical Selections from the Original Motion Picture Soundtrack of Disney's Aladdin | performer on "I'm Looking Out for Me" & "Forget About Love" (duet with Liz Callaway) | Walt Disney Records | CD, cassette |
| 2005 | Gilbert Gottfried | Dirty Jokes | n/a | Image Entertainment | CD/DVD |
| 2021 | The Balls Project | A Momentary Lapse of Balls | spoken word on "Learning to Shit" | n/a (self-released) | digital |
| 2024 | Gilbert Gottfried | Still Screaming | n/a | 800 Pound Gorilla Records | Vinyl, digital |

=== Featured recordings ===
- Disney Princess Enchanted Tales: Follow Your Dreams (2007), for "Peacock Princess" (sung with Lea Salonga)
