= Too Soon: Comedy After 9/11 =

2021 TV documentary film

- Directed by: Nick Scown; Julie Seabaugh
- Composer: Greg Nicolett
- Original language: English

Production
- Executive producers: Falguni Lakhani; Dan Baglio; Marisa Clifford; Sean Hayes; Todd Milliner; Nick Scown; Julie Seabaugh
- Producers: Tammy Chu; Ben Heins; Scott Recchia; Benjamin Stephen
- Cinematography: Milton Santiago; Dennis Zanatta
- Editors: Caitlin Dinoski; Nick Scown
- Running time: 90 minutes

Original release
- Network: Vice TV
- Release: September 8, 2021

Too Soon: Comedy After 9/11 is a 2021 television documentary film produced by Pulse Films, Vice TV and Hazy Mills Productions, and directed by Nick Fituri Scown and Julie Seabaugh. The film chronicles the role of comedy in the aftermath of the September 11 attacks. The film premiered on September 8, 2021 on Vice TV.

The documentary features interviews with many comedians and actors, including Gilbert Gottfried, Lewis Black, Matthew Broderick, Jimmy Carr, Cedric the Entertainer, David Cross, Janeane Garofalo, Nathan Lane, Marc Maron, Russell Peters, Michael Schur, Doug Stanhope, and more.

== Reception ==
Too Soon received positive reviews and currently holds a 100% fresh rating on Rotten Tomatoes, with six reviews. James Poniewozik of The New York Times called the film "smart and surprisingly cathartic," and Alan Ng of Film Threat called it "a must-see film for any rising comedian."
