= Monkey See, Monkey Don't! =

- The Ren & Stimpy Show episode
- Episode no.: Season 2 Episode 7a
- Directed by: Bob Camp
- Story by: Bob Camp; Vincent Waller
- Production code: RS5-13A
- Original air date: February 13, 1993

Episode chronology
| ← Previous "Son of Stimpy" | Next → "Fake Dad" |

"Monkey See, Monkey Don't!" is the thirteenth episode of the second season of The Ren & Stimpy Show. It aired on Nickelodeon in the United States on February 13, 1993, much earlier than originally intended due to production difficulties in later episodes.

== Plot ==
Ren and Stimpy are once again hungry and homeless; after watching a boy feeding an elephant peanuts, they decide to get free food and residence by disguising themselves as monkeys. Despite Stimpy foolishly calling himself a cat, the zookeeper does not recognize the deception and throws them into the enclosure.

Ren is content with his residence, while Stimpy manages to stick a branch into his nose and ear, much to Ren's annoyance. Ren shakes hands with Filthy, the other monkey in the enclosure, only for Filthy to vomit (offscreen) on Ren's hand. Ren tries to teach Stimpy how to be a monkey; instead of breaking into song, he should do a trapeze performance, which Ren fails horribly. Stimpy manages to imitate with his nose, grabbing onto objects in the air.

Ren and Stimpy are annoyed by the flies and vermin swarming their suits; Filthy plucks a termite off Stimpy's ear, salts the termite and eats it. Ren wants Filthy to groom him in a similar way, only to be forced to eat a bug, which bites his tongue; he chews it for a long time before finally swallowing.

The young boy from earlier and his father visits the enclosure, where Filthy performs a dance and makes silly faces; they are amused and give Filthy actual food. They give Stimpy nut shells and pre-chewed gum and Ren a rock for their abysmal reenactment. Stimpy likes the snack while Ren is furious, throwing the rock into the kid's face after the kid giggles amusedly.

Ren and Stimpy find themselves served with "monkey chow", which is a mix of fishheads and rotten food; Ren demands the zookeeper transfer them to another enclosure. In their new enclosure, Ren and Stimpy respectively fulfill the roles of oxpecker and hippopotamus, ironically fulfilling their intentions of living in the zoo without fear of competition.

== Cast ==
- Ren – voice of Billy West
- Stimpy – voice of Billy West
- Zookeeper – voice of Billy West
- Filthy – voice of Billy West

== Production ==
For the second season of The Ren & Stimpy Show, production was split into an "A" unit headed by the showrunner John Kricfalusi and a "B" unit headed by Bob Camp. "Monkey See, Monkey Don't!" was one of the "B" episodes directed by Camp. The episode was set to premiere in the fall of 1992, but had fallen behind schedule by the summer of 1992 as Camp had was reported to have "spent an irregularly long time" in doing the storyboards for "Monkey See, Monkey Don't!". The firing of Kricfalusi on September 21, 1992, and the replacement of Spümcø with Games Animation, greatly hindered the production of "Monkey See, Monkey Don't!". As Kricfalusi was fired before voice acting commenced, Billy West provided the voice for Ren.

== Reception ==
The episode met with negative reviews and is considered by critics to be the worst episode of the second season, if not the entire series. American journalist Thad Komorowski gave the episode three out of five stars; he wrote the idea of Ren and Stimpy living in their own feces to obtain inedible food was "repellant", the jokes were unfunny, and West gave a "high-pitched and grating performance" as Ren. American critics Daniel Goldmark and Yuval Taylor praised the use of classical music in the episode, but wrote that the gross-out gags in the episode were as disgusting as they were unfunny.

== Books ==
- Dobbs, G. Michael (2015). Escape – How Animation Broke into the Mainstream in the 1990s. Orlando: BearManor Media. ISBN 1593931107.
- Komorowski, Thad (2017). Sick Little Monkeys: The Unauthorized Ren & Stimpy Story. Albany, Georgia: BearManor Media. ISBN 978-1629331836.
- Goldmark, Daniel; Taylor, Yuval (2002). The Cartoon Music Book. New York: A Cappella. ISBN 9781556524738.
