= Arlene Gottfried =

American photographer (1950–2017)

- Born: Arlene Harriet Gottfried; August 26, 1950; Coney Island, New York, U.S.
- Died: August 8, 2017 (aged 66); Manhattan, New York, U.S.
- Resting place: Beth Moses Cemetery
- Education: Fashion Institute of Technology
- Known for: Photography
- Relatives: Gilbert Gottfried (brother)

Arlene Harriet Gottfried (August 26, 1950 – August 8, 2017) was a New York City street photographer who was known for recording the candid scenes of ordinary daily life in some of the city's less well-to-do neighborhoods. Her work was not widely known until she was in her 50s.

== Early life and education ==
Born in Coney Island, she was the daughter of Lillian (Zimmerman), a homemaker, and Max Gottfried, who ran a hardware store with his own father, above which the family lived. Gottfried was the older sister of comedian and actor Gilbert Gottfried (1955–2022) and Karen Gottfried. When she was nine, Arlene moved to Crown Heights, where she became heavily influenced by the nearby, fast-growing Puerto Rican community. Later in the 1970s, she moved with her Jewish immigrant family to the neighborhoods of Alphabet City and the Lower East Side.

When Gottfried was a teenager, her father gave her an old 35 mm camera, which she eventually took to Woodstock, even though she said, "I had no clue what I was doing". She credited her upbringing for giving her the ability to get intimate photographs of strangers: "We lived in Coney Island, and that was always an exposure to all kinds of people, so I never had trouble walking up to people and asking them to take their picture."

Gottfried graduated from the Fashion Institute of Technology taking photography courses.

== Photography ==
She worked as a photographer for an advertising agency before freelancing for publications such as The New York Times Magazine, Fortune, Life, the Village Voice, and The Independent (London).

In her later years, she published five books of her work: The Eternal Light (1999), Midnight (2003), Sometimes Overwhelming (2008), Bacalaitos and Fireworks (2011), and Mommie: Three Generations of Women (2015). The Eternal Light focused on a choir Gottfried first saw at a gospel fest, which also led to her discovery of her love for singing. Midnight is a series of photographs that followed a man named Midnight who struggled with schizophrenia. Sometimes Overwhelming is a compilation of her photographs in the 1970s and 1980s New York. Bacalitos and Fireworks focused on New York's Puerto Rican community in the 1970s and 1980s. Mommie: Three Generations of Women was a portrait of three generations of women in her family: her immigrant grandmother, her mother and her sister. Mommie: Three Generations of Women later received Time magazine's Best Photobook Award in 2016.

Her photographs and archives have been exhibited at the Leica Gallery in New York and Tokyo, the Smithsonian Institution in Washington, D.C., the European House of Photography (MEP), the Brooklyn Museum of Art, and the New York Public Library.

== Personal life ==
In 1991 while on assignment Gottfried photographed the Eternal Light Community Singers, eventually singing gospel with them on the Lower East Side. Gottfried also sang gospel with the Jerriese Johnson East Village Gospel Choir.

She was a regular patron of Nuyorican Poets Café. She was also a known friend of Miguel Piñero.

== Death ==
Gottfried died on August 8, 2017, from complications of breast cancer at her home in Manhattan at the age of 66 surrounded by friends and family.

== Publications ==
- The Eternal Light (Dewi Lewis, 1999)
- Midnight (powerHouse 2003)
- Sometimes Overwhelming (2008)
- Bacalaitos and Fireworks (powerHouse 2011)
- Mommie: Three Generations of Women (powerHouse 2015)
