= Fake Dad =

- The Ren & Stimpy Show episode
- Episode no.: Season 2 Episode 7b
- Directed by: John Kricfalusi; Jim Smith
- Written by: John Kricfalusi; Bob Camp
- Production code: RS5-5A
- Original air date: February 27, 1993

Episode chronology
← Previous "Monkey See, Monkey Don't!"	Next → "The Great Outdoors"

"Fake Dad" is the fourteenth episode of the second season of The Ren & Stimpy Show. It originally aired on Nickelodeon in the United States on February 27, 1993.

== Plot ==
Ren, Stimpy and Kowalski enjoy quality time together.

Ren and Stimpy decide to adopt a neglected child from Fake Dad Headquarters for the weekend. They have been assigned a seven-year-old child, but did not anticipate him to be a giant Lummox. The Lummox, named Kowalski, is serving a thirty-year prison sentence for unspecified "crimes against humanity". Ren is scared but Stimpy is excited at this new opportunity of parenting; Ren is forcibly "hugged" by Kowalski.

The trio spend the day sitting on the sofa at their caravan. Ren tries to feed Stimpy icing, not giving it to Kowalski as he does not feel Kowalski is his son; Stimpy forces him to do so, only to be unconsciously swallowed and chewed.

Kowalski breaks a chair he was sitting on while reading a book named "Prison Romance", unintentionally ripping the pages apart with his superhuman strength in a futile attempt to flip pages. Despite his relatively docile behavior and surprising literacy, his unintentional destruction had angered Ren; Stimpy chastises him for his aggression. However, Kowalski proceeds to smoke a whole pack of cigarettes, elevating the duo's tension to an uncontrollable level; after Ren whacks him with a spoon, Kowalski throws a tantrum and shreds the couch, television and Stimpy into powder, compelling Ren to stop.

The trio go on a picnic. Ren makes Kowalski a sandwich, who demands a meat sandwich; Ren gives Kowalski slabs of meat, which he finds hard to chew; Stimpy toasts meat for him, only for it to be rendered inedible. Kowalski demands a meat drink, which Stimpy provides with shredded meat from a water dispenser; Kowalski is satisfied and proceeds to blow a bubble as if it was bubble gum. Ren tries to make him burp, but does not succeed until what felt like 36 weeks later. Ren tries to punish Kowalski by whacking his buttocks, but could not do so after seeing them and realizing the errors of his ways.

The trio spend the rest of the weekend offscreen, during which Ren presumably enjoys his time parenting Kowalski. Ren willfully carries Kowalski back to the Fake Dad Headquarters, where they bid farewell; Kowalski and Ren profess their gratitude towards each other and break into tears.

== Cast ==
- John Kricfalusi as Ren
- Billy West Stimpy and Fake Dad Agent
- Harris Peet as Killer Kowalski

== Production ==
The script for "Fake Dad" was written by John Kricfalusi and Jim Smith. Production was greatly delayed at Spümcø throughout 1992, and by the time Kricfalusi was fired on September 21, 1992, only the layout stage had been completed. Kricfalusi and Smith were considered to be the only cartoonists at Spümcø capable of drawing Killer Kowalski, who was considered a difficult character to draw. Games Animation finished the episode on time for fall of 1992. Smith and Kricfalusi had wanted "Fake Dad" to be half an hour long, but Games shorted the story to 11 minutes. Both Kricfalusi and Smith were unhappy about the decision to shorten the episode, even though Smith's layouts were nearly intact in the final cut. Smith stated of the abridgment that his cartoon was "taken over by uncaring people who shoved it through". Games Animation decided to add a scene where the trio play American football to honor Kricfalusi's wish, but Jim Ballantine stated that the padding made the episode "slow and unwatchable", hence the football game was cut from the version that was aired in 1993.

== Reception ==
Thad Komorowski gave the episode four out of five stars, praising Kricfalusi's voice acting to have "blended genuine vexation and remorse" as Ren comes to care for Kowalski; he noted that it was one of the last episodes in the series to retain the charisma of the earlier episodes of the series.

== Books ==
- Dobbs, G. Michael (2015). Escape – How Animation Broke into the Mainstream in the 1990s. Orlando: BearManor Media. ISBN 978-1593931100.
- Komorowski, Thad (2017). Sick Little Monkeys: The Unauthorized Ren & Stimpy Story. Albany, Georgia: BearManor Media. ISBN 978-1629331836.
