= Jim Smith (animator) =

American animator and musician (1954–2025)

- Smith in 2010
- Born: James Carl Jobb; October 8, 1954; Lubbock, Texas, U.S.
- Died: May 2, 2025 (aged 70)
- Occupations: Animator; writer; storyboard artist; musician
- Years active: 1984–2019
- Known for: The Ren & Stimpy Show; Samurai Jack; The X's; Tiny Toon Adventures; The Ripping Friends; Mighty Mouse: The New Adventures; Batman: The Animated Series
- Spouse: ? (divorced)

James Carl Smith (né Jobb; October 8, 1954 – May 2, 2025) was an American animator and musician. He worked on Mighty Mouse: The New Adventures with his long-time working partner John Kricfalusi. Smith later briefly worked on Tiny Toon Adventures, and then along with Kricfalusi, Bob Camp and Lynne Naylor he founded Spümcø, where he co-developed The Ren & Stimpy Show (from which he departed in 1992 alongside Kricfalusi) in 1991 and The Ripping Friends in 2001. He was notable for remaining faithful to Kricfalusi, having refused to join Games Animation (though he worked on The X's after its rebranding to Nickelodeon Animation Studio), working with Kricfalusi on his projects amid other work until Cans Without Labels (2019).

== Life and career ==
Smith was born in Lubbock, Texas on October 8, 1954. He composed and played the guitar for the Ren & Stimpy music theme intro, performing alongside production assistant Scott Huml and co-worker Chris Reccardi.

His main influence is Frank Frazetta, but also Miguel Covarrubias, Chuck Jones and Jack Kirby, as well as Mad Magazine.

Smith died of a heart attack on May 2, 2025, at the age of 70. His former Spümcø colleagues Bob Camp and Richard Pursel used their respective social media profiles to pay tribute to him.

== Filmography ==
- The Get-Along Gang (1984, storyboard artist)
- Defenders of the Earth (1986, storyboard director)
- "Harlem Shuffle" – The Rolling Stones (1986, animator)
- Mighty Mouse: The New Adventures (1987–88, layout and storyboard artist)
- The Real Ghostbusters (1987, storyboard artist)
- The New Adventures of Beany and Cecil (1988, layout and storyboard artist)
- McGee and Me! (1989, animation layout)
- Troop Beverly Hills (1989, layout design; opening titles)
- Tiny Toon Adventures (1990, layout and storyboard artist)
- The Ren & Stimpy Show (1991–92, character designer, layout supervisor, layout artist, animator, background designer, developer, composer)
- Batman: The Animated Series (1992–97, character designer, storyboard artist, prop designer, layout artist, background designer)
- Cool World (1992, storyboard artist)
- What a Cartoon! (1996, additional character design; "Buy One, Get One Free")
- The Goddamn George Liquor Program (1997–98, artist)
- "I Miss You" – Björk (music video) (1997, layouts)
- X-Mas Card (short) (1997, artist)
- He-Hog the Atomic Pig (1999, layout artist)
- The New Woody Woodpecker Show (1999–2002, character designer)
- Weekend Pussy Hunt (2000, storyboard artist)
- "Fuck Her Gently" – Tenacious D (music video) (2001, layouts)
- The Oblongs (2001, character layout artist)
- The Ripping Friends (2001, character designer, storyboard artist, layout artist)
- Samurai Jack (2001–04, storyboard artist, additional storyboards, prop designer)
- Yoake no Mariko (2001, background designer, character designer)
- Commando Cork (2002, character layout artist)
- Oh Yeah! Cartoons (2002, assistant storyboard artist; "Baxter and Bananas: Monkey See, Monkey Don't")
- Poochini (2002, storyboard artist)
- Go! Go! Hypergrind (2003, stage designer)
- Ren & Stimpy "Adult Party Cartoon" (2003, character designer, layout artist, storyboard artist)
- The X's (2005–07, storyboard artist, background designer)
- "Close But No Cigar" – "Weird Al" Yankovic (2006, layouts)
- Korgoth of Barbaria (2006, art director, storyboard supervisor)
- Tenacious D in The Pick of Destiny (2006, layout artist; opening sequence only)
- Tom & Jerry Tales (2006–07, storyboard artist)
- The Mighty B! (2008–09, storyboard artist, background designer)
- Open Season 2 (2008, storyboard artist)
- The Haunted World of El Superbeasto (2009, storyboard artist)
- P.O.V. (2010, background layout artist)
- Mongo Wrestling Alliance (2011, storyboard artist)
- Scooby-Doo! Legend of the Phantosaur (2011, storyboard artist)
- YooHoo & Friends (2011, storyboard artist)
- The Looney Tunes Show (2012, storyboard artist)
- "SMS (Bangerz)" – Miley Cyrus (music video) (2013, layouts)
- Over the Garden Wall (2014, background designer)
- The Flintstones & WWE: Stone Age SmackDown! (2015, storyboard artist)
- Bigfoot Littlefoot (2019, storyboard artist)
- Cans Without Labels (2019, storyboard artist)
- Happy Happy Joy Joy: The Ren and Stimpy Story (2020, actor; as himself)
