= Richard Pursel =

American screenwriter and artist (born 1964)

- Born: Richard Dale Pursel; September 17, 1964 (age 61); Milford, Michigan, U.S.
- Occupations: Screenwriter, storyboard artist
- Years active: 1989–present

Richard Dale Pursel (born September 17, 1964) is an American television writer, screenwriter and storyboard artist. He is known for his work on Nickelodeon's television series The Ren & Stimpy Show and SpongeBob SquarePants.

== Career ==
Pursel was born in Milford, Michigan and was childhood best friends with Matt Wayne. After graduating from Milford High School in 1982, both intended to pursue a career in art. Pursel did odd jobs in his twenties, such as being a production assistant in music videos, fetching items for Prince, supervising staff at a school for the blind and farming in Israel.

Pursel first entered the animation industry by being recommended by future co-worker Eddie Fitzgerald to work on Tiny Toon Adventures at Warner Bros. Animation. He was hired in 1992 as John Kricfalusi's assistant at Spümcø and worked on The Ren & Stimpy Show. He was quickly promoted to writer during the second season due to Kricfalusi's appreciation of his sense of humor, prominently writing episodes through the season's heavily delayed production until Kricfalusi's firing by Nickelodeon. He refused to join Games Animation in support of Kricfalusi (and his job not being impacted by the harsh working conditions in the studio), where Bob Camp and a group of alumni had migrated to continue production of the series. He had multiple unused outlines and even loose plots for the series in the hands of Games, who used most of them for new episodes in an attempt to achieve the quality of the first two seasons; Pursel noted that the episodes produced out of the unused material were ruined due to direction from individuals such as Bill Wray. Pursel returned to Spümcø to write episodes for The Ripping Friends and Ren & Stimpy "Adult Party Cartoon" for Spike TV in 2003, calling the latter experience to be the worst work experience in his career due to his deteriorating relations with Kricfalusi; Kricfalusi would not talk to him and constantly added unnecessary shock value into his outlines, ruining the stories as Games had done. He swore off ever working with Kricfalusi again.

Pursel would be hired by Nickelodeon Animation Studio in 2005, the very studio he refused to join, to work on SpongeBob SquarePants, where former co-worker Vincent Waller served as technical director and later showrunner, amongst miscellaneous work he would do for other students. He introduced Matt Wayne to animation during this period, with both working at Warner Bros. Animation at some point. Pursel had also contributed to SpongeBob comic books.

== Filmography ==
=== Writer ===
- 1992–1993: The Ren & Stimpy Show – 4 episodes
- 1993: 2 Stupid Dogs – 5 episodes
- 1997: I Am Weasel – 4 episodes
- 1999: Weekend Pussy Hunt
- 1999: The New Woody Woodpecker Show – 4 episodes
- 2000: Poochini
- 2001–2002: The Ripping Friends – 13 episodes
- 2003: Ren & Stimpy "Adult Party Cartoon" – 8 episodes
- 2005: Robotboy – 5 episodes
- 2006: Tom and Jerry Tales – 14 episodes
- 2007–2012, 2016–2017, 2021: SpongeBob SquarePants – Staff Writer
- 2009: The Mighty B! – 1 episode
- 2011: The Super Hero Squad Show – 1 episode
- 2012–2014: Ben 10: Omniverse – 2 episodes
- 2014: Mickey Mouse – 2 episodes
- 2015: New Looney Tunes – 2 episodes
- 2016: Home: Adventures with Tip & Oh – 2 episodes

=== Screenwriter ===
- 2015: Selección Canina
- 2016: El Americano: The Movie

=== Story ===
- 1992–1993, 1995: The Ren & Stimpy Show – 11 episodes
- 1997: The Goddamn George Liquor Program – 1 episode
- 1997: I Am Weasel – 13 episodes
- 1997–1998: Cow and Chicken – 7 episodes
- 1999: The New Woody Woodpecker Show – 1 episode
- 2003: Ren & Stimpy "Adult Party Cartoon" – 4 episodes
- 2006: Tom and Jerry Tales – 4 episodes
- 2016: Home: Adventures with Tip & Oh – 2 episodes
- 2016–2019: Mighty Magiswords – 47 episodes
- 2020–2021: The Mighty Ones - 2 episodes

=== Storyboard artist ===
- 1992: The Ren & Stimpy Show – 1 episode
- 1997: I Am Weasel – 1 episode
- 2003: Ren & Stimpy "Adult Party Cartoon" – 1 episode

== Bibliography ==
Month	Title	Issue	Story	Publisher	Notes
November 2014	SpongeBob Comics	#38	"Guard Worm"	United Plankton Pictures	Story
January 2015	SpongeBob Comics	#40	"Kick the Can"	United Plankton Pictures	Story
August 2015	SpongeBob Comics	#47	"Plankton and the Amoeba Gang"	United Plankton Pictures	Story
September 2015	SpongeBob Comics	#48	"Snail Foot"	United Plankton Pictures	Story

== See also ==
- List of American writers
