= Aoki's Pizza =

Pizza restaurant chain in Japan

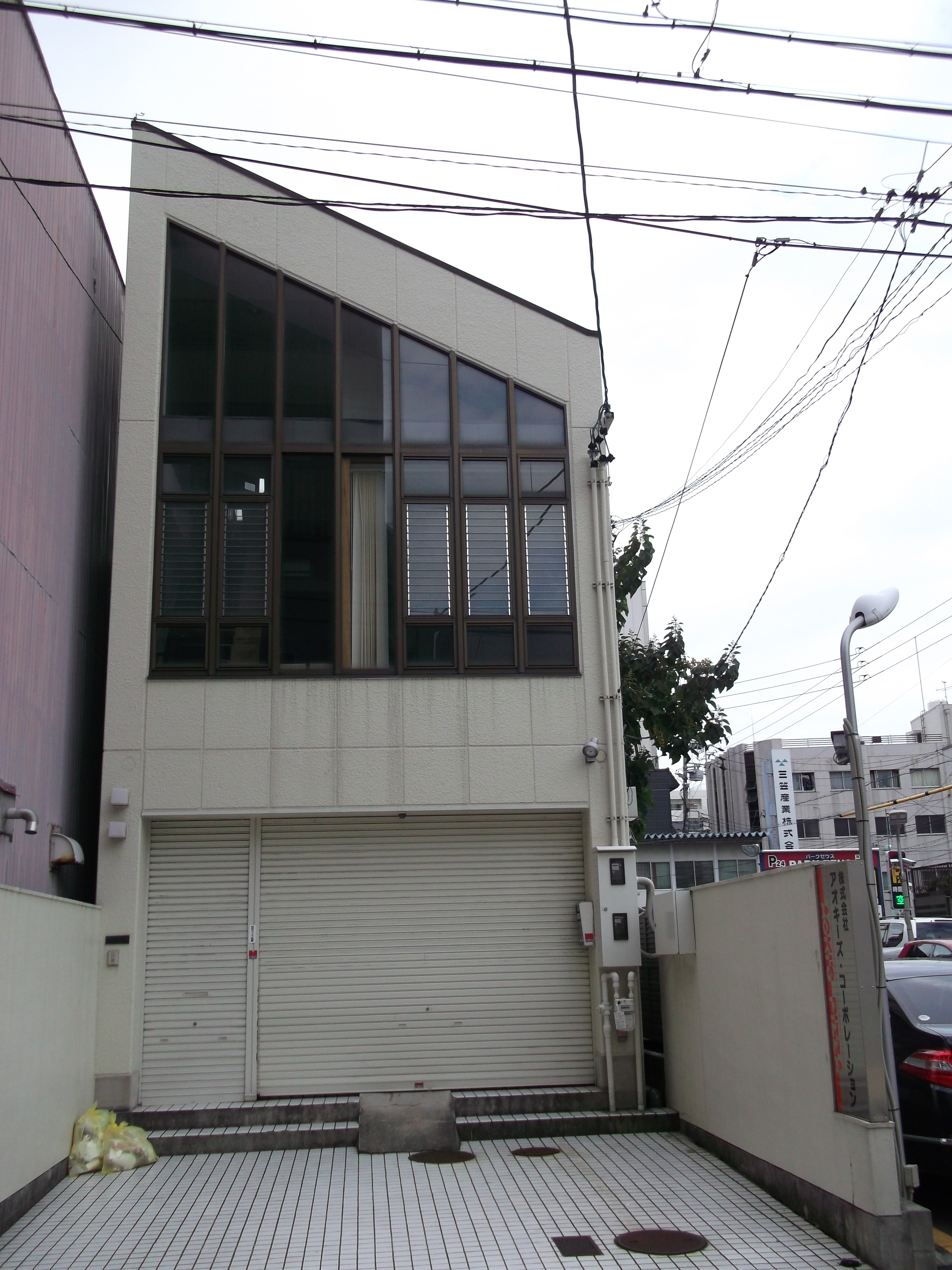
Headquarters in Nagoya

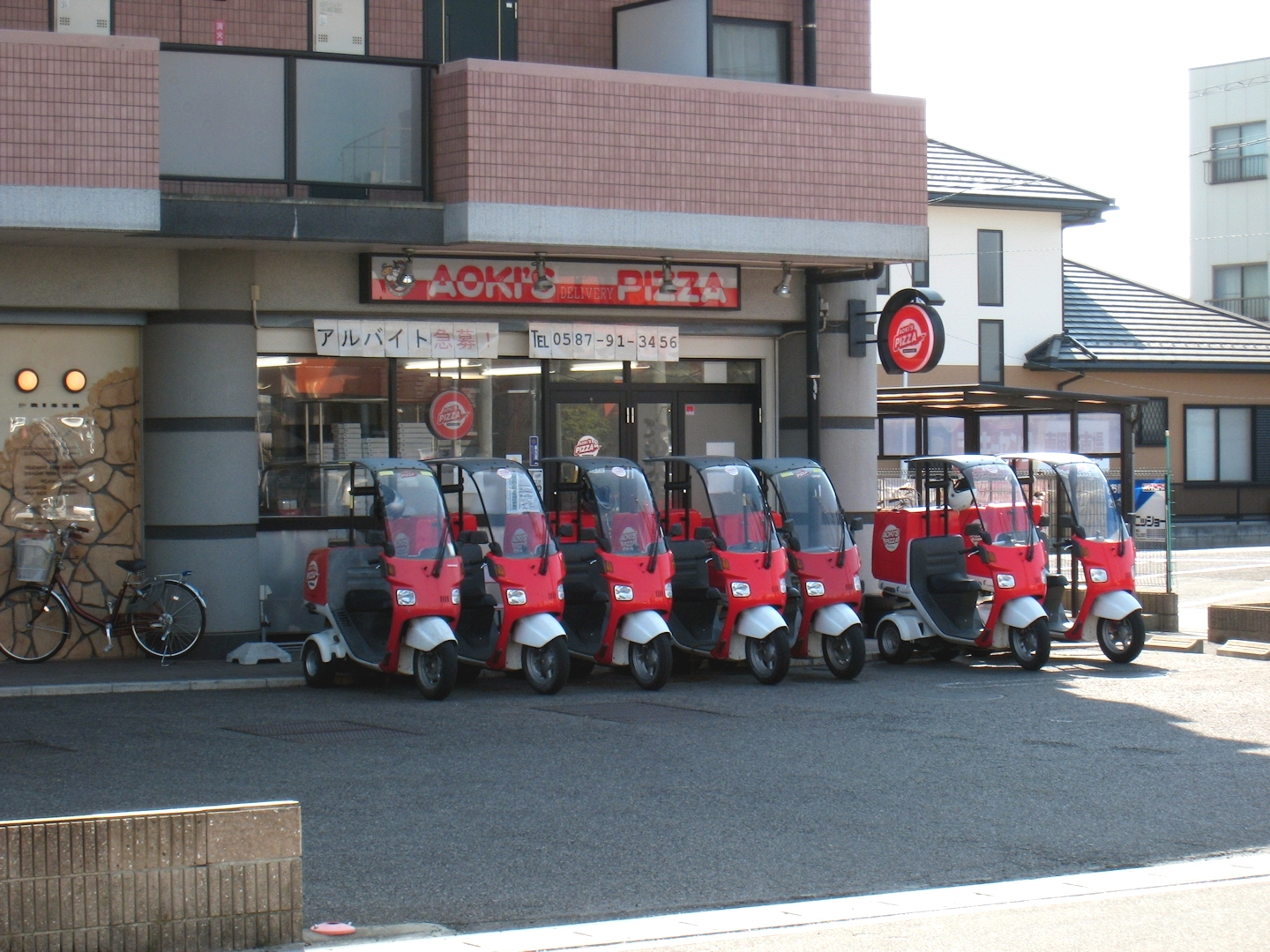
Aoki's Pizza Kashiwamori Store

Aoki's Pizza (アオキーズ・ピザ, Aokīzu Piza) is a pizza restaurant chain in Japan. It has its headquarters in Nakamura-ku, Nagoya, Aichi Prefecture. By 2008, the president and CEO of Aoki's Corporation (株式会社アオキーズ・コーポレーション, Kabushiki-gaisha Aokīzu Kōporēshon), owner of Aoki's Pizza, is Yoshimori Aoki (青木 良守, Aoki Yoshimori).

John Kricfalusi of Spümcø created an advertisement for Aoki's Pizza, with Jimmy the Idiot Boy and Sody Pop. It has offered a number of promotions, including one in connection with Microsoft Corporation's Xbox.

== History ==
Founded in September 1987, Aoki’s New York Pizza (アオキーズ・ニューヨークピザ, Aokīzu Nyūyōkupiza) opened in Nakamura-ku, Nagoya, Aichi Prefecture after the current president of Aoki’s Corporation took inspiration from a pizza delivery shop he saw during a trip to the United States. Aoki’s Corporation was incorporated in November 1988 with the chain’s name changing to what it is currently later in 1990.

== Menu ==
=== Pizza ===
==== Teriyaki Chicken Pizza ====
Introduced in 1989. This pizza took inspiration from MOS Burger’s Teriyaki Burger.

==== Q-Set ====
Introduced in 1995. The toppings for this pizza were chosen by Tsunku, lead singer of the Japanese rock band Sharam Q. The toppings included mochi, cherry tomatoes, and shredded nori all seasoned lightly with soy sauce.

Party Set

Introduced in 1996. Customers that ordered this meal could take a photo with the delivery driver who would show up in an animal costume.

Pizza Q-Train

Introduced in 1997. Delivered in a pizza box 1 meter long, this order consists of four rectangular pizzas 25 centimeters in length lined up next to each other.

Aoki’s UFO

Introduced in 1999. A pizza you can freely top with four different toppings. Two toppings could be combined to create a “half and half” pizza as well.

Xbox Campaign Set

A promotion carried out with Microsoft in 2002. Purchasing this order or any other order above 2000 yen would earn you entry into a raffle to win an Xbox or a game for the console. Pizzas delivered during this campaign came in an Xbox-themed box. This promotion would be run for a second time in 2003.

=== Pizza Customization ===
==== Cheese in Cheese ====
Introduced in 1994. Cheese in Cheese gave customers the option to have their pizza crust stuffed with cheese. The name was later changed to “Cheese-in”.

Sausage Insider

Introduced in 2003. Gave customers the option to have their pizza crust stuffed with sausage. The name was later changed to “Sausage-in”.
