= The Ripping Friends =

Animated television series

- Title card
- Also known as: The Ripping Friends: The World's Most Manly Men!
- Genre: Comedy
- Created by: John Kricfalusi
- Written by: John Kricfalusi; Richard Pursel; Robyn Byrd; Ben Jones
- Voices of: Harvey Atkin; Mark Dailey; Michael Kerr; Mike MacDonald; Merwin Mondesir; John Kricfalusi
- Composer: Steve London
- Countries of origin: United States; Canada
- No. of seasons: 1
- No. of episodes: 13

Production
- Executive producers: Annette Frymer; Kevin Kolde; Jacques Pettigrew; Arnie Zipursky
- Producers: Lynda Craigmyle; Hasmi Ferguson
- Running time: 30 minutes
- Production companies: Spümcø; Cambium; Animagic

Original release
- Network: Fox Kids (United States); Teletoon (Canada)
- Release: September 22, 2001 – December 8, 2002

The Ripping Friends: The World's Most Manly Men! (also known as The Ripping Friends) is an American-Canadian adult animated superhero comedy television series created by John Kricfalusi, creator of The Ren & Stimpy Show on Nickelodeon. The series aired for one season on Fox Kids, premiering on September 22, 2001 and ending on January 26, 2002. The show was subsequently picked up for syndication by Adult Swim, where it reran from 2002 to 2004. The show occasionally aired in Canada on Teletoon. The show also aired briefly in the United Kingdom on the CNX channel and on ABC in Australia.

== History ==
Kricfalusi and his long-time collaborator Jim Smith created the Ripping Friends before they created the similar superhero Powdered Toast Man for The Ren & Stimpy Show. After Nickelodeon fired Kricfalusi from The Ren & Stimpy Show in September 1992, he had plans to make a feature film starring the world's "manliest men". The feature film plan was scrapped, but the characters were used in The Ripping Friends. Also, as early as a 1987 story session for the Mighty Mouse: The New Adventures, Kricfalusi, who would go on to develop the concept for The Ripping Friends for around a decade, had proposed using a wad of gum as a character, an idea which was employed to create the first villain for the new series, the Indigestible Wad. The Ripping Friends was slated to premiere in September 2000 along with another Spümcø show on Fox Family, The Heartaches, which follows the adventures surrounding a girl band. The latter one never made it to television, and The Ripping Friends first aired a year later, after missing another premiere slated for May 2001, lasting for thirteen episodes. The budget was set to US$400,000 per episode. Because of production costs, the show was cancelled after one season and thirteen episodes.

Kricfalusi felt the show's animation supervisors were doing away with the Spümcø style (primarily Jim Smith's designs) and was displeased with the direction. He was not fully involved until halfway through production and considers the episodes with his involvement to be experimental. One of his contributions to the show was directing the voice actors, whom he "really worked out" so much that he was afraid he'd give one of them a heart attack, which resulted in re-casting the original voice of Crag, Harvey Atkin, with Mark Dailey. Although Kricfalusi directed the actors, he recorded for his characters separately at his home.

== Plot ==
The show focused on a group of four ultra-masculine, massively muscular superhuman brothers who attempt to fight crime from their base, RIPCOT (the Really Impressive Prototype City Of (Next) Tuesday): Crag, Rip, Slab, and Chunk Nuggett, Crag being the leader. Friends of the four include Jimmy the Idiot Boy, a mentally challenged drooling child, and their foster mother He-Mom. The villains range from the Indigestible Wad (a wad of gum who sucks moisture out of people), to the evil Euroslavian dictator Citracett, to Flathead (an invertebrate in search of a spine), to their own underpants.

Each episode was usually tagged with a short episode which Kricfalusi says was composed of "left overs". These segments were called "Rip Along with the Ripping Friends" and usually portrayed the Ripping Friends solving the problems of fans. In each segment, viewers (referred to as "kids") are asked to "rip along" with the action by ripping up paper in front of the television when coaxed to.

== Characters ==
- Crag (voiced by Harvey Atkin in the earlier appearances, Mark Dailey in later appearances) – The two-fisted scientist leader of the Ripping Friends.
- Slab (voiced by Merwin Mondesir) – African-American member of the Ripping Friends and Crag's right-hand man.
- Chunk Nuggett (voiced by Michael Kerr) – The often childish "kid brother" member of the Ripping Friends.
- Rip (voiced by Mike MacDonald) – The Kirk Douglas-style hothead of the Ripping Friends.
- Jimmy the Idiot Boy (voiced by John Kricfalusi) – The Ripping Friends' loyal, simple-minded assistant who they created from their combined DNA.
- He-Mom – The Ripping Friends' tough foster mother. Her brutal training regime and all-meat diet gives the brothers their superior strength and high pain tolerance.
- Citracett (voiced by John Kricfalusi) – An evil genius and the dictator of Euroslavia. He later rechristens himself Stinkybutt the Foul after gaining the ability to use his flatulence as a weapon.
- Dr. Jean Poole – A scientist who becomes the Ripping Friends' shared polyandrous girlfriend.

== Episodes ==
No.	Title	Original release date
1	"The Indigestible Wad"	September 22, 2001
A young girl's wad of chewing gum that she has been chewing since before she was born – the one her mother swallowed – is granted sentience/sapience from a dentist's x-ray machine that is powered by cosmic rays. The wad wanders the streets at night, sucking up people's moisture to sustain himself, turning them into "flavorless" zombies. Rip-Along: Jimmy learns how much pain a Ripping Friend could handle. Note: This episode was originally scheduled to premiere on September 15, 2001, but was postponed due to coverage of the September 11th attacks.
2	"The Infernal Wedding"	October 13, 2002 (Adult Swim)
Citracett, a villainous dictator from the fictional country of Euroslavia, decides to seduce He-Mom in an effort to get close to, and rid himself of, the Ripping Brothers, eventually asking He-Mom to marry him. The Ripping Brothers must now follow his orders "as if they were [Citracett's] own". However Rip tries to get He-Mom to see that Citracett is just using her, leading to a strain on the family. Rip-Along: None. Note: This episode was originally scheduled to premiere on September 22, 2001, but it would never air on Fox Kids due to scenes that would be considered bad taste following the September 11th attacks. It would air the following year during Adult Swim's run.
3	"Flathead's Revenge"	September 29, 2001
When the boys go swimming in the local water hole Chunk finds that he has a flatworm attached to his armpit. After being removed, the flatworm decides to take one of the brothers' back bones and then wreaks havoc on the town with some of his invertebrate brethren. Rip-Along: Rip discovers why they don't put toy prizes in cereal boxes anymore.
4	"Frictor"	October 6, 2001
When Jimmy is unable to fully sew the uniforms of the Ripping friends (due to a lack of friction from his smooth fingers) Crag decides to give Jimmy some friction, but Frictor, the master of friction, is created when the brothers' calluses are exposed to radiation. The Ripping Friends eventually track him to the moon. Rip-Along: Chunk confronts a bear who compliments a little girl's dress and calls her pretty.
5	"Rip's Shorts"	October 13, 2001
Rip's shorts alter at the molecular level after being thrown into space. The shorts become evil and take control of Jimmy and then Pooperman, causing them to do "evil" things. The other three brothers mobilize to stop the shorts. Rip-Along: None.
6	"The Ovulator"	October 27, 2001
The boys discover that there is a shortage of beef and they send Slab out to rectify the situation, as he is the only one not affected by the lack of beef in his system. He soon discovers that a mad chicken, calling himself the Ovulator, is holding cows hostage. Rip-Along: Rip discovers why hot dog buns come in a package of twelve, and hot dogs only come in a package of eight.
7	"ManMan and BoyBoy"	November 10, 2001
A duo of supposed crime fighters called ManMan and BoyBoy are wandering around "solving crimes" with white-person-flesh-colored accessories. Their brand of crime-fighting is soon revealed to be simply putting BoyBoy in peril for no good reason. Crag sets out, because he has not had his own episode yet, to foil the duo and save BoyBoy by dressing himself up as Man Friend and Jimmy as Boy Pal to save BoyBoy. Rip-Along: Jimmy and Crag teaches Pungent Puss a lesson in etiquette.
8	"Stinky Butt"	November 17, 2001
Citracett is banished to the nether regions of the Earth by the Ripping Friends after attempting to destroy it. There, due to some mystical energy, Citracett gains the ability to control his flatulence with destructive results. Rip-Along: None.
9	"The Muscle Magician"	November 24, 2001
Chunk is being made fun of by the other, 36-year-old brothers for only being 35 and a half, and therefore a "kid", so he runs away and attends a circus performance where he finds a magician who controls people's muscles. The magician, realizing the potential that Chunk poses, possesses his muscles and has him commit robbery of the many national banks in town. Rip-Along: Chunk discovers why Tommy got socks and underwear for Christmas instead of Ripping Friends action figures.
10	"Jimmy's Kidnapped"	December 8, 2002 (Adult Swim)
Citracett and a gorilla (named "Gorilla Friend" in an organ grinder monkey outfit, later "Anaxamander – the Noble Primate" in a "Pericles helmet") kidnap Jimmy the Hapless Idiot Boy after Rip harasses him into running away. The Ripping Friends track him down to find that they are torturing Jimmy so Rip knocks out the gorilla, steals his fur, and infiltrates Citracett's basement to rescue Jimmy. Rip-Along: None. Note: This episode never aired on Fox Kids due to scenes that would be considered bad taste following the September 11th attacks. It would air the following year during Adult Swim's run.
11	"Dr. Jean Poole"	January 12, 2002
The four boys get a lesson on "girls" from He-Mom and, as a final lesson, sets them up on a date with a Dr. Jean Poole. All five of them go out on the date together to the drive-in. Rip-Along: Crag discovers the people responsible for writing video game manuals and putting extra buttons on remote controls.
12	"The Man from Next Thursday, Part One"	January 19, 2002
Someone breaks into RIPCOT's secret vault and steals the Ripping Friends' "perfect" DNA, which he turns into "Riptonite" in order to kill the Ripping brothers. The intruder is revealed to be a man with an enormous thumb protruding from his chest, who claims to be a time traveler from "next Thursday". Rip-Along: None.
13	"The Man from Next Thursday, Part Two"	January 26, 2002
The man from next Thursday relates his plan to his intelligent cat, revealing that his attempts to kill the Ripping Friends are based on revenge; the Ripping Friends ripped the nail off his giant chest-thumb and then re-attached it on the wrong side, making him a freak in the world of next Thursday. Rip-Along: None.

== Censorship ==
- In a segment where Rip is asked by a fan to find out why hot dogs come in packs of twelve and hot dog buns come in packs of eight, Rip beats up a male hot dog and a female bun and asks them to "hug". The hot dog begins to slip inside the bun, and the segment immediately fades to black. The scene was restored when the episode ran on Adult Swim.
- The episodes "The Infernal Wedding" and "Jimmy's Kidnapped" never aired on Fox Kids at all, with the former being skipped due to scenes considered to be offensive following the September 11 attack. Both episodes would subsequently air on Adult Swim during reruns.

== Merchandise ==
Hearst Entertainment and Spümcø licensed Playmates Toys to create toys based on the show. However, these toys were never released. A video game based on the show developed by Software Creations was released by THQ for the Game Boy Advance, and consulted by John Kricfalusi.

== Telecast and home media ==
In the U.S., the series was first premiered on September 22, 2001 on Fox Kids until the final episode's airing on January 26, 2002. Adult Swim later picked up the show, which aired from October 6, 2002 to March 28, 2004. The show occasionally airs in Canada on Teletoon. The show also aired briefly in the United Kingdom on the CNX channel and on ABC in Australia.

Two videotapes with two episodes each were initially available with the two volumes later combined into a single DVD release with four episodes.

In Australia, the complete series was released on Region 4 DVD by Madman Entertainment.
