= Yoake no Mariko =

2001 video game

- Developer: Sony Computer Entertainment Japan (Note: Art and visuals produced by Spümcø.)
- Publisher: Sony Computer Entertainment
- Artists: John Kricfalusi; Jim Smith
- Platform: PlayStation 2
- Release: JP: 6 December 2001
- Genre: Simulation
- Modes: Single-player, multiplayer

Yoake no Mariko (Note: Japanese: 夜明けのマリコ) is a rhythm video game developed and published by Sony Computer Entertainment for the PlayStation 2. It is a collaboration between Sony and Spümcø, an American animation studio best known for producing Nickelodeon's The Ren & Stimpy Show, with founder John Kricfalusi serving as a character designer. Keiichiro Toyama, who joined Sony two years prior, serves as a gameplay designer; it was released on the same day as Ico, developed at another unit of Sony.

== Versions and sequels ==
The game was released in December 2001 exclusively to Japan and a Performance Pack was released shortly afterward. Following this, a sequel titled Yoake no Mariko 2nd Act was released on 24 January 2002, also on the PlayStation 2.

== Gameplay ==
Yoake no Mariko is a rhythm game where players must provide voice acting to correspond with a movie scene that unfolds before them. There are six levels (or scenes) in the game which include such genres as the western drama, the horror flick, and the Kung Fu action flick. As the background film clip plays, on-screen cues inform players when to deliver their lines and how to modulate their vocal intonations in a manner similar to the PaRappa the Rapper series (also published by Sony). The spoken lines are then graded by an in-game algorithm and the players are scored on their performance. Specifically considered are the players' timings, volumes, and tones.
