= John Kricfalusi =

Canadian blogger and former animator (born 1955)

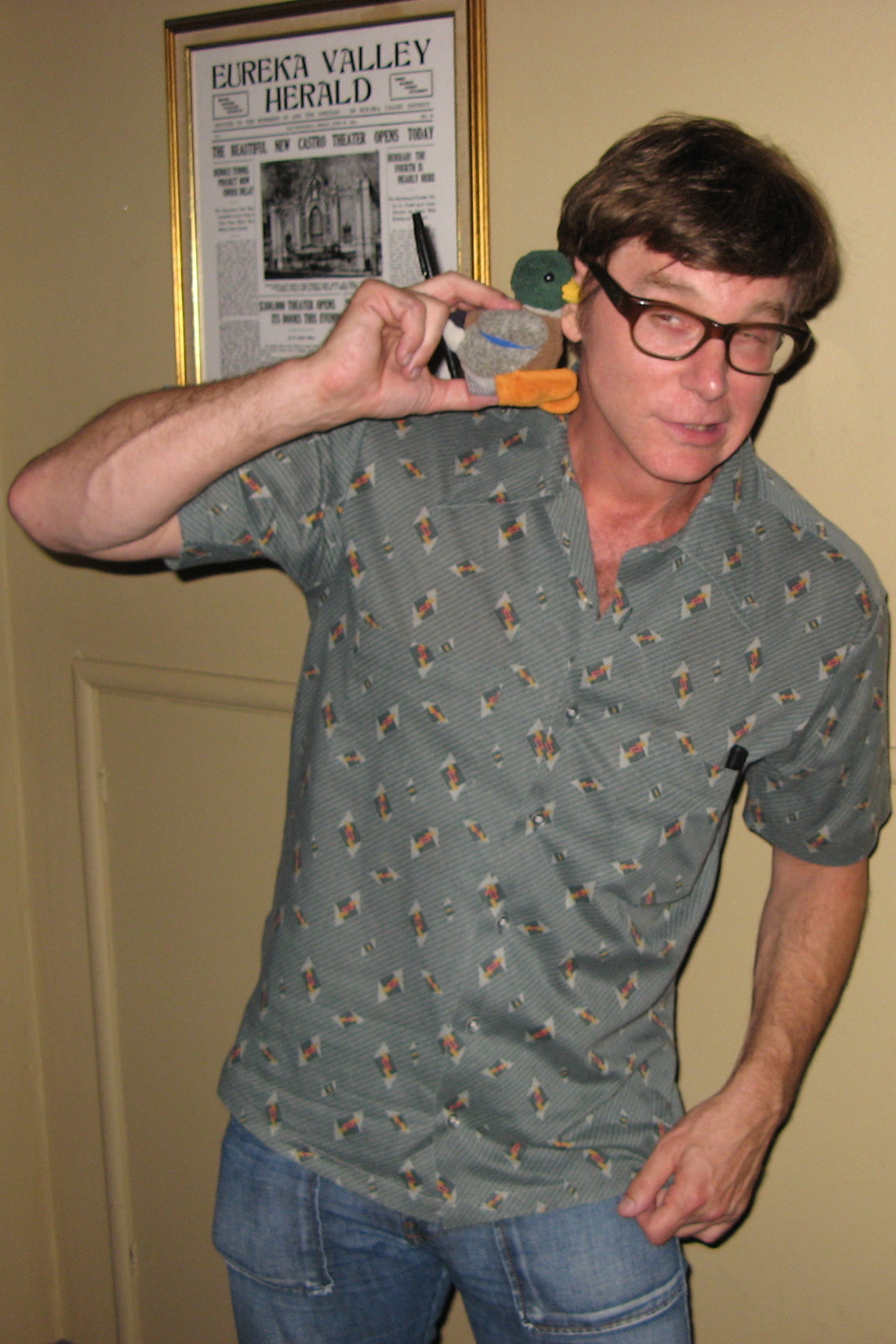
- Kricfalusi in 2006
- Born: Michael John Kricfalusi; September 9, 1955 (age 71); Chicoutimi, Quebec, Canada
- Other names: Raymond Spüm; John K.; Raymond S.
- Occupations: Animator, illustrator, voice actor, blogger
- Years active: 1979–2020 (animator); 2006–present (blogger)
- Known for: The Ren & Stimpy Show; The Goddamn George Liquor Program; The Ripping Friends
- Awards: Inkpot Award (2009)
- Website: johnkstuff.blogspot.com

Michael John Kricfalusi (/ˌkrɪsfəˈluːsi/ KRIS-fə-LOO-see; born September 9, 1955), known professionally as John K., is a Canadian illustrator, blogger, retired animator and voice actor. He is the creator of the animated television series The Ren & Stimpy Show, which was highly influential on televised animation during the 1990s. From 1989 to 1992, he was heavily involved with the first two seasons of the show in virtually every aspect of its production, including providing the voice of Ren Höek and other characters. In 2009, he won the Inkpot Award.

Born in Quebec, Kricfalusi spent his early childhood in Germany and Belgium before returning to Canada at age seven. He acquired his skills largely by copying cartoons from newspapers and comic books as a child, and by studying cartoons and their production systems from the 1940s and 1950s, with his main influence being Bob Clampett. After moving to Los Angeles in 1978, he collaborated with Ralph Bakshi and worked for Filmation, Hanna-Barbera, and DIC Entertainment on various shows. In 1989, Kricfalusi co-founded the animation studio Spümcø, with which he remained until its dissolution in 2005.

Nickelodeon fired Kricfalusi from Ren & Stimpy due to creative differences and his failure to meet production deadlines; the show continued for three additional seasons without his involvement. Following this, he directed and produced animated television commercials and music videos for entertainers such as Björk and Tenacious D. In the late 1990s, he created the first cartoons made exclusively for the Internet: The Goddamn George Liquor Program and Weekend Pussy Hunt. He returned to television with The Ripping Friends and the adult animation spin-off Ren & Stimpy "Adult Party Cartoon". Since 2006, Kricfalusi has maintained a personal blog dedicated to cartoons, animation, and art tips. There, he popularized the term "CalArts style", a pejorative which was later used by others to criticize a perceived widespread 2010s cartoon aesthetic, though he originally used it to refer to a completely different art style.

In 2018, Kricfalusi was accused by two former Spümcø artists of grooming and sexually abusing them in the late 1990s, when they were teenagers. Kricfalusi released an apology for his behavior, blaming his mental health and "poor impulse control". He has since declared his withdrawal from the professional animation industry.

== Early life and education ==
Michael John Kricfalusi was born on September 9, 1955, in Chicoutimi, Quebec, Canada to Michael Kricfalusi, who was of Ukrainian descent, and Mary Lou Kricfalusi (née MacDonell), who was of Scottish and English descent. He has one sister named Elizabeth. He spent his early childhood in Germany and Belgium while his father was serving in the Royal Canadian Air Force. He would watch weekend screenings of European feature-length cartoons such as The Snow Queen at Air Force cinemas. At age seven he returned with his family to Canada. After their return they moved from Montreal to Ottawa in the middle of a school season, and Kricfalusi spent much of his time that year at home, watching Hanna-Barbera cartoons and drawing them. Kricfalusi's interest in golden-age animation crystallized during his stay at Sheridan College, where he attended weekly screenings of old films and cartoons at Innis College held by film archivist Reg Hartt, among them the cartoons of Bob Clampett and Tex Avery, which left a deep impression on Kricfalusi. After he was expelled from Sheridan College at the end of 1978, Kricfalusi moved to Los Angeles, California, intending to become an animator.

== Career ==
=== Entering the animation industry ===
After moving to Los Angeles, Kricfalusi was introduced to Milt Gray by Bob Clampett, suggesting he should join Gray's classical animation class. Gray was working for Filmation at the time, and soon Kricfalusi found work there as well, getting his start on the shows Fat Albert and the Cosby Kids, The New Adventures of Mighty Mouse and Heckle & Jeckle, The New Adventures of Flash Gordon, The Tom and Jerry Comedy Show, and Gilligan's Planet. His first independent cartoon was a short called Ted Bakes One, which he produced with Bill Wray in 1981 for a cable channel. From 1979 to the mid-1980s, Kricfalusi worked for Filmation on the aforementioned shows and He-Man and the Masters of the Universe, and later Hanna-Barbera on Super Friends, Trollkins, Richie Rich, The Little Rascals, Mork & Mindy/Laverne & Shirley/Fonz Hour, Pac-Man, The Gary Coleman Show, Snorks, The Smurfs, The Jetsons and The Flintstone Kids, and DIC Entertainment on Heathcliff; he once described these shows as "the worst animation of all time". However, he did enjoy his work as a layout artist on the 1985 series of The Jetsons as he was able to train a team of Taiwanese animators at Cuckoo's Nest Studio to draw characters more emotive and wild, which at the time was considered radical. He recalls being "saved" from having to work on these cartoons by director Ralph Bakshi, who had worked with him before in 1980 and 1982. They began working on the designs for the film Bobby's Girl, which was sold to TriStar Pictures but was later cancelled. Under Bakshi, Kricfalusi directed the animation for The Rolling Stones' 1986 music video "Harlem Shuffle". In 1981, Kricfalusi applied to work on The Looney Looney Looney Bugs Bunny Movie. Virgil Ross liked his drawings, but Friz Freleng rejected the application, feeling that Kricfalusi's Bob Clampett-inspired style did not fit the film. Angered, Kricfalusi wrote post-it notes criticizing Freleng, pasting them on one of his cels from 1991, "The Squirt".

=== Mighty Mouse ===
The team's most successful project was Mighty Mouse: The New Adventures for CBS, based on the classic Terrytoons character. The series was well-received, and it is considered the forerunner of creator-driven cartoons. Kricfalusi directed eight of the twenty-six episodes and supervised the series. At the beginning of the second season, Kricfalusi left the show. The production of Mighty Mouse was very different from other cartoons at the time, gaining creative and artistic leeway thanks to the success of the irreverent Pee-wee's Playhouse on CBS a year before. The animators had much more creative input, driven by Kricfalusi's production system that emphasizes artistic contribution in every step of the process, from outline to storyboard to layout to the animation. Kricfalusi noted that working for Bakshi was challenging because he set high expectations for his crew. He described Bakshi as an intimidating presence who motivated staff to please him. During production, Bakshi reportedly rejected about two-thirds of story pitches presented to him.

Mighty Mouse was cancelled amidst controversy for allegedly depicting the main character snorting cocaine in the episode "The Littlest Tramp". Bakshi maintained that neither he nor Kricfalusi had the character sniffing cocaine, and that the character was sniffing the crushed petals of a flower, which were handed to him in a previous scene in the cartoon. He expressed disappointment with Kricfalusi's work, criticizing him for attempting to slip inappropriate or "cool" material into the series. In 1994, Kricfalusi pitched a revival series of Mighty Mouse to Paramount, which would have featured other Terrytoons characters such as Deputy Dawg, but they rejected the idea.

=== Beany and Cecil ===
Kricfalusi left Bakshi's studio to work on The New Adventures of Beany and Cecil for ABC, where he teamed up with many of the people who would later work with him on many of his Spümcø projects. ABC had been negotiating for the production of the show with the Clampett family, who insisted that Kricfalusi be part of the production as he was a strong proponent of Bob Clampett's cartoon style. The long negotiations delayed the start of production to mid-July, causing much of the animation to be rushed in order to meet the September deadline. Tensions rose between Kricfalusi and ABC over the tone of the show, leading to an uncomfortable atmosphere for the show's crew. The more ABC strove to soften the show, the more Kricfalusi pushed for shocking and offensive material. While ultimately dissatisfied with the cartoon, the Clampett family remained supportive of Kricfalusi's creative direction. ABC canceled the show after six episodes, finding the humor not suitable for children's programming.

=== Ren & Stimpy ===
Kricfalusi formed Spümcø animation studio with partners Jim Smith, Bob Camp and Lynne Naylor. They began working on a pilot for The Ren & Stimpy Show on behalf of Nickelodeon, after the eponymous characters were favored by Nickelodeon producer Vanessa Coffey in a presentation by Kricfalusi. The show came to garner high ratings for Nickelodeon, and at the time was the most popular cable TV show in the United States, but the network disagreed with Kricfalusi's direction of the show, and disapproved of his missed production deadlines. Kricfalusi points specifically to the episode "Man's Best Friend", which depicts the character George Liquor as an abusive father figure, as the turning point in his relationship with Nickelodeon. One of the episodes, "Nurse Stimpy", did not meet Kricfalusi's approval because of the low quality of the rough cut of the episode that they received from the overseas studio, leading him to use the alias Raymond Spum in its credits. Nickelodeon terminated Kricfalusi's contract late September 1992, leaving it to Nickelodeon's Games Animation studio, which continued producing it for three more seasons before its cancellation.

=== The Ripping Friends ===
Fox Kids started airing the television series The Ripping Friends in 2001, created by Kricfalusi and Jim Smith. Kricfalusi had previously tried pitching the show in the late 1980s, but networks considered it "too extreme" so did not pick it up. Kricfalusi felt the show's supervisors were doing away with the Spümcø style and was displeased with the direction of the show. He considers the episodes he was involved in to be experimental. One of his contributions to the show was directing the voice-actors, which he "really worked-out" so much that he was afraid he'd give one of them, Harvey Atkin, a heart attack.

=== Ren and Stimpy "Adult Party Cartoon" ===
In 2003, Spike TV produced a new show featuring Ren & Stimpy, which was written and directed by Kricfalusi. The first three episodes were based on fan ideas and scripts that were rejected by Nickelodeon during the original show's run. According to Kricfalusi, Spike pushed for more South Park-like themes in the new show. While he was initially pleased with the added freedom afforded to him by Spike, he later expressed disappointment in the series due to its slow pacing and overuse of toilet humor. Only three episodes aired before Spike's entire animation block was "put on hold", and the complete series was ultimately released in 2006 on DVD including three additional episodes that never aired. Kricfalusi also wanted to release an episode titled "Life Sucks" straight to DVD, but the episode remains unproduced.

=== Other projects ===
==== Collaborations with Fred Seibert ====
After leaving The Ren & Stimpy Show, Kricfalusi consulted, and other Spümcø animators worked for Donovan Cook's 2 Stupid Dogs, which was put into production by Hanna-Barbera president Fred Seibert. The cartoon's credits read "Tidbits of Poor Taste Supplied by John Kricfalusi" for the three "Little Red Riding Hood" episodes: "Red", "Red Strikes Back", and "Return of Red". In 1994, Hanna-Barbera and Seibert started production on What a Cartoon!, also known as World Premiere Toons for Cartoon Network. Seibert approached Kricfalusi for advice and for recommendations for personnel to head the shorts, among them David Feiss, Tom Minton, Pat Ventura, and Eddie Fitzgerald.

==== Music videos ====
Kricfalusi directed Icelandic singer Björk's animated music video for the song "I Miss You" in 1997, which features Björk and the character Jimmy the Idiot Boy. Jack Black of Tenacious D approached Kricfalusi to produce a music video for the song "Fuck Her Gently" from their debut album, released in 2001. Black browsed Kricfalusi's website and, since both he and his bandmate Kyle Gass held Ren & Stimpy in high regard, he asked Kricfalusi to produce the video. The costs amounted to $40,000. Initially, Sony Music did not allow the video to be placed on Tenacious D's website and instead placed it on the record label Grand Royal's website, but later relented. In 2006, Kricfalusi directed two music videos, and served as art director for an animated musical segment. The first music video, for Close but No Cigar by "Weird Al" Yankovic, was released in September, on the DVD side of the DualDisc album Straight Outta Lynwood, which features Kricfalusi's character Cigarettes the Cat. The second music video was for Classico by Tenacious D, starring the band members as cartoon characters. He re-animated the characters in a THX logo parody for the band's feature film, The Pick of Destiny. Kricfalusi served as art director for a musical segment in the show Class of 3000 entitled Life Without Music, which first aired on November 3, 2006. In 2014, he produced art for Miley Cyrus' Bangerz Tour.

==== Internet cartoons and Hanna-Barbera shorts ====
Venturing into Internet cartoons, Kricfalusi created Weekend Pussy Hunt in 1996 for MSN, which was billed as "the world's first interactive web-based cartoon". The cartoon, which was released in segments, was scheduled to be completed in June 1997, but production under MSN stopped before it was finished. Production later resumed under Icebox.com after the release of Spümcø's own web-based Flash cartoon, The Goddamn George Liquor Program. Between 1998 and 2001, Kricfalusi worked on several Hanna-Barbera cartoons for Cartoon Network: three Yogi Bear parody cartoons he directed and animated, Boo Boo Runs Wild, A Day in the Life of Ranger Smith and Boo Boo and the Man, and two Jetsons parody cartoons he produced, The Jetsons: Father & Son Day and The Jetsons: The Best Son.

==== Cartoon commentaries, magazines, and other media ====
Kricfalusi contributed several articles in 1993 and 1994 for the magazines Film Threat and Wild Cartoon Kingdom under various aliases. Kricfalusi appears in several bonus featurettes and provides audio commentaries for the Looney Tunes Golden Collection volumes 2, 3 and 5, for cartoons directed by Bob Clampett and Chuck Jones. On February 13, 2006, Kricfalusi started his own weblog, John K Stuff, posting about cartoons and the animation industry. The site was originally intended for other artists and entertainers, and specifically other cartoonists.

==== Commercials and freelance work ====
Kricfalusi directed commercials for Comcast and Voice over IP company Raketu in 2007. He was developing a series of cartoon commercials in 2008 for Pontiac Vibe starring George Liquor and Jimmy The Idiot Boy, but the series remained unreleased after General Motors discontinued the Pontiac Vibe auto line in 2009. He developed and animated a series of bumpers using Toon Boom Harmony for Adult Swim in 2011 and again in 2015. He animated the opening couch gags of two episodes of The Simpsons, "Bart Stops to Smell the Roosevelts", which aired in October 2011 and "Treehouse of Horror XXVI", which aired in October 2015. He collaborated with streetwear brand Stüssy to create a short series of apparel based on his designs in 2012, which he promoted with a commercial featuring some of his characters.

The advertising agency Muhtayzik-Hoffer hired Kricfalusi in 2013 for an ad campaign for F'real milkshakes. He was involved in the early development of many Reel FX projects such as the 2013 film Free Birds, a pitch for a film adaptation of the Dr. Seuss book Happy Birthday to You! and a pitch for a film he created with Jim Smith. He posted the concepts for these projects on his blog. He partnered with animator Mike Judge to produce a series of shorts for UFC that aired on Adult Swim throughout 2016.

==== Cans Without Labels ====
The cartoon short.

In 2012, Kricfalusi funded through Kickstarter a cartoon short entitled Cans Without Labels, starring the character George Liquor (with Michael Pataki reprising the role for the final time before his death in 2010, having recorded his lines beforehand), with the initial delivery date of February 2013. The cartoon was due to be screened at the 2016 Annecy International Animated Film Festival for the first time; however, at the last minute it was announced that it was not ready. However, on August 6, 2017, the Kickstarter was updated, announcing the film's completion. On May 27, 2019, Kricfalusi announced the DVD masterings' completion and released it on his MyShopify store within a week or two, with backers receiving first priority.

=== Retirement ===
In the 2020 documentary Happy Happy Joy Joy: The Ren and Stimpy Story, Kricfalusi stated in an interview that he was "officially retired" from the animation industry, "though not by choice".

== Influences ==
Kricfalusi says he is mostly self-taught, having only spent a year in Sheridan College, barely attending class. He acquired his skills largely by copying cartoons from newspapers and comic books as a child, and by studying cartoons and their production systems from the 1940s and 1950s.

His main influence is Bob Clampett, though he has also cited Chuck Jones, Frank Sinatra, Kirk Douglas, Milt Gross, Tex Avery, Peter Lorre, The Three Stooges, Al Jolson, Bing Crosby, Dean Martin, Elvis Presley, Don Martin, and Robert Ryan as lesser inspirations.

Michael Barrier, an animation historian, said that Kricfalusi's works "testify to his intense admiration for Bob Clampett's Warner Bros. cartoons" and that no cartoonist since Clampett created cartoons in which the emotions of the characters "distort their bodies so powerfully".

== Sexual abuse allegations ==
In March 2018, former Spümcø employees Robyn Byrd and Katie Rice told BuzzFeed News that Kricfalusi sexually harassed and groomed them while they were underage. Byrd told the website that she was in a sexual relationship with Kricfalusi in 1997 at age 16 and flew to California to live with him when she was 17. Rice said that Kricfalusi had flirted with her and made overt sexual comments towards her starting when she was 14 and sexually harassed her when she turned 18 and began working at his animation studio, Spümcø.

Documents Rice and Byrd had saved from those years corroborate their stories, and several people who worked with Kricfalusi referred to his sexual harassment as an open secret in the animation industry. Kricfalusi was also reported to possess child pornography on his computer. Though the allegations were eventually reported to the police, they could neither arrest nor investigate Kricfalusi because the statute of limitations had passed.

In response, Kricfalusi's lawyer confirmed that "for a brief time, 25 years ago, he had a 16-year-old girlfriend", but denied that Kricfalusi's "avid pursuit" of Rice was sexual harassment or that he had ever possessed child pornography. Kricfalusi admitted to the abuse in a statement in which he apologized to the women and his fans for his behavior, which he said was motivated by then-undiagnosed bipolar disorder and attention deficit hyperactivity disorder (ADHD), as well as "poor impulse control". Byrd and Rice criticized Kricfalusi's statement as a non-apology and an attempt to deflect the blame.

Due to the allegations, Kricfalusi would not be involved in Comedy Central's unreleased revival of The Ren & Stimpy Show, nor would he receive any financial compensation from it.

== Filmography ==
=== Film ===
Year	Title	Director	Producer	Writer	Animation department	Notes
1981	Ted Bakes One	Yes	Yes	Yes	Yes	Short film; Animator
1982	Mighty Mouse in the Great Space Chase	No	No	No	Yes	Feature film; Storyboard artist
1988	The Thing What Lurked in the Tub	No	No	No	Yes	Short film; Character colour key assistant; Background colour key assistant
1989	Troop Beverly Hills	No	No	No	Yes	Feature film; Animator and layout artist: Opening titles
2006	Tenacious D in The Pick of Destiny	No	No	No	Yes	Feature film; Animator: THX logo sequence
2009	Al's Brain	No	No	No	Yes	Short film; Character designer
2020	Happy Happy Joy Joy: The Ren and Stimpy Story	No	No	No	No	Documentary; Himself
2020	Utopia Means Nowhere	No	No	No	Yes	Documentary; Animator and design: Opening titles

=== Television ===
Year	Title	Director	Producer	Writer	Animation department	Voice actor/actor	Role	Notes
1979	Fat Albert and the Cosby Kids	No	No	No	Yes	No		Storyboard artist
1979	The New Adventures of Mighty Mouse and Heckle and Jeckle	No	No	No	Yes	No		Storyboard artist
1979	The New Adventures of Flash Gordon	No	No	No	Yes	No		Storyboard artist
1980	The Tom and Jerry Comedy Show	No	No	No	Yes	No		Layout artist
1981	Super Friends	No	No	No	Yes	No		Layout artist
1981	Trollkins	No	No	No	Yes	No		Layout artist
1982	Mork & Mindy/Laverne & Shirley/Fonz Hour	No	No	No	Yes	No		Layout artist
1982	Pac-Man	No	No	No	Yes	No		Layout artist
1984	Heathcliff	No	No	No	Yes	No		Character designer
1984	Snorks	No	No	No	Yes	No		Layout artist
1984	The Smurfs	No	No	No	Yes	No		Character designer
1985	The Jetsons	No	No	No	Yes	No		Layout artist; Layout supervisor
1986	Galaxy High School	No	No	No	Yes	No		Graphics designer
1987	Mighty Mouse: The New Adventures	Yes	No	Yes	Yes	No		Senior director; Layout artist
1988	The New Adventures of Beany and Cecil	Yes	Yes	No	Yes	No		Creator; Character designer
1990	Tiny Toon Adventures	No	No	No	Yes	No		Model designer; Episode: "Who Bopped Bugs Bunny?"
1991–1993	The Ren & Stimpy Show	Yes	Yes	Yes	Yes	Yes	Ren Höek, Mr. Horse, additional voices	Creator; Character designer; Storyboard artist; Animation director
1993	2 Stupid Dogs	No	No	No	Yes	No		Consultant only
1999	He-Hog the Atomic Pig	Yes	Yes	Yes	Yes	Yes	Professor Mole	Pilot; creator; Concept artist; Storyboard artist; Animator
1999	Boo Boo Runs Wild	Yes	Yes	Yes	Yes	Yes	Boo-Boo Bear, Tree	Television short; Character designer; Layout artist; Animator; Recording director; Music editor
1999	A Day in the Life of Ranger Smith	Yes	Yes	Yes	Yes	Yes	Boo-Boo Bear, Squirrel Boy	Television short; Character designer; Layout artist; Animator; Recording director; Music editor
2001–2002	The Ripping Friends	Yes	Yes	Yes	Yes	Yes	Citracett, Jimmy the Idiot Boy, additional voices	Creator; Character designer; Storyboard artist; Key animator; Voice director
2001	The Jetsons: Father & Son Day	No	Yes	Yes	Yes	No		Television short; Outlines
2002	The Jetsons: The Best Son	No	Yes	Yes	Yes	No		Television short; Layout artist
2002	Boo Boo and the Man	Yes	Yes	Yes	Yes	Yes	Boo-Boo Bear	Television short; Story; Character designer; Layout artist; Animator; Recording director; Music editor
2003, 2006	Ren & Stimpy "Adult Party Cartoon"	Yes	Yes	Yes	Yes	Yes	Ren Höek, additional voices	Creator; Original character designer; Storyboard artist; Animation director
2006	The X's	No	No	No	No	Yes	Bowling Alley Guy	Guest voice actor Episode: "Pinheads"
2006	Class of 3000	No	No	No	Yes	No		Guest art director; Episode: "Home"
2011, 2015	The Simpsons	No	No	No	Yes	No		Guest animator; Episodes: "Bart Stops to Smell the Roosevelts"; "Treehouse of Horror XXVI"
2012	The Eric André Show	No	No	No	No	Yes	Himself	Guest, episode: "The Eric André New Year's Eve Spooktacular"

=== Online ===
Year	Title	Director	Producer	Writer	Animation department	Voice actor	Role	Notes
1997	The Goddamn George Liquor Program	Yes	Yes	Yes	Yes	Yes	Jimmy the Idiot Boy	Web series; Also creator
1998	What Pee Boners Are For	Yes	Yes	Yes	Yes	No		Web short
1998	A George Liquor Christmas	Yes	Yes	Yes	Yes	No		Web short
1999	Rice Patooties	Yes	Yes	Yes	Yes	No		Web short
1999–2000	Weekend Pussy Hunt	Yes	Yes	Yes	No	Yes	Dirty Dog	Unfinished web series; Also creator
2019	Cans Without Labels	Yes	Yes	Yes	Yes	Yes	George Liquor (additional dialogue) (Note: Kricfalusi stood in as a voice double for the character in certain scenes due to Michael Pataki's death in 2010.)	Web short; Animator and background painter

=== Music video ===
Year	Title	Director	Producer	Animation department	Notes
1986	"Harlem Shuffle" by The Rolling Stones	Yes	Yes	Yes	Animation segment only
1997	"I Miss You" by Björk	Yes	Yes	Yes	
2001	"Fuck Her Gently" by Tenacious D	No	Yes	No	
2006	"Close but No Cigar" by "Weird Al" Yankovic	Yes	Yes	Yes	
2006	"Classico" by Tenacious D	Yes	Yes	Yes	
2013	"SMS (Bangerz)" by Miley Cyrus	Yes	Yes	Yes	

=== Commercials ===
Year	Title	Client(s)
1993	"John K. Peacock Logo 1"; "John K. Peacock Logo 2"	NBC
1996	"Jimmy and Sody Pop"	Aoki's Pizza
1996	"You Want Some?"	Barq's Root Beer
1997	"Big Bad Wolf"	Nike
1997	"Rooster"	Village Pantry
1998	"Cadbury Land"	Cadbury
1998	"Boys Big Pockets"; "Boys Hooded Fleece"; "Girls Flare Jeans"; "Girls Curly Fleece"	Old Navy
1999	"Treat Your Dog Right"	Wagwells Dog Treats
2007	"George Liquor"; "Sody Pop"; "Mobile"; "Bobby Bigloaf"	Raketu
2007	"Triple-Saurus"	Comcast
2011	"Critters Fence"; "Furries"; "Rubber Hose Anime"; "UPA Kids 1"; "UPA Kids 2"	Adult Swim
2012	"Bobby Bigloaf"	Stüssy
2014	"Chocolate Milkshake"; "Fencing"	F'real
2015	"Turtle Shell"; "Basement"; "Walrus"; "Funny Animals Running"	Adult Swim
2016	"Hank Hill and George Liquor"; "Diaz vs McGregor 2"	Ultimate Fighting Championship

=== Video games ===
Year	Title	Notes
2001	Yoake no Mariko	Producer
2003	Go! Go! Hypergrind	Producer

== Bibliography ==
Year	Title	Notes
1995, 1997	Spümcø Comic Book	4 issues

== Accolades ==
Year	Award	Category	Title	Result
1992	Annie Award	Outstanding Individual Achievement in the Field of Animation	The Ren & Stimpy Show	Won
1992	Primetime Emmy Award	Outstanding Animated Program (For Programming One Hour or Less); Shared with Bob Camp, Vanessa Coffey, Christine Danzo, Mary Harrington, Bob Jaques, Mitchell Kriegman and Will McRobb	The Ren & Stimpy Show	Nominated
1993	CableACE Award	Animated Programming Special or Series; Shared with Bob Camp, Vanessa Coffey, Christine Danzo, Mary Harrington, Mitchell Kriegman, Will McRobb and Vincent Waller	The Ren & Stimpy Show	Nominated
1993	Primetime Emmy Award	Outstanding Animated Program (For Programming One Hour or Less); Shared with Jim Ballantine, Bob Camp, Vanessa Coffey, Mary Harrington, Bob Jaques, Richard Pursel, Frank Saperstein, Libby Simon and Roy Allen Smith	The Ren & Stimpy Show	Nominated
1994	CableACE Award	Animated Programming Special or Series; Shared with Peter Avanzino, Bob Camp, Vanessa Coffey, Christine Danzo, Jim Gomez, Mary Harrington, Ron Hughart, Mitchell Kriegman, April March, Will McRobb, Chris Reccardi, Frank Saperstein, Jim Shaw, Roy Allen Smith, Gregg Vanzo and Vincent Waller	The Ren & Stimpy Show	Nominated
2008	Annie Award	Winsor McCay Award		Won
