= George Liquor =

Cartoon character

- The Ren & Stimpy Show & The Goddamn George Liquor Program character
- George Liquor from The Ren & Stimpy Show
- First appearance: "Robin Höek" (1991)
- Last appearance: "Cans Without Labels" (2019)
- Created by: John Kricfalusi
- Based on: Mike Kricfalusi
- Voiced by: Harris Peet (1991); Michael Pataki (1992–2010, 2019); John Kricfalusi (2010–2019)

In-universe information
- Species: Human
- Gender: Male
- Family: Jimmy the Idiot Boy (nephew); Slab (nephew); Ernie (nephew); Frank Liquor (brother); Mildrew Liquor (sister-in-law)
- Spouses: Mable Liquor (wife; deceased)
- Religion: Christianity
- Nationality: American

George Liquor (often taking his epithet as George Liquor, American) is a cartoon character created by John Kricfalusi. Liquor is most famous for his appearances on The Ren & Stimpy Show. He is considered Kricfalusi's signature character and was a mascot for Kricfalusi's defunct animation studio, Spümcø. Kricfalusi portrayed George Liquor as a patriotic, outspoken, politically conservative blowhard. Kricfalusi described Liquor as his favorite character to animate.

George Liquor was voiced by Harris Peet in his first starring episode of The Ren & Stimpy Show. Liquor was voiced by Michael Pataki until the latter's death in 2010 with his last voice work for the character posthumously featured in Cans Without Labels. Kricfalusi has voiced the character himself subsequently. George Liquor appeared in episodes of The Ren & Stimpy Show, the episodes of The Goddamn George Liquor Program, comic books, webcomics, internet cartoons, and advertisements. According to Kricfalusi's blog, a new webtoon starring George was in development and to be sponsored by Pontiac Vibe, but the series remained unreleased when the Pontiac Vibe was discontinued in 2009.

== Personality ==
Kricfalusi described George Liquor as "the greatest American" who is so conservative "that he thinks the Republicans are commies". George harbors a deep antipathy for the political left; in one issue of Spümcø's Comic Book, George Liquor becomes enraged after a fish calls him a Democrat. According to Kricfalusi's "George Liquor Story Bible", George is a middle-aged, crass, religious, ultra-patriotic American who favors his nephew, Jimmy the Idiot Boy, and tries to teach Jimmy how to be a "real man". George has a hillbilly relative, Corn Liquor, who was intended to be introduced in an episode in the second season named "Hillbilly Ren", but never got past the outline stage before Kricfalusi was fired.

Liquor lives in the fictional city of Decentville, USA. George strongly believes in discipline and corporal punishment; his motto is "it's discipline that begets love". In the two episodes of The Ren & Stimpy Show in which he starred, George treats Ren and Stimpy strictly and tries to make them as disciplined as possible; despite this, he genuinely cares for the duo, though his abuse occurs unintentionally under his misguided actions. In an issue of Comic Book, Liquor questions how parents can love their children without spanking them.

== Creation ==
George was created by Kricfalusi in 1979 immediately after Kricfalusi saw a building with a sign that read "George Liquor". Kricfalusi said that the name "George Liquor" was "the coolest name [he] ever heard". According to Kricfalusi's blog, Kricfalusi's father greatly influenced the character's personality. He said that both Liquor and his father are similar in that "George and my Dad believe strongly in discipline and order and rules. (Especially their own!)" Kricfalusi intended for George Liquor to be an integral character in The Ren & Stimpy Show; Kricfalusi created Ren and Stimpy as Liquor's and Jimmy's pets.

== On The Ren & Stimpy Show ==
George Liquor's first official appearances were in episodes of The Ren & Stimpy Show, a cartoon series that Kricfalusi created, sold to the television channel Nickelodeon, and directed at his studio Spümcø. Liquor starred in the episodes "Dog Show" and "Man's Best Friend", and made brief cameos in the episodes "The Boy Who Cried Rat!" and "Robin Höek". According to Kricfalusi, Liquor only appeared in a few episodes because those in charge of Nickelodeon at the time hated the character. Ren & Stimpy animator Bill Wray described Liquor as a character that Nickelodeon "never liked" because the name "Liquor" both was a reference to alcohol and sounded like the words "lick her". Wray said that Nickelodeon disapproved of George but did not forbid Kricfalusi from using the character.

In one of Liquor's starring roles, in the episode "Dog Show", George put characters Ren and Stimpy through a painful process of making the two into perfect pets for a dog show. Before the episode was broadcast, it was censored so that George's last name, "Liquor", was cut from the soundtrack. According to Forbidden Animation: Censored Cartoons and Blacklisted Animators in America, Nickelodeon has not officially explained why the name "Liquor" was cut from broadcasting. Liquor's other major appearance, the episode "Man's Best Friend", was banned from Nickelodeon and was not shown on television for years because of its content. In the episode, George makes threats and angry demands to Ren and Stimpy, and in the end of the episode, Ren beats George with an oar. In addition to missing deadlines for Nickelodeon and making too many controversial cartoons, Kricfalusi said that the episode "Man's Best Friend" was the episode of The Ren & Stimpy Show that got him and the Spümcø staff fired from the series. Kricfalusi said that "Man's Best Friend" was actually approved for broadcasting by both Standards and Practices and Nickelodeon administrators, but the Nickelodeon staff declined to broadcast the episode when network executives saw the finished product. Wray stated that the episode was "all finished and ready to go" before the cancellation. The episode aired on Spike TV in 2003 as part of Ren & Stimpy "Adult Party Cartoon". When Nickelodeon fired Kricfalusi, the network sold him the rights of the character because the network employees did not like the character; this would prove to be a problem as they could not air additional footage of "Man's Best Friend" produced by Games Animation in an attempt to make the episode more appropriate. The arrangement with the network also granted Kricfalusi the rights to Jimmy the Hapless Idiot Boy, used on the company's vanity card.

== In Comic Book ==
After Nickelodeon, George Liquor and Jimmy the Idiot Boy starred in Spümcø Comic Book, a Spümcø-produced comic book series. The comic book series also had appearances of the various characters who regularly interacted with George and Jimmy. The series was launched at Marvel Comics, but Kricfalusi decided to move the series to Dark Horse Comics, as "Marvel wanted to maintain its corporate image, so we moved to Dark Horse, where they have no social conscience". The series was written and drawn by Spümcø co-founders Kricfalusi and Jim Smith and other members of the original Spümcø staff. While with Marvel, Comic Book was nominated for an Eisner Award for Best Humor Publication. One story in the first issue of the Dark Horse's Comic Book, George Liquor's Fishing Show, was later made into a webcomic with sound that was featured on the Spümcø website.

== On The Goddamn George Liquor Program ==
George Liquor being used in Macromedia Flash in a commercial for Tower Records.

George Liquor starred in the Flash Internet cartoon series The Goddamn George Liquor Program, created by Kricfalusi. Premiering on October 15, 1997, The Goddamn George Liquor Program was the first cartoon series to be produced exclusively for the Internet. George appeared on the series with his nephew, Jimmy the Idiot Boy; Jimmy's cousins, Slab and Ernie; Jimmy's love interest, Sody Pop; and George and Jimmy's pet dog, Dirty Dog. Without the control of a network, the series could be made as Kricfalusi wanted. Spümcø produced eight one-minute shorts. In 1999, The Goddamn George Liquor Program won an Annie Award for "Outstanding Achievement in an Animated Interactive Production". The series spawned an online short called A George Liquor Christmas, also starring him, Jimmy and Pop.

== In advertisements ==
After being fired from The Ren & Stimpy Show, John Kricfalusi used George Liquor in Macromedia Flash advertisements in hopes of creating a series with direct sponsorship without a network. Kricfalusi began with free advertisements that he made for Tower Records in 1997. George Liquor has been used in Kricfalusi's advertisements for Barq's Root Beer, the Ultimate Fighting Championship, and the internet communication service Raketu. A series of cartoon commercials was developed by Kricfalusi in 2008 for Pontiac Vibe starring him, but the series remained unreleased after General Motors discontinued the Pontiac Vibe auto line in 2009.

George Liquor has consistently appeared in promos for Adult Swim during the final years of John Kricfalusi's career, as he had managed to secure a stable relationship with Williams Street, having worked for Hanna-Barbera in his early years and contributed specials to Cartoon Network. In 2016, George Liquor has appeared in promos airing on Adult Swim advertising upcoming UFC fights along with other characters such as Slab N' Ernie and Hank Hill.

== In Cans Without Labels ==
Cans Without Labels

George Liquor has a prominent role in the Kickstarter-crowdfunded short Cans Without Labels. Originally intended for release in February 2013, production of the short was delayed up until its completion on August 6, 2017 despite technical difficulties of the DVD mastering. On May 27, 2019, John Kricfalusi announced the DVD masterings' completion and it is currently available on his MyShopify store online on DVD, with backers receiving the DVD's first shipments. Based on Kricfalusi's childhood experience, the short details George purchasing unlabeled silver cans for a cheap price, and his attempts to feed them to his younger nephews, Slab and Ernie (voiced by Eric Bauza and Gabe Swarr). Despite believing that the can would contain beef stew, he opens it to find out that there was a face inside instead. In spite of Slab and Ernie's disgust, he still insists on feeding it to them. After some hesitation from the boys, George gives the two by the time he finishes using the bathroom to eat the entire face. Towards the end of the short, George appears with a belt, preparing to punish them, but notices the empty can (as a result of the two feeding the face to surprise guest Donald Bastard, a parody of Donald Duck) and congratulates them. To reward them, he offers to open another can, but Slab and Ernie run away at the last minute.

This short marked Michael Pataki's final role due to his death on April 15, 2010, with the short being dedicated to his memory. Because he was unable to complete his voice work before his death, Kricfalusi voiced the character for select scenes.

== Books and articles ==
- Komorowski, Thad (2017). Sick Little Monkeys: The Unauthorized Ren & Stimpy Story. Albany, Georgia: BearManor Media. ISBN 978-1629331836.
