= Vincent Waller =

American animator (born 1960)

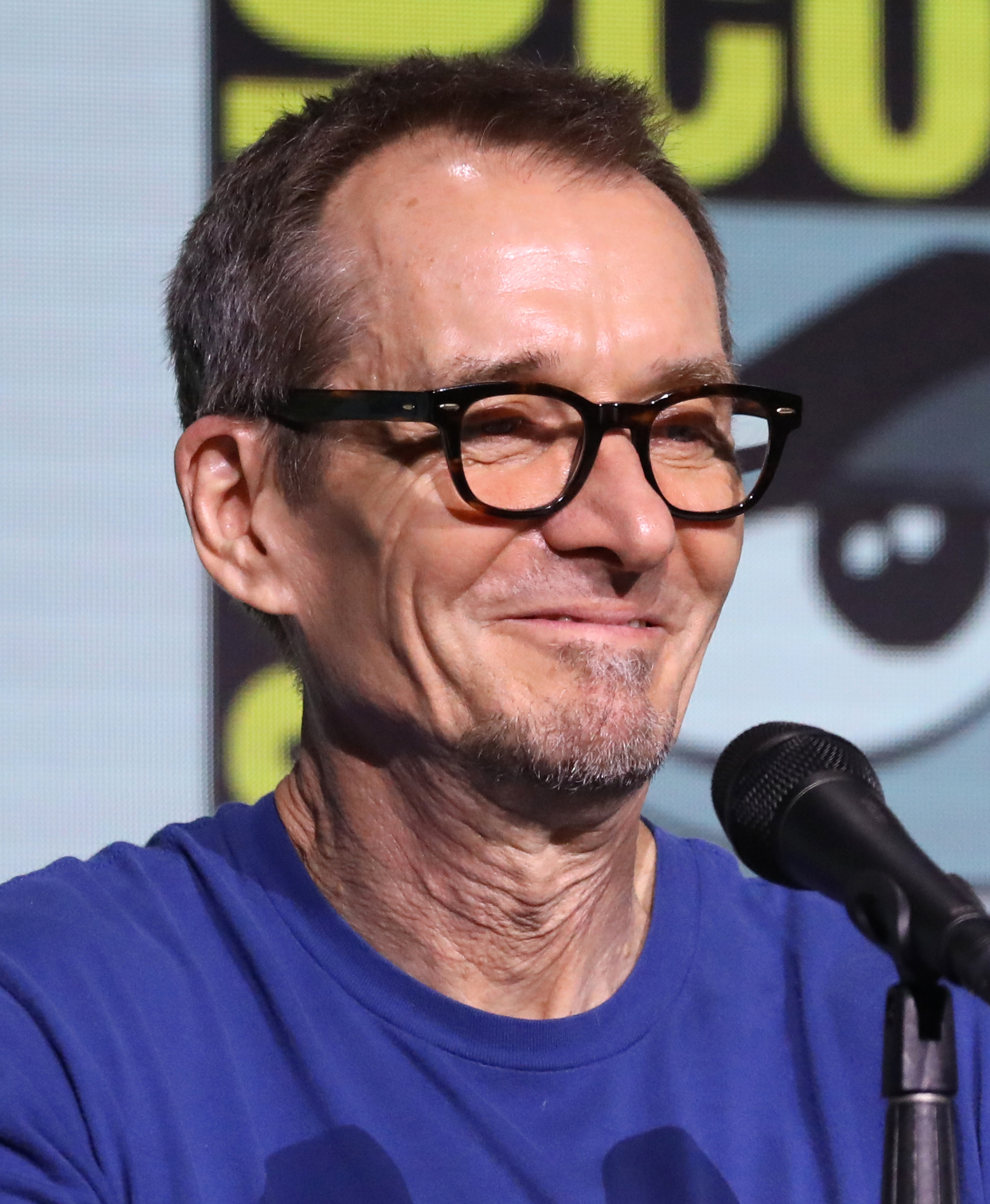
- Waller in 2024
- Born: Vincent Paul Waller; September 30, 1960 (age 66); Arlington, Texas, U.S.
- Occupations: Animator, storyboard artist, writer, technical director
- Years active: 1985–present
- Known for: The Ren & Stimpy Show; Nightmare Ned; The Grim Adventures of Billy & Mandy; SpongeBob SquarePants

Vincent Paul Waller (born September 30, 1960) is an American animator, storyboard artist, writer, and technical director. He has worked on several animated television shows and movies, the most notable of which being The Ren & Stimpy Show and SpongeBob SquarePants.

== Career ==
=== The Ren & Stimpy Show ===
Initially introduced to series creator John Kricfalusi via an acquaintanceship with Bob Camp, Waller was hired at Spümcø in 1990 to work on The Ren & Stimpy Show. A prominent storyboarder and layout artist during the series' first season, he was promoted to a director the following year and helmed "Rubber Nipple Salesmen" and "Big Baby Scam" for the second season before departing the show alongside Kricfalusi in 1992. Waller would continue to collaborate with Kricfalusi throughout the following decade, directing "Onward & Upward", the first episode of Ren and Stimpy's short-lived adult-oriented revival, in 2003.

=== Other shows ===
Waller produced and directed shorts for Fred Seibert's Oh Yeah! Cartoons. He co-created What Is Funny? (whose main character, Slap T. Pooch, later appeared in the logo of Nickelodeon Movies for the intro of The Rugrats Movie) with Bill Burnett, as well as Pete Patrick: Private Investigator and Let's Talk Turkey. He also adapted the Harvey Kurtzman comic Hey Look! into a pilot episode for the series.

=== SpongeBob SquarePants and other work ===
Despite refusing to be hired at Games Animation out of loyalty to Kricfalusi alongside Jim Smith and Richard Pursel, Waller would later be hired to the studio, albeit much later than his peers and after it had rebranded as Nickelodeon Animation Studio. He served as a writer for animated television series SpongeBob SquarePants during the last half of the series' first season, leaving after the first season was completed. Waller returned to the series as technical director for the series' fourth season, and supervised the first season of Harvey Birdman, Attorney at Law. He worked on The Oblongs as a director, and later as re-take director. He was also a writer and storyboard artist on Cartoon Network's The Grim Adventures of Billy & Mandy and Evil Con Carne. Towards the end of the fourth season, Waller was promoted to creative director of SpongeBob, succeeding Derek Drymon. In 2015, Waller was promoted to supervising producer and showrunner along with Marc Ceccarelli, succeeding Paul Tibbitt. This resulted in the retirement of the creative director position.

Waller served as the creative supervisor for The SpongeBob Movie: Sponge Out of Water. He also serves as co-executive producer and showrunner of the SpongeBob prequel series, Kamp Koral.

He briefly served as a director alongside Bill Kopp for an unfinished Austin Powers animated series.

He had also briefly worked at Marvel Comics as an inker and penciller for comics including Savage Tales, The Savage Sword of Conan and Mark Hazzard: Merc.

== Filmography ==
=== Television series ===
Year	Title	Notes
1988–1990	The Real Ghostbusters	storyboard clean-up storyboard artist
1990	New Kids on the Block	storyboard artist
1990	Gravedale High	storyboard artist
1990	Attack of the Killer Tomatoes	storyboard director
1990–1991	Captain Planet and the Planeteers	storyboard director
1991–1993	The Ren & Stimpy Show	writer storyboard artist story director (1992–1993) character designer layout supervisor
1993	Adventures of Sonic the Hedgehog	storyboard artist
1993	2 Stupid Dogs	animation director
1994	The Baby Huey Show	writer storyboard artist
1994	The Tick	storyboard artist
1995	What-a-Mess	storyboard artist
1995	Earthworm Jim	storyboard artist
1996–1997	Duckman	storyboard artist
1997	Nightmare Ned	writer (episode "The Dentist") storyboard artist
1997	Happily Ever After: Fairy Tales for Every Child	overseas animation director
1998	I Am Weasel	storyboard artist (episode "I Am Crybaby")
1998	Cow and Chicken	storyboard artist (episode "Buffalo Gals")
1998	Oh Yeah! Cartoons	writer producer director Voice actor
1999–2000, 2005–present	SpongeBob SquarePants	writer (1999-2000; 2005; 2011–2012) storyboard artist (2000) storyboard director (2005; 2011–2012) creative director (2005–2015) showrunner (2015–present) supervising producer (2015–2018); Voice actor co-executive producer (2018–2022) executive producer (2022–present)
2001–2002	The Oblongs	retake director (2001) director
2001–2002	Harvey Birdman, Attorney at Law	storyboard artist character designer background designer director art director supervising director
2003	Ren & Stimpy "Adult Party Cartoon"	story storyboard artist
2004	The Grim Adventures of Billy & Mandy	story storyboard artist
2004	Evil Con Carne	story (episode "Hector, King of the Britons") storyboard artist (episode "Hector, King of the Britons")
2005	The X's	storyboard artist
2006	Happy Tree Friends	storyboard artist (episode "Doggone It")
2021–2024	Kamp Koral: SpongeBob's Under Years	developer co-executive producer theme song composer
2021–present	The Patrick Star Show	creator developer co-executive producer

=== Short films ===
Year	Title	Notes
1999	Boo Boo Runs Wild	storyboard artist layout artist
1999	A Day in the Life of Ranger Smith	storyboard artist layout artist
2025	Order Up	creative director

=== Feature films ===
Year	Title	Notes
2015	The SpongeBob Movie: Sponge Out of Water	creative supervisor
2024	Saving Bikini Bottom: The Sandy Cheeks Movie	executive producer
2025	Plankton: The Movie	executive producer
2025	The SpongeBob Movie: Search for SquarePants	executive producer
