= Reg Hartt =

Canadian film archivist

- Born: Reginald Hartt; June 12, 1946 (age 80); Minto, New Brunswick, Canada
- Occupations: Film historian; film critic
- Writing career
- Period: 1965–present
- Subject: Film
- Website: cineforum.ca

Reginald Hartt (born June 12, 1946) is a film archivist in Toronto, Ontario. He is known for his stagings of historical and contemporary films at his 40-seat theatre, The Cineforum.

== Career ==
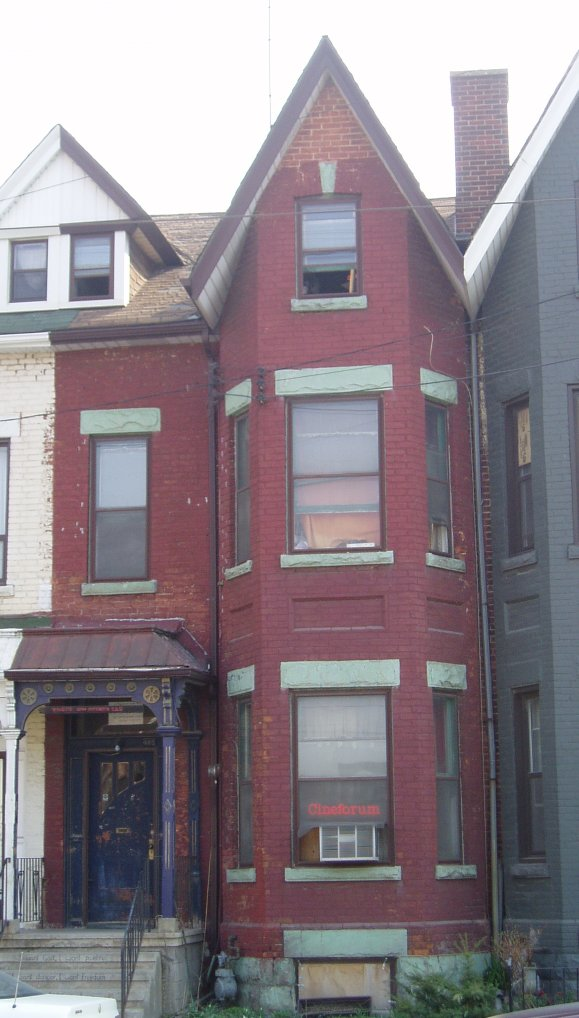
Reg Hartt's Cineforum

Beginning in 1965, Hartt originally screened his films in rented locations. These included the Bathurst Street Church and the Spadina Hotel, as well as Sneaky Dee's, Rochdale College, and locations on Queen Street West and Mirvish Village. From 1970 to 1975, he served as Director of Cinema Studies at Toronto's Rochdale College. He has lectured at art galleries, colleges, museums, schools, theatres, and universities across Canada and in the United States.

Since 1992, he has shown the movies in the front parlor of his Bathurst Street home. An inscription in ancient Greek over the front door read, "Abandon all hope, ye who enter here." Currently, in 2026, a piece of paper above the door shows a Hebrew inscription which translates, roughly, to: "Blessed are you, Jehovah our God. The king of the world gives the true law and the gospel of salvation to his people Israel and to all nations through his Son, Jesus Messiah our Lord." Hartt's black and white typewriter-text-with-film-stills advertising posters are ubiquitous around downtown Toronto to the point where they were used as part of the background of a comic book cover.

== Film presentations ==
The films he nominally screens include "the anarchist surrealist hallucinatory film festival" featuring works of Man Ray, Salvador Dalí, and Luis Buñuel, and "the sex and violence cartoon festival" featuring racy Bugs Bunny cartoons, including some of the infamous Censored Eleven. Other offerings include "Kid Dracula" (Murnau's Nosferatu set to Radiohead's Kid A) and a clean print of Leni Riefenstahl's Triumph of the Will. Although met with controversy, his screenings of Triumph of the Will were condoned by Bernie Farber, the former executive director of the Canadian Jewish Congress. Hartt's collection includes films by Winsor McCay and Mike Jittlov.

Past presentations have included guest programmers. The complete Zatoichi film franchise series was hosted by Grey Coyote of Paradise Bound Music. Charlie Huisken of This Ain't the Rosedale Library is a frequent guest programmer, as were Jamie Ross and also Andre Skinner of Canteen Knockout. Nima Hoda did an in-depth look at the music of Bernard Herrmann for Jason and the Argonauts.

Hartt is known for delivering inspired addresses on the subject of Jesus Christ, cartoons, or anecdotes concerning his varied life experiences as a prologue to, or during, the breaks in his longer programs. His residency at Rochdale College, where he was director of cinema studies, is the topic of a spoken word performance, and he has hosted poetry readings. Hartt has been host to many famous artists and writers, including writer John Robert Colombo, film historian Elwy Yost, rock journalist Al Aronowitz, Jane Jacobs, science-fiction writer Judith Merril, British artist Peter Moore, Canadian animator John Kricfalusi, Bob Clampett, Friz Freleng, Grim Natwick, Shamus Culhane, Bernard B. Brown, and Pierre Berton, who gave his last public reading at the Cineforum.
