= Weekend Pussy Hunt =

Cartoon series

- Created by: John Kricfalusi
- Written by: John Kricfalusi
- Directed by: John Kricfalusi
- Voices of: Wil Branca; Eddie Fitzgerald
- Original language: English
- No. of episodes: 12 (16 planned)

Production
- Producers: Eric Gardner; Kevin Kolde; John Kricfalusi
- Production company: Spümcø

Original release
- Network: Icebox.com
- Release: August 1 – October 17, 2000

Weekend Pussy Hunt is an animated web series in film noir style, created by John Kricfalusi, starring Dirty Dog and Cigarettes the Cat.

The series was initially developed for MSN, which billed it as "the world's first interactive web-based cartoon" and slated it for release in June 1997, but MSN stopped the production before the cartoon was finished. In 2000 the series began airing on Icebox.com, after the release of Spümcø's own web-based Flash cartoon, The Goddamn George Liquor Program.

The first scene was animated prior to Flash's acquisition by Macromedia, when the software was still called FutureSplash Animator.

== History ==
The animation is primarily by Matt Danner (with Albert Lozano, Fred Osmond, Wil Branca and Ken Boyer also animating certain episodes), with storyboards by Jim Smith.

The cartoon features Dirty Dog, Cigarettes the Cat, Brother Dog, Leg Hussy, Bugs Pussy, and Girlfriend. It contains humor intended for adults, such as toilet humor, dick jokes, sexual comedy and ribaldry.

There are interactive segments in the cartoon, which allow the viewer to click parts of the image for an animated result. Most of the episodes begin with an interactive puzzle game.

== Reviews ==
Kricfalusi recalled:

Weekend Pussy Hunt was a film noir cartoon. We serialized it so that every week there'd be a cliffhanger. Its style was a 1940s live-action film noir movie, and we based one of the characters, Dirty Dog, on one of my favorite movie actors, Robert Ryan. Weekend Pussy Hunt was basically a chase movie, a really dark hardboiled thriller. We started off fooling the audience. We wanted them to think it was like a 1940s Warner Brothers chase cartoon between a dog and a cat, but as we moved on, they got uglier and uglier and uglier. You found out more about who this dog was; he was the king of the underworld animals in the neighborhood. So it becomes this ugly dark film noir kind of a movie.

The series was never finished; Icebox ran out of funding. Spümcø's web animation staff was laid off just before Thanksgiving, during the production of episode 13, with about four episodes left to go.

Cigarettes the Cat was featured in the music video for Weird Al's song "Close but No Cigar".

== See also ==
- Spümcø
- John Kricfalusi
- The Ren & Stimpy Show
