= Animation department =

Team in a film studio that works on animation

Animation departments (or animation production departments) are the teams within a film studio that work on various aspects of animation such as storyboarding or 3D modeling. It can refer to a single department that handles animation as a whole or to multiple departments that handle specific tasks. It can also refer to a college department.

== Departments of animation ==
- Retake department - looks for mistakes in animation and has it redone. An animator will check all frames one by one in order to ensure they flow smoothly.
- Compositing department - handles special effects such as chroma keying and other aspects of compositing.
- Inbetweening department - creates in-betweens, the frames that go between key frames (the main points of action in a scene) that make up the bulk of an animation.
- Editing department - compiles and edits the animation (either in part or in its entirety) so that it is consistent.
- Background department - draws the background art for scenes.
- Storyboard department - plans out the animation using sketches of its main points (a storyboard).
- Scanning department - converts traditionally-drawn media to digital and ensures frames are not lost in the process.
- Sound effects and musical scoring department - creates soundtracks and sound effects, such as with choirs, instruments, and Foley.
- Layout department - stages scenes and creates plans for how a scene should look.

== See also ==
- Graphics
- Cinematography
- Computer Technology
