= Spümcø =

Defunct American animation studio

Spümcø, Inc.
- Type: Private
- Industry: Animation
- Founded: December 29, 1989; 36 years ago
- Founders: John Kricfalusi; Bob Camp; Jim Smith; Lynne Naylor
- Defunct: July 18, 2005; 21 years ago
- Fate: Ceased operations
- Successor: Spümtwø; John K. Studios
- Headquarters: Los Angeles, California, U.S.
- Key people: John Kricfalusi (president); Stephen Worth (producer and animation historian); Kevin Kolde (vice-president and general manager)
- Products: Animated series; Flash animated series; Music videos; Animated shorts; Animated commercials; Comic books
- Website: Spumco's Wonderful World of Cartoons!

Spümcø, Inc. (/ˈspuːmkoʊ/ SPOOM-koh; stylized as SPÜMCØ) was an American animation studio based in Los Angeles, California, that was active from December 29, 1989 to July 18, 2005. The studio was best known for producing the first two seasons of The Ren & Stimpy Show for Nickelodeon, as well as various commercials. The studio won several awards, including an Annie Award for Best Animated Short Subject for the music video of the song "I Miss You" by Björk.

Spümcø was founded by animators John Kricfalusi, Bob Camp, Jim Smith and Lynne Naylor. Kricfalusi named the company after the fictional person "Raymond Spüm", whom he jokingly described as the inventor of animation. The golden age of American animation (exemplified by the 1940s cartoons by Chuck Jones, Bob Clampett and Tex Avery) served as inspiration for the surreal and highly expressive house style of which Spümcø became well known.

== History ==
=== Origins ===
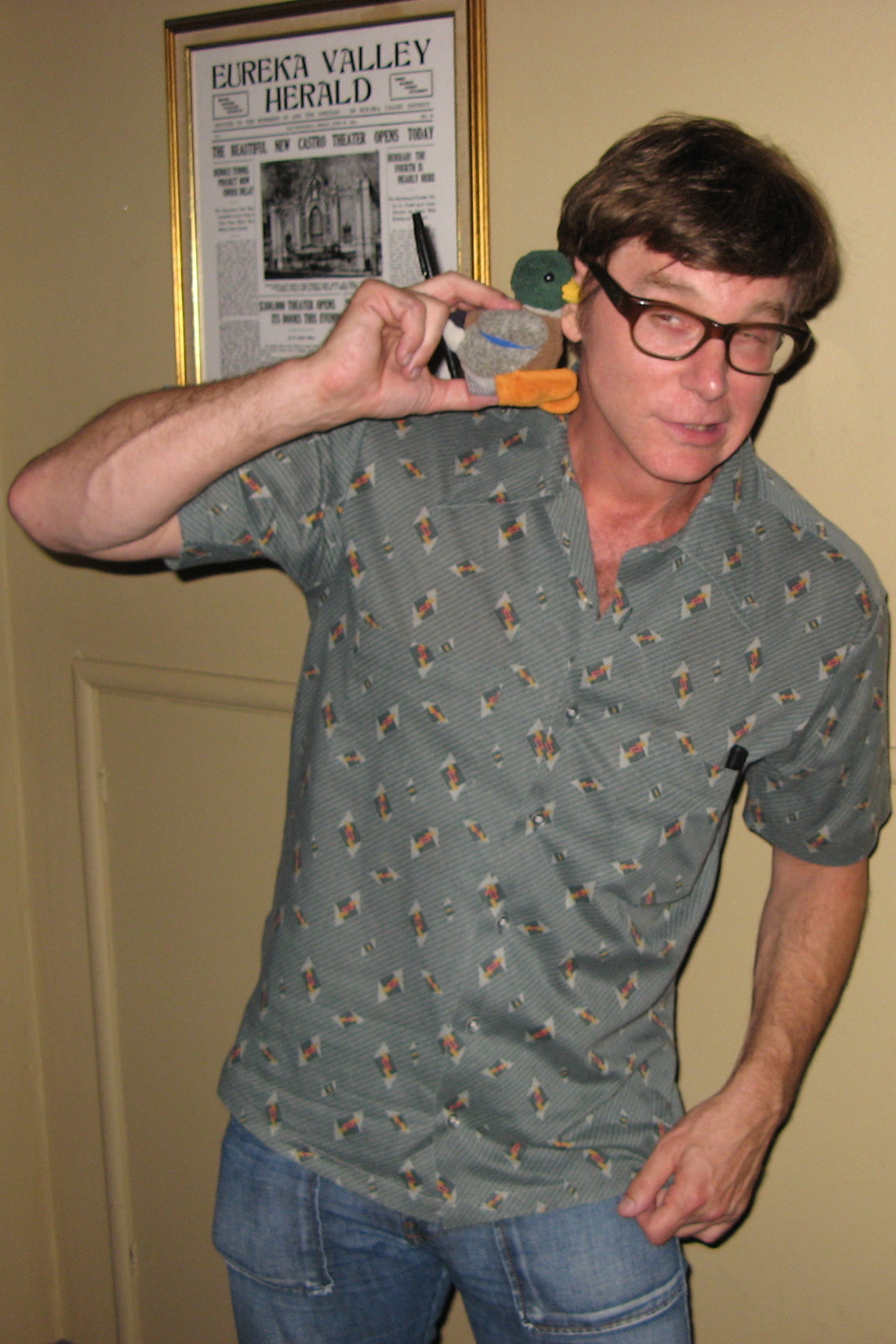
John Kricfalusi, head of Spümcø

Before founding Spümcø, animators John Kricfalusi and Lynne Naylor attempted to sell original cartoon ideas while working for various animation studios and production companies, but the ideas were ultimately rejected. Due to these various rejections, Kricfalusi and Naylor, alongside cartoonists Bob Camp and Jim Smith, founded their own animation studio, Spümcø, in Los Angeles, California in 1989. Soon thereafter, Nickelodeon announced that they were looking for new cartoons created by cartoonists.

Kricfalusi explains the name Spümcø: "Well, it's a weird coincidence. The word spüm is the word for 'quality' in Danish. But it's actually named after Raymond Spüm, the guy who invented animation in 1856." Despite Kricfalusi's claims, Spüm is not a Danish word and Raymond Spüm is a fictional figure.

Spümcø was headquartered west of Paramount Studios at 5625 Melrose Avenue in a bland concrete industrial building. Amy Harmon of The New York Times described the "not-quite-underground headquarters" as "a nondescript building".

=== The Ren & Stimpy Show ===
The Ren & Stimpy Show title card

A few months after founding Spümcø, Kricfalusi pitched five cartoon ideas to Nickelodeon. Geraldine Laybourne, the president of Nickelodeon at the time, chose two of these cartoons: Ren & Stimpy and Jimmy the Idiot Boy, the former being initially rejected by three other major American television networks. Ultimately, Kricfalusi decided to sell Ren & Stimpy to Nickelodeon, which led to Spümcø's first animated series production, The Ren & Stimpy Show.

Because Nickelodeon had no original cartoon material prior to the hiring of Kricfalusi, the network was unaware of the basic process of producing an animated cartoon. Kricfalusi volunteered to give Nickelodeon executives an informative background of cartoonists using storyboards for storytelling in animated cartoons, rather than a script. Vanessa Coffey, who eventually became vice-president of animation production at Nickelodeon, listened to Kricfalusi's lessons and background briefing of the animation industry, and was pleased to learn about how the process works. Coffey agreed with Kricfalusi that, "If storyboards were good enough for Bugs Bunny, they were good enough for her."

Spümcø finished the pilot "Big House Blues" in October 1990 and it aired on August 11, 1991, premiering alongside Doug and Rugrats. Spümcø continued to produce the show for the next two years, while encountering issues with Nickelodeon's standards and practices. Over the next couple of years, a number of episodes were censored.

Kricfalusi described Nickelodeon in the earliest period as being "simple" as there was one executive, Coffey, whom he said that he got along with. Kricfalusi said that another executive, who came during a later period in the show, tried to prevent some of the Ren & Stimpy episodes from being produced. According to Kricfalusi, the episodes continued production since he had established a "trade" with Coffey of balancing "really crazy" episodes with "heart-warming" episodes.

=== After Nickelodeon ===
Nickelodeon fired Kricfalusi in 1992 and immediately formed Games Animation to take over production of Ren & Stimpy. Kricfalusi confirmed that the primary reason for the Nickelodeon executives' decision seemed to be due to the level of violence in Ren & Stimpy. He specifically referred to the episode "Man's Best Friend", which features Ren beating the character George Liquor with an oar, as the probable cause for his firing. Nickelodeon banned the episode from airing; the episode did not air in North America until Ren & Stimpy "Adult Party Cartoon" began in 2003.

Bill Wray, a production artist for Ren & Stimpy, described the main issues regarding Kricfalusi's conflict with Nickelodeon as not being able to meet deadlines for production. Wray stated that Kricfalusi attributed the delays to Nickelodeon "not approving things fast enough", and Nickelodeon staff members "changing their minds" over what can or cannot be produced. Wray said that Kricfalusi believed that the product's quality holds more importance than meeting deadlines, and that he perceived Nickelodeon as "slowing him down". According to Wray, Kricfalusi believed, "[E]very step after the storyboards weakens the process", and that he "fought for the integrity of the storyboards", and lengthened production time because he wished to salvage the quality of the series. Wray stated, "On some occasions Kricfalusi completed an episode in eight months. Other occasions, he completed an episode in two or three months." Wray described Kricfalusi's ideal production period per episode as four half-hour cartoons per year, and added that the arrangement would not "jibe with our production schedule".

Kevin Kolde became a key figure of the company, working as a vice president and general manager, enabling Spümcø to continue producing content for over a decade after the original run of Ren & Stimpy. Aaron Springer was hired as an animator at the company from 1997 to 1998.

In 1997, Björk, a long-time fan of Kricfalusi's work, insisted on him doing an animated music video for her when they met at one of her concerts. Kricfalusi subsequently directed the music video for "I Miss You", a single that was released the same year. It premiered on MTV as well as Canada's MuchMusic channel and Asia's Channel V. "I Miss You" won an Annie Award for Best Animated Short Subject in 1997, from the International Animated Film Association, ASIFA-Hollywood.

A variety of techniques were used for the production of the video: traditional 2-D cel animation by Spümcø and Colorkey Productions; 3-D computer animation supervised by Charlie Gibson at Rhythm & Hues; real-time motion capture animation by House of Moves; and blue screen mattes brought live-action into the mix. The live-action sequences with Björk were shot in a Los Angeles studio in one day. The entire music video took nine months to complete.

In 1997, Spümcø launched its own website to distribute cartoons without television network censorship. Kricfalusi reused George Liquor, whom he had purchased the rights to from MTV Networks after his firing, as the titular and main character in the Flash Internet cartoon series The Goddamn George Liquor Program. The series premiered on October 15, 1997. The Goddamn George Liquor Program was the first cartoon series to be produced exclusively for the Internet. George appeared on the series with: his nephew, Jimmy The Idiot Boy; Jimmy's cousins, Slab and Ernie; Jimmy's love interest, Sody Pop; and George and Jimmy's pet dog, Dirty Dog. Spümcø produced eight one-minute shorts. In 1999, The Goddamn George Liquor Program won an Annie Award for "Outstanding Achievement in an Animated Interactive Production".

In 1999, Spümcø created its second Internet-only cartoon series, Weekend Pussy Hunt. The series had 12 episodes, with 4 cartoons unfinished due to budget problems. The series starred Dirty Dog and Cigarettes the Cat. When asked about the style of the cartoon series, creator Kricfalusi stated:

Its style was a 1940s live action film-noir movie and we based one of the characters "Dirty Dog", on one of my favourite movie actors Robert Ryan. "WPH (Weekend Pussy Hunt)" was basically a chase movie; a really dark hardboiled thriller.

In 1999, Spümcø produced and animated a Yogi Bear television special parody titled Boo Boo Runs Wild, which premiered on September 24, 1999, on Cartoon Network as part of the Yogi Bear marathon. The animated short focuses on Yogi Bear's sidekick, Boo Boo Bear, who becomes fed up with the rules of man and decides to return to his natural bear roots. Though it focused primarily on Yogi and Boo Boo, it was titled as a "Ranger Smith cartoon". A second Ranger Smith cartoon aired alongside it, titled A Day in the Life of Ranger Smith, as well as two Jetsons cartoons titled Father & Son Day and The Best Son.

=== Later years and closure ===
After Nickelodeon fired Kricfalusi from The Ren & Stimpy Show in September 1992, he had plans to make a feature film starring the world's "manliest men". The feature film plan was scrapped, but the characters were then used in the 2001 animated series The Ripping Friends. As early as a 1987 story session for the Mighty Mouse: The New Adventures, Kricfalusi had proposed using a wad of gum as a character, an idea which was used to create the first villain for the new series Indigestible Wad. The Ripping Friends premiered on September 22, 2001, and ran until January 26, 2002.

During 2002, after The Ripping Friends had been cancelled, Kricfalusi was contacted by cable network TNN (later Spike TV, now Paramount Network) which was struggling for ratings and needed a new audience. In June 2003, Ren & Stimpy "Adult Party Cartoon" premiered with three episodes, ones which used plots developed for The Ren & Stimpy Show. The entire show was produced by Spümcø, which had complete creative control over the content. The animation was produced by Carbunkle Cartoons and PiP Animation Services. The series also premiered along with a formerly censored episode from the first two seasons of The Ren & Stimpy Show. The plot of Adult Party Cartoon focused on the adventures of the duo from the original cartoon series. Six episodes were originally meant to air during the summer of 2003, but were delayed for a year along with the rest of Spike TV's adult animated lineup, mainly because of its risqué content including Stripperella, and even Adult Party Cartoon with its own "Naked Beach Frenzy" episode. Spike TV planned to bring the show back with the final remaining episodes on August 20, 2004, but delayed the series and cancelled it in early July 2003. On July 18, 2006, Paramount Home Entertainment released a DVD collection titled Ren & Stimpy: The Lost Episodes, which contained uncensored versions of all of the Ren & Stimpy "Adult Party Cartoon" episodes.

In these years, Spümcø co-produced three video games for which they provided character designs and animations. The first two games were Yoake no Mariko and Yoake no Mariko 2nd Act, two voice acting simulation games in which the goal is for the player to deliver fitting performances of lines from movie scenes of different genres that are playing on-screen. The games were developed in collaboration with Sony Computer Entertainment, and released exclusively in Japan for the PlayStation 2 on December 6, 2001, and January 24, 2002, respectively. The third and final game was Go! Go! Hypergrind, a skateboarding game released on the GameCube by Atlus in North America on November 18, 2003. It features a crew of 11 animated characters who compete to become the next star of an upcoming Spümcø animated show on extreme skateboarding. The game's story states that Toon World is helping Spümcø "to renew interest in the medium and revive the struggling economy [of traditional cel animation]".

On July 18, 2005, Kricfalusi decided to shut down Spümcø shortly thereafter, following a lawsuit by Carbunkle which was filed against Spümcø in the Canadian court system over royalties and credit for Bob Jaques's contributions to Ren and Stimpy. In the summer of 2008, Kricfalusi made a partial payment to Jaques after Jaques had ceased seeking legal action against him. The Spümcø trademark expired in 2007.

=== Legacy ===
Spümcø's influence on Nickelodeon Animation Studio was immaculate, as basically every person of note who worked at Spümcø had varying involvement in productions by the studio. Doug Lawrence, a layout assistant on the show, became a key writer on Rocko's Modern Life and SpongeBob SquarePants. Members who initially refused to join Games Animation, including Vincent Waller and Richard Pursel, co-founders Bob Camp and Lynne Naylor, Games Animation hires Chris Reccardi and Bill Wray as well as later Spümcø employees including Aaron Springer would work on SpongeBob of varying capacities; Waller serves as a showrunner on the series as of 2025. Jim Smith also joined the studio to work on The X's, with Kricfalusi apparently allowed to return for a voice cameo. Kricfalusi also pitched a Ren & Stimpy short film for the release of The SpongeBob Movie: Sponge Out of Water to the studio that did not materialize.

In 2016, it was announced on Tumblr that Kricfalusi and former Cartoon Network storyboard artist Gabe Del Valle were starting a new studio based in the Los Angeles area and were seeking new employees. The name of the studio was not included in the announcement, but was inferred to be "Spümtwø" by the presence of "spumtwo" in the contact email. However, the announcement was removed from Del Valle's Tumblr account sometime afterward, most likely due to Del Valle being rehired by Cartoon Network shortly afterward.

On March 4, 2017, Kricfalusi announced a second new studio to be based in Miami, Florida, named John K. Studios. The studio's only project was an animated short for Adult Swim, which advertised the then-upcoming UFC 200 match on July 9, 2016, produced prior to the announcement of forming the company. The promo was also a collaborative effort with Beavis and Butt-Head and King of the Hill creator Mike Judge, as it features both characters George Liquor and King of the Hill character Hank Hill enjoying the UFC fight. The short was referred to as the "big project" in Del Valle's previous announcement. However, as of July 2018, the studio website is offline.

== Documentary ==
On February 1, 2013, Sick Little Monkeys: The Unauthorized Ren and Stimpy Story was published by animation historian Thad Komorowski. The book contains a detailed history of Spümcø and both Ren & Stimpy series; Kricfalusi was not happy with his depiction in the book.

Also in 2013, a website was created to promote a documentary about the Spümcø animation studio. A teaser trailer was posted on Vimeo which included brief interviews with Kricfalusi, Spümcø staffer Eddie Fitzgerald and self-proclaimed Spümcø fan and singer-songwriter "Weird Al" Yankovic, and clips from Ren & Stimpy and other former Spümcø series, giving the impression that it was authorized by Kricfalusi. In 2014 or 2015, however, the website was taken down and the Vimeo account was deleted without notice or explanation. Many of Kricfalusi's fans were left wondering if the people involved in the project were unable to obtain further funding, a distribution agreement, or the proper licensing to use clips.

A documentary film was released entitled Happy Happy Joy Joy: The Ren and Stimpy Story, directed and produced by Ron Cicero and Kimo Easterwood, was released in 2020. The documentary covers Kricfalusi, his company Spümcø, and even Ren and Stimpy as a series. The film consists of interviews from former Spümcø staff, as well as such animators as Tom Minton, David Silverman and Chris Prynoski, former Nickelodeon executive Vanessa Coffey, and even actor, comedian, musician, and Ren & Stimpy fan Jack Black.

== See also ==
- List of Spümcø works
- Nickelodeon Animation Studio
