= Ren & Stimpy "Adult Party Cartoon" =

American adult animated television series

- Genre: Adult animation; Animated sitcom; Black comedy; Surreal humor; Satire; Slapstick; Toilet humor; Gross-out
- Created by: John Kricfalusi
- Based on: The Ren & Stimpy Show by John Kricfalusi
- Directed by: John Kricfalusi
- Voices of: John Kricfalusi; Eric Bauza; Cheryl Chase; Harris Peet; Mike Kricfalusi; Tom Hay; Katie Rice; Ralph Bakshi
- Opening theme: "Dog Pound Hop" performed by Die Screaming Lederhosens (Jim Smith, Chris Reccardi, and Scott Huml)
- Ending theme: "Big House Blues" performed by Die Screaming Lederhosens
- Country of origin: United States
- Original language: English
- No. of seasons: 1
- No. of episodes: 6 (3 aired + 3 unaired)

Production
- Executive producers: Kevin Kolde; Eric Gardner; Albie Hecht; Kevin Kay
- Producers: Jessica Belrne; Kelly Armstrong; Bob Jaques; Tae Soo Kim
- Running time: 22–45 minutes
- Production company: Spümcø

Original release
- Network: TNN/Spike TV
- Release: June 26 – July 24, 2003

Related
- The Ren & Stimpy Show

Ren & Stimpy "Adult Party Cartoon" is an American adult animated comedy television series created by John Kricfalusi and produced by Spümcø for TNN / Spike TV. The series was developed as a more extreme revamp and reboot of Nickelodeon's The Ren & Stimpy Show, whose first two seasons were produced by Spümcø.

The series premiered on June 26, 2003, and was removed from the network on July 24, after airing three episodes; the remaining episodes were released on DVD.

While the series did receive praise for its animation quality, Adult Party Cartoon was heavily panned by critics, audiences and fans of the original series for its humor, tone, and deviations from its predecessor, leading to its abrupt cancellation. It has since been widely regarded as one of the worst animated series ever made.

== History ==
The original Ren & Stimpy Show premiered alongside Rugrats and Doug as one of the original Nicktoons on the children's network Nickelodeon in 1991. The show's creator, John Kricfalusi, had many altercations with the network, eventually culminating in his termination the following year. The series continued until 1995 at Games Animation, with issues prevalent during Kricfalusi's tenure still present; it eventually ended with a single episode airing on MTV in 1996. In 2002, about a decade after Kricfalusi's termination, Viacom contacted him to produce a new version of his series for an updated version of sister network TNN/Spike TV, which was devoted to programming for male audiences. Kricfalusi said that TNN wanted an "extreme" version of The Ren & Stimpy Show. TNN gave Kricfalusi greater control of the writing and contents of the episodes, and he produced six "new" episodes aimed at adult audiences; of the episodes, "Altruists" was not a leftover from the original series, being an original idea from Eric Bauza. As in the original series, Kricfalusi ran into problems with meeting production deadlines and budgetary limits, with three out of the nine episodes ordered by the network being completed on time at the cost of the entire nine-episode budget initially allocated by Spike.

Several alumni from the original series returned to work on the new episodes, most notably co-developer Jim Smith, director and writer Vincent Waller as well as production assistant and writer Richard Pursel. Animation studio Carbunkle Cartoons returned to provide animation services, with Bob Jaques serving as animation director. Most Ren & Stimpy alumni who had joined Games Animation in the wake of Kricfalusi's 1992 firing, including series developer Bob Camp, had become estranged from Kricfalusi and thus were not involved with the revival; Vincent Waller, having joined the studio after the original series ended, was an exception. Some of the original voice cast members returned, with the exception of Billy West, the original voice of Stimpy and second voice of Ren and Mr. Horse, who turned down offers to reprise his role as Stimpy as he did not consider the series to be funny and felt that participating in it would damage his career. Eric Bauza was hired to replace West as Stimpy, while Kricfalusi reprised his roles as Ren and Mr. Horse. Cast members Harris Peet and Cheryl Chase also returned, and Kricfalusi's father Mike Kricfalusi and long-time childhood friend Tom Hay provided some voices. Pursel, who worked on the series as a storyboard artist and writer, despised the work experience, considering it to be his worst; Kricfalusi refused to communicate with him directly and would add shock value to his stories.

The new series began airing in June 2003 as part of an animation block also featuring Gary the Rat, Stripperella, and digitally remastered episodes of the original Ren & Stimpy series, subtitled "Digitally Remastered Classics". Kricfalusi directed the first episode, "Onward and Upward", based on requests from fans from the Nickelodeon era; Vincent Waller wrote the episode for the original series' second season but was rejected by Nickelodeon story editor Will McRobb. "Fire Dogs 2", a sequel to the original series episode "Fire Dogs" featuring Ralph Bakshi, was similarly rejected by McRobb before being remade in Adult Party Cartoon. The episode portrayed the characters as bisexual. Advertisers objected to some of the new show's content, particularly that of the risqué episode "Naked Beach Frenzy", which did not air in the show's original run, causing trouble with scheduling. The show stopped airing after three episodes when TNN's animation block was "put on hold".

The remaining episodes were set to resume in August 2004 along with the premiere of Spike's new animated series Immigrants (developed by fellow Nickelodeon partner Klasky Csupo), but both shows were pulled and never aired.

Kricfalusi shut down Spümcø shortly on July 18, 2005, thereafter following a lawsuit filed by Carbunkle Cartoons for failing to pay the animation studio for their services. In 2005, he announced that all of the Adult Party Cartoon episodes that were fully produced were coming to DVD, which was released by Paramount Home Entertainment as Ren & Stimpy: The Lost Episodes on July 18, 2006.

== Episodes ==
All episodes of the series were directed by series creator John Kricfalusi, credited as "John K." for the first five episodes and "M. John Kricfalusi" for the final episode.

"Onward & Upward" was originally planned to be directed by Vincent Waller, while "Ren Seeks Help" was planned to be directed by Derek Bond, with Kricfalusi as supervising director. However, plans had since changed and Kricfalusi directed the episodes himself.

Ren & Stimpy "Adult Party Cartoon" episodes
No.	Title	Story by	Storyboard by	Original release date	Prod. code
1	"Onward & Upward"	Vincent Waller	Vincent Waller, Eddie Fitzgerald, Fred Osmond & Ray Morelli	June 26, 2003	APC07
Tired of living inside a homeless man's mouth, Ren and Stimpy, presented as a sexually-involved couple, move to the inside of a spittoon after Stimpy pools his secret stash of money into it and proceed to "live the high life" consuming the bodily fluids of barflies.
2	"Ren Seeks Help"	John Kricfalusi & Richard Pursel	Steve Stefanelli, Helder Mendonca, Jeff Amey, Derek Bond, Tavis Silbernagel & John Kricfalusi	July 3, 2003	APC02
After an argument leaves Stimpy distraught and traumatized, Ren finally recognizes the extent of his cruelty towards his friend and seeks therapy from Mr. Horse to control his "vile urges". Ren subsequently recounts his dysfunctional early years and the origin of his sadistic tendencies. Afterwards, Ren reveals (in whispered form) the act that caused Stimpy's opening trauma, leading Mr. Horse to declare Ren insane and assault him violently. Ren responds by reverting to a feral state and beating Mr. Horse to death, forcing an animal control unit to cart the chihuahua away.
3	"Fire Dogs 2"	John Kricfalusi, Richard Pursel, Eddie Fitzgerald, Vincent Waller & Jim Smith	John Kricfalusi, Jim Smith, Eddie Fitzgerald, Vincent Waller & José Pou	July 17, 2003	APC04
3	"Fire Dogs 2"	John Kricfalusi, Richard Pursel, Eddie Fitzgerald, Vincent Waller & Jim Smith	John Kricfalusi, Jim Smith, Eddie Fitzgerald, Vincent Waller & José Pou	July 24, 2003	APC05
Impressed by Ren and Stimpy's deeds from the original "Fire Dogs" episode, the Fire Chief morphs into Ralph Bakshi (voicing himself) and invites the duo to live a bachelor lifestyle in his apartment. Unfortunately, Ren and Stimpy are disgusted by the Fire Chief's habits.
4	"Naked Beach Frenzy"	John Kricfalusi, Michael Kerr, Jeff Amey & Caroline J. Alvarez	Jeff Amey, Steve Stefanelli, Matt Roach & Nick Cross	July 18, 2006 (DVD)	APC01
Ren and Stimpy enjoy a day at a nude beach as Ren tries to mingle with the women, but is unsuccessful since the women are more attracted to Stimpy. Ren and Stimpy are also continuously pestered by a psychotic lifeguard coated in body hair.
5	"Altruists"	Vincent Waller, John Kricfalusi, Mike Kerr, Eric Bauza, Jeff Amey & Richard Pursel	Vincent Waller, Jeff Amey, Nick Cross & Matt Roach	July 18, 2006 (DVD)	APC03
In a homage to The Three Stooges, Ren and Stimpy, who are altruists in this episode, decide that they must do everything in their power to help a couple of misfortunates—a woman and her handicapped (headless) son—by building a house for them.
6	"Stimpy's Pregnant"	John Kricfalusi, Jeff Amey, Richard Pursel, Matt Roach, Steve Stefanelli & Warren Leonheardt	John Kricfalusi, Jeff Amey, Richard Pursel, Matt Roach, Steve Stefanelli & Warren Leonheardt	July 18, 2006 (DVD)	APC06
Stimpy ostensibly becomes pregnant with Ren's baby. Ren is at first disgusted with Stimpy's pregnancy but comes to accept it. When Stimpy goes into labor, Ren is forced to start a driveby with other people on the highway. With help from the police, Ren and Stimpy successfully get to the hospital, where their child is delivered by Dr. Mr. Horse, only to learn that Stimpy was just constipated. However, Dr. Mr. Horse does not have the heart to tell the anticipated "parents" this and enables the couple to name their "child" (a living, breathing, baby boy made entirely out of feces) "Little Ricky".

A scrapped episode called "Life Sucks", intended as a prequel to "Ren Seeks Help", was going to be on the DVD, but it was never produced on time. In the episode, Ren states his dislike of life, much to Stimpy's horror. After that, they have an extensive look at life's past tragedies, like the Children's Crusade. This was intended to be context to Ren and Stimpy's heated argument. Production had begun on this episode, with some voice work and roughly a third of the storyboard completed at the time of the show's cancellation.

== Reception and legacy ==
Unlike its predecessor, "Adult Party Cartoon" was universally panned by critics and audiences, as well as fans of the original series. Rob Owen of the Pittsburgh Post-Gazette described it as "just plain gross. ... They don't pay me enough to watch cartoon characters eating snot." Charles Solomon of the Los Angeles Times criticized the show as "'adult' only in the sense that you wouldn’t want kids watching them." Tucson Weekly and Exclaim! both labeled it "disastrous". DVD Talk praised the show's animation, "but the weak stories epitomize empty, heavy-handed shock value." Matt Schimkowitz of Splitsider opined that the show's intended audience was "the 16-year-olds who grew up on the [original] show and are ready to handle such hilarious topics as spousal abuse and eating boogers."

PopMatters was more favorable, writing: "With snot as side dishes and vomit as gravy, the foulness is overwhelming, yet also clever. Kricfalusi's satire may be obvious, but he's not just making puke jokes for nausea's sake." Thad Komorowski, a historian on the original series and this series, noted that the reboot's poor performance originated from too many factors at play, and its reputation as one of the worst animated series of all time to be an exaggeration; he stated that the lack of involvement from individuals like Bob Camp and Chris Reccardi as well as its utilization of rejected episodes from the series contributed to its downfall.

== See also ==
- "Man's Best Friend" (The Ren & Stimpy Show)
- Happy Happy Joy Joy: The Ren and Stimpy Story – the 2020 documentary film

== Sources ==
- Komorowski, Thad (2013). Sick Little Monkeys: The Unauthorized Ren & Stimpy Story. Bear Manor Media. ISBN 978-1593932343.
