= The Goddamn George Liquor Program =

American animated web series (1997–1998)

- Created by: John Kricfalusi
- Voices of: Michael Pataki; John Kricfalusi
- Original language: English
- No. of episodes: 8

Production
- Production company: Spümcø

Original release
- Release: October 15, 1997 – 1998

The Goddamn George Liquor Program is a 1997 Adobe Flash animated web series created by John Kricfalusi and starring the animated character George Liquor. It was originally developed as a web-based cartoon by Microsoft's then-new MSN, in partnership with Spümcø studio. After failing to receive approval for publishing from Microsoft, all properties were released to Spümcø, and the web-based cartoon was spun out directly by the studio. Michael Pataki reprised his role as Liquor from The Ren & Stimpy Show. Spümcø produced eight one-minute shorts. The budget for each episode was $25,000.

Premiering on October 15, 1997, The Goddamn George Liquor Program was the first animated cartoon series to be produced exclusively for the internet. George appeared on the series with his nephew, Jimmy The Idiot Boy; Jimmy's cousins, Slab and Ernie; Jimmy's love interest, Sody Pop; and George and Jimmy's pet dog, Dirty Dog. Without the control of a network, the series could be made as Kricfalusi wanted. The Goddamn George Liquor Program won the 1999 Annie Award for "Outstanding Achievement in an Animated Interactive Production". Later, the show was developed as a series of cartoon commercials for Pontiac Vibe. The new series remained unreleased after General Motors discontinued the Pontiac Vibe auto line in 2009.

== Characters ==
The following characters appear in The Goddamn George Liquor Program.

- George Liquor, American – Liquor is an ultra-patriotic American.
- Jimmy the Idiot Boy – Jimmy is an incredibly stupid teenage boy and George's nephew.
- Sody Pop – Sody is a 15-year-old Canadian girl who is Jimmy's love interest. But George Liquor tells her to stay away from Jimmy.
- Slab 'n' Ernie – Slab and Ernie, two bullies, are George's nephews and Jimmy's cousins.
- Dirty Dog – Dirty Dog, the "neighborhood watchdog", does not like cats. In the first episode of The Goddamn George Liquor Program Dirty defecates on a lawn, upsetting the sun.

Other characters who appear in comic:

- Mable – Mable was George Liquor's wife. After she died, George Liquor preserved her torso and legs and nailed the parts to a trophy stand with the buttocks facing the room.
- Merle – 30-year-old Merle, a "health nut", is Sody's older sister. Merle tries to seduce George Liquor.
- "The Bad Catholic Girls" – Three Catholic school teenage girls who smoke, trying to "corrupt" Jimmy.
- Mildrew – Mildrew, Slab and Ernie's mother, is married to Frank, George's brother. George Liquor sometimes flirts with her.
- Cigarettes the Cat – Cigarettes is Jimmy's pet cat.
- Victor Lugnuts – Lugnuts operates "Victor Lugnuts' House of Meats".
- Victor Produce – Lugnuts's rival, Victor Produce, operates a vegetable store.
- Eddie the Town Atheist – Eddie, an atheist, is Lugnuts's son. George tries to convince him to adopt Christianity.
- General "Buck" Neckfold – Neckfold, a general at The Pentagon, is one of George Liquor's friends.
- Nutty the Friendly Dump – A piece of feces that Jimmy carries around and treats as a friend, with corn kernels for eyes.
- Dr. Stump – Stump, George Liquor's family doctor, prescribes amputation as treatment for various ills.
- Harvey Whiteman, the Barber – Whiteman is George Liquor's barber.
- "The Lord" – God is one of George Liquor's "fishing buddies".
