= The Ren & Stimpy Show =

American animated comedy television series

- Genre: Animated sitcom; Black comedy; Surreal humor; Satire; Slapstick
- Created by: John Kricfalusi
- Developed by: John Kricfalusi; Bob Camp; Jim Smith; Lynne Naylor
- Showrunners: John Kricfalusi (Note: Seasons 1–2); Bob Camp (Note: Seasons 3–5)
- Voices of: John Kricfalusi; Billy West; Gary Owens; Harris Peet; Cheryl Chase; Alan Young; Jack Carter; Bob Camp; Michael Pataki
- Theme music composer: John Kricfalusi; Chris Reccardi; Jim Smith; Scott Huml
- Opening theme: "Dog Pound Hop" performed by Die Screaming Lederhosens (Jim Smith, Chris Reccardi, and Scott Huml)
- Ending theme: "Big House Blues" performed by Die Screaming Lederhosens
- Composers: Shawn Patterson (Note: "Ol' Blue Nose" and "Sammy and Me"); Guy Moon (Note: "Blazing Entrails" and "A Scooter for Yaksmas"); Chris Reccardi (Note: "Hard Times for Haggis", "Hermit Ren" and "Ren's Brain"); Charlie Brissette; Andy Paley
- Country of origin: United States
- Original language: English
- No. of seasons: 5
- No. of episodes: 52 (93 segments) (list of episodes)

Production
- Executive producers: Vanessa Coffey; Mary Harrington
- Producers: John Kricfalusi; Christine Danzo (Note: Season 1); Jim Ballantine (Note: Seasons 2–5)
- Running time: 22 minutes 8-11 minutes (segments)
- Production companies: Spümcø; Games Animation

Original release
- Network: Nickelodeon
- Release: August 11, 1991 – December 16, 1995
- Network: MTV
- Release: October 20, 1996

Related
- Ren & Stimpy "Adult Party Cartoon"

The Ren & Stimpy Show, also known simply as Ren & Stimpy, is an American animated comedy television series created by John Kricfalusi for Nickelodeon. The series follows the misadventures of Ren Höek, an emotionally unstable and psychotic chihuahua; and Stimpy, a good-natured and dimwitted Manx cat. Originally produced by Spümcø, the series was shown on Nickelodeon from August 11, 1991, to December 16, 1995, with its last episode running on MTV on October 20, 1996, spanning a total of five seasons and 52 episodes (93 segments). The third to be shown of the original three Nickelodeon animated series known as "Nicktoons", alongside Doug and Rugrats, it is one of the progenitor series of the brand.

The series received widespread critical acclaim for its visuals, animation, and surreal nature. However, it generated significant controversy for its dark humor, sexual innuendo, adult humor, violence, and shock value, contributing to Kricfalusi's termination in 1992, due to altercations with Nickelodeon's Standards and Practices and production delays. Games Animation produced the show's remaining three seasons, which received criticism for a perceived decline in quality.

An adult animated reboot, Ren & Stimpy "Adult Party Cartoon", was produced by Kricfalusi and Spümcø and aired on Spike TV in 2003, being canceled early due to a combination of negative reviews and production delays. On August 5, 2020, Comedy Central announced a second reboot of the series without Kricfalusi's involvement.

== Premise ==
The series centers on Ren Höek (voiced by John Kricfalusi in seasons 1–2; Billy West in seasons 2–5), a hot-tempered, psychotic, "asthma-hound" chihuahua, and Stimpson J. "Stimpy" Cat (also voiced by Billy West), a dimwitted and happy-go-lucky Manx cat. The duo fill various roles from episode to episode, including outer-space explorers, Old West horse thieves, and nature-show hosts, and are usually at odds with each other in these situations. While the show was sometimes set in the present day, the show's crew tended to avoid "contemporary" jokes about current events. The show extensively features off-color and absurdist humor, as well as slapstick akin to animated shorts of the 1950s.

The show features a host of supporting characters. Due to the nature of the show, they do not have consistent appearances or even designs; those who do appear repeatedly have different roles in each appearance, being either a part of the storyline or making cameo appearances with little bearing on the plot. Some, such as Mr. Horse, are exclusively cameo-based, spontaneously appearing as a running gag. George Liquor makes his first appearances in the show through cameos or as a supporting character, as demonstrated in "Dog Show" and "Man's Best Friend".

== Development and history ==
=== Conception ===
According to animator Bill Wray, John Kricfalusi created the characters Ren and Stimpy in 1978 for "personal amusement" while studying at Sheridan College. He was inspired to create Ren by an Elliott Erwitt photograph, printed on a postcard, titled "New York City, Circa 1950", showing a sweatered chihuahua at a woman's feet. Stimpy's design was inspired by the cat duo from the 1945 Merrie Melodies cartoon A Gruesome Twosome, who had big noses.

Approached by Nickelodeon for ideas for a show, Kricfalusi presented three. One was a variety show called Your Gang or Our Gang in which children presented cartoons, each parodying a different genre. Ren and Stimpy were pets of one of the presenters, and their cartoons would be in the style of Tom and Jerry. Vanessa Coffey, vice president of animation production, was uninterested in the ideas, but liked Ren and Stimpy, singling them out for their own series.

Production of the pilot, "Big House Blues", began in the summer of 1989, after The Ren & Stimpy Show was successfully pitched to Nickelodeon, and it was conducted by Spümcø, Kricfalusi's Los Angeles-based animation company. A few months later, after the pilot had been screened at film festivals, it was announced that the show would be one of the channel's first Nicktoons.

Kricfalusi mainly credited Bob Clampett for his series as well as other animators such as Chuck Jones, Tex Avery, Jay Ward and Max Fleischer. He additionally liked the comic artists such as Frank Frazetta, Johnny Hart, Jack Kirby and Charles M. Schulz as well as Hanna-Barbera and Mad Magazine.

=== Spümcø (1991–1993) ===
The series premiered on August 11, 1991, alongside two other Nicktoons, Doug and Rugrats. Spümcø continued to produce the show for the next two years while encountering issues with Nickelodeon's Standards and Practices department. The show was known for its lack of early merchandising; according to Wray, the initial lack of merchandise was "the unique and radical thing" about The Ren & Stimpy Show, as no toy company planned for any merchandise for the show, and Nickelodeon did not want to use "over-exploitive" merchandising.

Kricfalusi described his early period with Nickelodeon as being "simple", as he got along with Coffey, the sole executive of the program. When another executive was added, they wanted to alter or discard some of the Ren & Stimpy episodes, but Kricfalusi says the episodes stayed intact since he did a "trade" with Coffey: he would have some "really crazy" episodes in exchange for some "heart-warming" episodes. Kricfalusi also said that the program was the "safest project [he] ever worked on" while explaining the meaning of "safe" as "spend a third of what they spend now per picture, hire proven creative talent, and let them entertain." He estimated Spümcø's run of The Ren & Stimpy Show cost around $6 million to produce.

The relationship between Kricfalusi and Nickelodeon deteriorated to the point where Kricfalusi would communicate with Nickelodeon only through his lawyer. News outlets and several of the series' staff ascribe the tension to episodes not being delivered promptly. Author Andy Mangels, writing for Wizard magazine, commented that "Kricfalusi's lax treatment of deadlines angered not only the networks, but his loyal viewers as well." However, some of the delays were attributed to Nickelodeon's prolonged approval process and withdrawal of approval from scenes and episodes that had been previously approved. Another point of contention was the direction of the series. Kricfalusi cites the episode "Man's Best Friend" as the primary reason for his dismissal; the character George Liquor is depicted in the episode as an abusive father figure, and Nickelodeon did not want the show to be so frightening and dramatic.

=== Games Animation (1992–1996) ===
Nickelodeon terminated Kricfalusi's contract in late September 1992 and offered him the position of consultant for Ren & Stimpy, but he refused to "sell out". The network moved production from Spümcø to its newly founded animation studio, Games Animation, which later became Nickelodeon Animation Studio. Bob Camp replaced Kricfalusi as director, while West, having refused Kricfalusi's request to leave along with him, voiced Ren in addition to Stimpy.

Fans and critics felt this was a turning point in the show, with the new episodes being a considerable step down from the standard of those that preceded them. Ted Drozdowski, resident critic of The Boston Phoenix, stated that "the bloom faded" on Ren & Stimpy. Animation historian Michael Barrier writes that while the creators of the Games episodes used crude jokes that were similar to those used by Kricfalusi, they did not "find the material particularly funny; they were merely doing what was expected".

In late January 1995, Mary Harrington came to Games from New York to tell the studio that the show was "ceased indefinitely" rather than "cancelled"; production would wrap up by August 1995. By the end of the series, each segment was produced at around $500,000 each.

The series ended its original run on Nickelodeon on December 16, 1995, with "A Scooter for Yaksmas", and had a total of five seasons and 51 episodes, although one episode from the final season, "Sammy and Me/The Last Temptation", remained unaired. Almost a year later, the episode aired on Nickelodeon's sister network, MTV, on October 20, 1996.

== Production ==
=== Process ===
The animation production methods used in The Ren & Stimpy Show were similar to those found in Golden Age cartoons of the early 20th century, where a director supervised the entire process. These methods are in contrast with animation production methods in the 1980s, where there was one director for animation and a different director for voice actors, and the cartoons were created with a "top-down" approach to tie in with toy production.

Animator Vincent Waller compared working on Ren & Stimpy and SpongeBob SquarePants in an interview: "Working on Ren and Stimpy and SpongeBob was very similar. They're both storyboard-driven shows, which means they give us an outline from a premise after the premise has been approved. We take the outline and expand on it, writing the dialogue and gags. That was very familiar."

=== Animation ===
The show's aesthetics draw on Golden Age cartoons, particularly those of animator Bob Clampett from the 1940s in the way the characters' emotions powerfully distort their bodies. The show's style emphasizes unique expressions, intense and specific acting and strong character poses. One of the show's most notable visual trademarks is the detailed paintings of gruesome close-ups, along with the blotchy ink stains that on occasion replace the standard backgrounds, reminiscent of "holes in reality or the vision of a person in a deep state of dementia". This style was developed from Clampett's Baby Bottleneck, which features several scenes with color-cards for backgrounds. The show incorporated norms from "the old system in TV and radio" where the animation would feature sponsored products to tie in with the cartoon, but in lieu of real advertisements, it featured fake commercial breaks advertising nonexistent products, most notably "Log".

Kricfalusi cited Carbunkle Cartoons, an animation studio headed by Bob Jaques and Kelly Armstrong, for their work on the show's best episodes, improving the acting with subtle nuances and wild animation that could not be done with overseas animation studios. KJ Dell'Antonia of Common Sense Media describes the show's style as changing "from intentionally rough to much more polished and plushie-toy ready."

Notably, a handful of episodes from the second season onwards were also animated not with cels but with digital ink and paint, which was very rare for television animation before 1998. The majority of episodes were still animated traditionally with cels.

=== Voice acting ===
Kricfalusi originally voiced Ren, styled after a demented Peter Lorre from the film The Maltese Falcon. When Nickelodeon terminated Kricfalusi's contract, Billy West, already the voice of Stimpy, took the role using a combination of Burl Ives, Kirk Douglas, and a slight "south of the border accent" for the rest of the Nickelodeon run. West voiced Stimpy for the Spümcø and Games Animation episodes, basing the voice on an "amped-up" Larry Fine. Some notable artists and performers who voiced incidental characters on the show were Frank Zappa (in his final public performance before his death), Jack Carter, Stan Freberg, Tommy Davidson, Randy Quaid, Gilbert Gottfried, Rosie O'Donnell, Dom DeLuise, Phil Hartman, Mark Hamill and Soleil Moon Frye.

=== Music ===
"Dog Pound Hop"
A 24-second portion of the iconic opening theme that contains diverse rockabilly-style elements.

The Ren & Stimpy Show features a wide variety of music, spanning rockabilly, folk, pop, jazz, classical music, jingles, and more. The opening theme, "Dog Pound Hop", was performed by a group of Spümcø employees under the name "Die Screaming Leiderhôsens"; they include developer Jim Smith, animator Chris Reccardi and production assistant Scott Huml. Three Ren & Stimpy albums have been released. In 1993, a compilation album,You Eediot!, was released as a soundtrack album.

Stimpy's rousing anthem titled "Happy, Happy, Joy, Joy" was composed by Chris Reccardi and written by Charlie Brissette and Kricfalusi. A cover performed by Wax is included on the 1995 tribute album Saturday Morning: Cartoons' Greatest Hits, produced by Ralph Sall for MCA Records.

== Controversies and censorship ==
The program's staff did not want to create an "educational" series, a stance that bothered Nickelodeon, leading to the series being criticized by parent groups. Some segments of the show were altered to exclude references to religion, politics, alcohol, violence, and tobacco. The episode "Powdered Toast Man" had a cross removed from the Pope's hat and the credit was changed to "the man with the pointy hat". The same episode had a segment featuring the burning of the United States Constitution and Bill of Rights that was removed, while in "Dog Show", the last name of the character George Liquor was removed, being changed to simply "George, American". Many other episodes included someone smoking a cigar, pipe, or a cigarette.

Several episodes had violent, gruesome, or suggestive scenes shortened or removed, including a sequence involving a severed head, a close-up of Ren's face being grated against a man's stubble, and a scene that was shortened where Ren receives multiple punches to the stomach from a baby. In the second-season episode "Svën Höek", during the scene where Ren fantasizes about brutally murdering Stimpy and his cousin Svën after they break all of his prized possessions, his line "Then...I'm going to gouge your eyes out...yeah..." was cut. One infamous episode, "Man's Best Friend", was banned by Nickelodeon for its violent content. Neither Nickelodeon nor MTV would air the episode. Years later on Spike TV, the show's revival, Ren & Stimpy "Adult Party Cartoon", debuted with this banned episode as their unofficial pilot, receiving a TV-MA rating. Games Animation, however, was allowed to include more risqué content and occasional graphic violence.

== Episodes ==
Season	Segments	Episodes	Originally released	
Season	Segments	Episodes	First released	Last released
Theatrical pilot			August 10, 1990	
1	13	6	August 11, 1991	February 23, 1992
2	18	12	August 15, 1992	May 23, 1993
3	16	10	November 20, 1993	July 30, 1994
4	27	14	October 1, 1994	April 1, 1995
5	17	10	June 3, 1995	October 20, 1996

The series ran for five seasons, spanning 52 episodes. The show was produced by Kricfalusi's animation studio Spümcø for the first two seasons. Beginning with season three (1993–94), the show was produced by Nickelodeon's Games Animation. The episode "Man's Best Friend" was produced for season two, but the episode was shelved and debuted with the show's 2003 reboot. Another episode, "Sammy and Me / The Last Temptation", aired on MTV on October 20, 1996, nearly a year after the original Nickelodeon run ended.

== Reception ==
The iconic "Happy Happy, Joy Joy" scene from "Stimpy's Invention" which is praised for the song's catchiness, the characters' antics, and satirization of mental health.

The Ren & Stimpy Show received widespread critical acclaim. Matt Groening, creator of The Simpsons, praised the show for its outrageousness and called it "the only good cartoon on TV" other than The Simpsons; he was later critical of Kricfalusi's firing. Terry Thoren, former CEO and president of Klasky Csupo, said that Kricfalusi "tapped into an audience that was a lot hipper than anybody thought. He went where no man wanted to go before – the caca, booger humor". Jonathan Valania of The Morning Call called it "high voltage yuks and industrial-strength weirdness", John Lyttle of The Independent described it as "a gooey media meltdown, absolutely grotesque and instantly recognisable" and did not consider it a children's cartoon.

As of 2026, the first season of the show holds a rare 100% approval rating on Rotten Tomatoes based on 12 reviews from critics, though the remaining seasons have not been rated. The site's consensus reads: "Dark and Dadaist, The Ren & Stimpy Show pioneered an animation aesthetic that was undeniably disturbing for all ages."

The show came to garner high ratings for Nickelodeon, having double the viewership of the other Nickelodeon cartoons for its first season and later averaging three times their viewership. Due to the first season's high ratings, Nickelodeon renewed the series for twenty additional episodes in November 1991, alongside the second season of Rugrats and the second and third season of Doug. The show for a time was the most popular cable TV show, with several airings being the most-watched scripted cable TV show in 1993 in the United States. The show quickly developed a cult following in college campuses, and was included in the launch of Nickelodeon's SNICK, a late-night block for shows that appeal to both children and adults.

== Legacy and influence ==
The immediate influence of the show was the spawning of two "clones". Kricfalusi's previous employer Hanna-Barbera produced 2 Stupid Dogs, to which Kricfalusi contributed jokes. Walt Disney Television Animation produced The Shnookums & Meat Funny Cartoon Show to mimic the show's success. The Disney series failed to gain any recognition and remained obscure.

However, The Ren & Stimpy Show had a wider influence on the future of animation. Mike Judge credits the success of Ren & Stimpy reruns on MTV for the network's willingness to commission Beavis and Butt-Head. Writer Larry Brody credits Ren & Stimpy for leading a new golden age of animation, as other networks followed Nickelodeon and invested in new cartoons, opening the way for more adult-oriented satirical shows like Beavis and Butt-Head.

David Feiss, an animation director on the first season of the show, went on to create Cartoon Network's Cow and Chicken and I Am Weasel. John Kricfalusi became a teacher of sorts for Fred Seibert, and was the first person Seibert called while looking for new talent for the project What A Cartoon!. Writer/animator Allan Neuwirth writes that Ren & Stimpy "broke the mold" and started several trends in TV animation, chiefly the revival of credits at the beginning of each episode, the use of grotesque close-ups, and a shift in cartoon color palettes to richer, more harmonious colors.

A direct influence can be seen in the series SpongeBob SquarePants with the physically extreme drawings that contrast with the characters' usual appearance, the "grotesque close-ups". Series veteran Vincent Waller currently serves as a showrunner on SpongeBob.

The characters became a cultural touchstone in the mid-1990s, and were featured in works such as the films Clueless (1995), The Cable Guy, and Jack (both 1996). Ren & Stimpy placed 31st in TV Guide's list of "Top 50 Greatest Cartoon Characters of All Time" in 2002. The cover story of the October 2001 issue of Wizard, a magazine for comic book fans, listed the 100 Greatest Toons ever as selected by their readers, with Ren & Stimpy ranked at number 12. Other entertainment journals similarly hold Ren & Stimpy as one of the best cartoons of the '90s and cartoons for adults.

== Revivals ==
=== Spike TV spin-off ===
In 2003, a reboot of the series helmed by John Kricfalusi, titled Ren & Stimpy "Adult Party Cartoon", was launched on a late night programming block on Spike TV and was rated TV-MA. As its name suggests, the new series is more adult-oriented than the original, and features an explicitly homosexual relationship between the main characters, strong profanity, graphic violence and nudity.

Billy West refused to participate in Adult Party Cartoon, because he did not find the show funny and felt that it would've damaged his career. Eric Bauza subsequently replaced West as the voice of Stimpy in the series, while Kricfalusi reprised his roles as both Ren and Mr. Horse. The series premiered with the banned Nickelodeon episode "Man's Best Friend", before debuting new episodes thereafter. Much like the original series, Kricfalusi showed apparent disregard for meeting production deadlines, with only three out of the ordered nine episodes being completed on time. After the first three episodes aired, Spike's entire animation block was removed from its programming schedule. However, three more episodes, already in production and completed by the time Adult Party Cartoon was canceled, were subsequently released three years later in 2006 on the Ren & Stimpy: The Lost Episodes DVD.

=== Canceled Nickelodeon-related projects ===
In February 2016, Deadline Hollywood reported that characters from Ren & Stimpy were scheduled to appear in a scrapped Nicktoons feature-length film. Three months later, Variety reported that Nickelodeon was in negotiations with Kricfalusi about another revival of the characters. Bob Camp and William Wray revealed in an April 2016 panel discussion that Kricfalusi was developing a new Ren & Stimpy short that would be shown in theaters with the third SpongeBob SquarePants film, but stated that they were "not invited to that party" and would not be involved with the short's production. However, Kricfalusi later denied making such a cartoon on Twitter. Despite this, an animatic of the short that was originally made as a promotion for The SpongeBob Movie: Sponge Out of Water before being cancelled was released as a bonus feature on the Cans Without Labels DVD in May 2019.

=== Comedy Central reboot ===
On August 5, 2020, it was announced that a new Ren & Stimpy reboot has been greenlit by Comedy Central, along with Daria and Beavis and Butt-Head. Though a new creative staff has been employed, Billy West was expected to return along with a few of the original series' writers. Due to the sexual abuse allegations surrounding him, it has been confirmed that Kricfalusi will not be involved in the production of the new reboot, nor will he receive any compensation from it. Originally set to be produced by Nickelodeon Animation Studio, production on the reboot has been moved to Awesome Inc in October 2021, while Snipple Animation announced their involvement in September 2022. According to West, development was postponed due to the COVID-19 pandemic in the United States, contrary to earlier rumors that the project had been canceled. Paramount Global (at the time operating as ViacomCBS), the parent company of Comedy Central and Nickelodeon, has not responded to requests for a comment about the status of the show, though West reiterated that it was still in production. On September 14, 2021, West confirmed that he was reprising his roles as Ren and Stimpy.

Other returning crew members from the original series include Bob Jaques, Chris Sauvé and former Spümcø alumni Robyn Byrd, who previously advocated to get the reboot canceled.

== Home media ==
=== VHS, LaserDisc and UMD ===
Sony Wonder initially released collections of episodes of The Ren & Stimpy Show on VHS, which were not grouped by air dates or season. For instance, The Classics Volume 1 VHS was released in 1993 and included three episodes from Season 1 ("Space Madness", "Untamed World" and "Stimpy's Invention"), as well as the short segment "Breakfast Tips" and a "Log" commercial. Other Nickelodeon compilation tapes, including two themed after the SNICK programming block, were also released containing individual Ren and Stimpy cartoons.

Perhaps because of the show's adult following, it was also granted a LaserDisc set (the only ever LaserDisc release from Sony Wonder, and one of the only few LaserDiscs of a Nickelodeon original series), The Ren & Stimpy Show -- The Essential Collection: Classics I & II, was released in 1995. This included all the episodes previously released on VHS from the Classics I and Classics II volumes, as well as the shorts included on said VHS releases.

In 1997, over a year after Nickelodeon terminated its distribution deal with Sony Wonder, Paramount Home Video only re-released one The Ren & Stimpy Show VHS tape previously released by Sony Wonder: "Have Yourself a Stinky Little Christmas," itself originally released in 1993.

In 2005, Paramount released The First Ten Cartoons on UMD, only for playback on Sony's PSP portable video game system. Presumably due to poor sales of UMD product, no further collections were released on the format.

=== DVD ===
==== United States ====
Time Life released several episodes of The Ren & Stimpy Show in a "Best of" set in September 2003. This set is now out of print. On October 12, 2004, Paramount Home Entertainment released the first two complete seasons in a three-disc box set; although the cover art and press materials said the episodes were "uncut", a handful of episodes were edited, due to the use of Spike TV masters where Spike TV would cut some scenes from episodes to make room for longer commercial breaks. One of the episodes from the second season, "Svën Höek", did have footage reinserted from a work-in-progress VHS tape, but with an editing machine timecode visible on-screen; the scene was later restored by fans. Three other episodes ("Powdered Toast Man", "Dog Show", and "Big House Blues") contain extra footage that was not originally broadcast on Nickelodeon. The DVD set even includes the banned episode "Man's Best Friend" as a bonus feature. A set for "Seasons Three and a Half-ish", containing all of season three and the first half of season four up to "It's a Dog's Life/Egg Yölkeo", followed on June 28, 2005. Season Five and Some More of Four completed the DVD release of the Nickelodeon series on September 20. Like the previous DVDs, some scenes were removed in these releases.

A two-disc set dubbed The Lost Episodes was released on July 17, 2006, featuring both the aired and unaired episodes from Ren & Stimpy "Adult Party Cartoon".

Paramount released "The Almost Complete Series" 9-disc set that combines the individual season discs into a single package, on February 6, 2018, and was re-released on January 11, 2022.

==== Europe ====
The original series was released entirely as a 9-disc set in Germany on October 4, 2013. After people said that two episodes on the second disc were not completely uncensored, Turbine Classics offered to send everybody proof of purchase of an uncensored disc. The set comprises a mix of the known US airings and the German TV airings which included some exclusive scenes of various episodes. Since the set is the first to include all scenes ever broadcast worldwide, it is considered the first truly uncensored DVD release of the series.

== Other media ==
=== Video games ===
Seven action games based directly on the television series were released between 1992 and 1995.

- The Ren & Stimpy Show: Space Cadet Adventures was developed by Imagineering, published by THQ and released for the Game Boy in November 1992. The game's premise centers on Stimpy attempting to rescue a stranded Ren, who is simultaneously traversing alien worlds attempting to return to their ship. The game received middling reviews and was praised for its faithful humor and visuals but was criticized for its repetitive and unimaginative gameplay.
- The Ren & Stimpy Show: Veediots! was developed by Gray Matter, published by THQ and released for the Super Nintendo Entertainment System and Game Boy in October 1993. The game is composed of four stages based on episodes from the television series. Both versions of the game received middling reviews. The SNES version was praised for its faithful visuals and audio but was criticized for its repetitive stages, standard gameplay and sluggish controls. Nintendo Power commented that the Game Boy version had good graphics but poor controls and challenge.
- Quest for the Shaven Yak Starring Ren Hoëk & Stimpy was developed by Realtime Associates, published by Sega and released for the Game Gear in November 1993. It was also released for the Master System in Brazil in 1995. The game's premise centers on Ren and Stimpy's mission to return the hooves of the Great Shaven Yak. Scary Larry of GamePro praised the music as "worth the price of admission" and the graphics as "very good by Game Gear standards".
- The Ren & Stimpy Show: Buckeroo$! was developed by Imagineering, published by THQ, and released for the Nintendo Entertainment System in November 1993, and for the SNES in April 1995. The game features twelve levels based on the television episodes "Space Madness", "Out West", and "Robin Höek". Nintendo Power's review noted that the NES version's graphics "capture the artistic flavor of the cartoon series" but criticized the poor controls and unengaging game elements. Conversely, the SNES version was commended for having more gameplay variety than previous Ren & Stimpy titles, but the graphics were described as "[not] very Ren & Stimpyish".
- The Ren & Stimpy Show Presents: Stimpy's Invention was developed by BlueSky Software, published by Sega and released for the Sega Genesis in December 1993. The game's premise follows Ren and Stimpy as they travel through their neighborhood and collect scattered pieces of Stimpy's latest invention, the Mutate-O-Matic. The game features a two-player mode in which each player controls one of the two titular characters. The reviewers of Electronic Gaming Monthly praised the game's faithful and humorous visuals and audio but derided the two-player mode as "more aggravating than fun" and "twice as hard as a one-player [game]".
- The Ren & Stimpy Show: Fire Dogs was developed by Argonaut Software, published by THQ, and released for the SNES in March 1994. The game is split into two distinct parts; in the first part, the player controls Stimpy, who must traverse through a firehouse and gather all the equipment for a firetruck in a limited time while avoiding the Fire Chief, while the second part puts the player in control of both Ren and Stimpy, who must catch items that are thrown out of a burning building. Nintendo Power commended the game's graphics, humor, audio, and inclusion of a password feature but criticized the lack of variety, limited time allotted for collecting items, and repetition of the two levels.
- The Ren & Stimpy Show: Time Warp was developed by Sculptured Software, published by THQ, and released for the SNES in October 1994. The game's premise centers on Ren and Stimpy's efforts to navigate through time and stop Muddy Mudskipper from ruining history. The reviewers of Electronic Gaming Monthly praised the game's animations and various attacks but stated that the controls "could be tweaked up a little more". Next Generation reviewed the game, rating it one star out of five, and stated that "When Nickelodeon fired creator John Kricfalusi, the heart, and soul were sucked out of the pair. This game puts the final nail in the coffin."

Aside from these dedicated titles, Ren, Stimpy, and other characters from the series make appearances in the Nickelodeon 3D Movie Maker, Nicktoons Racing, Nicktoons: Attack of the Toybots, Nicktoons MLB, Nickelodeon Kart Racers 2: Grand Prix, Nickelodeon All-Star Brawl, Nickelodeon Kart Racers 3: Slime Speedway, and Nickelodeon All-Star Brawl 2. In a February 1993 article, a Ren & Stimpy game developed by Acclaim Entertainment was planned for the Atari Lynx but never released.

=== Comic books ===
Marvel Comics optioned the rights to produce comic books based on Nickelodeon properties in 1992. The initial plan was to have an anthology comic featuring several Nicktoons properties. Marvel produced 44 issues of the ongoing series, along with several specials under the Marvel Absurd imprint. Most of these were written by comic scribe Dan Slott.

One Ren & Stimpy special #3, Masters of Time and Space, was set up as a "Choose Your Adventure" and with a time travel plot, took Slott six months to plot out in his spare time. It was designed so that it was possible to choose a path that would eventually be 20 pages longer than the comic itself. Issue #6 of the series starred Spider-Man battling Powdered Toast Man.

The editors named the "Letters to the Editor" section "Ask Dr. Stupid", and at least one letter in every column would be a direct question for Dr. Stupid to answer. This comic series lasted from December 1992 – July 1996.

=== Cancelled film adaptation ===
In May 1993, Nickelodeon and 20th Century Fox signed a two-year production deal for the development and production of both animated and live-action feature-length films based on their new or existing properties; Ren & Stimpy was mentioned as a possible property for development, alongside Rugrats and Doug. However, the show's "cynical and gross humor" was a poor fit for a conventional, "warm and fuzzy" family film. After the deal expired with no films produced, Nickelodeon later started its own film studio after parent company Viacom purchased Paramount Pictures, which would distribute Nickelodeon's films instead of Fox, with only Rugrats and Doug having their films made (Rugrats released its own film in 1998, while Doug, already moved to Disney with its own show on ABC, having a separate film of its own under the Walt Disney Pictures banner in 1999, leaving Ren & Stimpy to have no film adaptation of its own at all).
