= Happy Happy Joy Joy: The Ren and Stimpy Story =

2020 American documentary film

- Film poster
- Directed by: Ron Ciciero; Kimo Easterwood
- Written by: Ron Cicero
- Produced by: Ron Ciciero; Kimo Easterwood
- Cinematography: Kimo Easterwood
- Edited by: Christina Burchard; Ron Cicero; Kimo Easterwood; Sean Jarrett; Kevin Klauber
- Production companies: Ladies & Gentlemen, Inc
- Distributed by: Gravitas Ventures
- Release dates: January 28, 2020 (Sundance Film Festival); February 21, 2020 (Big Sky Documentary Film Festival); April 11, 2020 (San Francisco International Film Festival); August 14, 2020
- Running time: 104 minutes
- Country: United States
- Language: English

Happy Happy Joy Joy: The Ren and Stimpy Story is a 2020 American documentary film, directed and produced by Ron Cicero and Kimo Easterwood. The film examines the history of Nickelodeon's The Ren & Stimpy Show, as well as the career of series creator John Kricfalusi. Its title was taken from a quote of Stimpy's. It had its world premiere at the Sundance Film Festival on January 24, 2020, and was released on April 16, 2022, on True Story.

The documentary is dedicated to animator Chris Reccardi and the documentary's producer Peter Wade, both of whom died during its production. The film received positive reviews from critics, who considered it to be a competent and informational documentary, but felt that it suffered greatly from an inability to properly address Kricfalusi's sexual abuse allegations stemming when the film was near-completion.

== Cast ==
- Matt Kennedy
- Scott Webb
- Vincent Waller (credited as "Victor" Waller)
- J. J. Sedelmaier
- Elinor Blake
- Tom Minton
- Lynne Naylor
- Bobby Lee
- Iliza Shlesinger
- Chris Gore
- Jim Ballantine
- Bob Camp
- Chris Reccardi (posthumously)
- Richard Pursel
- John Kricfalusi
- Doug Lawrence
- Carey Yost
- Chris Prynoski
- Todd White
- Teale Reon Wang
- Libby Simon
- Bob Jaques
- Vanessa Coffey
- Scott Wills
- Billy West
- David Konigsberg
- Jim Gomez
- Jim Smith
- Ed Bell
- Stephen DeStefano
- Timothy J. Borquez
- Bill Wray
- Will McRobb
- Joe Orrantia
- Mitchell Kriegman
- Eddie Fitzgerald
- Mike Fontanelli
- Jack Black
- Scotty Printz
- Christine Danzo
- Robyn Byrd
- David Silverman

== Critical reception ==
On the review aggregator website Rotten Tomatoes, 82% of 33 critics' reviews are positive. The website's consensus reads: "Despite glossing over some of the darker events in the subject's life, Happy Happy Joy Joy: The Ren & Stimpy Story is an engaging look at a groundbreaking show."

Andrew Pulver for The Guardian wrote: "Here is a documentary whose title contains radioactive levels of irony: Happiness and joy are very far from what is to be found within." Pulver wrote that the film seems to have been intended as "a warts-and-all account of Kricfalusi's eccentric (to say the least) management style, which culminated in his firing by Nickelodeon in 1992", but was upended in 2018 when the film was almost finished by the revelation that Kricfalusi had engaged in the 1990s in sexual relationships with two teenage girls who were both ardent fans of The Ren & Stimpy Show, and that both of the women feel he took advantage of them. Pulver wrote that Kricfalusi started out as being portrayed in the documentary as a lovable "mad genius" determined to make The Ren & Stimpy Show in his own idiosyncratic style, but gradually came across as a "nasty" and "damaged" character. Pulver called it an unbalanced final film as the documentary ended with Kricfalusi issuing an apology for his relationships with the two women while they were teenagers, which gave the impression that the matter was closed, which was certainly not the case with the two women concerned. Pulver ended his review by writing that the documentary was a "dismal coda to a fondly-remembered show".

Nick Schager wrote: "Creation and destruction, brilliance and monstrousness, are hopelessly entangled in the saga of The Ren & Stimpy Show, Nickelodeon's early-'90s animated series that skyrocketed to instant influential fame and then flamed out after the contentious departure of its mastermind, John Kricfalusi...yet in recounting how it came to revolutionize television animation, it also functions as a portrait of auteurism, in all its glory and terror. That's because Ren, the psychotic chihuahua with a violent streak, and Stimpy, his 'abject retard with a good heart' feline companion, were both born from Kricfalusi’s life, with Ren modeled after Kricfalusi himself and Stimpy based on his long-time girlfriend and partner Lynne Naylor." Schager wrote the most disturbing aspect of Happy Happy Joy Joy was the revelation that Kricfalusi "disgustedly" used his fame to have sex with Robyn Byrd, a starry-eyed 14-year old fan, interviewed in the film. Schager wrote the film did not seek to answer the question of how to separate the art from the artist, noting The Ren & Stimpy Show was a product of Kricfalusi's obsessions such as his rage over his upbringing by his authoritarian father in his native Canada, which given the most recent revelations poses a very difficult question. Schager argued that the best way to sever The Ren & Stimpy Show from Kricfalusi was in understanding that the animation of The Ren & Stimpy Show was a collective and collaborative process that involved the entire staff of the Spümcø-studio, not just Kricfalusi. Schager concluded: "What made Kricfalusi great was also what made him awful, and though he comes across as a candid and cartoonish figure in Happy Happy Joy Joy - still bursting with screwy, growly passion - what lingers longest is his admission that he wouldn’t change any significant aspect of the behavior that brought him down. Like all Shakespearean protagonists, he remains a larger-than-life figure doomed by fatal flaws."

Gary Kramer wrote in his review that "Happy Happy Joy Joy is a cautionary tale, not a hagiography. Nevertheless, it ultimately leaves a bad taste in one's mouth". Kramer wrote that the film initially presented Kricfalusi in a sympathetic light, portraying him as a talented cartoonist who successfully defied the network executives to bring to life his own uniquely idiosyncratic television show in 1991 that become an instant hit. However, Kramer noted there were troubling signs as Happy Happy Joy Joy continued such as Kricfalusi's confession that the abusive master of the titular duo George Liquor was based on his father, Ren on himself and Stimpy on his girlfriend Lynne Naylor. Kramer wrote that the way the characters were based on real people said much about: "...Kricfalusi's megalomania and thoughts about women. Stimpy seems to love Ren no matter how much he is slapped around and abused. Their codependent relationship is obviously steeped in painful truth." Kramer wrote the picture of the Spümcø studio that Kricfalusi founded as a cult-like institution was deeply troubling. Kramer wrote that the portrayal the documentary presented of Kricfalusi was as an abusive boss who had an obsessive perfectionist style when it came to drawing cartoons and a colossal ego as he openly disregarded the network's concerns about budgets and deadlines. Kramer wrote that Kricfalusi's relationships with two teenage female fans, Robyn Byrd and Katie Rice, was "creepy" and his apology to them sounded "hollow". Kramer concluded that the documentary revealed how the success of The Ren & Stimpy Show brought out the worse in Kricfalusi and led to his downfall.

Denis Harvey wrote that Happy Happy Joy Joy was: "A very entertaining recap that grows more disturbing as it wades into the dysfunctional behavior that doomed the show, and still somewhat taints its legacy." Harvey wrote that the film debunked the idea of Kricfalusi being an auteur, as all his post-Ren & Stimpy Show work do not achieve the same level of competence with their offensive content, suggesting that he needed Nickelodeon executives including Vanessa Coffey to temper what he called Kricfalusi's self-evident streak of nastiness and produce truly great content. Harvey cited the negative reaction to Ren & Stimpy "Adult Party Cartoon", that was cancelled after only three episodes, to be the prime example. Harvey wrote that: "Happy Happy Joy Joy is both an homage to an inspired endeavor and a cautionary tale illustrating how even the greatest popular success can be brought down by unchecked ego, perfectionism and “artistic temperament” at the top." Harvey expressed his appreciation for the staff of Spümcø studio who created a TV show whose: "...crazed absurdism, combined with a striking hand-drawn visual style, also made for an immediate ratings hit and object of faddish obsession. Kricfalusi's gifted staff were gratified to be working on something so cutting-edge, even at the cost of enduring extremely long hours and a somewhat tyrannical, abusive boss." Harvey concluded that Happy Happy Joy Joy was "appropriately slick and punchy."

Brian Tallerico of RogerEbert.com argued that the success of The Ren & Stimpy Show in 1991-1992 utterly changed the American animation industry forever and made possible the more adult-oriented and edgy cartoons that have become common since the 1990s. Tallerico wrote:" When it comes to modern animation, few people are as important as those who made Ren & Stimpy, and the first half of Happy Happy Joy Joy captures what made these artists so special." Tallerico expressed much sympathy for the animators of the Spümcø studio who had to endure what he called Kricfalusi's "downright insane behavior" that was chronicled in Happy Happy Joy Joy. Tallerico called Kricfalusi a sexual "predator" and felt that the account of his "disturbing behavior with young women" came too late in the film." Tallerico argued that the most troubling question raised by the film was: "Can great art be created by a monster?"

In his review, the American critic A.A. Dowd wrote that much of the documentary consisted of interviews with various people involved in one way or another with The Ren & Stimpy Show and that those interviewed presented: "...Kricfalusi as an uncompromising control-freak, a demanding boss, and an artist with some rather serious anti-social tendencies. All of that, of course, has been wrapped up in the creator's whole outsider-cool, rock-star mystique since the early '90s, when he turned the episodic adventures of a short-tempered Chihuahua and his sweetly moronic feline companion into the highest rated show on cable television." Dowd wrote that the story about how Kricfalusi was fired from own television show on 24 September 1992 is well known, but that it was interesting to have an insiders' perspective on the process that led to Kricfalusi's ouster. Dowd argued that the way the documentary presented Coffey, who made the decision to fire Kricfalusi, should offer "a rejoinder to the general notion of Nickelodeon as little more than an impediment to the animator's daring vision." Dowd wrote: "The film is actually perhaps most interesting—and most valuable to the initiated—as a piece of criticism-by-creator. Kricfalusi and his team (including Bob Camp, who eventually took over the show after Kricfalusi's termination) are keenly aware of what made Ren & Stimpy so special, in all its demented glory—not just the beautifully repulsive animation, not just its push against the boundaries of good taste and kiddie-entertainment formula, but also its unprecedented emotional intensity." Dowd concluded his review that the film was too soft in its look at Kricfalusi's relationships with his female teenage fans as he felt that filmmakers did not seriously examine the corporate culture at the Spümcø studio, where Kricfalusi's relationships with teenage girls were well known. Dowd accused the filmmakers of having presented "a romantic notion of Kricfalusi as a tortured underground artist too edgy for the system—the very kind of self-mythologizing he used to lure teenage girls into his orbit".

== See also ==
- "Stimpy's Cartoon Show" – an episode of the series written by Kricfalusi to satirize the production of the series, which ended up satirizing his abusive role after changes were made due to his firing
- Quiet on Set: The Dark Side of Kids TV – a 2024 documentary television series about Dan Schneider's tenure on Nickelodeon, featuring testimonials from former actors and crewmembers.
