= List of The Powerpuff Girls episodes =

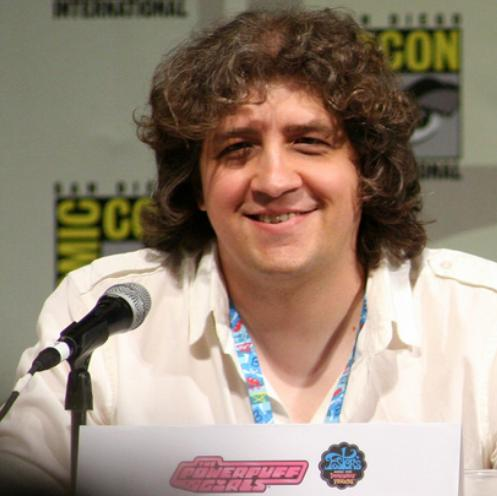
Craig McCracken created the series as a CalArts student and directed the first four seasons.

The Powerpuff Girls is an American animated television series created by Craig McCracken for Cartoon Network. The series began as a student film called Whoopass Stew, made by McCracken while he attended the California Institute of the Arts in 1992. Two additional shorts, "Meat Fuzzy Lumpkins" and "Crime 101", later aired on Cartoon Network's World Premiere Toons in 1995 and 1996. The series officially premiered on November 18, 1998, lasting 6 seasons with 78 episodes total. A feature film, a Christmas special, and a 10th anniversary special were produced for the series.

Episodes of The Powerpuff Girls have seen numerous VHS and DVD releases as well. The musical episode "See Me, Feel Me, Gnomey" was never aired in the United States, but was broadcast on YTV in Canada in 2004–2005 as well as in other countries (including Japan), and is included on the complete series DVD box set.

== Series overview ==
Season	Segments	Episodes	Originally released	
Season	Segments	Episodes	First released	Last released
1	24	13	November 18, 1998	May 26, 1999
2	26	13	June 25, 1999	June 30, 2000
3	22	12	July 28, 2000	February 9, 2001
4	12	11	April 14, 2001	May 18, 2002
5	25	14	December 6, 2002	April 9, 2004
6	27	15	April 16, 2004	March 25, 2005
Specials	N/A	3	December 12, 2003	January 20, 2014

== Episodes ==
=== Whoopass Stew ===
Craig McCracken made a short titled "Whoopass Stew! The Whoopass Girls in: A Sticky Situation" as a student at the California Institute of the Arts. Four shorts were intended, though only the first one was finished. The other three were presented on the Complete Series DVD set accompanied by the original storyboards and their original audio. McCracken submitted "A Sticky Situation" to Cartoon Network, and some time later the name "Whoopass Stew!" was changed to "The Powerpuff Girls".

No.	Title	Original release date
Pilot	"A Sticky Situation"	1994 (only for the festivals)
Begins with the same opening sequence as the series, except that the Professor accidentally adds a can of whoopass rather than Chemical X. The Whoopass Girls fight the Amoeba Boys, get stuck to them, and have to fly them into the sun to beat them. This short was only shown in animation conventions and was never aired publicly on television due to the suggestive word, "Whoopass", and other inappropriate themes.

=== What a Cartoon! shorts ===
Both shorts are written and directed by Craig McCracken, with Genndy Tartakovsky as animation director, Paul Rudish as art director and Mike Moon as layout designer.

No.	Title	Original release date
1	"Meat Fuzzy Lumpkins"	February 20, 1995 (World Premiere Toon-In)
When Fuzzy Lumpkins loses a jam contest, he creates a meat ray gun that turns anything into raw, butchered meat, leaving it up to the Powerpuff Girls to save the day before everyone and everything in Townsville is turned into a butcher shop.
2	"Crime 101"	January 28, 1996
When the Amoeba Boys fail at being real bad guys, The Powerpuff Girls teach them how to be bad by robbing a bank. They get a lesson in criminal justice when they get arrested.

=== Season 1 (1998–99) ===
Series creator Craig McCracken directs every episode alongside co-directors. Craig Kellman serves as art director of each episode.

No. overall	No. in season	Title	Directed by	Storyboarded by	Original release date	Prod. code
1	1	"Monkey See, Doggie Do"	Genndy Tartakovsky	Don Shank	November 18, 1998	102
1	1	"Mommy Fearest"	John McIntyre	Chris Savino	November 18, 1998	102
Mojo Jojo steals a magical Anubis dog head and unleashes a curse that turns everyone into dogs, including the Powerpuff Girls, but the three sniff out a solution and show Mojo Jojo that their bite is worse than his bark. The girls find something uneasy about the Professor's new girlfriend Ima Goodlady. It turns out that she is not such a good lady after all, she is really the sinister Sedusa, who gets the girls grounded so she can commit crimes around Townsville without interference.: In airing order, this is the series premiere.
2	2	"Insect Inside"	Genndy Tartakovsky	Craig McCracken	November 25, 1998	101
2	2	"Powerpuff Bluff"	Genndy Tartakovsky	Cindy Banks	November 25, 1998	101
Vile villain Roach Coach plots to infest Townsville with his army of cockroaches. The girls must fight their fear of bugs in order to squash Roach Coach's scheme and force him to bug off. Three escaped convicts, repeatedly beaten by the girls, fashion themselves new identities when they find grown-up-sized Powerpuff Girls costumes inside Townsville Jail. Using their pseudo-superhero status, they glamour civilians of money and jewellery while the Mayor mistakenly calls the police and has the real Powerpuff Girls thrown into prison. The girls now have to clear their names and as usual, save the day.: In production order, this is the series premiere.
3	3	"Octi Evil"	Genndy Tartakovsky	Kevin Kaliher	December 2, 1998	103
3	3	"Geshundfight"	Genndy Tartakovsky	Dan Krall	December 2, 1998	103
The heinous Him toys with Bubbles' mind by speaking to her through Octi, her favorite stuffed animal. Following its instruction, Bubbles provokes a fight between her sisters that prompts the Professor to issue a time-out until the girls can make amends and make squid-meat out of the now giant, Him-controlled Octi. The Amoeba Boys' ill-conceived plan to stand in front of the "Keep off the Grass" sign at Townsville Park all night in the rain leaves them with a terrible virus. When they infect the Townsville population, it's up to the girls to find the antidote.
4	4	"Buttercrush"	Genndy Tartakovsky	David Smith	December 9, 1998	104
4	4	"Fuzzy Logic"	Genndy Tartakovsky	Mike Stern	December 9, 1998	104
Buttercup develops a crush on Ace, the leader of the Ganggreen Gang. However, when the gang exploits her infatuation and lures Blossom and Bubbles into danger, Buttercup quickly comes to her sisters' rescue and shows the boys the real meaning of the word "crush." The beastly bumpkin Fuzzy Lumpkins goes wild in Townsville and only the Powerpuff Girls, with some help from a flying squirrel, can teach him to respect other people's property.
5	5	"Boogie Frights"	Genndy Tartakovsky	Paul Rudish	December 16, 1998	105
5	5	"Abracadaver"	John McIntyre	John McIntyre	December 16, 1998	105
Bubbles must face her fear of the Boogie Man after he blocks out the sun and allows his monster friends to party all the time. Al Lusion, the old-time Townsville magician, pulls off his greatest magical stunt when he comes back from the dead as the zombie Abracadaver. Luckily, Blossom also has a special trick up her sleeve.
6	6	"Telephonies"	Genndy Tartakovsky	Clayton Morrow	December 23, 1998	106
6	6	"Tough Love"	Genndy Tartakovsky	Chris Savino	December 23, 1998	106
The Ganggreen Gang gets hold of the Mayor's hotline to the Powerpuff Girls and makes prank calls, sending the Girls on a wild goose chase all over town. However, when it's the notorious villains Mojo Jojo, Fuzzy, and Him that the gang disturbs, they learn the price of making prank calls. Everyone in Townsville loves the Powerpuff Girls, but the citizens have a sudden change of heart when Him sends out an evil gas that turns the entire town against their favorite superheroines. The Girls must fight the ones they love to get them back to normal.
7	7	"Major Competition"	Genndy Tartakovsky	Cindy Morrow	January 6, 1999	107
7	7	"Mr. Mojo's Rising"	Genndy Tartakovsky	Rob Renzetti	January 6, 1999	107
There's a new man in town: Major Man, an impossibly perfect superhero who cuts in on the Girls' turf. Unfortunately, Major Man isn't as perfect as he is supposed to be as the girls soon discover, as he sets up his own disasters so he can "save the day", and come up with an idea to make Major Man reveal the fraud that he is in the midst of a monster attack, that the girls set up by hiring the monster to help them expose Major Man. When Mojo Jojo kidnaps the Professor, it's a blast from the past—a blast of Chemical X, that is. After Mojo Jojo reveals he was once the Professor's "beloved" assistant, the Professor is coerced into giving Mojo the same superpowers as the Girls. However, once empowered, the true evolution of this super-villain chimp comes to light, a fact Mojo Jojo will certainly regret: he caused Professor to add Chemical X to the perfect little girl formula, thus creating the Powerpuff Girls.
8	8	"Paste Makes Waste"	Genndy Tartakovsky	Don Shank	January 13, 1999	108
8	8	"Ice Sore"	John McIntyre	Kevin Kaliher	January 13, 1999	108
Buttercup teases paste-eating classmate Elmer. When a fly with atomic chemicals enters into the paste, Elmer turns into a destructive Paste Monster. Buttercup has to get out of a sticky situation by doing something against her tough nature: apologizing. During a heat wave, Blossom discovers that she has a new power: ice breath, but when she doesn't use her new gift wisely, she gets a chilly reception from her sisters until a fireball aims at Townsville, affecting her decision in using the new power.
9	9	"Bubblevicious"	Genndy Tartakovsky	Michael Stern	January 20, 1999	109
9	9	"The Bare Facts"	John McIntyre	Cindy Morrow	January 20, 1999	109
Bubbles is tired of people dismissing her as more sugar than spice, especially the Professor and her sisters, who treat her like a baby. When she sets out to prove she is hardcore, she takes everyone by surprise, even Mojo Jojo. Shown entirely from the Mayor's point-of-view, after Mojo Jojo kidnaps and blindfolds him, and after the Girls save him, the Mayor has to rely on the Girls' very different individual accounts of the crime to figure out exactly what happened. However, he's more concerned with knowing why the girls keep giggling at him; it is revealed at the end that his clothes were stolen.
10	10	"Cat Man Do"	Genndy Tartakovsky	David Smith	January 27, 1999	110
10	10	"Impeach Fuzz"	John McIntyre	John McIntyre & Chris Savino	January 27, 1999	110
Bubbles saves a seemingly innocent little cat from the clutches of an evil villain, but when the girls discover it's actually the cat who is evil, they must save the Professor from becoming the "purr-fect" victim. When Fuzzy Lumpkins throws his hat into the mayoral ring and claims a surprise victory, it's up to the Mayor to wrestle the office (and the Mayor's actual hat) back from him.
11	11	"Just Another Manic Mojo"	Genndy Tartakovsky	Genndy Tartakovsky	February 3, 1999	111
11	11	"Mime for a Change"	Genndy Tartakovsky	David Smith	February 3, 1999	111
After the Powerpuff Girls lose their baseball in Mojo Jojo's window, it seems to offer the evil villain the perfect opportunity to destroy the pesky superheroes. Unfortunately, he gets more than he bargained for when the Girls treat it like a visit to his house, just to cause trouble over a baseball. An accidental bleach spill turns Rainbow the Clown into the malevolent Mr. Mime, and he proceeds to eliminate Townsville of its color, sound, and movement. But before he knows it, the Girls sabotage his plan for a colorless world with the song "Love Makes the World Go 'Round", with Bubbles on drums and vocals, Buttercup on electric bass guitar and vocals, and Blossom on electric lead guitar and vocals.
12	12	"The Rowdyruff Boys"	Genndy Tartakovsky	Paul Rudish & Clayton Morrow	April 7, 1999	112
Mojo Jojo creates the ultimate weapons against the Powerpuff Girls. They're Brick, Boomer, and Butch: The Rowdyruff Boys, male equivalents of The Powerpuff Girls. When regular fighting does not work against the Boys, the Girls have to use their feminine wiles to seal a victory.
13	13	"Uh Oh Dynamo"	Genndy Tartakovsky	Don Shank	May 26, 1999	113
Worried about the Girls' safety after witnessing their fight against an Eye Fish Balloon Monster, the Professor creates Powerpuff Dynamo, a state-of-the-art giant robot, to help them in battle. Yet, Blossom, Bubbles, and Buttercup have no reason in using Dynamo in dealing with regular emergencies. But when the Giant Fish Balloon Monster outmatches the Powerpuff Girls, the Professor forces the Girls to use Dynamo, and Townsville is soon in the middle of a huge showdown between the Dynamo and the Giant Fish Balloon Monster.

=== Season 2 (1999–2000) ===
Craig McCracken directs every episode alongside co-directors.

No. overall	No. in season	Title	Directed by	Storyboarded by	Art directed by	Original release date	Prod. code
14	1	"Stuck Up, Up and Away"	John McIntyre	Paul Rudish	Craig Kellman	June 25, 1999	201
14	1	"Schoolhouse Rocked"	John McIntyre	Cindy Morrow	Craig Kellman	June 25, 1999	201
The new girl in school, Princess Morbucks, wants to be a Powerpuff Girl after discovering they have superpowers, one thing she doesn't have. However, when Princess is denied the opportunity to join the Girls because of her spoiled and bratty behavior, they make a very snobbish new enemy, intent on destroying them. The Ganggreen Gang run into a truant officer named Jack Wednesday who sends them back to school. Unfortunately, that school is Pokey Oaks, where the Powerpuff Girls attend and where a no-fighting rule means the Girls can do little to stop the Ganggreen Gang from taking over the playground without breaking the rules.
15	2	"Collect Her"	John McIntyre	Chris Savino	Craig Kellman	August 6, 1999	202
15	2	"Supper Villain"	Genndy Tartakovsky	David Smith	Craig Kellman	August 6, 1999	202
A comic book geek named Lenny Baxter goes too far to complete his superhero collection when he traps the girls inside his power packages. Now, it's up to the people of Townsville to save the day. The Powerpuff Girls' new next door neighbors, the Smiths, seem very nice and average—until the patriarch Harold reveals his ill-fated aspiration of becoming a super villain, and takes the Professor hostage.
16	3	"Birthday Bash"	Genndy Tartakovsky	Clayton Morrow	Craig Kellman	August 20, 1999	203
16	3	"Too Pooped to Puff"	Randy Myers	Cindy Morrow	Craig Kellman & Don Shank	August 20, 1999	203
While in prison, Mojo Jojo, Princess Morbucks, and the Amoeba Boys all come up with plans to destroy the Girls at their television-covered birthday party. Later on, Him tries a plan of his own, using the pinata featured at the party. When Townsville begins taking the Powerpuff Girls for granted over little things, the Girls vow not to get involved until Townsville starts taking care of themselves. Therefore, when a monster attacks the town, the Girls decide to stay put on a cloud, trying to teach the townspeople how to beat the monster themselves.
17	4	"Beat Your Greens"	Randy Myers	Paul Rudish	Craig Kellman & Don Shank	September 10, 1999	204
17	4	"Down n' Dirty"	John McIntyre	Charlie Bean	Craig Kellman & Don Shank	September 10, 1999	204
Broccoli aliens land in Townsville with a plan to harvest all the Earth's vegetables, and the only way to beat the broccoli is to eat it. The Girls are able to defeat their most detested side dish with help from other kids in town. Buttercup fails to see the reason why she should bathe each day when the time in the bathtub could be better spent fighting more bad guys. Nevertheless, Buttercup soon learns the hard way that personal hygiene is more important when she finds criminals (and monsters) hard to come by while the Mayor and the townspeople also add pressure to her decisions.
18	5	"Dream Scheme"	John McIntyre	Chris Savino	Craig Kellman & Don Shank	September 24, 1999	205
18	5	"You Snooze You Lose"	John McIntyre	Lynne Naylor	Craig Kellman & Don Shank	September 24, 1999	205
The Sandman wants to get some sleep, but can't as long as half the world is awake at any given time, so he builds a machine that will sprinkle the world with his sand and put everyone to sleep, leaving it to the Powerpuff Girls to fight the Sandman in his dreams to make him wake up. When Mojo Jojo loses his most evil plan ever, it falls into the clutches of the inept Amoeba Boys, who cannot make heads or tails of it. The Powerpuff Girls agree to help the simple-minded Amoebas with what they think is a scavenger hunt.
19	6	"Slave the Day"	Genndy Tartakovsky	Genndy Tartakovsky	Craig Kellman & Don Shank	October 8, 1999	206
19	6	"Los Dos Mojos"	Genndy Tartakovsky	Chris Savino	Craig Kellman & Don Shank	October 8, 1999	206
After being saved from a rushing train by the Girls, Big Billy defects from the Ganggreen Gang and pledges his loyalty to the Girls. Unfortunately, this leads to him getting in the way of their crime fighting. When Bubbles gets hit on the head and knocked out unconscious in battle, she wakes up with amnesia and believes that she is Mojo Jojo. Blossom and Buttercup try to help get her memory back, to no avail, until the real Mojo is able to knock some sense back to Bubbles with a construction bar.
20	7	"A Very Special Blossom"	Randy Myers	Lou Romano	Craig Kellman & Don Shank	November 26, 1999	207
20	7	"Daylight Savings"	John McIntyre	Chris Savino	Don Shank	November 26, 1999	207
After a big battle, Blossom discovers the perfect (and otherwise impossibly priced) Father's Day gift for the Professor among the rubble, leading to feelings of guilt and suspicion of theft from Bubbles and Buttercup. When Professor gets arrested, Blossom realizes she must confess after failing to convince them that Mojo did the stealing. When the Girls' school work suffers from their late night crimefighting, Ms. Keane convinces the Professor that they need a curfew, which is good news for the villains of Townsville until the Professor watches the Clock channel, where he learns that the first night of the new curfew has coincided with daylight savings time.
21	8	"Mo Job"	Genndy Tartakovsky	Don Shank	Don Shank	February 13, 2000	208
21	8	"Pet Feud"	Genndy Tartakovsky	Lynne Naylor	Don Shank	February 13, 2000	208
Princess Morbucks is tired of failing to come up with a good plot to destroy the Powerpuff Girls, so she hires Mojo Jojo to create a brilliant plan to strip the Powerpuff Girls of their powers. However, the plan eventually fails, and Princess Morbucks and Mojo are sent to jail. After the Professor genetically engineers a new pet—the fluffy and cuddly Beebo—he instructs the Girls feed their new pet only once. When the three Powerpuff Girls each feeds him a separate time without the knowledge of one another, the furry Beebo becomes a ravenous monster and starts eating everyone and everything in the city.
22	9	"Imaginary Fiend"	Randy Myers	Cindy Morrow	Don Shank	March 17, 2000	209
22	9	"Cootie Gras"	John McIntyre	Charlie Bean	Don Shank	March 17, 2000	209
A new boy in school creates an imaginary friend named Patches who starts causing trouble, with the boy getting blamed for most of Patches' antics. When the true culprit is discovered, the solution to stop Patches is another imaginary friend from the Powerpuff Girls. The young girls at Pokey Oaks Kindergarten are stalked by Harry Pitt, who is rumored to have cooties. Seeing the power of repulsion Harry has on the Powerpuff Girls, Mojo Jojo turns the piggish boy into the ultimate weapon.
23	10	"The Powerpuff Girls Best Rainy Day Adventure Ever"	Randy Myers	David Smith	Don Shank	April 28, 2000	210
23	10	"Just Desserts"	Randy Myers	David Smith	Don Shank	April 28, 2000	210
On a rainy day, because there isn't a crime to be found in the city, the Girls make up their own crime fighting adventure inside their home using the power of their imagination. In this sequel to 1999's "Supper Villain", the Smiths plan their revenge on the Powerpuff Girls for ruining their dinner after Harold Smith returns from prison.
24	11	"Twisted Sister"	John McIntyre	Clayton Morrow	Don Shank	May 26, 2000	211
24	11	"Cover Up"	Genndy Tartakovsky	Chris Reccardi	Don Shank	May 26, 2000	211
The Girls need an extra hand at saving the day and attempt to create a fourth Powerpuff Girl, named "Bunny." However, when they don't quite duplicate the famous ingredients that Powerpuff Girls are made of, Bunny comes out less than expected, releasing villains from jail and fighting the police. The Girls eventually tell her that she is doing everything wrong, and when they subsequently get into more trouble than they can handle, Bunny saves them. Unfortunately, she explodes at the end of the episode due to being unstable. Buttercup believes her lucky blanket gives her the strength to be a good fighter, but her sisters quickly get on her case.
25	12	"Speed Demon"	Randy Myers	Charlie Bean	Don Shank	June 2, 2000	212
25	12	"Mojo Jonesin'"	John McIntyre	Kevin Kaliher	Don Shank	June 2, 2000	212
A race home from school finds the Girls breaking the speed of light and traveling to an alternate future, where the day they had traveled to the future meant they mysteriously disappeared from history, leaving the world for 50 years with their absence, as well as everything and everyone in the clutches of their most evil enemy—Him. A quartet of kids from the Powerpuff Girls' school discuss their thoughts on having superpowers like the Girls, when they are approached by a "stranger" (Mojo Jojo in disguise) who offers them Chemical X. Unfortunately, the quartet of kids decides to take the stranger's request to take down the Girls. But realizing they were tricked by Mojo, they use their remaining energy to revitalize the Girls.
26	13	"Something's a Ms."	Randy Myers	Chris Savino	Don Shank	June 30, 2000	213
26	13	"Slumbering with the Enemy"	Randy Myers	Lynne Naylor	Don Shank	June 30, 2000	213
Ms. Bellum begins using her feminine wiles to coax the Mayor into giving her time off, but it turns out she wants to commit crimes. When something seems amiss, the Powerpuff Girls investigate and find out that "Ms. Bellum" is actually the villainess Sedusa in disguise. The Powerpuff Girls throw a slumber party and invite every girl in their school to come. Mojo Jojo steals the final invitation and comes to the party dressed up as Mojesha. When the Girls catch on, "Mojesha" seems like she just wants to party, but he may be planning a ruse to get rid of them.

=== Season 3 (2000–01) ===
As with previous seasons, Craig McCracken directs every episode with different co-directors. Don Shank serves as art director of every episode, with Craig Kellman co-directing the art in "Monkey See, Doggy Two".

No. overall	No. in season	Title	Directed by	Storyboarded by	Original release date	Prod. code
27	1	"Fallen Arches"	John McIntyre	David Smith	July 28, 2000	301
27	1	"The Mane Event"	Genndy Tartakovsky	Lynne Naylor	July 28, 2000	301
A trio of old villains called the Ministry of Pain return, and the girls intend to fight them, but Blossom refuses to let her sisters bring them to justice because of their old age to "respect their elders". She finds a possible situation: recruit the former heroes, Captain Righteous, and his sidekick, Lefty, who used to fight against the Ministry of Pain. Unfortunately, these former heroes cannot agree with each other and Blossom's plan backfires when all five men suffer injuries and get taken to the hospital's intensive care unit. After Bubbles and Buttercup mistakenly give Blossom a botched haircut, she gets made fun of by everybody in the city. When an all-seeing monster appears, Blossom now has to help her sisters stop this monster and deal with the humiliation.
28	2	"Town and Out"	John McIntyre	Charlie Bean	August 18, 2000	302
28	2	"Child Fearing"	Genndy Tartakovsky	Mike Moon	August 18, 2000	302
When the Professor gets a job offer at a research lab in the town of Citiesville, he and the girls move there. The girls are quick to offer their help to the city; however, the high degree of property damage that they cause prompts the Mayor of Citiesville to reject the use of super powers. When the girls tell the Professor that they hate living in Citiesville, he reveals that he hates it too and they all agree that they should move back to Townsville. When the Professor runs late for an event, he quickly calls the Mayor, who then calls up for a babysitter for the girls. It turns out that the babysitter is actually Mojo Jojo, who wants the girls to help him conquer Townsville, but they make it a hilarious challenge for him.
29	3	"Criss Cross Crisis"	Genndy Tartakovsky	Don Shank	September 8, 2000	303
One of Professor Utonium's failed experiments causes everyone in the city to switch bodies. He must find a solution whilst the girls (in different bodies) fight Mojo Jojo, in the body of an old woman.
30	4	"Bubblevision"	Genndy Tartakovsky	Kevin Kaliher	September 15, 2000	304
30	4	"Bought and Scold"	John McIntyre	Cindy Morrow & Paul Rudish	September 15, 2000	304
When Bubbles can't take a direct hit at The Giant Ant, the Professor does some tests and it turns out that her eye vision has gone blurry as she looks in all directions even when talking to someone face to face. As she gets glasses, she gets made fun of by Blossom and Buttercup, who call her things like "dork" and "nerd". Daddy Morbucks buys Townsville from the Mayor for "a room full of Turkish delight", and as her first act, "Mayor Princess" legalizes crime. However, the Girls show her that repealing crime was a double-edged sword when Daddy Morbucks is robbed and the girls now have leverage over Princess, unless she gives back Townsville.
31	5	"Gettin' Twiggy With It"	John McIntyre	Chris Reccardi	September 22, 2000	305
31	5	"Cop Out"	Robert Alvarez	Kevin Kaliher	September 22, 2000	305
Mitch Mitchelson is an evil pet sitter for the class hamster Twiggy. He pretends to be nice to her around the others, but the girls see through Mitch's superficial niceness and soon Twiggy is turned into a monster. Mike Brickowski is one of the worst officers on the Townsville Police Force. When his lazy habits get him fired, he blames his troubles on the girls and tries to destroy them, only for him to get thrown in jail for his arrogance.
32	6	"Three Girls and a Monster"	Randy Myers	Kevin Kaliher & Chris Savino	October 6, 2000	307
32	6	"Monkey See, Doggy Two"	Genndy Tartakovsky & Robert Alvarez	Chris Reccardi & Don Shank	October 6, 2000	307
An undefeatable monster comes to Townsville, with Blossom (using team tactics) and Buttercup (using direct action) disagreeing on how to defeat the monster. On the other hand, Bubbles uses her "sugar" personality, by asking the monster to leave, which surprisingly ends up working well. Mojo Jojo steals the Anubial Jewels and the Anubis dog head again to change the world into dogs. This time, he runs a tape to show the girls what happened the first time, and not make those mistakes. Nevertheless, he ends up making an even bigger mistake and fails again.
33	7	"Jewel of the Aisle"	Randy Myers	Dave Smith	October 20, 2000	306
33	7	"Super Zeroes"	John McIntyre	Clayton Morrow	October 20, 2000	306
A clumsy robber gets away from the girls with a diamond, but ends up losing it in a box of 'Lucky Captain Rabbit King Nuggets' cereal. It just so happens that Professor Utonium happened to buy the box the diamond is in. The robber disguises himself as the character Lucky Captain Rabbit King, but his 'costumed attempts' meet with failure. When the girls read comic books, they believe that they will be better superheroes if they copy the comics. Instead, they end up wasting time with their ridiculous outfits and characteristics that fail to impress the monsters.
34	8	"Candy Is Dandy"	Randy Myers	Clayton Morrow	November 10, 2000	308
34	8	"Catastrophe"	John McIntyre	Steven Fonti	November 10, 2000	308
The girls get a reward for saving the day: candy, which they quickly grow an addiction to. When nothing happens in Townsville, they convince Mojo Jojo to do crimes so they can get awarded and then the girls will bust him out the next day. When Mojo steals the Mayor's candy, the Girls learn what the extra sugar has done to them. The girls fight a giant blob monster who proves impervious to all their attacks. When they find that it was only looking for its cat, they help it look for it before the monster destroys Townsville.
35	9	"Hot Air Buffoon"	John McIntyre	Mike Stern & Chris Savino	December 1, 2000	309
35	9	"Ploys R' Us"	Robert Alvarez	Cindy Morrow	December 1, 2000	309
The Mayor tries to save Townsville after being criticized by the nighttime cleaning staff woman that he just sits there and does nothing. He then causes destruction and the girls have to quickly find him before he inadvertently destroys the city in a hot air balloon. The girls wake up to find their room filled with toys. They soon figure out that the Professor has been sleepwalking, and stealing. Instead of reporting it, the girls take advantage of the situation, until the Professor discovers it and makes the girls learn a huge lesson by plotting a huge setup.
36	10	"The Headsucker's Moxy"	Randy Myers	Lynne Naylor	January 5, 2001	311
36	10	"Equal Fights"	Randy Myers	Lauren Faust	January 5, 2001	311
A little leech man sucks information from other people's brains. People find it hard to remember what happened after this, so the girls then use the Mayor as a defense to give the leech nothing. A female villain and radical feminist named Femme Fatale convinces the girls to hate men, so she can get away with crimes and steal all of the Susan B. Anthony dollars in the city. Miss Bellum and Ms. Keane encourage the girls to protect everyone (including the men) after other women reveal that Fatale doesn't follow her preaches. The girls soon teach Femme Fatale a harsh lesson for both her misandry and defamation of Susan B. Anthony for what she stood up for.
37	11	"Powerprof."	Randy Myers	Lauren Faust	February 9, 2001	310
Professor Utonium wants to spend quality time with the Powerpuff Girls. However, due to the fact that peace doesn't last long in Townsville, the Powerpuff Girls can't really go anywhere. Professor Utonium decides to become a superhero to spend time with the Powerpuff Girls. Unfortunately, when the Professor embarrasses the girls in public, the girls try to make him quit by allowing a one on one battle between the Professor and Mojo Jojo.
38	12	"Moral Decay"	Robert Alvarez	Craig McCracken & Lauren Faust	February 9, 2001	312
38	12	"Meet the Beat Alls"	John McIntyre	Craig McCracken	February 9, 2001	312
After the girls do chores around the house, the Professor awards them with a Sacagawea dollar each. Buttercup is so ecstatic that she accidentally knocks out one of Bubbles' teeth. However, her sadness turns to greed when Bubbles receives a dollar from the tooth fairy. Buttercup then proceeds to knock out the teeth of numerous villains, and starts hoarding the money she receives. As it comes to a head, Mojo Jojo, Fuzzy Lumpkins, Him, the Ganggreen Gang, and countless thugs decide to teach her a lesson by breaking her teeth and using her money savings with the Professor to pay for her dentist bills. This episode is laden with The Beatles references. Mojo Jojo, Fuzzy Lumpkins, Him, and Princess Morbucks go to the girls' house to defeat them. By coincidence, they all arrive at the same time and, after an argument, manage to do so by combining their abilities. Seeing the strength in working together, they decide to form the quartet villain group "The Beat-Alls." They engage in a crime spree across Townsville and the girls are overcome every time. The Professor encourages the girls to find a way to break up the group. Soon, Mojo meets performance criminal Moko Jono and begins adopting her style. The other members of the group become frustrated with her bizarre schemes and quit, allowing the girls to return and beat them. Mojo plans to continue committing crimes with Moko, but she is revealed to be a normal monkey, Michelle, who had agreed to help stop Mojo. The girls promptly take Mojo to prison.

=== Season 4 (2001–02) ===
For the final time, Craig McCracken directs every episode of the season. Don Shank serves as art director for the final time.

No. overall	No. in season	Title	Directed by	Storyboarded by	Original release date	Prod. code
39	1	"Him Diddle Riddle"	John McIntyre	David Smith & Chris Savino	April 14, 2001	403
HIM has given the girls a set of nine riddles to solve in a time limit. The various tasks test both the girls' physical and mental faculties. However, if they fail to complete them all on time, Him promises them that "the Professor will pay", meaning they would lose him forever, only to find it wasn't like that at all in the end.
40	2	"Film Flam"	John McIntyre	Charlie Bean	April 20, 2001	401
When a film director named Bernie Bernstein wants to come make a movie on the Powerpuff Girls saving the day, it goes all wrong on the red carpet when he is disrespectful to Bubbles, leading the Professor to overhear that the movie is a scam because Bernie wants to steal money from the Townsville bank. Now, he must alert the girls to the scam and cut the movie short before it's too late.
41	3	"All Chalked Up"	Randy Myers	Cindy Morrow & Clayton Morrow	April 27, 2001	407
After Buttercup destroys her chalk, Bubbles is offered a new set by a butterfly, who is Him in disguise. However, her drawings come to life, which attack Pokey Oaks and defeat her sisters. Now Bubbles must overcome her shock to stop these creatures, using chalk and duster as weapons.
42	4	"Get Back Jojo"	Randy Myers	Kevin Kaliher	May 4, 2001	402
Career Day at Pokey Oaks goes awry when Mojo Jojo arrives and jumps into the Professor's time machine. Now the girls must travel to the past to keep Mojo from preventing their creation by hurting a younger version of the Professor.
43	5	"Members Only"	Randy Myers	Paul Rudish	May 25, 2001	404
The girls try to join the superhero organization, the Association of World Super Men (AWSM), but they must prove themselves to do so by tests of strength, speed and smarts. But the only flaw about the organization is it doesn't allow "little girls" into the group and it's centered around men. However, when an enemy attacks the organization, the girls must come to their rescue.
44	6	"Nano of the North"	Rob Renzetti	Mark Andrews	June 1, 2001	408
Nanobots— microscopic robots— rain on Townsville to eat all the carbon in it, including clothes. The solution is to have the girls shrink to microscopic size to defeat them. However, they are too powerful for the girls and they are defeated. It is by the intervention of Professor Utonium that Townsville is saved.
45	7	"Stray Bullet"	Rob Renzetti	Lauren Faust & Shellie Kvilvang	June 8, 2001	409
Bubbles saves a squirrel from an eagle. They take her home, and before Bubbles sleeps, she gives a few drops of Chemical X. After getting trapped on a sticky floor by Mojo Jojo, the squirrel speeds through to save the girls, who name her Bullet. The four work together to protect Townsville, but Bullet finally decides to return to the woods to protect the animals.
46	8	"Forced Kin"	Robert Alvarez	Chris Reccardi & Chris Mitchell	June 22, 2001	410
A destructible alien life force predicts the Powerpuff Girls' every move. All their efforts are futile and the girls are ultimately defeated. Thus, Mojo Jojo has to team up with the Powerpuff Girls to save the day.
47	9	"Knock It Off"	Robert Alvarez	Charlie Bean & Chris Mitchell	July 13, 2001	405
Dick Hardly is a college friend of Professor Utonium. However, upon seeing the girls, Dick sees them as a key to fame and fortune. He then talks to the girls, and with the proper ingredients (including some stolen 'Chemical X'), creates the Powerpuff Girls X-Treme. Dick mass-produces them and soon the cheaply made knock-offs are in every corner of the globe. The girls try to stop Dick, who ingests the remainder of the 'Chemical X' he has on hand. The substance then turns Dick into a monster, who then tries to steal the 'Chemical X' from the girls themselves. When the Professor finds out, his love causes the spiteful Dick to lose control of the clones.
48	10	"Helter Shelter"	John McIntyre	Cindy Morrow	October 12, 2001 (Note: "Helter Shelter" and "Power Lunch" were first released separately on the VHS tapes Boogie Frights and Buttercrush and together on the DVD The Mane Event on April 3, 2001, as home video exclusives, and as a result, they did not air on television until October 12, 2001.)	313
48	10	"Power Lunch"	John McIntyre	Chris Savino & Genndy Tartakovsky	October 12, 2001	313
Bubbles' love for animals goes too far. After the Professor finds animals in the closet, she is told to stop bringing these animals home. She now has to keep her newest animal, a baby whale, out of the Professor's eyes, but her chance starts to drown when the whale dries up. After feeling a side effect from eating and drinking sweets combined with the Girls' heat ray, the Ganggreen Gang then get superpowers. Ace has ice powers, Snake has stretching powers, Lil' Arturo has fast speed, Grubber has a loud belch that can tear bricks off of walls, and Big Billy is a rock. Now, it's superpowered good girls versus the superpowered bad teens.
49	11	"Superfriends"	Rob Renzetti	Cindy Morrow & Clayton Morrow	May 18, 2002	406
The girls make a new friend named Robin, but their friendship is strained by the girls' constant need of aid of protecting Townsville. This leaves her in Princess's agenda, and the girls must try to reaffirm Robin's friendship.

=== Season 5 (2002–04) ===
For the remainder of the series, Paul Stec serves as art director, although he is uncredited for the first two episodes of the season.

No. overall	No. in season	Title	Directed by	Storyboarded and written by	Original release date	Prod. code
50	1	"Keen on Keane"	Lauren Faust & Craig McCracken	Lauren Faust	December 6, 2002	501
50	1	"Not So Awesome Blossom"	Robert Alvarez, Lauren Faust, & Craig McCracken	Dave Dunnet	December 6, 2002	501
The Professor and Miss Keane go out on a date set up by the girls, though Ms. Keane and Professor get distracted from using the hotline so much that the Mayor cannot reach the girls. Blossom loses confidence in herself after failing to destroy Mojo Jojo's robots, believing she is a jinx. After Buttercup defeats Mojo Jojo's robots, she replaces Blossom as the leader while Mojo Jojo comes up with a plan to destroy the girls and the Professor. Blossom is put to the test when Mojo challenges her to deal with his hazardous balancing traps.
51	2	"Power-Noia"	Randy Myers, Lauren Faust, & Craig McCracken	Justin Thompson	December 13, 2002	502
After defeating a monster, the girls return home for some well-deserved sleep, but are unaware of the evil that lurks above them as it turns out that Him has used the girls' own fears against them. The girls must face their greatest fears and bring down the monstrous Him.
52	3	"Monstra-City"	Randy Myers	Carey Yost & Lauren Faust	September 5, 2003	504
52	3	"Shut the Pup Up"	Robert Alvarez	Cindy Morrow	September 5, 2003	504
When the Mayor finds the deed to Monster Isle, the monsters move to Townsville causing havoc between monsters and humans. The girls try to keep the peace and let everyone in Townsville live in harmony, but when Townsville gets far too crowded, the girls trick the Mayor into giving back Monster Isle to all the monsters. After witnessing a crime, Talking Dog stays at the Powerpuff Girls house for a while as part of a witness protection program. The girls try to get him to tell them about the crime he witnessed, but all he does is just insult everyone by mistake.
53	4	"Toast of the Town"	Randy Myers	Chris Reccardi	September 12, 2003	506
53	4	"Divide and Conquer"	John McIntyre	Paul McEvoy	September 12, 2003	506
When the Mayor's toaster is broken, he gives it to the Professor to fix it, and he accidentally discovers the Professor's secret stash of Chemical X. He believes that it is a hair growth formula, but instead, The Chemical X makes the Mayor grow huge and it is up to the Powerpuff Girls to calm him down and return him down to size without constantly telling him that he's a "baby". After stealing a tangerine and watching it split up into different pieces, the Amoeba Boys learn how to multiply and make duplicates of themselves. Meanwhile, at Pokey Oaks, Ms. Keane teaches the kids math and the Powerpuff Girls must use math to stop the Amoeba Boys.
54	5	"Burglar Alarmed"	Randy Myers	Mark O'Hare	September 19, 2003	507
54	5	"Shotgun Wedding"	John McIntyre	Alex Almaguer	September 19, 2003	507
The girls realize that the Professor is tired after preparing for his dissertation tomorrow, so when a burglar new to Townsville tries to rob them, the girls try to stop him without waking up the Professor. The Professor tries to figure out just what kind of species Fuzzy Lumpkins is, but when he accidentally gets covered in mud and flowers, it makes him look like a Lumpkin, which Fuzzy falls in love with and tries to marry. When the girls realize the Professor is missing, they have to fight through Fuzzy's entire family to find the Professor before things get complicated.
55	6	"Save Mojo"	Randy Myers	Greg Colton	September 26, 2003	508
55	6	"Substitute Creature"	John McIntyre	Mark O'Hare	September 26, 2003	508
When the Powerpuff Girls try to stop Mojo Jojo from doing a crime, an animal activist group comes to his rescue protesting that the Powerpuff Girls can't harm him because he is an endangered animal. With this knowledge, Mojo takes advantage of their protest and commits more crimes, until a loophole in the law puts Mojo into the woods full of monkeys and apes. When Ms. Keane gets sick, she hires a substitute teacher named Mr. Green to run the class in her absence. Unfortunately, because of his monstorous appearance, the girls assume he is a bad guy and try to save their classmates from him.
56	7	"The Boys Are Back in Town"	Randy Myers & John McIntyre	Brian Larsen & Chris Reccardi	November 6, 2003	509
Him is sick and tired of all of the villains (including himself) failing in their neverending plot to destroy the Powerpuff Girls, so he brings the Rowdyruff Boys back to life and makes them more powerful than ever. The Powerpuff Girls try to defeat them by kissing them again, but this time, instead of the kisses destroying them, it only makes them "bigger and more powerful." After Buttercup has finally had enough of their relentless and sadistic bullying after they made Bubbles cry, she makes Butch bite his tongue, causing his brothers to laugh and make him shrink, thus exposing their new weakness, as Blossom puts it, "whenever their masculinity is threatened, they shrink in size." And so, the Powerpuffs do various things to embarrass their counterparts, defeating them once again.
57	8	"Pee Pee G's"	Randy Myers	Cindy Morrow	November 13, 2003	511
57	8	"Boy Toys"	Randy Myers	Brian Larsen	November 13, 2003	511
The girls find their bed soaking wet, but they refuse to admit that they did it, quickly distracting them with fear, not knowing that Mojo Jojo is just passing by accident. Princess Morbucks finally meets the Rowdyruff Boys as they fight the Powerpuff Girls. When she tries to prove herself to the boys, they reject her. The girls realize they need better firepower to stop the boys, so they temporarily recruit Princess. However, Princess is surprised that the girls allow the boys to take their powerful vehicles.
58	9	"Seed No Evil"	Randy Myers	Mike Bell	November 25, 2003	512
58	9	"City of Clipsville"	John McIntyre	Chris Reccardi	November 25, 2003	512
A frozen caveman and mastodon at the museum thaws out and goes out to steal the seeds of Townsville, which makes the Mayor his top target. A clip show episode that reflects on the past four seasons. The episode features some clips that did not actually happen. Note: Clips are shown from "Cover Up", "Monkey See, Doggie Do", and "Monkey See, Doggy Two".
59	10	"Lying Around the House"	Randy Myers	Chris Savino	January 9, 2004	513
59	10	"Bubble Boy"	Randy Myers	Cindy Morrow	January 9, 2004	513
The girls' (and the Professor's) little white lies turn into a big problem when a monster starts to grow and make trouble around the house. Bubbles goes undercover with the Rowdyruff Boys by pretending to be Boomer (having been ambushed by the girls). Unfortunately, she is not exactly cut out to be Rowdyruff material.
60	11	"The Powerpuff Girls: A Documentary"	Brian Larsen (Note: Not credited under either role, but rather a simple "A Film By" credit.)	Brian Larsen	January 16, 2004	514
60	11	"Girls Gone Mild"	John McIntyre	Chris Reccardi	January 16, 2004	514
A filmmaker makes a documentary on the Powerpuff Girls, but can't get a good clip of them. Stanley and Sandra Practice of P.A.P.P. (Parents Against PowerPuffs) threaten the Professor to take legal action to make sure that the girls never use their powers again, but they soon learn the hard way that Townsville is completely defenseless without them.
61	12	"See Me, Feel Me, Gnomey"	Chris Savino & John McIntyre	Chris Savino & Dave Smith; Music and lyrics by: David Smith	March 18, 2004 (YTV); Unaired (USA)	510
In this musical episode in the style of rock operas Jesus Christ Superstar and Tommy, the girls are overwhelmed with the crime in Townsville. An evil gnome (Jess Harnell) grants them the wish of peace in exchange for their powers and ends up inducting the people of Townsville into a cult. But when the girls realize the need for balance in the world, they themselves end the deal and send the gnome into nonexistence, returning Townsville back to normal. Although originally intended to air in the United States, "See Me, Feel Me, Gnomey" was pulled from Cartoon Network’s schedule. The decision was made due to concerns that certain visuals in the episode including imagery of beams of light forming crosses and the gnome’s resemblance to a messianic figure could be interpreted as religious symbolism.
62	13	"Curses"	Randy Myers	Tim Parsons	April 2, 2004	515
62	13	"Bang for Your Buck"	John McIntyre	Alex Almaguer	April 2, 2004	515
Bubbles overhears a bad word from the Professor. Then her sisters start to use it, too, which causes a shocking reaction around Townsville. When a giant potty mouth monster comes to attack, the Professor tells the girls what the "word" means and the girls teach the potty mouth a lesson. The girls and the Ganggreen Gang (who want more recognition) compete to raise enough money to buy a giant laser from Mojo Jojo.
63	14	"Silent Treatment"	John McIntyre	Bobby London	April 9, 2004	516
63	14	"Sweet 'n' Sour"	Randy Myers	Cindy Morrow	April 9, 2004	516
At a silent film showing movie theater the girls reluctantly attend, a silent film star captures the Professor. The girls must go inside the featured film and bring him back to the real world, without their powers. After the Powerpuff Girls beat Mojo Jojo, Fuzzy Lumpkins, and the Ganggreen Gang, the girls see a new group of criminals; a group of cute little animals that rob Townsville blind. The girls try to stop them, but because of their innocent looks, the animal criminals have the advantage and the town, blinded by the animals' cuteness, begins turning against the girls. The girls have to figure out a way to put an end to their crime streak by getting children involved.

=== Season 6 (2004–05) ===
No. overall	No. in season	Title	Directed by	Storyboarded and written by	Original release date	Prod. code
64	1	"Prime Mates"	John McIntyre	Mike Kim	April 16, 2004	601
64	1	"Coupe D'Etat"	Randy Myers	Chris Reccardi	April 16, 2004	601
Back when Mojo tried to take over the world with primates (during the events of The Powerpuff Girls Movie), there was one monkey who did not get his due: Mopey Popo. Now, Mopey is back to try to be evil just as Mojo intended, if only he could get something right. When Professor Utonium tries to upgrade his car, the girls realize that it is taking the Professor away from them, both figuratively and literally.
65	2	"Makes Zen to Me"	John McIntyre	Bryan Andrews	April 23, 2004	602
65	2	"Say Uncle"	Randy Myers	Written by : Craig Lewis; Storyboarded by : Mike Kim	April 23, 2004	602
Buttercup has to find inner peace after she is accused of being way too aggressive on Fuzzy Lumpkins. The girls' uncle comes to visit, but they mistakenly take a taffy-loving Sasquatch home, causing an identity misunderstanding.
66	3	"Reeking Havoc"	Robert Alvarez	Cindy Morrow	April 30, 2004	603
66	3	"Live & Let Dynamo"	Randy Myers	Bryan Andrews	April 30, 2004	603
Realizing the need for the Professor to win the chili contest, the girls each unknowingly add Chemical X to give it an extra kick. After the Professor wins the contest and having everyone tasting the chili, they all let out the gas which causes a gas monster to come out of the sewers and makes an awful stench around Townsville, affecting the civilians and it's up to the Girls to save the day from that monster stench. Dynamo is back and destroying Townsville again, so the girls must battle and stop it, as well as figure out who is controlling it.
67	4	"Mo' Linguish"	Randy Myers	Written by : Amy Keating Rogers; Storyboarded by : Mike Kim	May 7, 2004	604
67	4	"Oops, I Did It Again"	John McIntyre	Brian Larsen	May 7, 2004	604
When Mojo agrees to do some community service in lieu of jail-time by teaching at the Townsville Community College, he teaches his lengthy speeches to the people of Townsville, putting the city in a total standstill unless the girls can find someone with simple English to end the long-winding conversations. The Professor dreams he had made three normal little girls after realizing all of his successes are mere accidents.
68	5	"A Made Up Story"	John McIntyre & Randy Myers	Chris Reccardi	May 14, 2004	605
The villainess Mask Scara (Phyllis Diller) defaces the posters, billboards and people of Townsville after the Dull look replaces the Trashy look, affecting everyone except Blossom, who is one step ahead.
69	6	"Little Miss Interprets"	John McIntyre	Cindy Morrow	June 25, 2004	606
69	6	"Night Mayor"	Randy Myers	Chris Reccardi	June 25, 2004	606
The girls misinterpret the Professor's plans for a surprise party, instead assuming that he is making new Powerpuff Girls. The girls enter the Mayor's dream world to find the source of his nightmares.
70	7	"Custody Battle"	John McIntyre	Chris Reccardi	July 2, 2004	607
70	7	"City of Nutsville"	Randy Myers	Mark O'Hare	July 2, 2004	607
When Mojo discovers that the Rowdyruff Boys have returned, he competes with Him to determine who is the more evil father. Bubbles gets stung in the throat by a bee just as a bunch of squirrels start attacking Townsville. Bullet returns to deal with the Mayor's statue and the pothole full of nuts.
71	8	"Aspirations"	John McIntyre & Randy Myers	Bryan Andrews	July 9, 2004	608
The Ganggreen Gang is committing brilliant crimes for Sedusa, so she can avenge her previous defeat from Something's a Ms..
72	9	"That's Not My Baby"	John McIntyre	Thurop Van Orman	July 16, 2004	609
72	9	"Simian Says"	Randy Myers	Mike Kim	July 16, 2004	609
The girls rescue a baby from a monster and are forced to care for it when they cannot find its mother. Mojo takes over as the narrator. He commands the girls to do what he wants until it is revealed in the end what happened to the narrator.
73	10	"Sun Scream"	John McIntyre	Thurop Van Orman	July 23, 2004	610
73	10	"City of Frownsville"	Randy Myers	Bobby London	July 23, 2004	610
The Powerpuff Girls get sunburned fighting a solar flare and are unable to fight even the lowly street criminals. A miserable scientist named Lou Gubrious uses his machine to switch everyone's happiness with his sobbing depression, making him the happiest man in Townsville named Hal Larious. The girls have to find a way to make the people of Townsville happy again before they drown in their sorrow.
74	11	"West in Pieces"	Randy Myers & Robert Alvarez	Chris Reccardi	July 30, 2004	611
After Mojo the Kid robs the first bank in the town of Townsville, Professor Utonium creates the Steamypuff Gals to deal with him. This takes place during the fictional cowboy era.
75	12	"Crazy Mixed Up Puffs"	John McIntyre	Mike Kim	August 20, 2004	612
75	12	"Mizzen in Action"	Randy Myers	Bryan Andrews	August 20, 2004	612
Mojo Jojo manages to attach the Powerpuff Girls to each other, worsening the arguments they often have. Pirate Crack McCraigen (an anagram of series creator Craig McCracken) and his crew mistake Chemical X for treasure when they are mysteriously transported to the present, leaving the girls to fight these powered pirates to get the Professor back and the pirates back into the past.
76	13	"Roughing It Up"	John McIntyre	Thurop Van Orman	August 27, 2004	613
76	13	"What's the Big Idea?"	John McIntyre	Ken Allen	August 27, 2004	613
The Professor takes the girls on a camping trip to teach them to relax, but they are interrupted by Fuzzy Lumpkins and his three nephews and not even he can keep peace. Mojo enhances the girls' sizes so that they cannot stop him without causing massive collateral damage and it is up to the Professor to save the day.: In production order, this is the series finale.
77	14	"Nuthin' Special"	Randy Myers	Brian Larsen	March 25, 2005	503
77	14	"Neighbor Hood"	Robert Alvarez	Chris Reccardi	March 25, 2005	503
Buttercup tries to figure out her special ability after becoming jealous of Bubbles' many languages and Blossom's ice breath. Fortunately, only Buttercup is able to curl her tongue. When a suspicious children's television program that Bubbles tunes into tries to convince its viewers to send it money and she obliviously steals Townsville's treasury for it at the request, the other girls must show her what is actually going on behind the cameras.
78	15	"I See a Funny Cartoon in Your Future"	Chris Savino	Chris Savino	March 25, 2005	505
78	15	"Octi-Gone"	Randy Myers	Mucci Fassett	March 25, 2005	505
The girls try to catch a psychic-impersonating pickpocket (June Foray) that stole the Mayor's key. Bubbles tries to figure out who severed one of Octi's tentacles on the night of a major party at the girls' house.: In airing order, this is the series finale.

== Specials ==
=== Christmas special (2003) ===
Title	Directed by	Written by	Storyboarded by	Art directed by	Original release date
"'Twas the Fight Before Christmas"	Robert Alvarez, John McIntyre, & Randy Myers (animation)	Lauren Faust & Craig Lewis	Lauren Faust, Greg Colton, Brian Larsen, & Paul McEvoy	Paul Stec	December 12, 2003
On Christmas Eve, The Powerpuff Girls warn Princess Morbucks that she will not get anything but coal in her stocking if she does not improve her attitude. Princess becomes worried about the prospect and travels to the North Pole, but discovers that her name is the only one on Santa Claus' "naughty" list. She switches the headings of the "naughty" and "nice" lists in order to have her wish granted and become a Powerpuff Girl. Late that night, Bubbles finds that their house and other houses have nothing but coal, and thinks Santa made a mistake. The girls get ready to fly to the North Pole but are greeted by Princess Morbucks, now a Powerpuff Girl. A large chase and battle ensue as the girls rush to the North Pole to inform Santa while fighting off Princess. When they do arrive, Santa is not happy to see them, as they crash into his office after destroying his workshop, and, on top of that, he is exhausted from delivering coal all night. The Powerpuff Girls and Princess both make their case to Santa on which story to believe, but Santa soon recognizes the Powerpuff Girls and acknowledges their heroism. An infuriated Princess then throws a tantrum, which exposes her evil nature and her list-switching scheme in front of Santa. This results in her being put on the "Permanent Naughty Plaque", and having her powers stripped by Santa. Since the brawl has destroyed his sleigh, he asks the girls to deliver the year's presents in his stead. The girls happily accept the task and complete it in time, turning Princess over to the police and returning home just before sunrise so they can open their presents with Professor Utonium.

=== 10th anniversary special (2009) ===
A special 22-minute episode titled "The Powerpuff Girls Rule!!!" was produced to celebrate the series' 10th anniversary. The episode aired on January 19, 2009, and is included as a bonus feature on the 10th anniversary DVD box set.

Title	Directed by	Written by	Storyboarded by	Original release date
"The Powerpuff Girls Rule!!!"	Craig McCracken, Robert Alvarez, and Eric Pringle (animation)	Craig McCracken	Craig McCracken; Vaughn Tada (additional)	January 19, 2009
The Powerpuff Girls try to stop the villains of Townsville from obtaining the Key to the World, which actually gives its possessor the right to rule the world, and surprisingly enough, Mojo Jojo obtains the key, and actually makes the world a better place. However, he later finds that peace (to him) is boring, and makes Townsville the same old crime-filled town again. The show ends with the girls beating Mojo and saving the day.

=== CGI special (2014) ===
On January 28, 2013, it was announced that a new CGI special titled "Dance Pantsed" starring the girls would premiere late 2013. By the end of the year however, it was announced that the special would air on January 20, 2014. Craig McCracken did not participate in the production and had no say regarding the special.

Title	Directed by	Written and storyboarded by	Story by	Original release date
"The Powerpuff Girls: Dance Pantsed"	David P. Smith	Chris Mitchell, David P. Smith, and Will Mata	Dave Tennant and David P. Smith	January 20, 2014
Mojo Jojo kidnaps an opera singer, a flamboyant mathematician, and a somehow famous badger. After being humiliated yet again by the Powerpuff Girls, he devises a new plan, by creating a game similar to a different game which Bubbles seemed to enjoy. He sends it to Bubbles by pretending that it the successor to 'Dance Pantsed Revolution', which is called 'Dance Pantsed REVILution 2' which turns out to be a trap turning Bubbles into a dancing robot. The other Powerpuff Girls eventually follow, and are forced to capture the hostages Mojo Jojo previously captured, which Professor Utonium presumes that he is using them to get Chemical X. After the Powerpuff Girls defeat Mojo, he claims that his plan was not to get Chemical X, but rule Townsville by becoming a celebrity by starting a softball team, including the girls. Eventually, Professor Utonium, the Mayor, Ms. Bellum, and the Powerpuff Girls agree to be part of the softball team, just so they can win trophies. However, they end up tricking Mojo and he is taken to jail at the end.

== Home media ==
The following is a list of VHS, DVD, and Blu-ray releases for The Powerpuff Girls. Season one was first released in 2007 on Region 1 (US) and Region 4 (Australia); no other seasons were released separately in the United States, though seasons 2 and 3 were released in Australia. To mark the 10th anniversary of the show in 2009, the complete series DVD box set containing all the seasons, the Christmas TV movie, and "The Powerpuff Girls Rule!!!" special was released in the US; in 2015, the complete series was released on DVD in Australia.

=== VHS ===
At least eight different VHS tapes were released before the format gradually switched to DVD & Blu-ray. Some of the releases mentioned below were subsequently re-released on DVD, the VHS format came to an end in 2003 for the series.

Title	Episodes	Release date		Description
Title	Episodes	North America	Europe	Description
Bubblevicious	5	May 30, 2000	June 18, 2001	Includes "Uh Oh Dynamo", "Mr. Mojo's Rising", "Powerpuff Bluff", "Cat Man Do", and "Bubblevicious". Also includes a 16-page booklet of character biographies, interviews, stickers, and games.
Monkey See, Doggie Do	5	May 30, 2000	March 11, 2002	Includes "Monkey See, Doggie Do", "Mommy Fearest", "Telephonies", "Mime for a Change", and "The Bare Facts". Also includes a 16-page booklet of character biographies, interviews, stickers, and games.
Birthday Bash	5	November 7, 2000	March 11, 2002	Includes "Birthday Bash", "Beat Your Greens", "Paste Makes Waste", "Schoolhouse Rocked", and "Los Dos Mojos" as well as the Courage the Cowardly Dog episode "Journey to the Center of Nowhere". .
Dream Scheme	5	November 7, 2000	—N/a	Includes ", "Dream Scheme", "Just Another Manic Mojo", "Down n' Dirty", "Mo Job" and "Major Competition" as well as the Sheep in the Big City episode "In The Baa-ginning.
Twisted Sister	5	April 3, 2001	—N/a	Includes "Twisted Sister", "Something's a Ms.", "The Mane Event", "Criss Cross Crisis", and "Power Lunch" as well as a preview of Samurai Jack and the Dexter's Laboratory episode "Dexter's Lab: A Story".
Boogie Frights	5	April 3, 2001	—N/a	Includes "Boogie Frights", "Slumbering with the Enemy", "Ice Sore", "The Rowdyruff Boys", and "Helter Shelter".
Meet the Beat-Alls	5	October 23, 2001	—N/a	Includes "Meet the Beat-Alls", "Jewel of the Aisle", "Bubblevision", "Collect Her", and "Bought and Scold".
'Twas the Fight Before Christmas	1	October 7, 2003	—N/a	Includes the special episode "'Twas the Fight Before Christmas" and the Dexter's Laboratory episode “Dexter vs. Santa Claws”.

=== DVD ===
Title	Episodes	Release date			Description
Title	Episodes	Region 1	Region 2	Region 4	Description
Powerpuff Bluff	10	November 7, 2000	—N/a	September 3, 2001	Includes all episodes from the "Bubblevicious" and "Monkey See, Doggie Do" VHS releases as well as a bonus Sheep in the Big City episode.
Down 'n' Dirty	10	November 7, 2000	—N/a	—N/a	Includes all episodes from the "Birthday Bash" and "Dream Scheme" VHS releases.
The Mane Event	8	April 3, 2001	May 15, 2006	February 11, 2003	Includes all episodes from the "Twisted Sister" and "Boogie Frights" VHS releases except "Criss Cross Crisis" and "The Rowdyruff Boys".
Meet the Beat-Alls	7	December 4, 2001 (DVD re-release)	August 21, 2006	—N/a	Includes "Meet the Beat-Alls", "Jewel of the Aisle", "Equal Fights" (DVD), "Bubblevision", "Collect Her", "Bought and Scold", and "Buttercrush" (DVD) in addition to two music videos and special DVD-ROM features (DVD).
Volume 1 (Japanese)	8	—N/a	December 29, 2001	—N/a	Includes "Monkey See, Doggy Do", "Mommy Fearest", "Octi Evil", "Geshundfight", "Buttercrush", "Fuzzy Logic", "Boogie Frights", "Abracadaver", and a music video.
Volume 2 (Japanese)	8	—N/a	January 26, 2002	—N/a	Includes "Telephonies", "Tough Love", "Major Competition", "Mr. Mojo's Rising", "Paste Makes Waste", "Ice Sore", "Bubblevicious", "The Bare Facts", and a music video.
Volume 3 (Japanese)	7	—N/a	January 26, 2002	—N/a	Includes "The Rowdyruff Boys", "Birthday Bash", "Too Pooped to Puff", "Dream Scheme", "You Snooze You Loose", "Mo Job", "Pet Feud", and a music video.
Volume 4 (Japanese)	8	—N/a	February 28, 2002	—N/a	Includes "Uh, Oh... Dynamo", "Cat Man Do", "Mime for a Change", "Just Another Manic Mojo", "Down n' Dirty", "Powerpuff Bluff", "Collect Her", and What a Cartoon! pilot "Meat Fuzzy Lumpkins".
Volume 5 (Japanese)	9	—N/a	February 28, 2002	—N/a	Includes "School House Rocked", "Imaginary Fiend", "Impeach Fuzz", "Daylight Savings", "Slumbering with the Enemy", "Los Dos Mojos", "Stuck Up, Up and Away", "Bubblevision", and What a Cartoon! pilot "Crime 101".
Volume 6 (Japanese)	8	—N/a	March 27, 2002	—N/a	Includes "Supper Villain", "Cover Up", "Beat Your Greens", "Child Fearing", "The Powerpuff Girls Best Rainy Day Adventure Ever", "The Mane Event", "Twisted Sister", "Mojo Jonesin", and a music video.
Volume 7 (Japanese)	9	—N/a	March 27, 2002	—N/a	Includes "Criss Cross Crisis", "Catastrophe", "Just Desserts", "Slave the Day", "A Very Special Blossom", "Monkey See, Doggie Two", and "Whoopass Stew: A Sticky Situation".
Volume 8 (Japanese)	8	—N/a	April 24, 2002	—N/a	Includes "Mo Job", "Something's a Ms.", "Cootie Gras", "Hot Air Buffoon", "Super Zeroes", "Power Lunch", "Three Girls & a Monster", "Helter Shelter", and a music video.
Volume 9 (Japanese)	6	—N/a	April 24, 2002	—N/a	Includes "Fallen Arches", "Candy Is Dandy", "Town and Out", "Power Prof", "Ploys R'Us", and "Gettin' Twiggy with It".
Volume 10 (Japanese)	7	—N/a	May 22, 2002	—N/a	Includes "Bought & Scold", "Moral Decay", "Insect Inside", "Headsucker's Moxy", "Equal Fights", "Jewel of the Aisie", and "Speed Demon".
Volume 11 (Japanese)	5	—N/a	May 22, 2002	—N/a	Includes "Cop Out", "Meet the Beat Alls", "Film Flam", "Get Back Jojo", "Members Only", and a music video.
Volume 12 (Japanese)	4	—N/a	June 26, 2002	—N/a	Includes "Knock It Off", "Superfriends", "Stray Bullet", "All Chalked Up", and a Powerpuff Girls Movie trailer.
Volume 13 (Japanese)	3	—N/a	June 26, 2002	—N/a	Includes "Him Diddle Riddle", "Nano of the North", "Forced Kin", and a Powerpuff Girls Movie trailer.
'Twas the Fight Before Christmas	1	October 7, 2003	November 25, 2005 (Japanese)	November 8, 2005	Includes the special episode "'Twas the Fight Before Christmas" as well as the Dexter's Laboratory episode "Dexter vs. Santa's Claws" and two music videos.
The Powerpuff Girls and Friends	8	May 6, 2014	—N/a	—N/a	Includes "Monkey See, Doggie Do/Mommy Fearest", "Insect Inside/Powerpuff Bluff", "Octi Evil/Geshundfight", "Buttercrush/Fuzzy Logic", "Boogie Frights/Abracadaver", "Telephonies/Tough Love", "Major Competition/Mr. Mojo's Rising", and "Paste Makes Waste/Ice Sore".
The Powerpuff Girls - Dance Pantsed and More!	7	—N/a	—N/a	January 7, 2015	Includes the "Dance Pantsed" special, "Cat Man Do", "Impeach Fuzz", "Helter Shelter", "Power Lunch", "Him Diddle Riddle", and "Superfriends".

==== Complete collections ====
Title	Episodes	Release date			Description
Title	Episodes	Region 1	Region 2	Region 4	Description
Complete Season 1 (U.S. version)	13	June 19, 2007 (Note: Season one was first released in 2007 under Region 1 and later re-released with The Powerpuff Girls: The Complete Series.)	—N/a	—N/a	This two-disc release includes all 13 episodes from the first season as well as the original pilot.
Complete Season 1 (Australian version)	13	—N/a	—N/a	April 16, 2007	This two-disc release includes all 13 episodes from the first season as well as the original pilot, an interview with McCracken, the What a Cartoon! shorts, and episode animatics.
Complete Season 2	13	—N/a	—N/a	April 9, 2008	This two-disc release includes all 13 episodes from the second season.
Complete Season 3	13	—N/a	—N/a	June 3, 2009	This two-disc release includes all 13 episodes from the third season in addition to two music videos and a promotional video for the series.
The Complete Series; 10th Anniversary Collection	78	January 20, 2009 (Note: All 78 episodes were released in 2009 under Region 1 through the DVD The Powerpuff Girls: The Complete Series.); May 21, 2024 (re-release)	—N/a	—N/a	This six-disc release includes all 78 episodes from the series as well as the documentary The Powerpuff Girls: Who, What, Where, How, Why... Who Cares? with McCracken, the Whoopass Girls pilot, both What a Cartoon! shorts, music videos, series promos, the "'Twas the Fight Before Christmas" movie, the "Powerpuff Girls Rule!!!" special, and a panoramic poster designed by McCracken.
The Complete Series (Australian version)	78	—N/a	—N/a	December 2, 2015 October 17, 2018 (20th Anniversary Edition)	The first "complete series" is a twelve-disc release that includes everything in the Region 1 "10th Anniversary Collection" except for the poster. It was released again on October 17, 2018, as a 20th anniversary edition.
