= The Big Shot! =

- The Ren & Stimpy Show episode
- Episode no.: Season 1 Episode 1b
- Directed by: John Kricfalusi
- Story by: John Kricfalusi; Vincent Waller
- Production code: RS-01B
- Original air date: August 11, 1991

Episode chronology
← Previous "Stimpy's Big Day!"	Next → "Robin Höek"

"The Big Shot!" is the second episode of the first season of The Ren & Stimpy Show. It originally aired on Nickelodeon in the United States on August 11, 1991.

== Plot ==
Continuing the story began in "Stimpy's Big Day!", Ren wanders around in the caravan, which had fallen into disrepair. He attempts to feel good about Stimpy's absence, only to be constantly reminded of his betrayal, after which he breaks down in tears. At Hollywood, Stimpy is filming an advertisement where Mr. Horse tests out Gritty Kitty Litter; he is shocked by the litter's effect in absorbing smells.

Back at the caravan, Ren attempts to sleep, only for Stimpy's picture to fluoresce. He tries to sleep outside, only for the pillow to resemble Stimpy's face and scaring Ren. Meanwhile, Stimpy is revealed to have received a mansion. Two women watch as he dives from a high spot into what seems like solid ground, seemingly plummeting to his death, only to reveal it to be a gigantic box of Gritty Kitty Litter. Stimpy swims in the litter for leisure.

A stressed Ren attempts to calm down by watching television, only for every channel to air shows of different genres starring Stimpy. He ends up on an episode of The Stimpy & Muddy Show, depicted as a badly animated chase sequence with both characters hurling non sequiturs at each other. Muddy Mudskipper praises Stimpy backstage for his performance, only for Stimpy to cry, having been homesick and missed Ren the entire time. Stimpy terminates the contract, ending his brief film career, and returns home.

A depressed Ren hears a knock on the door and approaches, only for Stimpy to appear. Both are happy to see each other and embrace, only for Stimpy to reveal he had given away the entirety of his prize money. This angers Ren, who slaps Stimpy for his "foolish" actions, but both are content with each other's company.

"Ask Dr. Stupid", a show featured while Ren was swapping channels, would become a recurring segment in the series. A segment after the episode shows characters in the show bidding the audience goodbye.

== Cast ==
- John Kricfalusi as Ren
- Billy West as Stimpy
- Harris Peet as Muddy Mudskipper
- Cheryl Chase as Pool Babe
- Jim Smith as TV Announcer

== Production ==
Originally, the story of the first episode was intended to be one story, but it was decided to split it into two parts to properly tell it. Bob Camp stated: "There was so much we wanted to do with the story, we had trouble packing it into one eleven-minute cartoon. It was actually easier to stretch it out than to compass it". The couple of John Kricfalusi and Lynne Naylor set the story in the 1950s as a reference to the world of their youth. In what became a recurring feature of The Ren & Stimpy Show, Kricfalusi first introduced in "The Big Shot!" the scatological humor that was to play such a central role for the rest of the show. Much of the plot revolves around kitty litter, and the story of "The Big Shot!" makes no effort to hide what is the purpose of kitty litter. The work of inking and painting both "Stimpy's Big Day!" and "The Big Shot!" was done at Lacewood Productions in Ottawa. Thad Komorowski wrote in both "Stimpy's Big Day!" and "The Big Shot!" that "the drawing is occasionally poor, the animation mostly rigid, and the cleanup and ink-and-paint work is absolutely atrocious".

== Reception ==
Komorowski wrote that "The Big Shot!" was "an entertaining start to the series" and awarded the episode four stars out of five. The American critic Matt Langer praised "The Big Shot!" as an "iconic post-modern commentary" on stardom in Hollywood and a satire of the 1954 film A Star Is Born. Langer wrote that Kricfalusi had a deep "concern with the cultural detritus of television centres" as the dialogue said by Muddy Mudskipper and Stimpy on their TV show is recycled from cartoon shows of the 1950s.

== Books ==
- Dobbs, G. Michael (2015). Escape – How Animation Broke into the Mainstream in the 1990s. Orlando: BearManor Media. ISBN 978-1593931100.
- Langer, Matt (June 1993). "Animatophilia, Cultural Production and Corporate Interests: The Case of 'Ren & Stimpy'". Film History. 5 (2): 125–141.
- Komorowski, Thad (2017). Sick Little Monkeys: The Unauthorized Ren & Stimpy Story. Albany, Georgia: BearManor Media. ISBN 978-1629331836.
