= Nurse Stimpy =

- The Ren & Stimpy Show episode
- Episode no.: Season 1 Episode 2b
- Directed by: John Kricfalusi (credited as Raymond Spum)
- Story by: John Kricfalusi; Bob Camp
- Production code: RS-02B
- Original air date: August 25, 1991

Episode chronology
← Previous "Robin Höek"	Next → "Space Madness"

"Nurse Stimpy" is the fourth episode of the first season of The Ren & Stimpy Show. It originally aired on Nickelodeon in the United States on August 25, 1991.

== Plot ==
One beautiful morning, Stimpy wakes up on time and optimistically looks forward for a new day, only to find Ren deathly ill. Concerned by Ren's condition, Stimpy dresses up as Nurse Stimpy in order to nurse Ren back to health, to Ren's chagrin.

Stimpy decides to examine Ren, removing his nose which is revealed to be a bag holding a series of items. He ponders using various dangerous items such as a saw and drill, which stresses Ren further. Stimpy puts his nose back in place and instead takes out an ice cream bar, which he immediately eats and uses the stick as a tongue depressor. Disgusted by the sight, Stimpy prompts Ren to reveal his salivary glands, both comically large and wearing top hats. Stimpy proceeds to use a sphygmomanometer on Ren, who is inflated and deflated like a balloon.

After resting, Stimpy feeds Ren his medicine. Despite seemingly pouring the entire bottle of medicine onto the floor, Stimpy feeds Ren a gigantic spoonful of medicine. Ren struggles to swallow the medicine due to its unpleasant taste, eventually succeeding after throwing up a small amount. It is revealed that Stimpy bought all-purpose icky-tasty medicine for Ren, and he throws the bottle away before Ren finds out.

Four months later, Stimpy visits Ren to rinse his spleen, only for Ren to smell badly as he had not bathed in weeks. Stimpy helps Ren bathe, which he initially found to be unpleasant but eventually enjoys. A crowd led by Mr. Horse peeks into the house. A day later, Ren thanks Stimpy for his good deeds, only to find out that their bath had been publicized for absolutely no reason, prompting Ren to faint in shock. Stimpy sees this as a relapse of his illness. Weeks go by as Stimpy gets increasingly serious and desperate on his attempts to save Ren, as Ren's situation gradually gets more serious. Stimpy eventually has a nervous breakdown caused by overworking and constantly drinking coffee.

After an unknown period of time, Ren wakes up cured, only to find Stimpy becoming as sickly as he had been earlier. He dresses up as Nurse Ren, to Stimpy's chagrin.

A segment after the episode features Ren waving goodbye, with Stimpy introducing his Magical Nose Goblins before doing the same.

== Cast ==
- John Kricfalusi as Ren
- Billy West as Stimpy
- Chris Reccardi as the reader (uncredited)

== Production ==
The episode had a troubled production, with the script being rewritten five times. The storyboard work for "Nurse Stimpy" was done by Chris Reccardi while Bob Camp did the layout, with the rest of the work being done by Lacewood Productions in Ottawa. John Kricfalusi did not disapprove of Lacewood's animation, despite turning out to be much worse than that of the first two episodes; he rather disliked the entire episode so much he used a pseudonym for the director's credit. In a 1993 interview, Kricfalusi called the episode "ugly". Bob Camp compared the episode's quality to that of a Hanna-Barbera production at the episode's premiere.

== Reception ==
American journalist Thad Komorowski gave the episode two out of five stars, writing that "Nurse Stimpy" is "merely an exhibition of toilet humor".

== Books ==
- Klickstein, Matthew; Summers, Marc (2013). Slimed! An Oral History of Nickelodeon's Golden Age. London: Penguin Publishing Group. ISBN 9781101614099.
- Komorowski, Thad (2017). Sick Little Monkeys: The Unauthorized Ren & Stimpy Story. Albany, Georgia: BearManor Media. ISBN 978-1629331836.
