= Big House Blues =

Theatrical short film pilot of The Ren & Stimpy Show

- Title card
- Directed by: John Kricfalusi
- Written by: John Kricfalusi; Bob Camp; Jim Smith; Lynne Naylor (uncredited)
- Produced by: John Kricfalusi
- Starring: John Kricfalusi; Billy West; Jim Smith; Henry Porch; Brian Chin; Cheryl Chase; Lynne Naylor
- Music by: Chris Reccardi; Jim Smith
- Production company: Spümcø
- Distributed by: Nickelodeon Productions (original airing)
- Release date: December 21, 1990
- Running time: 6 minutes
- Countries: United States; Canada
- Language: English

Big House Blues is a 1990 American animated comedy short film produced by Spümcø. Originally screened at a film festival on December 21, 1990, it was succeeded by The Ren & Stimpy Show on the network, which serves as a pilot episode. A censored version was later aired on Nickelodeon for its first season, while the full, uncensored version would air on Spike TV (now known as Paramount Network) in 2003 as part of the "first" episode of Adult Party Cartoon.

== Plot ==
Ren and Stimpy are homeless and starving as they wander about an unnamed American city sometime in the 1950s. A dogcatcher runs over the duo with his car and sent the duo to the dog pound, despite Stimpy being a Manx cat. The other dogs live a sybarite lifestyle in their cell in the pound, which is portrayed as being like a prison (the phrase "big house" is American slang for a prison). A guard appears and takes away one of the dogs, Phil, to be "put to sleep". Ren initially does not understand the phrase, but loses his mind when he realizes that Phil was euthanized and that the same might happen to him and Stimpy.

Moments later, Stimpy throws up hairballs which covers Ren, unintentionally disguising the latter as a poodle. Ren and Stimpy are preparing for euthanasia when a young girl visiting the pound tries to adopt Ren due to his poodle disguise. Ren is amazed by his overturned fate, but in an act of compassion he pleads for the girl to adopt Stimpy as well. Ren and Stimpy are successfully adopted and enter their new home for the first time, where the mother of the girl gives Ren a sweater to wear while Stimpy is given a litter box. Grateful for having received his first material possession, Stimpy accidentally drags Ren into the litter box, much to Ren's discomfort.

== Cast ==
- John Kricfalusi as Ren
- Billy West as Stimpy
- Jim Smith as the Narrator and the Dogcatcher
- Henry Porch as Phil
- Brian Chin as Jasper
- Cheryl Chase as the Little Girl
- Lynne Naylor as Mom

== Background ==
In 1989, Spümcø was founded by John Kricfalusi, his girlfriend Lynne Naylor, and two of their friends, Bob Camp and Jim Smith. In the summer of 1989, Kricfalusi met with the producer Vanessa Coffey, who had previously worked on development on Teenage Mutant Ninja Turtles with Murakami-Wolf-Swenson, in an attempt to interest her in funding several projects he had developed while she located her position to Nickelodeon as producer for that network. Those included Jimmy's Clubhouse, starring Jimmy the Retarded Boy (later renamed Jimmy the Idiot Boy), and a series titled Your Gang. At a focus group meeting at the Sheraton Hotel at Universal City, Los Angeles, Coffey stated that Kricfalusi gave a sales pitch "so charismatic and so outrageous" that she was convinced she had to fund one of his projects. Coffey disliked the concept of Your Gang, but felt that two of the supporting characters in Your Gang, namely the dog Ren and the cat Stimpy, had potential for a series of their own. This was part of Nickelodeon's initiative to support "animator-driven cartoons", although Kricfalusi held a cynical view of this effort: "The creator-driven thing is a press invention to make people think how noble they are. What [cable networks] really wanted was hungry studios [like his] dying to break out of the mainstream who would knock themselves out to make great shows and hand over the merchandising rights."

Coffey brought Kricfalusi to a meeting of the board of directors of Nickelodeon in New York. Kricfalusi impressed the board who wanted to fund Jimmy's Clubhouse, which was his first choice. However, Kricfalusi was unwilling to sell to the Nickelodeon network the intellectual rights to Jimmy the Idiot Boy, his abrasive uncle George Liquor, and Jimmy's Canadian girlfriend Sody Pop. The network insisted on owning the intellectual rights to any characters that were to be featured in a cartoon show that aired on their network, as they were hoping to build "a permanent library of evergreen cartoons", like Disney and Warner Bros.

== Production ==
=== Development ===
Kricfalusi sold the intellectual rights for Ren and Stimpy to Nickelodeon under the grounds that they were his "second-best characters". Coffey rejected Your Gang as a TV show, but stated she was willing to fund a TV show based on Ren and Stimpy. In late 1989, Coffey agreed to fund a pilot for a TV show tentatively titled Ren Höek and Stimpy, and told Kricfalusi that if the pilot did well, she would commission a television series from his studio. Production on the pilot, titled "Big House Blues", started in December 1989.

=== Storyboard ===
The artists who worked on "Big House Blues" were Kricfalusi, Naylor, Camp and Smith. Camp described "Big House Blues" as a "nonsense story". Each of the four artists were assigned to draw what was felt to be their strongest area of expertise, with Camp drawing the comic scenes, Smith drawing the "manly" scenes with the dog catchers, Naylor drawing the "cute" scenes, and Kricfalusi drawing the "wild" scenes where Ren loses his mind at the prospect of his death. The storyboard for the episode was finished in January 1990. Half of the scenes were drawn at Spümcø in Los Angeles and the other half at Carbunkle Cartoons in Vancouver. Carbunkle had been founded in 1989 by husband-and-wife team of Bob Jaques and Kelly Armstrong. Kricfalusi and Naylor had known Jaques since they were students at Sheridan College in the 1970s.

=== Animation ===
It was expensive to pay cartoonists in American dollars and the lower value of the Canadian dollar make it profitable to sub-contract the work out to a Canadian studio. Originally, "Big House Blues" was done in an animation style similar to the Ed Benedict cartoons at Hanna-Barbera in the 1950s. Jaques persuaded Kricfalusi to switch over to a more exaggerated style. Jaques stated: "There was no way we could do that with the material on Ren & Stimpy. You couldn't just throw a timing chart on the layouts and have them inbetweened. Extreme or expressive movement and acting require extreme action". Billy West was recruited initially to provide the voices of both Ren and Stimpy, but Kricfalusi took the role of Ren for himself. West states that he believes that Kricfalusi always intended to provide the voice for Ren, and he misled the network executives by saying that West would play both parts as a way to gain the network funding. "Big House Blues" was in production for the entire first half of 1990 and cost $80,000 US dollars to make. The pilot only performed "moderately well" in testing, but Coffey was determined to support the show. She censored some of the scenes of sadistic cruelty being inflicted on Phil and changed the ending where Phil rises from the grave, which she felt undercut the gravity of Phil's death.

=== Design ===
The design of Ren and Stimpy was far more complicated in "Big House Blues" than it was in the TV show as Naylor subsequently simplified the design of the characters under the grounds that it took too much time and cost too much money to draw the characters in frame by frame as was done in the style used in "Big House Blues". In "Big House Blues", Ren and Stimpy had an "underground" look to them that was absent by "Stimpy's Big Day!", the first episode of the TV show. Naylor's redesign of the look of Ren and Stimpy was used for the rest of the show as a cost- and time-saving measure, through Kricfalusi has stated his preference for the design used in "Big House Blues" as truer to his vision of the characters.

=== Pitching ===
The network executives were displeased when they first viewed "Big House Blues" in mid-1990 as it was stated that the material was not appropriate for a television show aimed at children. The episode was heavily censored by the Nickelodeon network, which banned the scene where Ren passionately kisses Stimpy and says he loves him, as the scene implies that the duo were homosexual, despite it being portrayed as Ren doing so unconsciously. Likewise, the scene where Ren washes his mouth in the toilet was censored, though curiously it was included in the opening credits of The Ren & Stimpy Show. This has been cited as an example of the inconsistency of Broadcast Standards and Practices.

== Release ==
"Big House Blues" was played as a short in various film festivals starting on December 21, 1990. Despite concerns from Nickelodeon network executives, the reception to "Big House Blues" was very positive, with Coffey telling Kricfalusi: "The kids laughed a lot more at your cartoon than the others". In September 1990, Nickelodeon gave its approval for what is now titled The Ren & Stimpy Show to go into production, with the first episode set to premiere on August 11, 1991.

The censored version of the pilot aired on Nickelodeon on September 22, 1991 and again on August 22, 1992, the latter of which was in place of the banned episode, "Man's Best Friend", the latter episode which was initially supposed to air around that date, but was pulled due to its graphic violence, leading Nick to terminator series creator Kricfalusi and his Spümcø team. The full uncensored version would eventually air as part of the "first" episode of the short-lived Ren & Stimpy "Adult Party Cartoon", the "extreme" version and the adult-oriented spin-off of the original series, for Spike TV's animation block. The episode aired, along with the previously banned of "Man's Best Friend", on June 23, 2003, three days before the premiere of Adult Party Cartoon. Both episodes were rated TV-MA.

The episode was also released on Ren & Stimpy's first and second season DVD boxset as a bonus feature.

== Reception ==
American journalist Thad Komorowski gave the episode four out of five stars.

== Books ==
- Dobbs, G. Michael (2015). Escape – How Animation Broke into the Mainstream in the 1990s. Orlando: BearManor Media. ISBN 978-1593931100.
- Komorowski, Thad (2017). Sick Little Monkeys: The Unauthorized Ren & Stimpy Story. Albany, Georgia: BearManor Media. ISBN 978-1629331836.
