= Robin Höek =

- The Ren & Stimpy Show episode
- Episode no.: Season 1 Episode 2a
- Directed by: John Kricfalusi
- Story by: John Kricfalusi; Bob Camp
- Production code: RS-02A
- Original air date: August 25, 1991

Episode chronology
← Previous "The Big Shot!"	Next → "Nurse Stimpy"

"Robin Höek" is the third episode of the first season of The Ren & Stimpy Show. It originally aired on Nickelodeon in the United States on August 25, 1991. This episode is the first in a short-lived series of episodes called Stimpy's Storybook Land, which parody children's literature.

== Plot ==
In the present, Ren and Stimpy pray before bed. Stimpy prays for his family's and Ren's goodwill while Ren wishes for $1 million, pectoral muscles and a locked refrigerator. Ren buttons Stimpy's pajamas near his buttocks and both go to sleep.

At the middle of the night, Ren is awaken by Stimpy, who wants him to read a bedtime story. Annoyed, Ren tells him to read it himself. Stimpy reaches for his storybook, hidden in his litter box and reads the story of Robin Höek, a parody of Robin Hood.

Robin Höek was a brave hero who wears a green leotard. He is described as the greatest archer of the lands, but due to Stimpy's inability to understand the story, he is shown shooting a watermelon and chicken straight up. The watermelon lands on Robin's face, but the chicken turns into a moose and flattens him. Robin is accompanied by a group of equally eccentric friends. Robin has a crush on Maid Moron, an unattractive woman. All are portrayed by Stimpy and revealed to be actually him in different costumes, forcing him to commute frequently to fill different roles. Robin and his right-hand man Will Trunchin spend their days stealing from the rich and giving money to the poor, which was confused by Stimpy to have been cheerleaders and the criminally insane. On one occasion, Will steals the milk of a cow owned by a rich prince and his wife they were stealing from.

Maid Moron is being held hostage by an evil Sheriff (portrayed by George Liquor). Ren tries to swim across the seemingly harmless moat, only to find that the Sheriff had added blood-thirsty monks, who attack him ferociously. Ren emerges unharmed and reaches Moron, who releases a long strand of nasal hair for Ren to climb à la Rapunzel. Robin was sucked into Moron's nose, speeding up the climb, and the duo are reunited, only for the Sheriff to appear. Robin attempts to defend himself with a turkey baster (he had lost his dagger in the moat), with the juice inside incapacitating the Sheriff, who admits defeat and lets Moron go. Robin and Moron marry, and Ren wakes up just as Robin is about to kiss the bride, only to realize that they had actually married unconsciously; Ren faints at this realization, ending the episode.

An advertisement for powdered toast airs midway in the episode, with Powdered Toast Man making his first appearance as the product's mascot. Ren and Stimpy eat powdered toast on toast, which they do not find delicious until Powdered Toast Man farts on it.

== Cast ==
- Ren – voice of John Kricfalusi
- Stimpy – voice of Billy West
- George Liquor – voice of Harris Peet
- Eyeballs – voice of Henry Porch

== Production ==
Jim Smith drew the backgrounds for both of Stimpy's Storybook Land stories based on the work of N. C. Wyeth, which provided a strong atmosphere for "Robin Höek". The episode saw the first appearance of the George Liquor character despite the reservations of the show's producer, Vanessa Coffey, who made it clear that she disapproved of the character. Liquor was the favorite of the showrunner, John Kricfalusi, who insisted on including the character into The Ren & Stimpy Show over the opposition of Coffey, despite his extremely minor presence in the show. Kricfalusi complained that the mostly female network executives at Nickelodeon were opposed to his creation as he stated: "It's purely that a bunch of politically correct women see George Liquor – the ultimate, caricatured right-wing character – and they hate him".

== Reception ==
American journalist Thad Komorowski gave the episode two and a half out of five stars, writing that the backgrounds drawn by Smith were the "only redeeming quality" to the cartoon, with the jokes painfully unfunny and the story telegraphed in advance for the audience.

== Books ==
- Dobbs, G. Michael (2015). Escape – How Animation Broke into the Mainstream in the 1990s. Orlando: BearManor Media. ISBN 978-1593931100.
- Komorowski, Thad (2017). Sick Little Monkeys: The Unauthorized Ren & Stimpy Story. Albany, Georgia: BearManor Media. ISBN 978-1629331836.
