= The Mighty Ones =

2020s American animated TV series

- Genre: Fantasy; Comedy
- Created by: Sunil Hall; Lynne Naylor
- Directed by: Carder Scholin; Ben Bury; Nathan Bulmer; Erica Jones; Greg Miller
- Voices of: Josh Brener; Jimmy Tatro; Alex Cazares; Jessica McKenna; Janina Gavankar; Grey Griffin; Fryda Wolff
- Theme music composer: John Wicks
- Composer: Alec Puro
- Country of origin: United States
- Original language: English
- No. of seasons: 4
- No. of episodes: 40 (80 segments)

Production
- Executive producers: Sunil Hall; Lynne Naylor (S1–2); Greg Miller (S3)
- Running time: 23 minutes
- Production company: DreamWorks Animation Television

Original release
- Network: Hulu; Peacock
- Release: November 9, 2020 – December 9, 2022

The Mighty Ones is an American animated fantasy comedy television series produced by DreamWorks Animation Television and created by Sunil Hall and Lynne Naylor, which premiered on November 9, 2020, on Peacock and Hulu, and ran until December 9, 2022.

It is the first TV series produced by DreamWorks Animation Television since their rename to be completely original material and not based on any pre-existing property, as most of their television series are based on DreamWorks movies, books, or other franchises.

== Premise ==
The Mighty Ones follows the eponymous quartet, consisting of a twig, a pebble, a leaf, and a strawberry. These unruly friends reside in the backyard as they try to live life to the biggest.

In the first two seasons, the backyard belonged to an all-girl rock band. In the first three episodes of the third season, the band were evicted and a young hipster couple with a baby moved in. This was negated by time travel and it went back to the original status quo.

== Cast ==
- Josh Brener as Twig
- Jessica McKenna as Rocksy & Tim
- Jimmy Tatro as Bucky "Leaf"
- Alex Cazares as Verry Berry
- Janina Gavankar as Kensington
- Grey Griffin as Samosa & Percy the Pear
- Fryda Wolff as Bats
- Fred Tatasciore as Mr. Ladybug/Mr. Ladybüg, Rabbit, Jeff Berry, Prophetic Berry, Berry Patch, Matilda, Boppo, & Wheezy
- Eric Bauza as Ben the Stinkbug, Uncle Berry, The Beast, Additional voices
- Stephen Root as Bernard
- Kari Wahlgren as Shelly & Vera
- Tru Valentino as David "Dave" & Carder
- Steve Little as Dr. Clod
- Erika Ishii as Lindsay
- Keston John as Breht

=== Guest cast ===
- Brett Gelman as Egg
- Greg Cipes as Josh
- Paul Rugg as Flippy
- Manila Luzon as Firefly
- Johnny Pemberton as Gherkin
- Keston John as Ascot Pickle
- Bennie Arthur as Tam Winkwonk
- Zeno Robinson as Norman & Shanks
- Chandni Parekh as Nugget
- Kayvan Novak as The Emperor

== Episodes ==
=== Series overview ===
Season	Segments	Episodes	Originally released
1	20	10	November 9, 2020
2	20	10	July 1, 2021
3	20	10	September 1, 2022
4	20	10	December 9, 2022

=== Season 1 (2020) ===
No. overall	No. in season	Title	Directed by	Written and storyboarded by	Story by	Original release date
1	1	"Rocksy's in a Hole Lotta Trouble"	Carder Scholin	Carder Scholin	Kent Osborne	November 9, 2020
1	1	"The Great Invisi-Barrier"	Ben Bury	Ben Bury	Greg Miller	November 9, 2020
"Rocksy's in a Hole Lotta Trouble": When Rocksy sinks to the bottom of a giant pond, her friends must figure out how to rescue her. "The Great Invisi-Barrier": When an invisible force-a-wall descends on the yard and separates the Mighty Ones, Rocksy must figure out how to penetrate it so the group can reunite.
2	2	"Colossal Strawberry"	Greg Miller	Nathan Bulmer and Greg Miller	Michelle Cavin	November 9, 2020
2	2	"The Sappening"	Carder Scholin	Carder Scholin	Dani Michaeli	November 9, 2020
"Colossal Strawberry": Berry is convinced that the prophecy of the berry colossus has come true and that she's been chosen to lead her people to their true calling. "The Sappening": Twig is afraid his sapping will put the Mighty Ones in peril.
3	3	"Wad of Friendship"	Carder Scholin	Ian Mutchler and Carder Scholin	Brendan Hay	November 9, 2020
3	3	"Twig Puts Down Roots"	Ben Bury	Nathan Bulmer and Ben Bury	Michelle Cavin	November 9, 2020
"Wad of Friendship": Berry and Rocksy get attached to a piece of gum from one of the humans, and also invite their lonely friends and neighbors into the wad. "Twig Puts Down Roots": Twig thinks he's growing roots and that he will become an oak tree. The roots, however, might risk his life.
4	4	"Egg Nag"	Carder Scholin	Ben Crouse and Carder Scholin	Sunil Hall	November 9, 2020
4	4	"Game On"	Ben Bury	Ben Bury	Sunil Hall	November 9, 2020
"Egg Nag": The Mighty Ones find a trash-talking unhatched egg who scolds Twig, Leaf, and Berry, and that Rocksy must nuture. "Game On": The group find and explore a "city" (a Monopoly-like board game), but Berry eventually becomes greedy.
5	5	"Creepy Caterpillar"	Carder Scholin	Ian Mutchler and Carder Scholin	Sunil Hall, Dani Michaeli, Lynne Naylor, and Kent Osborne	November 9, 2020
5	5	"Code of Silence"	Ben Bury	Ben Bury and Erica Jones	Sunil Hall	November 9, 2020
"Creepy Caterpillar": Twig introduces Leaf to his suave caterpillar friend Josh. Leaf is calmed by the fact that he Josh can't eat leaves, but eventually the caterpillar struggles to eat him. "Code of Silence": The group must be silent for a day by order of Rabbit, to prevent him from being caught by the hawks.
6	6	"Bug Zapper"	Carder Scholin	Nathan Bulmer and Carder Scholin	Dani Michaeli	November 9, 2020
6	6	"The Helper"	Ben Bury	Gregory Leysens and Joe Uebie	Lucy Heavens	November 9, 2020
"Bug Zapper": The humans install a bug zapper on their porch, which could and can inflict the insects, especially Ladybug. "The Helper": Rocksy tries to "help" Rabbit "find" items, unaware he's actually stealing them.
7	7	"Naked Mole Wrath"	Carder Scholin	Written by : Sunil Hall and Carder Scholin; Storyboarded by : Sunil Hall, Eddie Trigueros, Carder Scholin, Lynne Naylor, Chris Reccardi, and Greg Miller	Sunil Hall, Dani Michaeli, and Lynne Naylor	November 9, 2020
7	7	"Momma Leaf"	Ben Bury	Ben Bury and Erica Jones	Richard Pursel	November 9, 2020
"Naked Mole Wrath": Hiding in fear after watching a show where a naked mole rat is "killing" their kind, the Mighty Ones, especially Rocksy, try to stop such a creature in their backyard (actually a squirrel). "Momma Leaf": Leaf sprouts eggs on his "armpits", so Twig, Rocksy, and Berry try to help him become a mother.
8	8	"Twig for a Day"	Carder Scholin	Ian Mutchler	Sunil Hall	November 9, 2020
8	8	"Eternal Day"	Ben Bury	Nathan Bulmer	Ben Crouse	November 9, 2020
"Twig For A Day": While building a dam, Rocksy, Berry, and Leaf pretend to be under Twig's shoes. "Eternal Day": Everyone can't sleep because of the "three suns" (sun lamps) from the humans, though Leaf enjoys his new buff body caused by the "suns".
9	9	"Silly Collection"	Carder Scholin	Gregory Leysens and Joe Uebie	Dani Michaeli	November 9, 2020
9	9	"Hat Wars"	Carder Scholin	Charlie Gavin	Greg Miller	November 9, 2020
"Silly Collection": Leaf has a collection of sand, but when Rocksy discovers the sand is sentient, she tries to rescue them. "Hat Wars": Verry Berry creates a new hat that everyone hates, except when Twig wears it, making Berry jealous.
10	10	"The Queen"	Ben Bury	Ben Crouse	Michelle Cavin	November 9, 2020
10	10	"A Mighty Arm"	Ben Bury	Erica Jones and Nicolette Wood	Jillian Goldfluss	November 9, 2020
"The Queen": After a group of ants steal stuff from the Mighty Ones, they must confront the Queen Ant to get their stuff back. "A Mighty Arm": When the Mighty Ones neglect Twig, they make it up to him by embarking on a dangerous adventure.

=== Season 2 (2021) ===
No. overall	No. in season	Title	Directed by	Written and storyboarded by	Story by	Original release date
11	1	"Two Twigs"	Carder Scholin	Ian Mutchler and Joe Uebie	Sunil Hall and Brendan Hay	July 1, 2021
11	1	"Fresh Coat of Paint"	Ben Bury	Nathan Bulmer and Gregory Leysens	Dani Michaeli	July 1, 2021
"Two Twigs": The Mighty Ones cannot tell the difference between Twig and a random stick bug. "Fresh Coat of Paint": Rocksy sees a fresh coat of paint spilled all over and becomes obsessed with trying to freshen up the yard.
12	2	"A Stinky Situation"	Carder Scholin	Ben Crouse and Susan Nyguen	Jillian Goldfluss	July 1, 2021
12	2	"Fire-Fly"	Ben Bury	Charlie Gavin and Kaitlyn Graziano	Sunil Hall and Greg Miller	July 1, 2021
"A Stinky Situation": Twig gets sprayed by a skunk trying to save his friends. "Fire-Fly": The Mighty Ones are cold so when they hear about a wonderful creature known as a "fire-fly", they decide it will be the answer to their problems.
13	3	"Mr. Ladybug's Secret"	Nathan Bulmer	Erica Jones and Nicolette Wood	Ben Crouse	July 1, 2021
13	3	"Wetyard"	Ben Bury	Neil Graf, Ian Mutchler, and Joe Uebie	Sunil Hall and Greg Miller	July 1, 2021
"Mr. Ladybug's Secret": When Rabbit blackmails Mr. Ladybug into doing one last job for him, Berry wants in on the action. "Wetyard": The backyard gets flooded, so Rocksy forms a crew out of the Mighty Ones and search for dry land.
14	4	"Bumbleberry"	Nathan Bulmer	Nathan Bulmer and Gregory Leysens	Dani Michaeli	July 1, 2021
14	4	"Leaf's Still Cool"	Ben Bury	Ben Crouse and Susan Nyguen	Jillian Goldfluss	July 1, 2021
"Bumbleberry": Rocksy discovers that Verry Berry is fascinated with bees. "Leaf's Still Cool": After reuniting with an old friend, Leaf goes to great, unsafe lengths to prove that he is still a cool daredevil.
15	5	"Unintended Bunnyness"	Nathan Bulmer	Charlie Gavin and Kaitlyn Graziano	Sunil Hall, Dani Michaeli, and Lynne Naylor	July 1, 2021
15	5	"Berry's Pet Threat"	Erica Jones	Erica Jones and Nicolette Wood	Jillian Goldfluss	July 1, 2021
"Unintended Bunnyness": Twig accidentally discovers Easter when he gets covered in dryer lint. "Berry's Pet Threat": When Berry forms a close bond with a crow that follows her around like a pet, Rocksy tries to convince Berry that it is only following her around because it is trying to eat her.
16	6	"Shiny Leaf"	Nathan Bulmer	Ian Wasseluk	Kent Osborne	July 1, 2021
16	6	"Roundy"	Erica Jones	Neil Graf and Gregory Leysens	Dani Michaeli	July 1, 2021
"Shiny Leaf": Leaf freaks out when he finds a blemish on his butt before a body building competition. "Roundy": Berry gets jealous when Rocksy starts spending all of her time with a marble, and tries various attempts to make the marble "disappear".
17	7	"The Great Grape Rescue"	Nathan Bulmer and Ben Bury	Ben Crouse and Ian Mutchler	Richard Pursel	July 1, 2021
17	7	"Sneezyitis"	Erica Jones	Dodge Greenley	Jillian Goldfluss	July 1, 2021
"The Great Grape Rescue": The Mighty Ones meet a courageous grape who inspires them to try to rescue his whole bunch. "Sneezyitis": When the Mighty Ones, except for Rocksy, all mysteriously get sick at the same time, they begin to fear that they have become allergic to Rocksy.
18	8	"Verry Berry Gets It Together"	Nathan Bulmer	Erica Jones and Nicolette Wood	Katherine Nolfi	July 1, 2021
18	8	"Fur Mountain"	Erica Jones	Charlie Gavin	Charley Feldman	July 1, 2021
"Verry Berry Gets It Together": When Verry Berry's adventurous spirit gets her in trouble, she joins up with a colony of army ants to learn discipline. "Fur Mountain": Twig disappears into the coat of a dog and co-habitates with a bunch of fleas.
19	9	"House Touchers"	Nathan Bulmer	Neil Graf and Gregory Leysens	Adeline Colangelo	July 1, 2021
19	9	"The Transformation"	Nathan Bulmer and Erica Jones	Dodge Greenley	Adeline Colangelo	July 1, 2021
"House Touchers": When Rocksy is accidentally flung inside the humans' house, Berry and Twig go on a wild adventure to bring her back. "The Transformation": Rocksy is upset when she finds out all her friends will evolve, but she will always be a pebble.
20	10	"Ice, Ice Berry"	Nathan Bulmer	Ben Crouse	Marie Cheng	July 1, 2021
20	10	"Venomous Bush Viper"	Erica Jones	Charlie Gavin and Nicolette Wood	Sunil Hall	July 1, 2021
"Ice, Ice, Berry": After an ice storm coats the yard in the slippery stuff, Leaf convinces the Mighty Ones that their reflections are evil doppelgangers. "Venomous Bush Viper": When a venomous bush viper swallows Rocksy, the Mighty Ones must venture into the snake's stomach.

=== Season 3 (2022) ===
No. overall	No. in season	Title	Directed by	Written and storyboarded by	Story by	Original release date
21	1	"Rude-a-Snakening"	Nathan Bulmer	Nathan Bulmer	Sunil Hall	September 1, 2022
21	1	"Afteryard"	Erica Jones	Erica Jones	Ben Bury	September 1, 2022
"Rude-a-Snakening": After being stuck inside a snake, the Mighty Ones escape, but the yard that was their home has changed. "Afteryard": The newly renovated yard is inhospitable, but the Mighty Ones find a paradise.
22	2	"Too Many Bens"	Gina Gress	Haewon Lee	Dani Michaeli	September 1, 2022
22	2	"Dance of the Machines"	Nathan Bulmer	Ben Crouse	Greg Miller	September 1, 2022
"Too Many Bens!": A lack of predators in the new yard has led to an infestation of Bens, and they are looking for playmates. "Dance of the Machines": The new humans that live in the house notice there's dirt in their yard, so they release a cleaning robot that becomes a deadly menace.
23	3	"Fleshbeast"	Erica Jones	Charlie Gavin	Dani Michaeli and Lynn Naylor	September 1, 2022
23	3	"Time Leafer"	Gina Gress	Alex Cline	Dani Michaeli and Stephanie Streisand	September 1, 2022
"Fleshbeast": The Mighty Ones are terrorized by the human baby that runs amok through the yard, but Rocksy is drawn to its power. "Time Leafer": Everyone thinks Leaf has become loopy, but his theories about time travel might just be what the Mighty Ones need.
24	4	"Clickety Clacks"	Nathan Bulmer	Rose Feduk	Jessica Combs	September 1, 2022
24	4	"Rocksy's Thing"	Erica Jones	Kaitlyn Granziano	Jessica Combs	September 1, 2022
"Clickety Clacks": Rocksy's "talent" goes to her head when she and Berry accidentally invent tap dancing. "Rocksy's Thing": Rocksy finds one end of a shoelace and tasks her friends with helping her free it so she can have a thing of her very own.
25	5	"Twig Tat"	Nathan Bulmer	Neil Graf	Stephanie Streisand	September 1, 2022
25	5	"The Gnome"	Erica Jones	Toby Jones	Jessica Combs and Sunil Hall	September 1, 2022
"Twig Tat": After getting advice from the Yard Tree, Twig gets a tattoo carve and keeps getting more, but ends up going too far. "The Gnome": Upon finding a giant, offensive garden gnome, the Mighty Ones debate whether to destroy it or consider it art.
26	6	"Gherkin Returns"	Gina Gress	Derek Evanick and Diana Lafyatis	Jessica Combs	September 1, 2022
26	6	"This Blows"	Gina Gress	Chris Pianka	Frank Gibson	September 1, 2022
"Gherkin Returns": The fifth Mighty One, Gherkin, visits for the weekend, but Berry is perplexed to discover that he has changed. "This Blows": The Mighty Ones The Mighty Ones get stuck in a vortex created by a leaf blower war between neighbours.
27	7	"Big Busyness"	Erica Jones	Ben Crouse	Stephanie Streisand	September 1, 2022
27	7	"Foam Party"	Nathan Bulmer	Chris Pianka	Jessica Combs	September 1, 2022
"Big Busyness": When Leaf meets an ambitious Coffee Bean, he learns the highs and lows of business. "Foam Party": Everyone is mad at Rocksy, so she tries to make it up to them by creating fun foam to play in.
28	8	"The Ripening"	Gina Gress	Charlie Gavin	Greg Miller	September 1, 2022
28	8	"Maraca Rock"	Nathan Bulmer	Alex Cline	Jessica Combs	September 1, 2022
"The Ripening": Berry is invited to her family's annual celebration, which she finds tedious, but the Mighty Ones are excited to join. "Maraca Rock": Rocksy swaps lives with a maraca bead for the day.
29	9	"The Night Pig"	Erica Jones	Charlie Jackson	Stephanie Streisand	September 1, 2022
29	9	"Twigula"	Gina Gress	Rose Feduk	Mercedes Valle	September 1, 2022
"The Night Pig": Kensington is terrorized by her overactive imagination when a possum comes into the yard and tangles with the Mighty Ones. "Twigula": Berry mistakenly thinks that Twig is a juice sucker and tries to convince him to make her into one too.
30	10	"Mystery! On the Yard Express"	Erica Jones	Carder Scholin	Jessica Combs	September 1, 2022
30	10	"Lindsay Joins the Band"	Nathan Bulmer	Neil Graf	Jessica Combs	September 1, 2022
"Mystery! On The Yard Express": While passengers aboard a fancy train, the Mighty Ones become part of a classic whodunit. "Lindsay Joins The Band: With an impending visit from Breht's mother, Lindsay discovers she has more fun with her next-door neighbours.

=== Season 4 (2022) ===
No. overall	No. in season	Title	Directed by	Written and storyboarded by	Story by	Original release date
31	1	"Battle of the Babies"	Gina Gress	Kaitlyn Graziano	Frank Gibson	December 9, 2022
31	1	"Norman"	Nathan Bulmer	Sam Spina	Stephanie Streisand	December 9, 2022
"Battle of the Babies": Rocksy's rapport with Lindsay and Breht's now feral baby inspires her friends. "Norman": Twig and Leaf reunite with their brother Norman and compete to win his affection.
32	2	"Party Twig"	Erica Jones	Dodge Greenley and Amy Hudkins	Jessica Combs	December 9, 2022
32	2	"Space Blasters"	Gina Gress	Gina Gress and Roan Everly	Ben Bury and Dani Michaeli	December 9, 2022
"Party Twig": Cicadas hatch and due to a misunderstanding, they anoint Twig their Party God, leaving Rocksy, Berry and Leaf in charge of keeping Twig alive. "Space Blasters": The Mighty Ones have an adventure in "space."
33	3	"Splintered"	Nathan Bulmer	Sam Spina	Jessica Combs	December 9, 2022
33	3	"In the Pit"	Erica Jones	Charlie Jackson	Jessica Combs	December 9, 2022
"Splintered": Berry gets a splinter and removing it is difficult. "In The Pit": Twig falls into a compost bin, which turns out to be a fighting pit where he must face his cowardice and fight his way out.
34	4	"Berry's Bunker"	Gina Gress	Ben Crouse	Jessica Combs	December 9, 2022
34	4	"Matilda's Birthday"	Nathan Bulmer	Charlie Gavin	Stephanie Streisand	December 9, 2022
"Berry's Bunker": An impending threat leads Rocksy, Leaf and Twig to beg Berry to share her secret underground bunker. "Matilda's Birthday: The Mighty Ones throw competing surprise parties for Matilda's birthday.
35	5	"Clover"	Erica Jones	Alex Cline	Stephanie Streisand	December 9, 2022
35	5	"The Moss"	Gina Gress	Rose Feduk	Jessica Combs	December 9, 2022
"Clover": A lucky clover offers to help Twig for a day, but once he's had a taste of good fortune, Twig has a hard time letting go. "The Moss": Leaf becomes obsessed with watching the lives of the microbes that live in Rocksy's moss.
36	6	"Shellabyrinth"	Nathan Bulmer	Kaitlyn Graziano	Stephanie Streisand	December 9, 2022
36	6	"Helping Hans"	Erica Jones	Chris Pianka	Matt Thornton	December 9, 2022
"Shellabyrinth": Berry runs away from responsibility, only to learn her lesson and then totally disregard it because being responsible is a trap. "Helping Hans": The Mighty Ones meet a multi-tool named Hans and find uses for his various attachments.
37	7	"Twig Is Dead"	Gina Gress	Kaitlyn Graziano	Jessica Combs	December 9, 2022
37	7	"Message Slab"	Nathan Bulmer	Derek Evanick and Diana Lafytis	Frank Gibson	December 9, 2022
"Twig Is Dead": Thinking Twig died under wet cement, the Mighty Ones make a statue and give him a funeral. "Message Slab": A phone falls into the yard while in autoplay mode; Twig and the others think the videos are instructions for living.
38	8	"Sacred Cup"	Erica Jones	Sam Spina	Stephanie Streisand	December 9, 2022
38	8	"My Fair Berry"	Gina Gress	Carder Scholin	Stephanie Streisand	December 9, 2022
"Sacred Cup": Wanting a better way to drink water, the Mighty Ones go on a quest for a cup. "My Fair Berry": Flowers invites Berry to the Bloomers Ball.
39	9	"Pantsquest"	Nathan Bulmer	Ben Crouse	Dani Michaeli	December 9, 2022
39	9	"Berry's Brain"	Erica Jones	Charlie Gavin	Brian Wysol	December 9, 2022
"Pantsquest": A simple brunch causes Leaf to embark on a dangerous search for cool pants. "Berry's Brain": Twig is the only one who knows that Berry's brain is being eaten by a parasitic worm that is making her act nicer than usual.
40	10	"Chompers for Cobcorn"	Gina Gress	Ben Crouse	Greg Miller	December 9, 2022
40	10	"Boat Day"	Nathan Bulmer	Rose Feduk	Dani Michaeli	December 9, 2022
"Chompers for Cobcorn": Bernard steals Rabbit's teeth, and when Berry gets mistaken as an accomplice, they go on the run together. "Boat Day": Berry's head grows to a monstrous size and keeps growing. Note: This is the series finale.

== Production ==
=== Development ===
The show was originally pitched to Nickelodeon, but rejected.

On January 16, 2020, it was announced that Peacock has announced that it had greenlit the series alongside Trolls: TrollsTopia and Madagascar: A Little Wild. The next day, Hulu announced that it would be the exclusive streaming service for newer DreamWorks Animation series with Sunil Hall and Lynne Naylor-Reccardi producing the series.

== Accolades ==
Year	Award	Category	Nominee(s)	Result
2021	Emmy Award	Outstanding Voice Directing for a Daytime Animated Series	Sirena Irwin	Nominated
