= Lynne Naylor =

Canadian animator

- Born: Lynne Rae Naylor; Vancouver, British Columbia, Canada
- Other names: Lynn Naylor; Lynne Naylor-Reccardi
- Education: Sheridan College
- Occupations: Artist; Animator; Writer; Director; Producer; Executive Producer; Voice Actress
- Years active: 1981–present
- Known for: The Mighty Ones; The Ren & Stimpy Show; The Powerpuff Girls; SpongeBob SquarePants; Hi Hi Puffy AmiYumi; Super Robot Monkey Team Hyperforce Go!
- Spouse: Chris Reccardi (m. 1994; died 2019)
- Children: 1

Lynne Rae Naylor is a Canadian animator, artist, designer, television director, television producer, and voice actress. She is best known for co-creating DreamWorks' The Mighty Ones, co-founding the animation studio Spümcø with John Kricfalusi, Bob Camp, and Jim Smith, and co-developing The Ren & Stimpy Show for Nickelodeon. She also worked on Batman: The Animated Series, The Powerpuff Girls, Samurai Jack, Super Robot Monkey Team Hyperforce Go!, Hi Hi Puffy AmiYumi, My Life as a Teenage Robot, and Wander Over Yonder.

== Career ==
Naylor attended Sheridan College. During her time at Sheridan College in the 1970s, she started dating John Kricfalusi and when Kricfalusi was expelled, she followed him to Hollywood, getting hired at Filmation. Kricfalusi was a rebellious student who openly questioned the ability and competence of his professors, saying that none of the academics knew anything about animation, a stance that made him popular with his fellow students but led directly to his expulsion. In 1981, she worked on Kricfalusi's first short film, Ted Bakes One. In 1985, she went with Kricfalusi to Taiwan to supervise the revived version by the Hanna-Barbera studio of The Jetsons which was being drawn in Taiwan by the Cuckoo's Nest to save money. It was a standard practice in American animation to subcontract out the laborious and time-consuming task of drawing a cartoon frame by frame to Asian animation studios, whose cartoonists were paid lower wages than American cartoonists as a cost-saving measure. However, the Hanna-Barbera studio had doubts about the competence of the poorly paid Taiwanese animators and sent out Western animators such as Kricfalusi and Naylor to supervise their work.

After Kricfalusi was fired in Taiwan for his practice of redrawing already finished cartoons, she followed him back to Hollywood. In 1986, Ralph Bakshi was hired to direct a music video for the Rolling Stones song "Harlem Shuffle". Bakshi in turn assigned Kricfalusi to direct the animated portions of the video for "Harlem Shuffle", and he in turn assigned Naylor to do the design and much of the drawings for the video. Naylor drew the buxom Afro-American girl featured in the video. The cartoon for "Harlem Shuffle" featured a black girl in Harlem being avidly pursued by two tomcats, both of which display stereotypical behavior commonly associated with sexually aggressive black men. The success of the "Harlem Shuffle" video led to Bakshi becoming interested in doing animated films again, and he decided to direct an animated sex comedy set in the 1960s titled Bobby's Girl. Both Kricfalusi and Naylor were heavily involved in the drawings for Bobby's Girl, but the film was aborted in early 1987 when the Tri-Star studio decided not to cut its funding for the film. In 1987, Bakshi won the contract to draw Mighty Mouse: The New Adventures for the CBS network, and made Kricfalusi one of his directors. Naylor was assigned by him to work as one of his cartoonists.

She co-founded Spümcø along with her then-boyfriend John Kricfalusi, Jim Smith and Bob Camp in 1989. She was involved in the development of Ren & Stimpy. Kricfaulsi based the character of Ren on himself and Stimpy on Naylor. About Kricfalusi's admission in the documentary Happy Happy Joy Joy: The Ren and Stimpy Story that he based Stimpy on Naylor, the American critic Gary Kramer wrote: "Stimpy seems to love Ren no matter how much he is slapped around and abused. Their codependent relationship is obviously steeped in painful truth." In 1989, the Spümcø studio was commissioned by the producer Vanessa Coffey to do a pilot episode for what was then known Ren Höek & Stimpy. Coffey stated if the pilot did well, she would commission a TV series. Starting in December 1989, Naylor was heavily involved in drawing the pilot Big House Blues. In the Big House Blues, Kricfalusi drew the "wild" scenes, Camp drew the comedic scenes, Smith drew the "manly" scenes and Naylor drew the "cute" scenes. The success of Big House Blues, which was shown as a short film at various film festivals in 1990, led to a TV series being commissioned in September 1990. Naylor played a key role in streamlining and simplifying the design of Ren and Stimpy from how the characters were shown in the Big House Blues to how they were portrayed in the TV show as the original design took too much time to draw in frame by frame. Kricfalusi has expressed criticism of the simplified design of the characters that Naylor established as a degradation of quality.

Naylor was famed at the Spümcø studio for her drawings of "sexy girls" as her fellow Spümcø cartoonist and future husband Chris Reccardi praised her ability to "exude pure sensuality and innocence at the same time" in her drawings of female characters. Ren & Stimpy was criticized for violence with adult, bathroom, dark and sexual humor that TV scarcely uses; it received critical acclaim and inspired more innovative satirical cartoons such as Beavis and Butt-Head, Rocko's Modern Life, South Park, Family Guy, and SpongeBob SquarePants.

During the production of the episode Stimpy's Big Day, Naylor's relationship with Kricfalusi experienced serious strains as she accused him of not doing enough to meet the deadline for the premiere set for 11 August 1991. David Koenigsberg of the Spümcø studio recalled: "She was building up with all this tension because she felt the deadlines much more oppressively than John did." Koenigsberg recalled that the other animators would laugh and joke while working, but Naylor "was like the uptight librarian reminding everyone 'we have to go back to work now'. She was serious, it was not a joke. I remember talking to her one day about how we should laugh at this, and she really couldn't". In March 1991, Naylor broke up with Kricfalusi and left The Ren & Stimpy Show. Naylor had completed the layout drawings for Stimpy's Big Day at the time she left the show. Kricfalusi spread rumors that Naylor "was just the girlfriend" who had done nothing for The Ren & Stimpy Show in an attempt to deprive her of employment in the animation industry. On 18 May 1993, Kricfaulsi's lawyer sent a letter to the Nickelodeon network threatening to sue if Chris Reccardi was credited as the co-director for The Royal Canadian Kilted Yaksmen. Jim Ballantine stated that the letter was due to jealousy as Reccardi was dating Naylor. Ballantine stated: "Since Chris was in a serious relationship with Lynne Naylor, anything having to do with Chris made John extra nuts."

She also produced and directed the film Hercules and Xena – The Animated Movie: The Battle for Mount Olympus. Her biggest roles in character designs were for The Powerpuff Girls, Samurai Jack, Star Wars: Clone Wars, Foster's Home for Imaginary Friends, Hi Hi Puffy AmiYumi, and more. Naylor and Sunil Hall created the DreamWorks series The Mighty Ones for Hulu and Peacock in 2020.

She had also co-created the failed Nickelodeon pilot The Modifyers with her husband Chris Reccardi in 2007.

== Filmography ==
=== Film ===
Year	Title	Role
1982	The Smurfs Christmas Special	Layout Artist
1990	Roller Coaster Rabbit	Story
1992	The Kingdom Chums: Original Top Ten	Layout Artist
1993	Nick and Noel	Model Designer
1998	Hercules and Xena – The Animated Movie: The Battle for Mount Olympus	Director, Art Director, & Producer
2009	Monsters vs. Aliens	Additional Character Designer
2009	The Haunted World of El Superbeasto	Character Designer
2018	Hotel Transylvania 3: Summer Vacation	Storyboard Artist
2019	The Lego Movie 2: The Second Part	Visual Development Artist
2019	Lucky	Character Designer
2020	Happy Happy Joy Joy: The Ren and Stimpy Story	Herself

=== Television ===
Year	Title	Role	Notes
1984	Heathcliff & the Catillac Cats	Assistant Character Designer	N/A
1984	Snorks	Layout Artist	N/A
1985	The Jetsons	Layout Artist & Character Designer	N/A
1987	Mighty Mouse: The New Adventures	Layout Artist	N/A
1988	The New Adventures of Beany and Cecil	Character Designer & Layout Artist	N/A
1991–1996	The Ren & Stimpy Show	Developer; Voice Actress ("Big House Blues"); Animator (1990; 1992); Layout Artist (1990–1991; 1994); Big-Shot (1991); Character Designer (1991–1992); Background Designer ("Ren's Retirement"); Director (1994); Writer (1994); Storyboard Artist (1994); Story (1994)	Mom
1992	Tiny Toon Adventures	Character Layout Artist	N/A
1992–1993	Batman: The Animated Series	Character Designer	N/A
1993	Animaniacs	Model Designer	N/A
1995	The Shnookums & Meat Funny Cartoon Show	Art Director	N/A
1995–1996	The Twisted Tales of Felix the Cat	Writer (1995); Character Designer (uncredited) (1995); Layout Artist (uncredited) (1995–1996); Background Artist (uncredited) (1995–1996); Director (1995)	N/A
1996	What a Cartoon!	Additional Layout Artist ("Buy One, Get One Free")	N/A
1998–2001	The Powerpuff Girls	Modeler, Storyboard Artist; Writer	N/A
1998–1999	Cow and Chicken	Storyboard Artist	N/A
1998–1999	I Am Weasel	Storyboard Artist	N/A
2001	The Cartoon Cartoon Show	Background Artist, Clean-Up Artist, Layout Artist, Modeling, & Art Director ("IMP Inc.")	N/A
2001	The Ripping Friends	Layout Artist (Uncredited)	N/A
2001–2004; 2017	Samurai Jack	Character Designer	N/A
2003–2005	Star Wars: Clone Wars	Character Designer	N/A
2004–2005	Foster's Home for Imaginary Friends	Character Designer	N/A
2004–2006	Hi Hi Puffy AmiYumi	Character Designer	N/A
2004–2006	Super Robot Monkey Team Hyperforce Go!	Art Director; Character Designer ("The Stranded Seven")	N/A
2005	My Life as a Teenage Robot	Character Designer	N/A
2008–2009	The Mighty B!	Storyboard Artist ("Season 1")	N/A
2008–2010	Chowder	Art Director & Story writer ("The Garden")	N/A
2010	Breaking the Mold: The Re-Making of Mighty Mouse	Herself & Special Thanks	N/A
2010	My Little Pony: Friendship Is Magic	Character Designer	N/A
2010–2013	Fish Hooks	Production Designer (Seasons 1-2)	N/A
2014	Wander Over Yonder	Character Designer ("The Bounty/The Ball")	N/A
2015–2016	SpongeBob SquarePants	Storyboard Artist ("Season 9") (Note: Information comes from the opening credits of each episode she worked on.)	N/A
2020–2022	The Mighty Ones	Co-creator; Executive Producer (Seasons 1-2); Story (Seasons 1-3); Storyboard Artist ("Naked Mole Wrath"); Creative Consultant (Seasons 3-4) (Note: Information comes from the end credits of each episode from those seasons.)	N/A

== Awards and nominations ==
List of awards nominations.
Award	Year (Note: Year in which awards ceremony was held.)	Category	Work(s)	Episode	Fellow Nominees	Results
Primetime Emmy Awards	1994	Outstanding Animated Program (For Programming One Hour or Less)	The Ren & Stimpy Show	Ren's Retirement	Bob Camp, Jim Gomez, Ron Hauge, Bill Wray, Vanessa Coffey, & Jim Ballantine	Nominated
Annie Awards	2002	Annie Award for Outstanding Achievement for Character Design in an Animated Television/Broadcast Production	Samurai Jack	Jack and the Warrior Woman	N/A	Won
Annie Awards	2004	Annie Award for Outstanding Achievement for Character Design in an Animated Television/Broadcast Production	Foster's Home for Imaginary Friends	House of Bloo's	N/A	Nominated

== Sources ==
- Komorowski, Thad (2017). Sick Little Monkeys: The Unauthorized Ren & Stimpy Story. BearManor Media.
