= Stimpy's Big Day! =

- The Ren & Stimpy Show episode
- Title card
- Episode no.: Season 1 Episode 1a
- Directed by: John Kricfalusi
- Story by: John Kricfalusi; Vincent Waller
- Production code: RS-01B
- Original air date: August 11, 1991

Episode chronology
← Previous "Big House Blues"	Next → "The Big Shot!"

"Stimpy's Big Day!" is the first episode of the first season of The Ren & Stimpy Show. It originally aired on Nickelodeon in the United States on August 11, 1991.

== Plot ==
Ren and Stimpy live together in a caravan. Ren berates Stimpy for spending too much time watching cartoons on television and, in particular, The Muddy Mudskipper Show. Ironically, the show is depicted as a live action show in-universe. The show holds a contest organized by the Gritty Kitty Litter company, with contestants having to write a poem praising the product in 40 million words or fewer. The winner is promised $47 million, a lifetime supply of goat cheese, records of 1970s hit pop songs, and a visit to Hollywood, where the winner will appear as a special guest on the show.

Believing the contest to be a scam due to its nonsensical nature, Ren attempts to convince Stimpy to quit and breaks off their friendship. To Ren's astonishment, Stimpy wins the contest and the show's presenters actually show up to deliver on their promise. Consumed by greed, Ren attempts to pass off as Stimpy to claim the money, only for Stimpy to leave for Hollywood. Ren angrily watches him leave, only to realize the error of his ways, and breaks down in tears.

In Hollywood, Stimpy is ecstatic to have finally met Muddy Mudskipper, revealed to be an actual mudskipper and not a cartoon character. Stimpy interviews Muddy five minutes before airtime, which quickly devolves into a series of non sequiturs. Stimpy gets pulled into an arduous make-up routine and finally appears on television. Stimpy attempts to speak into the microphone, only for it to get stuck in his nose. Muddy comments on Stimpy's stupidity.

A fictional advertisement depicting a log as a toy airs midway between the episode. The story continues with the next episode, "The Big Shot!".

== Cast ==
- John Kricfalusi as Ren
- Billy West as Stimpy
- Harris Peet as Muddy Mudskipper
- Darrin Sargent as TV Announcer
- Vincent Waller as the pillow

== Production ==
Production started in October 1990 in order to meet the scheduled premiere in August 1991. After The Ren & Stimpy Show was approved by the network in September 1990, Spümcø hired new animators in order to kick off the series' production. Most of the people whom John Kricfalusi hired were artists who had previously worked with Kricfalusi on The New Adventures of Beany and Cecil in 1988. Painter Teale Wang recalled in 2009 that Kricfalusi had an unorthodox way of recruiting artists, as she stated that, in early 1991, "John offered me a full-time job, but I told him I was going back to The Simpsons. He looked at me and said, 'oh, I get it. You like it safe. You don't like to take chances. I understand'. I got so pissed off, I told him to fuck off and that I'd take his job! I was actually shaking. He knew exactly what he was doing. I only knew him two weeks, but he had figured me out in two minutes". In its early days, Spümcø was described as more as a "mom-and-pop shop", and not until the first months of 1991 did the studio operate more like a conventional animation studio.

Much of the episode was drawn by Kricfalusi and Lynne Naylor, co-founders of Spümcø. Naylor simplified the design of Ren and Stimpy from their look in their debut in the 1990 pilot episode "Big House Blues" under the grounds that it took too much time and was too expensive to draw the characters in frame by frame as was done in style of the "Big House Blues". In "Big House Blues", Ren and Stimpy had an "underground" look that was gone by "Stimpy's Big Day!". Naylor argued that a simpler design was needed to save money and time. This was especially the case with Ren as he was notoriously difficult to draw properly, and many cartoonists have failed at drawing Ren. Naylor's redesign of Ren and Stimpy became the norm for the rest of the show, though Kricfalusi has expressed preference for the original look of the duo in "Big House Blues".

Production was greatly hindered when Naylor broke up with Kricfalusi in March 1991, after which she left Spümcø and would not be involved with The Ren & Stimpy Show until after Kricfalusi's firing. Working on "Stimpy's Big Day!" imposed serious strains on their relationships as Naylor was far more committed to reaching the deadlines imposed by the studio than Kricfalusi (a factor that contributed to his later firing by Nickelodeon). David Koenigsberg of Spümcø recalled: "She was building up with all this tension because she felt the deadlines much more oppressively than John did". Koenigsberg recalled that the other animators would laugh and joke while working, but Naylor "was like the uptight librarian reminding everyone 'we have to go back to work now'. She was serious, it was not a joke. I remember talking to her one day about how we should laugh at this, and she really couldn't". Naylor had completed the layouts for "Stimpy's Big Day!" when she broke up with Kricfalusi. However, despite the break-up, Naylor played a major role in "Stimpy's Big Day!" as she drew the opening scene where Ren criticizes Stimpy for watching cartoons too much, which established a dynamic that continued for the rest of the show. Both Kricfalusi and Naylor had been born in the 1950s, and as result the couple set "Stimpy's Big Day!" sometime in the 1950s as a tribute to the world of their youth. Despite this, in the episode itself, one of the prizes listed for the winner of the poem contest is "a 12-hour record set of the top hits of the 70s."

The work of inking and painting both "Stimpy's Big Day!" and "The Big Shot!" was done at Lacewood Productions in Ottawa. The studio had a hostile working environment, paid its employees poorly, and its output was subpar. Despite Kricfalusi approving of their work, the studio backed out after the first season.

== Reception ==
American journalist Thad Komorowski gave the episode four out of five stars. Karen Schomer, television critic of The New York Times, noted in 1992 that the episode showcased how the show was different from other animated series at the time, with its gross-out humor, the characters' distinct lack of good will, and self-awareness contributing to its popularity amongst older audiences. The American critic Matt Langer wrote that, in "Stimpy's Big Day!", "Kricfalusi constantly made reference to the detritus of American culture, and deliberately violated norms of good taste."

== Books ==
- Dobbs, G. Michael (2015). Escape – How Animation Broke into the Mainstream in the 1990s. Orlando: BearManor Media. ISBN 978-1593931100.
- Langer, Matt (June 1993). "Animatophilia, Cultural Production and Corporate Interests: The Case of 'Ren & Stimpy'". Film History. 5 (2): 125–141.
- Komorowski, Thad (2017). Sick Little Monkeys: The Unauthorized Ren & Stimpy Story. Albany, Georgia: BearManor Media. ISBN 978-1629331836.
