= Jim Ballantine (producer) =

American film producer (born 1955)

- Born: James Ballantine; August 30, 1955 (age 70); Waimea, Hawaii, U.S.
- Occupation: Film producer

James Ballantine (born August 30, 1955) is an American film producer who is credited on multiple animated features and TV series, and whose first animation job was a production administrator on Disney's The Little Mermaid.

Ballantine's credits at Nickelodeon and DisneyToon Studios include The Ren & Stimpy Show (1991–95), DisneyToon Studios' Bambi II (2006),(also 2006), and the Rayman series.

The Ren & Stimpy Show was nominated for Emmy Award in both 1993 and 1994 with Ballantine contributing to the series during that period. He was in charge of production at Acme Filmworks in 2005–06.

== Filmography ==
=== Producer ===
- The Ren & Stimpy Show (1991–1996)
- Mickey's Once Upon a Christmas (1999)
- Bambi II (2006)
- Brother Bear 2 (2006)
- Heidi (2015–2016)
- Blinky Bill the Movie (2015)

=== Executive producer ===
- Rayman: The Animated Series (1999)
- The Woodlies (2012)
- The Woodlies Movie (2012)
- Vic the Viking (2013–2014)
- Maya the Bee Movie (2014)
- Tashi (2014–2015)

=== Miscellaneous crew ===
- The Little Mermaid (1989)

== Sources ==
- Jim Ballantine at Variety.com
- Jim Ballantine in the Hollywood Reporter
- Jim Ballantine at AWN.com
