= Vanessa Coffey =

American film producer

- Born: June 13, 1958 (age 68)
- Occupation: Film producer
- Years active: 1979–present
- Known for: The Ren & Stimpy Show; Doug; Rugrats; Rocko's Modern Life
- Awards: 2 Daytime Emmy Awards; 1 CableACE Award

Vanessa Coffey (born June 13, 1958) is an American television producer and co-founder of the Nickelodeon Animation Studio best known for her work on Rugrats, The Ren & Stimpy Show, Doug, and Rocko's Modern Life. Coffey has won two Daytime Emmy Awards and a CableACE Award.

== Career ==
=== Marvel Animation ===
Coffey's film career began at Marvel Animation working on television shows including Transformers, G.I. Joe, Muppet Babies and Defenders of the Earth. Coffey later moved to Murakami-Wolf-Swenson where she worked on the development of the television show Teenage Mutant Ninja Turtles.

=== Nickelodeon and Nicktoons ===
Coffey says that after leaving Murakami-Wolf-Swenson, she did not want to do animation anymore because everything was either modeled after pre-existing comic strips or a vessel for selling related products. Coffey decided that she wanted to bring back original animation and called Debbie Beece at Nickelodeon. Coffey was told that Nickelodeon could not afford animation at the time, but she could produce a special for them. She produced Nick's Thanksgiving Fest in 1988 as an independent contractor. It was only the second time that the studio had done animation. After the success of the special, Nickelodeon contracted with Coffey to develop Nicktoons with original, creator-driven ideas.

Coffey developed three ideas to fill the 90-minute time slot allocated to Nicktoons – Rugrats, The Ren & Stimpy Show and Doug. All three shows were successful and are credited with beginning Nickelodeon's "golden age of cartoons". Coffey calls the variety of the three shows "a balanced meal" for kids. Between the pilots and series' production, Coffey was hired as Nickelodeon's Vice President of Animation.

Of being able to create original programming for Nicktoons, Coffey says, "I was in the right place at the right time." Arlene Klasky, co-creator of Rugrats, and Jim Jinkins, creator of Doug, credit Coffey for enabling them to get their shows off the ground and into the homes of millions around the world.

== Awards and nominations ==
List of awards and nominations.
Organization	Year (Note: Year in which awards ceremony was held.)	Work(s)	Category	Result
Primetime Emmy Awards	1995	Rugrats for episode "Passover"	Outstanding Animated Program (For Programming One Hour or Less)	Nominated
Primetime Emmy Awards	1994	The Ren & Stimpy Show for episode "Ren's Retirement"	Outstanding Animated Program (For Programming One Hour or Less)	Nominated
Primetime Emmy Awards	1993	The Ren & Stimpy Show for episode "Son of Stimpy"	Outstanding Animated Program (For Programming One Hour or Less)	Nominated
Primetime Emmy Awards	1992	The Ren & Stimpy Show	Outstanding Animated Program (For Programming One Hour or Less)	Nominated
CableACE Awards	1995	Rocko's Modern Life	Animated Programming Special or Series	Nominated
CableACE Awards	1994	Rugrats	Animated Programming Special or Series	Won
CableACE Awards	1994	Doug	Animated Programming Special or Series	Nominated
CableACE Awards	1994	The Ren & Stimpy Show	Animated Programming Special or Series	Nominated
CableACE Awards	1993	The Ren & Stimpy Show	Animated Programming Special or Series	Nominated
Daytime Emmy Awards	1995	Rugrats	Outstanding Animated Children's Program	Nominated
Daytime Emmy Awards	1994	Rugrats	Outstanding Animated Children's Program	Won
Daytime Emmy Awards	1993	Doug	Outstanding Animated Children's Program	Nominated
Daytime Emmy Awards	1993	Rugrats	Outstanding Animated Children's Program	Nominated
Daytime Emmy Awards	1992	Rugrats	Outstanding Animated Children's Program	Won
Daytime Emmy Awards	1992	Doug	Outstanding Animated Children's Program	Nominated

== Filmography ==
Year	Work	Role	Notes
1987–1988	Teenage Mutant Ninja Turtles	Production manager	TV series
1989	Nick's Thanksgiving Fest	Producer	TV special
1990	Big House Blues	Executive producer	Film short
1991–1994	Doug	Executive producer	TV series
1991–1995	Rugrats	Executive producer	TV series
1991–1996	The Ren & Stimpy Show	Executive producer	TV series
1993–1995	Rocko's Modern Life	Executive producer	TV series
1999	Rayman: The Animated Series	Executive producer	TV series
2024	Ren & Stimpy	Executive producer	TV series
