= Chris Reccardi =

American animator (1964–2019)

- Born: Christopher Joseph Reccardi; November 24, 1964; New York City, U.S.
- Died: May 2, 2019 (aged 54); Ventura, California, U.S.
- Occupations: Animator; artist; writer; producer; director; musician
- Years active: 1988–2019
- Known for: The Ren & Stimpy Show; The Powerpuff Girls; SpongeBob SquarePants; Samurai Jack; Tiny Toon Adventures; Super Robot Monkey Team Hyperforce Go!; Regular Show; Secret Mountain Fort Awesome; Chowder; The Marvelous Misadventures of Flapjack
- Spouse: Lynne Naylor (m. 1994)

Christopher Joseph Reccardi (November 24, 1964 – May 2, 2019) was an American animator, artist, writer, producer, director, and musician. He worked on numerous animated television series, including The Ren & Stimpy Show, Samurai Jack, The Powerpuff Girls, and Tiny Toon Adventures, and had directing duties on Super Robot Monkey Team Hyperforce Go! and SpongeBob SquarePants. He was also the supervising producer for the first season of Regular Show and creative director for the short-lived Secret Mountain Fort Awesome.

== Death ==
On May 2, 2019, Reccardi died at the age of 54 after suffering a heart attack while surfing in Ventura, California. The 2019 film Lady and the Tramp and the 2020 documentary Happy Happy Joy Joy: The Ren and Stimpy Story were dedicated in his memory.

== Filmography ==
=== Film ===
Year	Title	Notes
1989	Hound Town	Layout Artist & Storyboard Artist
1989	The Butter Battle Book	Layout Artist
1990	Computer Warriors: The Adventure Begins	Layout Artist
1992	Tiny Toon Adventures: How I Spent My Vacation	Character Layout Artist, Posing Artist, & Storyboard Artist
1994	The Flintstones	Songwriter
1996	Buy One, Get One Free	Additional Layout Artist & Animation Director
1998	Hercules and Xena – The Animated Movie: The Battle for Mount Olympus	Layout Artist, Effects Designer, Storyboard Artist, & Assistant Director
2004	Shark Tale	Additional Storyboard Artist
2005	Escape from Cluster Prime	Writer & Storyboard Artist
2007	Shrek the Third	Additional Storyboard Artist (uncredited)
2009	Monsters vs. Aliens	Additional Character Designer
2009	The Story of Walls	Background Artist
2009	The Haunted World of El Superbeasto	Storyboard Artist
2009	Cloudy with a Chance of Meatballs	Visual Development Artist
2010	Shrek Forever After	Storyboard Artist
2010	Megamind	Character Designer
2011	Open Season 3	Special thanks (as "Chris Riccardi")
2013	Cloudy with a Chance of Meatballs 2	Visual Development Artist
2014	The Lego Movie	Concept Artist & Designer
2014	Love & Mercy	Musician (Upright Bass)
2015	The SpongeBob Movie: Sponge Out of Water	Storyboard Artist
2016	Storks	Production Artist & Designer
2017	The Lego Batman Movie	Additional Concept Artist & Designer
2017	The Lego Ninjago Movie	Story Artist
2018	Hotel Transylvania 3: Summer Vacation	Title Animation Sequence Designer; Storyboard Artist (uncredited)
2019	The Lego Movie 2: The Second Part	Visual Development Artist
2019	Lady and the Tramp	Storyboard Artist (posthumous release)
2020	The SpongeBob Movie: Sponge on the Run	Storyboard Artist (posthumous release)
2020	Happy Happy Joy Joy: The Ren and Stimpy Story	Himself (posthumous release)

=== Television ===
Year	Title	Notes
1988	The New Adventures of Beany and Cecil	Layout Artist
1990–1991	Tiny Toon Adventures	Character Layout Artist, Storyboard Artist, & Model Designer
1990–1995	The Ren & Stimpy Show	Bass Guitarist ("Big House Blues"); Storyboard Artist; Layout Supervisor (1991–1993); Art Director ("Marooned"); Character Designer (1992–1993); Composer (1992; 1994); Songwriter (1992; 1995); Director (1992–1995); Story (1993–1994); Background Designer (1994)
1991; 1993	The Simpsons	Character Layout Artist ("Bart's Dog Gets an "F""); Additional Character Layout Artist (uncredited, Brother from the Same Planet)
1996	The Spooktacular New Adventures of Casper	Storyboard Artist
1998	Cow and Chicken	Storyboard Artist
1998	I Am Weasel	Storyboard Artist
1999	Dilbert	Storyboard Artist
1999–2000	The New Woody Woodpecker Show	Storyboard Artist
2000–2005	The Powerpuff Girls	Storyboard Artist (Seasons 2–6); Modeler (Seasons 3–4); Writer (Seasons 3–6); Story ("West in Pieces"); Character Supervisor (2004); Songwriter ("Nuthin' Special/Neighbor Hood")
2001	Samurai Jack	Writer & Storyboard Artist
2001	IMP Inc.	Co-Creator, Background Artist, Layout Artist, Writer, Director, Modeler, & Composer
2003	Dexter's Laboratory	Storyboard Artist & Writer ("Faux Chapeau," "Comic Stripper", and "Dexter's Wacky Races")
2003	Whatever Happened to... Robot Jones?	Writer & Storyboard Artist ("Summer Camp/Rules of Dating")
2004	The Grim Adventures of Billy & Mandy	Story & Storyboard Artist ("Substitute Teacher")
2004–2005	Foster's Home for Imaginary Friends	Background Supervisor ("Busted") (2004); Background Painter ("Bye Bye Nerdy") (2005); Color Stylist ("Bye Bye Nerdy") (2005)
2004–2006	Hi Hi Puffy AmiYumi	Layout Artist
2004–2006	Super Robot Monkey Team Hyperforce Go!	Assistant Director (2004–2006); Director (Seasons 3-4)
2007	My Life as a Teenage Robot	Writer & Storyboard Artist
2007	The Modifyers	Art Director, Executive Producer, Story, Additional Background Design, Character Design, Prop Design, Composer, & Co-creator; dropped pilot as of Shorts in a Bunch
2007–2008	SpongeBob SquarePants	Storyboard Director & Writer ("The Inmates of Summer," "20,000 Patties Under the Sea," and "A Life in a Day"); Songwriter ("The Inmates of Summer")
2009	Chowder	Story & Storyboard Artist ("The Party Cruise")
2009	The Marvelous Misadventures of Flapjack	Writer & Storyboard Artist ("Please Retire")
2009	Meddlen Meadows	Creator; failed pilot as part of The Cartoonstitute
2010	The Ricky Gervais Show	Storyboard Artist
2010	Regular Show	Supervising Producer (Season 1)
2011	The Mighty B!	Storyboard Artist ("Irritable Bowling Syndrome" and "BESS-E")
2011	Kick Buttowski: Suburban Daredevil	Storyboard Artist ("Luigi Vendetta")
2011–2012	Secret Mountain Fort Awesome	Creative Director, Writer, & Storyboard Artist
2012	Tron: Uprising	Storyboard Artist ("Beck's Beginning"-0.04)
2013	Mickey Mouse	Location Designer ("Croissant de Triomphe")
2013	Wander Over Yonder	Character Designer ("The Greatest/The Egg")
2013	Uncle Grandpa	Writer & Storyboard Artist ("Mystery Noise")
2017	Samurai Jack	Storyboard Layout ("Episode XCIX," "Episode C," and "Episode CI"); Character Designer ("Episode XCVI"); Prop Designer ("Episode XCII")
2017	Billy Dilley's Super-Duper Subterranean Summer	Writer & Storyboard Artist ("Jared")
2020	The Mighty Ones	Storyboard Artist ("Naked Mole Wrath") (posthumous release)

=== Video games ===
Year	Title	Notes
1993	The Ren & Stimpy Show: Veediots!	Music
