= List of I Am Weasel episodes =

List of episodes of American animated television series I Am Weasel

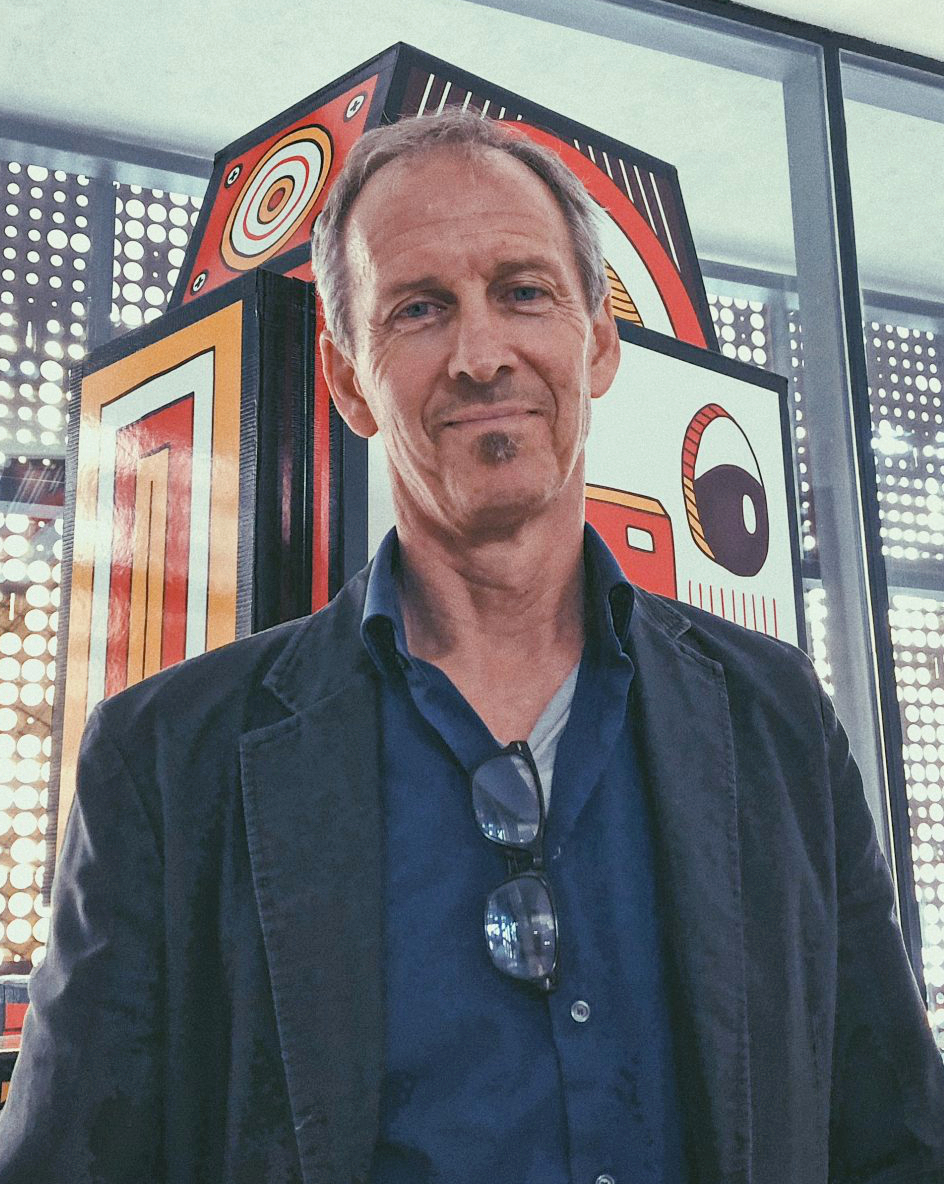
David Feiss created I Am Weasel for Cartoon Network as a spin-off of Cow and Chicken. The spin-off first appeared on Cow and Chicken episodes in 1997, and a full half-hour series ran from 1999 to 2000.

I Am Weasel is an American animated television series created for Cartoon Network by David Feiss, who directed all the episodes with the co-directions of Robin Steele (Note: Steele directed episodes from "This Bridge, Not Weasel Bridge" to "Happy Baboon Holidays".) and Robert Alvarez. (Note: Alvarez directed the episode "I. Architect".) The series follows the adventures of I.M. Weasel (voiced by Michael Dorn), a charismatic, genius, anthropomorphic weasel who is given great status in the world; and I.R. Baboon (voiced by Charlie Adler), a dimwitted, envious, and easily provoked baboon who constantly tries to outdo Weasel in his escapades.

The first four seasons were originally produced as segments featured on Feiss' other animated television series Cow and Chicken. Beginning in 1999, the segments were separated into a full series, which was joined by a fifth season. Overall, the series includes 79 episodes.

Official airdates for seasons 3 and 4, as well as the last airdate for season 5, are mostly unknown. Only production dates for the episodes are entirely known.

== Seasons ==
Season	Episodes	Originally released	
Season	Episodes	First released	Last released
1	13	July 22, 1997	December 16, 1997
2	13	January 13, 1998	April 7, 1998
3	13	August 1998	November 1998
4	13	January 1999	April 1999
5	27	June 10, 1999	2000

== Episodes ==
=== Season 1 (1997) ===
No. overall	No. in season	Title	Story by	Storyboard by	Original release date	Prod. code
1	1	"This Bridge, Not Weasel Bridge"	Unknown	David Feiss	September 16, 1997	34-5387
After a chief engineer is hit by a comet, Weasel is summoned by Admiral Bullets (voiced by Jess Harnell) to help finish the transatlantic bridge project from New York to Paris.
2	2	"I.R. on Sun"	Richard Pursel	David Feiss	July 22, 1997	34-5386
Ignorant to Weasel's warnings, I.R. attempts to become the first baboon on the sun.
3	3	"Deep Sea Tour"	Richard Pursel	Gordon Clark and Glen Kennedy	July 29, 1997	34-5388
Weasel sets forth to rescue three children and Captain I.R. Baboon from their sinking bathysphere.
4	4	"I.R. Gentlemans"	Richard Pursel	Robin Steele	August 5, 1997	34-5390
Weasel attempts to teach I.R. Baboon proper etiquette in preparation for a royal gathering in Yurp.
5	5	"I Are Big Star"	Richard Pursel	Gordon Clark and Glen Kennedy	August 12, 1997	34-5389
Weasel earns a major role for a film that I.R. was after.
6	6	"Power of Odor"	Richard Pursel	Gordon Clark	August 19, 1997	34-5391
I.R.'s organic pig farm causes an uproar in a city, leaving it up to Weasel to solve the problem.
7	7	"Ping Pong at Sea"	Richard Pursel	Charlie Bean	August 26, 1997	34-5392
I.R. manages to get himself into a live ping-pong game against Weasel, but he gets disqualified because he used an egg as a ball.
8	8	"Disease Fiesta"	Richard Pursel	Chris Hauge	September 2, 1997	34-5393
I.R. creates a disease which transforms people into amoebas, leaving it up to Weasel to clean this mess up.
9	9	"I.R. Plant Life"	Richard Pursel	Ken Mitchroney and Beth Mitchroney	September 9, 1997	34-5394
I.R. is running a failing plant stall and attempts to do a better job by selling a rare thistle from a nearby plant museum.
10	10	"I Am Ambassador"	Richard Pursel	Ken Mitchroney, Beth Mitchroney, and Gordon Clark	December 2, 1997	34-5395
Weasel attempts to save the lives of 5 French-Canadian beavers from being held at saw-point by two surfers.
11	11	"Law of Gravity"	Richard Pursel	Chris Hauge	December 9, 1997	34-5397
I.R. constantly makes changes to the Law of Gravity, much to the annoyance and disapproval of Weasel.
12	12	"Happy Baboon Holidays"	Richard Pursel	Gordon Clark	September 23, 1997	34-5396
I.R.'s Christmas celebrations go wrong when his family (mother, father and elder sister) are thawed out at Weasel's pent-house.
13	13	"I. Architect"	Unknown	Richard Pursel	December 16, 1997	34-5398
Both Weasel and I.R. end up in hospital after a collision course. However, a slight mix-up in the operation room leads to both having the other's brain.

=== Season 2 (1998) ===
No. overall	No. in season	Title	Animation directed by	Written by	Storyboard by	Original release date	Prod. code
14	1	"I.R. Mommy"	Robert Alvarez	Story by: Richard Pursel	David Feiss	January 13, 1998	34-5678
I.R. adopts a baby, but is soon given lessons in motherhood by Weasel. This episode had to be revised in 1999 to remove the letter "N" from I.R.'s helmet after a lawsuit from the University of Nebraska–Lincoln.
15	2	"I Am Deity"	Bill Reed	Steve Marmel	Butch Hartman	January 20, 1998	34-5680
Weasel and I.R. concoct life, but the red-butt baboon soon becomes jealous when Weasel's world evolves faster than his.
16	3	"I Am Crybaby"	Robert Alvarez	Story by: Richard Pursel	Vincent Waller	January 27, 1998	34-5681
Weasel tries to help provide a good source for people with a severe crying syndrome.
17	4	"I.R.'s Phantom Foot"	Dave Brain	Story by: Richard Pursel	David Feiss	February 3, 1998	34-5677
After tripping over an invisible pot-hole, I.R. breaks his "phantom foot". Ultimately, he attempts to sue Weasel over his injury.
18	5	"Queen of DeNile"	Dave Brain	Story by: Steve Marmel	Bob Camp	February 10, 1998	34-5679
It's the Egyptian times, and Weasel and I.R. are both asp exterminators, attempting to save the queen Cleopantless (The Red Guy) from this infestation.
19	6	"I Are Music Man"	Bob Jaques	Story by: Richard Pursel and Michael Ryan	Nora Johnson	February 17, 1998	34-5682
In an attempt to prove his claim that he's a better musician than Weasel, I.R. gatecrashes a live event, armed with a theremin.
20	7	"I Am My Lifetime"	Bill Reed	Story by: Richard Pursel	Chris Reccardi	February 24, 1998	34-5685
Weasel and I.R. (now both senior citizens) look back upon their memories.
21	8	"I.R. Pixie Fairie"	Brian Hogan	Story by: Richard Pursel	Bob Camp	March 3, 1998	34-5686
Uncle Breezybum (The Red Guy) tells a story about Weasel, I.R. and pixie fairie versions of the same characters.
22	9	"I.R. Ice Fisher"	Robert Alvarez	Story by: Richard Pursel	Charlie Bean	March 10, 1998	34-5684
Weasel and his guest spend some quality time together in Saskatchewan, Canada. Later, Weasel teaches I.R. about ice fishing.
23	10	"I.R. Role Model"	Robert Alvarez	Story by: Steve Marmel; Teleplay by: Michael Ryan	Celia Kendrick and David Feiss	March 17, 1998	34-5688
Weasel saves a woman (The Red Guy) from a fire, but everyone thinks I.R. did it and the Red Guy frames Weasel of starting the fire.
24	11	"I.R. in Wrong Cartoon"	Dave Brain	Steve Marmel	Chris Savino	March 24, 1998	34-5687
With help from the Red Guy, Cow manages to fish Weasel out of her TV and into her home, leaving it up to I.R. to find him.
25	12	"My Friend, the Smart Banana"	Robert Alvarez	Story by: Michael Ryan	Bob Camp	March 31, 1998	34-5689
Weasel befriends an intellectual banana.
26	13	"I.R. Wild Baboon"	Bill Reed	Steve Marmel	Celia Kendrick	April 7, 1998	34-5683
Whilst in prison, Weasel explains his crime when he stalked I.R. Baboon as a subject for a wildlife study, which turns out to all be a bad weasel dream that Cow had.

=== Season 3 (1998) ===
No. overall	No. in season	Title	Animation directed by	Story by	Storyboard by	Original release date	Prod. code
27	1	"Time Weasel"	Brian Hogan	David Feiss, Steve Marmel and Michael Ryan	Maxwell Atoms	August 1998	34-5753
Weasel and I.R. travel in time, changing it in the process (expect dinosaurs and the inventions of glasses and onion rings).
28	2	"The Hole"	Bill Reed	David Feiss and Steve Marmel	Maxwell Atoms	August 1998	34-5755
Weasel studies one of the natural wonders of the world, a gigantic hole. Unfortunately, I.R. has come over as well, along with his obsession to fill up every single hole in the world.
29	3	"I Stand Corrected"	Brian Hogan	David Feiss and Michael Ryan	Maxwell Atoms	August 1998	34-5756
Serving a 99-year sentence at a correctional facility with I.R. Baboon, Weasel starts to feel concerned about the inhumane correctional devices that are set up on fellow prisoners.
30	4	"I Am Bush Pilot"	David Brain	David Feiss and Michael Ryan	Bob Camp	August 1998	34-5757
Weasel is an aircraft pilot, with I.R. as his co-pilot. Their job is to bring passengers upstream because of a dam, created by beavers, getting in the way. However, things go wrong when there's too much weight aboard.
31	5	"Dessert Island"	Robert Alvarez and Ron Myrick	Maxwell Atoms	Maxwell Atoms	August 1998	34-5706
Weasel and I.R. end up stranded on an island made entirely of confectioneries (i.e., chocolate, ice cream, cupcakes, etc.).
32	6	"Unsinkable I.R."	Brian Hogan	David Feiss and Michael Ryan	Chris Savino	October 1998	34-5758
I.R. is the captain of his own ship, but Admiral Weasel is concerned over his rules and the condition of the actual ship.
33	7	"I Am Vampire"	Bill Reed	Maxwell Atoms	Maxwell Atoms	September 1998	34-5761
Weasel and I.R. are vampires looking for some fun. What's more, they get on well with the villagers. Later on the Red Guy (who's a vampire hunter) tries to put steaks through their hearts.
34	8	"Honey I Are Home"	Ron Myrick	Maxwell Atoms	Maxwell Atoms	September 1998	34-5763
I.R. Baboon is jealous over his neighbor, Weasel, because he has a better life, job, and family (married to a beautiful Hispanic woman with half-weasel children) than him. However, when he's invited over to Weasel's house for a barbecue, I.R. tries to impress him with his own "family" (his pretend marriage to a pantsless woman, the Red Guy, with junk as his children).
35	9	"Driver's Sped"	David Brain	David Feiss and Michael Ryan	Marc Perry	October 1998	34-5759
A poetic I.R. attempts to get a driving license, with Weasel being his instructor.
36	10	"A Tree Story"	Robert Alvarez	David Feiss and Michael Ryan	Steve Fonti	October 1998	34-5764
Weasel tries to settle a dispute between a group of trees and those that hurt them (notably I.R. Baboon).
37	11	"I.R. Do"	Ron Myrick	David Feiss, Nora Johnson and Michael Ryan	Nora Johnson	November 1998	34-5765
Weasel attends I.R.'s wedding, only to find that the bride hasn't shown up yet.
38	12	"I Are Good Dog!"	Rumen Petkov	Maxwell Atoms	Maxwell Atoms	November 1998	34-5766
Weasel and I.R. are adopted as dogs by a young boy.
39	13	"He Said, He Said."	Michael Longden	Steve Marmel and Michael Ryan	Lynne Naylor	November 1998	34-5767
Weasel and I.R. simultaneously tell their psychiatrist (The Red Guy) about each other's mishaps.

=== Season 4 (1999) ===
No. overall	No. in season	Title	Animation directed by	Story by	Storyboard by	Original release date	Prod. code
40	1	"Enemy Camp"	Dave Brain	David Feiss and Steve Marmel	David Feiss	January 1999	34-5754
Best friends turned enemies, Weasel and I.R. look back to when they attended a camp where they were trained to become arch enemies.
41	2	"I Am Clichéd"	Rumen Petkov	Steve Marmel and Michael Ryan	Paul McEvoy	January 1999	34-5770
Weasel and I.R. star in Louie B. Bare's (the Red Guy as a parody of Louis B. Mayer) "original" cartoon that actually contains classic cartoon clichés.
42	3	"I Are Gladiator"	Michael Longden	Maxwell Atoms	Maxwell Atoms	January 1999	34-5771
Weasel and I.R. battle each other as gladiators in the Roman times.
43	4	"Revolutionary Weasel"	Rumen Petkov	David Feiss and Michael Ryan	Steve Fonti	January 1999	34-5768
Weasel and I.R. (as senior citizens) tell their grandchildren about their ancestors' involvement in the War of Independence.
44	5	"I Are Ghost"	Dave Brain	David Feiss and Michael Ryan	Lynne Naylor	February 1999	34-5769
Weasel and I.R. (as ghosts) are called to haunt a famed Hollywood starlette (The Red Guy) out of her home. And as always, things don't go to plan.
45	6	"The Magnificent Motorbikini"	Robert Alvarez and Rumen Petkov	Maxwell Atoms	Maxwell Atoms	February 1999	34-5772
Weasel and I.R. test out a new form of transport that's half motorcycle, half bikini, with dramatic (and disastrous) results.
46	7	"I Am Hairstylist"	Dave Brain	David Feiss and Michael Ryan	Lynne Naylor	February 1999	34-5773
Weasel and I.R. run one of the best hair salons around. However, the hair police (The Red Guy) soon has a look into this in an attempt to shut them down.
47	8	"I Am Whale Captain"	Robert Alvarez	Maxwell Atoms	Maxwell Atoms	February 1999	34-5776
Traveling by Whale, Weasel and I.R. set sail to find a giant octopus.
48	9	"Dream Weasel"	Robert Alvarez and Bill Reed	David Feiss and Michael Ryan	Carey Yost	March 1999	34-5774
Weasel creates a device that controls peoples' sleeping patterns, and decides to use it in order to help give the public their ability to dream again.
49	10	"The Sackless Games"	Ron Myrick	David Feiss, Steve Marmel and Michael Ryan	David Feiss	March 1999	34-5762
Lance Sackless (The Red Guy) creates his own athletic games, with Weasel and I.R. as his only contestants.
50	11	"The Baboon's Paw"	Rumen Petkov	Maxwell Atoms	Maxwell Atoms	March 1999	34-5772
After seeing a Monkey's Paw sold in Chinatown, I.R. starts making wishes using the fingers of his hands.
51	12	"Who Rubbed Out Cow and Chicken?"	Robert Alvarez	David Feiss and Michael Ryan	Bob Camp	April 1999	34-5778
Weasel and I.R. investigate to see who has done the heinous crime of erasing Cow and Chicken out of existence. Eventually they discover that the culprit is the Red Guy trying to take over the show, and this was all a dream Cow had.
52	13	"I Are Good Salesmans"	Ron Myrick	David Feiss and Michael Ryan	David Feiss	April 1999	34-5775
Weasel attempts to stop I.R. and The Red Guy from selling wild fire and fire extinguishers respectively door-to-door.

=== Season 5 (1999–2000) ===
No. overall	No. in season	Title	Animation directed by	Story by	Storyboard by	Original release date	Prod. code
53	1	"I Are Terraformer!"	Brian Hogan	Maxwell Atoms	Maxwell Atoms	June 10, 1999	34-5951
Weasel and I.R. travel to the Moon to create a new form of living, through oxygen, cities and plants.
54	2	"I Am Viking"	Robert Alvarez and Ron Myrick	David Feiss and Michael Ryan	David Feiss	June 10, 1999	34-5956
Weasel and I.R. are vikings, who are ready, willing and able to pillage and plunder anything in sight. However, is it not too late to join The Red Guy in being a viking cheerleader?
55	3	"The Drinking Fountain of Youth"	Robert Alvarez and Bill Reed	David Feiss and Michael Ryan	David Feiss	June 10, 1999	34-595?
In a Juan Ponce de León-like story, Weasel and I.R. set sail to find the Drinking Fountain of Youth.
56	4	"Leave It to Weasel"	Dave Brain	Maxwell Atoms	Maxwell Atoms	June 18, 1999	34-5954
Weasel and I.R. are called in as replacement kids after a couple's real children go away to camp.
57	5	"The Fairy Godfather"	Rumen Petkov	David Feiss and Michael Ryan	David Feiss	June 18, 1999	34-5955
Based on Cinderella, Cinder-Weasel tries to make it to the evening ball, despite the interference of his evil stepbrother, I.R. Baboon. He relies on the help from his fairy godfather (the Red Guy).
58	6	"I Are Robin Hood"	Bill Reed	David Feiss and Michael Ryan	Nora Johnson	June 18, 1999	34-5958
I.R. Baboon takes the role of Robin Hood, with Weasel being his ally, Little John.
59	7	"The Incredible Shrinking Weasel!"	Brian Hogan	David Feiss and Michael Ryan	Maxwell Atoms	June 25, 1999	34-5957
Doctors Weasel and I.R. shrink themselves in order to perform an operation, which is to repair a crack in The Red Guy's butt cheek.
60	8	"Baboon Man and Boy Weasel"	Brian Hogan	David Feiss and Michael Ryan	David Feiss	June 25, 1999	34-5961
Based on Batman, I.R. Baboon is the hero known as Baboon Man, whereas Weasel is his sidekick, Weasel Boy.
61	9	"I.M.N. Love"	Robert Alvarez	David Feiss and Michael Ryan	Nora Johnson	June 25, 1999	34-5952
Whilst at the gym, Weasel and I.R. fall in love with Cow and Chicken's teacher.
62	10	"I.R.'s First Bike"	Robert Alvarez	David Feiss and Michael Ryan	David Feiss	August 20, 1999	34-????
I.R. gets a bike for Christmas. Learning of his inexperience, Weasel tries to help him.
63	11	"The Sorcerer's a Dentist"	Rumen Petkov	Maxwell Atoms	Maxwell Atoms	August 20, 1999	34-????
Back in the medieval times, Weasel is a dentist with wizardry powers with Baboon as his envious nurse.
64	12	"The Wrong Bros."	Ron Myrick	David Feiss and Michael Ryan	David Feiss	August 20, 1999	34-????
Based on the true story of The Wright Brothers, The Red Guy narrates a documentary about The Wright Bros. and the Rong Bros. (Weasel and I.R.), competing to see who could invent the first plane.
65	13	"I Am Cave Weasel"	Robert Alvarez	David Feiss and Michael Ryan	Steve Fonti	August 21, 1999	34-5968
Weasel and Baboon are cavemen living back in the prehistoric times, while Weasel tries to invent new products to create the future.
66	14	"My Blue Hiney"	David Feiss and Dave Brain	David Feiss and Michael Ryan	David Feiss	August 21, 1999	34-5980
A narrator tells the story about the travelling country-singing duo of Weasel and Baboon.
67	15	"Mission: Stupid"	Bill Reed	Maxwell Atoms	Maxwell Atoms	August 21, 1999	34-5971
Weasel and Baboon are troops enlisted in the U.S Ground Force and must rescue a lone kitty stuck in a tree.
68	16	"Back to School"	Brian Hogan	David Feiss and Michael Ryan	Nora Johnson	November 26, 1999	34-5970
Weasel and I.R. are sent back to repeat the 4th Grade, in which they would go to the same school as Cow and Chicken.
69	17	"I Are a Artiste"	David Feiss and Ron Myrick	David Feiss and Michael Ryan	David Feiss	November 26, 1999	34-5964
The Red Guy narrates the story of when Weasel and Baboon moved to Paris in 1909 where they compete with Pierre-Auguste Renoir and Vincent van Gogh to see who draw the best crayon drawing.
70	18	"Fred: Last of the Idiots"	Dave Brain and Rumen Petkov	David Feiss and Michael Ryan	David Feiss	November 26, 1999	34-5965
Weasel and Baboon are on an expedition to capture a wild, dim-witted savage named Fred. When they manage to capture him, Weasel, however, cannot understand his unusual language.
71	19	"I Are Bellhop"	Bill Reed	Maxwell Atoms	Maxwell Atoms	November 19, 1999	34-5967
Weasel works at a hotel as the manager, whereas I.R. is his incompetent bellhop. However, Weasel needs to rely on I.R.'s help when an acclaimed cannibal actor (The Red Guy) wants to eat him for dinner.
72	20	"Take I.R. Out to the Ballgame"	Robert Alvarez	David Feiss and Michael Ryan	David Feiss	November 19, 1999	34-????
Weasel attempts to take I.R. out to a baseball game.
73	21	"I Bee Weasel"	David Feiss and Ron Myrick	David Feiss and Michael Ryan	David Feiss	November 19, 1999	34-5966
Weasel and I.R. are worker bees, and our red-butt baboon wants to do a honey dance like all the other bees, but it soon results in further problems.
74	22	"I Am Franken-Weasel"	Dave Brain	David Feiss and Michael Ryan	Steve Fonti	November 12, 1999	34-5972
Based on the story of Frankenstein, Weasel is a mad scientist, whereas I.R. is his assistant.
75	23	"A Troo Storee"	Rumen Petkov	Maxwell Atoms	Maxwell Atoms	November 12, 1999	34-5974
Weasel's attempts to prove the theory on monkeys typing Shakespeare goes wrong when almost every monkey involved walks out on him. However, he sees hope in the form of I.R. Baboon, who writes a book entitled "A Troo Storee", despite the fact that it lowers peoples' I.Q. level.
76	24	"Rodeo Weasel"	Brian Hogan	David Feiss and Michael Ryan	Nora Johnson	November 12, 1999	34-5973
Weasel is famous cowboy working in a rodeo in which Baboon is a clown. Cow and Chicken's teacher and her husband appear in this episode.
77	25	"The Legend of Big Butt"	Robert Alvarez	David Feiss and Michael Ryan	David Feiss	2000	34-5975
Weasel and I.R. are in search of a legend known as Big Butt, which later happens to be The Red Guy.
78	26	"I Am Dragon Slayer"	Dave Brain	David Feiss and Michael Ryan	David Feiss	2000	34-5976
It's the Middle Ages, and Weasel and I.R. are looking for a dragon to slay.
79	27	"I Are Legend"	Bill Reed	David Feiss, Maxwell Atoms and Michael Ryan	David Feiss	2000	34-5977
In the series finale (based on the novel I Am Legend), Weasel, I.R. and the Red Guy are believed to be the last beings on Earth, until they discover that everybody has been watching their show... where it turns out that Baboon is really the star!

== See also ==
- List of Cow and Chicken episodes
