= List of Cow and Chicken episodes =

Poster to the Cow and Chicken pilot.

Cow and Chicken is an American animated comedy television series created by David Feiss. It follows the surreal adventures of two cartoon animal siblings, Cow and Chicken. They are often antagonized by the Red Guy, a cartoon version of the Devil who poses as various characters to scam them.

The pilot episode originally aired as part of the Cartoon Network series What a Cartoon on November 12, 1995. The series later made its official debut on July 15, 1997, and ended on August 13, 1999, with a total of 52 episodes (104 segments) over the course of 4 seasons. Cow and Chicken was attached to another segment called I Am Weasel, which was later spun off into its own half-hour series on June 10, 1999.

The series creator David Feiss directed all the episodes, with the co-directions of Monte Young, (Note: in "The Ugliest Weenie") John McIntyre, (Note: in "Alive!") and Robert Alvarez. (Note: in "Field Trip to Folsom Prison", "The Girl's Bathroom", "Supermodel Cow", "Part Time Job", "Who Is Supercow?", "Confused", "Happy Meat", "Orthodontic Police", "The Cow with Four Eyes!", "Cow's Instincts... Don't It?", "Ballerina Cow", "Lawnmower Chicken", "Space Cow", "Headhunting in Oregon", and "The King and Queen of Cheese")

== Series overview ==
Season	Episodes	Originally released	
Season	Episodes	First released	Last released
Pilot		November 12, 1995	
1	13	July 15, 1997	October 7, 1997
2	13	January 13, 1998	April 7, 1998
3	13	September 1, 1998	May 3, 1999
4	13	April 26, 1999	August 13, 1999

== Episodes ==
=== Pilot (1995) ===
Title	Directed by	Story by	Original release date
"No Smoking"	David Feiss	Pilar Feiss, Sam Kieth, & David Feiss	November 12, 1995
Cow and Chicken are sister and brother. After Chicken is caught smoking by the Red Guy, he is taken to the underworld where Super Cow must save him.

=== Season 1 (1997) ===
This season was produced from November 1996 to June 1997.

No. overall	No. in season	Title	Story by	Storyboard by	Original release date	Prod. code
1a	1a	"Field Trip to Folsom Prison"	Unknown	David Feiss	July 15, 1997	34-5378
While on a field trip to a local prison (where the Red Guy is the Warden), Chicken ends up switching places with one of the convicts.
1b	1b	"The Girl's Bathroom"	David Feiss	Greg Emison	July 15, 1997	34-5361
Chicken reluctantly accepts a dare set by Flem and Earl to see what the girls' bathroom at school is like.
2a	2a	"Supermodel Cow"	David Feiss & Bill Burnett	Greg Emison	July 22, 1997	34-5366
Cow has her big break when the Red Guy hires her as a supermodel. She soon learns that fame does not last long.
2b	2b	"Part Time Job"	David Feiss & Bill Burnett	Barrington Bunce	July 22, 1997	34-5362
Cow gets a part time job at a milk farm in order for her to get a Crabs the Warthog doll. When Chicken tries to apply for a part time job, he soon ends up in danger.
3a	3a	"Alive!"	David Feiss & Bill Burnett	John McIntyre	July 29, 1997	34-5364
A game of "Catch" results in Cow and her cousin, Boneless Chicken getting stuck on the roof of their house.
3b	3b	"Who Is Super Cow?"	Monte Young, Victor Ortado & Larry Huber	John Holmquist	July 29, 1997	34-5384
The Red Guy tries to find out Supercow's real identity.
4a	4a	"Confused"	David Feiss, Seth MacFarlane & Bill Burnett	John Holmquist	August 5, 1997	34-5369
After making a small mess, Cow and Chicken are sent to a military school, then to sensitivity training (both run by the Red Guy).
4b	4b	"The Molting Fairy"	Victor Ortado & Bill Burnett	Monte Young	August 5, 1997	34-5375
Chicken wakes up one morning to find that he is molting. He soon uses this to his advantage when he learns that he can get paid for all the feathers he loses.
5a	5a	"The Ugliest Weenie Part One"	Bill Burnett	Monte Young	August 12, 1997	34-5365
Cow writes a play entitled "The Ugliest Weenie", which Chicken finds to be stupid, but the drama teacher, Mr. Fleur, finds it compelling and turns it into a play. Chicken's role in the play leads to love with a French student, and a feud with best friend, Flem.
5b	5b	"The Ugliest Weenie Epilogue"	Bill Burnett	Monte Young	August 12, 1997	34-5368
"The Ugliest Weenie" is acted out in full, this time with the leading roles filled in by Cow and Chicken. By the end of the act, the stage catches on fire from a freak accident.
6a	6a	"Crash Dive!"	Vincent Davis	Monte Young	August 19, 1997	34-5371
Chicken floats down stream in his new home-made submarine. Knowing of a nearby waterfall, Cow attempts to save him.
6b	6b	"Happy Meat"	Victor Ortado & Bill Burnett	Barrington Bunce	August 19, 1997	34-5374
Sick and tired of the ketchup-based meals being served at school by Mrs. Barederriere (the Red Guy), Cow and Chicken follow in their grandparents' footsteps and make a food stall that serves meat.
7a	7a	"School Bully"	David Feiss, Greg Emison & Bill Burnett	John Holmquist	August 26, 1997	34-5381
Chicken and Flem help their regular bully, Butch, after he is outshined by a meaner, stronger bully.
7b	7b	"Time Machine"	David Feiss	Nora Johnson	August 26, 1997	34-5372
Cow and Chicken find a time machine, and decide to travel in time. Things go wrong when the Red Guy shows up in an attempt to change the course of history for the worse.
8a	8a	"Orthodontic Police"	David Feiss, Bill Burnett & Victor Ortado	Nora Johnson	September 2, 1997	34-5378
Cow and Chicken are given inhumane braces by an "orthodontic police officer" (the Red Guy), and then soon learn that they are not the only ones.
8b	8b	"The Cow with Four Eyes!"	David Feiss & Bill Burnett	Greg Emison	September 2, 1997	34-5377
Cow has become the most popular student in school thanks to her new glasses. Jealous of this, Chicken decides to get some as well, leading up to an attempt to destroy a new school dungeon (which was actually a new swimming pool).
9a	9a	"Cow's Instincts... Don't It?"	Bill Burnett & Seth MacFarlane	Barrington Bunce	September 9, 1997	34-5367
Cow believes that she has some form of herding instinct, which leads her to following a postman, ducks, fish and even soldiers.
9b	9b	"Ballerina Cow"	Bill Burnett	Monte Young	September 9, 1997	34-5380
Cow has started taking up ballet, but due to her weight, she brings the house down (literally) fortunately, she finds someone to help her find fame, in the form of homewrecker Mr. Slacksoff (the Red Guy).
10a	10a	"Chicken's First Kiss"	Richard Pursel & Bill Burnett	Monte Young	September 16, 1997	34-5385
After the girls beat the boys in a game of "Girls Chase Boys", Chicken is tormented by the claim that he is in love with a girl named Winey. This leads to Chicken having an anxiety attack over suffering from her "cooties".
10b	10b	"Squirt the Daisies"	Unknown	Greg Emison	September 16, 1997	34-5376
While getting money to play on the arcade machines, Chicken is brought in by the Red Guy to play on a virtual reality machine. Games include "Kick the Can", "Duck, Duck, Goose" and Cow's favorite game, "Squirt the Daisies". He learns that just because these look like preschool games does not mean that they do not have an extreme twist.
11a	11a	"Lawnmower Chicken"	Richard Pursel	John Holmquist	September 23, 1997	34-5370
Chicken tries to earn extra money by mowing the lawn of Mr. Devlin (the Red Guy).
11b	11b	"Cow Loves Piles"	Victor Ortado, Bill Burnett & Greg Emison	Barrington Bunce	September 23, 1997	34-5379
Cow is with her family at the fair, where she takes her new doll, Piles the Beaver with her. When she loses Piles, Cow must chase after and recover him.
12a	12a	"Space Cow"	David Feiss, Seth MacFarlane & Bill Burnett	John Holmquist	September 30, 1997	34-5373
As part of a school assignment, Cow and Chicken write essays on what jobs they want when they are older. Since Cow's essay won, she gets to live her dream as an astronaut, whereas the runner-up, Chicken, works at a supermarket.
12b	12b	"The Legend of Sailcat"	David Feiss & Bill Burnett	Nora Johnson	September 30, 1997	34-5382
Chicken, Flem and Earl are camping with Flem's father. After Cow shows up, Flem's dad sings a story about a legend named Sailcat.
13a	13a	"Headhunting in Oregon"	David Feiss, Victor Ortado & Bill Burnett	Greg Emison	October 7, 1997	34-5383
The family heads over to Oregon to find a tribe of head-hunters. Eventually, Chicken soon becomes the "hunted", especially when the Red Guy is their leader.
13b	13b	"The King and Queen of Cheese"	David Feiss, Gordon Coulthart & Bill Burnett	Nora Johnson	October 7, 1997	34-5399
Cow heads over to Cornflake, Arkansas, where she tries to help Larry Lackapants (the Red Guy) become the king and queen of cheese.

=== Season 2 (1998) ===
13 half-hours of this season were produced from December 1997 to March 1998. 13 more half-hours were produced from July to November 1998, splitting off into a third season.

No. overall	No. in season	Title	Animation direction by	Written by	Storyboard by	Original release date	Prod. code
14a	1a	"Fluffy the Anaconda"	Robert Alvarez	Story by: Bill Burnett	Nora Johnson	January 13, 1998	34-5651
Cow adopts an anaconda, who proceeds to swallow the entire family.
14b	1b	"The Laughing Puddle"	Michael Longden	Bill Burnett	Don Shank	January 13, 1998	34-5656
Chicken discovers a mysterious puddle that brings people in through laughter.
15a	2a	"Pirate Lessons (Capt. Butz Pirate)" "Captain Buzz Pirate"	Ron Myrick	Bill Burnett	Dave Brain	January 20, 1998	34-5658
Capt. Butz Pirate (the Red Guy) takes Cow and Chicken aboard to become pirates.
15b	2b	"Halloween with Dead Ghost, Coast to Coast"	Robert Alvarez	Story by: Richard Pursel	Don Shank	January 20, 1998	34-5654
Following advice from Dead Ghost (the Red Guy spoofing Space Ghost) Cow and Chicken go trick-or-treating dressed as adults resembling their parents however the trick-or-treating does not go as planned as the town mistakes cow and chicken as grownups.
16a	3a	"Tongue Sandwich"	Dave Brain	Story by: Michael Ryan	Charlie Bean	January 27, 1998	34-5653
A talkative Cow ends up with her tongue escaping after a sneeze. The tongue causes all sorts of mayhem which ends up with the law on his tail.
16b	3b	"Dream Date Chicken"	Brian Hogan	Story by: Richard Pursel	Chris Reccardi	January 27, 1998	34-5652
Fed up with chores and his parents' rules, Chicken runs away from home to live the "bachelor lifestyle" of his cousin, Boneless Chicken. He falls in love with a beautiful girl and goes on a date with her. But at the end of the date, Chicken is arrested by the Red Guy for running away (so does his date for letting it happen) because Boneless called the police and knew he ran away.
17a	4a	"Sumo Cow"	Dave Brain and Robert Alvarez	Steve Marmel	Charlie Bean	February 3, 1998	34-5657
Cow represents the school for sumo wrestling, and Chicken finds some advantage to this.
17b	4b	"Comet!"	Brian Hogan	Steve Marmel	Kurt Anderson	February 3, 1998	34-5666
Chicken plays a comet prank during a field trip to an observatory, but the entire city thinks that the comet is real.
18a	5a	"Dirty Laundry"	Frank Weiss and Dave Brain	Steve Marmel	Butch Hartman	February 10, 1998	34-5660
The school revamps their newspaper into a television news show with the help of Geraldo Rearviewa (the Red Guy) who uses Chicken to generate scandalous stories.
18b	5b	"Grizzly Beaver Safari"	Bill Reed	Story by: Richard Pursel	Chris Reccardi	February 10, 1998	34-5655
Cow and Chicken are in Africa where they encounter wild animals such as the Grizzly Beaver.
19a	6a	"Boneless Kite"	Brian Hogan	Bill Burnett	David Feiss	February 17, 1998	34-5659
Cow, Chicken and their cousin Boneless Chicken travel to the Lava Park, where they learn how to fly a kite. Unfortunately, when Baron Von Non-Leiderhosen (the Red Guy) loses his kite, he uses Boneless as one for a tug o' war contest.
19b	6b	"Which Came First?"	Bob Jaques	Michael Ryan	Nora Johnson	February 17, 1998	34-5662
Chicken wakes up one morning and finds an egg underneath him (placed there by the Red Guy), leading him to dress up as a girl, as well as going out on a date with Flem and Earl.
20a	7a	"Buffalo Gals"	Ron Myrick	Story by : Bill Burnett; Teleplay by : Michael Ryan	Vincent Waller	February 24, 1998	34-5661
Cow and Chicken's house is invaded by a gang of lady bikers who like to chew on carpet and invite Cow into a game of softball.: Note: This episode was pulled due to objectionable content. Further runs of the latter segment would have it paired with the season 1 episode, "Orthodontic Police."
20b	7b	"Cow and Chicken Reclining"	Robert Alvarez	Bill Burnett	Charlie Bean	February 24, 1998	34-5664
While trying out Dad's lethal chair, both Cow and Chicken end up trapped inside.
21a	8a	"Free Inside!"	Dave Brain	Story by: Steve Marmel	Chris Reccardi	March 3, 1998	34-5665
Chicken receives a credit card (which only has 25 cents worth of credit) inside his cereal. He and Cow are both stalked by the Red Guy over the fee they have to pay after purchasing some gum.
21b	8b	"Journey to the Center of Cow"	Brian Hogan	Michael Ryan	Don Shank	March 3, 1998	34-5663
While trying out the Pork Butt catapult, Chicken is accidentally swallowed by Cow. Mom and Dad take her to a doctor (the Red Guy) and they must get Chicken back out before he journeys through all four of Cow's stomachs.
22a	9a	"The Karate Chick"	Dave Brain	Steve Marmel	Adam Burton	March 10, 1998	34-5668
Chicken takes up karate lessons in order to get back at a school bully.
22b	9b	"Yard Sale"	Dave Brain and Brian Hogan	Michael Ryan	Don Shank	March 10, 1998	34-5667
A simple yard sale leads to Cow and Chicken attempting to win back their lawn, which the Red Guy purchased.
23a	10a	"Meet Lance Sackless"	Joey Banaszkiewicz	Steve Marmel	Butch Hartman	March 17, 1998	34-5669
Cow and Chicken attempt to get their home video sent to a big TV show in Canada, hosted by Lance Sackless (the Red Guy).
23b	10b	"Who's Afraid of the Dark?"	Robert Alvarez	Story by: Michael Ryan	Nora Johnson	March 17, 1998	34-5670
Mom and Dad are worried about their children when they say they are not scared of the dark. So, they hire a scared Dr. Laxslax (the Red Guy) to solve the problem.
24a	11a	"The Bad News Plastic Surgeons"	Bill Reed	Michael Ryan	David Feiss	March 24, 1998	34-5671
Cow and Chicken represent the school for Plastic Surgery, with Dr. Hiney (the Red Guy) under their wing.
24b	11b	"The Exchange Stüdent"	Ron Myrick	Michael Ryan	Charlie Bean	March 24, 1998	34-5672
A student from a nearby town, Slappy McCracken, visits the school and develops a friendship with Cow.
25a	12a	"Child Star"	Dave Brain	Story by: Steve Marmel	Nora Johnson	March 31, 1998	34-5675
Cow takes the starring role in Ivan Panced's (the Red Guy's) new movie, "Pretty Little Girl".
25b	12b	"Perpetual Energy"	Bill Reed	Steve Marmel	Don Dougherty	March 31, 1998	34-5673
Cow and Chicken unwittingly create perpetual energy through spilling a junior chemistry set. This leads Rear Admiral Floyd (the Red Guy) to a get-rich scheme.
26a	13a	"Bad Chicken"	Brian Hogan	Steve Marmel	Butch Hartman	April 7, 1998	34-5674
After Cow and Chicken tamper with the school photocopier, The Copy Fairy (the Red Guy) makes an evil version of Chicken through one of his copies. Evil Chicken soon runs rampant and it becomes up to Cow and Chicken to stop him and clear Chicken's name.
26b	13b	"Stay Awake"	Bill Reed	Story by: Michael Ryan	Chris Reccardi	April 7, 1998	34-5676
Chicken ends up being hyperactive and having insomnia after consuming some caffeinated cereal.

=== Season 3 (1998–99) ===
No. overall	No. in season	Title	Animation direction by	Story by	Storyboard by	Original release date	Prod. code
27a	1a	"Can Cow Come Out and Play?"	Dave Brain	David Feiss and Steve Marmel	Charlie Bean	September 1, 1998	34-5701
The Red Guy notices Cow has Crabs the Warthog, whereas he has the matching dollhouse. He tries to ask Mom if he can play with Cow, but she says she would not allow it "unless he was the last man on Earth". He attempts to lure the entire world's population (excluding Cow) into a free trailer.
27b	1b	"Horn Envy"	Bill Reed	Written by: David Feiss and Michael Ryan	Nora Johnson	September 1, 1998	34-5702
Cow is in love with a male student at school. She tries opening his heart to her by making bigger and better horns than the tiny ones she has got.
28a	2a	"Goin' My Way?"	Ron Myrick	Written by: David Feiss and Michael Ryan	David Feiss	September 8, 1998	34-5703
Mom and Dad pick up and then adopt a hitchhiker in the form of the Red Guy, much to the disappointment of Cow and Chicken.
28b	2b	"The Babysitter"	Robert Alvarez	Steve Marmel	Nora Johnson	September 8, 1998	34-5707
Mom and Dad have got to go out, leaving Cow to babysit Chicken, much to his disappointment.
29a	3a	"Cow Fly"	Rumen Petkov and Dave Brain	David Feiss and Michael Ryan	Chris Savino	September 15, 1998	34-5705
Cow avoids boredom by making friends with a fly, much to the annoyance of Chicken.
29b	3b	"Where Am I?"	Dave Brain	David Feiss and Michael Ryan	Bob Camp	September 15, 1998	34-5705
While on her way back inside for lunch, Cow ends up getting lost in the garden and starts to rely on survival instincts.
30a	4a	"Sergeant Weenie Arms"	Ron Myrick	Maxwell Atoms	Maxwell Atoms	September 22, 1998	34-5711
Chicken, Flem and Earl are trained by action figure, Sergeant Weenie Arms, to become weenie marines like him.
30b	4b	"Sow and Chicken"	Rumen Petkov	Sherri Schrader	John Holmquist	September 22, 1998	34-5709
Cow and Chicken's anarchic cousin, Sow, comes over for a visit. When she comes over to school, Cow ends up taking the blame for Sow's misguided actions.
31a	5a	"Me an' My Dog" "Me & My Dog"	Robert Alvarez	Pilar Feiss and Michael Ryan	David Feiss	September 29, 1998	34-5704
Cow adopts an invisible dog as a pet.
31b	5b	"Cow's Dream Catcher"	Bill Reed	David Feiss and Steve Marmel	Charlie Bean	September 29, 1998	34-5710
A night in the tree house turns into a nightmare for Chicken, Flem, and Earl when they break Cow's dream catcher.
32a	6a	"Grandma at the Mall"	Bill Reed	David Feiss and Michael Ryan	Nora Johnson	October 6, 1998	34-5717
Grandmama takes Cow and Chicken over to a mall, where they attempt to find a Grampa. While this old-timer is blind as a bat, Chicken uses this to his advantage in order to spend time with best buddies, Flem and Earl.
32b	6b	"Chicken in the Bathroom"	Brian Hogan	Jeff Kwitney	Marc Perry	October 6, 1998	34-5712
Chicken hates taking a bath, so he just lie down in the empty tub. Cow, Mom, and Dad are all desperate to use the toilet and attempt to persuade Chicken to take his bath.
33a	7a	"Chickens Don't Fly"	Robert Alvarez	Gary Wilson	Maxwell Atoms	October 13, 1998	34-5715
While waiting to board a plane for his and Cow's visit to Brunei, Chicken suddenly has a fear of flying.
33b	7b	"P.E."	Michael Longden	David Feiss and Steve Marmel	Lynne Naylor	October 13, 1998	34-5714
Chicken, Flem and Earl are on their first day of junior high school, where in P.E, they play dodgeball. While they are in the showers, their clothes are stolen.
34a	8a	"Playin' Hookie"	Dave Brain	David Feiss and Steve Marmel	David Feiss	October 20, 1998	34-5713
Realizing that he has failed to study for a math test, Chicken pretends he is sick, and tries anything to prove it to Mom and Dad. When he is found out, he is sent back to school, only to realize that the math teacher has fallen ill and the test was subsequently replaced by a Chocolate test, which the class thoroughly enjoys.
34b	8b	"Chicken Lips"	Rumen Petkov	Gary Wilson	Lynne Naylor	October 20, 1998	34-5708
Unlike Cow, Chicken cannot whistle, and he tries to get lessons from Professor Hineybottom (the Red Guy).
35a	9a	"The Day I Was Born"	Robert Alvarez	David Feiss and Michael Ryan	Nora Johnson	October 27, 1998	34-5716
Cow attempts to learn about the day she was born, despite mixed views and opinions.
35b	9b	"Factory Follies"	Brian Hogan	Vincent Davis, Sami Rank and Michael Ryan	Nora Johnson	October 27, 1998	34-5722
The Red Guy works as a slave-driving boss of a factory. When he tries to celebrate his birthday, his employees do not come, so he decides to liven things up for himself.
36a	10a	"101 Uses for Cow and Chicken" "Uses for Cow & Chicken"	David Brain	David Feiss and Michael Ryan	Lynne Naylor	November 3, 1998	34-5720
After playing with a price tagging gun at a supermarket, Cow and Chicken are purchased by the Red Guy.
36b	10b	"Intelligent Life?"	Rumen Petkov	David Feiss and Michael Ryan	Greg Miller	November 3, 1998	34-5718
Using a home-made rocket, Cow travels to a distant planet, where she meets up with the Red Guy, who claims to be an alien. She takes him back to Earth, where he claims that the solution to the world's problems lies in puppets.
37a	11a	"Be Careful What You Wish For"	Dave Brain	Steve Marmel	Paul McEvoy	November 10, 1998	34-5721
Chicken's wish for Cow to shut up comes true. When he is run over by a truck, he regrets it after being sentenced to 50 years in prison for jaywalking (although the truck driver was at fault) and Cow refuses to clear his name.
37b	11b	"Lost at Sea"	Bill Reed	David Feiss and Michael Ryan	Carey Yost	November 10, 1998	34-5725
Flem and Earl wake up naked and stranded in a hot ocean. They remember the great moments and dreams they've had together, even with help from the Red Guy.
38a	12a	"Night of the Ed!"	Brian Hogan	David Feiss and Michael Ryan	Maxwell Atoms	November 17, 1998	34-5729
The family have a new pet in the form of a wild jackal named Ed.
38b	12b	"Cow's Pie"	Robert Alvarez	Genndy Tartakovsky	Genndy Tartakovsky	November 17, 1998	34-5726
Cow tries to persuade Chicken to eat her newly-baked pie.
39a	13a	"Professor Longhorn Steer"	Brian Hogan	Michael Ryan & David Feiss	David Feiss	May 3, 1999	34-5727
In an unsuccessful attempt to prove to Cow and Chicken that the Earth is flat, Dad brings in his brother, Professor Longhorn Steer, to teach them proper education.
39b	13b	"A Couple of Skating Fools"	Robert Alvarez	David Feiss & Michael Ryan	Lynne Naylor	May 3, 1999	34-5723
Chicken and Earl compete against Flem and the Red Guy in a figure skating contest. Unfortunately, when Earl is left injured, Chicken tries to find another way to win.

=== Season 4 (1999) ===
Episodes 40, 42–44, & 48 were shown as part of a special promotion called "Smelly Telly", where viewers could use scratch and sniff cards to smell certain odors at different parts of the episodes, as instructed on screen.

No. overall	No. in season	Title	Animation direction by	Story by	Storyboard by	Original release date	Prod. code
40a	1a	"Chachi, the Chewing Gum Seal"	Brian Hogan	Maxwell Atoms	Maxwell Atoms	April 26, 1999	34-5732
In order to prove to Chicken that she is artistic, Cow creates a seal out of chewing gum. Eventually, she wishes that her work of art, affectionately named Chachi, could live, which soon becomes a reality (and then a nightmare when the seal badmouths Cow).
40b	1b	"Black Sheep of the Family"	Dave Brain	David Feiss & Michael Ryan	Bob Camp	April 26, 1999	34-5734
Cow and Chicken's cousin, Black Sheep (who lives up to both sides of his name), has come over for a visit (this is a problem for Mom and Dad, who both run away for the duration of his visit).
41a	2a	"The Full Mounty"	Ron Myrick	Written by: David Feiss & Michael Ryan	Carey Yost	May 4, 1999	34-5728
It's "Bring Your Kid to Work" Day, and Cow and Chicken are with Dad at his office, but a Canadian Mountie (the Red Guy) constantly stalks the siblings around the entire building.
41b	2b	"Mall Cop"	Robert Alvarez	Nora Johnson & Steve Marmel	Nora Johnson	May 4, 1999	34-5731
Shopping at the mall becomes a problem for Cow when she and Chicken are pursued by a Mall Cop (the Red Guy) for supposed shoplifting.
42a	3a	"Cow's Toys"	Bill Reed	Written by: Steve Marmel & Michael Ryan	David Feiss	April 28, 1999	34-5724
Cow's favorite toys, Crabs the Warthog, Piles the Beaver and Manure the Bear, make their escape out of the house on their own quest: to find "Maiden Hong Kong".
42b	3b	"I Scream, Man"	Brian Hogan	Gary Wilson	David Feiss	April 28, 1999	34-5719
Arbor Day is coming, and Cow and Chicken want some ice cream from the ice cream man (the Red Guy).
43a	4a	"Cloud Nine"	Bill Reed	Scott Morse	Scott Morse	April 29, 1999	34-5733
Chicken wants to ride on a kiddie's jet stationed outside a hardware store, but when he gets the money from Cow, it gets taken away.
43b	4b	"Send in the Clowns"	Robert Alvarez & Ron Myrick	Fred Belford & David Feiss	Carey Yost	April 29, 1999	34-5735
Dad cannot get along with his new neighbors, who happen to be clowns. Cow falls in love with the clown son when it is learned they go to the same school.
44a	5a	"The Big Move"	Brian Hogan	David Feiss & Michael Ryan	Bob Camp	April 27, 1999	34-5735
Cow and Chicken are moving to a new home, and remember the great moments they've had at their old house.
44b	5b	"Cow's Magic Blanket"	Dave Brain	David Feiss & Michael Ryan	Maxwell Atoms	April 27, 1999	34-5740
Cow still has a security blanket (which happens to be Supercow's cape), but Chicken objects to her still carrying around such an item at her age, which leads to it being thrown out on the way to school. While Cow is depressed, the principal (the Red Guy) decides to torment Flem and Earl.
45a	6a	"Snail Boy"	Ron Myrick	David Feiss & Michael Ryan	Bob Camp	May 5, 1999	34-5744
Cow and Chicken's cousin, Snail Boy is coming to their school. He has proven to humiliate them in some ways, such as becoming a model for figure drawing.
45b	6b	"The Penalty Wheel"	Dave Brain	David Feiss & Michael Ryan	Nora Johnson	May 5, 1999	34-5739
Cow, Chicken, Flem and Earl are all competing in a game show called "You Ben Panced?" hosted by Benjamin Panced (the Red Guy). The challenges are virtually impossible to complete in such a short period of time, resulting in the losers spinning the penalty wheel.
46a	7a	"Invisible Cow"	Brian Hogan	David Feiss and Michael Ryan	Arthur Filloy	May 7, 1999	34-5742
After being sold an invisibility potion by the Red Guy, Cow really believes she is invisible, despite not drinking it. She goes on to cause trouble, which she, somehow, gets away with.
46b	7b	"Monster in the Closet"	Robert Alvarez	David Feiss and Michael Ryan	Nora Johnson	May 7, 1999	34-5745
Cow befriends a scary-looking monster that lives in her bedroom closet.
47a	8a	"Chicken's Fairy Tale"	Rumen Petkov	David Feiss & Michael Ryan	Bob Camp & David Feiss	May 6, 1999	34-5746
Chicken, Flem and Earl find a beanstalk in the back garden, and it soon follows a story in the style of Jack and the Beanstalk.
47b	8b	"Magic Chicken"	Bill Reed	David Feiss & Michael Ryan	Pat Ventura & David Feiss	May 6, 1999	34-5747
Chicken hosts a magic show in front of his friends and family. It soon becomes no laughing matter when he makes Cow's udder disappear, which ends up on the Red Guy.
48a	9a	"Major Wedgie"	Bill Reed	David Feiss & Michael Ryan	David Feiss	April 30, 1999	34-5737
Mom and Dad tell Cow and Chicken how they first met. This involves boot camp and a grumpy superior named Major Wedgie (the Red Guy).
48b	9b	"The Loneliest Cow"	Dave Brain	David Feiss & Michael Ryan	Maxwell Atoms	April 30, 1999	34-5751
In an effort to escape loneliness, Cow befriends an orange tree stationed in the back garden, much to Chicken's disgust.
49a	10a	"Cow's Horse"	Ron Myrick	David Feiss & Michael Ryan	Nora Johnson	June 18, 1999	34-5750
Cow adopts a horse named Blackie, much to the disapproval of Chicken, Mom, and Dad.
49b	10b	"Red Butler"	Robert Alvarez	David Feiss & Michael Ryan	Carey Yost	July 16, 1999	34-5748
A butler named Hiney (the Red Guy) comes over to serve Cow and Chicken, even in school time.
50a	11a	"Cow's a Beauty"	Bill Reed	David Feiss & Michael Ryan	Arthur Filloy	June 18, 1999	34-5743
The Red Guy attempts to enter Cow into a beauty pageant.
50b	11b	"Piano Lessons"	Rumen Petkov	David Feiss & Michael Ryan	Paul McEvoy	June 18, 1999	34-5749
The Red Guy teaches Cow and Chicken piano lessons in the hopes that they perform well to a sell-out audience.
51a	12a	"Duck, Duck Chicken!"	Brian Hogan	David Feiss & Steve Marmel	David Feiss	July 16, 1999	34-5736
Dr. Hiney (the Red Guy) gives Chicken surgery, transforming him into a duck.
51b	12b	"The Great Pantzini"	Dave Brain	David Feiss & Michael Ryan	Paul McEvoy	July 16, 1999	34-5741
Cow and Chicken are sent to join the Great Pantzini (the Red Guy's) circus. He originally has Cow as a trapeze artist, and Chicken as a fire eater, but then settles to have them in as clowns.
52a	13a	"The Cow and Chicken Blues"	Bill Reed	David Feiss & Michael Ryan	David Feiss	August 13, 1999	34-5730
Cow and Chicken are feeling down, and visit their next door neighbor, who happens to be a famous blues musician. Through song, he tells them a wild tale.
52b	13b	"The Ballad of Cow and Chicken"	Dave Brain	David Feiss & Michael Ryan	David Feiss	August 13, 1999	34-5752
Teacher, Flem, and Earl sing a ballad, which involves Cow and Chicken being pursued by the Red Guy.

== See also ==
- List of I Am Weasel episodes
