= Dessert island =

Dessert island may refer to:

- Floating island (dessert), an "island" of meringue floating in a "sea" of Crème anglaise
- Dessert Island (I Am Weasel), an episode of I Am Weasel

== See also ==
- Desert island, an uninhabited island
