= Infinite monkey theorem in popular culture =

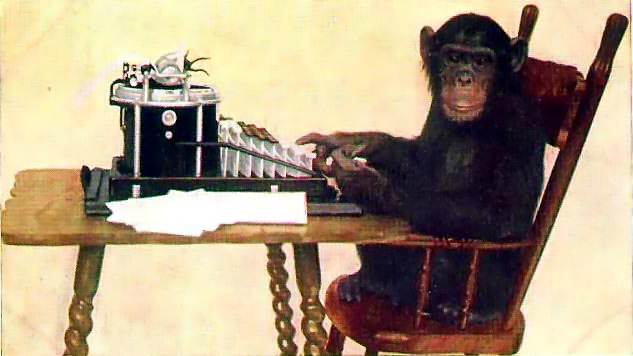
Given enough time, a hypothetical chimpanzee typing at random would, as part of its output, almost surely produce one of Shakespeare's plays (or any other text).

The infinite monkey theorem and its associated imagery is considered a popular and proverbial illustration of the mathematics of probability, widely known to the general public because of its transmission through popular culture.

However, this popularity as either presented to or taken in the public's mind often oversimplifies or confuses important aspects of the different scales of the concepts involved: infinity, probability, and time – all of these are in measures beyond average human experience and practical comprehension or comparison.

== Popularity ==
The history of the imagery of "typing monkeys" dates back at least as far as Émile Borel's use of the metaphor in his essay in 1913, and this imagery has recurred many times since in a variety of media.

- The Hoffmann and Hofmann paper (2001) referenced a collection compiled by Jim Reeds, titled "The Parable of the Monkeys – a.k.a. The Topos of the Monkeys and the Typewriters".
- The enduring, widespread and popular nature of the knowledge of the theorem was noted in a 2001 paper, "Monkeys, Typewriters and Networks – the Internet in the Light of the Theory of Accidental Excellence". In their introduction to that paper, Hoffmann and Hofmann stated: "The Internet is home to a vast assortment of quotations and experimental designs concerning monkeys and typewriters. They all expand on the theory ... that if an infinite number of monkeys were left to bang on an infinite number of typewriters, sooner or later they would accidentally reproduce the complete works of William Shakespeare (or even just one of his sonnets)."
- In 2002, a Washington Post article said: "Plenty of people have had fun with the famous notion that an infinite number of monkeys with an infinite number of typewriters and an infinite amount of time could eventually write the works of Shakespeare".
- In 2003, an Arts Council-funded piece of performance art at the University of Plymouth involving an experiment with six Celebes crested macaques and a computer keyboard received widespread press coverage.
- In 2007, the theorem was listed by Wired magazine in a list of eight classic thought experiments.
- Another study of the history was published in the introduction to a study published in 2007 by Terry Butler, "Monkeying Around with Text".

Today, popular interest in the typing monkeys is sustained by numerous appearances in literature, television and radio, music, and the Internet, as well as graphic novels and stand-up comedy routines. Several collections of cultural references to the theorem have been published.

The following thematic timelines are based on these existing collections. The timelines are not comprehensive – instead, they document notable examples of references to the theorem appearing in various media. The initial timeline starts with some of the early history following Borel, and the later timelines record examples of the history, from the stories by Maloney and Borges in the 1940s, up to the present day.

== Early history ==
- 1913 – Émile Borel's essay – “Mécanique Statistique et Irréversibilité”.
- 1928 – Arthur Eddington's book – The Nature of the Physical World
- 1931 – James Jeans' book – The Mysterious Universe
- 1939 – Jorge Luis Borges' essay – “The Total Library”

== Literature ==
- 1940 – In "Inflexible Logic" by Russell Maloney, a short story that appeared in The New Yorker, the protagonist feels that his wealth obligates him to support the sciences, so he tests the theory. His monkeys immediately set to work typing, without error, classics of fiction and nonfiction. The rich man is amused to see unexpurgated versions of Samuel Pepys' diaries, of which he owns only a copy of a bowdlerised edition; however, the experiment ends prematurely when the mathematician to whom he has revealed the incredible occurrence returns with a rifle and kills the six monkeys. Before it succumbs to its wounds, the sixth monkey laboriously begins to type Uncle Tom's Cabin.
- 1969 – "Uncollected Works", a short story by Lin Carter, describes a machine that rapidly simulates the infinite monkeys with the result that it generates the sum total of human writing from first principles, and onward into the future.
- 1970 – A humorous short story by R. A. Lafferty, "Been a Long, Long Time" (Fantastic, December), tells the story of an angel who is punished by having to supervise (for trillions of years) randomly typing monkeys who are attempting to produce a perfect copy of the collected works of Shakespeare.
- 1979 – Chapter XXIII of The Neverending Story by Michael Ende describes a city full of people that have lost their memories, overseen by a monkey. The monkey entertains these people by letting them play a game of dice with letters on them. The monkey explains that since these people have lost their capability to write stories themselves, the game will make it possible for them to produce sentences, stories, or poems by pure chance. Eventually, this game would produce any story ever told, including the Neverending Story itself.
- 1987 – In the one-act play Words, Words, Words by David Ives, three monkeys named Milton, Swift, and Kafka have been confined to a cage by Dr. Rosenbaum, who has the hypothesis: "Three monkeys hitting keys at random on typewriters for an infinite amount of time will almost surely produce Hamlet." The play's humour mainly involves literary references, including moments when the random typing produces passages from great works of literature.
- 1996 – In Jim Cowan's short story "The Spade of Reason" (published in Century 4, 1996), the main character seeks to find meaning in the universe through text randomly generated through various means; the original program he uses to do so is something he dubs the "Motorola Monkey".*
- 2012 – In the novel A Short Stay in Hell by Steven L. Peck, the protagonist dies and is sent to hell. He finds himself in a massive library where every book contains a unique sequence of random characters, all of the exact same length. He can only leave when he finds the book that accurately describes his life story. At the beginning of the novel he tells the reader he has been searching for hundreds of billions of years and found multiple coherent works.
- 2023 – In The New Yorker January 16, 2023 "Shouts & Murmurs" Department, a one-page satirical take-off entitled "The Infinite-Monkey Theorem: Field Notes" by Reuven Perlman. Here, an embedded reporter monitors "[m]onkeys and typewriters as far as the eye can see" for most of December 2022 to eventually report: "Monkey No. 7160043—nicknamed Coco—experienced a 90-minute burst of creative energy and has successfully and independently written the entirety of Shakespeare's Hamlet! The theorem has been confirmed!" Coco is ecstatic until she starts to reread the manuscript "with a furrowed brow", and then lights her copy of Hamlet on fire and announces her retirement from writing, and then her plans to apply to grad school in the fall. The monkeys then resume their unproductivity and humorous self-distractions to avoid the task of writing.

== Film ==
- 1959 – In the film On the Beach, when wireless Morse code signals are detected by radio operators on the carrier Melbourne, the Australian admiral mentions "the old story about an infinite number of monkeys and an infinite number of typewriters", and that "one of them has to end up writing King Lear".
- 2021 – The theorem was mentioned in the film The Boss Baby: Family Business.
- 2020 – The theorem was mentioned in the film Spontaneous.
- 2025 – In Superman, Lex Luthor engineers hundreds of monkeys to write negative comments about Superman on social media.

== Radio and television ==
- 1978 – In his radio play, The Hitchhiker's Guide to the Galaxy, Douglas Adams invoked the theorem to illustrate the power of the ‘Infinite Improbability Drive' that powered a spaceship. From Episode 2: "Ford, there's an infinite number of monkeys outside who want to talk to us about this script for Hamlet they've worked out".
- 1983 – In the Doctor Who episode "Mawdryn Undead", the Doctor mentions the theorem in passing (quoting it as "a treeful of monkeys"), stating to Tegan that "you and I both know, at the end of a millennium they'd still be tapping out gibberish." Tegan's response: "And you'd be tapping it out right alongside them."
- 1993 – In The Simpsons episode "Last Exit to Springfield", Mr. Burns has a room with 1,000 monkeys at 1,000 typewriters, one of which he chastises for mistyping a word in the opening sentence of Charles Dickens' A Tale of Two Cities:
  "'It was the best of times, it was the blurst of times?' You stupid monkey!"
- 1998 – An advertisement for Molson Canadian beer depicts an array of typing chimpanzees filling a seemingly endless cathedral-like structure while a voice-over sardonically asks "Could an infinite number of monkeys on an infinite number of typewriters eventually define what it is to be Canadian?".
- 1998 – In the "Battle of the Sexists" episode of That '70s Show, Eric Forman yells after his girlfriend Donna Pinciotti scored during a game of basketball:
  "Pinciotti actually scores! Hell freezes over! A monkey types Hamlet!"
- 1998 – In the animated series Fat Dog Mendoza, one of the series main villains, Doctor Rectangle, keeps a basement full of monkeys typing away on typewriters. Rectangle mistakenly believes that he can directly and practically use the infinite monkey theorem, using real monkeys and typewriters, to create a great work of literature or come up with a plan that will make him famous and/or powerful. It is also believed that, unbeknown to Doctor Rectangle, the monkeys are in fact intelligent and type things at random to amuse themselves and receive a steady income of bananas.
- 1999 – The infinite monkey theorem is the subject of a brief sketch in the Histeria! episode "Super Writers".
- 1999 – "A Troo Storee", an episode of I Am Weasel, features a large room filled with several types of monkeys with typewriters who are working on a novel. When Weasel tries to pay them in bananas, they consider it an insult and quit their job, all except for Baboon.
- 2000 – In the Family Guy episode "The King is Dead", Lois questions Peter's creativity, to which he replies: "Oh, art-schmart. Put enough monkeys in a room with a typewriter they'll produce Shakespeare". The scene then cuts to several monkeys in a room, arguing over which flower is most appropriate in the famous line from Romeo and Juliet.
- 2001 – In The Lone Gunmen episode "Planet of the Frohikes", a team of about 20 monkeys is seen typing away at computer terminals, producing gibberish. A scientist is shocked to discover that one of them is typing out Hamlet's soliloquy. When he returns with colleagues, the text is random gibberish.
- 2001 – In the sixth episode of the first season of The Ricky Gervais Show, comedian Ricky Gervais tries to explain this theorem to Karl Pilkington, who refuses to believe it possible. In attempting to explain the mathematics behind the theorem, Gervais eventually gives up and storms out of the room when, after a long explication by Gervais and Stephen Merchant, Pilkington says, "If they haven't even read Shakespeare, how do they know what they're doin?"
- 2002 – In the 2000 Years of Radio episode Tempest FM, set after Shakespeare's death in 1616, it is revealed that his plays were written by typewriter-using monkeys that he kept enslaved in his cellar.
- 2004 – In "The Science Fair Affair" episode of The Adventures of Jimmy Neutron: Boy Genius, Sheen's science fair project is having an iguana sprawled on a typewriter under the assumption that it will "write the next great American novel".
- 2005 – At the end of the Robot Chicken episode "Badunkadunk", the Stoopid Monkey production logo's background is made up of upside-down text pertaining to the Infinite Monkey Theorem.
- 2005 – In the Veronica Mars episode "Cheatty Cheatty Bang Bang", Veronica, commenting on the sudden realization she did know David 'Curly' Moran says:
  "Somewhere, those million chimps, with their million typewriters, must've written King Lear."
- 2006 – In June 2006, The Colbert Report featured a humorous segment on how many monkeys it would take for various works. This was in response to comments made in the news on monkeys typing out the Bible or the Qur'an. According to Colbert, one million monkeys typing for eternity would produce Shakespeare, ten thousand (drinking) monkeys typing for ten thousand years would produce Hemingway, and ten monkeys typing for three days would produce a work of Dan Brown.
- 2007 – In an episode of the daytime soap opera The Young and the Restless (broadcast January and February 2007 in Canada and the USA), when Colleen Carlton copies scrambled letters obtained from the Grugeon Reliquary onto a dry board, Professor Adrian Korbel jokingly asks if she's testing the Infinite Monkey Theorem. When asked what this is, he replies:
  "Thomas Henry Huxley said if you gave keyboards to an infinite amount of monkeys, and gave said monkeys an infinite amount of time ... Well it is safe to say ... you are not the magic monkey."
- 2009 – The BBC Radio 4 series The Infinite Monkey Cage derives its name from the Infinite Monkey Theorem.
- 2011 – On an episode of the topical comedy programme Mock the Week, comedian Micky Flanagan references it in a segment of "Scenes We'd Like to See."
- 2016 – In an episode of Downton Abbey, Lady Mary remarks, “A monkey will type out the Bible if you leave it long enough.”
- 2022 – The theorem is the basis for the Adult Swim miniseries "The Hamlet Factory". It follows three monkeys working in an office with infinite monkeys with typewriters trying to write Hamlet.

== Video games ==
- 2000 – When talking to Inspector Canard in Escape from Monkey Island, he says that "if [he] had a monkey for every time some penny-ante crook tried to pin their criminal malfeasance on Pegnose Pete ... [he would] have enough monkeys to work out a reasonable sequel to Hamlet by now."
- 2004 – in the PS2 game Killzone, one of the characters, Colonel Hakha, remarks "Even a monkey can write Shakespeare, given enough time."

== Comics and graphic novels ==
- 1981 – Fone, a science fiction comic by Milo Manara.
- 1989 – In the comic strip Dilbert, Dogbert tells Dilbert that his poem would take "three monkeys, ten minutes".
- 1990 – The Animal Man comic by Grant Morrison (a revival of the Animal Man DC character) contained an issue (Monkey Puzzles) including a monkey who typed not only the works of Shakespeare, but comic books as well. The TPB this issue is collected in (Deus ex Machina – 2003) featured an "infinite" number of Grant Morrisons typing on the cover.
- 1998 – Jason in the comic strip FoxTrot makes Peter a program to generate random numbers of the alphabet, with Peter stating that "If it works for Hamlet, why won't it work for a Hamlet book report?"
- 2008 – The cartoonist Ruben Bolling satirized the thought experiment in his Tom the Dancing Bug cartoon, with a monkey asking "How can I credibly delay Hamlet's revenge until Act V" in the final frame.
- 2008 – In a comic book written by Scott McCloud about Google Chrome, monkeys on laptops are used as an analogy to random data.
- 2009 – In the graphic novel Umineko: When They Cry, Bernkastel was involved in a situation which had her make a miracle out of a nearly impossible situation. This was compared to the monkey theorem, trying at random to obtain a miracle that had an incredibly low chance.

== Software and internet culture ==
- 1979 – Apple Computer released Bruce Tognazzini's "The Infinite No. Of Monkeys", a humorous demonstration of Apple BASIC, on their DOS 3.2 disk for the Apple II computer.
- 1995 – "The famous Brett Watson" published his Internet paper, "The Mathematics of Monkeys and Shakespeare" which was, in 2000, to be included as a reference in RFC 2795 (see below)
- 1996 – Robert Wilensky once jocularly remarked, "We've all heard that a million monkeys banging on a million typewriters will eventually reproduce the entire works of Shakespeare. Now, thanks to the Internet, we know this is not true." This version of the internet analogy "began appearing as a very frequent email and web-page epigraph starting in 1997".
  - A variant appeared in USENET at about the same time: "The Experiment has begun! A million monkeys and a million keyboards. We call it USENET."
- 2000 – The IETF Internet standards committee's April Fools' Day RFC proposed an "Infinite Monkey Protocol Suite (IMPS)", a method of directing a farm of infinitely many monkeys over the Internet.
- 2005 – Goats, a webcomic illustrated by Jonathan Rosenberg, started in August 2005 an ongoing story line named infinite typewriters where several characters accidentally teleport to an alternate dimension. There they find that this dimension is populated by monkeys with typewriters, presumably typing the scripts of many other dimensions.
- 2006 – The Infinite Monkey Project was launched by predictive text company T9. The Europe-wide project sees users, unknown to each other, text a word of their choosing to the Website. The text message is free and as it continues the words are combined to form lyrics. The lyrics are then made into a song by the Hip Hop artist Sparo which will be released as an album. If any of the tracks becomes a hit the people who texted in the words for the lyrics will receive royalties from the project.
- 2007 – A website named One Million Monkeys Typing was introduced, a collaborative writing site where anyone can sign up and add writing "snippets" that others can add on to, eventually creating stories with many outcomes.
- 2008 – An issue of MAD shows a depiction of the Infinite Monkey Theorem which states that when good monkeys go bad, one of the infinite monkeys would surely plagiarize A Tale of Two Cities.
- 2008 – Monkeys are depicted typing random bits of text in Google's online comic book advertising their Google Chrome Web Browser.
- 2009 – Infinite Monkey Comics was launched, which features a random comic generator that creates three-panel comics by placing a random tweet from Twitter over a random image from Flickr based on keywords of the user's choosing. The result is a nearly inexhaustible collection of potential comics generated by the random musings and typing of internet users.
- 2009 – Monkeys With Typewriters draws its namesake from the theorem.
- 2010 – Lyrois Beating a Million Monkeys, a somewhat sarcastic look at contemporary art, uses the monkeys as a metaphor.
- 2011 – www.shakespearean-monkeys.com is a social literature website, where the users are the monkeys.
- 2013 – In the YouTube series Sword Art Online Abridged, the main character Kirito uses the phrase "monkeys and typewriters" to describe his acquaintance Klein grouping up with weaker players, implying that there is next to no chance they will all survive at their skill level.
- 2015 – GoofyxGrid@Home is a BOINC volunteer computing project that checks for the Infinite Monkey Theorem.
- 2020 – Monkeytype, a website for conducting typing tests, also draws its namesake from the theorem.
- 2025 – Monkeys.zip launches an ongoing experiment where users claim monkeys on an infinitely large grid. Monkeys type random text which is checked against all of Shakespeare's works, and are rewarded with cosmetic and customization items. Progress and statistics are tracked for each word, Shakespeare work, and monkey.

== Stand-up comedy ==
- 1960 onwards – Comedian Bob Newhart had a stand-up routine in which a lab technician monitoring an "infinitely many monkeys" experiment discovered that one of the monkeys has typed something of interest. A typical punchline would be: "Hey, Harry! This one looks a little famous: 'To be or not to be – that is the gggzornonplatt.'"

== Music ==
- 1979 – The debut album by Leeds punk rock band the Mekons is called The Quality of Mercy Is Not Strnen. Originally released on Virgin Records in the United Kingdom, its cover features a photo, not of a monkey, but of a typing chimpanzee. The title refers to a Shakespeare quote from The Merchant of Venice: "The quality of mercy is not strain'd".

== See also ==
- Model for a rare event comparison
