= Rumen Petkov =

Rumen Petkov may refer to:

- Rumen Petkov (artist) (1948–2018), Bulgarian animator, painter and comic creator
- Rumen Petkov (gymnast) (born 1959), Bulgarian gymnast
- Rumen Petkov (politician) (born 1961), Bulgarian politician, former Minister of the Interior
