= Charlie Bean (filmmaker) =

American filmmaker

- Occupations: Filmmaker; animator; writer; director; storyboard artist; voice actor
- Years active: 1990–present

Charlie Bean is an American filmmaker, animator, storyboard artist, and voice actor, known for directing The Lego Ninjago Movie with Paul Fisher and Bob Logan and his work on Tron: Uprising as a director and executive producer. He also worked as a storyboard artist on Dexter's Laboratory, Samurai Jack, The Powerpuff Girls, I Am Weasel, and Cow and Chicken, as well as a director and storyboard supervisor on Robotboy. He co-created two pilots for Cartoon Network, one with Don Shank and Carey Yost, and one with Chris Reccardi, which were respectively entitled Buy One, Get One Free and IMP, Inc. Bean was also a layout artist on The Ren and Stimpy Show, Animaniacs, and Batman: The Animated Series.

== Filmography ==
=== Film ===
Year	Title	Notes	Role
1990	The Natural History of Parking Lots	Main Role	Chris
1992	Tiny Toon Adventures: How I Spent My Vacation	Character Layout Artist & Posing Artist	N/A
1996	Podunk Possum in One Step Beyond	Layout Artist	N/A
1996	Buy One, Get One Free	Co-Creator, Writer, & Director	N/A
1998	Hercules and Xena – The Animated Movie: The Battle for Mount Olympus	Layout Artist & Storyboard Artist	N/A
2002	The Powerpuff Girls Movie	Story, Writer, & Storyboard Artist	N/A
2013	Black Saint	Actor	N/A
2017	The Lego Batman Movie	Additional Voice	N/A
2017	The Lego Ninjago Movie	Director	N/A
2019	Lady and the Tramp	Director	N/A
2028	Donkey	Director	N/A

=== Television ===
Year	Title	Notes	Additional Notes	Role
1990–1992	Tiny Toon Adventures	Model Designer; Character Layout Artist; Storyboard Artist	1990–1992; 1990–1991 "Here's Hamton"	N/A
1991–1993	The Ren & Stimpy Show	Layout Artist	Seasons 1–2	N/A
1992	Batman: The Animated Series	Character Layout Artist	4 Episodes	N/A
1993	Adventures of Sonic the Hedgehog	Prop Designer	65 Episodes	N/A
1993	Animaniacs	Character Layout Artist	1 Episode	N/A
1994	The Critic	Character Layout Artist	2 Episodes	N/A
1994	Beethoven	Character Designer	12 Episodes	N/A
1995	The Shnookums & Meat Funny Cartoon Show	Character Layout	13 Episodes	N/A
1995	Timon & Pumbaa	Layout Artist & Animation Layout Artist	3 Episodes; 5 Episodes	N/A
1995–1996	The Twisted Tales of Felix the Cat	Layout Artist	Season 1	N/A
1996–2003	Dexter's Laboratory	Layout Artist; Storyboard Artist; Writer; Story	Seasons 1–4; Season 1, Season 4 Season 4: 3 Episodes; Season 4: 5 Episodes	N/A
1997–1998	I Am Weasel	Storyboard Artist	Seasons 1–2	N/A
1998	Cow and Chicken	Storyboard Artist	Seasons 2–3	N/A
1999–2001, 2004	The Powerpuff Girls	Storyboard Artist; Writer; Prop Designer; Character Designer; Voice Role	Seasons 2–4; Season 4 Season 6 Season 6 Seasons 5–6	Himself & Dr. Yost
2001	IMP Inc.	Co-Creator, Writer, Director, Layout Artist, & Animation Timing	Pilots for Cartoon Network's 2nd Big Pick marathon	N/A
2001	A Kitty Bobo Show	Animation Layout	Pilots for Cartoon Network's 2nd Big Pick marathon	N/A
2001–2003	Samurai Jack	Writer & Storyboard Artist	Seasons 1–4	N/A
2003	Whatever Happened to... Robot Jones?	Writer & Storyboard Artist	2 Episodes	N/A
2004	Johnny Bravo	Storyboard Artist	"Witch-ay Woman"	N/A
2005–2006	Robotboy	Director; Storyboard Supervisor	Season 1	N/A
2006	Class of 3000	Art Director	"The Devil and Li'l D"	N/A
2007	Foster's Home for Imaginary Friends	Writer & Story	"The Buck Swaps Here"	N/A
2007	SpongeBob SquarePants	Storyboard Director & Writer	"The Two Faces of Squidward"	N/A
2011–2013	The Amazing World of Gumball	Special Thanks	Seasons 1–2	N/A
2012–2013	Tron: Uprising	Executive Producer, Director, & Voice Actor	Additional Voices	Himself "2012"
