= Treasure Planet (1982 film) =

Bulgarian animated science fiction film

- Bulgarian: Planetata na sukrovishtata
- Directed by: Rumen Petkov
- Written by: Boris Angelov; Yosif Peretz
- Produced by: Ya. Kitzov
- Cinematography: Stoycho Dzhambazov; F. Arnaoudov
- Edited by: V. Samyuilov
- Music by: Boris Karadimchev; Tangra
- Animation by: Nastimir Tzachev; Peter Yandov; Ventzislav Krastev; Nadezhda Slavova; Boiko Kanev; Antoaneta Botusharova
- Production company: Sofia Animation Studio
- Release date: 27 May 1982
- Running time: 62 minutes
- Country: Bulgaria
- Language: Bulgarian

Treasure Planet (Bulgarian: Планетата на съкровищата, Planetata na sukrovishtata) is a 1982 Bulgarian animated science fiction film directed by Rumen Petkov and produced by the Sofia Animation Studio. The 62-minute movie is a science fiction adaptation of Robert Louis Stevenson's 1883 adventure novel Treasure Island, and was released 20 years before Disney's Treasure Planet, another movie with the same concept. The Bulgarian band "Tangra" did the movie's music.

== Story ==
From inside a black hole, a young man named Filipe recounts his adventure. On an entirely artificial Earth where nature ceased to exist long ago, a bio-robot named Black Dog confronts old space pirate and his fellow Billy Bones for a star map, leading to the treasure of Captain Flint. Billy refuses, and is threatened with the Black Spot by Black Dog. After dropping trumpets onto Black Dog, Billy tries to fly away in a wheelchair, but is cornered and forced to jump rope until he hands the map over. After handing over a bomb instead, Black Dog inflicts the Black Spot on Billy, under the guise of determining if Billy's hand is ticklish. Billy, fulfilling his "duty as a conscientious pirate to drop dead at once" according to the pirate code, allows himself to suddenly die, but turns the map over to Filipe.

Filipe returns to his captain, Commander Smollett, who had been busy fending off several trickster robots, dressed in disguise, who had been asking for information about the map, in addition to wanting a haircut and a hamburger. When presented with the map by Filipe, Smollett organizes a crew to retrieve it. Smollett appoints Filipe as cabin boy, and brings aboard the peg-legged first mate Long John Silver and his robots; Black Dog and the other trickster robots.

Blasting off into space aboard the vessel Hispaniola, the long journey is interrupted by a power failure. The robots perform an elaborate song and dance, and are berated by Silver. Filipe, having snuck in to observe, activates another one of Silver's robots, a mechanical parrot who tells Silver that he no longer turns him on. Silver reveals his plan to steal the map, get the treasure, and become "master of the whole universe".

In the middle of an emergency, the crew is bombarded with electrical bolts. Filipe's conscience is transported to the past where he is now Jim Hawkins on an old wooden ship, where Smollett identifies the existence of both Treasure Island and Robert Louis Stevenson. They are attacked by several ghostly apparitions. Filipe saves Black Dog, and when they are all transported back to their normal time and ship, Black Dog swears he will devote his life to Filipe.

Upon landing on Treasure Planet, Silver and his robots have a standoff with Smollett and Filipe over the map, which is interrupted by lava dragons sent by Flint's robot servant Nebuchadnezzar. After taking control of the Flint robot by performing "Va, pensiero" from the opera Nabucco, Silver kidnaps Filipe. Upon saving his cabin boy, Smollett and Filipe follow the map's instructions to find the treasure. Confronted by illusions, Filipe saves Commander Smollett from his self admitted weakness of beautiful women.

The duo melt the face of Captain Flint's ghost, revealing a sparkling container shaped like a jewel. Silver, who had followed them into the chamber, seals them in and takes the treasure. The commander and Filipe escape through a trap door, in time to see the Hispaniola fly away, leaving the duo, along with the parrot, marooned on Treasure Planet.

As the days go by, the trio prepare for the end of their lives; the commander refuses to speak, while the parrot runs low on batteries. Unexpectedly, the Hispaniola returns, under the control of Black Dog. Black Dog has overpowered Silver and his other robots, because Filipe is the only person who treated Black Dog as more than a tool. "You made me feel human, and I appreciate it." The group sets course for Earth, and Filipe explains in voice-over that the treasure was Flint's equivalent of Noah's Ark, containing samples of life on Earth before the world became too artificial.

The ship catches fire, caused by flying into a black hole. Silver, having sabotaged the navigation, shoots Commander Smollett, and is in turn killed by Filipe. The other robots, including the parrot and Black Dog are trapped under rubble. A dying Smollett tells Filipe to flee in the escape pod, but Filipe loads the treasure onto the pod and sends it towards Earth to restore nature. Filipe then goes down with the ship, into the black hole and subsequently an inescapable alien dimension described as a time vacuum of nothingness. The pod reaches earth, and melts the artificial components of the planet away to the tune of "Ode to Joy", played by the organisms, including a cameo by Mickey Mouse who will populate the planet as they drop from parachutes.

In epilogue, Filipe reveals that he is not condemned to the black hole for eternity and that every day he is reincarnated as a new being on Earth, one of which was a boy named Jim Hawkins.

== See also ==
- Treasure Island in Outer Space (Il Pianeta Del Tesoro or Treasure Planet), an Italian/German 1987 film.
- List of animated feature films of 1982
