= Rumen Petkov (artist) =

Bulgarian animator, painter and comic creator (1948–2018)

Rumen Petkov (Bulgarian: Румен Петков; 26 January 1948 – 11 June 2018) was a Bulgarian animator, painter and comic creator. He is best remembered for his animated series Choko the Stork and Boko the Frog, which he also adapted into a comic strip. His influence spawned a new generation of young Bulgarian comics artists, such as Vladimir Nedialkov, Koko Sarkisian, Ivan Kirjakov, Sten Damyanov, and others.

== Career ==
Petkov was one of the main artists of the comics' magazine Duga ("Rainbow"), which was the most popular comics magazine for several generations of Bulgarian children. His series The Adventures of Choko the Stork and Boko the Frog was popular in Bulgaria, during the 1970s and 1980s. Other famous animated films he directed are Friends of Gosho the Elephant, Treasure Planet, etc. He won the Grand Prize at the Ottawa Animation Festival and the Palme d'Or for Best Short at the 1985 Cannes Film Festival.

In the 1990s, Petkov worked as a writer, storyboard artist, animation director and director on some episodes of Johnny Bravo, Dexter's Laboratory, Cow and Chicken, I Am Weasel, The New Woody Woodpecker Show and other series. He said about animation: "Animation will never die because it's like music, because it's like running with the wind, because it's funny."

== Work ==
=== Theatrical animated films ===
- Treasure Planet (1982) (not to be confused with Disney's 2002 film)

=== Comics ===
- The Adventures of Choko the Stork and Boko the Frog

=== Animated television specials ===
- It's Flashbeagle, Charlie Brown (1984)–additional animator
- Happy New Year, Charlie Brown! (1986)–animator
- Snoopy: The Musical (1988)–animator
- Why, Charlie Brown, Why? (1990)–animator
- You're in the Super Bowl, Charlie Brown (1994)–animator
- It Was My Best Birthday Ever, Charlie Brown (1997)–animator
- Grandma Got Run Over by a Reindeer (2000)–sheet timer
- Tom and Jerry Blast Off to Mars! (2005)–animation and timing director
- Hey Arnold: The Jungle Movie! (2017)–animation director

=== Animated television series ===
- Aaahh!!! Real Monsters (1994–1997)
- Duckman (1994–1997)
- Dexter's Laboratory (1996–2003)
- Johnny Bravo (1997–2004)
- Cow and Chicken (1997–1999)
- I Am Weasel (1997–2000)
- Mike, Lu & Og (1999–2000)
- The New Woody Woodpecker Show (1999–2002)
