= One Million Monkeys Typing =

Defunct collaborative fiction website

- Homepage screenshot The site's homepage (2011)
- Website type: Collaborative writing
- Founded: 2007
- Dissolved: 2011
- Founders: Nina Zito; Ilya Kreymerman
- Revenue: ~$13 (2008)
- Website: 1000000monkeys.com (archived)
- Users: ~600 (2008)
- Current status: Offline
- Content license: Creative Commons Attribution-Noncommercial 3.0 License

One Million Monkeys Typing was a collaborative fiction website created by Nina Zito and Ilya Kreymerman that was active from 2007 until 2011. The platform allowed users to contribute story snippets between 50 and 300 words, and each snippet could have up to three branching snippets of its own.

Among the earliest online collaborative writing platforms, One Million Monkeys Typing subsequently attracted scholarly interest as a rare example of a web-based collaborative writing project that was multilinear; users contributed branching narratives to the site rather than the more typical linear style of online collaborative fiction in which users added to a single unitary story.

== History and operations ==
One Million Monkeys Typing was conceived of and built by Nina Zito, a web designer, and Ilya Kreymerman, a web developer. Zito and Kreymerman were discussing the notion of people writing new endings to classic works of literature, and they further developed the idea into One Million Monkeys Typing, on which entire stories were written by users. Zito said that the pair "imagined a never-ending, ever-improving text with strong branches reflecting the likes of the niche community that had shaped it—exactly the opposite of the 'absolute' nature of print". The site took its name from the infinite monkey theorem: that infinite monkeys producing infinite strings of random text will eventually reproduce any existing text, including classic works of literature.

One Million Monkeys Typing arose alongside several other early online collaborative fiction-writing platforms in the mid-2000s, including projects like A Million Penguins and sites such as Protagonize, Wattpad, and Ficly. Zito posted the site's first story in March 2007. As of July 2008 One Million Monkeys Typing had around 600 users and had earned Zito and Kreymerman "roughly $13" from banner ads in the preceding year. By mid-2011, the site had gone offline.

== Features and community ==
One Million Monkeys Typing allowed users (referred to as "monkeys") to collaboratively write stories in short snippets. Each new user-contributed story snippet—called a "trunk" in the site's tree-themed parlance—could be added to or "grafted" upon with up to three subsequent snippets. Story snippets varied in length, with maximum word counts between 50 and 300, and the site and its contents were distributed under a Creative Commons NonCommercial license. The site allowed users to rank and comment on snippets so that popular ones persisted and grew while unsuccessful paths would "wither and die". Beyond this, there was negligible editorial control over the site's branching stories.

The site's community was described by Isabell Klaiber, a scholar of literature, as "astonishingly harmonious". Comments posted on users' story snippets tended to be positive and supportive, with rarer negative feedback often couched among disclaimers. Both comments and snippets were attributed to identifiable members of the community, and Klaiber wrote that the site's more anonymous snippet-rating system of one to five stars ("bananas") was "a perhaps more honest expression of the users' opinion[s]". Disliked snippets tended to garner no comments or followup snippets of their own, rather than negative critiques from users.

Klaiber described One Million Monkeys Typing as a multilinear collaborative hyperfiction project. According to her, the active comment system for story snippets allowed for a cocreative relationship between site writers and site readers, the latter of whom contributed suggestions for possible paths stories could take. Klaiber described this as a "double plot", where readers were at once aware of the story told by the snippets (the main plot) and the interactions of the authors/commenters (the second plot) that influenced the main plot's direction. She described One Million Monkeys Typing and Protagonize as rare examples of multilinear online collaborative fiction authorship, where most other platforms encouraged more linear collaborative storytelling. The site promoted itself as akin to a branching Choose Your Own Adventure story and an exquisite corpse.

== Reception ==
In the Utne Reader, Brendan Mackie wrote that the site "merges the great thing about writers' workshops—being able to critique other people's writing—with the ability to cut off boring writers". Klaiber compared One Million Monkeys Typing with the 1908 novel The Whole Family which was written collaboratively by 12 authors and also featured what Klaiber described as a "double plot" in which the authors' disagreements were apparent to the reader. Alan Tapscott, Joaquim Colàs, and Josep Blat said that the site's "distinctive methodology led effectively to the creation of parallel story worlds, instead of expanding one". The scholar Johanna Drucker, meanwhile, wrote that the site's collaborative ethos was suggestive of "a primary school space of pseudo-egalitarian we-all-share-nicely mode", the product being "a fine combination of children's diversion and surrealistic activity".
