= Cow and Chicken =

American animated television series

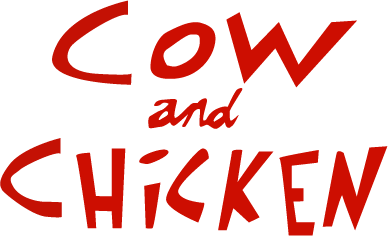
- Genre: Animated sitcom; Comedy; Surreal humour; Slapstick
- Created by: David Feiss
- Directed by: David Feiss
- Voices of: Charlie Adler; Candi Milo; Dee Bradley Baker; Howard Morris; Dan Castellaneta
- Theme music composer: Guy Moon
- Opening theme: "Cow and Chicken"
- Ending theme: "Cow and Chicken" (Instrumental)
- Composer: Guy Moon
- Country of origin: United States
- Original language: English
- No. of seasons: 4
- No. of episodes: 52 (Note: The series contains 104 unique segments.) (list of episodes)

Production
- Executive producers: Brian A. Miller; Sherry Gunther (Note: Seasons 1–2); Larry Huber; Buzz Potamkin (Note: Pilot)
- Producers: David Feiss; Vincent Davis
- Running time: 14 minutes
- Production company: Hanna-Barbera

Original release
- Network: Cartoon Network
- Release: July 15, 1997 – August 13, 1999

Related
- I Am Weasel; What a Cartoon!

Cow and Chicken is an American animated sitcom created by David Feiss for Cartoon Network. It is the third of the network's Cartoon Cartoons. It follows the surreal adventures of two talking animal siblings, Cow and Chicken. They’re often antagonized by the Red Guy, the Devil himself who poses as various characters to scam them.

The original pilot appeared as an episode of the animation showcase series What a Cartoon!. The popularity of the original short allowed Hanna-Barbera to give it the green light for a full series, which premiered on July 15, 1997. Originally, Cow and Chicken was attached to another segment called I Am Weasel, which was later spun off into its own half-hour series on June 10, 1999. These were the last Cartoon Network original series produced solely by Hanna-Barbera. It was nominated for two Emmy Awards.

== Premise ==
Chicken (left) and his younger sister Cow (right)

The series focuses on the misadventures of two unlikely yet somehow biological anthropomorphic animal siblings: the sweet-natured, dim, ditzy, naïve, and ecstatic 7-year-old Cow and her older 11-year-old brother, the hot-tempered, cynical, and sarcastic Chicken (both voiced by Charlie Adler). The two are often caught in escapades with their flamboyant enemy, the Red Guy (Adler), the Devil himself and who disguises himself under various personas, usually to either scam everyone around or just for fun. However, he once kidnapped Chicken and took him to Hell in the pilot. (Note: As depicted in the pilot No Smoking.)

Supporting characters include Chicken and Cow's delirious human parents Dad and Mom (Dee Bradley Baker and Candi Milo, respectively), only seen from the waist down and implied to have no torsos, heads, or arms; Chicken's best friends Flem (Howard Morris) and Earl (Dan Castellaneta); and their cousin, Boneless Chicken (Adler). Cow has her favorite dolls, Crabs the Warthog, Piles the Beaver, and Manure the Bear.

The series draws on eccentric, surreal, and bawdy humor. For example, Cow and Chicken always order "pork butts and taters" in the cafeteria, the Red Guy always shows his butt, and characters often pepper their speech with malapropisms and sarcasm. The humor and storylines depicted are usually based on traditional childhood worries, anxieties, or phobias such as cooties or venturing into the girls' restroom, but enhanced comically.

== Production ==
=== Development ===
David Feiss first created Cow and Chicken as a story for his daughter. Feiss was an animator who had worked with Hanna-Barbera and related projects since 1978.

Years later, Feiss was called to submit ideas for What a Cartoon!, a series of various animated shorts from numerous creators and writers, created by Hanna-Barbera president Fred Seibert. Feiss submitted three ideas to executive producer Larry Huber, one of which was Cow and Chicken. Cow and Chicken premiered on What a Cartoon! in 1995. Later, Hanna-Barbera decided to turn Cow and Chicken into a full series, following many letters from fans asking for more.

In a 2022 interview with Cartoon Brew, Feiss mentioned that he was told that Red Guy was no longer allowed to be referred to as the Devil after the series was greenlit — leading to the character being portrayed "as a generic Red Guy".

=== Voice actors ===
A single actor, Charlie Adler, voiced the three leading roles of Cow, Chicken, and the Red Guy. Supporting voices included Candi Milo and Dee Bradley Baker as Mom and Dad, and Dan Castellaneta and Howard Morris as Earl and Flem.

Guest stars included Feiss, Will Ferrell, Carlos Alazraqui, Tom Kenny, Jill Talley, Dom DeLuise, Michael Gough, Mark Hamill, Maurice LaMarche, Rob Paulsen, Lori Alan, Jess Harnell, Jeff Bennett, Jim Belushi, Pamela Adlon, Tom Kane and many others.

== Episodes ==
Season	Episodes	Originally released	
Season	Episodes	First released	Last released
Pilot		November 12, 1995	
1	13	July 15, 1997	October 7, 1997
2	13	January 13, 1998	April 7, 1998
3	13	September 1, 1998	May 3, 1999
4	13	April 26, 1999	August 13, 1999

Cow and Chicken has a total of 52 episodes in 4 seasons that were produced from July 1997 to July 1999. Each half-hour contains 2 Cow and Chicken segments and 1 I Am Weasel segment. Cow and Chicken premiered as a full half-hour on July 15, 1997. The series ran for 52 episodes through 1999. As a supporting segment, the show included a cartoon called I Am Weasel; this segment was spun off as an independent series that premiered on June 10, 1999. Typically, an episode would consist of two seven-minute Cow and Chicken shorts playing back-to-back, then followed by a seven-minute I Am Weasel short before the end credits. The exception to this structure was episode 105 ("The Ugliest Weenie"), which had the Weasel short ("I Are Big Star") play in-between the two Cow and Chicken shorts, possibly because said shorts were one storyline.

=== Controversy ===
The second season segment "Buffalo Gals", first paired with "Cow and Chicken Reclining", was banned by Cartoon Network after they received one letter of complaint from a parent about the episode's visual and verbal innuendo about the titular biker group being lesbians. In the segment, the Buffalo Gals break into people's homes to chew on the carpet, a biker named Munch Kelly has a carpet swatch for a calling card, and when Dad freaks out over the Buffalo Gals in the house, Mom says, "They're not after you." In addition, the Buffalo Gals play softball and talk about pitching and catching.

"Buffalo Gals" only aired once on June 27, 1998, and was replaced with "Orthodontic Police" in future airings, including on Netflix streaming and reruns on Boomerang. The episode was also discussed on an installment of Rob Paulsen's Talkin' Toons special featuring Cow and Chicken creator David Feiss and voice actor Charlie Adler when an audience member asked why "Buffalo Gals" only aired once.

== Reception ==
KJ Dell'Antonia of Common Sense Media gave the show three stars out of five, describing it as "if Ren & Stimpy starred in Monty Python..."

=== Awards and nominations ===
Year	Award	Category	Nominee(s)	Result
1996	Annie Award	Best Animated Short Subject	Hanna-Barbera; for "No Smoking"	Won
1996	Primetime Emmy Award	Outstanding Animated Program (For Programming One Hour or Less)	Buzz Potamkin, Larry Huber, David Feiss, Pilar Menendez, and Sam Kieth; for "No Smoking"	Nominated
1997	Annie Award	Best Individual Achievement: Storyboarding in a TV Production	Nora Johnson; for "Orthodontic Police"	Won
1998	Annie Award	Outstanding Individual Achievement for Music in an Animated Television Production	Bill Burnett and Guy Moon; for "The Ugliest Weenie, Part 2"	Nominated
1998	Annie Award	Outstanding Individual Achievement for Producing in an Animated Television Production	Vincent Davis	Won
1998	Annie Award	Outstanding Individual Achievement for Storyboarding in an Animated Television Production	Maxwell Atoms; for "The Karate Chick"	Nominated
1998	Golden Reel Award	Best Sound Editing — Sound Effects	Greg LaPlante	Nominated
1998	Golden Reel Award	Best Sound Editing — Television Animated Series	Cartoon Network	Nominated
1998	Golden Reel Award	Best Sound Editing — Television Animation — Music	Cartoon Network	Nominated
1998	Primetime Emmy Award	Outstanding Animated Program (For Programming One Hour or Less)	Davis Doi, Vincent Davis, David Feiss, Steve Marmel, Richard Pursel, and Michael Ryan; for "Free Inside!/Journey to the Center of Cow"	Nominated
1999	Annie Award	Outstanding Individual Achievement for Voice Acting in an Animated Television Production	Charlie Adler; as Cow	Nominated
1999	Golden Reel Award	Best Sound Editing — Television Animated Series — Sound	Cartoon Network	Nominated
1999	Golden Reel Award	Best Sound Editing — Television Animation — Music	Cartoon Network	Nominated

== Home media ==
Cow and Chicken: Season 1, a two-disc set featuring the complete first season which contains 13 complete episodes, was released by Madman Entertainment in Australia (Region 4 PAL) on September 12, 2007. Season 2 came out on February 10, 2010, by the same company in Australia. The entire series got partially released on DVD in Thailand as 4 season sets, containing Thai and English audio, with the segment "Buffalo Gals" banned from these releases.

The video game Cartoon Network Racing contains the episodes "Black Sheep of the Family" and "Child Star" (PS2 version only) as unlockable extras.

All 4 seasons were released on iTunes and Amazon as of August 16, 2018.

Title	Format	Format	Country	Distributor	Release date	Ref.
Cartoon Cartoons: Cow and Chicken	VHS	NTSC	United States	Cartoon Network	1998	
Cow and Chicken: Volume 1	VHS	PAL	United Kingdom	Warner Home Video (UK)	—N/a	
Cow and Chicken: Who Is Super Cow?	VHS	PAL	Australia	Warner Home Video (Australia)	—N/a	
Cow and Chicken: Season 1	DVD	PAL	Australia	Madman Entertainment	September 12, 2007	
Cow and Chicken: Season 2	DVD	PAL	Australia	Madman Entertainment	February 10, 2010	

American releases

- Cartoon Network Halloween - 9 Creepy Capers: "Cow with Four Eyes" (August 10, 2004)
- Cartoon Network Christmas - Yuletide Follies: "Me an' My Dog" (October 5, 2004)

=== Promotions ===
Taco Bell promoted the series with a licensed kids meal featuring five toys from Cow and Chicken at 4200 restaurants beginning in February 1999.

=== Video games ===
Cow, Chicken, and the Red Guy are playable characters in the 2006 racing game Cartoon Network Racing, which released on the PlayStation 2 and Nintendo DS. The PlayStation 2 version includes Flem and Earl as playable characters.

Cow/Supercow, Chicken, and the Red Guy are playable characters in the kart racing video game Cartoon Network Speedway, which released on the Game Boy Advance in North America on November 17, 2004.

Cow and Chicken are playable characters and other characters cameo from the show in the party video game Cartoon Network: Block Party, which released on the Game Boy Advance in North America on August 5, 2004.

Cow and Chicken: Super Cow Adventure platform java game developed by Cobra Mobile was released on mobile devices on 2007. The Red Guy kidnaps Chicken and Cow must save him and defeat The Red Guy. The game contains 21 levels and 1 mini game.

In the online video game FusionFall, one of the character items is based on Cow and Chicken. Cow and Chicken's cousin, Boneless Chicken, can also be seen on a billboard in the game. Though not in the game, Cow is seen as Supercow as a statue at Mt. Neverest.

== See also ==
- I Am Weasel
- Cartoon Cartoons
- List of works produced by Hanna-Barbera
- The Shnookums and Meat Funny Cartoon Show
- The Ren & Stimpy Show
- 2 Stupid Dogs
