= I Am Weasel =

American animated television series

- Genre: Animated sitcom; Comedy; Slapstick; Surreal humor
- Created by: David Feiss
- Written by: Michael Ryan; Steve Marmel
- Story by: David Feiss; Maxwell Atoms; Michael Ryan; Nora Johnson; Richard Pursel; Steve Marmel
- Directed by: David Feiss; Robin Steele (Note: 12 episodes); Robert Alvarez (Note: 1 episode)
- Voices of: Michael Dorn; Charlie Adler; Dee Bradley Baker
- Theme music composer: Bill Fulton (Note: Melody); Richard Pursel (Note: Lyrics)
- Opening theme: "I Am Weasel", performed by April March (parody of the children's song Pop Goes the Weasel)
- Ending theme: "I Am Weasel" (instrumental)
- Composer: Bill Fulton
- Country of origin: United States
- Original language: English
- No. of seasons: 5
- No. of episodes: 79 (list of episodes)

Production
- Executive producers: Brian A. Miller; Larry Huber (Note: Season 1); Sherry Gunther (Note: Seasons 1–2)
- Producers: David Feiss; Vincent Davis; Davis Doi (Note: Supervising producer, seasons 2–3)
- Running time: 7 minutes
- Production company: Hanna-Barbera

Original release
- Network: Cartoon Network
- Release: July 22, 1997 – 2000

Related
- Cow and Chicken

I Am Weasel is an American animated sitcom created by David Feiss for Cartoon Network. It is the fourth of the network's Cartoon Cartoons and the final to be produced solely by Hanna-Barbera. The series centers on I.M. Weasel (voiced by Michael Dorn), a smart, noble and successful weasel, I.R. Baboon (voiced by Charlie Adler), an idiotic and arrogant baboon who is envious of Weasel and acts as both his rival and friend, and the mischievous, flamboyant Red Guy (also voiced by Adler), who returns from Cow and Chicken to antagonize the duo.

I Am Weasel originally aired as a segment of Cow and Chicken from 1997 to 1999, often airing as the third of three segments in an episode, and eventually became a spin off into its own series. A fifth season with 27 new episodes aired from June 10, 1999, to 2000 and joined the original 52 which were previously part of Cow and Chicken. The entire series includes 79 episodes overall.

== Premise ==
The series chronicles the random adventures of two animal frenemies: I.M. Weasel (Michael Dorn) and I.R. Baboon (Charlie Adler). The first one is a famous, heroic, eloquent, highly intelligent and very talented least weasel who always tries to help people out and is thus adored by everybody, constantly shouting his catchphrase "I am Weasel!" while pointing high in the air before going after help. The latter is his foil, an ugly and idiotic baboon who is envious of Weasel's success and constantly tries to do better than he does (also doing a victory dance to express his joy when thinking he is doing so), and failing miserably after all due to his total stupidity.

Starting from season two, the Red Guy (Charlie Adler), a main character in Cow and Chicken, also gets that role in I Am Weasel, where he is also referred to as "I.B. Red Guy", an allusion to Weasel's and Baboon's names. His addition to the series makes him gradually take the role of villain from I.R., who becomes more friendly to Weasel, despite still despising him.

As the series progresses, I.M. Weasel, initially showed as a competent protagonist, gradually loses the focus to I.R. Baboon, because people are shown to get gradually dumber, sometimes being manipulated by the Red Guy into stupidity. In the series finale, I.R. is finally presented as the true star of the show instead of him.

Supporting characters include Loulabelle (Susanne Blakeslee, Teresa Ganzel), Jolly Roger (Dee Bradley Baker) and Admiral Bullets (Jess Harnell, Michael Gough). Many characters from Cow and Chicken make cameo appearances in I Am Weasel from season two, these include: Cow, Chicken (Charlie Adler), Mom, Teacher (Candi Milo), Dad (Dee Bradley Baker), Flem (Howard Morris), and Earl (Dan Castellaneta).

=== Universe setting ===
While season one does not reference Cow and Chicken, from season two, I Am Weasel usually takes place in the same universe of that show, due to Red Guy's presence and other characters from that show making occasional cameos. David Feiss, in fact, cross-populated both series as it made the work easier and he felt it was always the same universe. Despite so, I Am Weasel is occasionally presented as a TV show airing in the Cow and Chicken world, suggesting a separate continuity. The same occurs in another episode, but with the characters in the same universe.

=== Characters ===
The central characters: I.M. Weasel (right) and I.R. Baboon (left).

- I.M. Weasel (Michael Dorn): A highly intelligent, skilled and famous weasel who mostly plays a straight man role in a world full of idiots. While very helpful and beloved at the beginning of the series, he eventually starts to show frustration with people's antics and his "hero" status towards them becomes more fallible.
- I.R. Baboon (Charlie Adler): A dimwitted and jealous baboon, he eventually becomes Weasel's best friend. Shown in the beginning as trying to persuade people's attention from Weasel, always failing miserably and being hated, he eventually gets a "hero" status as the world becomes just as stupid as him. He is known for his habit of going into a rage if people laugh at his buttocks. Always wears a white t-shirt with an upside-down "I.R." written by himself on it.
- The Red Guy (Charlie Adler): Also cited as "I.B. Red Guy", he is a comical representation of the Devil. He reprises his role from Cow and Chicken, trying to persuade and scam the central characters under various disguises. He may sometimes play as a third main character.
- Jolly Roger (Dee Bradley Baker): A fat and tall man who always wears a tuxedo along a sailor costume, named after the pirate flag. He makes a brief appearance in the middle of season 3 before becoming a recurring character for the show in season 5.
- Loulabelle (Susanne Blakeslee / Teresa Ganzel): A gorgeous assistant woman to Weasel, a blonde nurse. Also shown as laboratory assistant in two episodes. Loulabelle is implied as Weasel's girlfriend in season 2. Her appearance is downsized to a one-time character in season 3.
- Admiral Bullets (Jess Harnell / Michael Gough): A short-sized admiral always seen standing up over a small bench. He appears mostly in the early seasons calling up for Weasel's help. He was last seen in a later episode of season 3, where he is given a darker skin tone and is seen piloting a jet in a war.

== Development and production ==
=== Creation and concept ===
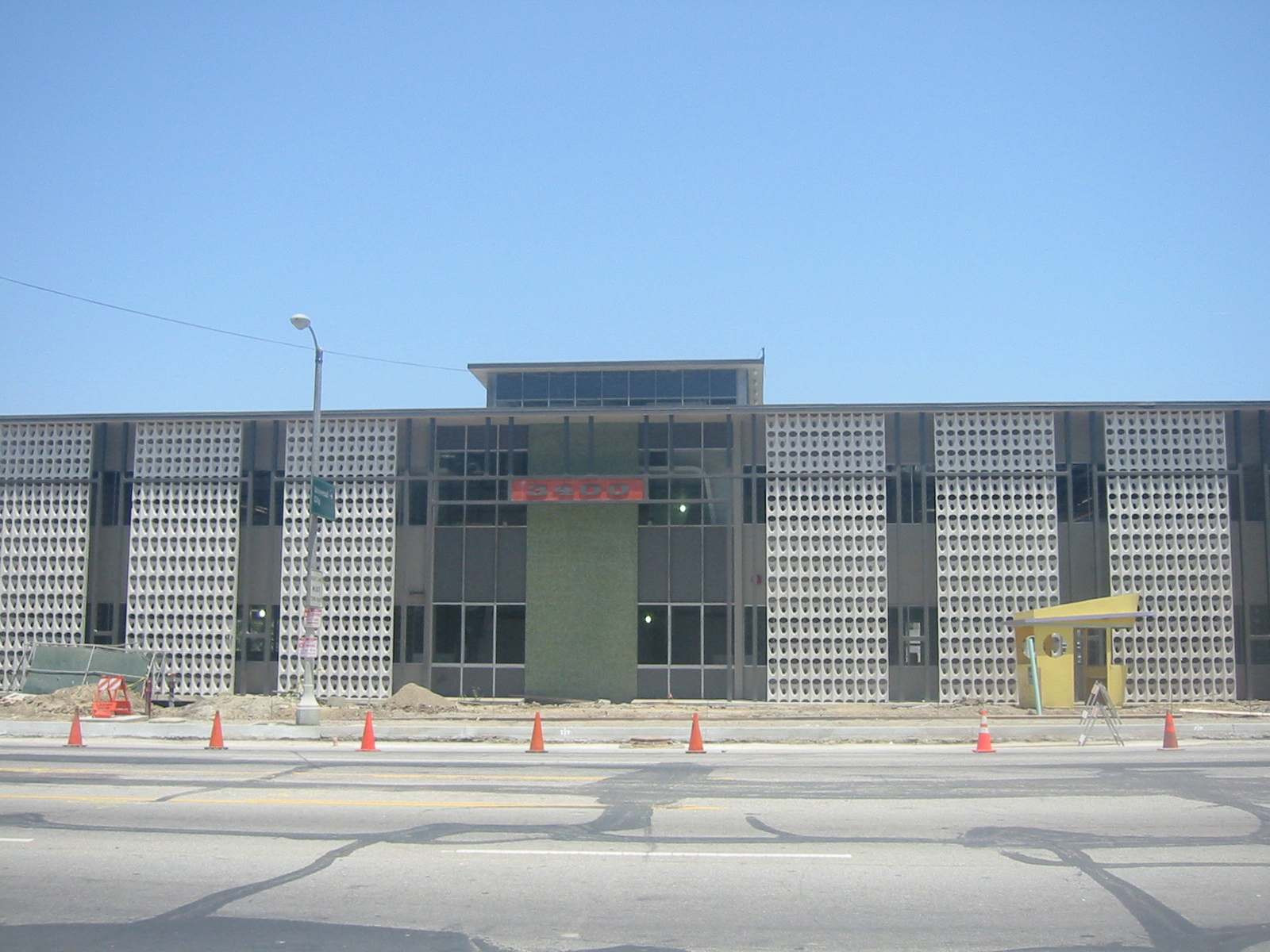
Former Hanna-Barbera studio building, in Los Angeles, seen here in 2007.

Cow and Chicken started out as the pilot episode "No Smoking" on What a Cartoon! in 1995, and was greenlit to become a series. Cartoon Network demanded a second cartoon to join Cow and Chicken in its half-hour time slot, so David Feiss came up with I Am Weasel, loosely based upon the novel I Am Legend, one of his favorite books as a teenager. "I was doodling one day, and drew a weasel, with the title 'I Am Weasel', off of one of my favorite books as a teenager, Richard Matheson's I Am Legend. I thought against type, that instead of a weasel who was a weasel, this guy would be smart and heroic".

According to Feiss, the idea for creating the show began as a single drawing of I.M. Weasel with the caption "I Am Weasel" and that suggested many stories to him. The concept for the rivalry between a weasel and a baboon came up from the classic nursery rhyme "Pop Goes the Weasel", where a monkey is said to be chasing a weasel. Also, the fact that the Red Guy does not wear pants was controversial for many people, as he said: "The thing that I never thought that I'd get approval for was the Red Guy. The mere fact that he didn't wear pants was a challenge for a lot of people and I am glad Cartoon Network let it go - he's my favorite character".

Production began around April 1996 and the show was inserted as a series of segments in Cow and Chicken until mid-1999. Right after the end of that show, it was spun-off into a new separated series produced until September 16, 1999, with all the previous episodes incorporated and removed from Cow and Chicken.

General production took place at the studio of Hanna-Barbera, in Los Angeles, with the series being labeled as part of both the collection of cartoons of that company and Cartoon Network's Cartoon Cartoons. Animation production was done overseas by Rough Draft Korea, in Seoul.

=== Retooling ===
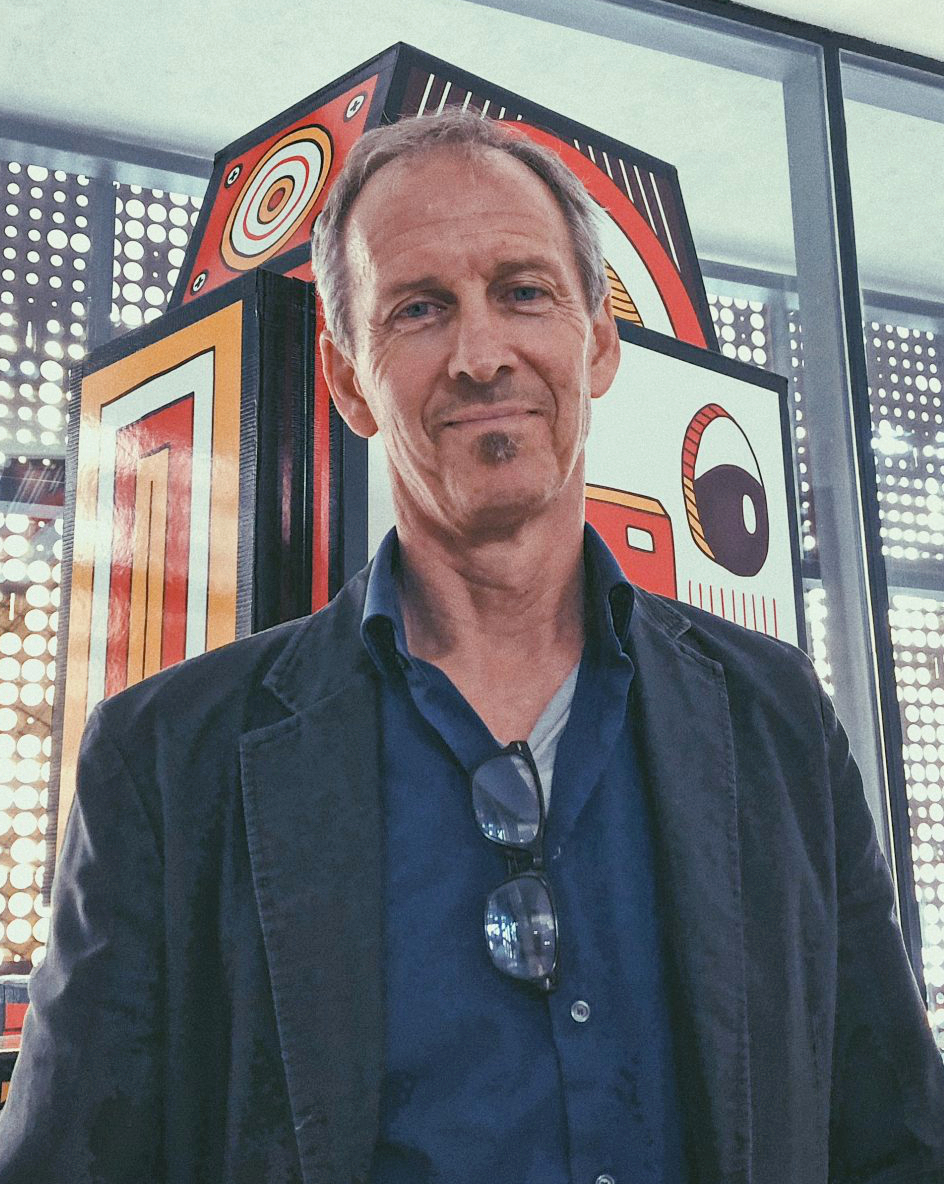
Series creator David Feiss in 2018.

From season two onward, the show's story, recurring characters and art style underwent significant changes. I.R. Baboon went on to become gradually more friendly to Weasel and less seen as antagonist, as that role was taken over by the Red Guy. Supporting characters from seasons one to three, such as Loulabelle and Admiral Bullets, became less and less seen, completely being absent in seasons four and five. Many characters from Cow and Chicken were added as supporting or recurring characters. That was explained by Feiss: "There was a lot of pressure to complete Cow and Chicken quickly, and I felt that I couldn't dedicate enough time to the second show. But Cartoon Network wanted to spin off Weasel, so we did. I don't really remember asking if I could or could not cross populate the two shows--I just did it because it felt like the same universe, plus I thought it was funny to have the Red Guy in I Am Weasel".

The story started to show more of Weasel's shortcomings and at times allowed him to lapse into a wise fool, suffering similar gags as I.R., as opposed of the invincible folk hero role he played on season one. I.R. Baboon started to become more like a hero than a villain, also taking that role from Weasel in some episodes of season five, leading to the finale. The show never truly dropped its premise of Weasel serving to contrast Baboon's stupidity and failures (the very thing that allowed Baboon to usurp him in the final episode as the key piece of the entertainment) and that Weasel retained more than enough intelligence and morality to serve as his defining characteristics, among the cast.

The exact same art style of Cow and Chicken is used starting from season two. Season one is a bit different, including the title cards for episodes, which feature animation and Weasel saying the name of the episode with additional commentary and/or events, contrasting with the style also used for Cow and Chicken, with static image.

=== Humor style ===
Humor relies on slapstick comedy and moderate off-color humor, as typical of many 1990s cartoons, and is based on the existent gap between the central characters, with I.R. Baboon being the center of most running gags, which are mostly about his stupidity and big red buttocks, though some episodes show I.M. Weasel or the Red Guy also taking this role. Butt jokes are also more frequent when the Red Guy is around and parodies of popular culture and other shows and crossovers also take place in some episodes.

Season one shows Weasel as a "perfect" character without a single display of any character flaw, and Baboon as a buffoonish idiot. Weasel gradually becomes less intelligent and competent alongside the audience, allowing I.R. to take his place as the "star" of the show. From season two onward, the Red Guy incorporates the style of humor found in Cow and Chicken, taking the role of villain, but also appearing as a third wheel. In season five, Jolly Roger also starts to fill both roles.

Episodes usually reference the show name and I.M. Weasel with titles in first person, and a great number of them also make fun of I.R. Baboon's misspelling, with grammatically incorrect names such as "I Are Big Star", "I Are Good Salesmans" and "I Are a Artiste".

The fourth wall is often broken, mostly at the end of episodes. The characters do it to make some ending commentaries, give advice to spectators or just call for the end of the episode.

=== Title, credits and music ===
The title sequence features I.M. Weasel constantly saying his catchphrase "I am Weasel!" and I.R. Baboon doing his trademarked victory dance. The series ending credits were only created in 1999, with the separation; it credits all involved in the three years of production and the theme song is played instrumentally in a pop rock style, with additional arrangement like orchestrations.

The theme song was composed by Bill Fulton, written by Richard Pursel, and sung by April March. Musically, it is a humorous take on the well-known version of "Pop Goes the Weasel".

=== Voice cast ===
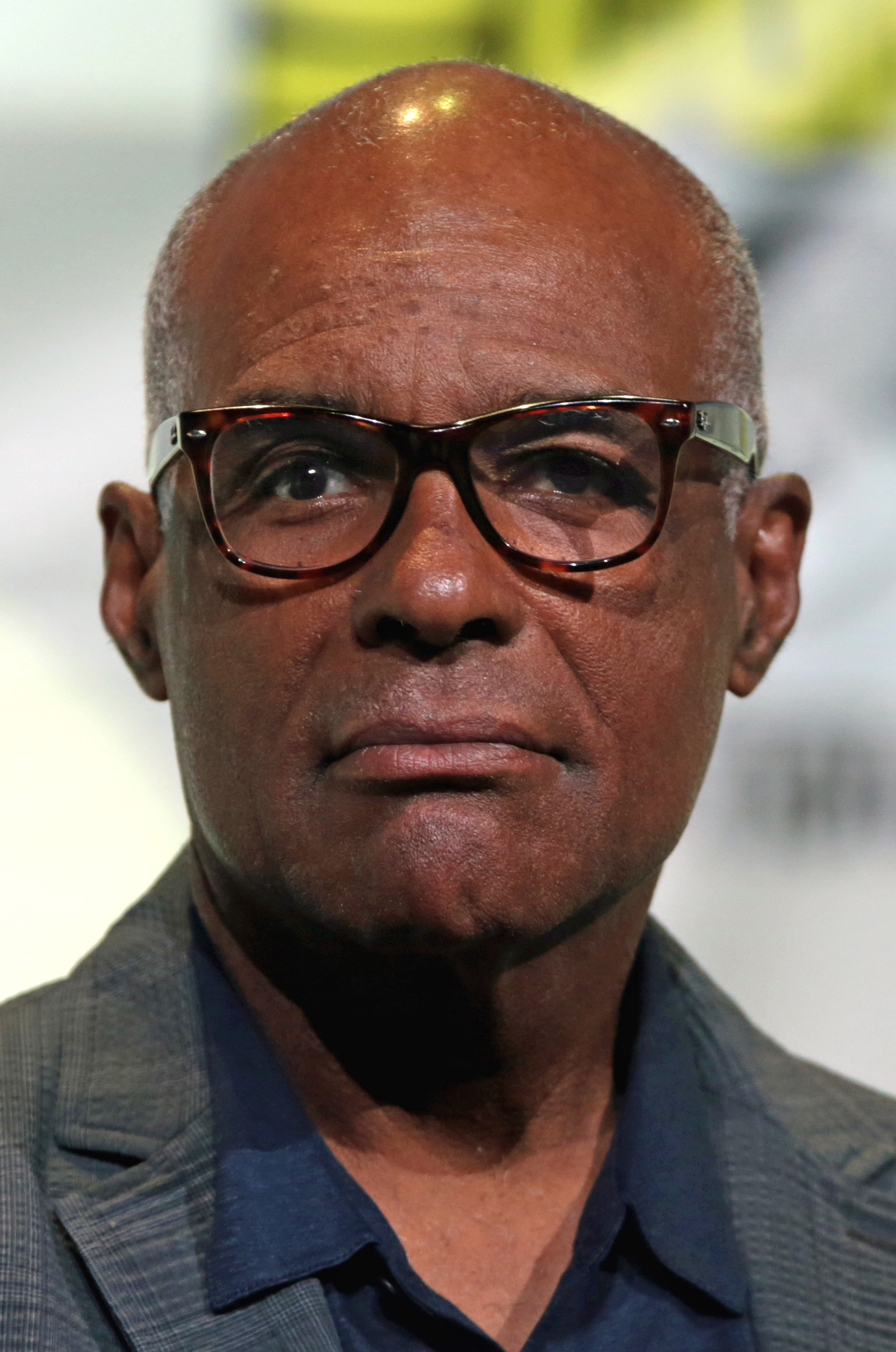
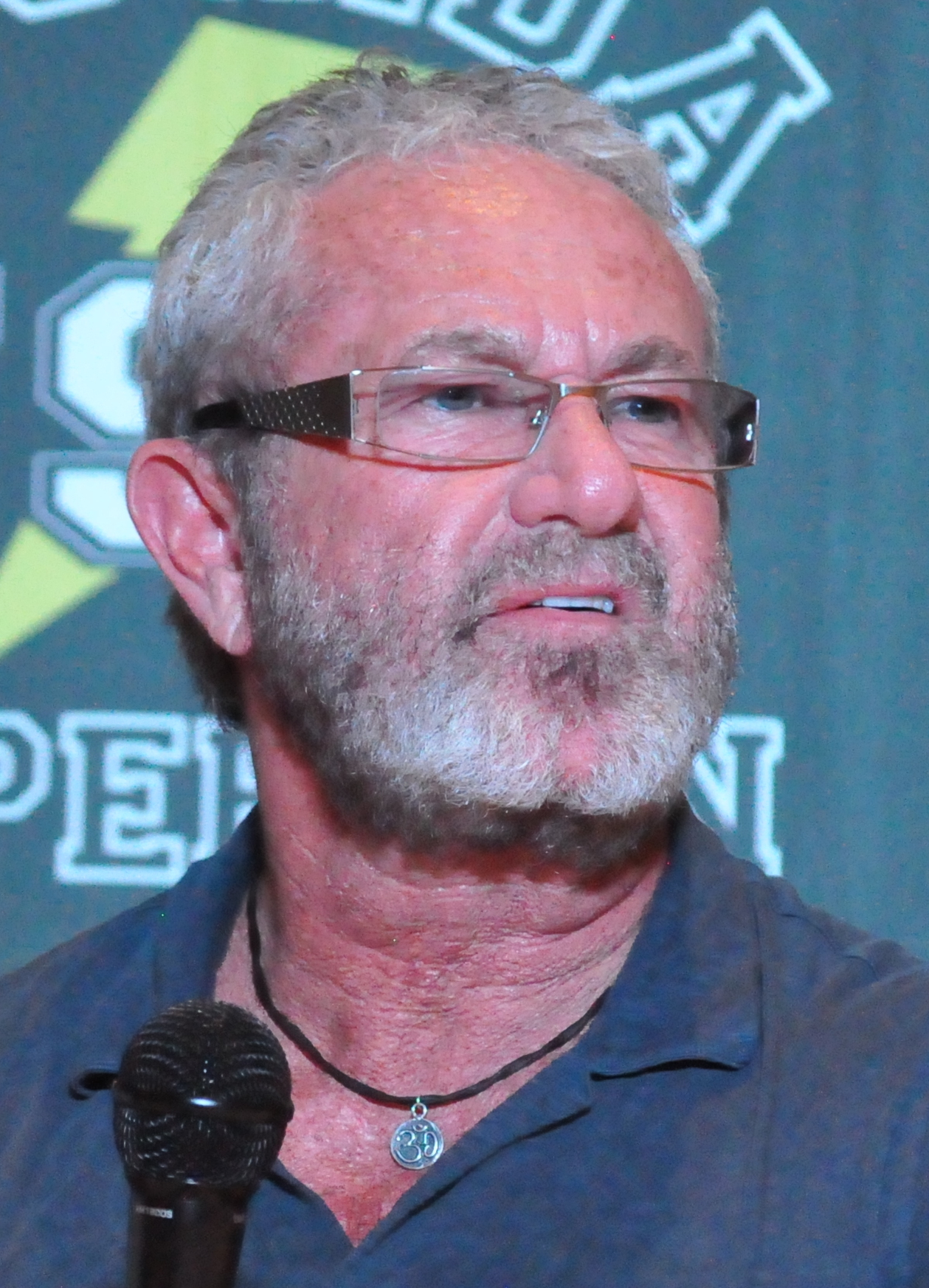
Michael Dorn (left) and Charlie Adler (right), who provided voices for the three main characters.

Michael Dorn provided voice for I.M. Weasel and Charlie Adler did both voices of I.R. Baboon and the Red Guy. Loulabelle was voiced by Susanne Blakeslee in season two and Teresa Ganzel in season three, Jolly Roger by Dee Bradley Baker, and Admiral Bullets by Jess Harnell in season one and Michael Gough in season two. Feiss originally considered James Earl Jones for the role of I.M. Weasel since he was the announcer of Cartoon Network's sister channel CNN, but Dorn was recommended to him by his friend and Johnny Bravo creator Van Partible.

Additional characters were voiced by the aforementioned along with Carlos Alazraqui, Dan Castellaneta, Dom DeLuise, Tom Kenny, Candi Milo, Howard Morris and Frank Welker, among others.

Guest stars include Phyllis Diller, Mark Hamill, Ed McMahon, Laraine Newman, Jeremy Piven, George Segal, Susan Tyrell and Mary Woronov.

== Broadcast ==
=== Broadcast history ===
A sneak peek for the series was aired on July 15, 1997, with the eleventh episode, "Law of Gravity", and then it started its original run from July 22, 1997 with the second episode, "I.R. on Sun", all yet as a series of segments on Cow and Chicken. After four seasons, it was separated and premiered as a half-hour show on June 10, 1999, and the 52 episodes originally aired on Cow and Chicken began to air on the show's own time slot, being either in or outside the Cartoon Cartoon Fridays programming block, and getting joined by 27 new episodes, totaling 79. The original run ended in early 2000.

Reruns aired prominently from early 2000 to 2002, including on Cartoon Cartoon Fridays. From September 2005 to June 2006, it returned sporadically as segments on The Cartoon Cartoon Show, along with other Cartoon Cartoons from that era. On April 13, 2012, the series returned on Cartoon Planet before being removed in 2013. It was also aired on Boomerang, but only with seasons 1 to 4 along the Cow and Chicken segments, and on Cartoon Network Too in the United Kingdom. Some episodes were also made available on Cartoon Network Video in the early 2010s. From June 25, 2017, season one was made available on Netflix in Australia, along Cow and Chicken. It started to be available worldwide on HBO Max from 2022 onward.

The show is rated TV-Y7 in the United States, and G (General) in both Australia and New Zealand.

==== Brazilian miniseries ====
In Brazil, an animated miniseries named Terra à Vista ("Land in Sight") was produced in 2000 for Cartoon Network, and tells the story of the Portuguese arriving at Brazil with a humorous take, using characters from Cartoon Cartoons, including I.M. Weasel, I.R. Baboon and the Red Guy. It was broadcast on Cartoon Network Brazil from March 6 to April 22, 2000, and has 8 episodes. This series was also the first-ever Cartoon Network production exclusively made for Brazil.

=== Episodes ===
The series consists of five seasons and 79 episodes. The first four seasons contain the segments that originally aired during broadcasts of Cow and Chicken, while the fifth contains a further 27 episodes produced independently of that show. They were all eventually mend up into the whole I Am Weasel series, although they still air sometimes within Cow and Chicken timeslots.

There was a small case of censorship in the episode "I.R. Mommy", in which the letter "N", present on an American football helmet used by I.R. Baboon (a reference to the Nebraska Cornhuskers), had to be digitally removed in 1999 after Cartoon Network was sued by the University of Nebraska, who alleged the reference was derogatory for their institution. No other episode suffered censorship so far.

Season	Episodes	Originally released	
Season	Episodes	First released	Last released
1	13	July 22, 1997	December 16, 1997
2	13	January 13, 1998	April 7, 1998
3	13	August 1998	November 1998
4	13	January 1999	April 1999
5	27	June 10, 1999	2000

=== Ratings ===
It became one of the most successful Cartoon Network original series of its time, usually being remembered along other major Cartoon Cartoons and recording high ratings for the network in both incarnations of season one and seasons two to five.

In 1997 and 1998, I Am Weasel along Cow and Chicken, Johnny Bravo and Dexter's Laboratory, were responsible for increasing Cartoon Network's average ratings.

The premiere of season five on June 10, 1999, reached 1.8 million viewers in households, acquiring 4.4 with kids 2-11 and 4.6 with kids 6-11. It was also the fifth most watched show on Cartoon Network in 2000, with an average rating of 1.8 million viewers, only and not far behind The Powerpuff Girls (1.9), Tom and Jerry (2.0), Courage the Cowardly Dog (2.1) and Dexter's Laboratory (2.3).

== Merchandise ==
=== Home media ===
Both VHS and DVD releases have been produced for the series. Although no official media containing complete seasons has been released in the United States as of 2022, a Cartoon Cartoons VHS from 1998 dedicated to the show contains the episodes "My Friend, the Smart Banana", "I.R. Pixie Fairie" and "I.R. in Wrong Cartoon", and a Cartoon Cartoon Fridays VHS in 1999 includes episodes alongside other series. Cartoon Network has released special Halloween and Christmas holiday DVDs in 2004 and 2005, distributed by Warner Home Video, containing one or two episodes. In the United Kingdom, a compilation DVD of Cartoon Network shows containing one episode of the series was released.

In Thailand, volumes have been released on DVD since 2009 by MVD Company; a single-disc volume titled Season One with a runtime of 99 minutes was released on December 23, 2009. In Australia and New Zealand, a two-disc Collection 1 DVD was launched in 2011, distributed by Madman Entertainment.

I Am Weasel-only home media releases (Note: Only official seasons releases are listed here, excluding all the ones made by third-party companies.)
Title	Format	Region	Country	Runtime	Distributor	Release date	Ref.
Cartoon Cartoons: I Am Weasel	VHS	—N/a	United States	28 min	Cartoon Network	1998	
I Am Weasel - Season 1 / ข้าคือวีเซิล - ภาค 1	DVD	3	Thailand	99 min	MVD Company	December 23, 2009	
I Am Weasel - Collection 1	DVD	4	Australia	198 min	Madman Entertainment	July 6, 2011	
I Am Weasel - Collection 1	DVD	4	New Zealand	198 min	Madman Entertainment	August 11, 2011	

Collective media containing I Am Weasel episodes (Note: Only compilation media made by Cartoon Network are listed here, excluding all the ones made by third-party companies.)
Title	Format	Region	Country	Episodes	Distributor	Release date	Ref.
Cartoon Cartoon Fridays	VHS	—N/a	United States	"My Friend, the Smart Banana"	Cartoon Network	1999	
Cartoon Network Halloween: 9 Creepy Cartoon Capers	DVD	1	United States	"I Am Vampire"	Warner Home Video	August 10, 2004	
Cartoon Network Halloween 2: Grossest Halloween Ever	DVD	1	United States	"Power of Odor"	Warner Home Video	August 9, 2005	
Cartoon Network Christmas: Yuletide Follies	DVD	1	United States	"I.R.'s First Bike"	Warner Home Video	October 5, 2004	
Cartoon Network Christmas: Yuletide Follies	DVD	1	United States	"Dessert Island"	Warner Home Video	October 5, 2004	
Cartoon Network Christmas 2: Christmas Rocks	DVD	1	United States	"Happy Baboon Holidays"	Warner Home Video	October 4, 2005	
Cartoon Network: Toon Foolery - Laugh Your 'Ed Off!	DVD	2	United Kingdom	"I.R. in Wrong Cartoon"	Cartoon Network	—N/a	

=== Audio ===
The show also has two audio tracks featured in Cartoon Medley, a compilation album made by Kid Rhino for Cartoon Network, containing tracks from many animated series from the network and others. It was released on July 6, 1999, in CD and cassette releases, and contains the show's audio tracks "I Am Weasel", which is the theme song, and "I.M. Weasel's Poem", an oral text spoken by I.M. Weasel.

=== Comics ===
From 1999 to 2005, I Am Weasel had stories featured on three collective comic series published by DC Comics: Cartoon Network Starring (1999–2000), Cartoon Cartoons (2001–2004; having lead stories on issues #5 and #19) and Cartoon Network Block Party! (2004–2009). It was presented along stories from many Cartoon Network original series, such as Dexter's Laboratory, Johnny Bravo, Cow and Chicken, Ed, Edd n Eddy, Courage the Cowardly Dog, The Grim Adventures of Billy & Mandy, Sheep in the Big City, among others. The characters also appeared in the crossover comic series The Powerpuff Girls: Super Smash-Up!.

Stories from Cartoon Network Starring comics
Stories	Issue	Release date
"Komic Kon"	#3	September 29, 1999
"A Clone Again, Naturally"	#7	January 19, 2000
"Baboon in Love"	#10	April 19, 2000
"Night of the Baboon"	#13	July 19, 2000
"A Farewell to Weasel"	#16	October 18, 2000

Stories from Cartoon Network Block Party! comics
Stories	Issue	Release date
"Double-Decker Hero"	#3	November 24, 2004
"Hairlocks and the Three Weasels"	#5	January 26, 2005
"X Marks the Baboon"	#7	March 23, 2005
"Bubble Trouble"	#10	June 29, 2005

Stories from Cartoon Cartoons comics
Stories	Issue	Release date
"Who Are Baboon?"	#1	January 27, 2001
"The Test of a Baboon"	#4	April 18, 2001
"Water on the Brain"	#5	May 23, 2001
"I.R. Smelly"	#9	January 30, 2002
"Theory-Go-Round"	#9	January 30, 2002
"Around the World in 80!"	#12	July 24, 2002
"Inca Dinka Doo"	#16	March 26, 2003
"There's No Place Like Rome"	#19	June 25, 2003
"What's Cooking?"	#23	October 29, 2003
"Double-O Zero"	#26	January 28, 2004
"Walk a Mile in My Glutes"	#29	April 28, 2004
"The Perfect Swivel"	#33	August 25, 2004

=== Games ===
An I Am Weasel-themed checkers set was part of a promotion made by Cartoon Network in the late 1990s/early 2000s.

On the kart racing video game, Cartoon Network Racing, available for PlayStation 2 and Nintendo DS, I.M. Weasel is a playable character, while I.R. Baboon and the Red Guy must be unlocked to play with, but the first is available in the DS version only. Also, only in the PS2 version, the episodes "Enemy Camp" and "My Friend, the Smart Banana" are available as extras which can be unlocked by winning the "UR Challenged Cup" and "I.M. Weasel Super Tournament" modes, respectively.

In the MMO game, Cartoon Network Universe: FusionFall, there was an item named "I.R. Baboon shorts", which were player-wearable shorts based upon I.R. Baboon's buttocks.

Six Flash and Shockwave games of the series were also available on Cartoon Network website during the 1990s and 2000s:

- Beat the Heat
- The World Has Gone Bananas
- Block that Baboon!
- Bop the Weasel
- Cerebral Challenge
- Foosball

== See also ==
- Cow and Chicken
- Cartoon Cartoons
- List of fictional animals
- List of works produced by Hanna-Barbera Productions
