= List of Lizzie McGuire episodes =

The following is a list of episodes of Lizzie McGuire, a television comedy series created by Terri Minsky for Disney Channel. It aired from January 12, 2001, to February 14, 2004. The show was produced by Stan Rogow. The show's target demographic was preteens and teenagers, and it was a ratings hit, drawing in 2.3 million viewers per episode. It aired for 65 episodes. The success of the television series led Disney Channel to produce a feature film spin-off based on the show, titled The Lizzie McGuire Movie. In 2019, it was announced that Lizzie McGuire would return on Disney+, with Hilary Duff, Hallie Todd, Robert Carradine, and Jake Thomas announcing that they would return to "Lizzie McGuire" to reprise their roles. The series was later cancelled in December 2020 after showrunner Minsky departed from her role.

The series stars Hilary Duff as Lizzie McGuire, who is an ordinary teenager dealing with issues confronted by adolescents in their daily lives. A unique feature of the show is that her thoughts and emotions are expressed by her sarcastic animated alter ego. Lalaine and Adam Lamberg play the roles of Miranda and Gordo, who are Lizzie's best friends. Other co-stars include Jake Thomas, Hallie Todd and Robert Carradine as Matt, Jo and Sam McGuire respectively. On November 23, 2004, the first twenty-two episodes of the show were released in a DVD box set in the United States.

Since the episodes are shown according to their air date, and not the order in which they were filmed, which usually shows the chronology of the episodes, some continuity errors are presented throughout the series – for example "Pool Party", released as the fourth episode of the first season, was the very first episode filmed, and shows the animated Lizzie introducing the characters for the first time, and in the episode "Bye Bye Hillridge Junior High", the final episode produced, was aired in the middle of the second season; it shows Lizzie and her classmates graduating from middle school, giving way to the events of the movie. The series' production order most closely reflects the intended chronological episode order, aka the order in which the episodes were filmed. Lalaine's character Miranda did not appear in episodes with production codes 229–234, the last 6 episodes filmed for the show, since Lalaine left the show to work on the film You Wish!. Lalaine was also absent in The Lizzie McGuire Movie which went to theatres in May 2003, in that time being because Lalaine was busy with Radio Disney Concert Tours.

== Series overview ==
| Season | Episodes | Originally released | |
| Season | Episodes | First released | Last released |
|---|---|---|---|
| 1 | 31 | January 12, 2001 | January 18, 2002 |
| 2 | 34 | February 8, 2002 | February 14, 2004 |
| Film | | May 2, 2003 | |

== Episodes ==
=== Season 1 (2001–2002) ===
| No. overall | No. in season | Title | Directed by | Written by | Original release date | Prod. code |
|---|---|---|---|---|---|---|
| 1 | 1 | "Rumors" | Neal Israel | Melissa Gould | January 12, 2001 | 103 |
When Lizzie accidentally starts a mean rumor about Kate in a fit of jealousy after Kate makes the cheerleading squad and Lizzie doesn't, Miranda stands up for her best friend and takes the blame. Unfortunately, she has to deal with the fallout of hurting Kate's feelings. Meanwhile, Matt gets a lizard for school and names it Lizzie. When the lizard gets lost and turns up dead, Matt gets upset. It turns out that she's just hibernating. Note: Disney Channel broadcast a "special sneak peek" of this episode of Lizzie McGuire after the premiere of the Disney Channel Original Movie, Zenon: The Zequel on January 12, 2001. Disney's official Lizzie McGuire website listed "Rumors" as episode #5, and it was broadcast again on February 3, 2001, a day after the premiere of the episode "Pool Party".
| 2 | 2 | "Picture Day" | Neal Israel | Douglas Tuber & Tim Maile | January 19, 2001 | 102 |
Lizzie's parents make her wear a unicorn sweater that she hates to school for picture day. Gordo wants to do a tough pose for his picture. Miranda wears the same outfit as Kate to get pictures. Matt has an unstudied test so he decides to fake sick. Note: Disney Channel's on-air promos that were broadcast on January 19, 2001 identified this episode as the series premiere of Lizzie McGuire, even though a sneak preview of the episode "Rumors" had been aired the week before. Disney's official Lizzie McGuire website listed "Picture Day" as episode #1.
| 3 | 3 | "When Moms Attack" | Mark Rosman | Nina G. Bargiel & Jeremy J. Bargiel | January 26, 2001 | 105 |
Lizzie is happy to be on her way to a school camping trip, but is unhappy when she finds out that her mom is a chaperone. Will her mom embarrass her to death? With Jo gone, Sam and Matt are left home alone trying to figure out what to cook for dinner.
| 4 | 4 | "Pool Party" | Larry Shaw | Terri Minsky | February 2, 2001 | 101 |
When Lizzie is not allowed to go to a pool party thrown by Danny Kessler, due to Nana's birthday, Miranda becomes best friends with Kate again temporarily. Note: This is the first episode filmed.
| 5 | 5 | "I've Got Rhythmic" | Alan Myerson | Nancy Neufeld Callaway | February 9, 2001 | 104 |
In an effort to prove she is really good at something, Lizzie trains for rhythmic gymnastics. This makes Kate jealous.
| 6 | 6 | "Jack of All Trades" | Savage Steve Holland | Trish Baker | February 23, 2001 | 106 |
Convinced that Mr. Pettus is unwilling to give him a fair grade, Gordo switches science projects with Lizzie.
| 7 | 7 | "Aaron Carter's Coming to Town" "Here Comes Aaron Carter" | Savage Steve Holland | Nina G. Bargiel & Jeremy J. Bargiel | March 23, 2001 | 118 |
Aaron Carter is in town shooting a music video. Miranda, Gordo, and Lizzie sneak past guards to meet Aaron Carter. Unfortunately, they are unaware that Mr. McGuire has bought them passes to get to the shoot with no trouble.
| 8 | 8 | "Misadventures in Babysitting" "Misadventures of Babysitting" | Mark Rosman | David Blum & Stacy Kramer | April 6, 2001 | 107 |
Lizzie tries to prove to her parents that she is responsible enough to babysit Matt.
| 9 | 9 | "Election" | Brian K. Roberts | Melissa Gould | April 20, 2001 | 108 |
When students have to choose between Larry Tudgeman and Claire Miller for class president, Lizzie decides to run for office. However, she finds that gaining the favor of all her classmates won't be easy. Matt gets an imaginary friend named Jasper and it turns out to be a scam to get his parents to give him stuff. Jo and Sam use this to punish Matt after they hear his phone call with Oscar.
| 10 | 10 | "I Do, I Don't" | Steve De Jarnatt | Nina G. Bargiel & Jeremy J. Bargiel | April 27, 2001 | 109 |
Lizzie's social studies class is paired off for a class assignment, where they have to pretend to be married and return for a school reunion. Lizzie, a little upset that Miranda got Ethan instead of her, neglects Gordo as her husband.
| 11 | 11 | "Bad Girl McGuire" | Anson Williams | Melissa Gould | May 4, 2001 | 110 |
Lizzie becomes friends with a bad girl and develops bad habits and a bad personality. Miranda and Gordo are concerned with this and decide to help Lizzie become her old self. Matt is given the freedom to stay up late at night, but after initial euphoria, he starts having problems with staying awake during the daytime. Miranda and Gordo create a short video to convince Lizzie to be good again.
| 12 | 12 | "Between a Rock and a Bra Place" | Mark Rosman | Nina G. Bargiel & Jeremy J. Bargiel | May 11, 2001 | 111 |
Lizzie and Miranda go shopping for their first bras with Lizzie's mom embarrassing them along the way. Meanwhile, Matt asks for Gordo's help to direct a martial arts film to enter in a contest. Special Guest Star David Carradine appears as himself. Note: Carradine is the brother of Robert Carradine, who plays Mr. McGuire.
| 13 | 13 | "Come Fly with Me" | Timothy Busfield | Douglas Tuber & Tim Maile | June 1, 2001 | 112 |
In order to stand out of the crowd, Gordo dons 1960s attire (including a Sinatra fedora) and starts listening to the Rat Pack. But he is disappointed when the trend catches on with the whole school, including Lizzie and Miranda. Matt and Lanny try their hand at creating a record in order to get their names featured in the Guinness World Records. Note: The title of the episode comes from the title of a popular Frank Sinatra song of the same name.
| 14 | 14 | "Random Acts of Miranda" | Steve De Jarnatt | Douglas Tuber & Tim Maile | June 8, 2001 | 113 |
Lizzie gives Miranda a bad review when she plays the lead role in the school play. Miranda soon realizes that singing is her main talent, rather than acting. Matt and Lanny want a pair of walkie-talkies, but Matt's parents refuse to pay for it. So Matt sells everything he owns, including his bed and clothes, to get the money.
| 15 | 15 | "Lizzie's Nightmare" | Jace Alexander | Melissa Gould | June 22, 2001 | 114 |
Lizzie is in a frenzy because Ethan has asked her to sit with him at lunch the next day. Matt accidentally boards the wrong school bus and spends a day at Lizzie's school, where Lizzie has a harrowing time when everyone is besotted with Matt, including Ethan.
| 16 | 16 | "Obsession" | Savage Steve Holland | Nina G. Bargiel & Jeremy J. Bargiel | June 29, 2001 | 116 |
Lizzie becomes obsessed with volunteering after a school volunteer project. Meanwhile, Gordo becomes obsessed with winning the Science Olympics, and Matt goes power-crazy with his new hall monitor job.
| 17 | 17 | "Sibling Bonds" | Mark Rosman | Douglas Tuber & Tim Maile | August 3, 2001 | 119 |
Lizzie has to attend a class charity drive and looks forward to spend the whole day with Ethan. At home, Matt irritates Lizzie with his magic tricks and he handcuffs himself to Lizzie and loses the key. Meanwhile, Jo finds the key and decides to remain silent about it so that Lizzie and Matt learn a lesson about family bonding, getting along, and looking out for each other. Lizzie has a hard time keeping Matt hidden from Ethan for the whole day leading to embarrassing situations.
| 18 | 18 | "Rated Aargh" | Peter Montgomery | Trish Baker | August 10, 2001 | 121 |
Lizzie and her friends lie to each of their parents and sneak off to see an R-rated movie that everyone else at school has seen. While at the movie theater, Lizzie saves a man who is choking on a candy ball and gets interviewed by a TV crew. Lizzie's parents come to know about it and Lizzie gets busted. Meanwhile, Matt is having a fair at school and Jo decides to build a velcro-wall in which kids can jump onto.
| 19 | 19 | "Gordo and the Girl" | Kim Friedman | Melissa Gould | August 17, 2001 | 120 |
Lizzie and Miranda feel neglected when Gordo spends more time with his new girlfriend Brooke (Kyla Pratt). They are unable to come to terms with the fact that Gordo has a girlfriend now and he is drifting away from their group. Meanwhile, Matt learns about "percentages" from his father and starts accepting bets from his friends, but he eventually lands in trouble when his mother finds out about this.
| 20 | 20 | "Educating Ethan" | Mark Rosman | Nina G. Bargiel & Jeremy J. Bargiel | August 24, 2001 | 122 |
Gordo becomes Ethan's math tutor because he needs the money to buy a new stereo. However, once Lizzie shows Ethan an easier way to do math, he decides he wants Lizzie as his tutor, and not Gordo. Meanwhile at home, Matt and his friend Oscar try to emulate superheroes by trying to help people. However, their noble intentions are not well received by people around them as they unknowingly cause harm to them.
| 21 | 21 | "Lizzie Strikes Out" | Ellen Falcon Gittelsohn | Melissa Gould | August 31, 2001 | 123 |
Ethan invites Lizzie, Gordo, and Miranda for bowling, while on the same day Lizzie's dad wants to spend some quality father-daughter time with her. Meanwhile, Matt and Lanny plan on what they can do to stop the bully, Heywood Biggs, from ripping on them.
| 22 | 22 | "The Untitled Stan Jansen Project" | Anson Williams | Nina G. Bargiel & Jeremy J. Bargiel | September 21, 2001 | 128 |
A big-time movie director offers to follow Gordo around to see a day in the life of a regular kid. Gordo starts saying rude things to the camera, though, and even coaxes Lizzie and Miranda to tell each other's secrets in front of the camera during which it is revealed that Lizzie had a crush on Gordo in the 4th grade. Meanwhile, Matt gets blamed for all the troubles created by Melina and he admires her qualities as a troublemaker.
| 23 | 23 | "Last Year's Model" | Savage Steve Holland | Douglas Tuber & Tim Maile | September 28, 2001 | 124 |
Lizzie is selected as a model to participate in a fashion show presented by Teen Attitude magazine at a local mall. Her modeling stint earns her fame in the school, but she is annoyed when everyone starts treating her differently because of her new status. Meanwhile, Matt and Lanny buy a hammock from a shop but when it turns out to be defective, the shopkeeper refuses to take it back and give them a refund. Matt and Lanny then decide to teach him a lesson.
| 24 | 24 | "Night of the Day of the Dead" | Brian K. Roberts | Douglas Tuber & Tim Maile | October 5, 2001 | 115 |
Lizzie wants to become the "Dungeon mistress" for the 7th grade Halloween fright night at school. However, Kate becomes the dungeon mistress and Lizzie is forced to become a clown. Peeved by this, Lizzie, Gordo, Miranda, and Matt devise a plan to embarrass and humiliate Kate in front of the whole school.
| 25 | 25 | "Facts of Life" | Mark Rosman | Douglas Tuber & Tim Maile | October 12, 2001 | 126 |
Hoping to win a trip to Miami, Florida, Lizzie, Miranda, and Gordo team up to enter the school's "Fact-athlon" contest. Mr. Digg coaches them for the quiz in an unconventional way but they eventually end up losing. Matt and Lanny hire a drummer and start their own rock band, but in the end they call it quits.
| 26 | 26 | "Scarlett Larry" | Steve De Jarnatt | Amy Engelberg & Wendy Engelberg | November 9, 2001 | 127 |
Lizzie discovers that Larry Tudgeman has a crush on her and when he asks her out, she reluctantly agrees to go out with him. Surprisingly, Lizzie enjoys the date, but eventually in the end, they part ways. Meanwhile, while cleaning up some junk, Matt and Sam find an old Soap-Box Derby racer and decide to restore it.
| 27 | 27 | "Gordo and the Dwarves" "Gordo and the Magic Dwarves" | Savage Steve Holland | Douglas Tuber & Tim Maile | November 16, 2001 | 129 |
Gordo becomes obsessed with a Dungeons & Dragons-type board game which was gifted to Lizzie by her grandmother. His obsession causes his grades to drop. Lizzie and Miranda enlist Matt's help to bring Gordo back to his senses. Meanwhile, Matt has to observe wildlife for a school project, but eventually, Sam and Miranda's father end up climbing a tree and watching a bird's nest.
| 28 | 28 | "Lizzie and Kate's Excellent Adventure" | Savage Steve Holland | Nina G. Bargiel & Jeremy J. Bargiel | November 30, 2001 | 131 |
After being absent from school, Lizzie finds out that her project partner is none other than Kate Sanders, who was also absent on the same day. After their initial hostility, they both start getting along together. After the project is over, they both take potshots at each other but not before sharing a secret smile and realizing that they still have a bond between them. Meanwhile, Matt is convinced that he has psychic powers and has a hard time convincing his mother about it.
| 29 | 29 | "The Courtship of Miranda Sanchez" "Courtship of Miranda" | Steve De Jarnatt | Melissa Gould | December 7, 2001 | 125 |
Miranda is smitten with a boy in her class, but is too nervous to talk to him, so Lizzie decides to help her out. A misunderstanding leads the boy to believe that Lizzie has a crush on him. Gordo is sick of listening to all the girl-talk between Lizzie and Miranda and decides to indulge in some male bonding with Matt.
| 30 | 30 | "Gordo's Video" | Steve De Jarnatt | Kris Lowe | January 1, 2002 | 117 |
Gordo installs video cameras all around the school, revealing embarrassing secrets about the students. Further, he plans to enter his film into the district film competition. Miranda gets upset upon hearing this as the film showed her in a bad light. However, Gordo pleases all when he showcases the film without revealing anyone's identity. Meanwhile, Matt decides to become a stuntman and tries out various stunts.
| 31 | 31 | "Gordo's Bar Mitzvah" | Anson Williams | Melissa Gould | January 18, 2002 | 130 |
Gordo feels self conscious when he sees Ethan Craft and Larry Tudgeman growing up sooner than he is. He tries to be "manly" by trying to do manly things, but in the end he decides to have a bar mitzvah which would initiate him into adult life. Meanwhile, Jo becomes fed up with her husband not taking things seriously when Matt misbehaves and goes on strike, forcing Sam to deal with their son's behavior.

=== Season 2 (2002–2004) ===
| No. overall | No. in season | Title | Directed by | Written by | Original release date | Prod. code |
|---|---|---|---|---|---|---|
| 32 | 1 | "First Kiss" | Steve De Jarnatt | Terri Minsky | February 8, 2002 | 203 |
Lizzie has her first boyfriend, named Ronnie, who is the local neighborhood paper boy. Lizzie is completely head-over-toenails in love with him, and Miranda and Gordo are fed up listening to Lizzie talk about him all the time. However, Lizzie is heartbroken when Ronnie breaks up with her to go out with a girl from his school. In the end, Lizzie is consoled by Gordo. Meanwhile, Matt needs only one baseball card to complete his card collection but only Melina has it. Melina agrees to give the card to Matt, but only if he does her homework and other chores for her.
| 33 | 2 | "El Oro De Montezuma" | Savage Steve Holland | Douglas Tuber & Tim Maile | February 22, 2002 | 204 |
Lizzie, Miranda and Gordo are obsessed with a Mexican game show, "El Oro de Montezuma" ("The Gold of Montezuma"). Miranda's cousin Carlos from Mexico City is scheduled to compete on the show and Lizzie and her friends decide to be in his team. Meanwhile, Matt and Lanny play an extreme version of Hide and Seek.
| 34 | 3 | "Mom's Best Friend" | Steve De Jarnatt | Douglas Tuber & Tim Maile | March 8, 2002 | 205 |
Lizzie and her mom become best friends after reading a book in social studies. She even convinces Gordo and Miranda to bond well with their parents. But in the end, Lizzie realizes that it would take some time to be more intimate with her mom. Meanwhile, Matt and Lanny find a chimp which creates havoc in the house, for which they both are blamed.
| 35 | 4 | "The Rise and Fall of the Kate Empire" | Anson Williams | Nina G. Bargiel & Jeremy J. Bargiel | March 15, 2002 | 206 |
When Kate dislocates her shoulder during cheerleading practice, Claire usurps Kate's position as captain. Lizzie helps Kate regain her popularity and a place in the cheerleading squad. Matt is excited to be in a school play and acts arrogant about it. He starts bossing his parents and Lanny around, but in the end he loses his voice and learns a lesson in humility.
| 36 | 5 | "Working Girl" | Anson Williams | Nina G. Bargiel & Jeremy J. Bargiel | March 29, 2002 | 210 |
Miffed with her parents for not raising her allowance, Lizzie gets her first job as a busboy at the Digital Bean. But to Lizzie's surprise, it is a lot worse than she ever suspected it would be. Matt has some problems with Melina and turns to Miranda for advice. In the process, he develops a huge crush on Miranda, much to her horror and Gordo's amusement.
| 37 | 6 | "And the Winner is" | Peter Montgomery | Melissa Gould | April 26, 2002 | 211 |
Lizzie, Miranda and Gordo have a fight and stop talking to each other. Meanwhile, Kate and Gordo, Miranda and Larry, Lizzie and Ethan, are paired up for a treasure hunt-styled school project. Matt learns of it and, unknown to them, beats them to the finish line. As the school project progresses, Lizzie, Miranda and Gordo realize the worth of their friendship and renew their ties.
| 38 | 7 | "The Longest Yard" | Steve De Jarnatt | Nina G. Bargiel & Jeremy J. Bargiel | May 17, 2002 | 213 |
Lizzie baby-sits Matt once again, with Matt deflating their father's prized autographed football. They work all day to get it back.
| 39 | 8 | "Just Friends" | Mark Rosman | Douglas Tuber & Tim Maile | June 14, 2002 | 218 |
Gordo encourages Lizzie to finally do something about her crush on Ethan Craft -- that is, ask him to the Sadie Hawkins Day dance. When Lizzie asks Ethan for the dance, he disappoints her by saying he likes her as a 'friend', and does not want to risk changing it by going out with her. Lizzie then tries to change her image in order to please Ethan, but he still lets her down by saying they don't have a lot of chemistry. Matt and Lanny open a club in their backyard and their beverage becomes quite popular. But in the end, they are forced to shut it down.
| 40 | 9 | "Those Freaky McGuires" | Oz Scott | Melissa Gould | June 28, 2002 | 214 |
In this Freaky Friday-inspired episode, Lizzie and Matt switch bodies for a day. Matt (in Lizzie's body) and Lizzie (in Matt's body) go to each other's school and end up in amusing situations. They both solve each other's problems at school but the next day, they return to their normal selves, leading Lizzie to wonder whether it was all a bad dream.
| 41 | 10 | "In Miranda Lizzie Does Not Trust" | Alan Cohn | Douglas Tuber & Tim Maile | July 5, 2002 | 212 |
Lizzie has a hard time standing up for Miranda when she is accused of shoplifting. This creates a rift between both of them, causing them to choose different dance partners in their dancing class in P.E. However, in the end both realize their mistake and become friends again. Meanwhile, Matt hosts a talk show along with Lanny on the internet.
| 42 | 11 | "Over the Hill" | Savage Steve Holland | Alison Taylor | July 12, 2002 | 207 |
Lizzie starts feeling inferior when she realizes a lot of the other kids around her have special talents and skills that they've developed, including Gordo with his filmmaking and Miranda with her violin. Meanwhile, Matt is scared after watching a horror movie and is convinced that their house is haunted.
| 43 | 12 | "Best Dressed for Less" "Best Dressed for Much Less" | Tim O'Donnell | Bob Thomas | July 19, 2002 | 217 |
Lizzie wants to be voted "best dressed" in her school and wants to buy an expensive pair of jeans. But her Mom refuses and insists on buying her clothes at discount store. Meanwhile, Matt has problems adjusting with his newly acquired fame because of his participation on The Uncle Wendel Show.
| 44 | 13 | "You're a Good Man, Lizzie McGuire" | Peter Montgomery | Alison Taylor | July 26, 2002 | 216 |
While Lizzie and Kate are stuck working together for the Spring Fling committee, Lizzie sees Kate knock over the bust of the school's founding principal. When Principal Tweedy (Phill Lewis) discovers this, he cancels the Spring Fling unless the person responsible comes forward. Kate keeps quiet so Lizzie decides to take the blame and is excluded from attending the fling. Lizzie is sitting at home sad, until everyone at school comes over to her house, as they decided to have the fling at her place, while Kate is left all alone at school. Meanwhile, Matt and Lanny have a hard time sharing a bike.
| 45 | 14 | "Just Like Lizzie" | Anson Williams | Melissa Gould | August 9, 2002 | 201 |
Lizzie begins mentoring a seventh-grader girl named Andie (Amy Castle), who begins to mimic her characteristics and behave like Lizzie. Initially flattered, Lizzie starts to dislike Andie and advises her to stop aping her blindly and be herself. Finally, Andie ends up being Kate's protege. Meanwhile, Matt must earn a merit patch with his Wilderness Cadets group, or he would be demoted. Sam tries to help, but ends up harming himself.
| 46 | 15 | "Lizzie in the Middle" | Savage Steve Holland | Nina G. Bargiel & Jeremy J. Bargiel | August 23, 2002 | 223 |
Frankie Muniz comes to town to shoot his new movie and befriends Lizzie. Lizzie and her friends learn a little about the pressures of teen stardom. Matt becomes Lizzie's secretary and tries to use his sister's fame for his own advantage. This episode aired a year before their roles in the movie, Agent Cody Banks.
| 47 | 16 | "Inner Beauty" | Mark Rosman | Melissa Gould | August 30, 2002 | 208 |
Miranda has a misconceived notion that she is fat and begins to skip meals to look slim for a music video directed by Gordo. Miranda begins to develop an eating disorder and Lizzie and Gordo are concerned about it. However, in the end Lizzie convinces Miranda to be comfortable with her body and persuades her to stop dieting. Meanwhile, Matt shows a great artistic potential and his parents encourage him to pursue it. However, he gets into trouble when he trashes their house and uses their family car as canvas for his paintings.
| 48 | 17 | "Movin' On Up" | Mark Rosman | Nina G. Bargiel & Jeremy J. Bargiel | September 13, 2002 | 202 |
Gordo skips a grade and gets promoted to high school. After initial euphoria, Lizzie and Miranda start to miss Gordo. Gordo too feels lonely at the high school but pretends to like it in front of Lizzie and Miranda. In the end, he returns to middle school. Meanwhile, Matt and Lanny plan to try out for the cheerleading squad at school but Sam feels that it's not a "manly" thing to do. Sam tries to lean away Matt from cheerleading by doing some "manly" things with him, but in the end he changes his mind and encourages Matt to try for cheerleading.
| 49 | 18 | "Party Over Here" | Savage Steve Holland | Alison Taylor | September 20, 2002 | 209 |
Kate is having a big birthday party and she invites everyone from her class including Lizzie, Miranda and Gordo. But Lizzie and Miranda's parents refuse to let them go to the party as there would be no adults around (and Kate's cousin Amy (Haylie Duff) doesn't make good chaperone material). So, Lizzie, Miranda and Gordo lie at their homes and go to the party anyway. But the party goes horribly wrong and Lizzie calls her mother for help. Eventually, all three are grounded for lying and going to the party anyway. Meanwhile, Matt and Sam are selected to star in a commercial for Cardio Punch Sports Drink.
| 50 | 19 | "She Said, He Said, She Said" | Brian K. Roberts | Melissa Gould | November 22, 2002 | 222 |
A major food fight erupts in the cafeteria, and Lizzie, Kate and Larry stay after school to clean up the mess until someone confesses up to starting the fight. Matt and Lanny miss their bus while on a school field trip and end up wandering in the city all by themselves.
| 51 | 20 | "Xtreme Xmas" | Savage Steve Holland | Douglas Tuber & Tim Maile | December 6, 2002 | 233 |
Lizzie is determined to win the Best Float award at the Christmas parade with the help of Gordo and her family, but they're busy helping fix the plumbing at an old people's home. Absent: Lalaine as Miranda Sanchez
| 52 | 21 | "Lizzie's Eleven" | Robert Carradine | Douglas Tuber & Tim Maile | January 1, 2003 | 229 |
Lizzie tries to get all eleven of her pictures in the school yearbook, but it would not be easy with Kate as the editor. So, Lizzie's family and friends hatch up a conspiracy to get the job done. Absent: Lalaine as Miranda Sanchez
| 53 | 22 | "Dear Lizzie" | Mark Rosman | Nina G. Bargiel & Jeremy J. Bargiel | January 24, 2003 | 230 |
Lizzie starts an advice column on her school's website, but soon finds it difficult to handle when her good intentions backfire, especially when Gordo's liking her as more than a friend, is almost accidentally revealed to her. Meanwhile, Matt feels threatened by a new prankster in the class who is gaining more popularity than he is. Absent: Lalaine as Miranda Sanchez
| 54 | 23 | "Clue-Less" | Peter Montgomery | Douglas Tuber & Tim Maile | January 31, 2003 | 232 |
Lizzie's friends and family play a murder mystery party game at her house. Lizzie solves the mystery first but lets Gordo believe that he solved it first. In the end, Gordo is about to ask Lizzie out, but Sam interrupts and ruins their special moment. Absent: Lalaine as Miranda Sanchez
| 55 | 24 | "Bye Bye Hillridge Junior High" | Ken Ceizler | Jaime Becker | February 7, 2003 | 234 |
Lizzie and her friends are graduating from middle school. They all sign each other's yearbooks, except Gordo, who is unable to decide on what to write in Lizzie's book. He eventually writes something heartwarming and is rewarded by a kiss from Lizzie while posing for the class photograph. Meanwhile, Matt is unable to bear the summer heat at home, and thinks of various methods to keep himself cool. Note: Chronologically, this is the series finale. Absent: Lalaine as Miranda Sanchez
| 56 | 25 | "Bunkies" | Anson Williams | Bob Thomas | February 21, 2003 | 220 |
All the kids at school are asked to put their hand prints on a wall, symbolizing unity. A water pipe bursts in a wall in Matt's room and to Lizzie's horror she'll have to share her room with her brother for a week until the repairs are done.
| 57 | 26 | "A Gordo Story" | Savage Steve Holland | Nina G. Bargiel & Jeremy J. Bargiel | February 28, 2003 | 215 |
Parker, a girl that Gordo likes, turns down his offer to go with him to the school dance because of his height. Matt has to write a school report on his ancestors but he makes his report sound quite 'interesting'.
| 58 | 27 | "Grubby Longjohns" "Grubby Longjohn's Olde Tyme Revue" | Steve De Jarnatt | Douglas Tuber & Tim Maile | March 14, 2003 | 219 |
The McGuire family members (all except Lizzie) are all psyched about making their annual journey to Grubby Gulch, a "Wild West" theme park, after missing last year's trip. Lizzie, Miranda, and Gordo are reluctant to go for the trip, but Matt is very excited about it. Lizzie, Miranda and Gordo meet a boy and a girl respectively at the cafe, and arrange a date at the mall, but Lizzie's parents won't let them go, so they feign illness to go on the date.
| 59 | 28 | "The Greatest Crush of All" | Rachel Feldman | Douglas Tuber & Tim Maile | March 21, 2003 | 224 |
Lizzie, Miranda and almost every girl in their class have a crush on their new English teacher, Mr. Keith, who is from Scotland. Meanwhile, Fredo the chimp comes to stay at the McGuire's home and Matt is not happy with it. With some intervention from Jo and Sam, soon Matt and Fredo are getting along very well.
| 60 | 29 | "Grand Ole Grandma" | Savage Steve Holland | Melissa Gould | April 4, 2003 | 226 |
Gordo's grandmother (Doris Roberts) now lives a more exciting lifestyle since the last time she and Gordo met. This irritates Gordo, but impresses Lizzie and Miranda. Meanwhile, Lizzie's parents feel ill and are confined to bed. Lizzie and Matt thus enjoy their unsupervised freedom at home.
| 61 | 30 | "My Fair Larry" | Mark Rosman | Nina G. Bargiel & Jeremy J. Bargiel | May 16, 2003 | 227 |
Miranda is throwing a big house party, and refuses to invite Larry. Lizzie feels bad about it and decides to give him a makeover and sneak him into the party. Meanwhile, Matt and Melina make friends with an elderly couple as a part of a school project and find that the old couple are just like them.
| 62 | 31 | "The Gordo Shuffle" | Steve De Jarnatt | Melissa Gould | June 13, 2003 | 231 |
Gordo receives a credit card by mail with a $5,000 line of credit and he uses it to direct a "big-budget" film. Matt is having problems finishing his school science project in time. Absent: Lalaine as Miranda Sanchez
| 63 | 32 | "My Dinner With Mr. Dig" | Rusty Russ | Melissa Gould | August 15, 2003 | 228 |
Lizzie feels uneasy, when her dad becomes best friends with Mr. Dig. Meanwhile, Matt is having a hard time with his mean teacher Miss Chapman. Note: This is the last episode that Lalaine filmed before she left the series.
| 64 | 33 | "One of the Guys" | Steve De Jarnatt | Nina G. Bargiel & Jeremy J. Bargiel | November 21, 2003 | 225 |
After setting a new school record in gym and then beating Ethan Craft in arm-wrestling, Lizzie is invited to play touch football with the "cute guys". But Lizzie is worried when Ethan calls her a "dude", and she feels that she is losing her femininity by playing football. The gym teacher, Coach Kelly, reassures her, and also reveals that Ethan calls everybody a "dude". Unknown to Matt, Fredo the chimp completes his math homework, which gets him good grades in school and praise from his parents.
| 65 | 34 | "Magic Train" | Henry Chan | Amy and Wendy Engelberg | February 14, 2004 | 221 |
Kate sees Lizzie, Miranda, and Gordo at the audience of a kiddie TV program called Clover and Daisy's Magic Train, and teases them about it (in school). Meanwhile, Matt showcases his house as a 'Dust Museum', and shows the visitors around.

=== Film (2003) ===
| Title | Directed by | Written by | Original release date |
|---|---|---|---|
| The Lizzie McGuire Movie | Jim Fall | Susan Estelle Jansen, Ed Decter, and John J. Strauss | May 2, 2003 |
Lizzie McGuire has graduated from middle school and takes a trip to Rome, Italy with her class. And what was supposed to be only a normal trip, becomes a teenager's dream come true. Note: Despite serving as the canonical ending of the Lizzie McGuire series, with the main characters graduating middle school, new episodes of the series continued to air for almost a year after the release of the film. Absent: Lalaine as Miranda Sanchez
