= What a Cartoon! =

American animated anthology series

- Intertitle for What a Cartoon! in its original incarnation designed by Jesse Stagg
- Also known as: World Premiere Toons; The What a Cartoon! Show; The Cartoon Cartoon Show
- Genre: Comedy; Variety
- Created by: Fred Seibert
- Theme music composer: Gary Lionelli
- Country of origin: United States
- Original language: English
- No. of episodes: 16 (48 segments) (list of episodes)

Production
- Executive producers: Buzz Potamkin; Larry Huber; Sherry Gunther
- Producers: Joey Ahlbum; John R. Dilworth; Christine McClenahan; Richard Ostiguy; Michael N. Ruggiero
- Running time: 22 minutes (three 7-minute segments)
- Production companies: Hanna-Barbera Cartoons; Cartoon Network Studios

Original release
- Network: Cartoon Network
- Release: February 20, 1995 – November 28, 1997

Related
- The Cartoonstitute; Cartoon Network Shorts Department; Cartoon Cartoons; List of titles: Space Ghost Coast to Coast; Dexter's Laboratory; Johnny Bravo; Cow and Chicken; I Am Weasel; The Powerpuff Girls; Courage the Cowardly Dog; Mike, Lu & Og; Sheep in the Big City; Grim & Evil; Whatever Happened to... Robot Jones?; Codename: Kids Next Door; Megas XLR

What a Cartoon! (later known as The What a Cartoon! Show and The Cartoon Cartoon Show) is an American animated anthology series on Cartoon Network created by Fred Seibert and produced by Hanna-Barbera Cartoons. It consists of a total of 48 cartoons.

It was conceived to return creative power to animators and artists by recreating the atmospheres that spawned the iconic cartoon characters of the mid-20th century, and premiered as three shorts aired together in a half-hour episode. The Cartoon Network production tag was added to some shorts during its run.

What a Cartoon! premiered on February 20, 1995, as a segment on Space Ghost Coast to Coast called "1st Annual World Premiere Toon-In", and featured interviews with animators Craig McCracken, Pat Ventura, Van Partible, Eugene Mattos, and Genndy Tartakovsky, as well as model Dian Parkinson. During its run, the series was retitled to The What a Cartoon! Show and later to The Cartoon Cartoon Show until the final shorts aired on August 23, 2002.

The series was influential for the network, helping to revive television animation in the 1990s. Many of its segments went on to be Cartoon Network animated television series, such as Dexter's Laboratory, Johnny Bravo, Courage the Cowardly Dog, Cow and Chicken, I Am Weasel, and The Powerpuff Girls. Its original shorts became the first Cartoon Cartoons. From 2005 to 2008, The Cartoon Cartoon Show was revived as a block for reruns of older Cartoon Cartoons that had been phased out by the network.

== History ==
=== Origins and production ===
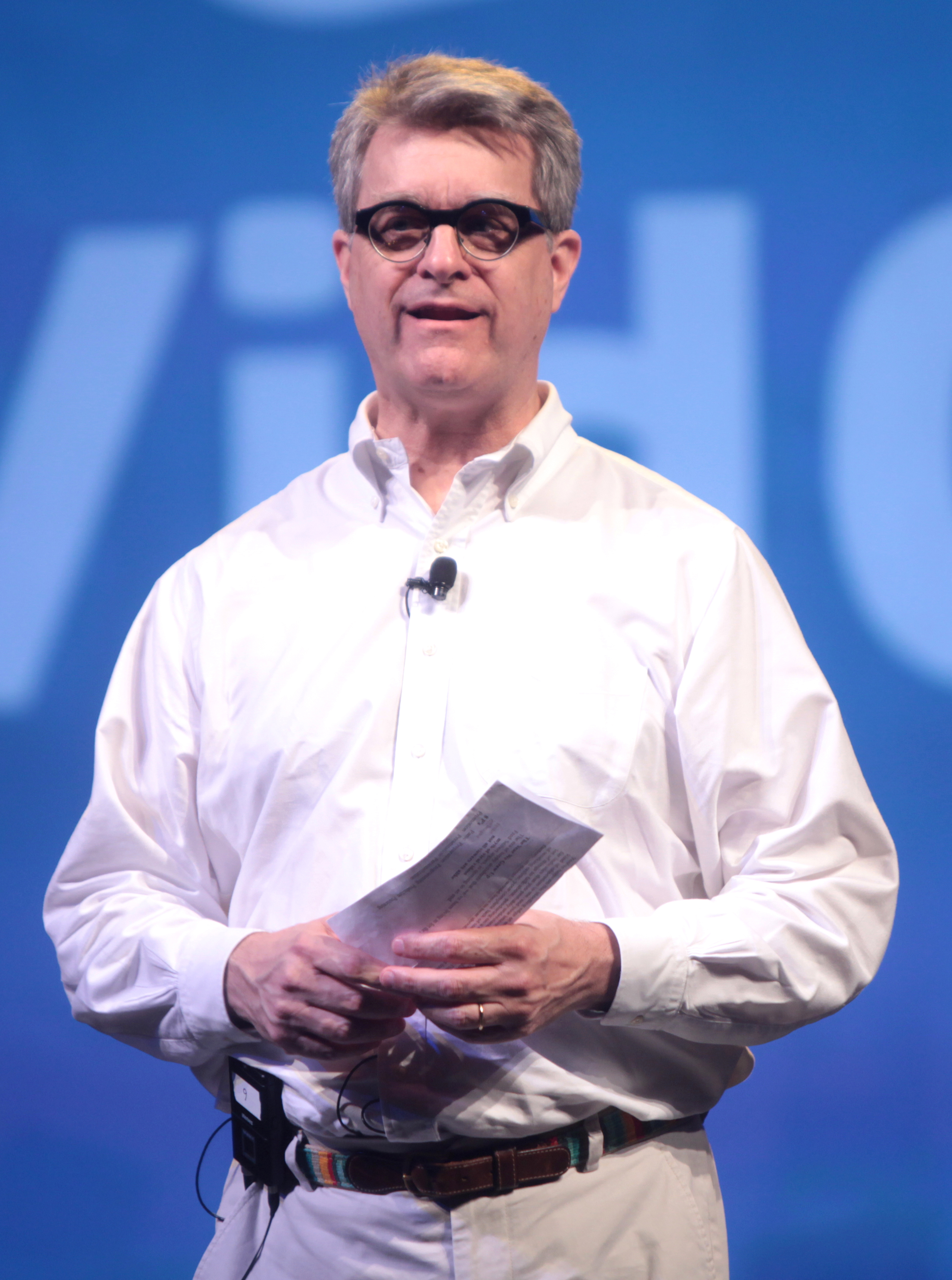
What a Cartoon! creator Fred Seibert at VidCon 2014.

Fred Seibert became president of Hanna-Barbera Cartoons in 1992 and helped guide the struggling animation studio into its greatest output in years with shows like 2 Stupid Dogs and SWAT Kats: The Radical Squadron. Seibert wanted the studio to produce short cartoons, in the vein of the Golden age of American animation. Although a project consisting of 48 shorts would cost twice as much as a normal series, Seibert's pitch to Cartoon Network involved promising 48 chances to "succeed or fail", opened up possibilities for new original programming, and offered several new shorts to the thousands already present in the Turner Entertainment Co. library. According to Seibert, quality did not matter much to the cable operators distributing the struggling network, they were more interested in promising new programs.

With Turner Broadcasting CEO Ted Turner and Seibert's boss Scott Sassa on board, the studio fanned out across the world to spread the word that the studio was in an "unprecedented phase", in which animators had a better idea what cartoons should be than executives and Hanna-Barbera supported them. The company started taking pitches in earnest in 1993 and received over 5,000 pitches for the 48 slots. The diversity in the filmmakers included those from various nationalities, race, and gender. Seibert later described his hope for an idealistic diversity as "The wider the palette of creative influences, the wider and bigger the audiences."

Seibert's idea for the project was influenced heavily by Looney Tunes. Hanna-Barbera founders and chairmen William Hanna and Joseph Barbera, as well as veteran animator Friz Freleng, taught Seibert how the shorts of the Golden Age of American animation were produced. John Kricfalusi, Hanna-Barbera alumnus and creator of The Ren & Stimpy Show, became a teacher of sorts for Seibert and was the first person Seibert called while looking for new talent for the project.

As was the custom in live action film and television, the company did not pay each creator for the storyboard submitted and pitched. For the first time in the studio's history, individual creators could retain their rights, and earn royalties on their creations. While most in the industry scoffed at the idea, encouragement, according to Seibert, came from the cartoonists who flocked to Hanna-Barbera with original ideas.

=== Format ===
The format for What a Cartoon! was ambitious, as no one had ever attempted anything similar in the television animation era. The shorts produced would be a product of the original cartoonists' vision, with no executive intervention: for example, even the music would be an individually crafted score. Each 7-minute short would debut, by itself, as a stand-alone cartoon or a stand-alone series on Cartoon Network. Three of the 7-minute cartoons are paired together into a half-hour episode. Seibert explained the project's goal in a 2007 blog post: "We didn't care what the sitcom trends were, what Nickelodeon was doing, what the sales departments wanted. [...] We wanted cartoons."

=== Crew ===
"On top of [a research and development program], I reinvigorated the 'who comes in the studio' equation. Now talented people wanted to show up. Some 5,000 people pitched us cartoons from all over the world. We got into business with Ralph Bakshi, with Bruno Bozzetto; we got into business with a broad range of people who never would've given Hanna-Barbera a passing chance. We worked with people who were 70 years old, who were 20 years old. We turned on its head the perception the people in the community had of us."
— Creator Fred Seibert on the variety of directors for What a Cartoon!

The What a Cartoon! staff had creators from Europe (Bruno Bozzetto), Asia (Achiu So), and the United States (Jerry Reynolds and colleague Seth MacFarlane). The crew also contained young series first-timers (like Genndy Tartakovsky, Craig McCracken, Rob Renzetti, Butch Hartman, and John R. Dilworth), but veterans as well (like Don Jurwich, Todd Kauffman, Jerry Eisenberg, and Ralph Bakshi). In addition to the veterans, William Hanna and Joseph Barbera each produced two shorts each for What a Cartoon!. Many of the key crew members from previous Hanna-Barbera series 2 Stupid Dogs joined the team of What a Cartoon! as well.

Many of its crew members later went on to write and direct for Dexter's Laboratory, Johnny Bravo, Cow and Chicken, I Am Weasel, and The Powerpuff Girls, including those named above. The Kitchen Casanova director John McIntyre is particularly known for directing several Dexter episodes. Ralph Bakshi's series (Malcom and Melvin) was considered too risqué to be shown. It has been rumored that John Kricfalusi was slated to direct new Yogi Bear-themed What a Cartoon! shorts of his own under Spümcø.

Inspired by Seibert's interest in the modern rock posters of Frank Kozik, each of the shows' creators worked with the internal Hanna-Barbera Creative Corps creative director Bill Burnett, and senior art director Jesse Stagg, to craft a series of high-quality, limited-edition, fluorescent art posters. The Corps launched a prolonged guerrilla mailing campaign, targeting animation heavyweights and critics leading up to the launch of World Premiere Toons. The first poster campaign of its kind introduced the world to the groundbreaking new stable of characters.

=== Broadcast ===
The first cartoon from the What a Cartoon! project broadcast in its entirety was The Powerpuff Girls in "Meat Fuzzy Lumkins", which made its world premiere on Monday, February 20, 1995, during Cartoon Network's Space Ghost Coast to Coast episode "1st Annual World Premiere Toon-In". Written by Cartoon Network staffer Matt Maiellaro, it was hosted by Space Ghost, humorously interviewing Hanna-Barbera animators while his adversaries judge each individual short. It was simulcast on Cartoon Network, TBS and TNT. To promote the shorts, Cartoon Network's marketing department came up with the concept of "Dive-In Theater" in 1995 to showcase the 48 cartoon shorts. The cartoons were shown at water parks and large municipal swimming pools, treating kids and their parents to exclusive poolside screenings on 9' x 12' movie screens.

Beginning February 26, 1995, each What a Cartoon! short began to premiere on Sunday nights, promoted as World Premiere Toons. Every week after the premiere, Cartoon Network showcased a different World Premiere Toons made by a different artist. After an acclimation of cartoons, the network packaged the shorts as a half-hour show titled World Premiere Toons: The Next Generation, featuring reruns of the original shorts but also new premieres.

Eventually, all of the cartoons were compiled into one program which was used the name World Premiere Toons: The Show until the summer of 1996 when it started bearing the name of the original project: The What a Cartoon! Show. The show's initial premieres for each short preceded Cartoon Network's Sunday night movie block, Mr. Spim's Cartoon Theatre. The shorts continued to air on Sundays until 1997, when the network moved the shorts to Wednesdays at 9pm. Following the premiere of Johnny Bravo and Cow and Chicken as full series in July 1997, the series shifted to Thursday nights, where it remained.

The What a Cartoon! Show continued airing new episodes on Thursdays until November 28, 1997, when the final short of the 48 contracted during Seibert's era aired. In 1998, Cartoon Network debuted two new short pilots and advertised them as World Premiere Toons: Mike, Lu & Og and Kenny and the Chimp, both of which were produced by outside studios (respectively Kinofilm and Curious Pictures) and produced after Time Warner's acquisition of Turner Broadcasting in 1996. The two pilots were later compiled into The Cartoon Cartoon Show, while both shorts eventually garnered their own series, Mike, Lu & Og in 1999 and Codename: Kids Next Door in 2002. Three shorts were retconned into The Cartoon Cartoon Show anthology. Bill Wray's King Crab: Space Crustacean, as well as his former colleague John Kricfalusi's What a Cartoon! shorts, Boo Boo Runs Wild and A Day in the Life of Ranger Smith, aired on the program with minimal Cartoon Cartoons branding in 1999.

On June 9, 2000, The What a Cartoon! Show was relaunched as The Cartoon Cartoon Show. In this new format, it aired reruns and new episodes of the full-series Cartoon Cartoons, as well as new Cartoon Cartoon shorts and old WAC! shorts. From 2000 to 2001, the pilot shorts appearing on the network's viewer's poll that lost to The Grim Adventures of Billy & Mandy and Codename: Kids Next Door (except for Whatever Happened to... Robot Jones?) were added to the anthology. The show continued to air until October 16, 2003, when it was temporarily dropped from the network's schedule.

On September 12, 2005, The Cartoon Cartoon Show was revived, this time as a half-hour program featuring segments of older Cartoon Cartoons that were no longer shown regularly on the network, such as Cow and Chicken, I Am Weasel, and others. Some Cartoon Cartoons were moved exclusively to this show and the Top 5, though there was also some overlap with shows that already had regular half-hour slots outside the series. In 2006, the programming was expanded to also include non-Cartoon Cartoons that were regularly shown on the network, such as Foster's Home for Imaginary Friends, Camp Lazlo, My Gym Partner's a Monkey, and Squirrel Boy. The show ended on June 21, 2008.

In 2007, reruns of What a Cartoon! played briefly on Cartoon Network's retro animation sister channel, Boomerang.

In 2020, a selection of shorts were added to the Cartoon Network website and app.

On July 29, 2024, reruns of What a Cartoon! returned to Cartoon Network, airing only on Monday evenings as part of Adult Swim's Checkered Past block.

== Legacy ==
What a Cartoon! is the first short cartoon incubator created by Fred Seibert. Starting with What a Cartoon! and continuing throughout his cartoon career, his Frederator Studios has persisted in the tradition of surfacing new talent, characters, and series with several cartoon shorts "incubators," including (as of 2016): What a Cartoon! (Cartoon Network, 1995), Nickelodeon/Nicktoons' own Oh Yeah! Cartoons (1998), Nicktoons Film Festival (2004), Random! Cartoons (2008), The Meth Minute 39 (Channel Frederator, 2008), The Cartoonstitute (Cartoon Network, 2009/unfinished), Too Cool! Cartoons (Cartoon Hangover, 2012), and GO! Cartoons (Cartoon Hangover, 2016). These laboratories have spun off notable series like: Dexter's Laboratory, The Powerpuff Girls, Johnny Bravo, Cow and Chicken, Family Guy, Courage the Cowardly Dog, Samurai Jack, The Grim Adventures of Billy & Mandy, Codename: Kids Next Door, The Fairly OddParents, My Life as a Teenage Robot, Nite Fite, The Mighty B!, Fanboy & Chum Chum, Adventure Time, Regular Show, Bravest Warriors, Secret Mountain Fort Awesome, Gravity Falls, Bee and PuppyCat, and Uncle Grandpa.

Dexter's Laboratory was the most popular short series according to a vote held in 1995 and eventually became the first spin-off of What a Cartoon! in 1996. Two more series based on shorts, Johnny Bravo and Cow and Chicken, premiered in 1997, and The Powerpuff Girls became a weekly half-hour show in 1998. Courage the Cowardly Dog (spun off from the Oscar-nominated short The Chicken from Outer Space) followed as the final spin-off in 1999. In addition, the Cow and Chicken short I Am Weasel eventually was also spun off into a separate series: in all, six cartoon series were ultimately launched by the What a Cartoon! project, any one of which earned enough money for the company to pay for the whole program. In addition to the eventual spin-offs, the What a Cartoon! short Larry and Steve by Seth MacFarlane featured prototypes of characters that would later go on to become MacFarlane's massively successful Family Guy.

The What a Cartoon! project and its assorted spin-offs brought Cartoon Network more commercial and critical success, and the network became an animation industry leader as the 1990s drew to a close. In 2001, coinciding with the death of William Hanna, Hanna-Barbera Productions was absorbed into Warner Bros. Animation and Cartoon Network opened its own production arm, Cartoon Network Studios, in Burbank, as the rightful Hanna-Barbera successor to produce original programming for the network and future projects. Two What a Cartoon! shorts, Wind-Up Wolf and Hard Luck Duck, were the last cartoon shorts directed and produced by co-founder and co-chairman William Hanna. In addition, What a Cartoon! and spin-offs were the final original productions released by Hanna-Barbera.

Creator of The What a Cartoon! Show, Fred Seibert, left Hanna-Barbera in late 1996 to open up his own studio, Frederator Studios, and has persistently continued in the tradition of surfacing new talent, characters, and series with similar shorts "incubators", including (as of 2015) Oh Yeah! Cartoons (Nickelodeon, 1998), Nicktoons Film Festival (Nickelodeon, 2004), The Meth Minute 39 (Channel Frederator, 2008), Random! Cartoons (Nickelodeon/Nicktoons, 2008), Too Cool! Cartoons (Cartoon Hangover, 2012), and GO! Cartoons (Cartoon Hangover, 2016). Oh Yeah! Cartoons showcased What a Cartoon! alumni (Butch Hartman, Rob Renzetti) and launched several successful Nickelodeon series, including The Fairly OddParents, ChalkZone and My Life as a Teenage Robot. Frederator Studios also launched an animation film festival, Nicktoons Film Festival from 2004 to 2009; only to have The Mighty B! greenlit as a series based on the Super Scout short; though one short from Alex Hirsch would later go on to make Gravity Falls for Disney Channel/Disney XD. The studio launched another animation showcase in 2006, titled Random! Cartoons, which in turn produced Nickelodeon's Fanboy & Chum Chum in 2009, Cartoon Network's Adventure Time in 2010, and Cartoon Hangover's Bravest Warriors in 2012.

A sequel-of-sorts to the What a Cartoon! project, a Cartoon Network project titled The Cartoonstitute, was announced on April 3, 2008. Created by the channel executive Rob Sorcher and headed by The Powerpuff Girls creator Craig McCracken and My Life as a Teenage Robot creator Rob Renzetti, the project was to "establish a think tank and create an environment in which animators can create characters and stories", and also create new possible Cartoon Network series. However, the project was eventually scrapped as a result of the late 2000s recession and only 14 of the 39 planned were completed. Nevertheless, J. G. Quintel's Regular Show short and Peter Browngardt's Secret Mountain Fort Awesome were greenlit to become full series. A recurring character on the show, Uncle Grandpa, would get his own series two years later. The Big Cartoon DataBase cites What a Cartoon! as a "venture combining classic 1940s production methods with the originality, enthusiasm and comedy of the 1990s".

On April 15, 2021, Cartoon Network announced that it debuted a new iteration of Cartoon Cartoons. The lineup of the first nine shorts were announced on November 24, 2021: Accordions Geoffery & Mary Melodica by Louie Zong (of The Ghost and Molly McGee and We Bare Bears), Dang! It's Dracula by Levon Jihanian (of Tig n' Seek), Hungy Ghost by Jesse Moynihan (of Adventure Time), Fruit Stand at the End of the World by Rachel Liu, Off the Menu by Shavonne Cherry (of Ren and Stimpy and The Looney Tunes Show), Harmony in Despair by Andrew Dickman (of Looney Tunes Cartoons), Unravel by Alexis Sugden, Mouthwash Madness by Lisa Vandenberg (of Animaniacs), and Scaredy Cat by J.J. Villard (of King Star King). On June 7, 2022, more Cartoon Cartoons were announced. The next seven shorts include The All-Nimal by Nick Edwards (of Apple & Onion and The Fungies!), Buttons' Gamezone by Fernando Puig (of The Cuphead Show!, Middlemost Post and Tig n' Seek), Tib Tub, We Need You by Sean Godsey and Mike Rosenthal, I Love You Jocelyn by Tracey Laguerre (Art and Animation Director for brands like Google, DreamWorks Animation, BuzzFeed, etc.), Pig in a Wig by Sam Marin (of Regular Show), The Good Boy Report (based on the webcomic of the same name) by Kasey Williams (of Niko and the Sword of Light and Harley Quinn) and Maude Macher and Dom Duck by Kali Fontecchio (of The Looney Tunes Show and Jellystone!). On March 21, 2024, GiAnna Ligammari (of Niko and the Sword of Light and Inside Job) announced a Cartoon Cartoons short ISCREAM created by her. Four days after, the short was announced as being completed. The shorts were showcased in a screening on April 25, 2024.

== List of shorts ==
=== Original show (1995–97) ===
The following is a list of the original shorts produced under Fred Seibert's management for What a Cartoon! by Hanna-Barbera. The shorts are listed in the order that they originally aired.

No.	Series	Title	Created by	Hanna-Barbera	Cartoon Network Studios	Short summary	Original air date
1a	The Powerpuff Girls	"Meat Fuzzy Lumkins"	Craig McCracken	Yes	No	The Powerpuff Girls Blossom (voiced by Cathy Cavadini), Bubbles (voiced by Kath Soucie), and Buttercup (voiced by E.G. Daily) fight to stop the plot of Fuzzy Lumpkins (voiced by Jim Cummings) to turn everything in Townsville into meat. Note 1: This episode was included as a bonus toon on various Cartoon Network Video releases throughout the series run. Note 2: First pilot to The Powerpuff Girls.	February 20, 1995
1b	—N/a	"Dexter's Laboratory" (Note: Simply titled "Dexter's Laboratory" during original airings, but the title "Changes" was added during reruns of Dexter's Laboratory.)	Genndy Tartakovsky	Yes	No	Dee Dee (voiced by Allison Moore) and Dexter (voiced by Christine Cavanaugh) battle turning each other into animals, using Dexter's latest invention. Note 1: First short to become a series after being deemed most popular through a vote held in 1995. Note 2: This episode was nominated for an Emmy. Note 3: First pilot to Dexter's Laboratory.	February 26, 1995
1c	Yuckie Duck	"Short Orders"	Pat Ventura	Yes	No	Yuckie Duck (voiced by Bill Kopp) works as a cook and waiter in a dirty restaurant, and delivers unappealing orders to the demanding customers.	March 5, 1995
2a	Dino	"Stay Out!"	Hanna-Barbera (original character)	Yes	No	The Flintstones' pet Dino (vocal effects provided by Frank Welker) tries to keep the house cat outside for the night while Fred Flintstone (voiced by Henry Corden) is out bowling with Barney Rubble. Note: First spin-off episode to The Flintstones.	March 19, 1995
2b	—N/a	"Johnny Bravo"	Van Partible	Yes	No	Johnny Bravo (voiced by Jeff Bennett) tries to score with a zookeeper girl named Mary (voiced by Soleil Moon Frye) by capturing a runaway gorilla (voiced by Roger Rose). Note: First pilot to Johnny Bravo.	March 26, 1995
2c	Sledgehammer O'Possum	"Out and About"	Patrick Ventura	Yes	No	A trouble-making possum named Sledgehammer (voiced by Faizon Love) frustrates the plans of a dog named Dogg (voiced by Larry B. Scott) to enjoy a nice quiet summer day out.	April 2, 1995
3a	George and Junior	"Look Out Below"	Tex Avery (original character)	Yes	No	Classic duo George (voiced by John Rubinow) and Junior (voiced by Tony Pope) attempt to fix a lightbulb that an angry pigeon (voiced by Rob Paulsen) keeps breaking. Note: This short was a re-imagining of the original George and Junior cartoons.	April 9, 1995
3b	—N/a	"Hard Luck Duck"	William Hanna	Yes	No	After venturing away from the watch of his friend Harley Gator (voiced by Brad Garrett), Hard Luck Duck (voiced by Russi Taylor) is a target of a hungry fox chef (voiced by Jim Cummings) to be cooked. Though the fox's attempts are constantly thwarted by Harley. Note: This short is similar to the classic Yakky Doodle cartoons by William Hanna and Joseph Barbera.	April 16, 1995
3c	Shake & Flick	"Raw Deal in Rome"	Michael Rann, Eugene Mattos, and George Johnson	Yes	No	A flea named Flick has a personal agenda with a local performer, a poodle named Shake, in an anachronistic Rome setting where the two constantly try to one up each other. Note: This short was nominated to be adapted into a series but it lost to Johnny Bravo.	June 18, 1995
4a	The Adventures of Captain Buzz Cheeply	"A Clean Getaway"	Meinert Hansen	Yes	No	Captain Buzz Cheeply (voiced by Richard M. Dumont) and his robot sidekick Slide (voiced by Rick Jones) must escape a planet full of "Blubnoids" (voiced by Paul Zakaib) who have abnormally sized foreheads but small-sized brains whilst trying to do their laundry.	June 25, 1995
4b	O. Ratz with Dave D. Fly	"Rat in a Hot Tin Can"	Jerry Reynolds and Russ Harris	Yes	No	A rat named O. Ratz (voiced by Harvey Korman) and his fly companion Dave D. Fly (voiced by Marvin Kaplan) try to find a place to stay for the night during winter in the city.	July 2, 1995
4c	Pfish and Chip	"Short Pfuse"	Butch Hartman, Michael Rann, and Eugene Mattos	Yes	No	A shark named Pfish (voiced by Robert Picardo) and a short-tempered lynx named Chip (voiced by Butch Hartman) attempt to stop the squeaky-laughing Mad Bomber (voiced by Pat Fraley) while the Chief (voiced by Jeff Bennett) naps.	July 9, 1995
5a	The Fat Cats	"Drip Dry Drips"	Jon McClenahan	Yes	No	Louie (voiced by Ken Hudson Campbell) and Elmo (voiced by Hank Azaria) set a laundry business, expecting to earn some cash. They get a request from the President of the United States (voiced by Doug James), but accidentally destroy his suit.	July 16, 1995
5b	George and Junior	"George and Junior's Christmas Spectacular"	Tex Avery (original character)	Yes	No	Mail carriers George and Junior are forced by a Christmas elf named Steve (voiced by T. K. Carter) to deliver one of the presents of Santa Claus (also voiced by Carter) after they fail to mail in one of his letters. They end up having to contend with a vicious dog.	July 23, 1995
5c	—N/a	"Yoink! of the Yukon"	Don Jurwich, Jerry Eisenberg, and Jim Ryan	Yes	No	The mounted police has its uniforms stolen by a bear named Noof (voiced by Rob Paulsen) in retaliation for his forest friends being skinned of their fur, so Yoink and Sergeant Farnsworth Farflung (both voiced by Paulsen) are sent by the mounted police captain (voiced by Charlie Adler) to retrieve them.	July 30, 1995
6a	Yuckie Duck	"I'm on My Way"	Patrick A. Ventura	Yes	No	Yuckie Duck works as a paramedic, but does more harm than good to his patients.	August 6, 1995
6b	Mina and the Count	"Interlude with a Vampire"	Rob Renzetti	Yes	No	A vampire known as the Count (voiced by Mark Hamill) is forced to play with Mina (voiced by Ashley Johnson) after a mix-up in the schedule with his victims caused by his assistant Igor (voiced by Jeff Bennett). Note: Pilot to the Mina and the Count shorts featured throughout Oh Yeah! Cartoons, making it the only short to appear in both cartoon variety shows.	November 5, 1995
6c	Cow and Chicken	"No Smoking"	David Feiss	Yes	No	The Devil (voiced by Charlie Adler) kidnaps Chicken (Charlie Adler) who must be saved from damnation of smoking (that the Devil tempted him to do) by his sister Cow (Charlie Adler) in her Super Cow form. Note 1: This episode was nominated for an Emmy. Note 2: Pilot to Cow and Chicken.	November 12, 1995
7a	—N/a	"Boid 'n' Woim"	C. Miles Thompson	Yes	No	A worm named Mr. Woim (voiced by Tom Fahn) hitchhikes in the middle of the California desert alongside a bird named Mr. Boid (voiced by C. Miles Thompson). While driving there, Woim crashes Boid's car and they begin to hallucinate which leads to Mr. Boid chasing after Mr. Woim to eat him.	January 1, 1996
7b	Jof	"Help?"	Bruno Bozzetto	Yes	No	A cat named Jof (voiced by Roberto Frattini) who pricks his finger while sewing asks for help at the hospital, but its personnel do more harm to him than good.	January 14, 1996
7c	Podunk Possum	"One Step Beyond"	Joe Orrantia and Elizabeth Stonecypher	No	Yes	A possum (voiced by Denver Pyle) acquires an abandoned farm with three chickens (voiced by Kath Soucie) to lay eggs for him, and has to defend them from a fried chicken titan named Major Portions (voiced by Mayf Nutter) while unaware of a plan by a bunch of aliens.	January 21, 1996
8a	The Powerpuff Girls	"Crime 101"	Craig McCracken	Yes	No	The Powerpuff Girls Blossom, Bubbles, and Buttercup aid the bumbling Amoeba Boys (voiced by Chuck McCann) in becoming able criminals where the demonstration of a bank robbery gets them in trouble with the police. Note: Second pilot to The Powerpuff Girls.	January 28, 1996
8b	—N/a	"Wind-Up Wolf"	William Hanna	Yes	No	The Big Bad Wolf (voiced by Dee Bradley Baker) creates a robot minion wolf (Dee Bradley Baker) to attempt to finally get the Three Little Pigs (voiced by Dee Bradley Baker and Jeannie Elias). Note 1: This was based on a cartoon that Tex Avery originally pitched at Hanna-Barbera. Note 2: William Hanna's final cartoon short. Note 3: Cameos from The Jetsons.	February 4, 1996
8c	—N/a	"Hillbilly Blue"	Michael Ryan	Yes	No	A crawdad named Eustace (voiced by Jeff Bennett) is fed-up with being treated as food and goes with possum pal Mortiche (voiced by Charlie Adler) on a cross-country trip to New Orleans.	February 11, 1996
9a	Courage the Cowardly Dog	"The Chicken from Outer Space"	John R. Dilworth	Yes	No	A cowardly pink dog named Courage (voiced by Howard Hoffman) tries to stop an alien chicken's plans to invade Earth while on his owners' farm. Note 1: This short was nominated for an Oscar. Note 2: Pilot to Courage the Cowardly Dog.	February 18, 1996
9b	Pizza Boy	"No Tip"	Robert Alvarez	Yes	No	Pizza Boy (voiced by Gary Imhoff) must deliver a pizza from his dad Kocoum (voiced by Phil Hayes) to an Eskimo couple (voiced by Brian Cummings and Candi Milo) and their polar bear (voiced by Gregg Berger) that are sick of blubber products to the Arctic Circle safe and sound under five minutes or else he will receive no tip.	February 25, 1996
9c	—N/a	"Gramps"	Mike Ryan and Butch Hartman	Yes	No	Gramps (voiced by Rob Paulsen) tells his grandchildren (voiced by Christine Cavanaugh and Kath Soucie) about his battle against invading aliens (voiced by Charlie Adler and Neil Dickson).	March 3, 1996
10a	Dexter's Laboratory (uncredited)	"The Big Sister"	Genndy Tartakovsky	Yes	No	Dexter has to prevent giantess Dee Dee from attacking the whole city after she eats one of his experimental chocolate chip cookies that were meant for his laboratory rats. Note 1: This episode was nominated for an Emmy. Note 2: Second pilot to Dexter's Laboratory.	March 10, 1996
10b	Bloo's Gang	"Bow-Wow Buccaneers"	Mike Milo and Harry McLaughlin	Yes	No	Bloo (voiced by Mike Milo) and his dog friends Simon and Skully (voiced by Nick Jameson and Mike Milo) sneak out of their respective owners' houses at midnight to set on a pirate adventure in the city and soon end up contending with a group of cats (voiced by Gregg Berger and Frank Welker).	March 17, 1996
10c	Jungle Boy	"Mr. Monkeyman"	Van Partible	No	Yes	Jungle Boy (voiced by Cody Dorkin) is a feral child who lives in the heart of Africa and saves the local animals. Jealous King Raymond (voiced by Michael McKean) attempts to taint the reputation of the hero Jungle Boy after he begins to lose fame. Note: Second pilot to Johnny Bravo.	October 9, 1996
11a	Godfrey & Zeek	"Lost Control"	Jason Butler Rote and Zac Moncrief	No	Yes	A giraffe named Godfrey (voiced by Tom Kenny) and a pig named Zeek (voiced by Rob Paulsen) leave their zoo home and visit a residual water treatment plant to retrieve the remote control they accidentally flushed down the toilet.	October 16, 1996
11b	Tumbleweed Tex	"School Daze"	Robert Alvarez	No	Yes	A Wild West outlaw named Tumbleweed Tex (voiced by Phil Hayes) needs to finish the fourth grade and deal with his obnoxious class rival Little Timmy (voiced by Candi Milo) while contending with his teacher (also voiced by Milo).	October 23, 1996
11c	—N/a	"Buy One, Get One Free"	Charlie Bean, Carey Yost, and Don Shank	No	Yes	In New York City, a man named Reilly (voiced by Roger Rose) gets a cat named Flinch (voiced by Kevin Michael Richardson) to impress a female cat lover named Sofie (voiced by Lala Sloatman) and threatens to harm the cat if he makes a mess of his apartment while he is away. It will not be easy when Sophie leaves Flinch with a feline playmate named Fix (voiced by Greg Eagles) that only wants to party.	October 30, 1996
12a	—N/a	"The Kitchen Casanova"	John McIntyre	No	Yes	A first-time cook named Casanova (voiced by Carlos Alazraqui) is preparing a dinner for his date Doris (voiced by Mary Kay Bergman) while neglecting the feeding of his dog Pudge (vocal effects provided by Frank Welker). Trouble arises with one of the attempts when the wind flips the pages from his cookbook causing a mixture of ingredients.	November 6, 1996
12b	—N/a	"The Ignoramooses"	Mike Milo and Harry McLaughlin	No	Yes	Two moose named Pomeroy (voiced by Dee Bradley Baker) and Sherwood (voiced by Tom Kenny) believe they are going to be adopted by a rich hunter named Ed (voiced by Jeff Bennett) due to tracking collars that a biologist named Jimmy (Jeff Bennett) put on them (they think they are pet collars) and wreak havoc in his mansion.	November 13, 1996
12c	Johnny Bravo (uncredited)	"Johnny Bravo and the Amazon Women"	Van Partible	Yes	No	Johnny Bravo is left stranded in an island filled with beautiful giant Amazon women (voiced by Brenda Vaccaro and B.J. Ward) whose village is protected by an elephant named Christopher (voiced by David Lander). Note: Third pilot to Johnny Bravo.	January 1, 1997
13a	Pfish and Chip	"Blammo the Clown"	Butch Hartman, Michael Rann, and Eugene Mattos	No	Yes	The bomb squad Pfish and Chip face yet another clown bomber named Blammo. It is not easy when they have to watch and protect the chief's teddy bear while the Chief is attending a carnival.	January 8, 1997
13b	—N/a	"Awfully Lucky"	Davis Doi	No	Yes	A greedy guy named Luther (voiced by Jim Cummings) discovers the Paradox Pearl discarded by an old man (voiced by Nick Jameson) which brings him good luck, but not without bad luck consequences. When Luther tries to turn it in to the city museum for ten million dollars, he finds out just how harsh the following bad lucks are.	January 15, 1997
13c	—N/a	"Strange Things"	Mike Wellins	No	Yes	A robot finds a job as a janitor. He must remember the advice from his supervisor Mel (voiced by Ronnie Schell) that if it says "Don't Touch", don't touch. Note: The series' only 3D animated short.	January 22, 1997
14a	—N/a	"Snoot's New Squat"	Jeret Ochi and Victor Ortado	No	Yes	Snoot (voiced by Jeret Ochi), the flea-like alien, finds a new home on a neurotic neat-freak dog Al (voiced by Jeff Bennett) under the orders of his commander (voiced by Derek Webster). Though Snoot does come to Al's aid when he helps to deal with Al's frustrated doctor (voiced by Glenn Shadix).	January 29, 1997
14b	—N/a	"Larry and Steve"	Seth MacFarlane	No	Yes	A dog named Steve (voiced by Seth MacFarlane) is adopted from the pound by dimwit Larry (Seth MacFarlane) who is the only man to understand dog. Steve and lives disaster after disaster when Larry takes him shopping for new furniture. Note: Episode's style developed into MacFarlane's Family Guy.	February 5, 1997
14c	Sledgehammer O'Possum	"What's Goin' on Back There!?"	Patrick A. Ventura	Yes	No	Sledgehammer O'Possum (voiced by T.K. Carter) takes shelter from the cold in a mailbox during the winter season much to the dismay of a mail carrier named Ethel (voiced by Kevyn Brackett) who will stop at nothing to make him leave.	February 12, 1997
15a	The Zoonatiks	"Home Sweet Home"	Paul Parducci, James Giordano, and R.J. Reiley	No	Yes	A bear named Bill (voiced by Paul Parducci), a monkey named Knuckles (voiced by R.J. Reiley), and a snapping turtle named Shelby (voiced by James Giordano) try to enter the all-star Hackensack Zoo after feeling unwanted at the circus while contending with the zoo director Mr. Prescott (voiced by James Giordano) who doesn't want them moving in.	February 19, 1997
15b	Swamp and Tad	"Mission Imfrogable"	John Rice and Achiu So	Yes	No	Two frog guards named Swamp (voiced by Charlie Adler) and Tad (voiced by Jim Cummings) work on Planet Marsh. They are sent by their general (voiced by Jim Cummings) to get a package on Earth for the King (voiced by Charlie Adler) and suffer a delay when a dog (vocal effects provided by Jim Cummings) makes off with it.	February 26, 1997
15c	Dino	"The Great Egg-Scape"	Hanna-Barbera (original character)	Yes	No	After getting fired by the museum scientist (voiced by Nick Jameson) for letting two criminals get away with a giant egg, Dino takes care of a baby dinosaur (vocal effects provided by Russi Taylor) that hatched from the egg that rolled away during the high-speed pursuit and tries to prevent him from growing. Though the baby goes on a rampage when two police officers (voiced by Jameson and Rob Paulsen) raid the Flintstone house upon Dino being accused of harboring the egg. Note: Second and final spin-off episode to The Flintstones.	March 5, 1997
16a	—N/a	"Malcom and Melvin"	Ralph Bakshi	No	Yes	Melvin (voiced by Craig Marin) is an alienated loser until he meets Malcom (Craig Marin), a trumpeter cockroach who has a huge talent. Note: The creator Bakshi disowned both shorts upon release.	November 26, 1997
16b	—N/a	"Tales of Worm Paranoia"	Eddie Fitzgerald	No	Yes	Johnny is a peaceful and forgiving worm (voiced by Patrick Pinney) until a human (Patrick Pinney) steps on him repeatedly. As a result, the worm becomes paranoid and angered at the human race, seeking revenge. Note: Style reminiscent of John Kricfalusi's The Ren & Stimpy Show; he is listed with a "Special Thanks" credit. (Co-animator Bob Jaques had previously worked on The Ren & Stimpy Show.)	November 27, 1997
16c	Malcom and Melvin (uncredited)	"Babe! He... Calls Me"	Ralph Bakshi	No	Yes	Melvin continues as his partnership with Malcom is compromised by the intrusion of an urban superhero (voiced by Ralph Bakshi). Meanwhile, Melvin's mother (voiced by Barbara Rosenblat) aids a criminal after being unable to meet with her son. Note: The creator Bakshi disowned both shorts upon release.	November 28, 1997

=== The Cartoon Cartoon Show (1998–2002) ===
The Cartoon Cartoon Show logo

After What a Cartoon! ended its run in 1997, Fred Seibert left Hanna-Barbera in 1997 to launch Frederator Studios. In 1998, Sam Register, who was Cartoon Network's vice president at the time, took over What a Cartoon!, and two years later, turned them into The Cartoon Cartoon Show. Production of this series was handed over to Cartoon Network Productions. Register would later create Hi Hi Puffy AmiYumi for Cartoon Network in 2004. Two Cartoon Cartoon shorts were produced in 1998 and three in 1999. All Cartoon Cartoon shorts produced between 2000 and 2001 were entered in The Big Pick, a contest to choose the newest Cartoon Cartoon. The shorts premiered on Cartoon Cartoon Fridays in the weeks leading up to "The Big Pick" and the winner was revealed during the actual event. The winners were The Grim Adventures of Billy & Mandy, in 2000, and Codename: Kids Next Door, in 2001.

In 2002, eight new shorts premiered during the Cartoon Cartoon Weekend Summerfest. They did not compete against one another. These were the final Cartoon Cartoon shorts before the brand name was dropped. One short, LowBrow, was given its own series under the name Megas XLR.

Title	Created by	Production company(s)	Original release date
"Kenny and the Chimp: Diseasy Does It! or Chimp-N-Pox"	Mr. Warburton	Hanna-Barbera	November 6, 1998
A boy named Kenny (voiced by Tom Kenny) and his pet chimpanzee Chimpy must watch the disease laboratory run by Professor XXXL (voiced by Frank Welker) while he is away. However, Chimpy causes trouble for Kenny as he follows Professor XXXL's advice to use the Help Me Disease Hotline if he gets infected with any of his diseases. Note: The style of the short and the character Professor XXXL would be used on Codename: Kids Next Door.
"Mike, Lu & Og: Crash Lancelot"	Mikhail Aldashin, Mikhail Shindel, and Charles Swenson	Kinofilm	November 6, 1998
A castaway girl named Mike (voiced by Nika Futterman) asks for native inventor Og (voiced by Dee Bradley Baker) to build a car to get across the island. He also builds a specially improved model for princess Lu (voiced by Nancy Cartwright), which runs too fast for her. Note: Pilot to Mike, Lu & Og.
"King Crab: Space Crustacean"	Bill Wray	Hanna-Barbera	August 21, 1999
King Crab (voiced by Frank Gorshin) is a highly-evolved king crab and captain of his intergalactic space cruiser with crew members like his ward Zesty Relish (voiced by Charlie Adler), Dr. Deli (voiced by Lane Schirmer), Lt. Rock Shrimp (voiced by Billy West), and Jackie Android (Billy West). Relish soon has his body invaded by a life-sucking outer space parasite (Charlie Adler).
"A Day in the Life of Ranger Smith"	John Kricfalusi	Spümcø	September 24, 1999
Ranger Smith (voice of Corey Burton) experiences another torturous day as a park ranger having to deal with Yogi Bear (voice of Greg Burson). Note: Spin-off of The Yogi Bear Show, aired with minimal Cartoon Cartoons branding.
"Boo Boo Runs Wild"	John Kricfalusi	Spümcø	September 24, 1999
Boo-Boo Bear (voice of John Kricfalusi) goes mad after Ranger Smith (voice of Corey Burton) goes too far with his regulations. Note: Spin-off of The Yogi Bear Show, aired with minimal Cartoon Cartoons branding.
"Nikki"	Debra Solomon and Todd Kessler	Sea Monkey Productions	December 14, 1999 (stealth premiere); June 30, 2000
Two friends (both voiced by Allison Keith and Francis Jue) find unusual responses to their on-line postings after they try to cheer up a broken-hearted woman (voiced by Debra Solomon) in the park.
"The Grim Adventures of Billy & Mandy: Meet the Reaper"	Maxwell Atoms	Hanna-Barbera	December 27, 1999 (stealth premiere); June 9, 2000
Billy (voiced by Richard Steven Horvitz) and Mandy (voiced by Grey DeLisle) are paid a visit by the Grim Reaper (voiced by Greg Eagles) when he comes to collect the soul of Billy's hamster, Mr. Snuggles. Mandy then makes a bet with him in the form of a game: if Grim loses, he lets them keep Mr. Snuggles along with becoming their "best friend". Note 1: Winner of Cartoon Network's Big Pick marathon (2000). Note 2: Pilot to The Grim Adventures of Billy & Mandy and Grim & Evil.
"Foe Paws"	Chris Savino	Hanna-Barbera	December 27, 1999 (stealth premiere); July 7, 2000
This cartoon follows the misadventures of an eccentric old woman (voiced by Rhoda Gemignani) who tries to replace her long lost children by dressing up her cat (voiced by Ryan Stiles) and her dog (voiced by Tom Kenny) in human clothes.
"Thrillseeker: Putt 'n' Perish"	Deborah Cone	Hanna-Barbera	December 27, 1999 (stealth premiere); November 3, 2000
A group of thrill seekers named Ashley (voiced by Grey DeLisle), Joe (voiced by Scott Menville), and Otto (voiced by Kevin Michael Richardson) attempt to conquer the world's most dangerous golf course called "Putt & Perish".
"Whatever Happened to Robot Jones?"	Greg Miller	Hanna-Barbera	June 16, 2000
Robot Jones (voice provided by MacInTalk Junior) learns that he has been put into a human public school that he must now attend. Note 1: Pilot to Whatever Happened to... Robot Jones?. Note 2: In the Cartoon Network's Big Pick marathon (2000), the pilot had lost at 2nd place.
"Trevor!: Journey to Sector 5-G"	Adam Shaheen and Jeff Rockburn	Cuppa Coffee Studios	June 23, 2000
This cartoon follows the wild world of Trevor Braithwaite (voiced by Susan Roman) whose doodles dance right off the page.
"Prickles the Cactus"	Denis Morella	Curious Pictures	July 14, 2000
Its plot follows the mishaps of a clumsy water-phobic cactus (voiced by Monica Lee Gradischek) who helps save her family from a deadly drought at Cyclone Ranch. Note: This pilot was later adapted to an interactive short for Cartoon Network Video's anthology series Web Premiere Toons.
"Lucky Lydia: Club Lydia"	Arthur Filloy and Bob Camp	FilmGraphics Entertainment; Frames Animation•Illustration; Bob Camp Productions, Inc.	July 21, 2000
This cartoon follows the unwittingly lucky Lydia Lucas (voiced by Laraine Newman) who is raised by half-crazy parents and narrowly misses her demise at the hands of the Baxter Boys again and again.
"Longhair and Doubledome: Good Wheel Hunting"	Gavrilo Gnatovich	Knock-Knock Cartoons Ltd., LLC	July 28, 2000
This cartoon follows two philosophical cavemen named Longhair (voiced by Daniel Davis) and Doubledome (voiced by Jess Harnell) who just don't fit into their prehistoric surroundings as the work on inventing the wheel. Note: In the Cartoon Network's Big Pick marathon (2000), the pilot had lost at 3rd place.
"Lost Cat"	David Feiss	David Feiss, Inc.	August 4, 2000
A homeless purple cat (voiced by Phil LaMarr) attempts to scam his way into cozy new digs by passing himself off as someone else's lost cat.
"Uncle Gus: For the Love of Monkeys"	Lincoln Peirce	Hanna-Barbera	August 11, 2000
This cartoon follows the journey of a wily unemployed geezer (voiced by Stuart Pankin) and his rag-tailed bunch of friends as they travel to the zoo to reunite Uncle Gus with his AWOL fiancée (voiced by Josephine Bradley).
"Sheep in the Big City: In the Baa-ginning"	Mo Willems	Curious Pictures	August 18, 2000
Sheep (vocal effects provided by Kevin Seal) leaves the farm of Farmer John (voiced by James Godwin) in pursuit of a happy life in the city while being pursued by General Specific (Kevin Seal). Note: Pilot to Sheep in the Big City.
"Captain Sturdy: Back in Action!"	William Waldner, Ashley Postlewaite, and Darrell Van Citters	Renegade Animation	June 8, 2001
The long-retired Captain Sturdy (voiced by Corey Burton) must return to action when the Union of Super Heroes cancels his pension. Upon returning to duty, he discovers that the organization has lost sight of what it means to be a superhero and has become more concerned with political correctness and marketing deals than saving the world from the evil clutches of Moid.
"Yee Hah & Doo Dah: Bronco Breakin' Boots"	Kenny Duggan	Pitch Production	June 15, 2001
A cowboy named Yee Hah (voiced by Rafael Ferrer) and his horse named Doo Dah (voiced by Thomas Haden Church), reside in Manhattan's Central Park. Yee Hah enjoys the city life until he discovers that the city pavement is giving him a dreadful blister. Much to Doo Dah's dismay, he decides to stop walking and ride his horse everywhere, thereby cramping Doo Dah's power-lunching lifestyle. Eventually, Doo Dah finds the real culprit behind Yee Hah's sore feet: the branding iron, tractor, etc. that Yee Hah has been hiding in his boots.
"IMP, Inc."	Chris Reccardi and Charlie Bean	Cartoon Network Studios	June 22, 2001
Travelling in an orbiting meteor, three Imps are up for review and are offered the opportunity to help a poor farm couple by granting them their wish for desperately needed rain to help their crops. They manage to deliver rain, but their hopes for promotion come crashing down when their meteor smashes the couple's crops.
"My Freaky Family: Welcome to My World"	John McIntyre	Cartoon Network Studios	June 29, 2001
It's the first day of school for Nadine (voiced by Kath Soucie), a significant historical event considered by her mother to be one of many "milestone days", which must be documented with a photo much to the dismay of her father (voiced by Jeff Bennett) and the support of her grandmother (voiced by Billie Hayes). She manages to make it onto the school bus without being photographed, but her "freaky" family grabs the camera and jumps on the family multi-seater bicycle for a mortifying chase to catch up with her. Note: In the Cartoon Network's Big Pick marathon (2001), the pilot had lost at 3rd place.
"Major Flake: Soggy Sale"	Adam Cohen and Casper Kelly	Kurtz + Friends Animation	July 6, 2001
Major Flake (voiced by Rob Paulsen), a frenetic French cereal mascot, and his grim sidekick Sparkles (voiced by Jeff Bennett) must find a way to sell their rather unappealing Major Flake cereal before their boss Sylvia Soggy (voiced by Becky Bonar) pulls the breakfast treat from store shelves. During this time, they meet a successful cereal mascot named King Sweet (voiced by Jess Harnell) which later gives Sparkles an idea after every attempt fails.
"Utica Cartoon: Hotdog Champeen"	Fran Krause and Will Krause	Animation Cowboys	July 13, 2001
When Dan Bear (voiced by Jesse Schmal) and Micah Monkey (voiced by Fran Krause) learn that they can get free hot dogs by beating the current hot dog eating record at their local diner, they are up for the challenge. Dan Bear reigns as hot dog champ by consuming loads of free hot dogs, continually beating his own record. For awhile, he enjoys the free franks until beating the record becomes too much even for him.
"Codename: Kids Next Door — No P in the OOL"	Mr. Warburton	Cartoon Network Studios	July 20, 2001
When the villainous Mr. Wink and Mr. Fibb (voiced by Tom Kenny and Dee Bradley Baker) extend the adult swimtime to extreme lengths at the neighborhood pool during their lifeguard gig, the Kids Next Door members Numbuh 1 (voiced by Benjamin Diskin), Numbuh 2 (Benjamin Diskin), Numbuh 3 (voiced by Lauren Tom), Numbuh 4 (Dee Bradley Baker), and Numbuh 5 (voiced by Cree Summer) plan to strike back with vengeance. Note 1: Winner of Cartoon Network's Big Pick marathon (2001). Note 2: Pilot for Codename: Kids Next Door.
"Swaroop: Bovine Bliss"	Mike Milo and Atul N. Rao	Warner Bros. Television Animation	July 27, 2001
Swaroop (voiced by Atul N. Rao) and his family (voiced by Veena Bidasha, Brian George, Nick Jaine, and Aashna Patel) are trying to assimilate their Indian heritage with modern American culture. The differences become glaringly apparent when their neighbor Steve (voiced by Quinton Flynn) brings home a cow (vocal effects provided by Frank Welker) to throw on the barbecue. Swaroop decides to hide the sacred cow before the neighbors can cook it for dinner.
"Ferret and Parrot"	Scott Morse	Cartoon Network Studios	August 3, 2001
A ferret (voiced by Mark Hamill) and a parrot (voiced by J. Grant Albrecht) fight for the affection of a comic strip character. Meanwhile, their owner tries to get rid of ants that have infested the house.
"A Kitty Bobo Show: Cellphones"	Kevin Kaliher and Meg Dunn	Cartoon Network Studios	August 17, 2001
Kitty Bobo (voiced by Dante Basco) wants to prove that he is cool by getting a cell phone. Unfortunately, he doesn't seem to be receiving many important calls, thereby reducing his cool factor, so he begins to fake incoming calls. It's only a matter of time before everyone catches on to the farce. Note: In the Cartoon Network's Big Pick marathon (2001), the pilot had lost at 2nd place.
"Uncle Gus: Not So Fast!"	Lincoln Peirce	Red Sky Brand	November 23, 2001
In the second Uncle Gus short, Gus enters his loyal horse Flapjack (voiced by Dave Thomas) in a horse race to win a bet with mysterious paperboy Ali Ali (voiced by Rob Paulsen).
"Commander Cork: Space Ranger"	Mike Bell	Cartoon Network Studios	August 23, 2002
Commander Cork (voiced by Mike Bell) is an enthusiastic and overzealous, though not very bright, do-gooder. When he meets Peggy and Petey Paddle (voiced by Kath Soucie and Debi Derryberry), a brother and sister duo who share a fascination with outer space, he decides to bring them with him on his wacky space adventures.
"LowBrow: Test Drive"	Jody Schaeffer and George Krstic	Cartoon Network Studios	August 23, 2002
During a routine trip to the garbage dump, suburban misfit Coop (voiced by David DeLuise) discovers an advanced robot from the future. Coop brings the treasure home and retools it to suit his modern-day slacker needs. Note: Pilot to Megas XLR.
"Longhair and Doubledome: Where There's Smoke... There's Bob!"	Gavrilo Gnatovich	Knock-Knock Cartoons Ltd., LLC	August 23, 2002
In their second animated cartoon outing, Longhair and Doubledome discover fire. Having never before seen fire, Doubledome concludes that the blaze must be his son Bob.
"Jeffrey Cat: Claw and Order — All Dogs Don't Go to Heaven"	Mark O'Hare	Cartoon Network Studios	August 23, 2002
Jeffrey Cat (voiced by Diedrich Bader) has never met a crime he couldn't lick. A surge in the pet population raises the need for a pet investigator. Jeffrey Cat, the sergeant on all pet-related cases, makes it his mission to safeguard the rights of all of the pets in the community. When a friendly dog (voiced by Steve Mackall) is accused of attacking a neighbor, Jeffrey Cat smells a rat.
"Fungus Among Us"	Wes Archer	Rough Draft Studios, Inc.	August 23, 2002
Keeping clean is a dirty business as the animated mascots (voiced by Roz Baker, John DiMaggio, and Phil LaMarr) from cleaning product commercials well know. "Fungus Among Us" follows the trials and tribulations of the fungus who must coexist with the cleaning agents that have been created to destroy them.
"Colin Versus the World: Mr. Lounge Lizard"	Stu Gamble	Square Centre Pictures Limited; Varga Budapest; Cartoon Network Europe	August 23, 2002
Colin (voiced by Lewis MacLeod) is a color-blind chameleon whose life is full of mishaps and blunders. While working as a shelf stocker at Cheapway's Supermarket, Colin passes the days with dreams of becoming a Lounge Lizard in Las Vegas.
"Maktar"	Gavrilo Gnatovich	Knock-Knock Cartoons Ltd., LLC	August 23, 2002
Slashing through our gassy universe, hurtling through our own Milky Way, an invader from the far reaches of Space comes knocking upon our atmospheric door. Sent by Zen (voiced by Kevin Michael Richardson) and his Space Council of Planet Q-8, Maktar is on a mission to conquer Earth. But, Maktar, a sniveling middle manager and galactic pushover, couldn't invade someone's privacy let alone conquer our Great Blue Planet.
"Bagboy!"	John Mathot and Ken Segall	Cartoon Network Studios	August 23, 2002
Parker (voiced by Kurt Long) is a typical 14-year-old with the usual adolescent trials, except when he is a Bagboy. Carefully selected by the elite intergalactic council, known as the Bagi, Parker moonlights as a powerful superhero.

=== Cartoon Cartoon segments ===
From 2000 to 2003, The Cartoon Cartoon Show featured new episodes and reruns of the full-series Cartoon Cartoons (which were introduced in 2002 for the primetime hours), interspersed with premieres and reruns of the Cartoon Cartoon pilot shorts (some of which were retconned WAC! shorts). From 2005 to 2008, the block was revived, this time dropping the pilot shorts.

Episodes from each show were anthologized into 7 and 11-minute segments. This is a list of shows that were presented on the block:

- Dexter's Laboratory (2002–2003; 2005–2008)
- Johnny Bravo (2002–2003; 2005–2008)
- The Powerpuff Girls (2002–2003; 2005–2008)
- Cow and Chicken (2002–2003; 2005–2008)
- I Am Weasel (2002–2003; 2005–2006)
- Time Squad (2002–2003)
- Grim & Evil (2002–2003)
- Whatever Happened to... Robot Jones? (2002–2003; 2005–2006)
- The Grim Adventures of Billy & Mandy (2006–2008)
- Evil Con Carne (2005–2008)
- Foster's Home for Imaginary Friends (2006–2008)
- Hi Hi Puffy AmiYumi (2006)
- Camp Lazlo (2006–2008)
- My Gym Partner's a Monkey (2006–2008)
- Squirrel Boy (2006–2008)
- Ed, Edd n Eddy (2002–2003; 2005–2008)
- Mike, Lu & Og (2002–2003)
- Courage the Cowardly Dog (2002–2003; 2005–2008)
- Codename: Kids Next Door (2006–2008)

== See also ==
- KaBlam! on Nickelodeon
- Oh Yeah! Cartoons on Nickelodeon
- Random! Cartoons on Nicktoons Network
- Shorty McShorts' Shorts – a Disney Channel Original Series of shorts on Disney Channel
- Raw Toonage – created by Disney and originally aired as part of CBS's Saturday Morning Line-up
- The Cartoonstitute – a cancelled spiritual successor that would have continued the What a Cartoon! format
- Liquid Television on MTV
- Cartoon Sushi on MTV
