= Bob Thomas (actor) =

American actor

Bob Thomas (born March 1, 1954, in Appalachia, Virginia) is a radio personality, actor, and writer. He was one of the top radio announcers in Knoxville, Tennessee, for 25 years. As an actor, he has appeared in many films and hundreds of commercials. He wrote two episodes of the popular TV show Lizzie McGuire. In 2004, his voice was heard as "Slammin' Sammy" in the film Friday Night Lights.

== Personal life ==
He is the father of actor Jake Thomas, who appeared on Lizzie McGuire.
