= Hard Luck Duck =

- Title card
- Created by: William Hanna
- Written by: William Hanna
- Directed by: William Hanna
- Country of origin: United States
- Original language: English

Production
- Executive producer: Buzz Potamkin
- Running time: 7 minutes
- Production company: Hanna-Barbera Cartoons

Original release
- Network: Cartoon Network
- Release: April 16, 1995

Related
- What a Cartoon!

Hard Luck Duck is a What a Cartoon! animated cartoon directed by William Hanna, produced by Hanna-Barbera Cartoons, and broadcast as a part of World Premiere Toons on Cartoon Network on April 16, 1995. The cartoon involves Hard Luck Duck (Russi Taylor), after venturing away from Harley Gator (Brad Garrett)'s watch, is a hungry fox (Jim Cummings)'s target to be cooked.

Although he was a producer on many Hanna-Barbera titles until his death on March 22, 2001, Hard Luck Duck is notable for being, with fellow What a Cartoon! short Wind-Up Wolf, the last cartoons written and directed by William Hanna, whose career began in the Golden Age of American animation at Metro-Goldwyn-Mayer (MGM) with the short To Spring (1936) and his later Tom and Jerry series.

== Plot ==
A villainous fox wants to put Hard Luck Duck on his menu. Hard Luck Duck has a friend/bodyguard, an alligator named Harley. Harley routinely thwarts the fox's efforts to make a meal of the duck.

== Production ==
Fred Seibert became president of Hanna-Barbera Cartoons in 1992 and helped guide the struggling animation studio into its greatest output in years with shows like 2 Stupid Dogs and SWAT Kats: The Radical Squadron. Seibert wanted the studio to produce short cartoons, in the vein of the Golden age of American animation. Although a project consisting of 48 shorts would cost twice as much as a normal series, Seibert's pitch to Cartoon Network involved promising 48 chances to "succeed or fail," opened up possibilities for new original programming, and offered several new shorts to the thousands already present in the Turner Entertainment Co. library. According to Seibert, quality did not matter much to the cable operators distributing the struggling network, they were more interested in promising new programs.

Seibert's idea for the project was influenced heavily by Looney Tunes. Hanna, with partner Joe Barbera, as well as veteran animator Friz Freleng, taught Seibert how the shorts of the Golden Age of American animation were produced. As was the custom in live action film and television, the company did not pay each creator for the storyboard submitted and pitched. For the first time in the studio's history, individual creators could retain their rights, and earn royalties on their creations. Hard Luck Duck was written and pitched by Hanna, and immediately entered production.

== Release ==
Hard Luck Duck premiered Sunday, April 16, 1995 as a stand-alone cartoon. The cartoon preceded Cartoon Network's Sunday night movie block, Mr. Spim's Cartoon Theatre.
