= Debra Solomon =

- Occupations: Animator, director, illustrator, author, producer
- Known for: Lizzie McGuire, Everybody's Pregnant, My Kingdom, Mrs. Matisse
- Website: debrasolomon.com

Debra Solomon is an American filmmaker, animator, illustrator, and author known best for being the animation supervisor and creator of the animated Lizzie from the Disney Channel show Lizzie McGuire (2001–2003). She has made a variety of short films, animated sketches, and title sequences since 1994. Many of her films focus on the struggles of womanhood and emphasizing the female identity with empowering images.

== Biography ==
Solomon's interest in film and animation began when she studied illustration at Pratt University. Once she completed her studies, Solomon became a freelance illustrator and later an animator. While drafting her first production, Mrs. Matisse (1994), Solomon continued to illustrate and produced several books.

Solomon has also curated festival programs at the ASIFA-East Animation Festival where she has presented her work. She is a board member for the ASIFA-East, as well as a member of the British Academy of Film and Television Arts and New York Women in Film and Television.

== Career ==
Solomon began her career as an animator with her debut short film Mrs. Matisse (1994). Everybody's Pregnant (1998) was Solomon's next film, cited by Solomon as the film that allowed her to find her artistic voice. Many of her films are animated musicals, with themes of turning bad situations into humorous ones. Solomon writes and performs original music for her productions.

Solomon contributed to the television show Lizzie McGuire (2001–2004), designing the animated counterpart of the show's title character. Solomon is credited as the creator and animation supervisor for the animated representation of Lizzie throughout the show.

After working for Disney, Solomon composed independent films over multiple years. These films were edited together as a 30-minute special on HBO titled Getting Over Him in 8 Songs or Less (2010). Solomon's most recent film is My Kingdom (2014), a short film about personal space and finding comfort in crowded areas of a busy city.

== Filmography ==
- Mrs. Matisse (1994)
- Everybody's Pregnant (1997)
- The Parable of the Clown (1998)
- The Cartoon Cartoon Show (TV series) (1999)
- Nikki (2000)
- Private Eye Princess (2001)
- Lizzie McGuire (TV series) (2001–2004)
- The Lizzie McGuire Movie (2003)
- Super Lambert (2004)
- Get Out the Women's Vote (2004)
- The Blind Men and the Elephant (2004)
- Stevie Sanchez (2005)
- I Wanna Know Everyone in my Building (2007)
- Teach Me to Be a Woman (2008)
- Drugstore (2009)
- Getting Over Him in Eight Songs or Less (2010)
- My Kingdom (2014)

== Awards and nominations ==
Year	Presenter	Award	Film
1994	Annecy Film Festival	Best Sound Track	Mrs. Matisse
1994	Giovani Leoni Prize	Special Jury Award	Mrs. Matisse
1995	ASIFA-East	Best Entry	Mrs. Matisse
1997	ASIFA-East	Animation Award for Best Commercial Film	The Parable of the Clown
1998	World Animation Festival	Special Jury Award	Everybody's Pregnant
1998	Saint Barbara International Film Festival	The Bruce Corwin Award for Best Animated Short	Everybody's Pregnant
1998	Aspen Short Film Festival	Special Jury Award	Everybody's Pregnant
1998	New Haven Film Festival	First Place Audience Award	Everybody's Pregnant
1998	Sydney Film Festival	First Place Short Film Category	Everybody's Pregnant
1998	Palm Springs Film Festival	First Place Audience Award	Everybody's Pregnant
1998	Russian Film Festival	Animation Recognition Award	Everybody's Pregnant
1998	I Castelli Animati	Special Jury Award	Everybody's Pregnant
1998	New York Shorts Film Festival	Best Animated Short Film	Everybody's Pregnant
1998	Greece International Film Festival	Best Film - Dionysus Award	Everybody's Pregnant
1998	ASIFA-East	Best Entry in Commercial Films	The Parable of the Clown
2004	ASIFA-East	Animation Award - Best Commercial Film	The Blind Men and the Elephant
2014	Woodstock Film Festival	NY Best Animated Short	My Kingdom
