= Lizzie McGuire =

American teen comedy television series

- Genre: Teen sitcom
- Created by: Terri Minsky
- Showrunner: Terri Minsky
- Starring: Hilary Duff; Lalaine; Adam Lamberg; Jake Thomas; Hallie Todd; Robert Carradine
- Theme music composer: Elliot Lurie
- Opening theme: "Lizzie McGuire Theme"
- Ending theme: "Lizzie McGuire Theme" (instrumental)
- Composer: Sam Winans
- Country of origin: United States
- Original language: English
- No. of seasons: 2
- No. of episodes: 65 (list of episodes)

Production
- Executive producers: Stan Rogow; Susan Estelle Jansen; Terri Minsky; Rachel Winter
- Producer: Jill Danton
- Camera setup: Single-camera
- Running time: 22–24 minutes
- Production companies: Stan Rogow Productions; ABC Cable Networks Group (Note: Known as Disney Channel, Inc. until "When Moms Attack")

Original release
- Network: Disney Channel
- Release: January 12, 2001 – February 14, 2004

Lizzie McGuire is an American teen sitcom created by Terri Minsky that premiered on Disney Channel on January 12, 2001. The series stars Hilary Duff as the titular character who learns to navigate the personal and social issues of her teenage years. Duff also voices an animated version of Lizzie that performs soliloquies to express the character's inner thoughts and emotions. The series also stars Lalaine, Adam Lamberg, Jake Thomas, Hallie Todd, and Robert Carradine. The series concluded on February 14, 2004, after a total of 65 episodes were produced. A feature film based on the series, The Lizzie McGuire Movie, was released in 2003.

The series was nominated for two Emmy Awards in 2003 and 2004 for Outstanding Children's Program. The pilot received a nomination at the Writers Guild of America Awards for Best Children's Script. The series also received various awards and nominations at the Nickelodeon Kids' Choice Awards from 2002 to 2005. Television critics acknowledged the innocent nature of the series, and the appeal of the writing towards adolescents.

A revival series was announced in August 2019 to be entering production for Disney+, with Duff reprising her role and Minsky returning as showrunner, but Minsky later departed from the role. Lamberg, Thomas, Todd and Carradine were also attached to return to the series in their original roles. The series began production in association with Disney Channel, but entered a hiatus after Minsky's departure and did not resume; the revival was officially canceled in December 2020.

== Premise ==
The series follows Lizzie McGuire, a 13-year-old girl who faces the personal and social issues of adolescence. She attends junior high alongside her best friends Miranda and Gordo. Episodes depict Lizzie's transition into adolescence at home and school, including the friends' rivalry with their classmate Kate, and affections for Ethan. Lizzie tries to develop her own identity, but is also attracted to the idea of popularity at school and longs for social acceptance by her peers. She has a close relationship with her family: her mother, Jo; her father, Sam; and her younger brother, Matt. Lizzie's thoughts and emotions are conveyed sporadically in the episodes through her animated persona, who sometimes speaks to the audience.

== Characters ==
=== Main ===
- Hilary Duff as Lizzie McGuire, a shy and clumsy girl who tries to find her place in the world. Her inner thoughts and emotions are expressed through the soliloquies of an animated version of herself.
- Lalaine as Miranda Sanchez, Lizzie's confident best friend, who enjoys singing and dreams of being a musician
- Adam Lamberg as David "Gordo" Gordon, Lizzie's childhood best friend, who has a passion for filmmaking and playing hacky sack. He later becomes attracted to Lizzie.
- Jake Thomas as Matt McGuire, Lizzie's younger brother, who regularly develops schemes to create trouble around the house. He and Lizzie bicker but still care deeply about each other.
- Hallie Todd as Jo McGuire, Lizzie's mother, who sometimes struggles with the pressure of raising a teenager
- Robert Carradine as Sam McGuire, Lizzie's father, who sometimes struggles with the pressure of raising a teenager and is a bit slow-minded

=== Recurring ===
- Ashlie Brillault as Kate Sanders, a popular girl at school who was formerly the best friend of Lizzie and Miranda; she is now their frenemy
- Clayton Snyder as Ethan Craft, who is athletic, friendly and popular, and whom Lizzie, Miranda, and Kate hope to date
- Kyle Downes as Larry Tudgeman III, an outcast at school who is fond of Miranda
- Davida Williams as Claire Miller, Kate's new best friend who is jealous of the friendship Kate had with Lizzie and Miranda
- Christian Copelin as Lanny Onasis, Matt's best friend, who does not speak
- Carly Schroeder as Melina Bianco, Matt's best friend, who likes to create trouble for him
- Arvie Lowe Jr. as Mr. Dig, Lizzie's laid-back substitute teacher whom she perceives as cool
- Rachel Snow as Veruca Albano, Lizzie's geeky classmate
- Haylie Duff as Amy Sanders, Kate's older cousin
- Daniel Escobar as Mr. Escobar, a drama teacher

== Episodes ==
| Season | Episodes | Originally released | |
| Season | Episodes | First released | Last released |
|---|---|---|---|
| 1 | 31 | January 12, 2001 | January 18, 2002 |
| 2 | 34 | February 8, 2002 | February 14, 2004 |
| Film | | May 2, 2003 | |

== Production ==
=== Development ===
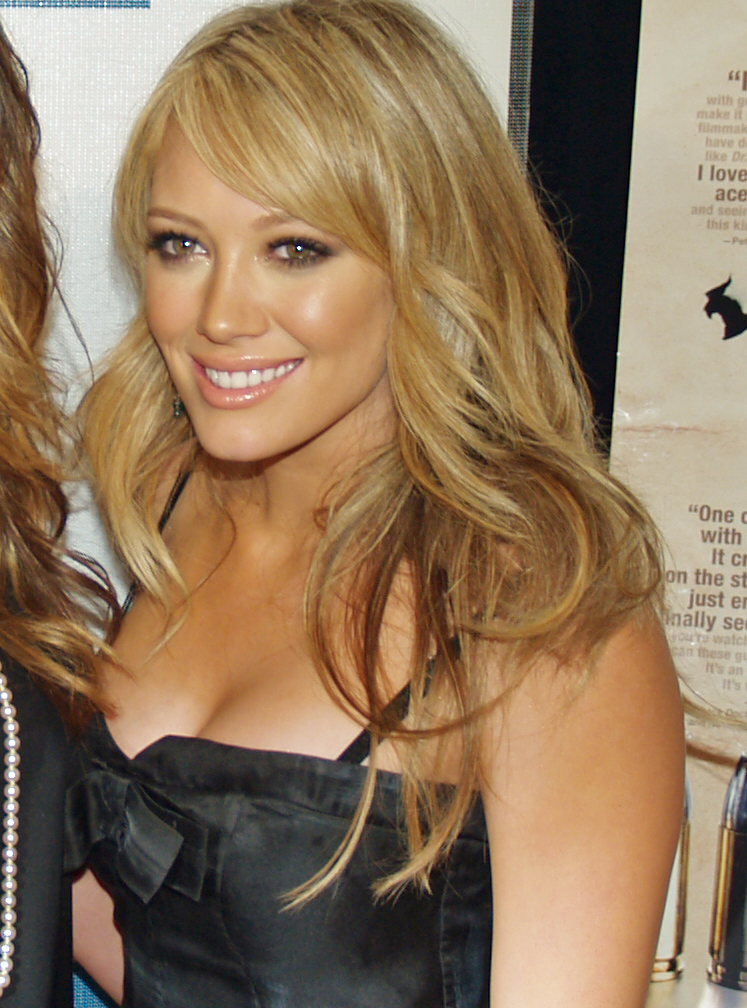
Hilary Duff, pictured in 2009, serves as the program's central focus during its two-season run.

In 2000, Hilary Duff was asked to audition for a series on Disney Channel. Created by Terri Minsky, the series was known by the working title What's Lizzie Thinking? throughout development. The series was later retitled Lizzie McGuire, and Duff successfully auditioned for the title character of Lizzie, who was described as a regular teenager. The premise for the series was based on a script previously written by Minsky, which featured the main character's inner thoughts and emotions as narration. Producer Stan Rogow conceived a high-concept version of the script in which an animated version of the character would be featured to convey these thoughts. This concept became known the "animated Lizzie" persona, and was also voiced by Duff. The animation was originally envisioned as a talking head in the corner of the screen. Rogow stated that the visual design of the show was inspired by the film Run Lola Run.

Independent animator Debra Solomon designed the animated version of Lizzie, based on Duff's appearance on her audition tape. Rather than drawing a mere caricature of Duff, she tried to capture the actress's essence by giving Lizzie's alter ego a more "hip" look: cropped shirts with trim pants and high flip-flops. New York's Tapehouse Toons produced the animation along with Kratky Studios. The drawings were digitally inked and painted using the Animo 3.1 software and then composited into the live-action footage at Disney's Los Angeles studio. Due to the low budget given by Disney, there are only two minutes of animated Lizzie in each episode.

In July 2001, a second season of 22 episodes were ordered, to begin production in September and air in 2002. The first episode filmed, "Pool Party", aired as the fourth episode; production for the rest of the first season commenced around six months later. Lalaine's character Miranda did not appear in the last 6 episodes filmed for the second season, or The Lizzie McGuire Movie, due to Lalaine leaving the series early to work on other projects such as You Wish!. According to Ashley Spencer's 2024 book Disney High: The Untold Story of the Rise and Fall of Disney Channel's Tween Empire, Lalaine and Duff had a "falling-out (that was) beyond repair" in the final stretch of filming of the television series, which led to her being let go early from her contract. Lizzie McGuire casting director Robin Lippin said, "I don't believe that Hilary wanted her to be part of the movie. It probably would have been uncomfortable for both of them."

Filming of the movie and series concluded in December 2002 after 65 episodes were produced, a standard limit for Disney Channel's series.

=== Canceled spin-offs ===
In May 2003, it was revealed that Lizzie McGuire would end production due to contract disagreements between Duff and Disney. The company was interested in transitioning the program into a high school-centered series for ABC and expanding the franchise with a further film, while Duff was receiving offers for lucrative roles with other studios. After the series ended its original run, Disney Channel also considered producing an animated version of the series. In November 2004, a pilot for an intended spin-off was ordered, which was to center on Miranda's younger sister Stevie Sanchez and her Latino family. Lalaine returned to film the pilot, after having been released from her Lizzie McGuire contract six episodes early due to feuding with Duff. The new series would follow the 12-year-old central character, who was played in the pilot by Selena Gomez, and would also feature an animated version of the character like Lizzie. It was to star Lalaine, and be produced by Minsky and Rogow. The pilot was produced in 2005, but the series was not picked up in favor of Hannah Montana. The pilot was described as a "real downer." The pilot featured the use of the song "Everybody Hurts" by R.E.M., about fifteen minutes in, "and it fit perfectly," Rogow said.

=== Canceled revival ===
Logo for the cancelled revival.

In December 2018, Duff stated that there had been discussions about reviving the series. On August 23, 2019, it was announced at the D23 Expo that Disney was developing a revival television series of Lizzie McGuire. The series was revealed to be in production for exclusive distribution on the Disney+ streaming service, with Duff reprising her role as the title character; the original series creator, Terri Minsky, planned to serve as the revival's showrunner. The sequel series would have centered on Lizzie at the age of thirty, navigating life working as an apprentice to an interior decorator. She would be living in an apartment in Brooklyn, New York City, engaged to a man who owns a restaurant in SoHo, Manhattan. When Lizzie discovers her fiancé cheating on her, she returns home to Los Angeles. The animated alter ego of Lizzie would also have appeared in the series. The series was to be produced by Salty Pictures in association with Disney Channel as part of an overall deal with Minsky. Duff was to serve as an executive producer, alongside Rachel Winter, and co-executive producer Ranada Shepard. In October 2019, it was announced that Thomas, Todd and Carradine would also return to the series, reprising their roles as Matt, Jo and Sam McGuire respectively. It was later announced that Lamberg would be reprising his role as Gordo and Federico Dordei would be joining the cast as new character Dominic Shaw. Production on the sequel series began on October 29, 2019, on location in Washington Square Park in New York. Further filming for the series would have taken place in Los Angeles.

Minsky departed as the showrunner of the revival in January 2020 after the first two episodes of the series had been filmed, due to creative differences with Disney. Production of the series was placed on a hiatus. In February 2020, Duff hinted on social media that production had stopped because the series was not thought "family-friendly" enough by Disney+ executives; Disney reaffirmed that the development of the series was ongoing. Duff later posted a statement publicly pleading for Disney+ to move the series to Hulu as had been done with Love, Victor and High Fidelity, stating that it would allow the series to fully represent the life of a thirty-year-old without the constraints of a "family friendly" classification. In April 2020, it was reported in that development was still ongoing, however, in December 2020, Duff announced that the revival was officially canceled. In January 2024, one of the show's writers revealed some of the storylines from the show, and also speculated that Disney had issues with the suggestion that Lizzie had sex with her childhood love interest Ethan.

== Release ==
=== United States ===
The series premiered on Disney Channel on January 12, 2001, as a special sneak preview, following the premiere of the film Zenon: The Zequel. The series officially premiered on January 19, 2001. Lizzie McGuire was scheduled to begin airing in reruns on ABC as part of Disney's One Saturday Morning on September 15, 2001. On September 14, 2002, the series began airing on the rebranded ABC Kids programming block.

In 2006, Superstation WGN acquired the rights to Even Stevens and Lizzie McGuire.

=== Internationally ===
Outside the United States and Canada, the series' distribution, merchandising, and home media rights were held by Egmont Imagination, the children's entertainment division of Danish-based Egmont Group which had co-financed the show's production with Disney. In May 2001, Egmont pre-sold pay-TV rights to the series to Disney Channel's international networks, with Disney gaining a one-year window on the series. Free-TV pre-sales occurred in December of that year, with Egmont pre-selling the rights to broadcasters such as the BBC (UK), ZDF (Germany), and France 2 (France).

Following the closure of the division by Egmont, the company sold its catalogue to Dutch-based Telescreen, who began to distribute the series themselves.

== Other media ==
=== Film ===
Walt Disney Pictures released a film based on the series, The Lizzie McGuire Movie, on May 2, 2003, in the United States. Set after the conclusion of the series and her junior high graduation, the film follows Lizzie and her classmates on a school trip to Rome, Italy. It earned $42.7 million at the U.S. box office and $12.8 million internationally, for a total of $55.6 million worldwide. The film received mixed reviews from critics, who found it superficial, but thought the show's fans would enjoy it.

=== Merchandising ===
Throughout the early 2000s, the series' popularity led Disney to release merchandise, including a series of books and comics, a Lizzie McGuire character doll, a bedroom set, and board games. Disney Interactive published three video games for the Game Boy Advance, including: Lizzie McGuire: On the Go! in 2003, Lizzie McGuire 2: Lizzie Diaries in 2004, and Lizzie McGuire 3: Homecoming Havoc in 2005. Toys were also released through a partnership with McDonald's in 2004. Fortune estimated in 2003 that Lizzie McGuire merchandise had earned nearly $100 million. Two soundtracks for the series were produced, Lizzie McGuire and Lizzie McGuire Total Party!

== Reception ==
=== Critical response ===
On Rotten Tomatoes, the first season of Lizzie McGuire has an approval rating of 80% based on reviews from 5 critics, while the second season has an approval rating of 100% based on reviews from 5 critics. Common Sense Media claimed that the series was relatable for both boys and girls, and described its representation of friendship as realistic. Reviewing the series premiere in 2001, Laura Fries of Variety called the program "good-natured", and praised the writers' ability to include adolescent vernacular and pop culture references. A review on the DVDizzy blog called early episodes "clever, funny, and pretty sincere", but suggested that the show later suffered from a creative decline in favor of more celebrity guest appearances. A DVD review by Dove.org in 2003 called the series "wholesome", and noted its real-world lessons. Susan Benner of TV Guide praised the filming style of the show, and explained that the writing and pop-culture references would appeal to children. Katie Minard of Entertainment Weekly listed "Picture Day" as the best episode of the series in her 2016 ranking, arguing that it has a relatable plot and an important moral.

=== Awards and nominations ===
Awards and nominations received by Lizzie McGuire
| Award | Year | Recipient(s) and nominee(s) | Category | Result | Ref. |
|---|---|---|---|---|---|
| ALMA Award | 2002 | Lizzie McGuire | Outstanding Children's Television Programming | Nominated | |
| British Academy Children's Awards | 2002 | Lizzie McGuire | Best International | Nominated | |
| Imagen Awards | 2003 | Lalaine | Best Supporting Actress in Television | Nominated | |
| Nickelodeon Kids' Choice Awards | 2002 | Lizzie McGuire | Favorite Television Show | Won | |
| Nickelodeon Kids' Choice Awards | 2003 | Adam Lamberg | Favorite Television Actor | Nominated | |
| Nickelodeon Kids' Choice Awards | 2003 | Hilary Duff | Favorite Television Actress | Nominated | |
| Nickelodeon Kids' Choice Awards | 2003 | Lizzie McGuire | Favorite Television Show | Won | |
| Nickelodeon Kids' Choice Awards | 2004 | Hilary Duff | Favorite Television Actress | Nominated | |
| Nickelodeon Kids' Choice Awards | 2004 | Lizzie McGuire | Favorite Television Show | Nominated | |
| Nickelodeon Kids' Choice Awards | 2005 | Hilary Duff | Favorite Television Actress | Nominated | |
| Nickelodeon Kids' Choice Awards | 2005 | Lizzie McGuire | Favorite Television Show | Nominated | |
| Primetime Emmy Award | 2003 | Lizzie McGuire | Outstanding Children's Program | Nominated | |
| Primetime Emmy Award | 2004 | Lizzie McGuire | Outstanding Children's Program | Nominated | |
| Teen Choice Awards | 2003 | Lizzie McGuire | Choice TV – Comedy | Nominated | |
| Teen Choice Awards | 2003 | Hilary Duff | Choice TV Actress – Comedy | Nominated | |
| Writers Guild of America Awards | 2002 | Terri Minsky (for "Pool Party" (Note: The episode is listed under the title "Pilot".)) | Children's Script | Nominated | |
| Young Artist Award | 2002 | Hilary Duff, Lalaine, Adam Lamberg, Jake Thomas, Ashlie Brillault | Best Ensemble in a TV Series (Comedy or Drama) | Nominated | |
| Young Artist Award | 2002 | Hilary Duff | Best Performance in a TV Comedy Series: Leading Young Actress | Nominated | |
| Young Artist Award | 2002 | Lalaine | Best Performance in a TV Comedy Series: Supporting Young Actress | Nominated | |
| Young Artist Award | 2003 | Hilary Duff, Lalaine, Adam Lamberg, Jake Thomas | Best Ensemble in a TV Series (Comedy or Drama) | Nominated | |
| Young Artist Award | 2003 | Lizzie McGuire | Best Family Television Series (Comedy or Drama) | Nominated | |
| Young Artist Award | 2003 | Amy Castle | Best Performance in a TV Comedy Series: Guest Starring Young Actress | Won | |
| Young Artist Award | 2003 | Jake Thomas | Best Performance in a TV Series (Comedy or Drama): Supporting Young Actor | Nominated | |
| Young Artist Award | 2004 | Jake Thomas | Best Performance in a TV Series (Comedy or Drama): Supporting Young Actor | Nominated | |
