= Amy Castle =

American actress

- Occupations: YouTuber; actress; musical artist
- Years active: 1994–present
- Website: amycastle.com

Amy Castle is an American actress, singer and internet personality. She is known for her role as Viki Vanderheusen on Passions, and as the "Cuppycake Girl".

== Career ==
On February 26, 1994, she sang "The Cuppycake Song" at 3 years old. She released an album called Balloons in 1995 to go along with the song. The original video went viral on the internet.

After that, she began studying acting at the age of 4, and signed with her manager and first agent in Fall of 1998. On her fifth audition, she landed the role of young Ally on the hit TV series Ally McBeal. During the show's second and third seasons she appeared in eight episodes. Since then, she has appeared in many other shows, including The Norm Show, Providence, Lizzie McGuire, Oliver Beene, Malcolm in the Middle, and Summerland.

In 2002, Castle won a Young Artist Award for "Best Performance In A Comedy Series - Guest Starring Young Actress" for her work on Lizzie McGuire in the episode "Just Like Lizzie". In the summer of 2007, Castle booked what is currently her largest role to date, a recurring part on the daytime drama Passions. She plays Viki, the niece of Harmony resident Esme Vanderheusen.

In 2009, Castle played Tara on General Hospital.

In 2010, she played Amy Dillard in the episode "Nevada vs Senator Harper" of The Defenders.

== Filmography ==
- 1998–2000: Ally McBeal as Young Ally (7 episodes)
- 1999: The Norm Show as Khali (1 episode)
- 2001: Providence as Lisa (1 episode)
- 2002: Lizzie McGuire as Andie Robinson (1 episode)
- 2004: Malcolm in the Middle as Hayley (1 episode)
- 2004: Oliver Beene as Bonnie (1 episode)
- 2005: Summerland as Regan (1 episode)
- 2007–08: Passions as Viki Vanderheusen (Role: August 20, 2007 — July 14, 2008)
- 2009: General Hospital as Tara (Recurring)
- 2010: The Defenders as Amy Dillard (Co-Star)
