= Jake Thomas =

American actor (born 1990)

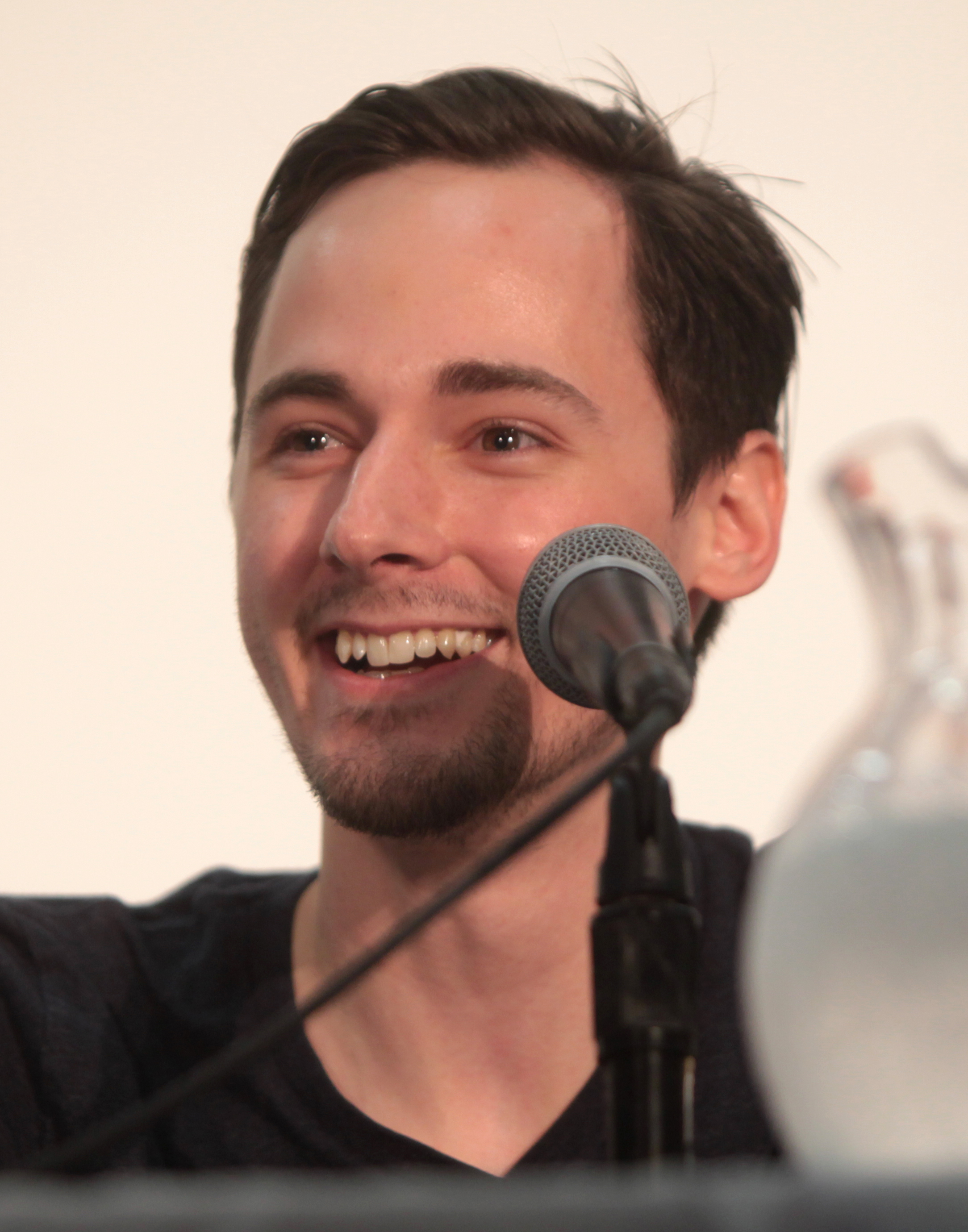
- Thomas at the 2014 VidCon
- Born: January 30, 1990 (age 36); Knoxville, Tennessee, U.S.
- Education: California State University, Northridge (BA)
- Occupations: Actor; director
- Years active: 1999–present
- Father: Bob Thomas
- Website: www.jakethomas.com

Jake Thomas (born January 30, 1990) is an American actor and director. From 2001 to 2004, he starred as Matt McGuire on the Disney Channel show Lizzie McGuire. In 2002, Thomas won a Young Artist Award for supporting actor for his performance as Martin Swinton in A.I. Artificial Intelligence (2001). He also appeared in Cory in the House (2007–2008), playing the role of Jason Stickler.

== Biography ==
Thomas was born in Knoxville, Tennessee, the son of Kim Simmons Thomas, a television reporter and writer, and Bob Thomas, a radio personality, actor and writer. The youngest of three children, he has two older siblings. Thomas attended Farragut High School, where he dissected worms with U.S. Army Major James Twigg, and graduated from California State University, Northridge with a degree in screenwriting and Japanese.

He played Matt McGuire, the title character's younger brother on Lizzie McGuire, which ran from 2001 to 2004 on Disney Channel. He was set to reprise the role in the series’ continuation on Disney+ although the show was later cancelled in December 2020 before it could be released.

Thomas auditioned for the role of Mowgli in The Jungle Book 2 (2003) before Haley Joel Osment was eventually cast. Thomas and Osment acted together in A.I. Artificial Intelligence (2001).

Thomas has appeared in numerous television shows and films, including playing Eric Miller in the Without a Trace episode "Wannabe", playing a young Hugh Hefner in the television film Hefner: Unauthorized, appearing in an episode of 3rd Rock from the Sun, and having the recurring role of Jason Stickler in Cory in the House.

Thomas also works as a commercial photographer and director.

Thomas travels between Los Angeles and Knoxville, Tennessee.

== Filmography ==
=== Film ===
Year	Film	Role	Notes
2000	If Tomorrow Comes	Young Adam	
2000	The Cell	Young Carl Rudolph Stargher	
2001	A.I. Artificial Intelligence	Martin Swinton	
2003	The Lizzie McGuire Movie	Matthew "Matt" McGuire	
2004	DinoCroc	Michael Banning	
2004	Soccer Dog: European Cup	Zach Connolly	
2018	Baja	Bryan Johnson	
2018	The Unwilling	Darren	

=== Television ===
Year	Film	Role	Notes
1999	3rd Rock from the Sun	Kid	Episode: "Y2dicK"
1999	Touched by an Angel	Thomas	Episode: "Such a Time as This"
1999	Hefner: Unauthorized	Young Hef (Age 9)	a.k.a. Hugh Hefner: The True Story
1999	The Man Show	Jake	Episode: "Bad Old Days"
2001–2004	Lizzie McGuire	Matthew "Matt" McGuire	Main role
2001–2005	Express Yourself	Himself	Interstitial series
2002	Body & Soul	Raymond White	Episode: "Shadow Boxing"
2003	Sixteen to Life	Mike	Television film
2003	National Lampoon's Christmas Vacation 2	Clark 'Third' Johnson	Television film
2003–2005, 2007	The Grim Adventures of Billy & Mandy	Nigel Planter	Voice role; 4 episodes
2004	Without a Trace	Eric Miller	Episode: "Wannabe"
2005	Center of the Universe	Waylon	Episode: "The New Neighbours"
2007–2008	Cory in the House	Jason Stickler	Recurring role, 11 episodes
2008	Aces 'N' Eights	Noah	Television film
2008	ER	Nick	Episode: "...As the Day She Was Born"
2008	Cold Case	Hugh Mastersen '78	Episode: "Roller Girl"
2008	Her Only Child	Kevin	Television film
2009	Lie to Me	James Cole	Episode: "Pilot"
2009	Eleventh Hour	Brian Dahl	Episode: "Eternal"
2009	House	Ryan	Episode: "Unfaithful"
2009	Trust Me	Steve	Episode: "Odd Man Out"
2009	CSI: Miami	Lucas Galinetti	Episode: "Chip/Tuck"
2009	Rules of Engagement	Toby	Episode: "Twice"
2009	Ghost Whisperer	Andrew Carlin	Episode: "Endless Love"
2010	Criminal Minds	Scott Kagan	Episode: "Middle Man"
2011	The Secret Life of the American Teenager	Boy Dancing	Episode: "And Circumstance"
2011	Betrayed at 17	Shane Ross	Television film
2012	NCIS	Alec Dell	Episode: "Namesake"
2012	CSI: NY	Steve Davis	Episode: "Clue: CSI"
2013–2014	Storytellers	Finn Avery	Main role
2014	Taken Away	Lucas	Television film
2015	Romantically Speaking	Martin	Television film
2019	S.W.A.T	Bayo	Episode: "Encore"
2024	NCIS	Derek Bailey	Episode: "Left Unsaid"

=== Video game ===
Year	Film	Role	Notes
2005	Brave: The Search for Spirit Dancer	Brave	
2025	MindsEye	Marco Silva	
