= Double Header =

- The Ren & Stimpy Show episode
- Episode no.: Season 4 Episode 14
- Directed by: Michael Kim
- Written by: Bob Camp; Jim Gomez
- Original air date: January 7, 1995

Episode chronology
← Previous "Eggyölkeo"	Next → "The Scotsman in Space"

"Double Header" is the fourteenth episode of the fourth season of The Ren & Stimpy Show. It originally aired on Nickelodeon in the United States on January 7, 1995.

== Plot ==
Ren and Stimpy are at a bus station late at night. Ren demands to be taken farther than humanly possible until the employee points out that the last station is the Ursa Minor. It is revealed that Ren bought a one-way ticket to the constellation for Stimpy to make him leave forever; Stimpy refuses to let go of Ren's leg after hearing his reasoning, not knowing what he did wrong. Ren remembers incidents where Stimpy produces a living fart, shaves his fur and places a mind-controlling helmet on him, grows an extra buttock, wharfs hairballs on him and gets brain damage from being kicked by Mr. Horse. Ren abusively yells at Stimpy when the bus to Ursa Minor runs them over, despite trying to brake.

Ren wakes up to see a doctor resembling Dr. Scratchansniff from Animaniacs sawing on his body while a nurse hammers him into unconsciousness. When they wake up, it is revealed that they are at a shady "discount hospital" where they were successfully revived... by being fused together. Ren realizes this when he realizes his right hand is Stimpy's The taxi driver who drives them home is shocked at the sight of the fused being.

At night, Ren struggles to sleep due to Stimpy's loud snoring. At 4 a.m., Stimpy wakes up to watch his favorite television series Stomper Room. When Stimpy reveals it is Sunday, Ren immediately goes to work at this time; he is late and is berated by his boss, with Stimpy's foolishness further angering him. Ren starts his assignment, manufacturing nuclear bombs at a secret factory, whom he had spent thirteen years in night school to qualify and pays well enough to feed them both. During a 10-second break, Stimpy foolishly pulls the lever at a red light signal, dropping radioactive material and blowing up the factory. The duo are unharmed, but Ren's boss fires them and recommends them to go to a freak show while slowly dying of radioactive poisoning.

At the freak show, the Salesman, who is responsible for recruits, asks them for their qualifications, noting that being a fused being is not enough; he himself is a pair of conjoined twins, with the other twin dead at birth as its head was fused into the Salesman. Stimpy tries to wharf a hairball, which is spit from Ren's mouth and impressing the Salesman. They are exhibited as "Siamese Geeks", with Ren chasing viewers away by yelling, only for them to return after munching on a chicken's head. They are sent to their lunch break; Ren sees a man with another mouth at the back of his face eat a submarine sandwich while a man-snake hybrid eats an egg he had left over. Ren finally snaps after hearing the other exhibited people being at peace with being calling "freaks", which he cannot handle. The others are concerned at his immense rage and denial of the situation, only to accept it after Stimpy comforts him. Unfortunately, Ursa Minor comes crashing down and flattens the duo.

The duo are saved again at the same "discount hospital" where the surgeon saves their lives again, but with Ren imprinted on Stimpy's back due to the seriousness of the accident. He trembles in fear when Stimpy enjoys his lunch of barbecued Boston baked beans, ending the episode when Stimpy farts.

== Cast ==
- Billy West as Ren, Stimpy, Ren's boss, and Salesman (That Guy)

== Production ==
The episode was directed by Michael Kim (who would later go on to work at Fox Television Animation to become a storyboard artist for Futurama, then as director for American Dad!, and currently as director for Family Guy.), with Bob Camp and Jim Gomez writing the script. Kim had been working in the animation industry since he was 16 and he had been recruited to work for Spümcø by series creator John Kricfalusi. Kricfalusi considered Kim to be a highly talented individual, realizing his talent from his work on The New Adventures of Beany and Cecil. He made him his protégé and convinced him to back off from working on Batman: The Animated Series at Warner Bros. Animation with higher pay. Kim worked on every episode as a layout artist until his firing, where Kricfalusi was dissatisfied at his inability to provide large amounts of layouts in little time during the production of "Man's Best Friend". When Spümcø lost the contract for The Ren & Stimpy Show, Kim was among the studio's alumni who migrated to Games Animation. Kim and, storyboard artist and future DreamWorks animator, Tom McGrath intended the episode to be a tribute to David Lynch, adding elements of the 1980 film The Elephant Man to the story. The episode detailing Ren and Stimpy's relationship contrasts with their relationship from Kim's previous episode "Ren's Bitter Half", as their close relationship is examined compared to that of them being split and distanced from each other. The episode also contained clips from "Ren's Bitter Half", as well as a few Spümcø episodes such as "Son of Stimpy", "Stimpy's Invention", "A Visit to Anthony", and "Svën Höek", during Ren's flashbacks.

== Reception ==
American journalist Thad Komorowski rated the episode four and a half out of five stars, noting it to be a satisfying and cohesive episode and brilliant tribute to filmmaker David Lynch while calling it one of the greatest episodes in the series to be produced by Games Animation.

== Books and articles ==
- Dobbs, G. Michael (2015). Escape – How Animation Broke into the Mainstream in the 1990s. Orlando: BearManor Media. ISBN 978-1593931100.
- Komorowski, Thad (2017). Sick Little Monkeys: The Unauthorized Ren & Stimpy Story. Albany, Georgia: BearManor Media. ISBN 978-1629331836.
