= Lair of the Lummox =

- The Ren & Stimpy Show episode
- Episode no.: Season 3 Episode 16
- Directed by: Bob Camp
- Written by: Bob Camp; John Kricfalusi; Jim Smith (uncredited)
- Production code: RS-327
- Original air date: July 30, 1994

Episode chronology
← Previous "Ren's Bitter Half"	Next → "Hermit Ren"

"Lair of the Lummox" is the sixteenth episode and season finale from the third season of The Ren & Stimpy Show. It originally aired on Nickelodeon in the United States on July 30, 1994. It is the second and last episode of the Untamed World sub-series after "A Cartoon".

== Plot ==
Ren and Stimpy are once again hosts of the nature show Untamed World. Ren had acquired a parasitic slug from their last adventure. Stimpy introduces the species they are going to mark in the episode, a Lummox (numerous had appeared unidentified in prior episodes and Jimminy Lummox was intended to be introduced after this episode had aired). They are morbidly obese and gluttonous humanoid beings with copious body hair and a severe intellectual disability. The duo travel to the non-existent continent of Ignoramia to find a Lummox, whose population outside the continent has dwindled outside the continent in favor of humans and talking animals.

The duo had attempted to find a Lummox to no avail in months. Stimpy, a skilled tracker, finally finds signs of the creature; its "droppings", namely garbage from junk food left behind by the gluttonous creature. They finally find the individual Lummox, crying in joy despite the risk of chasing away the creature. The Lummox notices the duo, who is fooled by the duo's attempts to imitate his actions. Their tomfoolery gets to a level where Ren refuses to continue acting: scratching his buttocks, which Stimpy immediately acts to secure the Lummox's trust.

The Lummox "feasts" on a hot meal. He uses a pork chop to groom his face to a satisfactory appearance, while rubbing mashed potatoes on its belly. The Lummox then offers for dessert, but Stimpy refuses, much to the Lummox's anger. He beats his chest like a gorilla to scare the duo; Ren feeds Stimpy a bucket of lard in an attempt to appease to the Lummox. Impressed, the Lummox carries the duo away, considering them to his cousins. He carries the duo to his residence. The trio watch sports on television while they drink a bucket of mayonnaise to bond.

The next morning, Stimpy demonstrates the mating ritual of Lummoxes, initiating it with a corned beef sandwich. He attracts a Tree Lummox. He marks the territory by removing his underpants and nails it on a tree. The Lummox the duo had befriended, named Booger Red, also emerges to mate, with a female Lummox, the Lummox Cow also being attracted. The two Lummoxes quickly eat junk food to impress her while she inspects the duo's underpants. She prefers the Tree Lummox due to his underpants' size, to the anger of Booger Red. He challenges the Tree Lummox to a fight. They taunt each other with their belly fat, with Booger Red launching a pen onto the Tree Lummox to his fury. Ren and Stimpy almost forgot to record the fight, starting a moment before the action; Stimpy carves the duo's taunts in a foolish (and surprisingly efficient) act. The Lummoxes insult each other with increasingly sophisticated acts, from spit to burping the alphabet and a single word; Booger Red manages to win the fight by burping the Gettysburg Address. The Tree Lummox leaves in shame while The Lummox Cow takes Booger Red as her husband.

Back at their headquarters, Ren and Stimpy initiate the mating ritual again, attracting the Lummoxes who they had befriended. They are hugged by the Lummoxes, ending the episode.

== Cast ==
- Billy West as Ren and Stimpy
- Bob Camp as the Red-Freckled Lummox
- Harris Peet as Killer Kowalski

== Production ==
The episode was written in 1992 for the second season of The Ren & Stimpy Show at Spümcø. The episode was approved, but much of the more vulgar humor was censored by Nickelodeon. Series creator and writer John Kricfalusi wanted to expand the episode to half an hour, which further delayed the episode. When Spümcø lost the contract for The Ren & Stimpy Show on September 21, 1992, the episode was taken over by Games Animation, which held it for the third season due to production delays. This is the first of the episodes in the series to be animated by Wang Film Productions in Taiwan, followed by both season four episodes, "It's a Dog's Life" and "Eggyölkeo". Jim Smith did the storyboards for the episode and contributed to writing; it was the last episode with Smith's involvement as he had refused to join Games. Showrunner and episode co-writer Bob Camp directed the episode in place of Kricfalusi.

The climax where a fart is lit on fire was removed in some airings. The segment featuring a parody of Kentucky Fried Chicken was removed on some television airings and later home media releases, though it would be retained on later releases, albeit without being digitally restored.

== Reception ==
American journalist Thad Komorowski gave the episode four out of five stars, praising its farce.

== Books and articles ==
- Dobbs, G. Michael (2015). Escape – How Animation Broke into the Mainstream in the 1990s. Orlando: BearManor Media. ISBN 978-1593931100.
- Komorowski, Thad (2017). Sick Little Monkeys: The Unauthorized Ren & Stimpy Story. Albany, Georgia: BearManor Media. ISBN 978-1629331836.
