= The Littlest Giant =

- The Ren & Stimpy Show episode
- Episode no.: Season 1 Episode 4a
- Directed by: John Kricfalusi (uncredited)
- Story by: John Kricfalusi; Bob Camp
- Production code: RS-04A
- Original air date: September 29, 1991

Episode chronology
← Previous "The Boy Who Cried Rat!"	Next → "Fire Dogs"

"The Littlest Giant" is the seventh episode of the first season of The Ren & Stimpy Show. It originally aired on Nickelodeon in the United States on September 15, 1991. A censored version of "Big House Blues" aired afterwards in place of another episode, being the pilot's first airing on the channel.

== Plot ==
The episode starts in the same manner as that of "Robin Höek", except that Ren utters his prayers in an absent-minded way. Unlike that episode, the episode does not cut back to reality and hence the actual Ren does not reappear.

Stimpy portrays a giant who is the smallest in his family. He is constantly abused by his brothers, who resemble Curly Howard and Larry Fine of the Three Stooges. As such, he is extremely self-conscious and lives a miserable life. He decides to leave home in search for companionship; he writes a letter to notify his brothers of his absence, but chooses to swallow it in spite. The giant travels as far as he can, horrifying people and animals.

At a village, a peasant named Wee Ren complains of the harsh conditions of the area; the land is barren and the well is empty. Due to malnutrition, his cow only produces powdered milk and his chicken lays eggs made of silt. The following morning, he is awoken by the sound of the giant crying, only to realize that the giant's tears have filled up the well. The cow drinks as much tears as she can, finally able to produce actual milk after rehydration, and the land's glory was restored by the excess tears. Both Ren and the cow are overjoyed.

Ren makes a bargain with the giant, where he agrees to take care of the giant in exchange for the giant keeping the farmland sustainable. They live together, happily ever after, except that Ren has to endure the giant's loud snoring for the rest of his life.

== Cast ==
- John Kricfalusi as Ren
- Billy West as Stimpy and Big Mean Giant #2
- Harris Peet as Big Mean Giant #1

== Production ==
The episode was the second and last in a short-lived series called Stimpy's Storybook Land. Jim Smith drew background scenes based on the work of N. C. Wyeth, that gave the story "an appropriate storybook look and feel". The intro is the same of that of "Robin Höek", with the shoddy work causing newly added voice lines to be disconnected from the animation. The team who worked on "The Littlest Giant" have panned the writing on the episode, with Bob Camp calling it an episode where "you have to wait for them to say what's going to happen before it happens". The director, John Kricfalusi, disowned the episode and had his name removed from the credits, later nicknaming it "The Littlest Jokes" in scorn. Its next planned Stimpy's Storybook Land episode, "Magical Golden Singing Cheeses" was rejected due to its graphic nature, so it had to be retooled by Bob Camp for a season four episode with Games Animation being involved.

== Reception ==
Thad Komorowski, giving the episode two out of five stars, wrote that "The Littlest Giant" was one of the worst episodes in the first season. He criticized it for being no different from a "run-of-the-mill Saturday morning cartoon".
