= Powdered Toast Man vs. Waffle Woman =

- The Ren & Stimpy Show episode
- Episode no.: Season 4 Episode 11
- Directed by: Chris Reccardi
- Story by: Bob Camp; Chris Reccardi; Vince Calandra
- Original air date: November 19, 1994

Guest appearances
- Gail Matthius as Waffle Woman and Little Johnny

Episode chronology
← Previous "I Love Chicken"	Next → "It's a Dog's Life"

"Powdered Toast Man vs. Waffle Woman" is the eleventh episode of the fourth season of The Ren & Stimpy Show. It originally aired on Nickelodeon in the United States on November 19, 1994.

== Plot ==
Powdered Toast Man, under his civilian alter ego Pastor Toastman, holds a sermon in front of a band of old women playing bingo. Suddenly, he receives a secret message encoded in olive loaf; he reads it, realizes that Little Johnny is in trouble, and hence immediately leaves the church to save him. The church bell is stuck on his head until he arrives.

Little Johnny, a sickly boy on life-support, demands to see the President of the United States, to whom he had requested personally and was too busy to respond. Powdered Toast Man accidentally breaks the boy's life-support system while he lifts off. He is being watched by Vicky Velcro, a business rival whose product, Liquid Waffles, never recovered after Powdered Toast surpassed it in sales and instantly bankrupted her.

The President is at the U.N. signing a peace treaty that will result in eternal world peace. He abducts the President, which angers everyone, especially the Arabs. Powdered Toast Man realizes he has little time, so he uses extreme high speed, which burns him and incinerates the President to death. He realizes his mistake after arriving at the hospital, making Little Johnny cry and pass out from frustration. He heads to his secret hideout, the Breadbox of Solitude, in an extremely miserable mood after the nurse berates him and finding out he had inadvertently caused World War III. Meanwhile, Vicky transforms herself into Waffle Woman by crushing herself with a giant waffle iron, which does little more than just give her a helmet resembling a waffle. Waffle Woman kidnaps Little Johnny and threatens "no television for him" (murdering him) if Powdered Toast Man does not engage in a fight with her; Powdered Toast Man does not care until he sees Little Johnny crying for help. He immediately regains his morale, only to be electrocuted by a faulty socket. As he leaves the Breadbox, it breaks down, erupts into fire and begins to descend to Earth at Hollywood.

As Powdered Toast Man arrives, he is hit by an iron thrown by Waffle Woman and dodges two strawberry bombs, which blow up the hospital Little Johnny is in. He retaliates by shooting bread out of his head, which blows up the Headquarters of the United Nations and kills everyone except for the Arabs, who complain. Waffle Woman shoots maple syrup, which Powdered Toast Man dodges by levitating his head; the syrup lands on San Francisco near the Golden Gate Bridge and the World Trade Center, killing everyone in its presence. Powdered Toast Man destroys England after insulting Waffle Woman's secretary. They both destroy more and more of Earth until only the platform they stood on is left. Powdered Toast Man finally defeats Waffle Woman after he destroys her giant waffle iron, turning her into a slime-like form as she swears revenge and floats away. Despite indirectly destroying the world in a cataclysm, Little Johnny cheers as Powdered Toast Man salutes at what remains of Earth, ending the episode.

== Cast ==
- Gary Owens as Powdered Toast Man
- Gail Matthius as Waffle Woman and Little Johnny

== Production ==
The story was originally conceived as a pilot pitch for a potential spin-off series with Gary Owens as the voice of Powdered Toast Man following the success of the 1992 episode. Like with the previous episode, "A Hard Day's Luck", which aired one week prior where Ren and Stimpy did not appear in the episode and was also a pilot pitch featuring The Scotsman as his sole episode, the main duo also did not appear in this episode as it was a way to test the appeal to audiences of a story that only featured Powdered Toast Man. The episode was the last episode to be developed at Chris Reccardi's unit at Games Animation, which most employees – including Reccardi's wife Lynne Naylor, who produced the storyboards for the episode – were dissatisfied by the work experience. Gail Matthius was recruited as a guest star (voicing both Waffle Woman and Little Johnny) in showrunner Bob Camp's multiple attempts to invigorate discussion on the series.

== Censorship ==
Like its predecessor, it was also controversial in the United States. Following the September 11th attacks, the episode was edited to remove the scene involving New York getting destroyed. The scene where syrup hits the World Trade Center was digitally removed following the real-life terrorist attacks, and it has never been seen in any release since.

== Reception ==
American critic Thad Komorowski rated the episode three out of five stars, noting that its detrimentally nonsensical and inane nature was even worse than its predecessor.

== Books and articles ==
- Dobbs, G. Michael (2015). Escape – How Animation Broke into the Mainstream in the 1990s. Orlando: BearManor Media. ISBN 978-1593931100.
- Finley, Laura L. (2018). Violence in Popular Culture American and Global Perspectives. Santa Monica: ABC-CLIO. ISBN 9781440854330.
- Komorowski, Thad (2017). Sick Little Monkeys: The Unauthorized Ren & Stimpy Story. Albany, Georgia: BearManor Media. ISBN 978-1629331836.
