= Farm Hands (The Ren & Stimpy Show) =

- The Ren & Stimpy Show episode
- Episode no.: Season 4 Episode 7
- Directed by: Bob Camp
- Written by: Bob Camp; Jim Gomez; Ron Hauge
- Production code: RS-315
- Original air date: November 5, 1994

Episode chronology
← Previous "Prehistoric Stimpy"	Next → "Magical Golden Singing Cheeses"

"Farm Hands" is the seventh episode of the fourth season of The Ren & Stimpy Show. It originally aired on Nickelodeon in the United States on November 5, 1994.

== Plot ==
Abner and Ewalt own a surprisingly well-operated farm. They try to find children to help with their chores, only to remember the children they had hired died by multiple acts of their incompetence, with one being hanged to death. They try to order "dehydrated children" from a comic book but they cannot read due to their illiteracy. They find the product in their mailbox but confuse it with chewing tobacco. They chew it and spit, coincidentally how the children is summoned; the children, Ren and Stimpy, are spawned. Much to their chagrin, the duo are sent to do chores.

Ren tries to collect eggs but are stopped by the gangster-like hens. One of the hens agrees to be mobilized by another hen by producing eggs, which hit Ren as he escapes while being held. He however succeeds after pretending to be a chicken to fool the hens, only to be thwarted by a lovesick rooster, who is also fooled, giving him an earthworm and rocks to digest it as a sign of love. Ren is angered while Stimpy amuses himself by stepping on a rake.

Ren, Stimpy and Abner wait for lunch, with Ewalt approaching with the food, a surprisingly edible meal. Ren and Stimpy dig in, only to be stopped by Abner, who claims that teeth is a source of disease; they pluck out all of the duo's teeth. They are forced to eat while digesting with rocks, just like how Ren suffered earlier.

Ren and Stimpy feed the pigs with no problem; Abner and Ewalt, dressed like pigs to waste time, order them to milk the cow. Unfortunately, there is no cow, instead being a gorilla with an udder, who beats Ren up and puts him into the bucket. Stimpy is close to being assaulted by Mr. Horse for being on his litter box when he saves Ren from the bucket. Stimpy successfully milks the gorilla, who rewards his patience by feeding him some milk. Ren is left with handling Mr. Horse, doing nothing while being used by Mr. Horse for his amusement and company.

Stimpy harvests corn while a tired and depressed Ren complains about hidden surveillance; Abner and Ewalt have hanged themselves on a cross like scarecrows to monitor them; this fails as a crow tries to unsuccessfully pick Ewalt's eye, which he reacts with amusement. They then dig an increasingly deep hole under the toilet at the bathroom, which they bemoan; the gorilla goes to the bathroom, with his waste landing on the duo and traumatizing Ren. Suddenly, Abner remembers that a tornado is coming at 4 p.m., which happens every day; Ren and Stimpy seek shelter in the toilet while Abner and Ewalt are blown away alongside the house, surviving as they had installed seat belts in a somewhat intelligent move. Ren is concerned by everything being blown away, only for the gorilla to reappear, which quells his concerns; the gorilla defecates on them as before, ending the episode.

== Cast ==
- Billy West as Ren and Stimpy
- Bob Camp as Abner and Ewalt Dimwit

== Production ==
Stephen DeStefano produced the storyboards for the episode. The title card is a parody of the painting American Gothic. The duo Abner and Ewalt return from "Out West", both voiced by showrunner Bob Camp, as Abner's voice actor Jim Smith had left production during the second season alongside John Kricfalusi and Spümcø. Much of the episode reused animation from that episode as a cost-saving measure, with Rough Draft Korea reanimating and recoloring Carbunkle Cartoons' animation. As "Out West" was animated with digital ink-and-paint, "Farm Hands" was animated with traditional ink-and-paint, showing a clear difference in animation quality between the two episodes. The scene where Ren and Stimpy are in pain after having their teeth pulled out by Abner was censored in the home media release, but was restored in later television and streaming airings.

== Reception ==
American critic Thad Komorowski gave the episode two and a half out of five stars, calling it forgettable and uninspired despite its funny premise.

== Books and articles ==
- Dobbs, G. Michael (2015). Escape – How Animation Broke into the Mainstream in the 1990s. Orlando: BearManor Media. ISBN 978-1593931100.
- Komorowski, Thad (2017). Sick Little Monkeys: The Unauthorized Ren & Stimpy Story. Albany, Georgia: BearManor Media. ISBN 978-1629331836.
