= The Scotsman in Space =

- The Ren & Stimpy Show episode
- Episode no.: Season 4 Episode 15
- Directed by: Bob Camp
- Written by: Bob Camp; Jim Gomez; Bill Wray
- Production code: RS-412
- Original air date: January 7, 1995

Guest appearance
- Alan Young as Haggis MacHaggis

Episode chronology
← Previous "Double Header"	Next → "Pixie King"

"The Scotsman in Space" is the fifteenth episode of the fourth season of The Ren & Stimpy Show. It originally aired on Nickelodeon in the United States on January 7, 1995.

== Plot ==
In a story similar to "Space Madness", Ren and Stimpy portray Commander Höek and Space Cadet Stimpy, who embark on a 36-year journey to acquire a pack of chewing gum. As expected, Ren begins to acquire symptoms of the titular Space Madness, believing Stimpy to be plotting against him when he is playing Whac-A-Mole. This is exemplified by what seems to be illusions of Haggis MacHaggis, freaking out on every occurrence until he snaps and threatens to eat a fly on board. The plot of the original episode fully derails when all three notice Haggis, finding him floating near the spacecraft and inexplicably able to breathe and survive. After the fly insists to be eaten and flies into Ren's stomach, the duo admit Haggis.

Due to Stimpy's incompetence with the translator, he misinterprets Haggis' intention of retrieving his sheep as wanting to eat cheap. He prepares dehydrated haggis for Ren and Haggis, but Haggis is repulsed by the lack of chutney, causing him to become aggressive and subsequently pinned down by the duo. They bring him in to do tests, which include Stimpy eating a portion of his brain, removing Haggis' wooden dentures (for Scottish people have no teeth) and the "wallet test" where they find Haggis' wallet biologically attached to his buttock, a reference to the stereotype of Scots being tight-fisted. Haggis awakes in rage, immediately takes control of the duo and forces them to embody sheep, grow wool for six months, shear themselves and make kilts as he identifies the duo as sheep from his stupidity.

The trio eat breakfast, only for Haggis to become aggressive again as he does not like the look of the bacon and eggs. His wallet disconnects from his body as he yelps in pain, with a genie coming out after Ren and Stimpy opens it. He allows the duo to make three wishes, with one additional for free as a deal. Ren wishes for beautiful women and all the money in the world, which he finds to be highly satisfying, only to be undone by Stimpy's wishes: remove all humans' need of material possessions, racial equality and for everyone to be in a hot and sunny place. The wishes disintegrate the spaceship, bring the five characters to the Sun's gravitational belt, transform them into racist stereotypes and incinerate to death as they gravitate to the Sun before Ren can slap Stimpy for his stupidity. Haggis' dentures mock the duo, ending the episode.

== Cast ==
- Billy West as Ren, Stimpy and Mr. Horse
- Alan Young as Haggis MacHaggis
- Stephen DeStefano as Genie

== Production ==
This is the first official episode featuring Haggis MacHaggis to not have full involvement of Chris Reccardi, as his unit was disbanded and his wife Lynne Naylor left production for the second time. In his place, Stephen DeStefano produced the storyboards with Bob Camp directing. Reccardi would instead spend more time directing another season four episode "Ren Needs Help!". The "what are ya!" gag would later be used in "My Shiny Friend", which would be uttered by Mr. Horse himself.

== Reception ==
American journalist Thad Komorowski gave the episode three out of five stars.

== Books and articles ==
- Dobbs, G. Michael (2015). Escape – How Animation Broke into the Mainstream in the 1990s. Orlando: BearManor Media. ISBN 978-1593931100.
- Komorowski, Thad (2017). Sick Little Monkeys: The Unauthorized Ren & Stimpy Story. Albany, Georgia: BearManor Media. ISBN 978-1629331836.
