= Ren's Bitter Half =

- The Ren & Stimpy Show episode
- Episode no.: Season 3 Episode 15
- Directed by: Michael Kim
- Written by: Michael Kim; Ron Hauge; Bob Camp
- Original air date: June 4, 1994

Episode chronology
← Previous "Eat My Cookies"	Next → "Lair of the Lummox"

"Ren's Bitter Half" is the fifteenth episode from the third season of The Ren & Stimpy Show. It originally aired on Nickelodeon in the United States on June 4, 1994.

== Plot ==
Stimpy works in a laboratory late at night, using rubber bands, "colored water" and Sterno to create a mysterious substance named XB-49. Ren walks in, where Stimpy reveals that he had become a genetic engineer, giving himself an additional buttock in a prior experiment. A furious Ren demands his dinner whom Stimpy should have cooked; he steals the substance and shakes it; it erupts on Ren, who splits into two individuals: one evil and one indifferent. Stimpy is joyful on the prospect of having a second best friend.

Stimpy watches television with the two Rens; Evil Ren repeatedly hits Indifferent Ren who does not mind the abuse. Evil Ren throws the television on top of Indifferent Ren and Stimpy, causing Indifferent Ren to be rendered unconscious. Evil Ren finds a Girl Scout at the door, who offers him cookies; he joyfully chews the cookies and spits it out in an attempt to disturb her. Stimpy unsuccessfully tries to make Indifferent Ren help; Evil Ren plugs in the television, electrocuting the duo.

Stimpy takes Indifferent Ren for a walk, who does not react; Evil Ren fortifies the door with wooden planks to keep the duo out, which is unsuccessful; they return 12 hours later to Evil Ren having constructed a factory, where he destroys Stimpy's prized possessions, including his record of "Happy Happy Joy Joy", his mouse toy and his litter box. Stimpy is traumatized by this incident; he passes out, waking in captivity with Evil Ren taking control of his laboratory. Evil Ren, glad to have become free to act on his maniacal desires, decides to splash XB-49 on himself to replicate more of him into an army, so he can conquer the world in a manner similar to the Nazi Party. This attempt splits him into another Evil Ren without his intelligence and Hideously Evil Ren, a hideous female version of himself whom he is immediately attracted to. Evil Ren kidnaps a Minister to officiate their marriage; they beat other in love and leave in a car, pulling the wall holding Stimpy and Indifferent Ren together with a chain and ending the episode.

== Cast ==
- Billy West as Ren, Stimpy, Evil Ren, Indifferent Ren, Hideously Evil Ren and the Minister
- Cheryl Chase as the Girl Scout

== Production ==
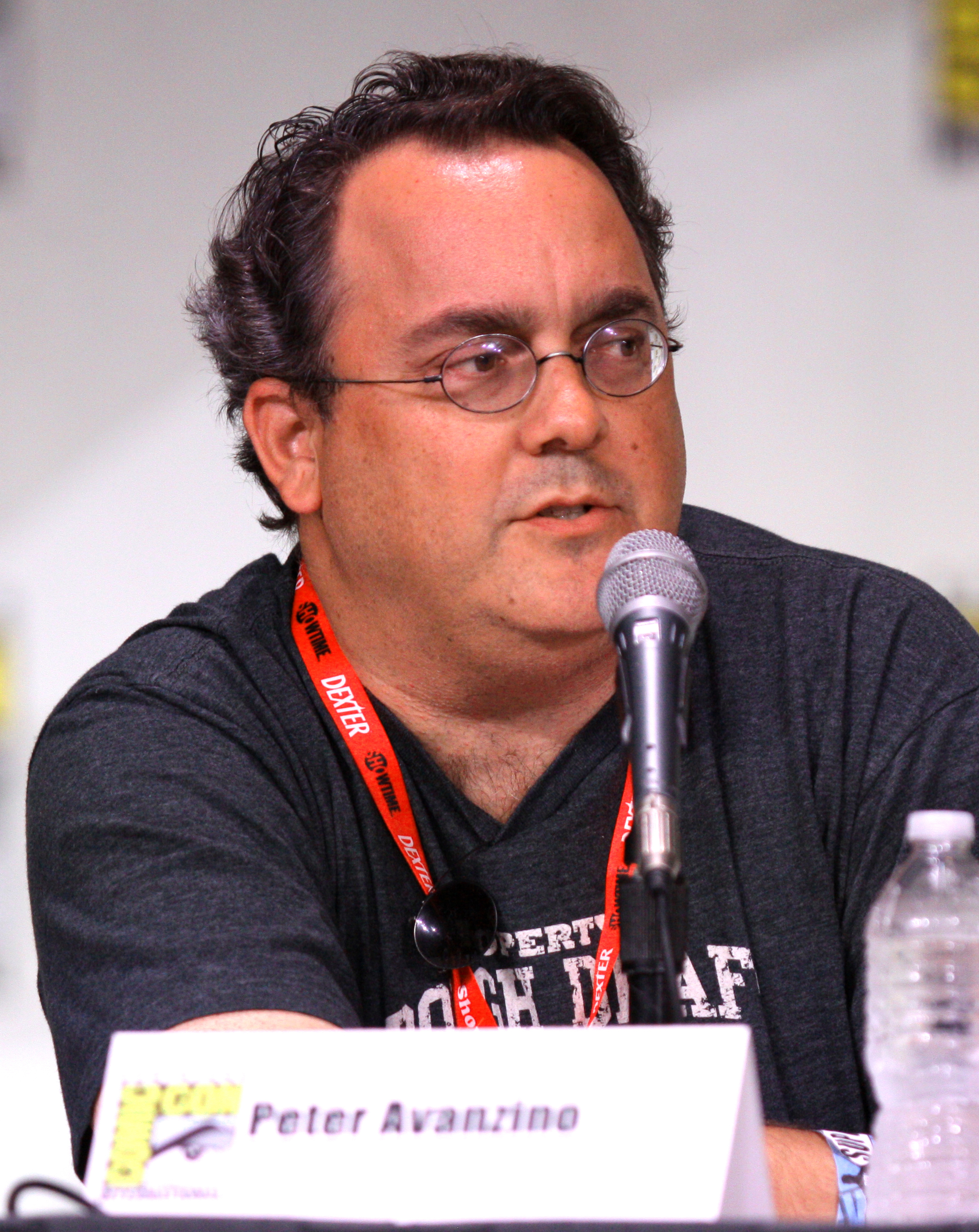
Peter Avanzino (pictured; 2011), a regular storyboard artist for the show, provided storyboards for this episode.

The episode is the first to be primarily directed by Michael Kim, who would later go on to work for Fox Television Animation to become a storyboard artist for Futurama, then as director for American Dad!, and currently as director for Family Guy. Kim had been working in the animation industry since he was 16 and he had been recruited to work for Spümcø by series creator John Kricfalusi. Kricfalusi considered Kim to be a highly talented individual, realizing his talent from his work on The New Adventures of Beany and Cecil. He made him his protégé and convinced him to back off from working on Batman: The Animated Series at Warner Bros. Animation with higher pay. Kim worked on every episode as a layout artist until his firing, where Kricfalusi was dissatisfied at his inability to provide large amounts of layouts in little time during the production of "Man's Best Friend". When Spümcø lost the contract for The Ren & Stimpy Show, Kim was among the studio's alumni who migrated to Games Animation. Kim stated in an interview: "I just wanted to get back into doing shows more like the original episodes that were just centered around Ren and Stimpy. I was just feeling my way around, I had never directed before. But I had a good idea of what I wanted and basically drew it all myself". Kim had personally contacted Bob Jaques of Carbunkle Cartoons to allow the studio to provide their animation, who showed interest but rejected due to scheduled conflicts, so Rough Draft Korea in Seoul provided the animation as usual. Peter Avanzino, who would also later go on to direct episodes for Futurama, was responsible for the episode's storyboards.

== Reception ==
American journalist Thad Komorowski gave the episode four and a half out of five stars, praising Kim's supreme draftsmanship and the story and considered it to be one of the best episodes in the series.

== Books ==
- Komorowski, Thad (2017). Sick Little Monkeys: The Unauthorized Ren & Stimpy Story. Albany, Georgia: BearManor Media. ISBN 978-1629331836.
