= Pixie King =

- The Ren & Stimpy Show episode
- Episode no.: Season 4 Episode 16
- Directed by: Ron Hughart
- Written by: Ron Hauge; Jim Gomez; Bill Wray; Bob Camp
- Original air date: January 14, 1995

Guest appearance
- Jack Carter as Wilbur Cobb

Episode chronology
← Previous "The Scotsman in Space"	Next → "Aloha Höek"

"Pixie King" is the sixteenth episode of the fourth season of The Ren & Stimpy Show. It originally aired on Nickelodeon in the United States on January 14, 1995.

== Plot ==
Ren and Stimpy own a toilet on a tree. Ren desperately needs to go, but Stimpy is wasting time in his own litter. He refuses to budge unless Ren tells him a story. He reluctantly obliges, barely holding it in while telling a fairy tale from a storybook.

Once upon a time, Ren and Stimpy are two elves living in a doughnut box. The duo sleep on a can of sardines; Stimpy is enthusiastic about life while Ren wishes he had a good wife and a real job which he dreams about. They dress up in their ridiculous costumes and go to work. They get on their bus, a ladybug, sharing space with multiple insects as the ladybug drives off. Ren despises sitting at the back with insects, with Stimpy saying that they can sit at the front when they become pixies, essentially elves with wings; the pixies on the bus are shown to have achieved this merit at an old age.

The duo check in at work, where their responsibilities are to kiss the flowers. Every elf aside from them sings about their enjoyment of work and collapse from exhaustion, but nevertheless recover from their enthusiasm. Stimpy is whipped by the pixie superiors after they mistake him for Ren spitting on the flowers. They also have to help get rid of pollen from bees' abdomen, with Ren accidentally being stabbed by a bee's stinger. Their final task is to mine "pixie dust" (actually mucus) from a sleeping human.

Ren and Stimpy take a shower, with Ren moaning about an easy way to gain pixie dust until he overhears two pixies talking about the king's recent death; he ponders joyfully about taking over and the riches he can get. The next morning, the duo get up early to work their way to be a pixie; Ren rapidly kisses a particularly tall flower, with the dew pouring like a waterfall; due to its height no pixie dares harvest its dew. The duo rapidly cleans pollen from the bees, with a fly helicopter delivering their humongous supply to headquarters, where Wilbur Cobb the pixie executive gives them wings harvested from flies.

The duo are granted less ridiculous outfits, tutus, with Ren overhearing that whoever gains the most pixie dust becomes king, a particular spot being full of it. Ren sets his sights on this new objective. At night, he sets off to the spot, the man's eyes which are full of rheum; Ren acquires a chunk but Stimpy's noise awakens the man, who beats Ren up. Fortunately, Ren manages to keep the chunk. Ren is celebrated by his village and is proclaimed king, where he immediately proclaims his changes but is stopped by Stimpy, who wants him to finish his royal duties. Ren is forced to devour royal jelly as he transforms into a gigantic creature akin to a queen bee, where he is forced to lay eggs. It is unknown if this is the real ending or is fabricated by a desperate Ren who is going to leak any minute, deceiving Stimpy into coming out and allowing Ren to defecate; he graciously uses the storybook to wipe his anus, ending the episode as he flushes.

== Cast ==
- Billy West as Ren, Stimpy, various pixies
- Jack Carter as Wilbur Cobb

== Production ==
This episode was directed by Ron Hughart, who would go on to direct episodes for Futurama, and become supervising director for American Dad!. Hughart, himself, was an individual regarded to be reliable by both series creator John Kricfalusi and Nickelodeon executives, once he was hired to direct the episode "Haunted House". Stephen DeStefano was responsible for the storyboards. DeStefano also felt vulnerable with Kricfalusi's actions when he was first brought to Games Animation, criticizing his toxic, malevolent behavior. This was also the last episode in the series to use Kricfalusi's insane laughter as Ren, which debuted in "Stimpy's Invention".

== Reception ==
American journalist Thad Komorowski gave the episode three out of five stars, noting its "barren spot-gag" nature could be overcome by improving its story, which director Hughart was not involved with.

== Books and articles ==
- Dobbs, G. Michael (2015). Escape – How Animation Broke into the Mainstream in the 1990s. Orlando: BearManor Media. ISBN 978-1593931100.
- Komorowski, Thad (2017). Sick Little Monkeys: The Unauthorized Ren & Stimpy Story. Albany, Georgia: BearManor Media. ISBN 978-1629331836.
