= Prehistoric Stimpy =

- The Ren & Stimpy Show episode
- Episode no.: Season 4 Episode 6
- Directed by: Bob Camp
- Written by: Bob Camp; Ron Hauge
- Production code: RS-322
- Original air date: November 5, 1994

Guest appearance
- Jack Carter as Wilbur Cobb

Episode chronology
← Previous "Lumber Jerks"	Next → "Farm Hands"

"Prehistoric Stimpy" is the sixth episode of the fourth season of The Ren & Stimpy Show. It originally aired on Nickelodeon in the United States on November 5, 1994.

== Plot ==
Ren and Stimpy visit a museum. They are enthralled by the dinosaur fossils, with Ren running up a particularly large one, only to be stopped by Wilbur Cobb, the museum's guide, who climbs up another dinosaur to stop him. Ren gets off easily but the dinosaur Wilbur is on collapses due to his weight. The dinosaur's skull switches spaces with Wilbur's head, scaring the duo and some nuns nearby. Wilbur magically reattaches his head.

Wilbur brings the duo on a tour. He shows them the "Stimpy-saurus", a sauropod dinosaur with an extraordinary size and an even more extraordinary stupidity. Ren removes Stimpy's stupidity award badge in shame. Wilbur removes the duo from his head, but restores their position as he accidentally removes his scalp.

Wilbur retells the "history of the world" to the duo, where they embody microbes; it is revealed that Wilbur is sitting in a bathtub, unaware that he is being exhibited as if he is a living fossil. Wilbur leaves the bathtub nearly naked, scaring the nuns yet again. His story continues, with a "Stimpyfish" walking into land for the first time and immediately drowning in a tar pit. 150 billion years later, another Stimpyfish walks into land for the first time but is able to dodge the tar pit, only to be run over by a "bus". Ren is skeptical of his claims, only for Wilbur, wearing a nun costume, to show him a fossil of the "bus", in fact a real creature.

Wilbur continues his story, skipping to the age of the dinosaurs where humans have apparently already existed at this point. Ren embodies a ferocious dinosaur resembling a tyrannosaur, which was unfortunately rendered harmless and mocked by other dinosaurs due to his minuscule size. He is immediately killed by the foot of a Stimpysaurus. Wilbur explains that Stimpysaurus helped in the development of man, as humans embodied by Ren went under the shelter of Stimpysaurus, who had adapted to living on trees during the "Treeasic period". In the occasion where it is struck by lightning, it erupts into fire and burns to death, while flattening and killing the remaining humans; more humans arrive for the warmth from the fire. The Stimpysaurus is rendered extinct after the last specimen suffocates to death at a tar pit, believing it to be water.

The trio are disposed of outside the museum, when Stimpy asks how the other dinosaurs are rendered extinct. Wilbur disproves the claims of them dying from the ice age, a comet or starvation, claiming that the dinosaurs became extinct from watching too much television. He starts to utter gibberish, with Stimpy removing his facial features to imitate him, angering Ren. He also utters increasingly absurd deaths of the dinosaurs that led to their extinction, boring the duo to the point they saw their heads off. Suddenly, he is caught by museum guards who note that Wilbur is an insane bone-polisher from nearby who had impersonated the museum guide for no reason; he is pulled away while claiming to have killed the dinosaurs. Ren and Stimpy decide to leave, proud to be evolved beings, as they walk with their heads inverted to buy tacos for lunch. They accidentally drown in a tar pit exhibit, ending the episode.

== Cast ==
- Billy West as Ren and Stimpy
- Jack Carter as Wilbur Cobb

== Production ==
The episode was animated by the Mr. Big Cartoons at Sydney, Australia. Peter Avanzino and Stephen DeStefano produced the storyboards of the episode. The scene where Stimpy rips off pieces of Cobb's face was censored in the original home video release. It was since brought back in later releases, but never restored.

== Reception ==
American critic Thad Komorowski gave the episode three out of five stars.

== Books and articles ==
- Dobbs, G. Michael (2015). Escape – How Animation Broke into the Mainstream in the 1990s. Orlando: BearManor Media. ISBN 978-1593931100.
- Komorowski, Thad (2017). Sick Little Monkeys: The Unauthorized Ren & Stimpy Story. Albany, Georgia: BearManor Media. ISBN 978-1629331836.
