= Lumber Jerks (The Ren & Stimpy Show) =

- The Ren & Stimpy Show episode
- Episode no.: Season 4 Episode 5
- Directed by: Bob Camp; Bill Wray
- Written by: Jim Gomez; Ron Hauge; Bob Camp; Bill Wray
- Production code: RS-316
- Original air date: October 15, 1994

Episode chronology
← Previous "Blazing Entrails"	Next → "Prehistoric Stimpy"

"Lumber Jerks" is the fifth episode of the fourth season of The Ren & Stimpy Show. It originally aired on Nickelodeon in the United States on October 15, 1994.

== Plot ==
Ren and Stimpy are paperboys in a village called Lumberville. They demand unpaid funds from lumberjack Jacques LaPierre, who owes their employer $1200 and had beat up Ren on a prior attempt. He convinces the duo to abandon their job to be lumberjacks to improve their strength by showing his wife, who had acquired super strength from this job.

Jacques tells the duo that he chops wood because he believes trees are dangerous and crafty beings who are defended by the spiny tree lobster, who will absolutely not let go of whoever harms its tree. He orders the duo to find a tree, with the instructions digested by Stimpy.

Every tree nearby was cut by the lumberjacks, so the duo walk through a desertification until they find a forest. They cut a tree for 3 hours, barely making protest when a lobster abducts Ren. He shows Ren the animals he had been threatening, including a wasp couple, a bird who farts as its mating call and the lobster's own offspring. Ren pretends to learn not to disturb the animals, only to return with machinery, successfully sawing the forest down and chasing the lobster away. Suddenly, the lobster reappears to attack Ren, only for him to reveal himself as Jacques in disguise. He reveals that they actually resort to blowing up forests with dynamite, but he hires the duo nonetheless. He brings the duo to a jacuzzi at night at the lumberjacks' club, where they relax as two wolverines maul the trio's bodies, much to Jacques' amusement and the duo's horror, ending the episode.

== Cast ==
- Billy West as Ren, Stimpy, Jacques LaPierre, and tree lobster

== Production ==
The episode was animated at the Rough Draft Korea studio in Seoul during Summer 1994. The episode was originally storyboarded by Peter Avanzino, but had dropped out so it was given to Bob Camp and Bill Wray, who also directed the episode (and also co-wrote with Jim Gomez and fellow Seinfeld writer Ron Hauge).

== Reception ==
The American critic Thad Komorowski gave the episode three stars out of five, attributing the over-the-top concept was better than its final product.

== Books and articles ==
- Dobbs, G. Michael (2015). Escape – How Animation Broke into the Mainstream in the 1990s. Orlando: BearManor Media. ISBN 978-1593931100.
- Komorowski, Thad (2017). Sick Little Monkeys: The Unauthorized Ren & Stimpy Story. Albany, Georgia: BearManor Media. ISBN 978-1629331836.
