= The Boy Who Cried Rat! =

- The Ren & Stimpy Show episode
- Episode no.: Season 1 Episode 3b
- Directed by: John Kricfalusi
- Story by: John Kricfalusi; Vincent Waller
- Production code: RS-03B
- Original air date: September 8, 1991

Episode chronology
← Previous "Space Madness"	Next → "The Littlest Giant"

"The Boy Who Cried Rat!" is the sixth episode of the first season of The Ren & Stimpy Show. It originally aired on Nickelodeon in the United States on September 8, 1991.

== Plot ==
A homeless Ren and Stimpy search for food in a dumpster. Being forced to eat a tin can and a sock, they nevertheless appreciate the meal until George Liquor chases them away. Stimpy suggests that they should find work, after which Ren devises a scheme where he will pretend to be a rat, while Stimpy will try to catch him, failing indefinitely to extort cash from clients. Ren sneaks into the house of the Pipe family, using a beaver hidden in his compartments to carve a mouse hole.

The next day, Stimpy shows up to the Pipe residence, claiming to be a professional mouse catcher. Mrs. Pipe finds him adorable, but Mr. Pipe believes him to be of no use until Ren appears dressed up as Mickey Mouse. This convinced the Pipe family that he is a particularly ugly rat, who pays Stimpy five dollars to catch Ren. Stimpy tries his hardest to play catching Ren, who beats him up with a comically large mallet and frying pan à la Tom and Jerry. The Pipe family, horrified of the "rat", do not realize the fairly obvious ploy and stand on top of their furniture, hoping for Ren to be caught.

Ren and Stimpy hide in the kitchen, eating the couple's food made into sandwiches. To fool the couple, Ren hits the floor with a frying pan while Stimpy breaks plates with his head. After their meal, Ren finally lets Stimpy catch him. While the duo plan to leave, Mr. Pipe insists that Stimpy eats Ren to prove his reputation. Ren is tortured inside Stimpy's mouth, with Stimpy's poor oral hygiene and fake teeth making it worse. Ironically, this ploy led to the duo's downfall, with the couple only realizing it due to Ren's refusal to be swallowed. Ren demands Stimpy to return the money, only for Stimpy to reveal he had eaten the money out of desperation. The couple forces the duo to do chores as compensation.

The Sugar Frosted Milk advertisement from the previous episode returns. In addition, a segment midway in the episode shows Ren and Stimpy celebrating Yak Shaving Day, a Christmas-like holiday where they hang diapers, fill socks with coleslaw and scan the skies for a legendary shaven yak in a flying canoe. Shaving cream must be prepared for the yak's visit, and people may be lucky enough to find the yak's left behind shavings.

== Cast ==
- John Kricfalusi as Ren
- Billy West as Stimpy and Mr. Pipe
- Cheryl Chase as Mrs. Pipe
- Harris Peet as George Liquor

== Production ==
The episode was ordered in October 1990 for a premiere scheduled for the fall of 1991. Series creator John Kricfalusi, was heavily involved in supervising the layouts of the episode.The animation was outsourced to Lacewood Productions located in Ottawa, Ontario. The episode marked the second appearance of George Liquor, with a prototype design of the character being used here. Executive producer Vanessa Coffey strongly disliked Liquor, but nevertheless allowed him to appear as a cameo.

A sequel episode, temporarily named "The Boy Who Cried Rat! 2", was to continue immediately at the point Ren enters Stimpy's mouth, but unlike its "Fire Dogs" counterpart it was never produced, even as part of Adult Party Cartoon.

== Reception ==
Thad Komorowski gave "The Boy Who Cried Rat!" four out of five stars, writing the episode was full of "sheer joy and pure anarchy".

== Books ==
- Klickstein, Matthew; Summers, Marc (2013). Slimed! An Oral History of Nickelodeon's Golden Age. London: Penguin Publishing Group. ISBN 9781101614099.
- Komorowski, Thad (2017). Sick Little Monkeys: The Unauthorized Ren & Stimpy Story. Albany, Georgia: BearManor Media. ISBN 978-1629331836.
