= Hermit Ren =

- The Ren & Stimpy Show episode
- Episode no.: Season 4 Episode 1
- Directed by: Chris Reccardi
- Story by: Bob Camp; Jim Gomez; Chris Reccardi; Bill Wray
- Production code: RS-314
- Original air date: October 1, 1994

Episode chronology
← Previous "Lair of the Lummox"	Next → "House of Next Tuesday"

"Hermit Ren" is the first episode of the fourth season of The Ren & Stimpy Show. It originally aired on Nickelodeon in the United States on October 1, 1994.

== Plot ==
Ren and Stimpy live in a house fashioned from an upside-down dead cow. While an abnormally stupid Stimpy plays his accordion, a mentally wrecked Ren takes a taxi home from work, which crashes at his doorstep; he also has to chase their neighbor's dog off their lawn. He is revealed to be involuntarily terminated (as shown by a pink slip) and is harassed for it.

Ren eats dinner, overcooked chicken which Stimpy forgot in the kitchen, which burns his tongue greatly; Stimpy cools Ren's tongue with rotten milk. Ren is even more outraged and demands to be left alone. Ren decides to shave his beard, only for Stimpy to use his razor to hammer a portrait Ren had dropped at the beginning of the episode into the wall. The blunt razor shaves Ren's chin off, which alongside him stepping on the accordion, Stimpy being stupid, a cartoon on the television and the ringing telephone, makes Ren have sensory overload, which makes him decide to leave Stimpy forever, departing with his belongings but not before returning the accordion.

Ren joins the Hermit Union, where he is granted a cave on the condition that he receives no sunlight, does not bathe and does not make any friends. He revels in the idea of peace, solitude and no Stimpy. He finds a mummy, whom he intends to abuse, but not before he announces the things he will do in the cave. Meanwhile, Stimpy foolishly bakes his accordion, believing Ren will come back.

Seven months later, Ren had spent his days playing games with himself and stacking stones on top of each other to spend time while the mummy keeping him from going too insane as his imaginary friend. Hungry and malnourished, he decides to find food, with his delusions confusing bats with a cow's udder; he attempts to milk the "cow", much to the bats' discomfort. Ren confuses a rock with a relative of his, Old Man Farmer Höek, whose illusion mockingly convinces Ren to scavenge for food. Ren eats mushrooms and fungi on rocks as well as insects resting under rocks. Stimpy has also gone crazy from Ren's absence, making a statue of him out of earwax.

Ren's mental health substantially worsens; he hears water dripping down envisions his hands melting, torturous visions from his lack of company. He relieves his emotions on a pile of dirt, only for it to resemble Stimpy; he is overjoyed, but is chastised by delusions of the mummy speaking, who mocks him for playing with dirt. He tells Ren to envision his emotions of anger, fear and ignorance (an intellectually disabled being which resembles Stimpy) as his company. Ren "plays" blackjack with them, who either refuse to cooperate or does not understand the game. Ren then claims that Ignorance is cheating with Anger saying that "Your whole life's a cheat!", while Fear retorts that Anger is the "cheat", while Ignorance mishears that they're talking about cheese. This causes Ren to have a Mental disorder and flip the table. He threatens to harm them and destroys the mummified bog man in the process, claiming that he knows about their "plot". Only to be discovered by the Union's leader Jasper, who is delusional enough to be able to see the three emotions; he kicks Ren out for this "companionship". Ren's delusions, the bats and the Union member who led him to his cave salute him as he leaves. Ren returns home where he discovers Stimpy and his Ren statue. They embrace, with both statues doing the same, ending the episode.

A short "Untamed World" interstitial airs after the episode. Stimpy has replaced Ren as host after he was killed by a pair of "Peruvian boot weasels" some time after "Lair of the Lummox". He "spots various species of geezers", in fact invading the privacy of old people including Wilbur Cobb at a retirement home. He invites viewers to join in next week where he finishes his taxidermy of Ren. Due to the interstitial's extremely short length (4 minutes), it is not designated as an episode despite being the only short produced in the season.

== Cast ==
- Billy West and John Kricfalusi (one line reused from "Svën Höek") as Ren
- Billy West as Stimpy, Salesman, The Bogman, Anger, Fear, Ignorance
- Harris Peet as Jasper, Bats
- Jack Carter as Wilbur Cobb

== Production ==
The story for "Hermit Ren" was conceived by Chris Reccardi, who wanted to produce more dramatic episodes after their decline in the third season of the series, with contributions by showrunner Bob Camp, Jim Gomez and artist Bill Wray. It is one of the few episodes with prominent contribution from Reccardi after the series moved from Spümcø to Games Animation. Reccardi stated in an interview that "Hermit Ren was "a great idea for a story that I wish I had another crack at". Reccardi was assisted in his layout drawings by his wife Lynne Naylor and John Kricfalusi's former protégé Michael Kim. "Hermit Ren" was closer in spirit to the first two seasons produced by Spümcø than other episodes of the season with its showcase of intense psychological drama and lower amounts of slapstick comedy. Reccardi, an avid musician, opted to use his own compositions for the episode instead of the series' usual selection of production music, keeping the use of the latter to a minimum. Animation was produced at Rough Draft Korea at Seoul.

== Reception ==
Komorowski gave the episode four out of five stars, praising Chris Reccardi's direction, writing and depiction of Ren's insanity. He criticized the episode's slow pacing and animation, which he considered to be unusually poor for Reccardi's standards.

== Books and articles ==
- Dobbs, G. Michael (2015). Escape – How Animation Broke into the Mainstream in the 1990s. Orlando: BearManor Media. ISBN 978-1593931100.
- Komorowski, Thad (2017). Sick Little Monkeys: The Unauthorized Ren & Stimpy Story. Albany, Georgia: BearManor Media. ISBN 978-1629331836.
