= I Love Chicken =

- The Ren & Stimpy Show episode
- Episode no.: Season 4 Episode 10
- Directed by: Ron Hughart
- Written by: Bob Camp; Jim Gomez
- Original air date: November 19, 1994

Episode chronology
← Previous "A Hard Day's Luck"	Next → "Powdered Toast Man vs. Waffle Woman"

"I Love Chicken" is the tenth episode of the fourth season of The Ren & Stimpy Show. It originally aired on Nickelodeon in the United States on November 19, 1994.

== Plot ==
Ren returns home with groceries while Stimpy greets him, gives him his slippers and pipe, and goes off to cook dinner. He removes the items, a mix of food and human organs, until he finds a whole chicken who he finds attractive. He prepares to bake the chicken, who suddenly responds, being alive, and stares at Stimpy lovingly, convincing him to spare it.

Stimpy dances with the chicken and they almost kiss when Ren, realizing something is not right, checks on him. He demands his dinner while Stimpy pleads with him, claiming the chicken has asked his hand in marriage. Ren is served cornbread stuffing with giblets for dinner, which enrages him; the chicken carries Stimpy off to Las Vegas for their honeymoon. Two weeks later, they return to a hungry Ren, who tries to bake the chicken but is caught by Stimpy on time, despite him disguising a football as the "chicken".

The next day, Ren and the chicken read newspapers. When he sees Stimpy giving the chicken his amenities, he immediately enacts his plan of turning the chicken into sausages. Despite this, Stimpy still treats the sausages as if they are his wife, frustrating Ren. Ren decides to emotionally appeal to Stimpy, to go out for a picnic as a last resort. Stimpy, too stupid to realize, agrees and waits at the picnic site while Ren drives home to retrieve the sausages. He does not suspect anything until night when he hitches a ride home to find Ren devouring the sausages. He falls into a deep depression for six months, when Ren forces him to cook dinner. Ren makes the fatal mistake of buying a goat head, which Stimpy immediately becomes engaged with again, enraging Ren and ending the episode.

== Cast ==
- Billy West as Ren and Stimpy

== Production ==
The story was written by showrunner Bob Camp and Jim Gomez, and was directed by Ron Hughart, who would go on to direct episodes of Futurama and become supervising director for American Dad!. Storyboards were provided by Peter Avanzino, who would also go on to direct episodes of Futurama. Given that this was an obvious I Love Lucy parody, it differed from the usual "gag reel" episodes produced during the Games Animation seasons, focusing heavily on the characters rather than jokes.

== Reception ==
The American critic Thad Komorowski rated the episode four stars out of five, noting that the episode was Camp at his best as he did not direct the episode after writing it, leaving Hughart to take directing duties.

== Books and articles ==
- Dobbs, G. Michael (2015). Escape – How Animation Broke into the Mainstream in the 1990s. Orlando: BearManor Media. ISBN 978-1593931100.
- Komorowski, Thad (2017). Sick Little Monkeys: The Unauthorized Ren & Stimpy Story. Albany, Georgia: BearManor Media. ISBN 978-1629331836.
