= A Friend in Your Face! =

- The Ren & Stimpy Show episode
- Episode no.: Season 4 Episode 3
- Directed by: Bob Camp
- Written by: Bob Camp
- Production code: RS-324
- Original air date: October 8, 1994

Episode chronology
← Previous "House of Next Tuesday"	Next → "Blazing Entrails"

"A Friend in Your Face!" is the third episode of the fourth season of The Ren & Stimpy Show. It originally aired on Nickelodeon in the United States on October 8, 1994.

== Plot ==
Ren is waken up by Stimpy stuffing food into his head for his friend Choo-Choo Nong-Nong Head, a head parasite whom he acquired in the Amazon rainforest. Ren is amused by this idea and goes back to sleep. Choo-Choo answers a phone in the middle of the night when his cousin Nooney Bratweller has come to visit, entering from Stimpy's inwards. Frustrated by his cousin's antics, he convinces him to leave Stimpy for Ren. The first thing Nooney does it to play loud music in Ren's head, who annoys the duo; Stimpy solves this by violently poking Ren's head with a mop.

The next day, Ren is ecstatic upon seeing Stimpy cooking eggs Benedict for breakfast, only to feed them all to Choo-Choo, much to Ren's anger; Nooney and his pig wakes up to the nose, deciding to wrestle in order to make Ren shut up. Ren is tortured by this experience, made worse by the fact that the parasite plants mucus and vermin on his head.

After Ren suffers from manic episodes, Stimpy determines that he has a head parasite and congratulates him. He even climbs into Ren's right ear to party with more parasites. He goes great lengths to remove the parasites; he vacuums and accidentally beats his brain, uses an eel which is devoured by the parasites, and dynamite which blows him up but not the parasites. At night, Nooney cooks in Ren's head and accidentally lights it on fire, with the Fire Chief arriving to put out the fire. Ren's head has been rendered unlivable, which Nooney distastefully leaves, but he demands not to have his head demolished; they instead renovate it into an apartment complex for parasites, which Stimpy celebrates while Ren begrudgingly accepts over death from demolishment.

== Cast ==
- Billy West as Ren and Stimpy
- Judy Bohannon as Choo-Choo Nong-Nong Head
- Stephen DeStefano as Nooney Bratweiler
- Harris Peet as Fire Chief

== Production ==
The episode was animated during early-Summer 1994 in the Rough Draft Studios location of Seoul, South Korea. Storyboards were produced by Stephen DeStefano. DeStefano also provided the voice for Nooney Bratweiler.

== Reception ==
American journalist Thad Komorowski gave the episode two out of five stars, praising the animation but heavily criticizing the story.

== Books and articles ==
- Dobbs, G. Michael (2015). Escape – How Animation Broke into the Mainstream in the 1990s. Orlando: BearManor Media. ISBN 978-1593931100.
- Komorowski, Thad (2017). Sick Little Monkeys: The Unauthorized Ren & Stimpy Story. Albany, Georgia: BearManor Media. ISBN 978-1629331836.
