= Black Hole (The Ren & Stimpy Show) =

- The Ren & Stimpy Show episode
- Episode no.: Season 1 Episode 5b
- Directed by: John Kricfalusi; Bob Camp
- Story by: Bob Camp; Will McRobb
- Production code: RS-06A
- Original air date: February 23, 1992

Episode chronology
← Previous "A Cartoon"	Next → "Stimpy's Invention"

"Black Hole" is the eleventh and penultimate episode of the first season of The Ren & Stimpy Show. It originally aired on Nickelodeon in the United States on February 23, 1992. It is the third and final episode in a loosely linked trilogy known as the "space episodes", set in the show-within-the-show The Adventures of Commander Höek and Cadet Stimpy.

== Plot ==
The episode is yet another episode of The Adventures of Commander Höek and Cadet Stimpy. The actual Ren and Stimpy do not appear.

Commander Höek and Space Cadet Stimpy are once again piloting a spaceship through the depths of space when their ship is unwillingly sucked into a black hole. The duo could do nothing but scream as they became trapped. On the other side of the black hole, Ren and Stimpy find themselves trapped in a strange, surreal world. Ren is relieved that they are alive, only for Stimpy to split into two. Ren demands Stimpy to restore himself by eating his clone.

The duo continue walking until they decide to rest; they detach involuntarily from their torsos, which also affects Stimpy's nose and Ren's eyes. They continue to walk again, where they morph into increasingly off-putting forms.

The duo arrive at a mountain of socks, realizing that it is indeed all the left socks that had been lost in the universe; a primary objective of Ren is to retrieve them in exchange for a million dollars and badges of honor. Despite this, they try to arrive at a bus driving to Jersey City on time, only to be refused for lacking change; they commit suicide by imploding. Stimpy suddenly finds change in his pockets, angering Ren as they both implode to their deaths.

A log commercial airs midway through the episode, this time aimed at young girls.

== Cast ==
- John Kricfalusi as Ren
- Billy West as Stimpy
- Harris Peet as George Liquor and bus driver

== Production ==
The idea for a trilogy that would serve as both a parody of Star Trek and as a show-within-the-show was created during a writing session held during a drinking bout in a bar between John Kricfalusi and Jim Smith. The precise story of the production of "Black Hole" is heavily disputed. Bob Camp claims that he co-directed "Black Hole" – a claim rejected by Kricfalusi, who states he directed "Black Hole" himself. "Black Hole" does not list a director in its credits, which apparently reflected a dispute within Spümcø at the time over who had directed "Black Hole". Camp claims to have served as the co-director, saying he got "his feet wet as a director" on "Black Hole", a claim categorically rejected by Kricfalusi who states that he was the only director on "Black Hole". Kricfalusi explained the lack of a director's credit on "Black Hole" by saying: "A director is somebody who, right from the start of a story, follows it all the way through to the end, and it's his idea and vision". Will McRobb, co-creator of Nickelodeon's The Adventures of Pete & Pete, provided the story for the episode alongside Bob Camp.

== Reception ==
The critic Kendra Ackeman listed "Black Hole" as one of the best of the show, with an "entertaining" and surreal story. By contrast, American journalist Thad Komorowski gave the episode three out of five stars, noting its incoherence and substitution of substance with humor were its demerits.

Karen Schomer, the television critic of the New York Times, wrote in 1992 about "Black Hole": "... Ren and Stimpy go for a ride on a spaceship and wind up getting sucked into a black hole. This never happened to Bart Simpson. In the strange world beyond the black hole's vortex, logs and roasted chickens float through the air, and giant eight balls perch atop crags of rock. Ren and Stimpy's bodies begin to come apart, and their eyeballs drift off their faces. They climb a mountain that turns out to be composed of missing left socks. Their last chance for escape fails when a bus marked "Jersey City" comes by and refuses them entry because they lack exact change. 'What'll happen to us?', Stimpy wails. "We'll probably continue to mutate," says Ren." Schomer described "Black Hole" as a bleak episode that was unlike any other cartoon show in the United States.

Animation expert Martin Goodman wrote: "On a surface level, they were funny, subversive cartoons with an offbeat retro look, but a deeper examination revealed them to be an encapsulation of some of our darkest fears, ones in which the soul and body are powerless against a world out of balance. Perhaps the most striking example of this was the episode "Black Hole," which finds the duo stranded on a bizarre, hostile planet; they begin to mutate into progressively hideous versions of themselves before imploding at the end of the cartoon."

== Books and articles ==
- Dobbs, G. Michael (2015). Escape – How Animation Broke into the Mainstream in the 1990s. Orlando: BearManor Media. ISBN 978-1593931100.
- Komorowski, Thad (2017). Sick Little Monkeys: The Unauthorized Ren & Stimpy Story. Albany, Georgia: BearManor Media. ISBN 978-1629331836.
