= It's a Dog's Life (The Ren & Stimpy Show) =

- The Ren & Stimpy Show episode
- Episode no.: Season 4 Episode 12
- Directed by: Ken Bruce
- Written by: Bob Camp; Jim Gomez
- Production code: RS-408
- Original air date: December 3, 1994

Episode chronology
← Previous "Powdered Toast Man vs. Waffle Woman"	Next → "Eggyölkeo"

"It's a Dog's Life" is the twelfth episode of the fourth season of The Ren & Stimpy Show. It originally aired on Nickelodeon in the United States on December 3, 1994.

== Plot ==
A homeless Ren and Stimpy are caught again and sent to the dog pound, where they are sent to their imminent death. They are saved by an unnamed rich and senile lady (Granny) on the verge of death while a priest ordains them in a gas chamber. The duo feed themselves in Granny's limousine, grateful of their survival, when the woman decides to name them "Abraham" and "Levictus" which they reluctantly allow.

The duo settle at their new home. Ren decides to shake hands with a dog he believes is a fellow pet. At first, Ren assumes the dog is sleeping and attempts to wake him up, only to discover that he is dead; Granny explains that the dog is a previous pet of hers named Ezekiel who died in his sleep, so his corpse was freeze-dried in a successful attempt of taxidermy. Suddenly, the duo are condemned by the lady for being apparently possessed, despite acting normal for their kind, as they are handed off to the lady's butler Mr. Hao, a stereotypical Chinese muscular man who beats them to a pulp.

The duo, who cannot walk normally after the beating, are forced to eat literal rocks advertised as dog food. Ren breaks his teeth doing so while Stimpy chokes on it; Ren's unsuccessful attempt of the Heimlich maneuver is seen as a threat by Granny, who sprays Stimpy with water and forces him to spit. She sends them to a veterinarian who further harms them.

The duo sleep in the living room when Granny forcibly moves them to the yard; they find that it is a cemetery for her pets. Scared, they decide to escape by pushing a weirdly unstable brick, which causes another to crush on Ren; Stimpy assists him after getting out. They run as quickly as they can, only to stumble on a policeman, who almost decides to send them to the dog pound again until Ren reveals his address. They return to see Granny dead from lead poisoning; it is implied that Mr. Hao killed her, as a lead pipe is dropped while he speaks and he embodies everyone, including a goldfish, in Granny's will except for the duo, who are instead euthanized, freeze dried and used as statues in the residence alongside Granny. Mr. Hao goes off to enjoy his newfound wealth after dusting the statues, ending the episode.

== Cast ==
- Billy West as Ren, Stimpy, Granny, and Mr. Hao
- Bob Camp as The Dog Catcher

== Production ==
The episode was a remake of the banned 1992 episode "Man's Best Friend", with Granny serving as a female alternative of George Liquor. Director Ken Bruce was previously co-director of "The Great Outdoors", being credited with Vincent Waller whom he replaced after Waller left production; this is his second directorial effort. The Dog Catcher from "Big House Blues" returns, but showrunner Bob Camp voices him as original voice actor Jim Smith had left during production of the second season. As a rarity for its production, the episode was animated by Wang Film Productions in Taiwan. The episode was heavily censored to remove many of the scenes of cruelty being inflicted on Ren and Stimpy by Granny.

== Reception ==
The American critic Thad Komorowski rated the episode two and a half out of five stars, noting that it is significantly less funny than its predecessor and its cruel nature serves as its worst aspect.

== Books and articles ==
- Dobbs, G. Michael (2015). Escape – How Animation Broke into the Mainstream in the 1990s. Orlando: BearManor Media. ISBN 978-1593931100.
- Finley, Laura L. (2018). Violence in Popular Culture American and Global Perspectives. Santa Monica: ABC-CLIO. ISBN 9781440854330.
- Komorowski, Thad (2017). Sick Little Monkeys: The Unauthorized Ren & Stimpy Story. Albany, Georgia: BearManor Media. ISBN 978-1629331836.
