= Fire Dogs =

- The Ren & Stimpy Show episode
- Episode no.: Season 1 Episode 8
- Directed by: John Kricfalusi
- Story by: John Kricfalusi
- Production code: RS-04B
- Original air date: September 29, 1991

Episode chronology
← Previous "The Littlest Giant"	Next → "Marooned"

"Fire Dogs" is the eighth episode of the first season of The Ren & Stimpy Show. It originally aired on Nickelodeon in the United States on September 29, 1991.

== Plot ==
A homeless and starving Ren and Stimpy roam the streets, where Ren devours the last morsel of Stimpy's cat litter; he is horrified to find out despite enjoying it, and breaks Stimpy's litter box much to Stimpy's chagrin. Suddenly the duo find a job notice recruiting dogs by the Fire Department, which allows only Dalmatian dogs for the job. Fortunately, Ren has a bucket of "Dalmatian Paint" that allows both him and Stimpy to be painted the colors of Dalmatian dogs.

The duo apply for the job, only to be attacked violently by the Fire Chief, who had mistaken the duo for circus midgets. While applying for the job, Stimpy lets slip that he's a cat, but Ren saves him by noting his relative stupidity to the Fire Chief. The duo are hired as firefighters, despite Dalmatians being traditionally used as assisting positions. Stimpy looks forward to work, while Ren uses the opportunity to eat and relax, noting that the odds of a fire is quite low, only for them to be assigned their first mission. A fire breaks at an apartment building and the duo are assigned to evacuating the Buttloaves family. Mrs. Buttloaves throws her baby out of the window, who is revealed to be comically obese, but the weight is fairly manageable for the duo. Her horse, revealed to be Mr. Horse, makes the grave mistake of landing on his feet, breaking both of his feet and landing on top of the duo; he is forced to drag himself to safety despite the extreme pain.

Ren and Stimpy try to save Mrs. Buttloaves' increasingly absurd collection of animals, who are all of gigantic stature to the point Ren refuses to hold up the stretcher. When it is time to save Mrs. Buttloaves, Ren rides the ladder to her residence, only to be horrified by the height; Mrs. Buttloaves holds Ren in her mouth as she descends, causing a massive earthquake that destroyed buildings and a crater in place of the original apartment. Grateful for the rescue, she practices cardiopulmonary resuscitation on an unconscious Ren, who mistook it for a kiss and is horrified by her appearance. Stimpy puts out the fire with a massive pile of kitty litter. The duo are rewarded for their bravery with golden fire hydrant helmets, only for Mrs. Buttloaves and some dogs appear nearby, barely holding the urge to urinate.

An "Ask Dr. Stupid" segment airs midway in the episode, where Stimpy answers a boy's question about school in a nonsensical way.

== Cast ==
- John Kricfalusi as Ren, Mr. Horse and Mrs. Buttloaves
- Billy West as Stimpy and the news reporter
- Harris Peet as the Fire Chief
- Cheryl Chase as the baby

== Production ==
John Kricfalusi stated that "Fire Dogs" wrote it "in an afternoon" as to fill the quota of episodes ordered for the first season in October 1990. Bob Camp called "Fire Dogs" as a "regular cartoon, lots of mayhem and running around and physical humor. It's not the usual bizarre fare". The episode was by all accounts rushed in production at the Spümcø studio with as little work as done as possible. Instead of being drawn in and painted at the usual sub-contractors for the first season, namely Lacewood Productions in Ottawa or Carbunkle Cartoons in Vancouver, the task was sub-contracted out to Fil-Cartoons at Manila to save costs. Despite the rush, "Fire Dogs" was still finished late. Much of the footage intended for "Fire Dogs" was vandalized beyond repair at Fil-Cartoons, with Kricfalusi and Carbunkle founder Bob Jaques, who worked as animation director on the episode, voicing their displeasure towards their work.

== Reception ==
American journalist Thad Komorowski gave the episode four out of five stars. American critic Andy Patrizio praised "Fire Dogs" as an "insane" episode that was his favorite of the first season.

== Sequel ==
An episode of Ren & Stimpy "Adult Party Cartoon", named "Fire Dogs 2", takes place directly after this episode. The Fire Chief magically morphs into Ralph Bakshi (voiced by himself) and invites the duo to stay with him. It was initially written as an episode of the second season of the original during the Nickelodeon years, but was rejected by story editor Will McRobb for its crudeness.

== Books and articles ==
- Dobbs, G. Michael (2015). Escape – How Animation Broke into the Mainstream in the 1990s. Orlando: BearManor Media. ISBN 978-1593931100.
- Komorowski, Thad (2017). Sick Little Monkeys: The Unauthorized Ren & Stimpy Story. Albany, Georgia: BearManor Media. ISBN 978-1629331836.
