= Eggyölkeo =

- The Ren & Stimpy Show episode
- Episode no.: Season 4 Episode 13
- Directed by: Bob Camp
- Written by: Bill Wray; Jim Gomez
- Production code: RS-407
- Original air date: December 3, 1994

Episode chronology
← Previous "It's a Dog's Life"	Next → "Double Header"

"Eggyölkeo" is the thirteenth episode of the fourth season of The Ren & Stimpy Show. It originally aired on Nickelodeon in the United States on December 3, 1994.

== Plot ==
Ren and Stimpy portray Renwaldo and Stimpleton yet again. Renwaldo, an "eggsmith", is unfulfilled after a lifetime of making and repairing eggs for the rich. Desiring a son of his own, he makes one out of egg yolks. He is blessed with two buttons as eyes (which fall into his body), Renwaldo's scalp and unused part of brain, as well as pants from a corpse Stimpleton was ordered to retrieve. Unfortunately, the "son" melts instantaneously, so Renwaldo goes to bed disappointed and prays for the slight chance of his "son" being alive. He rudely ends the prayer before sleeping, while Stimpleton is forced to sleep in a locked cage.

In the middle of the night, a beheaded chicken fairy arrives to bless Renwaldo's "son" with salt. In the morning, Stimpleton watches television with the newly sentient "son", only for Renwaldo to notice; after he yelps, he is amazed by his "success" and names the child Eggyölkeo. He accidentally beheads Eggyölkeo after holding him up to the ceiling fan but restores him. At breakfast, Renwaldo teaches Eggyölkeo how to use a spoon, which he successfully imitates by eating a part of his body.

Renwaldo teaches Eggyölkeo how to drive a luxury car he owns, which he does perfectly but crashes on multiple rubbish bins. He is being stalked by an anthropomorphic toast and bacon, who abduct him at night from his bed in the refrigerator. He is forced to drive to the "Island of Lost Meals" while a devastated Renwaldo makes another replica out of fruit. He drinks a mix of ketchup and baking soda before throwing a tantrum from his loss. Stimpleton lands on him while eating a hot dog, unfazed by the events that happened. At the Island of Lost Meals, which is a bar attended by anthropomorphic food, the toast and bacon make Eggyölkeo "walk the skillet" into a pan of boiling butter, but is stopped when a Colonel appears to handle illicit activities. The toast and bacon give Eggyölkeo to him in order to be spared but are instead eaten.

Months later, Renwaldo and Stimpleton had been sitting in the same spot for so long plants and fungi grow on them, only for Renwaldo to see an advertisement for Eggyölkeo performing in Las Vegas. He arrives to see Eggyölkeo dressed as Elvis Presley and performing various dance moves to rabid fans; while they devout him as a sign of affection, Renwaldo manages to recover the head and flee. He puts Eggyölkeo, who calls Renwaldo his father and loves him, in the refrigerator while he cradles it. The next day, he finds Stimpleton eating an egg sandwich from a combination of Eggyölkeo and mayonnaise, much to Renwaldo's horror; Eggyölkeo professes his love of Renwaldo before being swallowed, ending the episode.

== Cast ==
- Billy West as Ren, Stimpy, Eggyölkeo, and Colonel Strombolio
- Harris Peet as Chicken

== Production ==
The production of the episode, a parody of Disney's Pinocchio, was "notorious for its descent into utter chaos". Storyboarder Stephen DeStefano stated: "It was going to be my Ren & Stimpy masterpiece. And once it was finished, I realized it didn't really work as a cartoon or as a storyboard". The story was intended to be half an hour long, but the network insisted on cutting its running time to 11 minutes, which threw the production into chaos and led to a story that makes little sense. Much like its sister episode, "It's a Dog's Life", the episode was animated by Wang Film Productions in Taiwan, whose work was not up to the standards of other sub-contractors on The Ren & Stimpy Show such as the Carbunkle studio of Vancouver or the Rough Draft Studios location in Seoul, South Korea, the latter of which was notorious for the show's notable decline in quality.

== Reception ==
American critic Thad Komorowski rated the episode two out of five stars. Komorowski wrote that the episode was an unfunny and confusing story that was very difficult to watch and enjoy, and its animation quality made the episode worse.

== Books and articles ==
- Dobbs, G. Michael (2015). Escape – How Animation Broke into the Mainstream in the 1990s. Orlando: BearManor Media. ISBN 978-1593931100.
- Komorowski, Thad (2017). Sick Little Monkeys: The Unauthorized Ren & Stimpy Story. Albany, Georgia: BearManor Media. ISBN 978-1629331836.
