= Space Madness =

- The Ren & Stimpy Show episode
- Episode no.: Season 1 Episode 3a
- Directed by: John Kricfalusi
- Story by: John Kricfalusi; Jim Gomez
- Production code: RS-03A
- Original air date: September 8, 1991

Episode chronology
← Previous "Nurse Stimpy"	Next → "The Boy Who Cried Rat!"

"Space Madness" is the fifth episode of the first season of The Ren & Stimpy Show. It originally aired on Nickelodeon in the United States on September 8, 1991. Along with "Marooned" and "Black Hole", the episode is part of a loose trilogy in the first season known as the "space episodes", centering around the show-within-the-show, a parody of science fiction shows titled The Adventures of Commander Höek and Cadet Stimpy.

In the episode, Ren and Stimpy appear as fictionalized science fiction versions of themselves living in a spacecraft for 36 years. After discovering they have no duties for six years, Ren descends into "space madness", becoming detached from reality before Stimpy restrains him. The scene then switches to Ren assigning Stimpy to protect the History Eraser Button but becomes tempted to push it by the episode's announcer, causing everything to be erased from existence.

"Space Madness" was written in 1990 and pitched the following year, later being sub-contracted out to Carbunkle Cartoons in Vancouver, the first episode not to be animated by Lacewood Productions. During its production, the animation studio gave the episode a more cinematic quality unusual in American animated TV series at the time. The episode was received positively by critics for its surreal plot and voice acting and is considered to be one of the series' best and most popular episodes. Author and critic Thad Komorowski considered the episode to be when The Ren & Stimpy Show received noticeable popularity.

== Plot ==
An excerpt from "Space Madness" where Commander Höek eats a bar of soap after showing signs of the titular "space madness".

The episode begins with Ren and Stimpy watching their favorite fictional science-fiction series, The Adventures of Commander Höek and Cadet Stimpy, which stars fictionalized versions of themselves. In the episode-within-the-episode, Commander Höek and Cadet Stimpy are the crew of a spacecraft, which they've been in for 36 years, traveling to the Crab Nebula. After discovering that they have no duties for six years, the two attempt to occupy themselves during their prolonged period of isolation.

The monotony of the period gradually causes Ren to develop signs of "space madness". Stimpy attempts to comfort him by preparing a meal of space food and later allowing him to take a bath, but Ren becomes increasingly detached from reality. As the body of water disperses along with Ren, he becomes convinced that a bar of soap is an ice cream bar. Upon Stimpy's notice, Ren believes that Stimpy is trying to take it from him, before intimidating him by forcefully brushing his own teeth with a toothbrush. Concerned, Stimpy eventually restrains Ren on the ground.

Ren then records a captain's log in which he mistakenly identifies Stimpy as having "space madness". He assigns Stimpy to guard the History Eraser Button, a seemingly nonsensical yet highly destructive device. The episode's announcer repeatedly attempts to pressure Stimpy into pressing it, eventually succeeding. When Stimpy activates the button, the characters, their spaceship, and the surrounding reality are erased from existence. The episode concludes with the series' logo appearing before it disappears, implying that the device has affected the episode itself. A fictional advertisement for Sugar Frosted Milk airs midway through the episode.

== Cast ==
- John Kricfalusi as Ren
- Billy West as Stimpy

== Production ==
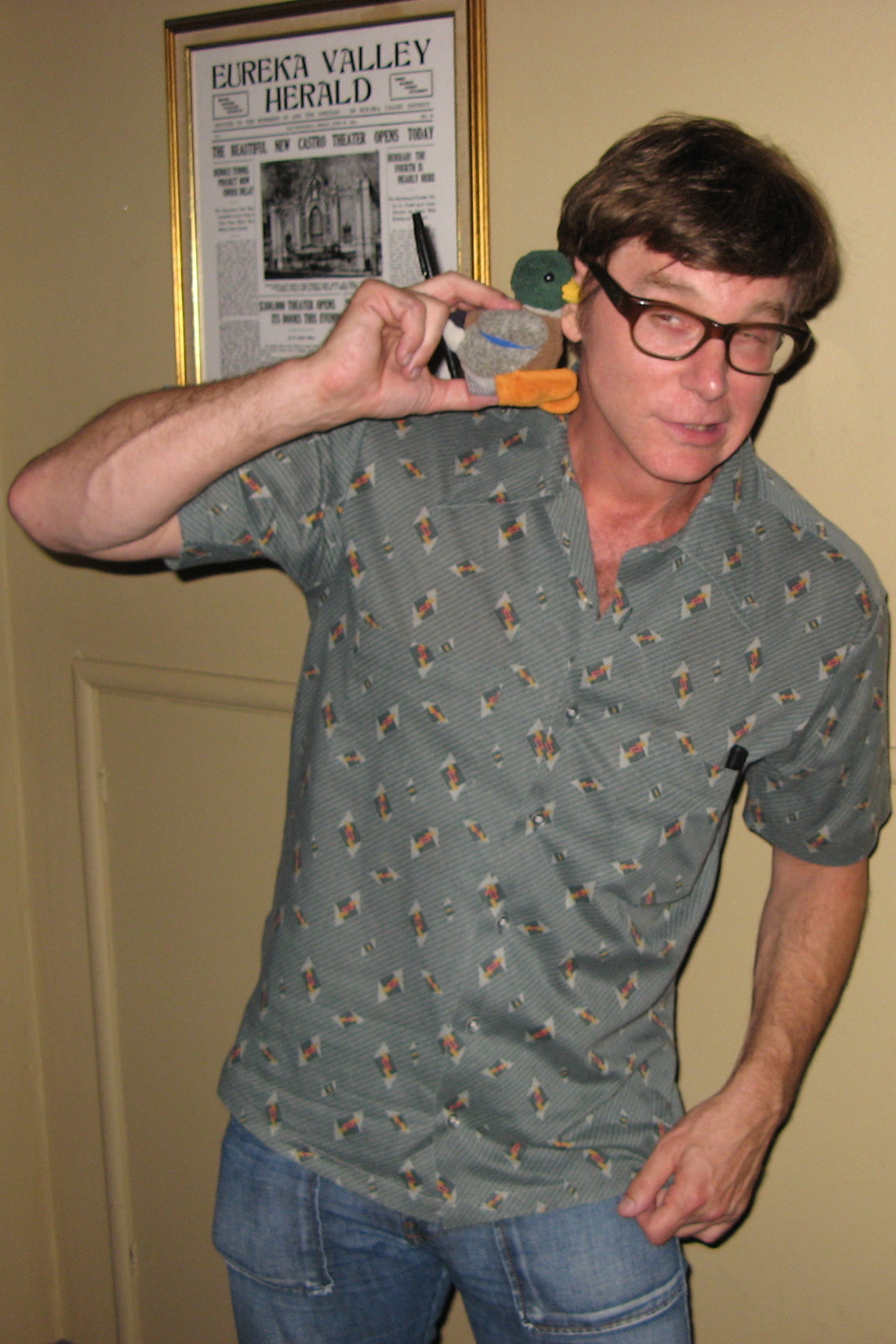
Series creator John Kricfalusi revealed in 2008 that "Space Madness" was rejected by Nickelodeon.

The story was conceived in 1990 at Spümcø and was pitched in the spring of 1991. "Space Madness" served as the debut appearance of the show's recurring character later known as the Salesman, sometimes known as "That Guy". Series creator John Kricfalusi stated in a 2008 interview that "Stimpy's Invention" and "Space Madness" were both rejected by Nickelodeon but turned out to be the two most popular episodes of the series. By June 1991, the task of animating for the episode had been sub-contracted out to Carbunkle Cartoons in Vancouver; it was the first episode in the series to be animated by Carbunkle Cartoons and the first to not be animated by Lacewood Productions. Author and critic Thad Komorowski wrote that much of the quality of the episode was due to the work of Carbunkle Cartoons, which gave the episode a cinematic quality that was unusual in American animated TV series. Jim Smith and Chris Reccardi were responsible for the storyboards. Jim Gomez, a layout artist on the series and an instrumental crew member of both the Spümcø and Games Animation seasons, helped write the story.

There was much tension between Bob Jaques, the chief of Carbunkle Cartoons who served as the animation director for the episode, and Kricfalusi. Jaques complained about the scene where Ren floats in his body of water while eating the soap bar that Kricfalusi tried to redraw the scene after sending it to Carbunkle to be drawn in. Jaques stated: "The design of the water varied from layout to layout, so, per the rules, we followed the layouts. He could have sent the footage back for changes, but it was the growing OCD in him that made him want to touch stuff that was beyond his skill level". The task of coloring in "Space Madness" was assigned to Fil-Cartoons Studio in Manila. Fil-Cartoons' work was described to be even worse than Lacewood Productions' output; Kricfalusi despised working with the studio for their incompetence, and Jaques felt that Fil-Cartoons' cheap, subpar performance ruined his enjoyment of the episode. It made things worse as the studio would animate the sister episode that followed, "The Boy Who Cried Rat!". "Space Madness" serves as the beginning of a sci-fi trilogy in The Ren & Stimpy Show, preceding "Marooned" and "Black Hole".

== Reception ==
Komorowski gave the episode five out of five stars, considering it to be one of the best episodes in the series. He wrote that "Space Madness" was the "first genuine masterpiece" of The Ren & Stimpy Show and was the episode that made the show popular. Critic Jonathan Barkan praised "Space Madness" along with its sequel "Marooned", that "played almost like demented Star Trek episodes". AJ Aronstein of Vulture described the episode as representing a "sense of the real and the fictional", conflating reality with a cartoon world to an "entirely different dimension." As of 2021, Kendra Ackerman of Screen Rant reported that the episode (paired with "The Boy Who Cried Rat!") was the second-highest rated episode of The Ren & Stimpy Show on iMDB, scoring a 9 out 10.

In 2021, Rob Harvilla of The Ringer wrote that "Space Madness" was one of the best of the show, that features a surreal plot and Ren's colorful insults to Stimpy such as "you bloated sack of protoplasm!" Harvilla praised the voice acting in "Space Madness" as "phenomenal", writing that both John Kricfalusi and Billy West performed their characters with "stupendous, indelible voices". Harvilla wrote that he greatly enjoyed "Space Madness" along with the rest of The Ren & Stimpy Show growing up in the early 1990s but argued that his enjoyment of the show today is tainted by the sexual abuse allegations against Kricfalusi that came out in 2018.

== Books ==
- Klickstein, Matthew; Summers, Marc (2013). Slimed! An Oral History of Nickelodeon's Golden Age. London: Penguin Publishing Group. ISBN 9781101614099.
- Komorowski, Thad (2017). Sick Little Monkeys: The Unauthorized Ren & Stimpy Story. Albany, Georgia: BearManor Media. ISBN 978-1629331836.
