= Magical Golden Singing Cheeses =

- The Ren & Stimpy Show episode
- Episode no.: Season 4 Episode 8
- Directed by: Michael Kim
- Written by: Bob Camp; Jim Gomez
- Story by: John Kricfalusi (uncredited)
- Production code: RS-404
- Original air date: November 11, 1994

Episode chronology
← Previous "Farm Hands"	Next → "A Hard Day's Luck"

"Magical Golden Singing Cheeses" is the eighth episode of the fourth season of The Ren & Stimpy Show. It originally aired on Nickelodeon in the United States on November 11, 1994.

== Plot ==
Ren and Stimpy portray Renwaldo and Stimpleton, two poor peasants in the Kingdom of Fie, a land suffering from a serious drought. They had not eaten since the last crusade, so Renwaldo asks Stimpleton to trade the family chigger for food. He agrees and sets off.

Stimpleton searches far and wide until he comes across the Man-Eating Village Idiot, a jester in a pillory who offers "Magical Golden Singing Cheeses" in exchange for the chigger, but not before they compete with their stupidity; if Stimpleton loses he will be devoured. He goes first by painfully maiming his arm with a grater, scrubbing the wound with a lemon and ends by pouring an entire salt shaker on the wound. Stimpleton responds by backtracking to a cold environment and licks a frozen tree, ripping his tongue off. Livid, the Village Idiot decides to go further by starting a car while it is still being refilled, causing an explosion. He is defeated when Stimpleton retaliates by throwing himself onto a pig while holding corn, causing him to be maimed to near death. He recovers while the Village Idiot has a panic attack from Stimpleton outdoing his stupidity.

Stimpleton leaves with the cheeses while the Village Idiot dies of a heart attack from "stupidity". Renwaldo is not impressed by the unripe cheese, demanding Stimpleton to ripen it by burying it in the stable. He digs deeper to build a cave for the cheese to ripen, only to find a one-eyed ogre resting underground. He tries to make the cheeses resemble shoes to convince the ogre not to eat it, but the ogre nevertheless wears them and likes it. Stimpleton returns to the surface without telling Renwaldo of this.

Six months later, the duo are even more malnourished than ever before. Renwaldo remembers the cheeses and demands Stimpleton to retrieve them. Stimpleton does so, with the ogre resting yet again while wearing the cheeses. As they are still stuck to his feet, Stimpleton uses a crowbar to pry the ogre's toenail off. The ogre reacts on pain, but agrees to trade the cheeses as his feet had grown over them. He accepts a kidney, which Stimpleton has in his pocket instead of his spleen, and gives him spare change: three kidney stones, a tapeworm and his gallbladder. Stimpleton races home with the cheeses, with Renwaldo, reacting in disgust, calls it the best and stinkiest cheese he had ever seen. However, one bite results in the cheese turning into milk curd princesses, whom they were before being cursed. They are forcibly married before dying of starvation, ending the episode.

== Cast ==
- Billy West as Ren, Stimpy, the ogre, the Village Idiot

== Production ==
The episode was based on various jokes by John Kricfalusi and Jim Gomez in the 1980s about a fractured fairy tale the two had came up with. At Spümcø, Kricfalusi and Gomez would pitch the episode, a possible "Stimpy's Storybook Land" episode, to Nickelodeon as part of the series' first season, being rejected due to its graphic violence. After Kricfalusi's firing in 1992, Gomez would rework the episode with showrunner Bob Camp for the fourth season; Kricfalusi's former protégé Michael Kim would serve as director. He was disinterested by the story, but was nevertheless committed to the task. This is the first episode to be animated by Korean-American studio Toon-Us-In at Los Angeles, led by animation director Andy Kim Yoon-dae (no relation to Mike Kim). It was also the first episode to involve Tom McGrath as storyboard artist.

== Reception ==
American critic Thad Komorowski gave the episode three out of five stars, praising its animation but noted that the story suffered from Kim's disinterest.

== Books and articles ==
- Dobbs, G. Michael (2015). Escape – How Animation Broke into the Mainstream in the 1990s. Orlando: BearManor Media. ISBN 978-1593931100.
- Komorowski, Thad (2017). Sick Little Monkeys: The Unauthorized Ren & Stimpy Story. Albany, Georgia: BearManor Media. ISBN 978-1629331836.
