= A Hard Day's Luck =

- The Ren & Stimpy Show episode
- Episode no.: Season 4 Episode 9
- Directed by: Chris Reccardi
- Story by: Chris Reccardi; Lynne Naylor; Vince Calandra
- Original air date: November 11, 1994

Guest appearance
- Alan Young as Haggis MacHaggis

Episode chronology
← Previous "Magical Golden Singing Cheeses"	Next → "I Love Chicken"

"A Hard Day's Luck" is the ninth episode of the fourth season of The Ren & Stimpy Show. It originally aired on Nickelodeon in the United States on November 11, 1994.

== Plot ==
Haggis MacHaggis wakes up on a sunny morning. He looks into a mirror, disappointed yet again by his hair loss. He tries to obtain a wig by foolishly putting tape on his butler Myron's body hair. Myron, who doubles as Haggis' bed, agrees to let him do so. Unfortunately, the tape does not stick to Haggis as expected, disappointing him.

Haggis prepares to eat his breakfast, Lucky Charms. Alongside the cereal is a charm in the shape of a leprechaun, which can be activated by adding water. A literal leprechaun appears, which Haggis tries to evict in horror (due to his hate of Irish culture), but relents as the leprechaun promises to make his wish come true if he passes through trials. He prepares to make Haggis do his first trial of jumping off the pool, only for Myron's hand, which they were standing on, to break under their weight.

The first real trial, starting after the duo escape from the moat full of Crocostimpys, is for Haggis to not lose his temper. The leprechaun threatens to acquire Myron's ownership shall he lose. The trial starts with Myron playing opera music while the leprechaun openly insults Haggis and pulls his three remaining hair. One lands on Haggis' eye, causing him great pain. The second is stuck between his teeth, which Haggis cannot floss it out. The third is placed in his ear, with the leprechaun adding ear mites to increase the damage done. He clearly fails the test, beating Myron to relieve his anger despite not showing it. He is forced to hand over Myron.

The leprechaun gives him a second trial of generosity. He refuses to give away his entire wealth, but a clam who begs for spare change for a bus ride to the ocean serves as his alternate trial. He lifts his wallet, a heavy locked metal container, and extracts half a pence (literally split in half), which he refuses to give away and instead throws the clam to the surrounding waters. The clam loses his shell and underpants in the flight. Haggis is forced to hand over his entire wealth, including his clothes but not including his shillelagh.

The leprechaun gives him one last chance, a trial of bravery. Haggis claims that he can handle giant beasts, but the trial instead forces him to face the dark. He is dropped into a well, with him winning if he spends more than a minute under without coming up. He spends all his time below, growing increasingly worried by the trick the leprechaun is pulling. He finally decides to light a match, only to find numerous skeletons resembling him and a monster requesting to have his cigar lit. Horrified, he races up with his body lagging behind his brain. He begs not to have his shillelagh taken after he misses the mark by a second. The leprechaun, realizing he had gone too far in torturing his client, decides to let him have his wish granted and return his assets; he grows a giant hair after eating a grubby "lucky bean", Overjoyed, Haggis runs off to the sunset as he literally explodes in happiness, ending the episode.

== Cast ==
- Alan Young as Haggis MacHaggis
- Billy West as Myron and the Leprechaun

== Production ==
The episode alternatively served as a pilot episode for a spin-off series starring Haggis that never got off the ground, so Ren and Stimpy did not appear in the story in a way to test the appeal to audiences of a story that only featured Haggis. Chris Reccardi, who created the character of Haggis, directed the episode. American critic Thad Komorowski wrote that the episode actively goes against Reccardi's strengths as he was talented at dramatic moments, but not at comedy. The episode was illustrated by the Rough Draft Korea studio in Seoul. The scene where Haggis tosses aside a clam rather give him a quarter out of greed was censored in the home media release.

== Reception ==
Komorowski rated the episode four out of five stars, noting that the episode did not suffer from Reccardi's lack of skill in comedy, instead complimenting his abilities in showing Haggis' suffering.

== Books and articles ==
- Dobbs, G. Michael (2015). Escape – How Animation Broke into the Mainstream in the 1990s. Orlando: BearManor Media. ISBN 978-1593931100.
- Komorowski, Thad (2017). Sick Little Monkeys: The Unauthorized Ren & Stimpy Story. Albany, Georgia: BearManor Media. ISBN 978-1629331836.
