= Marooned (The Ren & Stimpy Show) =

- The Ren & Stimpy Show episode
- Episode no.: Season 1 Episode 5a
- Directed by: John Kricfalusi
- Story by: John Kricfalusi
- Production code: RS-05B
- Original air date: October 6, 1991

Episode chronology
← Previous "Fire Dogs"	Next → "A Cartoon"

"Marooned" is the ninth episode of the first season of The Ren & Stimpy Show. It originally aired on Nickelodeon in the United States on October 6, 1991. It is the second episode in a loosely linked trilogy known as the "space episodes", set in the show-within-the-show The Adventures of Commander Höek and Cadet Stimpy.

== Plot ==
The episode is yet another episode of The Adventures of Commander Höek and Cadet Stimpy that casts Ren and Stimpy as astronauts going farther into space than any other dog and cat before. Due to the show's loosely connected structure, it ignores the events of "Space Madness". The introduction is also reused from that episode.

Commander Ren and Space Cadet Stimpy crash their spacecraft into a remote planet, with the atmosphere stripping the spacecraft beyond repair. They try to contact upper management, to no avail, as their equipment had fried in the process. Stimpy tries to ensure their survival by following rules in his Space Cadet Handbook.

The duo scout for weeks until they almost run out of food. Stimpy tries to read up on how to find food, only to try eating the handbook and be stopped by Ren. Stimpy tries to testing the planet's eccentric fauna and flora to see if they are edible, but ends up not understanding the technology. The testing device fries after being pointed at Ren.

Ren waits for Stimpy to serve a meal, who ends up cooking what looks like an appetizing piece of cabbage. Ren is satisfied, only for the cabbage to reveal its true nature as a beast, promptly biting into Ren's head.

At night, Stimpy is awoken by the bright moonlight, appreciating the sight of the Moon and asks Ren to wake up to do so. Ren reluctantly does so, only to find that the Moon is literally hanging next to their tent. Ren is injured by hitting his head on the Moon and angrily straps Stimpy to a straitjacket as punishment. Another night, Ren is awoken to the sound of knocking. He finds an attractive and realistic female Chihuahua at the door, making Ren instantly smitten. Stimpy sees a giant bag of kitty litter, which he is also charmed by. It is in fact the doing of a giant creature who lure the duo with hallucinations and captures them with its tentacle. Ren and Stimpy fall into the insides of a second creature, where aliens descend and attempt to eat them. Stimpy tries to find a way out, only for the handbook to say they are doomed. Ren slaps Stimpy, much to the aliens' enjoyment, and delaying the duo's imminent death.

== Cast ==
- John Kricfalusi as Ren
- Billy West as Stimpy and Announcer/Salesman
- Cheryl Chase as the sexy chihuahua

== Production ==
The idea for the trilogy known as the "space episodes" that would serve as both a parody of Star Trek and as a show-within-the-show was created during a writing session held during a drinking bout in a bar between John Kricfalusi and Jim Smith. The storyboard for the episode was done by Chris Reccardi. Kent Butterworth, an animator who worked closely with Ralph Bakshi, was alleged to have worked as an uncredited freelancer on the episode and was blamed for the episode's slow pacing, but he denies he ever worked on "Marooned". "Marooned" was finished late and aired months after the date selected for its premiere, and was one of the many major examples of Kricfalusi's unprofessional manner.

== Reception ==
Critic Jonathan Barkan praised "Marooned" and its predecessor "Space Madness", that "played almost like demented Star Trek episodes". American critic Dawn Taylor rated "Marooned" as one of the best episodes of the first season. By contrast, American critic Thad Komorowski rated the episode zero out of five stars (the bomb rating), noting that its slow pacing killed any chance of it being a decent episode.

== Books and articles ==
- Dobbs, G. Michael (2015). Escape – How Animation Broke into the Mainstream in the 1990s. Orlando: BearManor Media. ISBN 978-1593931100.
- Komorowski, Thad (2017). Sick Little Monkeys: The Unauthorized Ren & Stimpy Story. Albany, Georgia: BearManor Media. ISBN 978-1629331836.
