= House of Next Tuesday =

- The Ren & Stimpy Show episode
- Episode no.: Season 4 Episode 2
- Directed by: Ron Hughart
- Written by: Ron Hauge; Peter Avanzino
- Production code: RS-312
- Original air date: October 8, 1994

Episode chronology
← Previous "Hermit Ren"	Next → "A Friend in Your Face!"

"House of Next Tuesday" is the second episode of the fourth season of The Ren & Stimpy Show. It originally aired on Nickelodeon in the United States on October 8, 1994.

== Plot ==
The House of Next Tuesday is a futuristic house advertised to be able to exterminate giant ants, control the inner climate (a man murders his roommate so he can enjoy a snowy indoors climate), and douse obnoxious salesman robots with honey, which in turn attracts giant ants to be terminated. Ren and Stimpy intend to buy the house after the Salesman convinces them, to whom they slam the door in favor of a 10-day free trial.

The duo first try out "future meat", overjoyed when they discover a machine named "Jerky-2000". They try "Sweet 'N Sour Jerky"; it engulfs Ren, as it needs flesh to proceed. Ren is tortured in the device while being made into jerky, which Stimpy attempts to devour. Ren goes for a food preparation device, where Stimpy attracts his attention by promising seafood. The device does deliver on its promise by bringing them pre-digested plankton from a blue whale, much to Ren's chagrin.

Ren goes to the toilet, where he is creeped out by the freezing cold seat; Stimpy demonstrates a toilet seat warmer, which is in fact a morbidly obese human sitting on it for a few minutes for it to be warm. Ren comfortably goes to the toilet afterwards, with the stench of his waste being so foul even the female computer assistant voice tries its best not to breathe. Stimpy shows off a "television of the future", a television in a helmet where "the user is placed into the action"; Ren tries it, delightful when he embodies a chef cooking meals in a television show, only to be envisioned as a lobster dunked into scalding lobster. This proves to be traumatic to Ren.

At night, Ren had become skeptical of the House, so Stimpy comforts him. The bedroom has no bed, only a container that spits out a pill named "Insta-Bed" that needs one drop of water to activate. It activates into a comfortable bed, to the duo's surprise; this is ruined after Stimpy's drooling led to the bed expanding to unimaginable proportions, as too much water is present. This convinces Ren to leave, only for Stimpy to denote a time machine whom he described as a convoluted plot device. Instead of leaving normally, they exploit the time machine, resulting in them being transported back to the time when Ren is using the television and is experiencing being dipped in scalding hot water, ending the episode.

== Cast ==
- Billy West as Ren, Stimpy, and Salesman (That Guy)
- Harris Peet as Killer Kowalski

== Production ==
The episode is a parody of the 1949 MGM animated short from Tex Avery entitled The House of Tomorrow. The episode was written by eventual Futurama director Peter Avanzino and fellow Seinfeld writer Ron Hauge. Avanzino also produced the storyboards for the episode along with Stephen DeStefano. The scene where the whale vomits over Ren during the kitchen segment was censored on the home media release.

== Reception ==
The American critic Thad Komorowski gave the episode three and a half stars out five.

== Books and articles ==
- Dobbs, G. Michael (2015). Escape – How Animation Broke into the Mainstream in the 1990s. Orlando: BearManor Media. ISBN 978-1593931100.
- Komorowski, Thad (2017). Sick Little Monkeys: The Unauthorized Ren & Stimpy Story. Albany, Georgia: BearManor Media. ISBN 978-1629331836.
