= A Cartoon =

- The Ren & Stimpy Show episode
- Episode no.: Season 1 Episode 5b
- Directed by: John Kricfalusi
- Story by: Jim Smith; John Kricfalusi; Bob Camp (uncredited)
- Production code: RS-05B
- Original air date: November 10, 1991

Episode chronology
← Previous "Marooned"	Next → "Black Hole"

"A Cartoon", commonly misnamed and often officially called "Untamed World", is the tenth episode of the first season of The Ren & Stimpy Show. It originally aired on Nickelodeon in the United States on November 10, 1991. It is the first episode of the sub-series Untamed World, which would be followed by "Lair of the Lummox", as well as the only episode in it to be produced by Spümcø.

== Plot ==
This episode is one in a fictional television series, Untamed World, a parody of nature documentary series. Ren and Stimpy star as respectively Marland Höek and his bumbling assistant. The duo travel to the Galápagos Islands to study the local fauna, as Charles Darwin once did thousands of years ago.

The duo finds various strange creatures resembling them; some birds resemble Ren while some reptiles resemble Stimpy. They do not acquire the duo's character traits. Among them is a sea turtle, whose eggs produced a large amount of offspring. One is seemingly targeted by a seagull, which worries Stimpy; Ren instructs him not to interfere with nature. Surprisingly, the seagull was merely doing so to intimidate the turtle into lending money, who angrily obliges despite just being born.

The duo walk into a cave, where they find numerous albino cave salamanders resembling Ren; these salamanders have a literal radar in their heads, allowing them to track food in spite of their blindness; its tongue functions like a hand, grabbing insects into its mouth. Ren is disgusted by their appearance.

Ren notes the importance of camouflage, only for the duo to foolishly hide in a moose's head to masquerade as one, which clearly does not work. They observe a crocodile resembling Stimpy, whose vocalizations are the same of Stimpy's "Happy Happy Joy Joy" quote. It nevertheless is revealed to be bipedal and boards a school bus, implying that their society are technologically advanced and civilized.

The duo find a rare bipedal yak who Stimpy is ecstatic to record and tag. He accidentally tranquilizes Ren, who slows down on his chase of the yak and allows it to escape. Stimpy, unaware of his mistake, tags Ren; Ren is unable to respond due to his paralysis.

In the episode's final moments, Ren introduces a frilled lizard resembling him, whose expanding of its anole-like gular fold attracts photographers (as if they are female anoles). Ren tags Stimpy's tongue as Stimpy did on his ear as retribution, ending the episode.

== Cast ==
- Ren – voice of John Kricfalusi
- Stimpy – voice of Billy West
- The Turtle – voice of Harris Peet
- The Seagull – voice of Billy West

== Production ==
The episode was conceived in October 1990 and spent much of 1991 in production. John Kricfalusi came up with the idea of a spoof of nature documentaries, and was deeply involved in the production, insisting on reviewing personally every drawing for the episode. Bob Camp was involved with writing the story, but he was not credited as the title card did not have enough space. He also clarified that the common title of "Untamed World" was actually the name of the subseries. Many of the drawings for "Untamed World" were done by Jim Smith. The actual task of drawing in and painting all of the frames one by one was assigned to Lacewood Productions in Ottawa. It was the last episode aired to be animated by Lacewood, as its dismal working conditions and subpar output made it back out from animating more episodes, despite Kricfalusi approving of their work.

== Reception ==
American critic Dawn Taylor rated "A Cartoon" as one of the best episodes of the first season, that featured "some truly disturbing Galapagos Island nature footage". Karen Schomer, a television critic of The New York Times, wrote in 1992 that it was a "strange episode" that featured "odd-looking animals [that] had no happy ending". Thad Komorowski rated the episode four and a half out of five stars, considering it to be a worthy tribute of Tex Avery's travelogue comedy animated short films and a humorous episode in its own right.

== Books and articles ==
- Dobbs, G. Michael (2015). Escape – How Animation Broke into the Mainstream in the 1990s. Orlando: BearManor Media. ISBN 978-1593931100.
- Komorowski, Thad (2017). Sick Little Monkeys: The Unauthorized Ren & Stimpy Story. Albany, Georgia: BearManor Media. ISBN 978-1629331836.
