= Stimpy's Invention =

- The Ren & Stimpy Show episode
- Title card of the episode depicting Ren Höek stuck inside a flask
- Episode no.: Season 1 Episode 12
- Directed by: John Kricfalusi
- Story by: John Kricfalusi; Bob Camp
- Production code: RS-06B
- Original air date: February 23, 1992

Episode chronology
← Previous "Black Hole"	Next → "In the Army"

"Stimpy's Invention" is the twelfth episode and season finale of the first season of The Ren & Stimpy Show. It originally aired on Nickelodeon in the United States on February 23, 1992. It was written by John Kricfalusi and Bob Camp, with Kricfalusi serving as director.

In the episode, Stimpy creates a series of absurd and impractical inventions, much to Ren's frustration. When one particularly infuriates Ren, Stimpy mistakenly sees his anger as unhappiness and begins to "fix it" by inventing the Happy Helmet, a psychological control device that forces happiness. During a manic performance of Happy Happy Joy Joy, Ren briefly regains self-control and uses a hammer to destroy the helmet, ultimately confronting Stimpy.

The episode had an overextended production and took a year to complete, due to frequent delays and revisions, high-quality animation, and clashes with Nickelodeon. Following its premiere, "Stimpy's Invention" received critical acclaim, with critics praising its animation and complex theme, especially the Happy Happy Joy Joy scene. It remains one of the most well-known and popular episodes of the series.

== Plot ==
An excerpt from "Stimpy's Invention", featuring the Happy Happy Joy Joy scene

Stimpy, showing more intelligence than usual, creates a series of impractical inventions and subjects Ren to each one. The Cheese-O-Phone serves no useful purpose, while the Remote Controlled Shaver malfunctions and shaves off Ren's fur. Ren initially enjoys the glue-filled Stay-Put Socks, but they prevent him from walking, causing him to become frustrated. Misinterpreting his feelings as unhappy, Stimpy vows to invent something that will make Ren happy.

In his laboratory, Stimpy uses machinery and animals for his invention, while rehydrating himself with sweat that accumulates in his glasses. Following multiple attempts, he successfully invents "Happy Helmet", a device that manipulates the wearer's emotions through brainwashing. He places it on Ren, who objects but soon falls under its influence and happily performs chores for Stimpy for the latter's enjoyment. Stimpy later brings home a record of his favorite song, "Happy Happy Joy Joy", performed by fictional folk singer Stinky Whizzleteats. As Stimpy and the brainwashed Ren dance to the music, Stimpy becomes distracted, allowing Ren to pull a hammer from the kitchen. He smashes his head while destroying the Happy Helmet. Freed from its control, an enraged Ren confronts Stimpy and begins strangling him, but stops after realizing he enjoys being angry, leaving the latter confused.

== Cast ==
- John Kricfalusi – Ren / Stinky Whizzleteats
- Billy West – Stimpy

== Production ==
"Stimpy's Invention" was directed and written by John Kricfalusi with co-writing and storyboarding from Bob Camp. Its animation was directed by Bob Jaques and done by Carbunkle Cartoons. Additional animators include Mark Kausler, Steve Markowski, and Julian Chaney, and its production code was RS-06B. The episode had an overextended production, taking a year to complete from the beginning of production in February 1991 until it aired a year later in February 1992.

The story originated in 1990 when Camp developed the idea of a story in which Ren is subject to Stimpy's impractical inventions. Kricfalusi was highly interested in Camp's idea. Camp later explained that Kricfalusi was deeply invested in the idea, obsessively refining each detail until it met his standards. Kricfalusi altered the story's direction after suggesting to Camp that Ren should experience a breakdown, prompting Stimpy to create the Happy Helmet, an invention intended to cure him, but controls him while struggling for freedom.

=== Writing ===
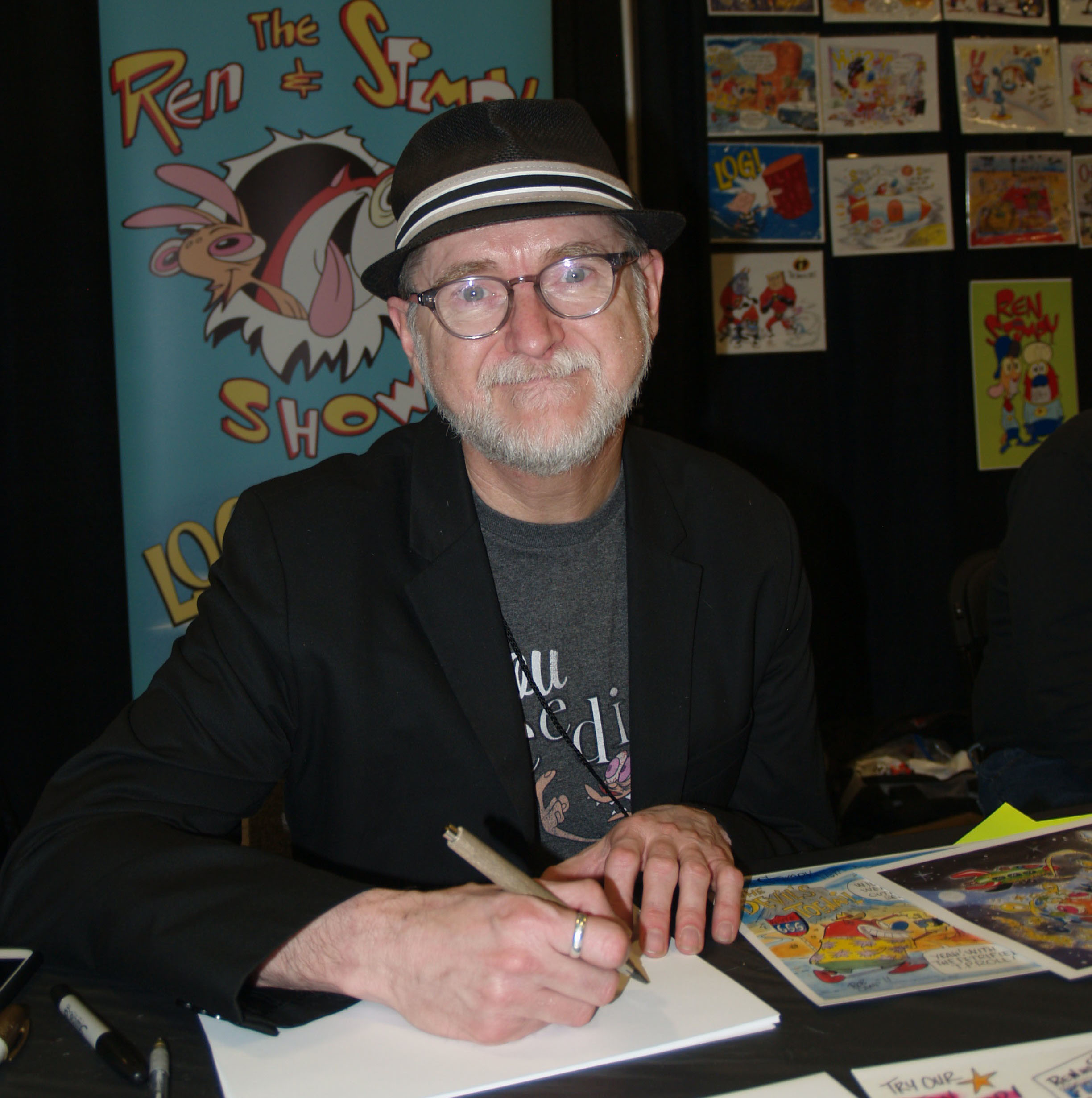
Bob Camp (pictured in 2015) conceptualized the story of "Stimpy's Invention", impressing Kricfalusi.

The executives wanted to include a scene where Stimpy uses a duck as a tool, Ren whacks Stimpy with a folded newspaper, and the latter grins so wildly "that the top of his head separated from his lower jaw". Some of the more extreme elements of the story were removed, although much of the material that the executives objected to made it on the final cut. In a 2008 interview, Kricfalusi revealed he had to strongly persuade producer Vanessa Coffey to approve production on "Stimpy's Invention", as the team lost a month because of issues beyond their control. He mentioned that both "Space Madness" and "Stimpy's Invention" were initially rejected by Nickelodeon before convincing them otherwise. Retrospectively, they are considered the show's most popular episodes.

Vincent Waller stated that the network executives of Nickelodeon disliked Stimpy's use of a duck to create the Happy Helmet due to concerns of children imitating the scene with using ducks as tools. They preferred Stimpy to use a woodpecker instead. According to Waller, there were concerns that the scene was too painful for the duck, suggesting that having its head interact with hard metal in such a way could cause harm. Kricfalusi sent out a memo that stated the animation team was going to draw a duck as he recalled: "I just sent them back a note saying, 'No.'"

In interviews, Kricfalusi stated that the episode faced significant delays due to prolonged approval processes. When the storyboard was originally reviewed, executives misunderstood it and initially wanted it scrapped. He said he had to plead with Coffey to move forward with it. Despite Coffey's approval of the story outline, Kricfalusi noted that Will McRobb was against the concept since its beginning, expressing concern over a cartoon about mind control for children—an objection Kricfalusi claimed not to understand. Coffey admitted to having disagreements with Kricfalusi over the story's content, but denied Kricfalusi's claim that she wanted to veto the episode. Several scenes were censored by the network executives, including a scene where Ren, under the control of the Happy Helmet, submissively licks Stimpy, which did not make it past the storyboard phase due to featuring homoerotic elements.

=== Storyboarding ===
The storyboard phase of the episode began in late 1990 and was finished by late February 1991. The animators who worked on the episode have stated that it was Kricfalusi's perfectionism and micro-management leadership style that delayed the production. The animators who worked on "Stimpy's Invention" have stated in various interviews that the network executives censored several scenes from the storyboard phase, but afterward were content to let production proceed after it started in February 1991.

"Stimpy's Invention" was scheduled to premiere in October 1991, but did not premiere until February 1992 due to its production delays. Camp described the production as extremely demanding, reflecting that the team exhausted themselves trying to refine it. Constant revisions prevented the episode from finishing by its deadline. According to Camp, the episode was a rare blend of his own drawings and Kricfalusi's dedication, with the latter pushing everyone relentlessly in pursuit of perfection.

=== Animation ===
Stimpy presenting a surprise for Ren with a box. This scene took a month to complete due to Kricfalusi's constant revisions about the color of the box, leading to 50 different variations of the box in various colors and shades.

Kricfalusi's insistence on redrawing many of the scenes himself greatly hindered production. One scene, where Stimpy presents his "Stay-Put Socks" to Ren, took an entire month to complete as Kricfalusi often revised the color of the box that held the socks, despite its brief appearance for a few seconds. The scene's painter, Teale Wang, painted fifty variants of the box in multiple colors and shades until Kricfalusi chose Wang's first painting of the box. Wang reported that she felt that Kricfalusi was even then not pleased with the coloring of the box. Likewise, another animator, David Koenigsberg, recalled that Kricfalusi would be angry at him over his coloring of the Happy Helmet and that meeting his standards was extremely difficult. Koenigsberg recalled an incident in which Kricfalusi stormed into the workplace, angrily reprimanded him in front of others, and left in a rage. According to Koenigsberg, the outburst appeared entirely serious, leaving him confused about the reason for Kricfalusi's anger until fellow artist Chris Reccardi remarked that such treatment was a common experience among the staff.

Animator Mark Kausler, who drew the Happy Happy Joy Joy scene and another featuring Ren smashing his head with a hammer, stated that Kricfalusi was "not an easy director to please" and that "he didn't always know what he was looking for". For the dance Ren and Stimpy perform to Happy Happy Joy Joy, in which they repeatedly rub their buttocks against each other, Kausler drew five different versions where Stimpy's buttocks grew progressively more inflated with each drawing. The most extreme version of Stimpy's bloated buttocks was rejected by Kricfalusi as too inappropriate for even his own sense of humor. Kricfalusi then changed his mind several weeks later and chose that version for broadcast.

=== Frequent delays ===
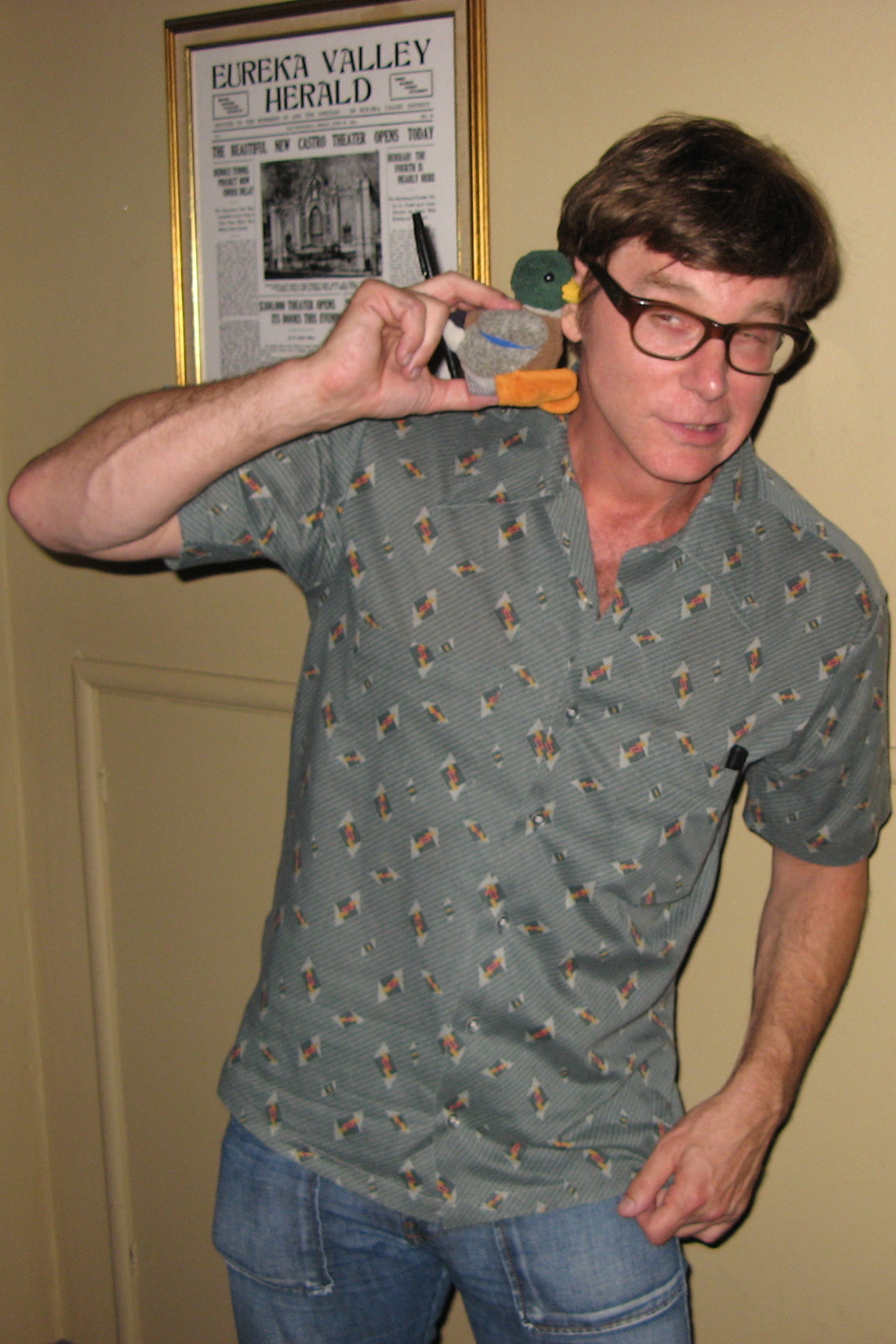
Most of the production of "Stimpy's Invention" was done at John Kricfalusi's studio, Spümcø, under his supervision. The episode took a year to complete due to Kricfalusi's perfectionism and constant revisions.

The production on "Stimpy's Invention" was far behind in August–September 1991 that Carbunkle Cartoons in Vancouver, which was hired as a subcontractor for the animation, were forced to temporarily fire much of their staff due to the lack of material arriving from California to justify paying for a full staff. The scene where Ren, after having the Happy Helmet placed on his head, attempts to resist the effect and goes through a series of contorted facial expressions, was especially onerous and difficult to draw. The task of illustrating the scene was assigned to Kelly Armstrong, the co-boss of Carbunkle and wife of Bob Jaques, who impressed the other animators with her ability to illustrate such a dramatic transformation. Armstrong recalled animating Ren in the scene as particularly complex, with the character staggering, transitioning between two poses, and delivering dialogue simultaneously. Due to its difficulty, the mouth movements were animated in one sequence but "pinned" onto the head using a radically staggered order—all while matching the exaggerated motion of Ren.

Much of production on "Stimpy's Invention" was done at Spümcø in Los Angeles under Kricfalusi's supervision. To the annoyance of others working on the episode, Kricfalusi would personally redraw much of the episode himself in October 1991, at a time when it should have been aired. Koenigsberg stated that Kricfalusi had gone "a little bit nuts" by the fall of 1991 as he started to redraw scenes that already had been sent to the Carbunkle studio, a practice that brought production to "a complete halt". Animator Christine Danzo revealed that Kricfalusi at one point took the entire draft of the episode, locked it in his office, and refused to "let it out until he had gone through the entire show and had it the way he wanted".

By November 1991, Howard Baker had resigned as the overseas supervisor, and Jaques was hired to go to the Philippines to oversee the inking of the episode by Fil-Cartoons at Manila. However, Jaques disliked overseeing production in various Asian studios, as their cartoonists were poorly paid and had a level of craftsmanship not up to American standards, which led to him refusing Kricfalusi's request to work as the overseas supervisor. Jaques saw the animation drafts of "Fire Dogs" being vandalized by the staff of the Fil-Cartoons studio. The version of "Fire Dogs" that premiered in 1991 was shorter than intended due to production problems, as much of the footage had been vandalized beyond repair. Jaques was fond of his work on this episode and did not want the episode to get damaged the same way as "Fire Dogs". When Jaques arrived in Manila in November 1991, he reported that much of the footage had been damaged due to incompetence, and had to redo much of the episode himself using the original pencil drawings. Jaques called Fil-Cartoons "the cheapest [expletive] studio I've ever had the displeasure to work with". Animation historian Thad Komorowski wrote that Fil-Cartoons was the animation equivalent of a sweatshop, as many of the Fil-Cartoons cartoonists slept outside of the studio and were unable to pay rent, and the studio had no toilet paper in its washrooms out of the fear that the employees might steal it; he compared its performance unfavorably to Lacewood Productions, another animation studio they hired with similarly abysmal working conditions and performance, though Kricfalusi didn't disapprove of its work.

Jaques reported that the Filipino cartoonists of Fil-Cartoons were inept and that many of the visual flaws in "Stimpy's Invention" were due to their poor workmanship. Jaques described an incident where he discovered that a camera move on an exposure sheet was altered from a three-frame move to an eleven-frame move. When he questioned the checker about the change, the response was that a three-frame camera move wasn't possible—an assumption Jaques attributed to poor training. He emphasized that these misconceptions affected the animation process, stating that skilled animators can control nearly any aspect of a frame when they understand the medium properly. Owing to the demands from the network to have the episode finally finished, Jaques had several scenes of "Stimpy's Invention" discarded and only chose to focus on having the staff of Fil-Cartoons ink in and paint the scenes that he deemed essential for the story. To save time, Jaques used the workprint rather than the negative for the scene where Ren cleans Stimpy's filthy underwear, which was the reason for the dirt lines that appeared in the final version. Throughout November and December 1991, the Fil-Cartoons staff painted and inked in "Stimpy's Invention".

Jaques reported that the cartoonists of Fil-Cartoons sabotaged much of the drawings of "Stimpy's Invention" out of anger as he showed them animation methods superior to their own. The scene where Stimpy has an epiphany and says, "I must use my gift of invention to save Ren!", had to be reshot in the United States as it was intentionally damaged in the Philippines. Jaques stated that Fil-Cartoons disregarded his instructions by altering the animation, despite being specifically told not to make any changes. The problems with Fil-Cartoons in the first season led to the work of inking in The Ren & Stimpy Show episodes being subcontracted out to the Rough Draft Korea studio in South Korea for the second season. The frequent delays on "Stimpy's Invention" led Nickelodeon to present it as a "lost episode" of The Ren & Stimpy Show when it aired on February 23, 1992.

== Reception ==
American scholar Thad Komorowski gave the episode five out of five stars, considering it to be among the best of the series with "an ideal balance of genuine turmoil with uproarious comedy". The American journalist Joey Anuff wrote that "Stimpy's Invention" was Kricfalusi's "finest moment". In a review for The Ren & Stimpy Show's first two seasons on DVD, critic Dawn Taylor called "Stimpy's Invention" one of the best episodes of the show that featured the "dastardly catchy Happy Happy Joy Joy song". She also observed that the psychotic rant delivered by the Burl Ives–like character Stinky Wizzleteats consists of dialogue originally spoken by Ives in the 1958 film The Big Country. American scholar Sarah Banet-Weiser wrote that "Stimpy's Invention", when it premiered in 1992, was a refreshing change from the banal and bland cartoons of the 1980s. Banet-Weiser wrote that much of the dialogue in "Stimpy's Invention", such as Ren's threat, "You filthy swine, I will kill you!" would not have been aired in a 1980s cartoon. Banet-Weiser noted that the episode cheerfully satirized many of the conventions of modern American culture, such as Stimpy's use of a duck and a beaver as tools which mocked the "no testing on animals" disclaimer often used in American marketing. Banet-Weiser noted that "Stimpy's Invention" lampooned the ideals of happiness and conformity in modern American culture as it is being unhappy that makes Ren happy and the Happy Helmet is a form of slavery as Ren no longer has control of his mind and his emotions after Stimpy places it on his head.

=== Themes and analysis ===
One of the main aspects of "Stimpy's Invention" is the Happy Helmet, a device Stimpy invented to psychologically control Ren, satirizing forced conformity of people with mental health issues in societal perspectives.

Much of the story of "Stimpy's Invention" is a parody of the idea popular in certain quarters that being perpetually happy should be the norm for everyone. Likewise, the story satirizes the belief that any form of sadness is a mental disorder that needs to be whisked away via a regime of drugs and therapy. Komorowski noted that the story of "Stimpy's Invention" is about freedom as Ren asserts his identity in the face of Stimpy's efforts to impose his version of happiness on him. There is nothing that indicates that Ren likes the song Happy Happy Joy Joy, but he is forced to dance to that song under the control of the Happy Helmet because it is Stimpy's favorite song. The notion that Ren might have another favorite song of his own did not seem relevant to Stimpy's way of thinking. The way that Stimpy casually assumed that because Happy Happy Joy Joy made him happy that it would also make Ren happy reflected his utter disregard for Ren's feelings that stood in an ironic contrast to his desire to ensure that Ren would always be happy.

Komorowski noted that Ren under the control of the Happy Helmet was being "tortured, physically and mentally" while Stimpy was completely "oblivious" to the pain that he had inflicted on him. Stimpy was quite surprised when he learned at the climax that Ren was angry at him. Komorowski argued that Stimpy displayed a parental love and concern for Ren as he only wanted him to be happy, but that he went about helping his friend in a manner that was brutal and callous, albeit only because Stimpy was so lost in his "brainless ecstasy" that he was incapable of understanding the torment that he inflicted.

Banet-Weiser noted that Ren, under the dominance of the Happy Helmet, has an unnaturally wide, crazed smile perpetually stuck on his face with bloodshot eyes while he attends happily to Stimpy's utterly repulsive desideratum of needs, such as cleaning Stimpy's filthy litterbox and his equally filthy underwear. Banet-Weiser also noted that the song Happy Happy Joy Joy is, despite its title, rather menacing as the singer threatens at one point: "I don't think you're happy enough. I'll teach you to be happy!" Banet-Weiser wrote: "The transgressing of boundaries of taste and convention in Ren & Stimpy is playful; 'Stimpy's Invention' consciously mocks the authenticity of 'being happy,' so that the unofficial anthem of Ren & Stimpy, Happy Happy Joy Joy, is provocatively ironic". The 2020 documentary, Happy Happy Joy Joy: The Ren and Stimpy Story, took its title from the song. In a review of Happy Happy Joy Joy, the British critic Andrew Pulver wrote: "Here is a documentary whose title contains radioactive levels of irony: happiness and joy are very far from what is to be found within."

== Works cited ==
- Anuff, Joel (November 1998). "The Nearly Invisible Animation Genius". Spin. 14 (11): 100–105.
- Klickstein, Matthew; Summers, Marc (2013). Slimed! An Oral History of Nickelodeon's Golden Age. London: Penguin Publishing Group. ISBN 9781101614099.
- Komorowski, Thad (2017). Sick Little Monkeys: The Unauthorized Ren & Stimpy Story. Albany, Georgia: BearManor Media. ISBN 978-1629331836.
- Langer, Mark (2004). "Ren & Stimpy: Fan Culture and Corporate Strategy". In Heather Hendershot (ed.). Nickelodeon Nation: The History, Politics, and Economics of America's Only TV Channel for Kids. Albany: NYU Press. pp. 155–181. ISBN 9780814736524.
- Banet-Weiser, Sarah (2007). Kids Rule! Nickelodeon and Consumer Citizenship. Durham: Duke University Press. ISBN 9780822339939.
