= Bob Jaques =

Canadian–American animator (born 1956)

- Born: Robert Paul Jaques; November 2, 1956 (age 69); Port Credit, Ontario, Canada
- Education: Sheridan College
- Occupations: Animator, storyboard artist, director
- Years active: 1970s–present
- Spouse: Kelly Armstrong (m. 1989)

Robert Paul Jaques (born November 2, 1956) is a Canadian–American animator and director. He is best known for the television series The Ren & Stimpy Show, The Baby Huey Show and SpongeBob SquarePants. He also was nominated for two Emmys in 1992 and 1993 for his contributions to The Ren & Stimpy Show.

== Early life and career ==
Jaques' fascination with animation began by watching the Fleischer Popeye cartoons as a kid, and he never thought of animating as a profession. He also did some stop motion animations since he was a fan of Ray Harryhausen films. One day, he got sick with mononucleosis and did nothing but watch cartoons. Jaques didn't "draw religiously" like other children his age but he was basically self-taught. He got curious in traditional animation when he was older and applied for an animation course in Sheridan College which didn't work the first time but when he drew with more effort it worked the second time. At Sheridan, he met with John Kricfalusi and Jaques showed 16mm prints during lunch hours of shorts from the Golden age of American animation, which a crowd of people would come in and John would be one of the regulars. Kricfalusi saw one of Jaques' animated shorts, which was based on a Robert Crumb comic called Tales from the Land of Genitalia, in which Jaques animated a penis with arms and legs jerking itself off, and Kricfalusi, when he saw the short, immediately thought he could animate. Eventually, Kricfalusi and Jaques became great friends because they both had an interest in golden age cartoons.

Jaques animation career started at Nelvana in the 1970s as an assistant animator for Jeff Short, an employee for the Richard Williams Studio. It didn't last long since Short got frustrated at the Nelvana animation process, so Jaques switched over the Nelvana commercial department with Mark Mayerson. He headed to Los Angeles in 1981, and his first job there was working for the show Laverne & Shirley in the Army. His first work with Kricfalusi was an animation director for the "Harlem Shuffle" music video, which was animated at Bagdasarian Productions and was part of a pitch piece presented by Ralph Bakshi and drawn by Kricfalusi. Ralph made a deal with The Rolling Stones to make the video for the single. In 1989, Kricfalusi called Jaques and recruited him to animate on the pilot short for Ren and Stimpy, based on two characters Kricfalusi originally pitched as pets within an Our Gang parody, Your Gang. Jaques and Kelly Armstrong worked on the pilot in Vancouver, and Jaques sent pencil tests to Spümcø for approval. Jaques and his animation company, Carbunkle Cartoons, went on to supply animation for the show in its first two seasons, animating notable episodes such as Stimpy's Invention, Son of Stimpy and Space Madness.

He hosted the Cartoon Logic podcast with Thad Komorowski. Jaques is currently the host of his own YouTube podcast called Classic Cartoon-ology.

== Filmography ==
=== Film ===
Year	Title	Role	Notes
1983	Rock & Rule	Assistant Animator	
1984	The Care Bears Battle the Freeze Machine	Assistant Animator	
1985	Strawberry Shortcake Meets the Berrykins	Animator	
1985	The Care Bears Movie	Animator	
1986	Care Bears Movie II: A New Generation	Animation Posing Artist	
1986	Star Wars: The Great Heep	Character Posing Artist	
1997	The Brave Little Toaster to the Rescue	Animation Director; Animator	Uncredited
1998	The Brave Little Toaster Goes to Mars	Animation Director; Animator	Uncredited
2009	The Haunted World of El Superbeasto	Animation Director	N/A

=== Television ===
Year	Title	Role	# of Eps
1985	Ewoks	character layout artist	13
1987	The Adventures of Teddy Ruxpin	key animator	60
1988	Dennis the Menace	senior key animator sheet director	13; 13
1990–1991	Teenage Mutant Ninja Turtles	storyboard artist	41
1991–1993	The Ren & Stimpy Show	animation director animator	18; 8
1993	2 Stupid Dogs	animation director	4
1994	The Baby Huey Show	developer writer producer director animation director	26; 9; 13; 4; 9
1996–1997	What a Cartoon!	animation director animator	1; 1
1997	Space Goofs	story	3
1998	I Am Weasel	animation director	1
1998	Cow and Chicken	animation director	1
1999	Boo Boo Runs Wild (short)	timing director	N/A
1999	The New Woody Woodpecker Show	supervising producer (seasons 1-2) supervising director (seasons 1-2) voice director (seasons 1-2) developer	26
2000	Family Guy	director	1
2001–2002	The Oblongs	director	2
2001	Time Squad	timing director	1
2001	Harvey Birdman, Attorney at Law	animation timer	1
2002–2005	My Life as a Teenage Robot	director	2
2003	Ren & Stimpy "Adult Party Cartoon"	animation director sheet timer	4; 1
2006–2008	Robotboy	animation timer lead timing director	15; 14
2007–2008	Wayside	director's notes	29
2008	The Marvelous Misadventures of Flapjack	sheet timer (Uncredited)	1
2015	Uncle Grandpa	animation director sheet timer	4; 1
2016–2018	SpongeBob SquarePants	animation director timing director	21; 1 (Note: Used in place of the usual animation director credit on the opening credits for the episode Plankton Retires.)
2020	The Tom and Jerry Show	storyboard artist	1
2020	Looney Tunes Cartoons	animator	2
2025	Bullet Time	animation director	1
TBA	Ren & Stimpy	animation director	10
