= Bob Camp =

American animator and comic book artist

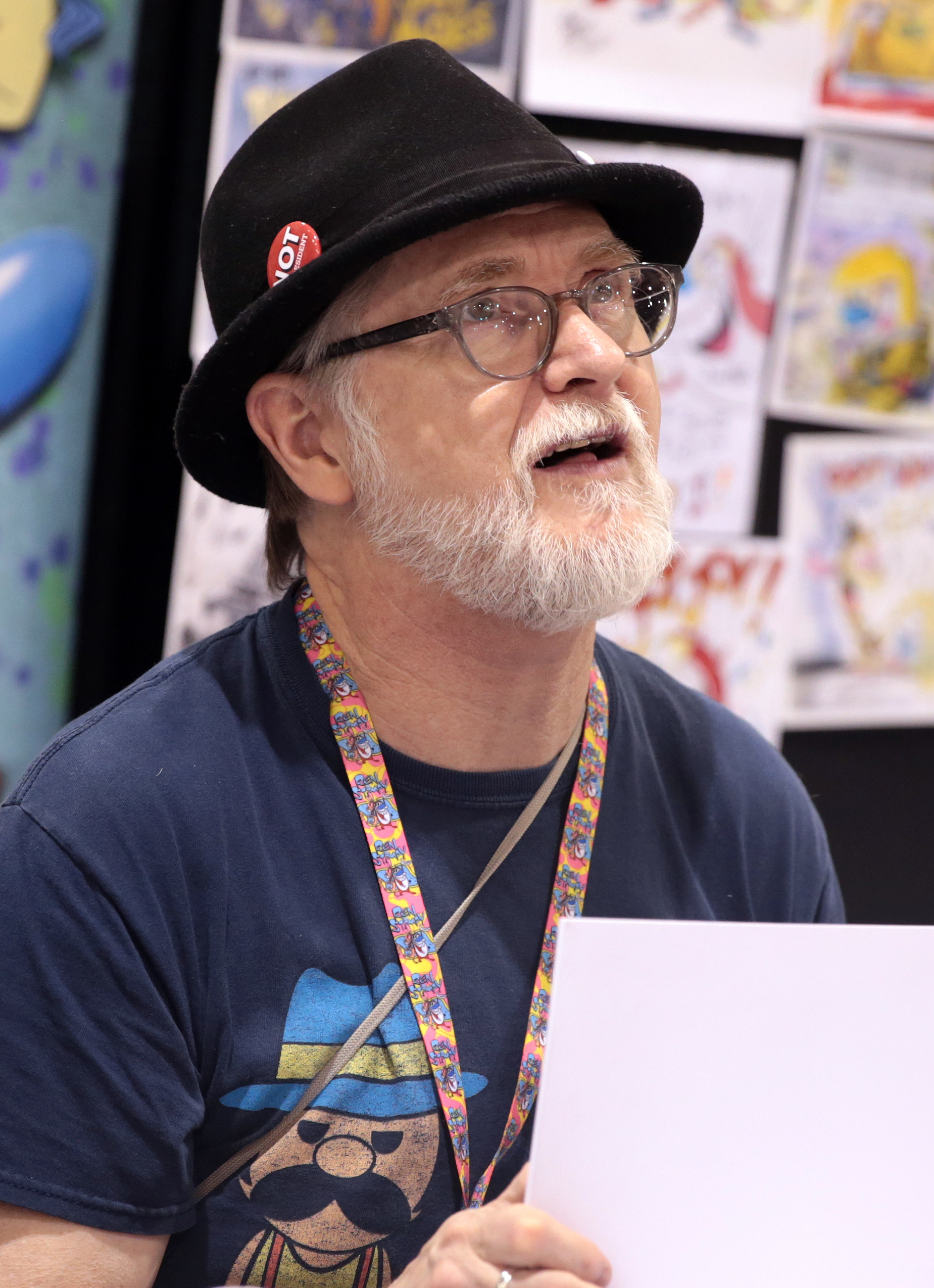
- Camp at the 2018 Phoenix Comic Fest
- Born: Robert Camp; February 7, 1956 (age 70) Gregg County, Texas U.S.
- Areas: Animator; Cartoonist; Comic book artist Storyboard artist Writer; Production artist Director; Producer

Robert Camp (born February 7, 1956) is an American animator, writer, cartoonist, comic book artist, storyboard artist, director, producer, and voice actor. He is best known for founding Spümcø and his work for developing and serving as a showrunner for The Ren & Stimpy Show. He has been nominated for two Emmys, a CableACE Award, and an Annie Award for his work on The Ren & Stimpy Show.

== Career ==
Camp started his animation career as a designer for animated series such as ThunderCats, Silverhawks, TigerSharks, and several other series produced by Rankin/Bass. He then worked as a designer on The Real Ghostbusters for DiC, and later as a storyboard artist on Tiny Toon Adventures for Warner Bros. Television.

Camp was a co-founder of and director for Spümcø, the animation studio that created The Ren & Stimpy Show. He played a major role in the studio's creative force (storyboarding the entirety of "Stimpy's Invention" himself) until September 21, 1992, when he left to work for Games Productions (a.k.a. Games Animation), the animation studio Nickelodeon initially created to continue work on The Ren and Stimpy Show after Spümcø and creator John Kricfalusi had been fired. At Games, Camp was promoted to creative director of The Ren and Stimpy Show and supervised the series' production until its conclusion. After Ren & Stimpy ended in 1995, Camp and former Ren & Stimpy writer Jim Gomez began developing a new series for Nickelodeon titled Kid Komet and Galaxy Gal, which was never picked up for a full series.

In the 1980s, Camp worked at Marvel Comics as an illustrator on many comic titles including G.I. Joe, Crazy Magazine, Bizarre Adventures, Savage Tales, Conan the Barbarian, and The 'Nam. During this time, he also drew the cover art of Jam on Revenge, the 1984 debut album by the Electro-hip hop group Newcleus.

In the 2000s, Camp worked as a storyboard artist on animated feature films such as Looney Tunes: Back in Action and Ice Age: The Meltdown, and also as writer and director on Robotboy.

Camp previously taught at the School of Visual Arts in New York City.

== Influences ==
He was intrigued by Charlie Chaplin, Buster Keaton, Stanley Kubrick, Peter Sellers, Laurel and Hardy and Monty Python, but also Bill Plympton, Terry Gilliam, Don Martin, Chuck Jones, Bob Clampett, Walt Disney and Tex Avery.

== Filmography ==
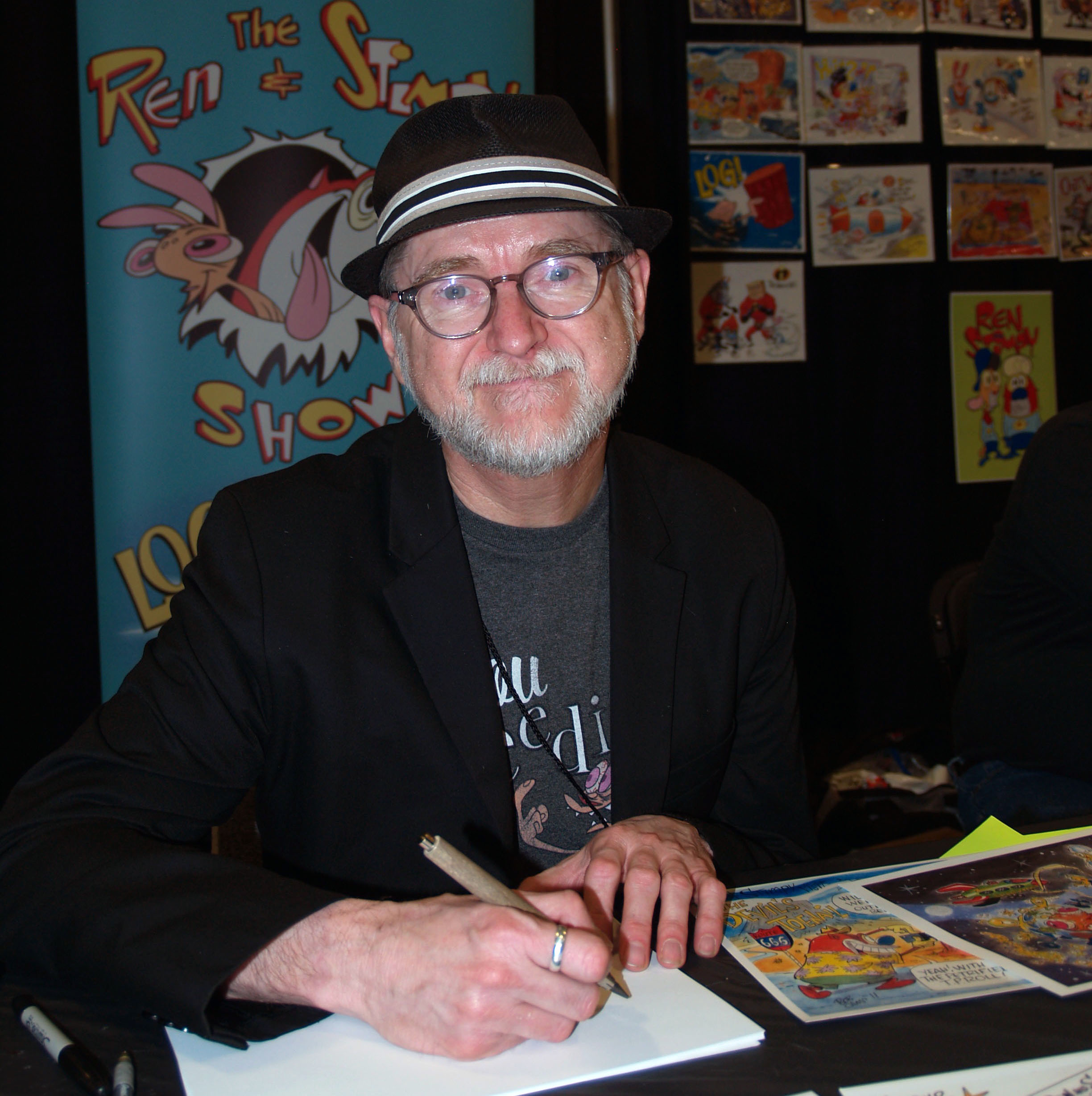
Camp at the 2015 East Coast Comicon in Secaucus, New Jersey

=== Television ===
Year	Title	Role
1985–1987	ThunderCats	Development artist, design lead
1985–1987	SilverHawks	Development artist, design lead
1985–1987	TigerSharks	Development artist, design lead
1985–1987	Mini Monsters	Development artist, design lead
1985–1987	Karate Kat	Development artist, design lead
1985–1987	Street Frogs	Development artist, design lead
1986	The Real Ghostbusters	Character designer
1987	Mighty Mouse: The New Adventures	Character designer
1988	The New Adventures of Beany and Cecil	Character designer
1990	Tiny Toon Adventures	Storyboard artist
1990	Attack of the Killer Tomatoes	Storyboard director
1991–1996	The Ren & Stimpy Show	Story editor, story, storyboard artist, writer, director, producer, supervising director, creative director, voice actor
1995	Kid Komet and Galaxy Gal	Failed pilot; writer, storyboard artist, director
1997–1998	Space Goofs	Story, storyboard artist, co-story supervisor, voice director
1997–1999	Cow and Chicken	Storyboard artist
1997–1999	I Am Weasel	Storyboard artist
1999	The Cartoon Cartoon Show	Dialogue director, writer, director, storyboard artist (The Lucky Lydia Show)
2001	Evil Con Carne	Storyboard artist
2001–2003	Jackie Chan Adventures	Storyboard artist
2002	Ozzy & Drix	Storyboard artist
2005–2008	Robotboy	Director, writer
2010	Sym-Bionic Titan	Storyboard artist
2010–2011	Kick Buttowski: Suburban Daredevil	Storyboard artist
2011	Bubble Guppies	Storyboard supervisor
2012	YooHoo & Friends	Storyboard artist
2015–present	SpongeBob SquarePants	Storyboard artist, character designer, supervising director
2016	Mighty Magiswords	Writer and storyboard artist
2021–2024	Kamp Koral: SpongeBob's Under Years	Storyboard supervisor
2023–present	The Patrick Star Show	Storyboard supervisor

=== Film ===
Year	Title	Role
2000	How the Grinch Stole Christmas	Storyboard artist
2001	Osmosis Jones	Storyboard artist
2001	Cats & Dogs	Storyboard artist
2002	Scooby-Doo	Storyboard artist
2003	Looney Tunes: Back in Action	Storyboard artist
2005	Robots	Storyboard artist
2006	Ice Age: The Meltdown	Storyboard artist
2013	Epic	Storyboard artist
2015	The SpongeBob Movie: Sponge Out of Water	Layout artist
2020	Happy Happy Joy Joy: The Ren and Stimpy Story	Himself
2021	Rumble	Storyboard artist

== Marvel Comics covers – selected bibliography ==
- The 'Nam (1986) Issues #14, #17, #20, #22
- Conan the Destroyer (1985) #1, #2
