= List of The Ren & Stimpy Show episodes =

The Ren & Stimpy Show is an American animated series that premiered on Nickelodeon on August 11, 1991, directly following the premieres of Doug and Rugrats, and it ran for five seasons until December 16, 1995, with the ninth and final episode of its Nick run, "A Scooter for Yaksmas". The series initially did not have a consistent grouping of segments into episodes, episodes and interstitial segments aired out of production order, some episodes and interstitials were produced for one season and aired in another, and two episodes, "Man's Best Friend" and "Sammy and Me / The Last Temptation", did not air in the series' original Nickelodeon run at all due to different reasons. "Man's Best Friend" aired on the Ren & Stimpy "Adult Party Cartoon" for Spike TV in 2003 alongside the uncut show's pilot, "Big House Blues". "Son of Stimpy" premiered on MTV on January 13, 1993, while "Sammy and Me / The Last Temptation", the series' finale, aired on October 20, 1996, on the same network.

The first list is ordered according to the original television air date, and a second list provides the episode order according to the DVD releases, which groups the cartoons into 52 episodes.

== Series overview ==
Season	Segments	Episodes	Originally released	
Season	Segments	Episodes	First released	Last released
Theatrical pilot			August 10, 1990	
1	13	6	August 11, 1991	February 23, 1992
2	18	12	August 15, 1992	May 23, 1993
3	16	10	November 20, 1993	July 30, 1994
4	27	14	October 1, 1994	April 1, 1995
5	17	10	June 3, 1995	October 20, 1996

The episodes were interspersed with short segments that sometimes aired before or after the main cartoons, which are named below.

== Episodes ==
=== Theatrical pilot (1990) ===
Title	Produced and directed by	Story by	Original release date	Prod. code
"Big House Blues"	John Kricfalusi	John K., Bob Camp, & Jim Smith	August 10, 1990	R&S-001
Ren and Stimpy get caught by the dogcatcher and are sent to the pound, where they meet Jasper and briefly Phil until he has to take "The Big Sleep". Ren initially does not understand, but after Jasper explains this to Ren, their lives seem to be on a thin thread until a sweet girl adopts them both.

=== Season 1 (1991–92) ===
The season's episodes were interspersed with short segments: three "Ask Dr. Stupid" segments, three different "Log" commercials, "My Little Brother Doll", a "Powdered Toast Man" commercial, "Secret Oath", "Stimpy's Breakfast Tips", four different "What'll We Do 'Till Then?" segments, and "Yak Shaving Day".

All episodes in this season were directed by series creator John Kricfalusi, credited as "John K." in most of the episodes in this season. He is credited by his regular name in "Space Madness" and "Big House Blues", while he was credited as Raymond Spum in "Nurse Stimpy". In addition, the title cards for the episodes "The Littlest Giant" and "Black Hole" would have the director uncredited.

No. overall (Note: The "No. overall" column numbers the overall episode segments by air date, and the "No. in season" column numbers them by their order on the DVD set.)	No. in season	Title	Story by	Storyboard by	Original release date	Prod. code
1	101A	"Stimpy's Big Day!"	John K. & Vincent Waller	Jim Smith, John K., & Vincent Waller	August 11, 1991	RS-01A
After winning a Gritty Kitty poem contest, Stimpy goes to Hollywood, leaving Ren feeling left out.
2	101B	"The Big Shot!"	John K. & Vincent Waller	Jim Smith, John K. & Vincent Waller	August 11, 1991	RS-01B
Stimpy enjoys living his new life in Hollywood, and becomes a big star, but after a while, they both start to miss each other and eventually Stimpy gives up all of the money and fame to see Ren again.
3	102A	"Robin Höek"	John K. & Bob Camp	Jim Smith & Vincent Waller (uncredited)	August 25, 1991	RS-02A
As Stimpy reads a mixed-up version of Robin Hood, Ren dreams he is Robin and Stimpy as all of the other roles.
4	102B	"Nurse Stimpy"	John K. & Bob Camp	Chris Reccardi	August 25, 1991	RS-02B
When Ren gets sick, Stimpy decides to take care of Ren himself, but the treatment proves worse than the disease. By the end, Ren feels better and Stimpy gets sick, prompting a vengeful "Nurse Ren" into action.
5	103A	"Space Madness"	John Kricfalusi & Jim Gomez	Jim Smith & Chris Reccardi	September 8, 1991	RS-03A
Commander Höek (Ren) and Cadet Stimpy are on a mission to explore the cosmos. Commander Höek begins to display symptoms of "space madness". Stimpy attempts to calm his sickened Commander while still maintaining his loyalty to his command, but it does not last long. Close to the end of the episode, Höek asks Stimpy to guard the History Eraser button and never to touch it – otherwise, it will remove him from existence – and, thanks to the narrator, Stimpy eventually does just that.
6	103B	"The Boy Who Cried Rat!"	Vincent Waller & John K.	Vincent Waller	September 8, 1991	RS-03B
When Ren and Stimpy are caught stealing out of garbage cans, they are chased out on the streets, and begin to starve. The pair then hatches a plan to get money and food: disguise Ren as a mouse and put him in the Pipes' home, and turn Stimpy into a neighborhood mouse catcher.
7	104B	"The Littlest Giant"	John K. & Bob Camp	Bob Camp & Vincent Waller	September 15, 1991	RS-04A
In another one of Stimpy's bedtime stories, Ren dreams he is Wee Ren, who befriends the littlest giant (Stimpy) in the story, "The Littlest Giant".
8	204B	"Big House Blues"	John Kricfalusi, Bob Camp, & Jim Smith	Jim Smith & Lynne Naylor	September 15, 1991	R&S-001
A televised version of the theatrical pilot.
9	104A	"Fire Dogs"	John K.	Jim Smith & Chris Reccardi	September 29, 1991	RS-04B
Disguised as dalmatians to get food, shelter and money, Ren and Stimpy get jobs as fire dogs. Although they do not closely resemble dalmatians, a can of spotted "dalmatian paint" allows them to pass as the spotted animals. The job proves harder than Ren thought when the duo have to save Mrs. Buttloaves and her pets from a burning building.
10	105A	"Marooned"	John K.	Chris Reccardi	October 6, 1991	RS-05A
After Commander Höek (Ren) and Cadet Stimpy land on a strange planet, some peculiar (and painful) things happen to them.
11	105B	"A Cartoon" "Untamed World"	Jim Smith & John K.	Jim Smith	November 10, 1991	RS-05B
Ren and Stimpy host a nature show, Untamed World, and go to the Galápagos Islands to find weird creatures that look like themselves, which adds to the strangeness.
12	106A	"Black Hole"	Bob Camp & Will McRobb	Bob Camp	February 23, 1992	RS-06A
Commander Höek (Ren) and Cadet Stimpy pass through a black hole to find a mountain of missing left socks.
13	106B	"Stimpy's Invention"	John K. & Bob Camp	Bob Camp (uncredited)	February 23, 1992	RS-06B
After Ren tries some of Stimpy's inventions that work poorly, Stimpy invents a "Happy Helmet" to make Ren feel happier, at which Ren is forcefully happy.

=== Season 2 (1992–93) ===
This season's episodes were interspersed with the short segments "Ace Reporter, Ren Hoek: Mr Horse Returns", "Gritty Kitty Litter", two "Log" segments, "Powdered Toast Man: Vitamin F", "Secret Club: Susan Fout", "Sugar Sod Pops", a new "What'll We Do 'Till Then? Blow Yourself Up" segment, "World Crisis with Mr. Horse", and the short segments from the previous season.

No. overall	No. in season	Title	Directed by	Written by	Storyboard by	Original release date	Prod. code	Viewers (millions)
14	204A	"In the Army"	Bob Camp	Bob Camp	Jim Smith, Bob Camp, & Vincent Waller	August 15, 1992	RS5-2B	N/A
Ren and Stimpy register in the army, unaware of all of the obstacles to overcome with a big, bossy sarge, though they end up passing and entering a war.
15	206B	"Powdered Toast Man"	John K.	Story by : Richard Pursel & John K.	Jim Smith & Bill Wray	August 15, 1992	RS5-1B	N/A
Powdered Toast Man saves a kitten from crashing into a truck, rescues the Pope from Muddy Mudskipper, serves Ren and Stimpy breakfast, and helps the president with an embarrassing bathroom situation. Guest stars: Gary Owens as Powdered Toast Man and Frank Zappa as the Pope
16	201A	"Ren's Toothache"	John K.	Story by : Bob Camp & John K.	Chris Reccardi	August 22, 1992	RS5-2A	N/A
After Ren does not brush his teeth and all of his teeth fall out, Stimpy tells Ren to leave his nerve endings under his pillow, and a fairy will give him $100. During the night, the nerve ending fairy comes, but is all out of $100 bills, and gives him a ball of lint. Fortunately, the next day, Stimpy gives Ren one of his oversized teeth for a birthday present.
17	207B	"Out West"	Bob Camp	Bob Camp & John K.	Bob Camp	August 29, 1992	RS5-4B	N/A
Abner and Ewalt need someone to hang, so they hire Ren and Stimpy to steal Mr. Horse.
18	201B	"Rubber Nipple Salesmen"	Vincent Waller & John K.	Vincent Waller & John K.	Vincent Waller	August 29, 1992	RS5-4A	N/A
Ren and Stimpy try to sell rubber nipples to the Fire Chief, Mr. Horse and the Pipes.
19	202	"Svën Höek"	John K.	Bob Camp & John K.	Jim Smith & Bill Wray	November 7, 1992	RS5-3A	N/A
When Ren hears that his cousin Svën is coming over, he remembers him being smart, but when Svën arrives, he acts more like Stimpy, which puts Ren at his highest anger level after they accidentally destroy his prized possessions.
20	203A	"Haunted House"	Ron Hughart	John K., Bob Camp, Jim Smith, & Richard Pursel	Jim Smith, Richard Pursel & Bob Camp	November 21, 1992	RS5-6A	N/A
A dull ghost tries to scare Ren and Stimpy when they enter a haunted house, but the ghost's plans to scare Ren and Stimpy seem to fail.
21	203B	"Mad Dog Höek"	Bob Camp	Story by : Bob Camp; Teleplay by : Will McRobb	Bob Camp	November 21, 1992	RS5-6B	N/A
Ren, as Mad Dog Höek, and Stimpy, as Killer Cadogen, wrestle the Lout Brothers, Lump and Loaf, thinking that they're just pretending to wrestle.
22	205A	"Big Baby Scam"	Vincent Waller	Vincent Waller	Vincent Waller	December 12, 1992	RS5-9B	N/A
Ren and Stimpy trade places with two babies to get the easy life, but they encounter many shenanigans.
23	205B	"Dog Show"	Chris Reccardi & John K.	Richard Pursel	Chris Reccardi	December 12, 1992	RS5-3B	N/A
George Liquor has finished training and tries to make his dogs, Ren and Stimpy, win the all-breed dog show.
24	212	"Son of Stimpy"	John K.	John K., Vincent Waller, & Richard Pursel	Peter Avanzino	January 13, 1993	RS5-8	N/A
When Stimpy farts, he believes that he has given birth. He tells Ren about the incident, but Ren will not believe him. Soon, Stimpy relentlessly tries to find his fart, which he names "Stinky". Notes: The episode was originally titled "Stimpy's First Fart".; This episode was nominated for the Primetime Emmy Award for Outstanding Animated Program (for Programming Less Than One Hour) in 1993, but lost to the Batman: The Animated Series episode "Robin's Reckoning".
25	206A	"Monkey See, Monkey Don't!"	Bob Camp	Story by : Bob Camp & Vincent Waller	Bob Camp	February 13, 1993	RS5-13A	N/A
Ren and Stimpy, seeing how the animals at the zoo get free handouts from visitors, disguise themselves as primates and apply for positions in the monkey house. As the other monkey, "Filthy", gets good food, Stimpy ends up getting old nutshells and pre-chewed gum, while Ren only gets a rock. Then they decide to get a transfer as a bird and a hippo. Notes: This episode is the first to feature Billy West, the voice of Stimpy, taking over the role of Ren, following John Kricfalusi's firing from Nickelodeon.; It is also the first episode to be produced by Games Animation.; The episode was broadcast out of production order, as the remaining episodes of the season were produced by Kricfalusi and Spümcø prior to the former's termination from the show.
26	207A	"Fake Dad"	John K. & Jim Smith	John K. & Bob Camp	Jim Smith	February 27, 1993	RS5-5A	2.21 (HH) (Note: (HH) denotes that the numbers listed are the amount of households the episode was viewed in.)
Ren and Stimpy adopt an overgrown, seven-year-old convict named Kowalski. Stimpy is kind and understanding towards the barbaric "youngster", but Ren has a bit more trouble adjusting to parenthood.
27	209A	"The Great Outdoors"	Vincent Waller & Ken Bruce	Story by : Vincent Waller & John K.	Peter Avanzino	March 27, 1993	RS5-13B	1.82 (HH)
Ren and Stimpy go camping, but Ren begins to hate it when he suffers a streak of bad luck.
28	209B	"The Cat That Laid the Golden Hairball"	Ron Hughart	Story by : Vincent Waller & Bob Camp	Vincent Waller	April 3, 1993	RS5-9A	1.74 (HH)
Ren finds out that the value of hairballs is higher than gold and forces Stimpy to produce hairballs on a production line, but eventually, he has trouble producing anymore. Ren and Bubba try to help him, such as licking Ren's fur and Bubba's hairy back, but nothing works, and a brief trip into Stimpy's body reveals that his hairball gland turned into dust. When the worker working for them tells them that their business is over, they realize that the episode is over, and they all start dancing in celebration.
29	208	"Stimpy's Fan Club"	Peter Avanzino	Story by : Elinor Blake & John K. Teleplay by : Will McRobb	Peter Avanzino	April 24, 1993	RS5-11B	1.64 (HH)
When Stimpy becomes the adoration of many fans, Ren becomes jealous. To cheer him up, Stimpy makes him president of the Stimpy fan-club, leading to Ren getting even more jealous and thinking about killing Stimpy. Then Ren is sent a fan letter, of which he gloats about to Stimpy, but then becomes quickly disappointed and tearfully remorseful when he learns that the letter was from Stimpy himself.
30	210	"A Visit to Anthony"	John K. & Jim Smith	Story by : Richard Pursel & John K.	Jim Smith	May 8, 1993	RS5-10	1.70 (HH)
Anthony, a young fan of Ren and Stimpy, invites them to come to his house. They do, but they are confronted by Anthony's dad, apparently a cartoon hater, and the neighborhood bully Victor, but the father starts to like Ren and Stimpy as Stimpy wharfs hairballs onto Ren. Note: Anthony is voiced by Anthony Raspanti, a young fan who sent in one of the first letters to the show. Guest star: Anthony Raspanti as Anthony
31	211	"The Royal Canadian Kilted Yaksmen"	John K. & Chris Reccardi	Story by : John K., Bob Camp, Jim Gomez, & Vincent Waller	Chris Reccardi	May 23, 1993	RS5-7A	N/A
Ren and Stimpy join the elite force of Royal Canadian Kilted Yaksmen, whose famous motto is: "We always get our... butts kicked!", the duo search around the country to make settings in what is now Canada.

==== "Man's Best Friend" (1992) ====
Produced during the show's second season in 1992, the episode never aired on Nickelodeon. John Kricfalusi cites the violent imagery—Ren beating up George Liquor with an oar—as the primary reason for getting his production company and himself fired from the show. The episode originally aired on the Spike network as part of the 2003 revival series Ren & Stimpy "Adult Party Cartoon". "Man's Best Friend" is included in the first and second season DVD set.

Title	Directed by	Story by	Storyboard by	Original release date	Prod. code
"Man's Best Friend"	John K.	Vincent Waller & John K.	Chris Reccardi	June 23, 2003	RS5-1A
Ren and Stimpy learn the true meaning of obedience when George Liquor takes them home with him and swears to make them "champions", which does not happen.

=== Season 3 (1993–94) ===
This season's episodes were interspersed with the short segments "Cheesefist", "Chicken in a Drawer", "Dog Water", "Flod", "You Are What You Eat", and short segments from previous seasons.

No. overall ^{[a]}	No. in season ^{[a]}	Title	Directed by	Written by	Storyboard by	Original release date	Prod. code	Viewers (millions)
32	301A	"To Salve and Salve Not!"	Bob Camp	Bob Camp & Vincent Waller	Jim Gomez	November 20, 1993	RS-301	N/A
"There's That Man Again!" tries to sell Stimpy a new can of salve, but Ren will do anything to keep his friend from wasting his money.
33	302A	"A Yard Too Far"	Bob Camp	Story by : Bob Camp	Bob Camp & Joe Sibilski	November 20, 1993	RS-305	N/A
To get a delicious plate of Mr. and Mrs. Pipe's "hog jowls", Ren and Stimpy must make it past an angry baboon. Note: Purposefully based on the Yogi Bear cartoon "Pie Pirates".
34	302B	"Circus Midgets"	Bob Camp & Jim Gomez	Story by : Peter Avanzino, Ron Hauge, & Bob Camp	Stephen DeStefano	November 26, 1993	RS-306	N/A
Ren and Stimpy learn why you should never hitchhike: you may run into psychotic circus midgets.
35	301B	"No Pants Today"	Bill Wray & Bob Camp	Richard Pursel	Bill Wray	November 26, 1993	RS-302	N/A
When Stimpy is sent outside without any pants, he encounters Mr. and Mrs. Pipe, Victor the Bully and a pack of clothed wild animals.
36	303A	"Ren's Pecs"	Ron Hughart	Story by : Richard Pursel	Peter Avanzino	December 18, 1993	RS-304	N/A
After Ren gets picked on by a fat guy with pecs, his dream of pectoral muscles comes true when Stimpy surgically gives his butt fat to Ren's chest after Charles Globe mentions how he got his pecs.
37	303B	"An Abe Divided"	Jim Gomez	Jim Gomez & Ron Hauge	Stephen DeStefano	December 18, 1993	RS-310	N/A
Ren and Stimpy are assigned to guard the Lincoln Memorial, then Ren breaks open the statue's head after hearing about a rumored treasure inside, only to find caramel corn (like Stimpy said). Now they must repair the head before Sergeant Big Butt finds out.
38	304	"Stimpy's Cartoon Show"	Bob Camp	Story by : Elinor Blake (uncredited) & John K.	Michael Kim & Chris Reccardi	January 8, 1994	RS-303	N/A
Inspired by his idol, Wilbur Cobb, Stimpy starts to begin making his own cartoon. Talentless Ren then becomes the obnoxious producer of Stimpy's hardworking cartoon, and takes it too far. Guest star: Jack Carter as Wilbur Cobb
39	305A	"Jimminy Lummox"	Ron Hughart	Story by : Bob Camp, Jim Gomez, & Ron Hauge	Peter Avanzino	February 19, 1994	RS-309	N/A
After Ren does cruel things to the habitat (prank calls, infecting the tap water, yelling at baby birds, trying to prank Stimpy, and almost killing a fly by trying to rip one of its wings off), Stimpy then lends his conscience to Ren to set him right, but it seems to upset him more. Guest star: Stan Freberg as Jimminy Lummox
40	305B	"Bass Masters"	Bob Camp	Bob Camp & Jim Gomez	Peter Avanzino	February 19, 1994	RS-320	N/A
Ren hosts a television series where he teaches viewers to catch fish while on the hunt for "the foul-mouthed bass", but Stimpy and escaped convict Wilbur Cobb are catching all of the fish, while Ren himself does not get a single bite.
41	307B	"Road Apples"	Howard E. Baker	Ron Hauge	Howard E. Baker & Stephen DeStefano; Garret Ho (additional)	March 12, 1994	RS-319	N/A
While stuck in the desert, the duo finally come aboard Mr. and Mrs. Pipe's RV, with a butcher shop, skunk milk, and their fourth encounter with Wilbur Cobb.
42	306	"Ren's Retirement"	Bob Camp	Jim Gomez, Ron Hauge, & Bill Wray	Bill Wray & Bob Camp	April 2, 1994	RS-311	N/A
Strong, energetic, Ren's tenth birthday comes around. However, when Stimpy reminds him he's 70 in dog years, Ren becomes a crazy old coot. Haggis MacHaggis makes his first appearance in a cameo role. Note: This episode was nominated for the Primetime Emmy Award for Outstanding Animated Program (for Programming Less Than One Hour) in 1994, but lost to the special The Roman City.
43	307A	"Jerry the Bellybutton Elf"	Ron Hughart	Steve Mellor	Stephen DeStefano	April 9, 1994	RS-321	N/A
When Stimpy ventures into the inside of his bellybutton, he meets Jerry, the Bellybutton Elf at which he dislikes "Lint Loaf". Meanwhile, Ren (not too upset that Stimpy is stuck in his bellybutton, since he's still alive) throws a party, inviting every notable side character in the series at this point. Guest star: Gilbert Gottfried as Jerry the Bellybutton Elf and Adonis
44	308	"Hard Times for Haggis"	Chris Reccardi	Story by : Jim Gomez & Chris Reccardi	Chris Reccardi	April 30, 1994	RS-308	1.97 (HH)
TV star Haggis MacHaggis is kicked out of his mansion and thrown out onto the streets after Ren and Stimpy's cartoon show becomes more popular than his. Just as he plans to end it all, Haggis enlists in the help of two thugs-for-hire who help him sabotage Ren and Stimpy's show. Note: The episode's title is also written as "The Scotsman". Guest star: Alan Young as Haggis MacHaggis
45	309A	"Eat My Cookies"	Ron Hughart	Story by : Richard Pursel; Written by : Ron Hauge	Victoria Jenson	June 4, 1994	RS-317	N/A
Ren and Stimpy become Barrette Beret Girl Scouts, and when Ren makes Stimpy eat all of the cookies, they need to find a replacement for them. Also, when Stimpy earns the famed Snipe-Hunting Badge, Ren becomes desperate for one of his own. Guest star: Rosie O'Donnell as the Head Girl Scout
46	309B	"Ren's Bitter Half"	Michael Kim	Michael Kim, Ron Hauge, & Bob Camp	Peter Avanzino	June 4, 1994	RS-313	N/A
Stimpy's new genetic formula (Xb49) physically splits Ren into his two halves of his personality: "Evil Ren" and (surprisingly) "Indifferent Ren".
47	310	"Lair of the Lummox"	Bob Camp	Bob Camp & John K.	Jim Smith	July 30, 1994	RS-327	N/A
Ren and Stimpy, once again nature show hosts, examine a certain species: the lummox.

=== Season 4 (1994–95) ===
This season's episodes were interspersed with four short segments, only one of which, titled "Field Guide", premiered as part of the fourth season. 24 episodes were produced in this season, 10 of which were forcibly moved to a Nickelodeon-"commissioned" fifth season.

No. overall	No. in season ^{[a]}	Title	Directed by	Written by	Storyboard by	Original release date	Prod. code
48	401	"Hermit Ren"	Chris Reccardi	Story by : Jim Gomez, Bob Camp, Chris Reccardi, & Bill Wray	Chris Reccardi	October 1, 1994	RS-314
Fed up with Stimpy's stupidity and the entire world in general, Ren moves away and becomes a hermit, but starts to go mad from loneliness. Meanwhile, a lonely Stimpy makes a replica of Ren from his earwax.
49	402A	"House of Next Tuesday"	Ron Hughart	Ron Hauge & Peter Avanzino	Peter Avanzino & Stephen DeStefano	October 8, 1994	RS-312
Ren and Stimpy move into the "House of Next Tuesday".
50	402B	"A Friend in Your Face!"	Bob Camp	Bob Camp	Stephen DeStefano	October 8, 1994	RS-324
Stimpy has a friend in his face (like a tick), then Ren ends up with the friend's friend, which starts to annoy him endlessly.
51	403A	"Blazing Entrails"	Bob Camp	Bob Camp, Jim Gomez & Bill Wray	Stephen DeStefano & Bob Camp	October 15, 1994	RS-307
Ren takes Stimpy to Dr. Brainchild when he starts acting dumber than usual, but when Dr. Brainchild transforms Stimpy's body five times larger than his normal size, Ren has to go inside Stimpy to save him from an organ bully that is beating up his brain (but not before getting beaten up himself). Guest stars: Bill Mumy as Dr. Brainchild and June Lockhart as Dr. Brainchild's mother
52	403B	"Lumber Jerks"	Bob Camp & Bill Wray	Jim Gomez, Ron Hauge, Bob Camp, & Bill Wray	Bill Wray & Bob Camp	October 15, 1994	RS-316
While working on newspaper duty, Ren and Stimpy learn about how lumberjacks make more money and benefits. As a result, the duo become lumberjacks.
53	404A	"Prehistoric Stimpy"	Bob Camp	Bob Camp & Ron Hauge	Peter Avanzino & Stephen DeStefano	November 5, 1994	RS-322
We get a peek at Ren and Stimpy as dinosaurs and a fifth appearance of Wilbur Cobb.
54	404B	"Farm Hands"	Bob Camp	Bob Camp, Jim Gomez, & Ron Hauge	Stephen DeStefano	November 5, 1994	RS-315
Abner and Ewalt hire Ren and Stimpy as farm children.
55	405A	"Magical Golden Singing Cheeses"	Michael Kim	Jim Gomez & Bob Camp	Craig Kellman, Michael Kim, & Tom McGrath	November 12, 1994	RS-404
Stimpleton tries to save himself and Renwaldo from starvation by looking for food.
56	405B	"A Hard Day's Luck"	Chris Reccardi	Story by : Chris Reccardi, Lynne Naylor, & Vince Calandra	Lynne Naylor & Chris Reccardi	November 12, 1994	TBA
Haggis MacHaggis must pass tests by a leprechaun to get his dream: a full head of hair. Guest star: Alan Young as Haggis MacHaggis
57	406A	"I Love Chicken"	Ron Hughart	Bob Camp & Jim Gomez	Peter Avanzino	November 19, 1994	TBA
Stimpy falls in love with a store-bought chicken and this starts to irritate Ren as all that he sees the chicken as is his dinner.
58	406B	"Powdered Toast Man vs. Waffle Woman"	Chris Reccardi	Story by : Vince Calandra, Chris Reccardi, & Bob Camp	Lynne Naylor	November 19, 1994	TBA
Powdered Toast Man fights his nemesis, Waffle Woman. Guest star: Gail Matthius as Waffle Woman
59	407A	"It's a Dog's Life"	Ken Bruce	Jim Gomez & Bob Camp	Tom McGrath	December 3, 1994	RS-408
Ren and Stimpy are saved from the pound gas chamber when a seemingly normal, wealthy old lady buys them, but things start to go awry.
60	407B	"Eggyölkeo"	Bob Camp	Jim Gomez & Bill Wray	Stephen DeStefano	December 3, 1994	RS-402
Renwaldo, the Egg Smithëe, makes his own son out of egg yolks and wishes that he were a real boy.
61	408A	"Double Header"	Michael Kim	Jim Gomez & Bob Camp	Tom McGrath	January 7, 1995	TBA
After standing in the middle of the street waiting for the bus to take Stimpy as far away from Ren as possible (to Ursa Minor), the duo are peculiarly sewn together due to them being sent to a discount hospital and have to work at a circus to get money.
62	408B	"The Scotsman in Space"	Bob Camp	Bob Camp, Jim Gomez, & Bill Wray	Stephen DeStefano	January 7, 1995	RS-412
Commander Höek (Ren) and Cadet Stimpy discover a bizarre Scotsman (Haggis MacHaggis) outside their spaceship and find a wallet attached to his hinder (literally). Guest star: Alan Young as Haggis MacHaggis
63	409A	"Pixie King"	Ron Hughart	Ron Hauge, Jim Gomez, Bill Wray, & Bob Camp	Stephen DeStefano	January 14, 1995	TBA
While the duo, as pixies, strive to earn their wings, Ren wants to be "King of the Pixies". Wilbur Cobb makes an appearance as a pixie. Guest star: Jack Carter as Wilbur Cobb
64	409B	"Aloha Höek"	Bill Wray	Jim Gomez, Bill Wray, & Bob Camp	Bill Wray & Chris Mitchell	January 14, 1995	TBA
While Ren would rather be in a stinky whale head on a deserted island, Stimpy is at the Big Kahuna's tropical paradise. Guest star: Dom DeLuise as The Big Kahuna
65	410A	"Insomniac Ren"	Steve Loter	Story by : Bob Camp, Jim Gomez, & Vince Calandra	Tom McGrath	January 21, 1995	TBA
Ren has a 6:00 a.m. tee-off in the morning, but cannot get any sleep. Stimpy attempts to help him, including reading him a story from Edgar Allan Poe's collection, but fails. Eventually, the next morning, Ren's golfing friends (and Stimpy) decide to knock him out for five dollars.
66	410B	"My Shiny Friend"	Bill Wray	Ron Hauge, Jim Gomez, Bill Wray, & Bob Camp	Bill Wray & Bob Camp	January 21, 1995	RS-413
Stimpy starts to have a severe addiction to watching television and Ren, on numerous occasions, tries to stop him (including destroying the TV with a shovel at one point). Note: A clip from the episode can be seen on a TV set from the 1996 film The Cable Guy.
67	411A	"Cheese Rush Days"	Mark Marren	Story by : Vince Calandra	Kirk Field	February 11, 1995	TBA
Ren and Stimpy are pioneers in search of high-country blue cheese. Then, Ren traps Stimpy and co. inside a blue-cheese filled mine because of his own tiny nugget.
68	411B	"Wiener Barons"	Bob Camp	Ron Hauge, Jim Gomez, & Bob Camp	Peter Avanzino	February 11, 1995	RS-415
Ren and Stimpy want to become Wiener Barons of Canada.
69	412A	"Galoot Wranglers"	Craig Bartlett	Ron Hauge & Jim Gomez	Jim Kammerud	March 4, 1995	RS-420
Wilbur Cobb tells Ren and Stimpy a Western story about galoots.
70	412B	"Ren Needs Help!"	Bob Camp	Jim Gomez & Bob Camp	Chris Reccardi	March 4, 1995	RS-418
Stimpy has to put Ren into an insane asylum after he tries to kill himself by jumping into a garbage disposal (though this is after Stimpy unintentionally destroyed all of his stuff) and he cannot handle the asylum.
71	413A	"Ol' Blue Nose"	Steve Loter	Ron Hauge, Bob Camp, & Billy West	Mark O'Hare	March 18, 1995	RS-401
Stimpy becomes a successful singer. After having enough of getting hit by Ren, Stimpy's nose decides to leave Stimpy and embark on his own singing career, rendering Stimpy unable to sing well. Ren and Stimpy return to their home, and eventually Stimpy's nose returns to him after his career falters.
72	413B	"Stupid Sidekick Union"	Ron Hughart (uncredited); Tom McGrath	Bob Camp & Jim Gomez	Tom McGrath, Stephen DeStefano, Mitch Schauer, Jeff "Swampy" Marsh, & Dan Povenmire (uncredited)	March 18, 1995	RS-423
Stimpy demands better working conditions on the show and goes on strike. Ren tries out a few replacements, with dire results. Stimpy sneaks into the show's studio in disguise and gets Ren to sign in his autograph book, which actually contains a new labor contract. Stimpy returns to the show and Ren needs to ask his permission and pay him in order to hit him.
73	414A	"Superstitious Stimpy"	Bob Camp	Ron Hauge, Jim Gomez, & Bob Camp	Peter Avanzino	April 1, 1995	RS-421
Stimpy becomes superstitious when Tuesday the 17th arrives and Ren denies all of this until it's revealed that he was born on that day, so Stimpy has to help him with his bad luck.
74	414B	"Travelogue"	Arthur Filloy	Jim Gomez	Arthur Filloy	April 1, 1995	RS-406
Ren and Stimpy decide to travel to a strange new island called Acromeglia.

=== Season 5 (1995–96) ===
This season's episodes were interspersed with the short segments "Varicose Veins", "Dog Water II" and "Kraftwork Corner", which were held over from the previous season, as well as short segments from previous seasons. All episodes were produced as part of the fourth season, delayed and forced to air as a Nickelodeon-"commissioned" fifth season.

The final two episodes were originally banned from airing on Nickelodeon due to subject matter, airing on MTV instead. They eventually aired on Nickelodeon in reruns.

No. overall ^{[a]}	No. in season ^{[a]}	Title	Directed by	Written by	Storyboard by	Original release date	Prod. code	Viewers (millions)
75	501A	"Space Dogged"	Steve Loter	Jim Gomez & Bob Camp	Tom McGrath	June 3, 1995	RS-429	1.79 (HH)
Ren and Stimpy are the first dog and cat sent up to space in the Russian space program. Guest star: Phil Hartman as the Russian Space Program Film Narrator
76	501B	"Feud for Sale"	Ron Hughart	Bob Camp, Jim Gomez, Vince Calandra, & Ron Hauge	Chris Reccardi	June 3, 1995	TBA	1.79 (HH)
"There's That Man Again!" plays a salesman who outwits Abner Dimwit and Ewalt Nitwit.
77	502A	"Hair of the Cat"	Ken Bruce	Ron Hauge	Kirk Field	July 1, 1995	TBA	N/A
Ren is unaware that he is allergic to Stimpy's cat hair and as a result suffers everything imaginable. When Ren gets wise, Stimpy is isolated to a pickle jar.
78	502B	"City Hicks"	Ken Bruce	Vince Calandra	Jim Kammerud & Arthur Filloy	July 1, 1995	TBA	N/A
Ren and Stimpy leave the country when it rains and their dust fields are ruined with "useless" fruits and vegetables, but do not have much luck in the city at first.
79	503A	"Stimpy's Pet"	Steve Loter	Vince Calandra, Jim Gomez, & Bob Camp	Brian Smith, Dan Root, & Steve Loter	October 7, 1995	RS-434	N/A
Stimpy takes care of Sid the Abandoned Circus Clown. Guest star: Phil Hartman as Sid the Abandoned Circus Clown
80	503B	"Ren's Brain"	Chris Reccardi	Story by : John K. & Richard Pursel	Chris Reccardi	October 7, 1995	RS-414	N/A
Stimpy re-enters the world of science as a "freelance brain surgeon". He soon runs out of good brains to conduct experiments on, so (à la "Stimpy's Invention") Stimpy removes Ren's brain and the brain (not realizing that he's out of the body) goes on with his life until he notices Stimpy with a new dog: him.
81	504A	"Bell Hops"	Ken Bruce	Jim Gomez, Vince Calandra, & Ron Hauge	Jim Kammerud	October 28, 1995	TBA	N/A
Ren and Stimpy get jobs as bellhops and must make sure that no one finds out who is living in the top two floors of the hotel, but their curiosity gets the best of them. Guest star: Mark Hamill as Mr. Noggin
82	504B	"Dog Tags"	Ken Bruce	Ron Hauge	Jim Kammerud	October 28, 1995	TBA	N/A
Ren brings a disguised Stimpy to the annual Dog Lodge. This turns out to be a mistake by letting his feline friend to Dog Lodge and the two dogs refusing Ren to join in the lodge by thinking that he is some type of a different animal such as a mosquito. And so, the two dogs are having Ren to do a traditional dog test to prove to them that he is a canine.
83	505A	"I Was a Teenage Stimpy"	Tom McGrath	Bob Camp, Vince Calandra, & Jim Gomez	Tom McGrath & Stephen DeStefano	November 4, 1995	TBA	N/A
Right before Ren is about to enjoy his new "Corn" magazines, he find out that Stimpy is starting his journey into adolescence, complete with all of its trials and tribulations which at first Ren is fine with (since he knows that it's just the journey to adolescence), but starts to get irritated and the last straw is when Stimpy steals his "Corn" magazines.
84	505B	"Who's Stupid Now?"	Michael Kim	Michael Kim	Andrew Stanton (uncredited)	November 4, 1995	RS-439	N/A
When the producer tells Ren and Stimpy that their show is about to be cancelled (thus breaking the fourth wall again), Ren comments that they'll do anything to keep the show ongoing, so the producer makes "a twist in chemistry" by making Stimpy the skinny jerk cat and Ren as the fat idiot dog, but Ren starts to realize that this might not be a good idea.
85	506A	"School Mates"	Mark Marren	Jim Gomez	Brian Smith	November 11, 1995	RS-435	N/A
An old obedience school friend of Ren's comes over for a surprise visit and is appalled that Ren is living a middle class lifestyle with a house cat.
86	506B	"Dinner Party"	Steve Loter (uncredited)	Vince Calandra	Rob Koo & Armen Melkonian	November 11, 1995	TBA	N/A
Ren hosts a dinner party featuring a cast of unusual characters, with help from houseboy Stimpy. Note: This episode marks the final appearance of Haggis MacHaggis, the final appearance of Mrs. Pipe, and the penultimate appearance of Mr. Pipe.
87	507B	"Big Flakes"	Ken Bruce	Ron Hauge, Jim Gomez, & Bob Camp	Tom McGrath, Kirk Field, Louie del Carmen, Jeff "Swampy" Marsh, & Dan Povenmire (additionals)	November 18, 1995	RS-422	N/A
Ren and Stimpy are going on vacation in the winter. They arrive at the cabin, but they get snowed in and unfairly remain snowed in during the summer meltdown.
88	507A	"Pen Pals"	Tom Owens & Craig Bartlett	Ron Hauge	Michael Kim, Mitch Schauer, Jeff "Swampy" Marsh, & Dan Povenmire (additionals)	November 18, 1995	RS-430	N/A
Ren and Stimpy are watching TV when they see the grand opening of a new jail where the prisoners are treated like kings. Now they attempt to get in jail, only to find out that the commercial was a complete lie.
89	508A	"Terminal Stimpy"	Arthur Filloy	Jim Gomez, Bob Camp, & Vince Calandra	Kirk Field & Bob Camp	December 9, 1995	RS-425	N/A
After going through seven of his lives, Stimpy becomes extremely cautious before enduring the steps towards accepting death.
90	508B	"Reverend Jack"	Craig Bartlett	Bob Camp & Jim Gomez	Stephen DeStefano	December 9, 1995	RS-419	N/A
Ren and Stimpy work for a "reverend" who preaches about cheese and meat, but the duo starts to see that the reverend is a bit weird. Guest star: Frank Gorshin as Reverend Jack Cheese
91	509	"A Scooter for Yaksmas"	Bob Camp	Story by : Bob Camp, Jim Gomez, & Vince Calandra	Bob Camp, Tom McGrath, & Stephen DeStefano	December 16, 1995	TBA	N/A
When Stimpy does not get a present he wanted, he steals the titular bike and goes on a quest to meet Stinky Whizzleteats. Note: This episode was the last to air in the original Nickelodeon run, with the two remaining episodes airing a year later on MTV.
92	510A	"Sammy and Me"	Bill Wray	Jim Gomez & Bill Wray	Stephen DeStefano & Bill Wray	October 20, 1996	RS-424	N/A
Stimpy's Sammy Mantis Jr. fan club kit arrives in the mail and Stimpy is overjoyed. Ren is sick of Stimpy's crazy obsession with Sammy Mantis, and soon, Stimpy begins stalking the Mantis Man. Guest star: Tommy Davidson as Sammy Mantis
93	510B	"The Last Temptation"	Bob Camp	Jim Gomez, Vince Calandra, & Bob Camp	Bob Camp	October 20, 1996	RS-440	N/A
After Ren has a near-death experience, he tries to be nicer to Stimpy (with the help of Wilbur Cobb). After he repays Stimpy money he had stolen from his piggy bank over the years (up to $1 million), he ends up rich.

== DVD releases ==
=== Episode order ===
The 2004/2005 DVD releases order the Ren & Stimpy cartoons into the following episodes:

The First and Second Seasons
1. Stimpy's Big Day! / The Big Shot!
2. Robin Höek / Nurse Stimpy
3. Space Madness / The Boy Who Cried Rat!
4. Fire Dogs / The Littlest Giant
5. Marooned / Untamed World
6. Black Hole / Stimpy's Invention
7. Ren's Toothache / Rubber Nipple Salesmen
8. Sven Höek
9. Haunted House / Mad Dog Höek
10. In the Army / Big House Blues
11. Big Baby Scam / Dog Show
12. Monkey See, Monkey Don't! / Powdered Toast Man
13. Fake Dad / Out West
14. Stimpy's Fan Club
15. The Great Outdoors / The Cat That Laid the Golden Hairball
16. A Visit to Anthony
17. The Royal Canadian Kilted Yaksmen
18. Son of Stimpy
19. Man's Best Friend

Seasons Three and a Half-ish
1. To Salve and Salve Not! / No Pants Today
2. A Yard Too Far / Circus Midgets
3. Ren's Pecs / An Abe Divided
4. Stimpy's Cartoon Show
5. Jimminy Lummox / Bass Masters
6. Ren's Retirement
7. Jerry the Bellybutton Elf / Road Apples
8. Hard Times for Haggis
9. Eat My Cookies / Ren's Bitter Half
10. Lair of the Lummox
11. Hermit Ren
12. House of Next Tuesday / A Friend in Your Face!
13. Blazing Entrails / Lumber Jerks
14. Prehistoric Stimpy / Farm Hands
15. Magical Golden Singing Cheeses / A Hard Day's Luck
16. I Love Chicken / Powdered Toast Man vs. Waffle Woman
17. It's a Dog's Life / Eggyölkeo

Season Five and Some More of Four
1. Double Header / The Scotsman in Space
2. Pixie King / Aloha Höek
3. Insomniac Ren / My Shiny Friend
4. Cheese Rush Days / Wiener Barons
5. Galoot Wranglers / Ren Needs Help!
6. Ol' Blue Nose / Stupid Sidekick Union
7. Superstitious Stimpy / Travelogue
8. Space Dogged / Feud for Sale
9. Hair of the Cat / City Hicks
10. Stimpy's Pet / Ren's Brain
11. Bellhops / Dog Tags
12. I Was a Teenage Stimpy / Who's Stupid Now?
13. School Mates / Dinner Party
14. Pen Pals / Big Flakes
15. Terminal Stimpy / Reverend Jack
16. A Scooter for Yaksmas
17. Sammy and Me / The Last Temptation
