= Sammy and Me =

- The Ren & Stimpy Show episode
- Episode no.: Season 5 Episode 8a
- Directed by: Bill Wray
- Written by: Jim Gomez; Bill Wray
- Original air date: October 20, 1996 (MTV)

Guest appearance
- Tommy Davidson as Sammy Mantis

Episode chronology
← Previous "Dinner Party"	Next → "Big Flakes"

"Sammy and Me" is an episode of the fifth season of The Ren & Stimpy Show. It originally aired on MTV on October 20, 1996, as the penultimate episode from the fifth season to premiere; it is the second episode to premiere on the network after "Son of Stimpy" and the second to be banned by Nickelodeon after "Man's Best Friend".

== Plot ==
Ren and Stimpy live together. Stimpy hides in their letter box when Jasper the mail carrier delivers a package, which he tries his best to stuff into the box by punching but fails. An excited Stimpy runs to his tree house where he unwraps a kit of his favorite celebrity Sammy Mantis, a caricature of Sammy Davis Jr. which includes replica of Sammy's gold chain, tap shoes, a screw-on thorax and a glass eye, which he screws on his eye.

Stimpy dresses up as Sammy and tries to get Ren to recognize him but fails, but wins him over by singing "The Mantis Man" (a parody of Davis' cover of "The Candy Man"), Sammy's most favorite song which Ren knows the lyrics of, but jokingly recognizes him as the wrong celebrity again. Annoyed, he relents while Stimpy attempts to chew his head, telling him to go to bed instead. Stimpy tries to get Ren tell him a story, which Ren does under the condition Stimpy licks his toes and throws away his treasured boogers, but is more reluctant when the story is about Sammy; he reads the synopsis and burns the book, much to Stimpy's chagrin. Stimpy leaves in the middle of the night to find Sammy, leaving Ren a note on a pillow which Ren burns.

Stimpy goes to town for a signing when Sammy arrives in front of him; the crowd rush towards him and demand autographs, causing him to leave immediately as he is annoyed of their uncivilized behavior. Stimpy stalks Sammy at his residence and takes a garbage can, emptying it at home to relish Sammy's garbage; it is clear Stimpy has a dangerous obsession towards Sammy. He returns to Sammy's residence, where he sees Sammy partying with multiple insect caricatures of celebrities such as Jerry Lewis, Dean Martin and Liberace (Liberoachie). Sammy and Liberoachie perform a duet of "The Mantid Man", which Stimpy misses after passing out from excitement. Liberoachie, also a fan of Sammy, demands that Sammy bite his head off (a reference to mantis' sexual cannibalism), which he reluctantly does so. This gruesome act leaves Liberoachie brain-damaged instead of dead. Stimpy calls him lucky.

Stimpy wanders to Sammy when he is at the balcony, causing him to be confronted; Sammy recognizes him from the signing. Stimpy notes that he stole all of Sammy's exoskeletons in his obsession, as he is focused on his task to meet Sammy, crying in the process. Sammy, distraught and disgusted by Stimpy's lack of morals, decides to bite his head off, which Stimpy sees as a blessing, but not before they perform a duet. A brain-damaged, gleeful Stimpy returns home and has his glass eye screwed on what is left of his head. Ren bids him goodnight, ending the episode.

== Cast ==
- Billy West as Ren, Stimpy and Liberoachie
- Tommy Davidson as Sammy Mantis

== Production ==
"Sammy and Me" was produced as part of the series' fourth season and was intended to air during a Nickelodeon-"commissioned" fifth season. Stephen DeStefano produced the storyboards alongside director Bill Wray. Animation was provided by Mr. Big Cartoons. Actor Tommy Davidson was hired to voice Sammy Mantis because of his convincing impression of Sammy Davis Jr., of which Sammy Mantis is a caricature of.

It was planned to air alongside "Big Flakes" on November 18, 1995. but the episode's graphic violence, most notably the scene where Stimpy gouges his eye out to replace it with a glass eye, caused it to be banned from initially airing on the network. Wray regretted adding it and requested the scenes be removed for it to air, but executive producer Vanessa Coffey refused to preserve the episode's integrity, despite being the one barring it from airing. As a result, "Pen Pals" would take over its spot to air alongside "Big Flakes".

The episode eventually aired on MTV on October 20, 1996, alongside "The Last Temptation", an episode directed by showrunner Bob Camp that was banned for its religious overtones and on which Wray also worked on backgrounds.

== Reception ==
American journalist Thad Komorowski gave the episode three and a half out of five stars, noting the celebrity cameos to be heavy handed but considered the episode to be humorous.

== Books and articles ==
- Dobbs, G. Michael (2015). Escape – How Animation Broke into the Mainstream in the 1990s. Orlando: BearManor Media. ISBN 978-1593931100.
- Komorowski, Thad (2017). Sick Little Monkeys: The Unauthorized Ren & Stimpy Story. Albany, Georgia: BearManor Media. ISBN 978-1629331836.
