= Toon-Us-In =

South Korean animation studio

Toon-Us-In was an American-Korean animation studio that animated episodes of The Ren & Stimpy Show, Captain Simian & the Space Monkeys, Watership Down: Home on the Down, some Peanuts specials, and Love Story of Juliet. In addition, they animated the main titles for Hey Arnold!.

== The Ren & Stimpy Show ==
Episodes of The Ren & Stimpy Show they animated:

- "Chicken in a Drawer" segment
- Untamed World short after "Hermit Ren"
- "Magical Golden Singing Cheeses"
- "Double Header"
- "My Shiny Friend"
- "Ren Needs Help!"
- "Ol' Blue Nose"
- "City Hicks"
- "Ren's Brain"
- "Who's Stupid Now?"
- "Varicose Veins" segments
- "Pen Pals"
- "Dog Water" and "Craft-Works Corner: Stimpy Kadoogan" segments
- "The Last Temptation"
