= Reverend Jack =

- The Ren & Stimpy Show episode
- Episode no.: Season 5 Episode 18
- Directed by: Craig Bartlett
- Written by: Bob Camp; Jim Gomez
- Production code: RS-419
- Original air date: December 9, 1995

Guest appearance
- Frank Gorshin as Reverend Jack Cheese

Episode chronology
| ← Previous "The Last Temptation" | Next → "A Scooter for Yaksmas" |

"Reverend Jack" is the eighteenth and penultimate episode of the fifth season of The Ren & Stimpy Show. It originally aired on Nickelodeon in the United States on December 9, 1995.

== Plot ==
Ren and Stimpy are hired by accomplished genius Reverend Jack Cheese to operate his meat theatre. The local children love the theatre, jumping out of windows to follow their van as they hear the jingle. Stimpy reminds Jack to start holding the show; Jack is shown for the first time, with the words "pity" and "self-pity" on his hands and holding a kielbasa.

Jack starts the show after Stimpy hands him his screw-on thumb to play his one-stringed guitar. He preaches the "gospel of meat", with meat puppets being portrayed by the duo. A cow appears, distraught towards the show and knowing Jack's true nature, and throws rocks to harass Jack; Ren is flattened by a meat-made cow puppet and hit with a rock. It is clear that the children do not like Jack's show and are only there for the meat he shows and sells, which Ren and Stimpy helps with.

At night, Stimpy counts their earnings for the day, including bottle caps paid by children in malice. Meanwhile, Jack rests in his bed of meat and drinks barbecue sauce, disliking the way Stimpy applies the sauce on his body when he clearly wants it for the taste. He orders the duo to do rapid and absurd manual labor in preparation of a "ceremony", including his buttocks needing to be "flat and square"; Stimpy steals a slab from a baseball match where the Pope is playing for this. Jack wears his meat robe and hat and has his innards coated with ice, before starting the ceremony, where he cuts blood sausages as a homage to meat.

The next day, Jack wakes up with a vision where his father apparently tells him to learn to drive. He demands Ren to keep driving without serving any children, to the point the meat starts to rot and tiring the duo out. Stimpy finds Jack sitting and doing nothing, prompting Jack to "lecture" him about the importance of the meat over that of children while pumping false tears. Suddenly, they are confronted by Jasper the police officer, who notes that they have drove with a gasoline pump dragged miles from the filling station connected to the fuel tank, while running over two "Circus Midgets" in the meantime. Jasper is disgusted by the sight of Jack in the rotting meat, revoking his license to sell meat and immediately ending his career. Jack leaves with a cow's carcass and promises to be back.

Four years later, Ren and Stimpy had taken over Jack's business, revamping the show to be more watchable while being paid more fairly without Jack's meddling. Jack still follows them every show to pelt rocks at them out of spite like the cow from earlier, but the duo have already adapted with protective equipment against this act, ending the episode.

== Cast ==
- Billy West as Ren and Stimpy
- Harris Peet as Jasper
- Frank Gorshin as Reverend Jack Cheese
- Michael Pataki as Cow

== Production ==
"Reverend Jack" is the third and last episode in the series to be directed by Craig Bartlett, following after "Galoot Wranglers" and "Pen Pals". He had just successfully pitched Hey Arnold! to Games Animation while working as a story editor to Rugrats at Klasky Csupo, and was given directorial work on The Ren & Stimpy Show before production of the series can officially start, starting with the season four episode "Galoot Wranglers". He was told not to tamper with the episodes' writing whenever he directed, serving as what he considered a "mechanic" role. Much like Barlett's previously directed "Pen Pals", Mitch Schauer also worked on this episode as assistant storyboard artist, and he too had successfully pitched The Angry Beavers to Games Animation while working on Freakazoid! at Warner Bros. Animation and Amblin Television; and he also was working on Rocko's Modern Life for Games Animation at the same exact time. Dan Povenmire and Jeff "Swampy" Marsh also worked on the episode under additional storyboard artists, and were also working on Rocko for Games Animation, and they would later go on to develop Phineas and Ferb for Disney Television Animation, after their pitch to Nick ended up failing.

The episode features its titular character, Reverend Jack Cheese, who is an unsubtle caricature of series creator John Kricfalusi; aside from a similar appearance, Jack's mental instability and abuse of his subjects (in this case Ren and Stimpy) is evidently taken from his impression according to crew members at Games Animation, which led to his termination of the company in 1992. Camp himself created the character as his personal "payback" towards Kricfalusi since he first met him when he worked on Mighty Mouse: The New Adventures, a reboot of the Terrytoons character Mighty Mouse, knowing his public, toxic manipulation towards Nickelodeon and Games Animation, like how in scenes featuring constant harassment of Ren and Stimpy depict Kricfalusi's actual subjects of harassment from individuals or otherwise with no involvement or knowledge in the situation. John Kricfalusi himself noted that he believed Nickelodeon simply wanted to capitalize on his poor public image with this episode, according to the commentary of its DVD release in 2005. Kricfalusi was also immediately rejected, and banned, from Games Animation, after pitching his Terrytoons revival; coincidentally, Ren & Stimpy's network Nickelodeon was already purchased by Viacom in 1994, which also had the Terrytoons library, and at the same year, had also bought Paramount Pictures, which at the same time also bought the Terrytoons library.

== Reception ==
American journalist Thad Komorowski gave the episode four out of five stars, praising the episode by calling it "a sufficient knowledge of its in-jokes," as well as being a clever parody of ritual cults.

== Books and articles ==
- Dobbs, G. Michael (2015). Escape – How Animation Broke into the Mainstream in the 1990s. Orlando: BearManor Media. ISBN 978-1593931100.
- Komorowski, Thad (2017). Sick Little Monkeys: The Unauthorized Ren & Stimpy Story. Albany, Georgia: BearManor Media. ISBN 978-1629331836.
