= The Last Temptation (The Ren & Stimpy Show) =

- The Ren & Stimpy Show episode
- Episode no.: Season 5 Episode 10a
- Directed by: Bob Camp
- Written by: Jim Gomez; Vince Calandra; Bob Camp
- Original air date: October 20, 1996

Guest appearance
- Jack Carter as Wilbur Cobb

Episode chronology
← Previous "Terminal Stimpy"	Next → "Reverend Jack"

"The Last Temptation" is an episode of the fifth season and the series finale of The Ren & Stimpy Show. Initially banned from airing on Nickelodeon due to its religious themes, it premiered on MTV alongside "Sammy and Me", another banned episode on October 20, 1996, making it the last episode from the season to air, as well as the final episode from the Nickelodeon series altogether, not counting "Man's Best Friend", which would eventually air as part of Adult Party Cartoon on Spike TV in 2003.

== Plot ==
On a typical morning, Stimpy cooks breakfast for Ren, who is getting impatient; Stimpy hurriedly adds an "oatmeal lump" to finish Ren's oatmeal. Ren swallows the giant lump while Stimpy goes off to watch television; he suddenly chokes on the lump, yelling for help as he suffocates to death. Stimpy does not hear him as he has headphones on.

In his dying moments, Ren reminisces his time with Stimpy. Stimpy had been in his mother's womb for unknown reasons, with an infantile Ren punching him away; the duo participate in an unknown war, where Stimpy needs to urinate and Ren forces him to use the only toilet, unfortunately at the enemy's side where soldiers shoot him. Ren's soul leaves his body, disappointingly staring at Stimpy watching a sad and ultimately comedic moment on the television before leaving for purgatory.

In purgatory, he stops off at the house of God, meeting his gardener Wilbur Cobb. He shows Ren weeds and his "cigar beetle", which are embodiments of his negative traits, urging Ren to correct his mistakes with a second chance and secretly letting him back into the living world. It is discovered that Mr. Pipe is God, who regrets hiring Wilbur for his incompetence but has no knowledge of his betrayal.

Stimpy continues watching television with Ren's corpse, dislodging the lump before Ren's soul returns to his body. He pledges to do good, burning his most prized possessions, celebrity wigs. The next day, he returns money he stole from Stimpy over the last two decades, with the total being $1 million. Weeks later, Stimpy had used up all the money to buy lavish goods while Ren meditates, having "reformed" from the grace of Wilbur Cobb. He is distasteful of Stimpy's material possessions and lives a life of frugality, whipping himself while eating straws and rocks for dinner; in comparison, Stimpy eats a luxurious meal. He chokes on ham while Ren lectures him, with Wilbur Cobb appearing to Ren when he ponders about acquiring Stimpy's belongings. He does the right thing of saving Stimpy, which Wilbur Cobb rewards by ensuring his survival without fear of being sent back to purgatory, but in exchange for having Stimpy's belongings seized as evidence of Ren's goodwill. The duo cry for their loss, ending the episode and the series.

== Cast ==
- Billy West as Ren, Stimpy and God
- Jack Carter as Wilbur Cobb

== Production ==
"The Last Temptation" was produced with and intended to air on December 9, 1995 with "Reverend Jack", but was banned from airing on Nickelodeon due to its mocking of religion. "Terminal Stimpy", a similar episode that dealt with death, would eventually take over its spot. Its airing on MTV on October 20, 1996, a year after the series wrapped production, made it an unofficial series finale, even though it was merely a rerun; the episode eventually aired on Nickelodeon during reruns. As a part of an effort to improve ratings in light of the immense controversy that Kricfalusi's sacking had caused, Camp recruited as a recurring guest star, the comedian Jack Carter, to provide the voice of Wilbur Cobb, a character first introduced in "Stimpy's Cartoon Show", as Carter had fallen into hard times and Camp was sorry for him. Camp would eventually give Carter as many opportunities to voice the character as he can to stabilize his life, a move criticized by crew members like Bill Wray for being detrimental to the episodes' quality. This episode would also be Cobb's final appearance.

== Reception ==
American journalist Thad Komorowski gave the episode three and a half out of five stars.

== Books and articles ==
- Dobbs, G. Michael (2015). Escape – How Animation Broke into the Mainstream in the 1990s. Orlando: BearManor Media. ISBN 978-1593931100.
- Komorowski, Thad (2017). Sick Little Monkeys: The Unauthorized Ren & Stimpy Story. Albany, Georgia: BearManor Media. ISBN 978-1629331836.
