= Space Dementia =

Space Dementia may refer to:

- "Space Dementia" (song), by Muse
- A fictional mental disorder, mentioned in several works:
  - "Space Madness", a 1991 episode of the animated series The Ren and Stimpy Show
  - Fragile Allegiance, a 1996 PC game
  - Armageddon, a 1998 feature film
  - "Joyride", a 1999 episode of the TV series The Outer Limits
  - "Coup by Clam", a 2002 episode of the TV series Farscape
  - "The Train Job", a 2002 episode of the TV series Firefly
