= Terminal Stimpy =

- The Ren & Stimpy Show episode
- Episode no.: Season 5 Episode 17
- Directed by: Arthur Filloy
- Written by: Jim Gomez; Vince Calandra; Bob Camp
- Production code: RS-425
- Original air date: December 9, 1995

Episode chronology
← Previous "Pen Pals"	Next → "The Last Temptation"

"Terminal Stimpy" is the seventeenth episode of the fifth season of The Ren & Stimpy Show. It originally aired on Nickelodeon in the United States on December 9, 1995.

== Plot ==
Ren and Stimpy live in a giant barrel. Ren reads a newspaper while Stimpy feels like he had been hit by a bus. Curiously, there is an obituary of Stimpy being run over by a bus and presumed missing. Ren asks Stimpy about his nine lives when he eats irresponsibly, which he counts. His first death was by Ren starting his car while he sits inside the engine for warmth, second with Stimpy intervening in an execution by shooting in Mexico during their travels, third with Stimpy struck by lightning while farming, fourth with Stimpy drowning to settle Ren's gambling debts, fifth with Stimpy swallowed by a snake and suffocating in the Amazon rainforest, with his sixth and most recent having Stimpy run over during a blizzard. Ren reminds him that he has two lives left. Stimpy goes off to turn on the furnace for Ren's bath, hammering the pipe and lighting a match which increases his risk of death, only to be killed by blue ice from a plane where Mr. Horse pilots and defecates.

Stimpy wakes up with an irrational fear of death, scared that he will use up his last life. He walks with tissues in the floor to avoid nonexistent death traps, only to be shocked by Ren eating a week-old sandwich from the trash can. Stimpy thus exhibits the five stages of grief. He first shows anger, where Stimpy assaults Ren with the toast he demanded during breakfast; Ren unusually does not retaliate out of his fear of Stimpy's rare anger. He then shows denial (mistakenly switched with anger), where he plucks a flower's petals and says he is not dying while frolicking in nature. He shows bargaining, literally bargaining with Ren over luxury furniture they had obtained. He shows depression, becoming drunk and addicted at a milk bar. He finally shows acceptance when he witnesses Muddy Mudskipper crashing his car and dying from his injuries; he helps Muddy with his favors before Muddy finally dies from being run over by a bus.

Stimpy returns home with a new outlook on life; he finally accepts his impeding but still far away death, which Ren approves. Ren lights a candle on a cupcake to celebrate his acceptance, ironically killing them both as they had neglected the flammable fumes from the furnace from earlier. They ascend to heaven where the Announcer Salesman bars them from entering; Ren tries to pay but he refuses money, instead accepting luxury furniture. Ren and Stimpy are bewildered by this, ending the episode.

== Cast ==
- Billy West as Ren, Stimpy, Mr. Horse, Alfred Hitchcock-esque announcer, and That Guy (Salesman)
- Harris Peet as Muddy Mudskipper
- Michael Pataki as the cow

== Production ==
The episode was directed by Arthur Filloy, one of the many alumnus of Mr. Big Cartoons from Sydney, Australia. After directing the animation for "Blazing Entrails", he left the company due to low pay but was convinced by an angry Jim Ballantine (whom he did not notify about his departure) to be hired at Games Animation, with a higher wage at the condition that he directs the animation all contracted episodes at Mr. Big Cartoons. This is the second and last episode of the series where he serves as general director after "Travelogue", while also being the last with the involvement of Mr. Big Cartoons. This is also the last episode with involvement by Mark Marren, who produced the storyboards with showrunner Bob Camp while credited under the pseudonym Kirk Field.

== Reception ==
American journalist Thad Komorowski gave the episode three and a half out of five stars, noting it to be "pleasantly morbid".

== Books and articles ==
- Dobbs, G. Michael (2015). Escape – How Animation Broke into the Mainstream in the 1990s. Orlando: BearManor Media. ISBN 978-1593931100.
- Komorowski, Thad (2017). Sick Little Monkeys: The Unauthorized Ren & Stimpy Story. Albany, Georgia: BearManor Media. ISBN 978-1629331836.
