= Blazing Entrails =

- The Ren & Stimpy Show episode
- Episode no.: Season 4 Episode 4
- Directed by: Bob Camp
- Written by: Bob Camp; Jim Gomez; Bill Wray
- Production code: RS-307
- Original air date: October 15, 1994

Guest appearances
- Bill Mumy as Dr. Brainchild; June Lockhart as Mrs. Brainchild

Episode chronology
| ← Previous "A Friend in Your Face!" | Next → "Lumber Jerks" |

"Blazing Entrails" is the fourth episode of the fourth season of The Ren & Stimpy Show. It originally aired on Nickelodeon in the United States on October 15, 1994. The episode is a parody of the 1966 science fiction film Fantastic Voyage.

== Plot ==
Stimpy wakes up in the middle of the night, seemingly brain-damaged from an offscreen event. He hammers his teeth instead of brushing them, rinses his mouth with dog shampoo, and saws off half of his nose to trim a nose hair. That morning, he cooks "bacon and eggs" for Ren, which is in fact part of his tongue and his eyes. Ren forces him to see a "doctor", Dr. Brainchild, who can "fix his brain". They are greeted by his mother, a one-eyed woman with a swollen head. Dr. Brainchild himself is a green-skinned child with a similarly swollen head.

Dr. Brainchild determines that Stimpy has a lack of brain activity which might mean death, so he requests Ren go in to investigate. After Ren is sent into Stimpy's colon, he lights a match in the darkness, only to be blown up by Stimpy's flammable farts.

Ren rides a train made of intestines to the stomach, during which he is harassed by a corn and a coin swallowed by Stimpy. He enters the stomach alongside numerous antibodies. He falls in love with a female antibody, who accidentally swallows his skeleton when kissing him. They spend a year together; when he attempts to tell his children antibodies a story, he remembers Stimpy and immediately continues his journey. He climbs to the nasal cavity when Stimpy's mucus washes him away. He hangs on to a booger, which causes Stimpy to pick him instead of his booger. Stimpy places him in his ear, incidentally the passage to his brain.

Ren finds Stimpy's ignorance gland holding his brain hostage. A chimpanzee delivers Dr. Brainchild's notice of Stimpy deflating, but Ren could not make it out after distracting the ignorance gland. Stimpy returns to normal, watching television happily while Ren comfortably sits inside his brain, ending the episode.

== Cast ==
- Billy West as Ren and Stimpy
- Bill Mumy as Dr. Brainchild
- June Lockhart as Dr. Brainchild's mother
- Bob Camp as Corncob

== Production ==
The episode was storyboarded by Bob Camp and Stephen DeStefano. Arthur Filloy worked on the episode as animation director before he left Mr. Big Cartoons due to low pay. Games Animation was not notified of this termination, immediately swooping in to hire Filloy, paying him according to his demands on the condition that he directs all animation of episodes assigned by Nickelodeon. Guy Moon, who composed such shows as Cow and Chicken, The Fairly OddParents, Danny Phantom, The Grim Adventures of Billy and Mandy, and Back at the Barnyard, did additional composing and lyrics for the title card of the episode, along with Camp, Bill Wray, Andy Paley, and Charlie Brissette. Moon would go on to do composing and lyrics for the series finale "A Scooter for Yaksmas".

== Reception ==
Thad Komorowski gave "Blazing Entrails" four stars out of five praising the episode's intelligent usage of gross humor as a parody of Fantastic Voyage.

== Books and articles ==
- Dobbs, G. Michael (2015). Escape – How Animation Broke into the Mainstream in the 1990s. Orlando: BearManor Media. ISBN 978-1593931100.
- Komorowski, Thad (2017). Sick Little Monkeys: The Unauthorized Ren & Stimpy Story. Albany, Georgia: BearManor Media. ISBN 978-1629331836.
