= A Scooter for Yaksmas =

- The Ren & Stimpy Show episode
- Episode no.: Season 5 Episode 19
- Directed by: Bob Camp
- Story by: Bob Camp; Jim Gomez; Vince Calandra
- Original air date: December 16, 1995

Episode chronology
← Previous "Reverend Jack"	Next → "Onward & Upward"

"A Scooter for Yaksmas" is the nineteenth episode of the fifth season of The Ren & Stimpy Show. It originally aired on Nickelodeon in the United States on December 16, 1995.

== Plot ==
Stimpy works at Cobbco where he manufactures fudge pop sticks and earns one stick as his income, with another half being offered as a bonus as it is Yaksmas Eve. On the way home, he is harassed by children and walks to a store where he stares at a scooter he had always wanted; after returning home, he constantly puts reminders to Ren to buy him the scooter for him as a gift. Ren seemingly ignores them and is served chopped liver for dinner; he is annoyed by the liver being in the shape of a scooter.

Stimpy decorates the house in preparation of the festivities, while Ren considers him to be childish; he is dressed up as a rabbit against his wishes. The sleigh dropping sausages with the shaven yak driving appears, finally revealing Stinky Wizzleteats to be a drunken slob. The sleigh crashes, prompting the yak and Stinky to drop down the sewers and emerge in Ren and Stimpy's house. They dip the duo's hands in warm water, load sausages in their long johns and pre-chewed gum in their shoes and collect Stimpy's pickled eggs before passing out in their yard and leaving. Realizing what happened, Ren takes back his arguments and frolics with Stimpy. Stink and the yak return to "The West Pole".

Ren and Stimpy unpack their gifts: Ren gets a jewel-encrusted golden statue of the Queen of England, which Stimpy managed to deliver, while Stimpy gets fudge pop sticks, which he already has a lot of, from Ren. Stimpy breaks down, believing Ren to be unacceptably stingy, and leaves the house in sorrow while Ren seemingly does not mind while unscrewing the jewelry from the statue.

Stimpy returns to the scooter shop and breaks down again, calming when he accidentally breaks the glass and gets the scooter; an old lady calls for help, prompting a police officer to chase Stimpy as he escapes on the scooter; they miss him while they pass through a bridge he is under. Meanwhile, Ren calls for Stimpy to come home. At night, Stimpy sleeps under the bridge, where he dreams of being convicted for the theft, being insulted by Ren, the yak, the woman and the policeman while being sentenced by Stinky in a judge's costume life imprisonment for crimes against humanity. He wakes up and decides to go home, only to find Ren on a television show talking about his absence, fearing that he might have caused destruction outside; Stimpy leaves sorrowfully.

At a filling station's bathroom, Stimpy disguises himself to avoid legal trouble, immediately driving away to find Stinky Wizzleteats. His disguise comes off when he becomes exhausted and accidentally crashes into a morbidly obese man, who befriends him and sits in the front, but betrays him when he discovers Stimpy's arrest warrant. Meanwhile, Ren talks with Muddy Mudskipper on his show about Stimpy's disappearance.

Stimpy drives for 3000 more miles when the front tire pops; he is sent flying and lands right on top of the West Pole, revealed to be a motel. Stimpy finds the scooter to be destroyed, brings it to Stinky, only to find out his true nature; he and the yak are drunken slobs who spend their days wasting away and sustaining on treats offered by children. Stimpy finds a package which Stinky forgot to deliver; it is directed to him from Ren, turning out to be a new scooter. Overjoyed by Ren's hidden generosity, Stimpy prepares to leave with the new scooter, but not before leaving behind the scooter, believing Stinky will fix it. After he leaves, the police barge into the motel, having followed Stimpy; they arrest Stinky and the yak for stealing the scooter, as Stimpy had placed the scooter on his body. The next day, Ren, Stimpy and the statue ride on the scooter in joy, while Stinky and the yak are almost shot dead while escaping on the faulty scooter, ending the episode.

== Cast ==
- Billy West as Ren and Stimpy
- Bob Camp as Stinky Wizzleteats
- Harris Peet as Muddy Mudskipper
- June Lockhart as Old Lady
- Cheryl Chase and Cree Summer as various children

== Production ==
"A Scooter for Yaksmas" was the final episode of the series to be produced, with director Bob Camp's unit shutting down immediately after the episode was completed. Storyboards were completed by Tom McGrath and Stephen DeStefano alongside Camp in one last bid to do so for the series, with Bill Wray painting backgrounds for the final time. Due to its nature, it aired as a double-length special in the manner of "Son of Stimpy"; coincidentally, this makes Bob Camp and series creator John Kricfalusi both being laid off after completing a Christmas special double the length of a normal episode.

Following completion of the episode (as well as the final segment for the episode), the majority of animators from the Games facility moved on production for two new productions Hey Arnold! and The Angry Beavers, both of which were created by Craig Bartlett and Mitch Schauer, respectively, two of which also worked on The Ren & Stimpy Show during the Games years. Other animators, including Tom McGrath himself, left to work on Space Jam for Warner Bros. Animation, of which the show's voice actor Billy West was a part of. McGrath would go on to work at DreamWorks Animation for such films as the Madagascar franchise, as well as Megamind and The Boss Baby. Guy Moon, who composed such shows as Cow and Chicken, The Fairly OddParents, Danny Phantom, The Grim Adventures of Billy and Mandy, and Back at the Barnyard, did additional composing and lyrics for this episode's musical number, along with Camp, West, Cheryl Chase, McGrath, DeStefano, Andy Paley, and Charlie Brissette. Other crew members that also worked on the show, especially since the Spümcø era, also left the series after completion of the episode; most notably West, who became an established voice actor by this point. He was already voicing such characters for the film Space Jam during the making of the episode, and would go on to be best known for his roles in Futurama.

== Reception ==
American journalist Thad Komorowski gave the episode three out of five stars, calling it a likable Christmas special but considered it "intensely tired" and inferior to "Son of Stimpy".
