= Ren Needs Help! =

- The Ren & Stimpy Show episode
- Episode no.: Season 4 Episode 23
- Directed by: Bob Camp
- Written by: Jim Gomez; Bob Camp
- Original air date: March 4, 1995

Episode chronology
| ← Previous "Galoot Wranglers" | Next → "Superstitious Stimpy" |

"Ren Needs Help!" is the twenty-third episode of the fourth season of The Ren & Stimpy Show. It originally aired on Nickelodeon in the United States on March 4, 1995.

== Plot ==
Ren and Stimpy live in an upgraded mobile home. Ren's already fragile mental state had deteriorated significantly, making him senile and uncommunicative. He spends his days babbling gibberish and cherishing his collection, including his glass tables autographed by Desi Arnaz, Raymond Burr and Danny Thomas. Stimpy, who was forced to and surprisingly able to adapt to being the provider of the household, working in an unspecified job to support Ren, returns to find Ren playing with lipstick while sitting in the bath with more trophies, which could be interpreted as him slicing the insides of his mouth. Despite his new sense of responsibility, Stimpy never lost all of his stupidity; he plays golf in the living room, shattering Danny Thomas' table; Ren comes out of the bathroom, utterly devastated by the mess Stimpy caused, prompting him to attempt suicide by throwing himself into the house's trash compactor. In what could be Stimpy's most emotionally intelligent moment, he immediately calls a psychiatric hospital named Shady Brain Farm to send Ren away; the medics confuse Ren's chair with Ren (due to the moose head on top), but manage to retrieve a near-dead Ren. Stimpy is relieved and exhausted as the medics depart.

Ren adapts to his new surroundings when all patients, who are mostly recurring characters from the series, are summoned to group psychotherapy. Their psychiatrist is Dr. Sloth, a literal sloth who takes what seems like forever to settle in his seat and start the session. The first to speak out, the Fire Chief, repeats conspiracy theories he has of the institution, including the near-inedible food and that the President of the United States is fake, dons a fake suit and makes speeches on the moon. Dr. Sloth does not actually make notes, instead completing a crossword to feign effort. Muddy Mudskipper does not discuss his problem, instead provokes the shaven yak into mania with the word "cheese", who then grates his buttocks with a grater before being taken away and returning in a straitjacket. It is time for Ren to state his problem, admitting that he violently reacts to Stimpy's stupidity. Given the event that led to him being institutionalized, the others patients and Dr. Sloth try to avoid him and tell him to go to bed. After a dejected Ren leaves, the patients ironically make progress as they discuss with Dr. Sloth about Ren in a civilized way with no conflicts.

At night, Ren sleeps under the Fire Chief in a bunk bed, where he writes a letter to Stimpy; he hopes Stimpy can read and will visit. Months later, Ren takes his lunch, expecting actual food but only to be served creamed corn by Muddy. Stimpy does visit him with an infant; this attempt in therapy backfires as the infant resembles the ugly prison officer. The following meal, he finally snaps after months of eating creamed corn; this makes the Fire Chief reply with cheese, which provokes the yak to grate his buttocks again. In a sudden moment of rationality, he tells everyone they are merely idiots with traumatizing pasts, which makes the trio feel better about themselves; they gratefully escape the compound, while Ren, the only actually insane individual in the institution, is captured. He is lobotomized, dressed in a fake suit, proclaimed the President of the United States, resembling as President Ronald Reagan, and transported to the Moon. He makes a speech where "We begin bombing in five minutes", as the episode ends.

== Cast ==
- Billy West as Ren, Stimpy and Dr. Sloth
- Harris Peet as Fire Chief, Yak and Muddy Mudskipper

== Production ==
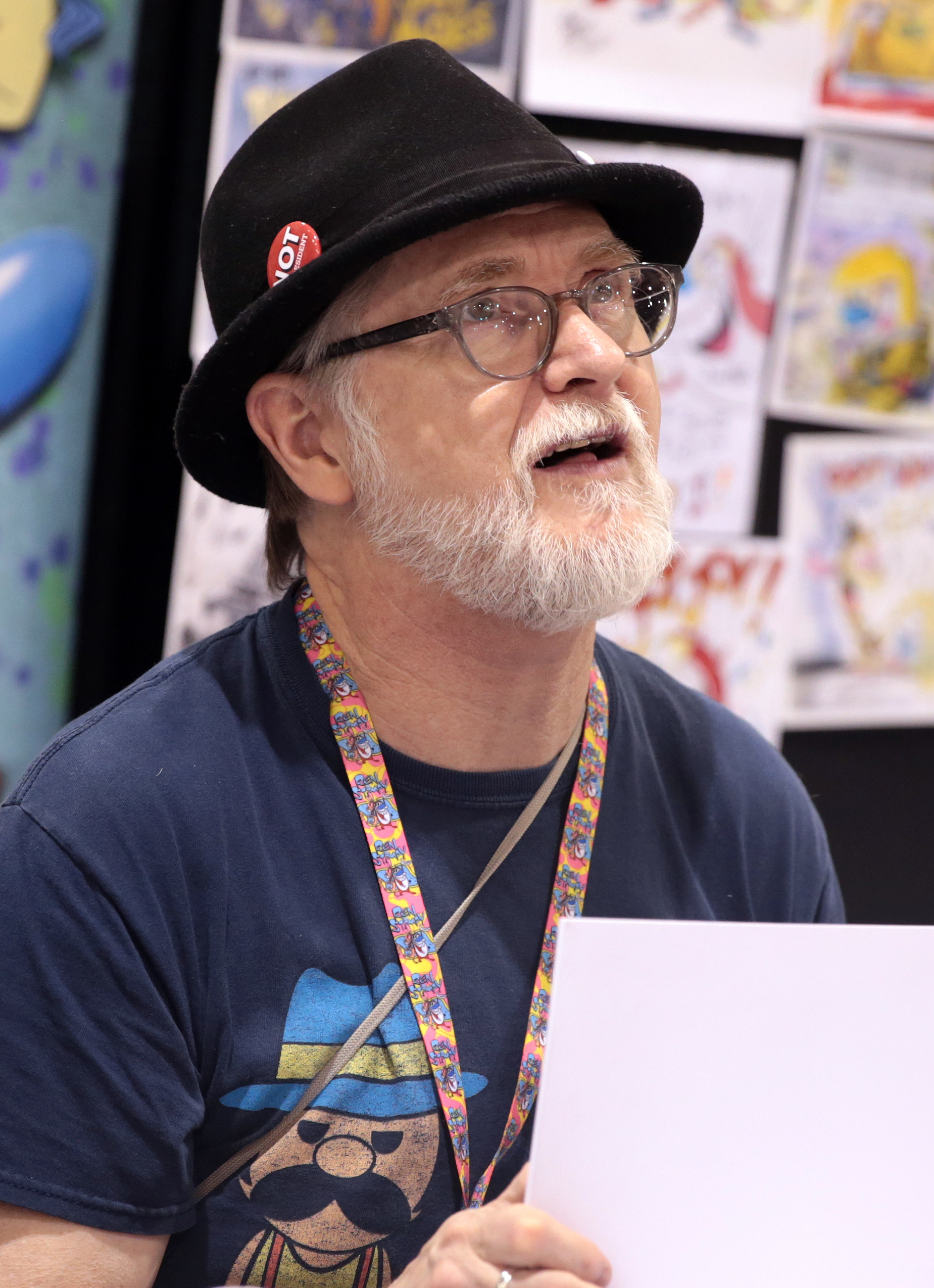
Along with Jim Gomez, showrunner Bob Camp (pictured; 2018) retooled John Kricfalusi and Richard Pursel's storyline for the episode specifically for season four, just two years after Kricfalusi was terminated from Nickelodeon for good.

The show's original creator John Kricfalusi always wanted to make an episode where Ren seeks psychiatric therapy, so he and Richard Pursel wrote an outline of "Ren Gets Help" together at Spümcø before his firing due to his malevolent behavior, as well as the episode "Man's Best Friend", which caused Nickelodeon to pull it from airwaves, making it the final straw from their executive standpoint. Showrunner Bob Camp would use this concept to make a "psychodrama" episode, which the Games Animation crew had only done once with the season four premiere "Hermit Ren" following Kricfalusi's firing. Instead of straight up adapting the episode like he had with Pursel's outlines, he instead used a parody of the 1975 film One Flew Over the Cuckoo's Nest, based on the novel of the same name. He recruited the storyboard artist and director for "Hermit Ren", Chris Reccardi, to storyboard the episode, as he was the only draftsman who is capable of executing an episode with violent subject matter well, with the others having refused to join the studio out of distaste; Reccardi worked at the studio sparingly, only doing so for episodes he was responsible in conceptualizing. Kricfalusi would eventually remake the original outline as "Ren Seeks Help" as part of Ren & Stimpy "Adult Party Cartoon" for Spike TV, noting "Ren Needs Help!" to be inferior in animation, due to the work of Toon-Us-In not comparable to that of Carbunkle Cartoons, if not in story to his episode. A few scenes were cut from the official DVD release. One such scene was when Ren being taken to the psychiatric hospital, the second is with Dr. Sloth appearing for the first time, the third is where he is serving corn for the first time, and the final scene is Ren and Stimpy in visiting hours where Stimpy gave birth to a baby.

== Reception ==
American journalist Thad Komorowski gave the episode three and a half out of five stars, noting this episode was more inferior to Kricfalusi's version, suffering from his absence, as well as both absences of writer Jim Smith and animation director Bob Jaques, instead of highlighting Camp and Reccardi's strengths, though he noted the episode to be appropriately ambitious.

== Books and articles ==
- Dobbs, G. Michael (2015). Escape – How Animation Broke into the Mainstream in the 1990s. Orlando: BearManor Media. ISBN 978-1593931100.
- Komorowski, Thad (2017). Sick Little Monkeys: The Unauthorized Ren & Stimpy Story. Albany, Georgia: BearManor Media. ISBN 978-1629331836.
