= Pen Pals (The Ren & Stimpy Show) =

- The Ren & Stimpy Show episode
- Episode no.: Season 5 Episode 16
- Directed by: Tom Owens; Craig Bartlett
- Written by: Ron Hauge
- Original air date: November 18, 1995

Episode chronology
← Previous "Big Flakes"	Next → "Terminal Stimpy"

"Pen Pals" is the sixteenth episode of the fifth season of The Ren & Stimpy Show. It originally aired on Nickelodeon in the United States on November 18, 1995.

== Plot ==
Ren and Stimpy are vagrants of society, living in a mobile home owned by Ren's mother for the last decade. Ren is angered by the advertisement of a high-end prison with luxuries when a policeman arrives to confiscate the mobile home for Ren's illegal activity. Remembering the prison advertisement and angry at Stimpy's mockery, he decided to commit crimes to enter the prison, imagining a life of luxury.

The duo somehow acquire a missile offscreen and uses it to instigate a bank robbery, which the police arrive in tanks to take them to a dog pound. They shoot the duo, causing the missile to explode, making the policemen escape and severely injuring the duo. They decide to break into the prison with a grappling hook, which beheads the taxidermized body of the policeman's dog Rascal. While Ren and Stimpy slide down the rope, Ren gets up by stepping on Stimpy, who falls down, only to find the policeman hooking the grappling hook into a cannonball and shooting him out from a cannon in vengeance, exploding at a hill far away.

Their second plan is to climb through the sewers, a much safer and efficient method. They decide to hide when they see the policeman, only for the cell's inhabitant Kowalski (implied to have been serving his sentence from "Fake Dad") to return. Ren and Stimpy disguise as feces, which angers Kowalski enough to flush them away.

Their third plan is to assault the prison with a catapult. Stimpy catapults a flaming projectile, luring Kowalski to escape with a jingle reminding him of his mother. Another projectile enables the escape of the entire prison, 1000 fugitives; the policeman could only watch as the escapes get on the news and the policeman is spitefully quoted as being indifferent. For their crimes, the duo are reluctantly given 13 life sentences by the policeman, who admits defeat, but manages to retaliate by locking a gargantuan cellmate with them; Ren is disappointed by their fate, ending the episode.

== Cast ==
- Billy West as Ren, Stimpy, TV announcer, and Policeman
- Bob Camp as Kowalski

== Production ==
"Pen Pals" is the second episode in the series to be directed by Craig Bartlett. He had just successfully pitched Hey Arnold! to Games Animation while working as a story editor to Rugrats at Klasky Csupo, and was given directorial work on The Ren & Stimpy Show before production of the series can officially start, starting with the season four episode "Galoot Wranglers". He was told not to tamper with the episodes' writing whenever he directed, serving as what he considered a "mechanic" role. Tom Owens, a layout supervisor served as co-director in his only directorial role. Mitch Schauer also worked on the episode as assistant storyboard artist, and he too had successfully pitched The Angry Beavers to Games Animation while working on Freakazoid! at Warner Bros. Animation and Amblin Televsion; Schauer also was working on Rocko's Modern Life for Games Animation at the same exact time. Dan Povenmire and Jeff "Swampy" Marsh also worked on the episode under additional storyboard artists, and were also working on Rocko for Games Animation; Povenmire and Swampy would later go on to develop Phineas and Ferb for Disney Television Animation many years later.

It was the last episode with the involvement of Michael Kim (a protégé according to series creator John Kricfalusi), who storyboarded the episode. He also co-wrote the episode with fellow Seinfeld writer Ron Hauge (who had also written most Games era episodes up until that point). Kim had worked on the series since late in the Spümcø, having to work on every episode as a layout artist until his firing, once Kricfalusi was dissatisfied at his inability to provide large amounts of layouts in little time during the production of "Man's Best Friend". Kim would eventually be among the studio's alumni who migrated to Games Animation after Kricfalusi's termination from Nickelodeon. Since then he would write such episodes as "Stimpy's Cartoon Show", "Ren's Bitter Half", "Double Header", and "Who's Stupid Now?". He would go on to work for Fox Television Animation to become a storyboard artist for Futurama, then as director for American Dad!, and currently as director for Family Guy.

== Reception ==
American journalist Thad Komorowski gave the episode three and a half out of five stars, liking the funny jokes and neat concept.

== Books and articles ==
- Dobbs, G. Michael (2015). Escape – How Animation Broke into the Mainstream in the 1990s. Orlando: BearManor Media. ISBN 978-1593931100.
- Komorowski, Thad (2017). Sick Little Monkeys: The Unauthorized Ren & Stimpy Story. Albany, Georgia: BearManor Media. ISBN 978-1629331836.
