= Ron Hauge =

American screenwriter

- Occupations: Screenwriter, producer
- Years active: 1991–present

Ron Hauge is an American television writer and executive producer.

Early in his career, Hauge was a contributor to National Lampoon. In 1989 he created a graphic for Spy Magazine captioned "The World Championship," with wars between countries organized in the form of a tournament bracket; more than 20 years later, it was still being lauded, in The Atlantic, in a political scientist's blog, and on Twitter.

He then wrote for Seinfeld, In Living Color, The Ren & Stimpy Show, Rocko's Modern Life, The Mouse and the Monster, and a short lived reincarnation of The Carol Burnett Show. In 1994, an episode of Ren and Stimpy that he co-wrote was nominated for an Emmy Award for Outstanding Animated Program (for Programming One Hour or Less).

Hauge joined The Simpsons staff in its eighth season. He won an Emmy for writing the season eight episode "Homer's Phobia", which was his first episode. The Fox censor objected to the episode's exploration of the theme of homosexuality and stated that it was "unsuitable for broadcast". The censors were later fired and their replacements did not have any objections to the episode.

== Writing credits ==
=== The Simpsons episodes ===
Hauge has written the following episodes:

- "Homer's Phobia" (1997)
- "The Canine Mutiny" (1997)
- "Miracle on Evergreen Terrace" (1997)
- "Dumbbell Indemnity" (1998)
- "Mayored to the Mob" (1998)
- "Treehouse of Horror X" ("Life's A Glitch, and Then You Die") (1999)
- "Missionary: Impossible" (2000)

=== The Ren & Stimpy Show episodes ===
As sole writer:

- "Road Apples" (1994)
- "Eat My Cookies" (1994)
- "Hair of the Cat" (1995)
- "Dog Tags" (1995)
- "Pen Pals" (1995)

As co-writer:

- "Circus Midgets" (1993)
- "An Abe Divided" (1993)
- "Jimminy Lummox" (1994)
- "Ren's Retirement" (1994)
- "Ren's Bitter Half" (1994)
- "House of Next Tuesday" (1994)
- "Lumber Jerks" (1994)
- "Prehistoric Stimpy" (1994)
- "Farm Hands" (1994)
- "Pixie King" (1994)
- "My Shiny Friend" (1994)
- "Wiener Barons" (1995)
- "Galoot Wranglers" (1995)
- "Superstitious Stimpy" (1995)
- "Ol' Blue Nose" (1995)
- "Feud for Sale" (1995)
- "Bell Hops" (1995)
- "Big Flakes" (1995)

=== Rocko's Modern Life ===
- "Who's for Dinner?" (1993), along with Vince Calandra
- "Rocko's Happy Sack" (1993), along with Joe Murray
- "Clean Lovin'" (1993), along with Joe Murray, Vince Calandra, Nick Jennings and George Maestri

=== Seinfeld episodes ===
- "The Marine Biologist" (1994)
- "The Fusilli Jerry" (1995)

== Personal life ==
Hauge grew up in Montana, but moved to Manhattan and said (about being born in Montana) that he thought he had "been born in the wrong place." Hauge lives in Los Angeles.
