= Stimpy's Cartoon Show =

- The Ren & Stimpy Show episode
- Episode no.: Season 3 Episode 7
- Directed by: Bob Camp
- Story by: Elinor Blake (uncredited); John Kricfalusi
- Production code: RS-303
- Original air date: January 8, 1994

Guest appearance
- Jack Carter as Wilbur Cobb

Episode chronology
← Previous "An Abe Divided"	Next → "Jimminy Lummox"

"Stimpy's Cartoon Show" is the seventh episode of the third season of The Ren & Stimpy Show. It originally aired on Nickelodeon in the United States on January 8, 1994.

== Plot ==
Stimpy spends a long time in the basement trying to make an animated film, attracting Ren's attention. He is motivated by his idolization of Wilbur Cobb, a successful animator past his prime. Ren tries to discourage him from doing it, but he notices that Stimpy actually has talent; he had won a reputable award, which led to Ren feeling guilty about his own lack of talent. He wants to help Stimpy, but knowing he cannot draw or contribute much to production, he bursts out into tears. In order to cheer Ren up, Stimpy assigns him as the producer, which Ren finds tempting due to its seeming lack of work and stealing the credit from the animator, prompting him to happily accept the offer. This proves to be Stimpy's undoing.

Stimpy works tirelessly on the cartoon. Ren squanders their money on a luxurious lifestyle while he abusively limits Stimpy's budget and time, to the point that Stimpy has to pay Ren for pencils and making his own paper. One night, Stimpy is almost finished on the storyboards, only for Ren (dressed as John Kricfalusi) to appear, where he mercilessly destroys most of the scenes save for four unrelated scenes. Stimpy is horrified and heartbroken by the undoing of his work.

Finally completed a barely acceptable storyboard, Stimpy animates the film by himself, spending countless days and nights laboring. He is overworked and physically and mentally fatigued, but Wilbur Cobb's portrait inspires him to finish the job. Stimpy edits the film on a hand-cranked viewer while Ren happily cuts the film randomly with scissors. He finally finishes the film, collapsing out of exhaustion.

Stimpy shows the film to Ren, who had worsened his already lavish habits. Despite Stimpy's exhaustion ruining the film, Ren approves it; they then bring it to Wilbur Cobb, who is revealed to be a senile old man whose body is falling apart. Wilbur lectures the duo, implying that he had become successful for ripping off animators before fighting in both World Wars; he devolves into rambling nonsense while his ear and teeth drop out, horrifying the duo.

Wilbur and the duo finally watch the finished product, a well-animated but nonsensical film starring "Explodey the Pup" titled "I Like Pink"; he likes it. It is later revealed that Wilbur is in prison, on death row for an unspecified crime apparently severe enough for the death penalty. The trio sit in the electric chair as Wilbur pulls the switch, resulting in all three of them being electrocuted to death, ending the episode.

== Cast ==
- Billy West as Ren, Stimpy and Explodey the Pup
- Jack Carter as Wilbur Cobb

== Production ==
The episode had its origins in 1992, when series creator John Kricfalusi developed an idea for a story where Ren works as a producer constantly out of touch with the animators as a parody of Nickelodeon network executives whom he constantly fought with. The executives were displeasured with this idea, and Kricfalusi received a memo vetoing the episode that read: "You thought we had a sense of humor about ourselves – we don't." However, the network still decided to buy the rights to the story despite vetoing it after Kricfalusi insisted that it was not about the network executives. On September 21, 1992, Kricfalusi was fired from the series and Spümcø lost the contract for The Ren & Stimpy Show, to be replaced with the newly founded Games Animation studio. Bob Camp reworked Kricfalusi's script into its current state. Camp stated in 1993 that, unlike Kricfalusi – whose ideas were often censored –, 95% of the material in the Games Animation scripts was not being censored. As a part of an effort to improve ratings in light of the immense controversy that Kricfalusi's sacking had caused, Camp recruited as a recurring guest star the comedian Jack Carter to provide the voice of Wilbur Cobb, a character first introduced in the episode, as Carter had fallen into hard times and Camp was sorry for him. Camp would eventually give Carter as many opportunities to voice the character as he can to stabilize his life, a move criticized by crew members like Bill Wray for being detrimental to the episodes' quality.

Camp described "Stimpy's Cartoon Show" as the story of a producer who does nothing but take all the credit for the work of others. Many of the characteristics that Ren has a producer were those often ascribed to Kricfalusi. The script for "Stimpy's Cartoon Show" was written by Elinor Blake, Kricfalusi's then-girlfriend who would later be notable as a musician in her own right, and she in turn had based her script on Kricfalusi's vetoed story of 1992. Chris Reccardi returned to Games Animation, having left the studio and becoming a freelance artist, to storyboard the episode with Michael Kim. Kricfalusi considered Kim to be a highly talented individual, realizing his talent from his work on The New Adventures of Beany and Cecil. He made him his protégé and convinced him to back off from working on Batman: The Animated Series at Warner Bros. Animation with higher pay. Kim worked on every episode as a layout artist until his firing, where Kricfalusi was dissatisfied at his inability to provide large amounts of layouts in little time during the production of "Man's Best Friend". Kricfalusi was credited as a co-writer of the episode. Everyone credited on the episode's title card had their names badly rewritten to resemble the unintelligent Stimpy's poor attempt in writing, including "John Krisfaloosy", "Kris Reccardy" and "Baughb Camp". Rough Draft Korea at Seoul provided animation for the episode. Three scenes were cut after its initial airing, never to be released in home media, including a scene where Ren mercilessly cuts Stimpy's film while he edits it on a stationary bicycle.

== Reception ==
American critic Thad Komorowski gave "Stimpy's Cartoon Show" four and a half out of five, calling it one of Games Animation's best episodes on the series; he considered the final scene to be one of Bob Camp's best work.

== Books ==
- Dobbs, G. Michael (2015). Escape – How Animation Broke into the Mainstream in the 1990s. Orlando: BearManor Media. ISBN 978-1593931100.
- Komorowski, Thad (2017). Sick Little Monkeys: The Unauthorized Ren & Stimpy Story. Albany, Georgia: BearManor Media. ISBN 978-1629331836.

== See also ==
- Happy Happy Joy Joy: The Ren and Stimpy Story – a 2020 documentary film about the creation of Nickelodeon's animated series The Ren & Stimpy Show and the downfall of the show's creator John Kricfalusi.
