= April March =

American singer-songwriter (born 1965)

- Born: Elinor Lanman Blake; April 20, 1965 (age 61); New York City, New York, U.S.
- Genres: Indie pop
- Occupations: Singer-songwriter, animator
- Instruments: vocals, guitar
- Years active: 1985–present
- Website: aprilmarch.com

April March (born Elinor Lanman Blake; April 20, 1965) is an American singer-songwriter. Considering herself to be a "lifelong Francophile", she performs in the English and French languages. March is notable for her France Gall/Serge Gainsbourg-based cover song "Chick Habit" ("Laisse tomber les filles"), which was featured in Jamie Babbit's 1999 film But I'm a Cheerleader and in Quentin Tarantino's 2007 film Death Proof.

April March is also a professional writer, illustrator, and animator, whose work includes the Jack White children's book We're Going to Be Friends and visual creations for Pee-wee's Playhouse, motion credits for Madonna's movie and video Who's That Girl, and others. She worked as a layout artist on Nickelodeon's The Ren & Stimpy Show and wrote the episodes "Stimpy's Fan Club" and "Stimpy's Cartoon Show"; both episodes were produced after John Kricfalusi's firing from the series, as she was among those who refused to join Games Animation alongside Kricfalusi, Jim Smith, Vincent Waller and Richard Pursel.

April March founded her first band, The Pussywillows, in 1987. Since then, March has recorded as a solo artist and has appeared in motion picture soundtracks, as well as performing the theme song for the Cartoon Network series I Am Weasel.

== Education ==
April March participated in a French junior high student exchange program: "French culture was something my mother presented to me as a greener pasture when I was a little girl." She graduated in 1983 from Phillips Academy, Andover, Massachusetts. Afterward, March studied with Parsons School of Design and also the Disney-founded Character Animation Program at California Institute of the Arts.

== Personal life ==
She briefly dated John Kricfalusi during her employment at Spümcø.

== Discography ==
=== Albums ===
- Gainsbourgsion! (1995) – Released in France and Japan
- April March Sings Along with the Makers (1996) – Collaboration with The Makers
- Paris in April (1996) – International expanded version of Gainsbourgsion!
- Chrominance Decoder (1996)
- Superbanyair (1997) (Japanese version of Chrominance Decoder)
- April March and Los Cincos (1998) – Collaboration with Los Cincos
- Triggers (2002)
- Magic Monsters (2008) – Collaboration with Steve Hanft
- April March & Aquaserge (2013) – Collaboration with Aquaserge
- In Cinerama (2021) – Originally a "Record Store Day"-only release, before a wide release in 2022
- April March Meets Staplin (2023) – Collaboration with Staplin

=== EPs ===
- Chick Habit (1995)
- April March and Los Cincos Featuring the Choir (1998) – Japan-only limited edition featuring Petra Haden and Bennett
- Dans les yeux d'April March (1999) – Released in France
- Sometimes When I Stretch (2003)
- Palladium (2021) – Collaboration with Olivia Jean

=== Singles ===
- "Voo Doo Doll / Kooky" (1994)
- "Jesus And I Love You" (1998) – Orgazmo Soundtrack
- "Garçon Glaçon"(1999) – Nothing New (Remix) as B-Side
- "Mignonette" (1999) – Mon Petit Ami as B-Side
- "Sugar (Remix)" (1999)
- "RosEros" (2010) – Collaboration with Bertrand Burgalat
- "Lift Off" (2022)

=== Compilations ===
- Lessons of April March (1998) – Compilation
