= Dog Show (The Ren & Stimpy Show) =

- The Ren & Stimpy Show episode
- Episode no.: Season 2 Episode 3b
- Directed by: John Kricfalusi; Chris Reccardi
- Written by: Richard Pursel
- Production code: RS5-3B
- Original air date: December 12, 1992

Episode chronology
| ← Previous "Big Baby Scam" | Next → "Son of Stimpy" |

"Dog Show" is the tenth episode of the second season of The Ren & Stimpy Show. It originally aired on Nickelodeon in the United States on December 12, 1992. It is the final appearance of George Liquor in the series, as John Kricfalusi was fired midway through production and reclaimed the rights to the character, utilizing him as Spümcø's mascot.

== Plot ==
George Liquor has entered his pets Ren and Stimpy into a dog show despite the fact that Stimpy is a Manx cat; he had attempted to train the duo to extraordinary success some time ago. George braids Ren's ears with bows and massages his gums to maintain his dental hygiene; he notices Ren's tail and immediately docks him with a rubber band (though not permanently). He tries to brush the duo's fur, unintentionally shaving Stimpy's fur as well as Ren's skin, revealing his skeleton. Despite their seemingly dreadful condition, George brings them to the pre-judging round. Mr. Horse serves as the judge.

Mrs. Buttloaves' dog Periwinkle was the first to be judged; despite its acceptable weight and visual makeover, Mr. Horse proves his standards to be even lower than George's by chewing it, which he finds uncomfortable, hence disqualifying it. He throws the dog to a bulldog who eats it, much to Ren and Stimpy's horror. The second dog, a hyperactive poodle, was immediately disqualified, but he reveals himself to be articulate, further slandering his owner and torturous treatment before willfully accepting his impeding demise.

Ren is the third to be judged. His excessive rheum and mites in his ears are considered by Mr. Horse to be representative of Chihuahuas' sickly nature, and he is allowed entry. Ren is overjoyed, wagging his tail. Stimpy, the next "dog" to be judged, received a particularly strange reaction from Mr. Horse; he does not realize Stimpy is a cat, but Stimpy is still disqualified for having smooth buttocks. George's furious assault convinces a traumatized Mr. Horse to change his mind.

The Salesman serves as the judge for the final round. The first dog to be shown is a well-groomed greyhound, which gets a near-perfect score. Stimpy comes next, only to be disqualified again for having an ingrown claw. A furious George rips his shirt and vows to win the contest, only for Ren to talk back and tell him to compete instead. George tries to control him but could not afford to admit his loss, so he agrees. George wins the competition due to his muscular physique, despite him being obviously a human. In a humorous reversal of their relationship, George has his ego expanded with the award as the honored pet, while Ren and Stimpy celebrate in pride as if they were the owners.

== Cast ==
- Ren – voice of Billy West
- Stimpy – voice of Billy West
- George Liquor – voice of Michael Pataki
- Poodle – voice of Harris Peet
- The Salesman – voice of Billy West
- Mr. Horse – voice of John Kricfalusi
- Fat Lady – voice of John Kricfalusi

== Production ==
"Dog Show" had an extremely troubled production even by the standards of The Ren & Stimpy Show due to numerous disputes between John Kricfalusi and Nickelodeon executive Vanessa Coffey for the entire first half of 1992 over its content; its predecessor "Man's Best Friend" was banned from airing for similar reasons. The judges of the dog show were originally depicted as stereotypically effeminate gay men, and George Liquor made a number of blatantly homophobic remarks. Coffey ordered the judges to be replaced with the Mr. Horse and Salesman characters, which delayed the episode. A number of George's homophobic remarks were removed, but others such as his statement to the judge "keep this strictly professional, Mack" were retained, but left out of context. Animation was done at Rough Draft Korea in Seoul. "Dog Show" was scheduled to air on September 5, 1992, but did not air until December 12, 1992 due to aforementioned delays.

== Reception ==
American journalist Thad Komorowski gave the episode four out of five stars, considering it inferior to its predecessor but nevertheless praised it. The American critic Matt Langer described "Dog Show" as typical of the episodes that ultimately led to Kricfalusi being fired as he noted that many of the scenes of cruelty being inflicted on Ren and Stimpy by George Liquor were too extreme for a children's TV show.

== Books ==
- Klickstein, Matthew; Summers, Marc (2013). Slimed! An Oral History of Nickelodeon's Golden Age. London: Penguin Publishing Group. ISBN 9781101614099.
- Langer, Matt (June 1993). "Animatophilia, Cultural Production and Corporate Interests: The Case of 'Ren & Stimpy'". Film History. 5 (2): 125–141.
- Komorowski, Thad (2017). Sick Little Monkeys: The Unauthorized Ren & Stimpy Story. Albany, Georgia: BearManor Media. ISBN 978-1629331836.
