= Galoot Wranglers =

- The Ren & Stimpy Show episode
- Episode no.: Season 4 Episode 22
- Directed by: Craig Bartlett
- Written by: Ron Hauge; Jim Gomez
- Original air date: March 4, 1995

Guest appearance
- Jack Carter as Wilbur Cobb

Episode chronology
← Previous "Wiener Barons"	Next → "Ren Needs Help!"

"Galoot Wranglers" is the twenty-second episode of the fourth season of The Ren & Stimpy Show. It originally aired on Nickelodeon in the United States on March 4, 1995.

== Plot ==
Ren and Stimpy sit near a campfire listening to Wilbur Cobb telling a story. Ren roasts a sausage while Stimpy foolishly roasts a tire until it melts. Wilbur recalls the days before the Wild West while his nose drops off, causing him to mistake it for a sausage as he roasts it and causes it to melt.

Early on, humans (one stupid individual portrayed by Abner Dimwit) rode groundhogs until a humanoid species resembling Lummoxes, Galoots, arrived alongside a tribe of female warriors. They almost go extinct from the heat until they adapted to society, eventually spreading to the entire United States. An Indian first exploited Galoots' stupidity to use their pelt for warmth, with a Caucasian hunter portrayed by Ewalt Nitwit realizing this. The pelts become popular in Europe as a staple of high fashion, despite their unappealing appearance, with their flesh being popular as a source of meat.

The trio have ant colonies built on them due to the length of Wilbur's story, with a scorpion, who stings Wilbur's regrown nose, being eaten without any repercussions. Wilbur tells the duo about the "Galoot wranglers", with the duo embodying two who find a Galoot's "droppings", stale pizza. They find a whole colony, whom Stimpy uses a vehicle resembling fried chicken to bring them to their farm. They inspect a Galoot, who through his teeth's stains they assume he smoked (nicotine stains) and ate popcorn. Ren checks his age by checking rings in his earwax; he is 36. They brand him a tattoo, which he is proud of, alongside hoofs from hot red steel. They bring him and more Galoots to sell into slavery, but some are spared to compete in a rodeo.

The duo's prized Galoots, resembling Lummoxes from previous episodes, are made to compete in absurd events, such as fighting for food and picking a lock (it is unknown if the Galoots are smart enough to complete it). They compete in racing, with their full speed being achievable by being enraged by a wedgie. They get judged by Mr. Horse in the finals; Ren is disqualified for cheating by placing rocks in his Galoot's buttocks, but every Galoot, regardless of winning or not, are sold to be made into food; Stimpy struggles with losing his Galoot, but he does so every year and is convinced by Ren to give him up so he can save money for a new bicycle. Ren offers Stimpy a baby Galoot, whom he names Spamila, so it can be sold for food later.

Wilbur Cobb finishes his story, only to suddenly suffer a heart attack and topple onto the campfire, dying and traumatizing the duo. They hold an impromptu funeral for him and bury him, leaving with their pet Lummox Einstein as the episode ends.

== Cast ==
- Billy West as Ren and Stimpy
- Jack Carter as Wilbur Cobb

== Production ==
"Galoot Wranglers" is the first episode of the series layouts completed at Jim Kammerud's own small independent animation studio from Ohio named Character Builders, a decision to save costs that contributed to lower quality storytelling in the series, which became the main criticism for such episodes as this. This is also the first episode in the series to be directed by Craig Bartlett, who had successfully pitched Hey Arnold! to Games Animation while working as a story editor to Rugrats at Klasky Csupo. He was given directorial work on The Ren & Stimpy Show before production of the series can officially start. He was told not to tamper with the episodes' writing whenever he directed, serving as what he considered a "mechanic" role. Jack Carter appears once again as Wilbur Cobb, as showrunner Bob Camp felt sorry for his lack of work, so he allowed him to voice as many episodes as he can as the character, a source of criticism from other crew members on the series, including Bill Wray.

== Reception ==
American journalist Thad Komorowski gave the episode zero out of five stars, calling it an "unfunny spot-gag cartoon" and going as far as to call it the worst episode of the series.

== Books and articles ==
- Dobbs, G. Michael (2015). Escape – How Animation Broke into the Mainstream in the 1990s. Orlando: BearManor Media. ISBN 978-1593931100.
- Komorowski, Thad (2017). Sick Little Monkeys: The Unauthorized Ren & Stimpy Story. Albany, Georgia: BearManor Media. ISBN 978-1629331836.
