= Mr. Big Cartoons =

Australian animation studio

Mr. Big Cartoons was an Australian animation studio. Its first work was for Hanna-Barbera in the late 1980s and during the 1990s, along with animating a few episodes of The Ren & Stimpy Show for Games Animation in 1994–1996 (such as "Blazing Entrails"). Mr. Big was acquired by Southern Star Group in 1997.

== See also ==
- List of film production companies
- List of television production companies
