= Mitch Schauer =

American animation professional

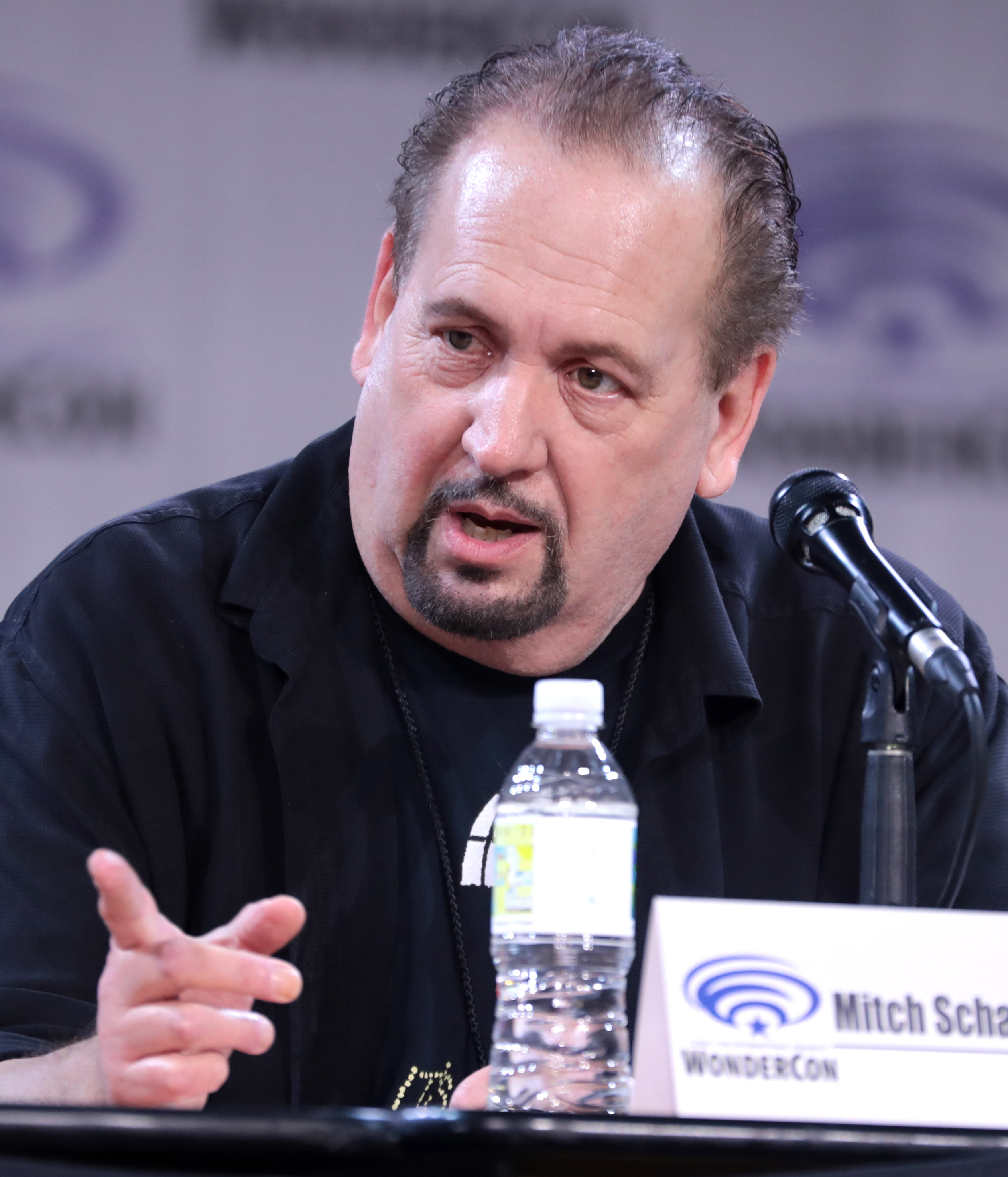
- Schauer at the 2023 WonderCon
- Born: Pawhuska, Oklahoma, U.S.
- Education: Daniel Webster High School
- Alma mater: California Institute of the Arts, ArtCenter College of Design
- Occupations: Animator, storyboard artist, director, writer
- Years active: 1976–present
- Known for: The Angry Beavers

Mitch Schauer (/ˈtʃɛaʊ/ SCHAU-ɛ-ER) is an American animation professional who has been involved with television programs and feature films since 1978. He is perhaps best known as the creator of the Nickelodeon series The Angry Beavers.

== Early life ==
Mitch Schauer graduated from Daniel Webster High School in Tulsa, Oklahoma in 1974.

Schauer briefly attended Tulsa Junior College, then studied with Disney's character animation program at California Institute of the Arts ('76–77). He graduated with a BFA degree in Advertising and Illustration from ArtCenter College of Design in 1980.

Schauer cited 1960s cartoons such as Jonny Quest, The Pink Panther, The Flintstones, and The Adventures of Rocky and Bullwinkle and Friends as primary influences for his work.

== Career ==
Besides working in animation, Schauer has also been a book illustrator including comic books (DNAgents, Jonny Quest) children's books such as Pogman. He wrote and illustrated the graphic novel Rip M.D., and was the cover artist for Famous Monsters of Filmland (2011).

Schauer began his career as an animation layout artist before becoming a freelance storyboard artist, producer, and director. He directed the intro sequence of Super Friends: The Legendary Super Powers Show and produced the first season of Freakazoid!, for which he won an Emmy Award in 1995. Schauer also worked as an assistant storyboard artist for Nickelodeon's The Ren & Stimpy Show for such episodes as "Stupid Sidekick Union" (along with Rocko's Modern Life writers and future Phineas and Ferb creators Dan Povenmire and Jeff "Swampy" Marsh) and "Pen Pals" with Hey Arnold! creator Craig Bartlett. Additionally, Schauer worked as an assistant storyboard artist on both of the Nickelodeon animated shows Rocko's Modern Life and Hey Arnold!.

In 1994, he would go on to create the pilot for The Angry Beavers, which would end up airing on Nickelodeon from 1997 until 2001, becoming the 7th Nicktoon. Schauer has also been a voice actor, voicing various characters in The Angry Beavers and Lonnie Tallbutt in Freakazoid!. His daughters, Stacy and Chelsea, voiced the main characters' younger sisters.

Schauer and Paul Rugg created and directed the web series The Sam Plenty Cavalcade of Action Show Plus Singing! for The Jim Henson Company. He also worked on Robot Chicken for Adult Swim during 2010, and he has been working on Marvel Animation projects during that era, such as The Spectacular Spider-Man. He currently works at Nickelodeon Animation Studio serving as a storyboard artist for TV shows.

On January 5, 2016, Schauer mentioned on the Apathetic Enthusiasm Podcast episode titled "The Not So Angry Animator" that he would be open to the idea of rebooting The Angry Beavers and getting the original actors involved if he could. He also revealed that his daughter Chelsea Schauer came up with the title "ReSpooted" and that Norbert would be married and he would have children with Treeflower while Daggett would still be single. On April 19, 2022, Schauer and various people who worked on the series were interviewed again by Miranda in celebration of the twenty-fifth anniversary of the series. Schauer expanded upon the "ReSpooted" idea, stating that Norbert and Treeflower's children would be two daughters named Lily and Petunia and that Daggett would still visit them from time to time. On March 18, 2025, Schauer was once again asked by a fan on Instagram if he had any more plans to bring back the series, only for him to respond "Only Paramount knows for sure."
