= Son of Stimpy =

- The Ren & Stimpy Show episode
- Episode no.: Season 2 Episode 6b
- Directed by: John Kricfalusi
- Written by: John Kricfalusi; Vincent Waller; Richard Pursel
- Production code: RS5-8
- Original air dates: January 13, 1993; (MTV; uncut); December 11, 1993 (Nickelodeon; edited)

Episode chronology
← Previous "Dog Show"	Next → "Monkey See, Monkey Don't!"

"Son of Stimpy" (originally titled "Stimpy's First Fart") is the twelfth episode from the second season of The Ren & Stimpy Show. It originally aired on MTV in the United States in January 13, 1993, after multiple delays due to its unusually long length of 21 minutes and objectionable content; an edited version would later air on Nickelodeon.

== Plot ==
A frame from the episode's infamous "homoerotic" scene

Stinky Wizzleteats serves as the narrator for this wholesome tale. Stimpy is watching cartoons when he suddenly lets out a huge fart. Believing himself to have gave birth to a flatulence being named Stinky, he attempts to brag to Ren, who rebukes him and tells him he's an idiot; Stimpy tries to renact what had happened, only for his buttocks to deflate. Ren blames it on his overactive imagination.

Stimpy searches high and low in the house to find Stinky to no avail, to the point he asks the Magic Nose Goblins he stuck under the piano seat, who ridicule him for his idiotic behavior.

A depressed Stimpy sits in front of the television motionless; Ren walks in and attempts to cheer him up by watching Commander Höek and Cadet Stimpy and The Muddy Mudskipper Show, but Stimpy is too depressed to do so. Ren, showing genuine concern, attempts again with a mouse toy and his litter box, but Stimpy breaks down upon hearing the word "stinky". Ren is too angry to continue comforting Stimpy.

Stimpy could not sleep due to his grief. However, it is immediately revealed that Stinky is indeed a gaseous sentient being, returning to the residence to reminisce his time inside Stimpy's buttocks.

It is Christmas Eve, and Stimpy had been outside the house for months yearning for Stinky's return. Ren tries to get him to decorate the house for Christmas to no avail, so he uses his final trick up his sleeve by pointing him to the mistletoe while looking at him romantically, but Stimpy sees through this trick and leaves, to Ren's overwhelming sadness.

Stimpy wanders to the city, where he attempts to ask for info on Stinky to no avail; he tries to get warmness from a manure shop owned by Mr. Horse, but is run over by a truck; Stinky arrives to reminisce of his time inside Stimpy, having suffered from the cruelty of the city's populace during his time free. He hides between two homeless men, who attempt to light him on fire; he hides in the sewers for safety.

It is Christmas, and Ren celebrates the festivity in sorrow and loneliness, only for Stimpy to return, frozen in an ice block. He thaws Stimpy out near the fire, only for Stinky to visit; he returns to his joyous self, but refuses to let Stinky have his own life until he shows up with his girlfriend, an apparently sentient fish corpse. Stimpy oversees their marriage, finally able to accept Stinky's manhood. The couple move to a corner in the residence; Ren returns to his usual disgruntled self while Stimpy celebrates the happy ending, a rare occurrence on the series.

== Cast ==
- Billy West as Ren, Stimpy, and Stinky
- Harris Peet as the gum creatures

== Production ==
The episode's story is credited to John Kricfalusi (the show's creator), Vincent Waller and Richard Pursel; storyboarded by Peter Avanzino; and directed by Kricfalusi himself. He originally conceived "Son of Stimpy" as a parody and critique of classic, popular Hollywood melodramas (such as The Wizard of Oz, Bambi, The Godfather, and E.T. the Extra-Terrestrial), as well as "fake pathos". He describes the latter as an act of manipulation performed by film directors that involves using audio-visual cues and tricks, mainly music and cinematography, to trigger melancholy emotions in audience members.

Kricfalusi, infuriated by this practice, referred to it as "cheap", "contrived", and "a dirty trick", while asserting his belief that real drama should come from engaging characters and believable acting, not from editing techniques. He also vented his frustration that dramatic features of this type ultimately gain more acclaim and recognition than simpler comedic films, which are generally seen as inferior. When writing this episode, he deliberately gave it the most ridiculous premise he could think of (Stimpy not being able to flatulent a second time) and used as many of the aforementioned filmic tricks as he could think of, to prove how easy it is to force viewers into crying over something that has little to no real substance.

=== Censorship ===
John Kricfalusi made this episode as an exchange: if he made heartwarming episodes, Nickelodeon would let him make more gross episodes. The mistletoe scene, in which Ren tries to lure Stimpy inside by the mistletoe, caused much dispute between Kricfalusi and Nickelodeon, who objected to its "homosexual undertones". According to Kricfalusi's commentary on the DVD, Nickelodeon ultimately decided to include the scene after hearing that its removal greatly upset an unidentified homosexual Spümcø artist. A short scene where Ren pushes Stimpy's Christmas present towards a picture of him is cut from the "First and Second Seasons" DVD. However, it is shown on the Sony Wonder VHS release, and it was digitally restored on later airings such as on Nick, MTV, and as recent as Comedy Central and Paramount+. Nickelodeon had originally cut the part where Stimpy goes to the police to find his missing "son", only to be violently thrown out, but it was retained on later releases, beginning with its Spike TV airing and DVD release.

== Reception ==
=== Critical reception ===
Thad Komorowski gave the episode four stars out of five, calling it a memorable Christmas special.

In An Introduction to Film Studies, the episode is used as a case study and comments on the motifs in the episode.

The 'Son of God' motif which underpins the cartoon, signalled in its title and its Christmas setting and soundtrack, allies the sacred and profane in a way that some might find provocative. Kricfalusi does not make this a coherent analogy, however, but self-evidently uses the 'openness' of the animated vocabulary for subversive purposes.

A. J. Carson of tvdvdreviews.com praised the episode as a "pitch-perfect send-up of maudlin Christmas specials".

=== Accolades ===
In 1993, the episode was nominated for the Primetime Emmy Award for Outstanding Animated Program (for Programming Less Than One Hour) at the 45th Primetime Emmy Awards, but lost to the Batman: The Animated Series episode "Robin's Reckoning".

In 2007, the episode was ranked No. 96 in the 100 Greatest Nicktoon Episodes Countdown.
