= Jack Carter (comedian) =

American comedian and actor (1922–2015)

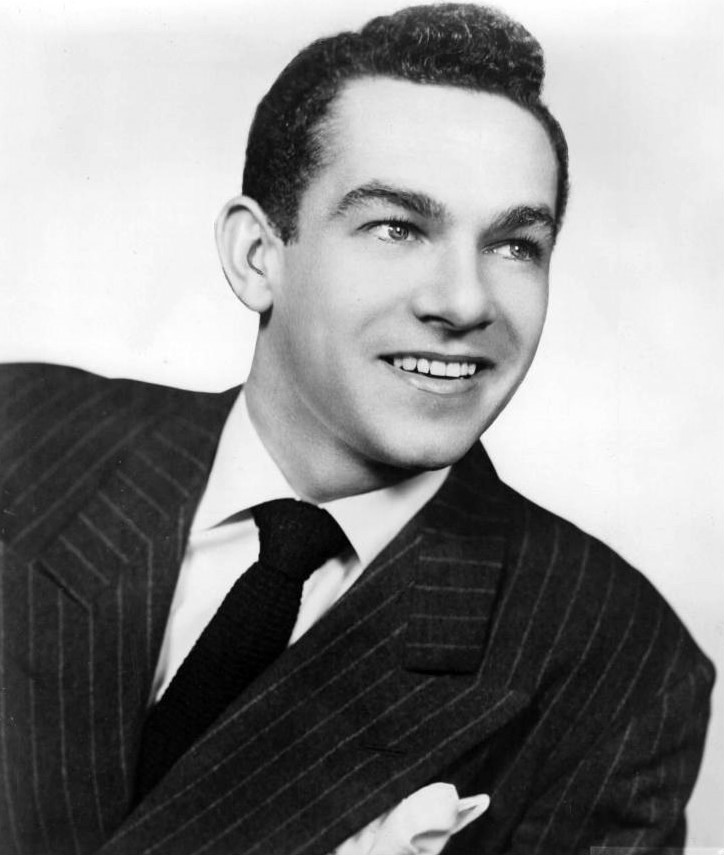
- Carter in 1949
- Born: Jack Chakrin; June 24, 1922; New York City, U.S.
- Died: June 28, 2015 (aged 93); Beverly Hills, California, U.S.
- Occupations: Actor; comedian; television presenter
- Years active: 1940s–2014
- Spouses: Joan Mann (m. 1949; div. 1958) Paula Stewart (m. 1961; div. 1970) Roxanne Wander (m. 1971; div. 1977) (m. 1992–2015)
- Children: 4

Signature
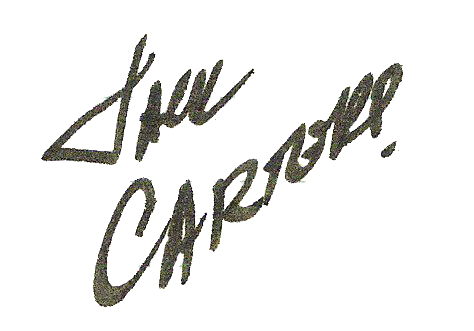

Jack Carter (born Jack Chakrin; June 24, 1922 – June 28, 2015) was an American comedian, actor and television presenter. Born in Brooklyn, Carter had a long-running comedy act similar to fellow rapid-paced contemporaries Milton Berle and Morey Amsterdam.

== Life and career ==
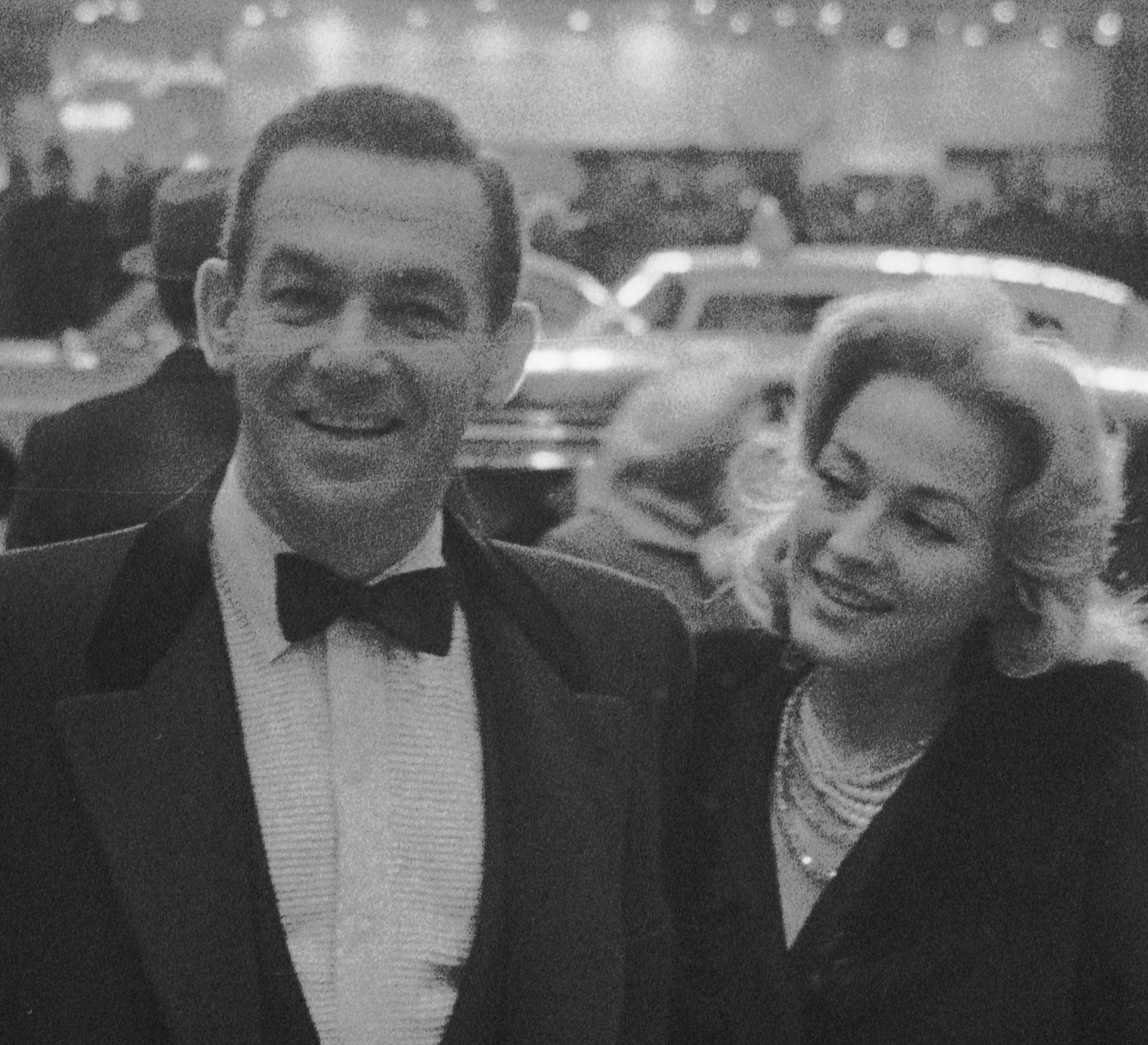
Carter and Paula Stewart in 1959

Carter was born in Brighton Beach, Brooklyn, New York, to Russian Jewish immigrants Anna (née Borofsky) and Harry Chakrin. His parents owned a candy store there where he began to dance on tables at the age of 3.

Carter served in the United States Army Air Forces during World War II. He hosted an early television variety program called Cavalcade of Stars on the DuMont Network. He was lured to NBC to host his own program titled The Jack Carter Show. Carter recommended Jackie Gleason take his place as host of Cavalcade of Stars, though DuMont did not hire Gleason until the network's choice, Jerry Lester, also jumped to NBC. The Jack Carter Show appeared under the banner of the Saturday Night Revue, NBC's 2 1/2-hour Saturday night programming slot. Carter hosted his show for one hour each week followed by the 90-minute Your Show of Shows starring Sid Caesar, Imogene Coca, Carl Reiner, and Howard Morris. Carter remained friends with Caesar his entire life and delivered the eulogy at his funeral.

His only major Broadway appearance was opposite Sammy Davis Jr. in the 1956 musical Mr. Wonderful. He earlier replaced Phil Silvers in the Broadway show Top Banana. He was a frequent guest on The Ed Sullivan Show during the 1960s and early 1970s, and was known for his impression of Ed Sullivan. He appeared as himself (along with his then-wife Paula Stewart) in the comedy series The Joey Bishop Show. In the late 1960s, he was the host of a game-show pilot called Second Guessers. The pilot did not sell. He was also a frequent panelist on the television game show Match Game during the 1973–1974 season and again during the early 1980s. In 1975, he appeared as a guest star on the quiz show $10,000 Pyramid with contestant Liz Hogan Schultz, and appeared as the ill-fated mayor in the cult horror film Alligator in 1980.

Starting in the 1970s, Carter was on more than ten Dean Martin Celebrity Roasts for some popular television stars and sports personalities. In 1981, Carter starred as Fagin in the stage performance of Oliver! at the Birmingham Theater in Birmingham, Michigan alongside Shani Wallis as Nancy.

He made appearances on many television series, including Diagnosis: Unknown, The Dick Van Dyke Show, I Dream of Jeannie, Combat!, The Love Boat, Mr. Smith Goes to Washington, The Rockford Files, Emergency!, Mannix, Cannon, The Wild Wild West, Tales of Tomorrow, The Kallikaks, Password, $weepstake$, The Ren & Stimpy Show, 7th Heaven, Diagnosis Murder, The Road West, Sanford and Son, Tattletales, Monk, Rules of Engagement, Living Single, iCarly, Desperate Housewives, and Shameless and voice work on King of the Hill. He was a guest on Norm Macdonald's video podcast, Norm Macdonald Live, in 2014.

In 1994, Carter was offered the role of Wilbur Cobb in The Ren & Stimpy Show, a character intended to be named Raymond Spum, but was renamed after John Kricfalusi was fired. Showrunner Bob Camp felt sorry for Carter's lack of work, so he shoehorned the character in episodes at every opportunity he could, to the detriment of the show and criticism by crew members such as William Wray.

== Death ==
Carter died on June 28, 2015 at his home in Beverly Hills, California, of respiratory failure.

== Filmography ==
=== Film ===
| Year | Title | Role | Notes |
|---|---|---|---|
| 1959 | It Happened to Jane | Stenographer | Uncredited |
| 1962 | The Horizontal Lieutenant | Lieutenant Billy Monk | |
| 1964 | Viva Las Vegas | Casino Performer | Uncredited |
| 1969 | The Extraordinary Seaman | Orville Toole | |
| 1971 | The Resurrection of Zachary Wheeler | Dwight Chiles | |
| 1975 | Hustle | Herbie Dalitz | |
| 1976 | Won Ton Ton, the Dog Who Saved Hollywood | Male Journalist | |
| 1976 | The Amazing Dobermans | Solly Kramer | |
| 1977 | The Happy Hooker Goes to Washington | Senator Caruso | |
| 1978 | Record City | Manny | |
| 1979 | The Glove | Walter Stratton | |
| 1980 | Alligator | Mayor | |
| 1980 | The Octagon | Sharkey | |
| 1981 | Separate Ways | Barney Brodsky | |
| 1981 | History of the World, Part I | Rat Vendor | |
| 1981 | Heartbeeps | Catskil-55602 | Voice |
| 1983 | The Funny Farm | Philly Beekman | |
| 1984 | Hambone and Hillie | Lester Burns | |
| 1984 | Love Scenes | Sidney | |
| 1986 | The Trouble with Dick | Samsa | |
| 1987 | W.A.R.: Women Against Rape | Frank Bower | |
| 1989 | Arena | Announcer | |
| 1990 | Satan's Princess | Old Priest | |
| 1990 | Cyber-C.H.I.C. | Dr. Burburagmus | |
| 1990 | Caged Fury | Mr. Castaglia | |
| 1990 | Sexpot | Cal Farnsworth | |
| 1992 | In the Heat of Passion | Stan | |
| 1992 | The Opposite Sex and How to Live with Them | Rabbi | |
| 1995 | Prima Donnas | Senator Robertson | |
| 1997 | The Good Bad Guy | Honda Civic Driver | |
| 1997 | Always Say Goodbye | Jerry Feldman | |
| 1998 | October 22 | Pawnbroker | |
| 1998 | The Modern Adventures of Tom Sawyer | Young Guy | |
| 1999 | Play It to the Bone | Dante Solomon | |
| 2004 | One Last Ride | Sid | |
| 2007 | Cougar Club | Party Guest, Stan's Friend | |
| 2008 | The Great Buck Howard | Himself | |
| 2011 | Let Go | Frosty | |
| 2014 | Mercy | Mr. Bello | Final role |

=== Television ===
| Year | Title | Role | Notes |
|---|---|---|---|
| 1962 | Alfred Hitchcock Presents | Stanley Towers | Episode: "Most Likely to Succeed" |
| 1964 | The Dick Van Dyke Show | Neil Schenk | Episode: "Stretch Petrie vs. Kid Schenk" |
| 1968 | I Dream of Jeannie | James Ashley | Episode: "My Master, the Ghostbreaker" 1969 Wild Wild West "Night of the Janus" Season 4 Episode 18 source - IMDB |
| 1973 | Hawaii Five-O | Harry Foxton | Episode:"Try to Die on Time" |
| 1977 | The Rockford Files | Marty Golden | Episode: "The Becker Connection" |
| 1977 | Sanford and Son | Marvin | Episode: "Fred Meets Redd" |
| 1993 | Lois & Clark: The New Adventures of Superman | Murray Brown | Episode: "I'm Looking Through You" |
| 1994 | Burke's Law | Danny Duke | Episode: "Who Killed the Host at the Roast?" |
| 1994–1996 | The Ren & Stimpy Show | Wilbur Cobb (voice) | 9 episodes |
| 1995 | Duckman | Checky Borscht (voice) | Episode: "Research and Destroy" |
| 1996 | Saved by the Bell: The New Class | Larry Madison | Episode: "The Final Curtain" |
| 1996 | Living Single | Ray Kellum | 2 episodes |
| 1997 | Superman: The Animated Series | Harry (voice) | Episode: "Warrior Queen" |
| 1998 | Hercules | Tiresias (voice) | Episode: "Hercules and the Griffin" |
| 1999 | 3rd Rock from the Sun | Uncle Abe | Episode: "Dick Solomon of the Indiana Solomons" |
| 1999 | Pinky, Elmyra & the Brain | Ziff Twyman (voice) | Episode: "That's Edutainment!" |
| 2001 | King of the Hill | Irwin Linker (voice) | 2 episodes |
| 2002 | Static Shock | Frieda's Grandfather (voice) | Episode: "Frozen Out" |
| 2004 | Justice League Unlimited | Sid (voice) | Episode: "This Little Piggy" |
| 2005 | Phil of the Future | Older Nathan | Episode: "Maybe-Sitting" |
| 2008 | Monk | Joseph Moody | Episode: "Mr. Monk Buys a House" |
| 2009 | Parks and Recreation | Old Gus | Episode: "Ron and Tammy" |
| 2010 | iCarly | Gilbert Gibson | 2 episodes |
| 2011 | Family Guy | Old Man (voice) | Episode: "Grumpy Old Man" |
| 2012–2014 | Shameless | Stan Kopchek | 4 episodes |
| 2012 | New Girl | Burt | Episode: "Backslide" |
| 2013 | Go On | Sarge | Episode: "Urn-ed Run" |

=== Video games ===
| Year | Title | Role | Notes |
|---|---|---|---|
| 2001 | Jak and Daxter: The Precursor Legacy | Uncle | |
