= Man's Best Friend (The Ren & Stimpy Show) =

- The Ren & Stimpy Show episode
- Episode no.: Season 2 Episode 2b
- Directed by: John Kricfalusi
- Story by: Vincent Waller; John Kricfalusi
- Original air date: June 23, 2003 (Spike TV)

Episode chronology
← Previous "Ren's Toothache"	Next → "Out West"

"Man's Best Friend" is an episode from the second season of the American animated television series The Ren & Stimpy Show. It was originally intended to air on Nickelodeon on August 22, 1992, as the second half of the second episode of Season 2, but was pulled before airing and replaced by a censored version of "Big House Blues". It eventually aired on the soft launch of Spike TV on June 23, 2003. In the episode, Ren and Stimpy (voiced by John Kricfalusi and Billy West, respectively) learn about obedience after George Liquor (voiced by Michael Pataki) takes them home with him and swears to make them "champions".

The episode was deemed controversial for the violent scene where Ren beats George with an oar on-screen, along with tobacco references and a joke about feces, and Nickelodeon refused to carry it in its original form, terminating series creator John Kricfalusi and his production company Spümcø from further involvement in the series at the time.

== Plot ==
One day, George Liquor is standing outside of a pet store, watching Ren and Stimpy sleep in the window, and gets the idea to adopt them as his pets. Despite the warning on the glass, George bangs on the glass, waking up the duo and frightening them. Upon arriving home, he empties a fish bowl containing a goldfish and forces the duo to live in it. The goldfish flops out the door and leaves in George's car.

The next day, Ren and Stimpy awaken to find George dressed as a drill instructor to train them to be proper pets. Their first lesson is house training by doing push-ups using their buttocks on a newspaper. Ren fails, but Stimpy succeeds while reading the newspaper. He is given a cigar-shaped dog treat resembling feces as a reward, after which he dances for joy.

George then teaches them to disobey, in order to learn discipline. He tells them not to go near the couch, then instructs them to do so in order to be punished. When he begins to become enraged by them not following his orders, Ren collapses to the floor sobbing, and a terrified Stimpy jumps onto the couch as George had instructed, only to be yelled at. Stimpy becomes scared, thinking he is going to be punished. Instead, George compliments him for following orders and gives him another dog treat. George then instructs Ren to ask him for punishment. After Ren does so, George insists that Ren is too "soft" for punishment and instead humiliates him by giving him 20 dollars and allows him to entertain himself with the money; this distresses the normally money-loving Ren. Ren snidely points out that the fish already took the car, which appears to enrage George. Instead, he gives Ren another 20 dollars for backtalking him.

Lastly, George teaches them to protect their "master". Before they learn to defend, they are taught to attack. Wearing a padded suit, he urges the two of them to attack him. Stimpy refuses because George had treated him relatively well, but Ren, who is sick of George and his apparent ill-treatment, picks up an oar and maniacally begins beating him up with it, much to Stimpy's horror. Believing himself to have killed George, Ren is satisfied by his actions, only for George to emerge relatively unharmed (his padded suit had absorbed most of the damage). Ren becomes frightened by George's apparent anger, only for him to express being impressed by Ren's performance. The episode ends with the three of them dancing with the cigar-shaped treats clamped between their teeth.

== Cast ==
- John Kricfalusi as Ren
- Billy West as Stimpy
- Harris Peet as the Goldfish
- Michael Pataki as George Liquor

== Production ==
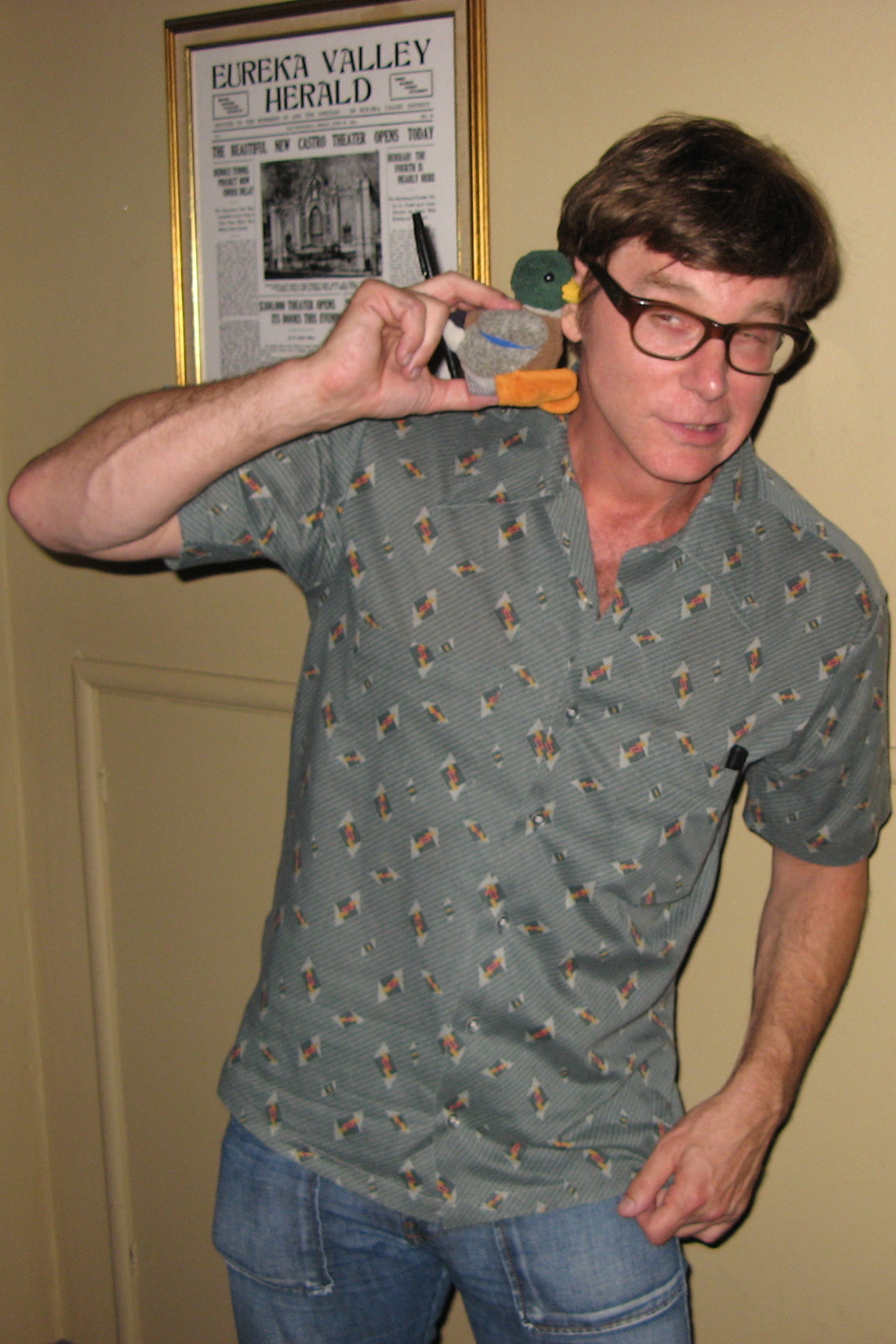
John Kricfalusi (pictured; 2006) co-wrote and directed the episode, and had voiced Ren Hoek until the end of this season. This episode was the cause of his termination from Nickelodeon due to his toxic behavior.

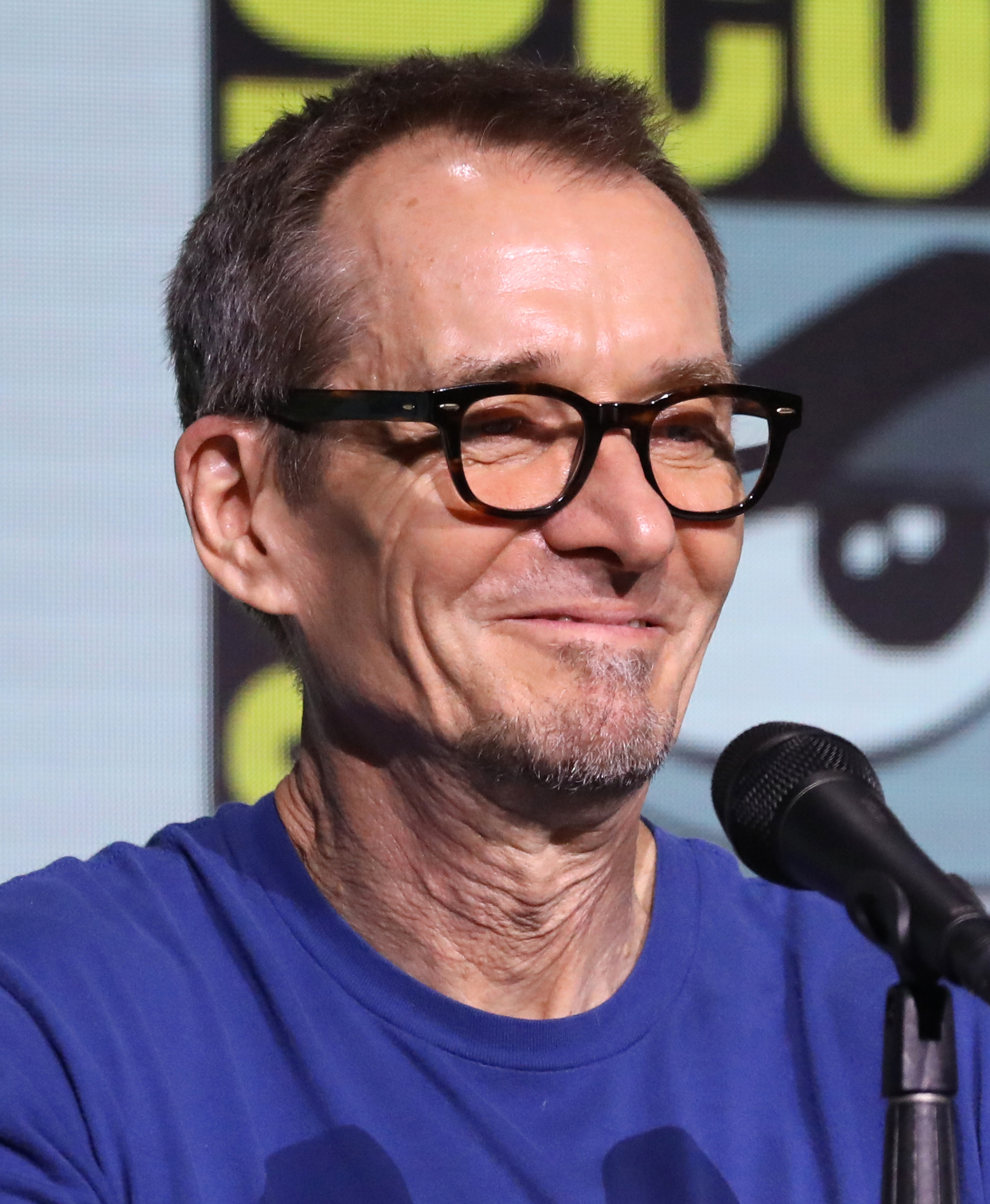
Vincent Waller (pictured; 2024) co-wrote the episode. As Kricfalusi was let go, his Spümcø team had left along with, including Waller himself.

Produced for the show's second season, the story for the episode was written by storyboard artist Vincent Waller, who would later go on to work on another Nickelodeon animated series SpongeBob SquarePants, and series creator John Kricfalusi, who also served as the episode's director, with storyboards provided by Chris Reccardi, who would later work on storyboards for such shows as The Powerpuff Girls and Samurai Jack. Carbunkle Cartoons provided animation for the episode, with the studio's founder Bob Jaques as its animation director. This is the first episode where George Liquor is voiced by Michael Pataki. Previously, he was portrayed by Harris Peet, although Peet would provide a brief voice of the goldfish in one scene where he would pull out of the driveway with Liquor's car. This episode was meant to be a predecessor to the episode "Dog Show", as George had apparently trained the duo by that point. Originally, a scene where George Liquor leg-wrestles with Ren and Stimpy was going to be in this episode, but never got past the storyboards.

Production was greatly troubled; animators at Carbunkle were worked to their limits trying to replicate Kricfalusi's layouts, with his dissatisfaction causing numerous delays in production. Kricfalusi fired his protégé Michael Kim for failing to submit his layouts for this same reason. After the contract with Spümcø was terminated, Games Animation eventually produced the scene using archive audio and Rough Draft Korea's animation services. As the show transitioned to the Nickelodeon network, production slowed dramatically. Nickelodeon fired Kricfalusi, claiming he was the reason the episodes were airing much later than expected. Kim and some of the Spümcø would later quickly get hired by Warner Bros. Animation to return to work on Batman: The Animated Series as a result, before they came back to work at Games. The terms of the legal settlement between Nickelodeon and Kricfalusi meant that Nickelodeon was unable to ever air the footage, as Kricfalusi had received the rights to George Liquor as part of the settlement.

== Controversy ==
The episode was scheduled to air on Nickelodeon for an airdate of August 22, 1992, but executives for the channel resisted due to one violent scene near the end in which Ren beats up George with an oar, as well as the way George yelled at Stimpy, or that the dog treats were drawn to resemble cigars and feces. Following the episode's ban, Nickelodeon fired John Kricfalusi and a number of employees at Spümcø. Kricfalusi believed this was done in order to make the show appropriate for younger viewers, while Nickelodeon stated that the primary reason was Kricfalusi missing deadlines. Following this, Games Animation handled the show starting with its third season, with Billy West, Stimpy's voice actor, replacing Kricfalusi's role as the voice of Ren, as he had intended to do so before Kricfalusi insisted on voicing Ren. This controversy had also attracted attention to the inconsistency of Nickelodeon's censorship; while a dog treat resembling feces was met with scrutiny, a bloody intestine passing out feces in the episode "The Royal Canadian Kilted Yaksmen" was not. Games Animation was allowed to include risqué content, even occasional graphic violence or a few instances of things that resemble blood in the later episodes, despite the previously mentioned oar scene not featuring any blood.

Years later, in 2002, Kricfalusi was hired by Viacom's own TNN to produce the short-lived Ren & Stimpy "Adult Party Cartoon", the "extreme" version and the adult-oriented spin-off of the original series, for their animation block. The episode aired on June 23, 2003, along with the uncut version of the original Ren & Stimpy pilot "Big House Blues", three days before the premiere of Adult Party Cartoon, which would air on the network that would eventually be renamed as Spike TV with a rating of TV-MA. The episode was also released on Ren & Stimpy's first and second season DVD boxset as a bonus feature.

== Reception ==
American journalist Thad Komorowski praised the episode, calling it one of the best episodes of the entire series, awarding it a perfect five out of five stars.

== Sources ==
- Komorowski, Thad (2017). Sick Little Monkeys: The Unauthorized Ren & Stimpy Story. BearManor Media.
