= List of The Grim Adventures of Billy & Mandy episodes =

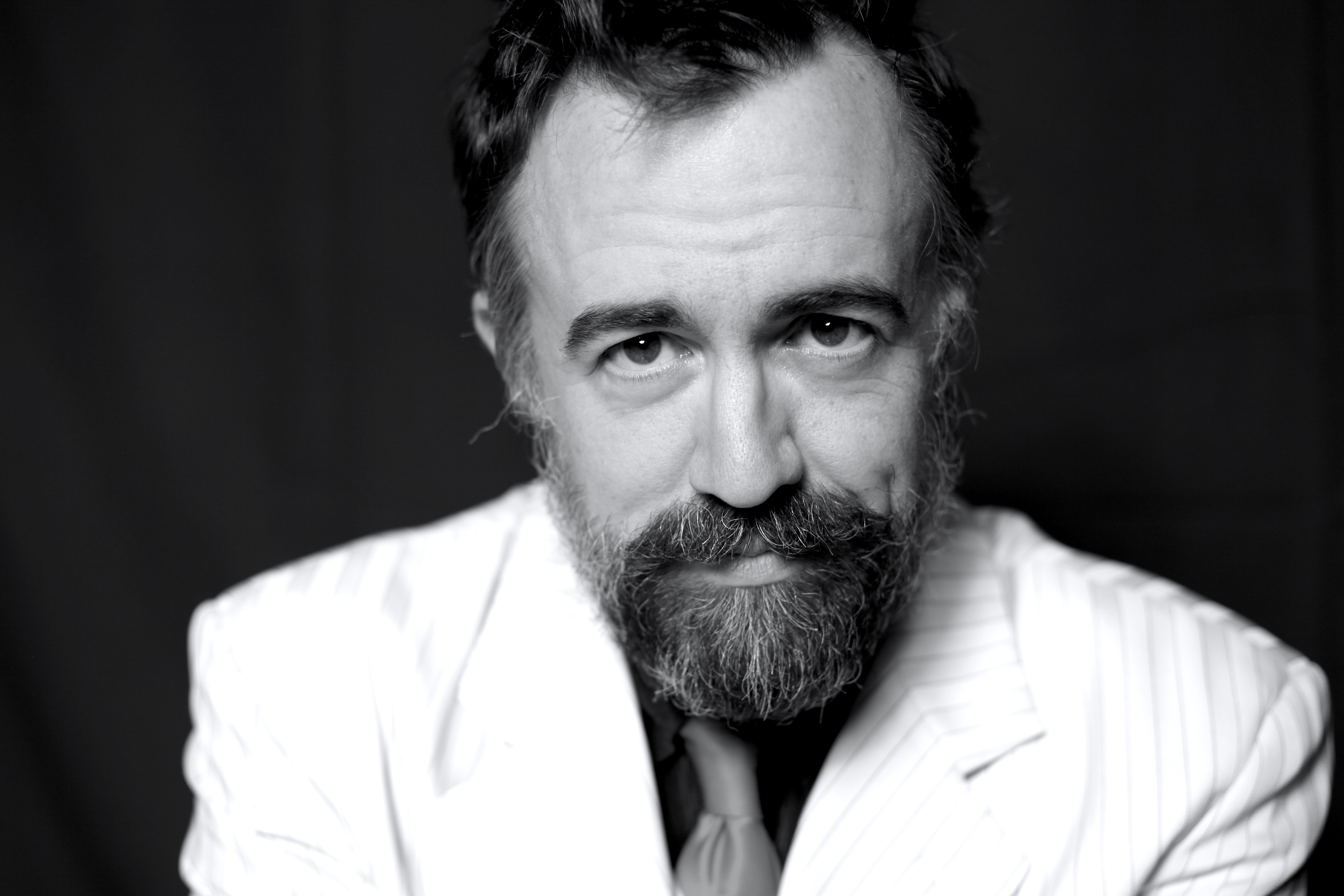
Maxwell Atoms originally conceived The Grim Adventures of Billy & Mandy for Cartoon Network as a pilot short for the channel's Big Pick event. It first aired as part of the combination series Grim & Evil in 2001.

The Grim Adventures of Billy & Mandy is an American animated television series created by Maxwell Atoms for Cartoon Network. The series originally premiered as segments of Grim & Evil on August 24, 2001. The segments were spun-out into their own series on June 13, 2003, and continued to air until November 9, 2007. A spin-off film, titled Underfist: Halloween Bash, aired on October 12, 2008.

A total of 78 half-hour episodes were produced, including four specials and three feature-length TV films, bringing the total number of episodes to 84, in the form of 160 segments. The episode "Billy & Mandy Moon the Moon" was part of Cartoon Network's "Invaded" event, which included other shows such Foster's Home for Imaginary Friends, Ed, Edd n Eddy, My Gym Partner's a Monkey, and Camp Lazlo, with Billy & Mandy being the last to air.

== Series overview ==
Note: Most of the episodes did not air in production code order.

Season	Episodes	Series	Originally released	
Season	Episodes	Series	First released	Last released
1	13	Grim & Evil (episodes 1–8 except "Battle of the Bands"); The Grim Adventures of Billy & Mandy ("Battle of the Bands" and episodes 9–13)	August 24, 2001	August 1, 2003
2	13	The Grim Adventures of Billy & Mandy	July 18, 2003	October 22, 2004
3	13	The Grim Adventures of Billy & Mandy	October 1, 2004	June 17, 2005
4	13	The Grim Adventures of Billy & Mandy	June 24, 2005	October 21, 2005
5	13	The Grim Adventures of Billy & Mandy	January 6, 2006	August 9, 2006
6	13	The Grim Adventures of Billy & Mandy	October 6, 2006	November 9, 2007

== Episodes ==
Episodes are listed in accordance with their order on the Season 1 DVD and Amazon Prime streaming service.

=== Season 1 (2001–03) ===
All of these episodes were originally produced for Grim & Evil, and the first eight aired as part of Grim & Evil in both the U.S. (except for "Battle of the Bands") and UK. The latter five and "Battle of the Bands" aired as part of the standalone Grim Adventures of Billy & Mandy in the U.S.

No.	Title	Directed by	Story by	Storyboarded by	Original release date	Prod. code
1a	"Meet the Reaper"	Maxwell Atoms	Written by : Maxwell Atoms	TBA	June 9, 2000 (pilot); August 24, 2001	TBA
1b	"Skeletons in the Water Closet"	Dave Brain	Written by : Greg Miller	Greg Miller	August 24, 2001	TBA
1c	"Opposite Day"	Dave Brain	Written by : Maxwell Atoms	Mike Stern	August 31, 2001	TBA
2a	"Get Out of My Head!"	Dave Brain	Written by : Maxwell Atoms	Maxwell Atoms	September 7, 2001	TBA
2b	"Look Alive!"	Brian Hogan	Written by : Maxwell Atoms	Paul McEvoy	August 31, 2001	TBA
2c	"Mortal Dilemma"	Brian Hogan	Written by : Amy Rogers	Michael Diederich	September 7, 2001	TBA
3a	"Fiend is Like Friend Without the 'R'"	Brian Hogan	Written by : Craig Lewis	Paul McEvoy	December 14, 2001	TBA
3b	"Recipe for Disaster"	Dave Brain	Written by : Maxwell Atoms	Mike Diederich	October 5, 2001	TBA
3c	"A Dumb Wish"	Brian Hogan	Written by : Paul McEvoy	Paul McEvoy	October 12, 2001	TBA
4a	"Grim or Gregory?"	Brian Hogan	Gord Zajac	Shellie Kvilvang	July 26, 2002	TBA
4b	"Grim vs. Mom"	Brian Hogan	Gord Zajac	Alex Almaguer	July 19, 2002	TBA
4c	"Tastes Like Chicken"	Brian Hogan and John McIntyre	Gord Zajac	Mike Diederich	July 19, 2002	TBA
5a	"Something Stupid This Way Comes"	John McIntyre and Robert Alvarez	Craig Lewis	Maxwell Atoms	July 26, 2002	TBA
5b	"A Grim Surprise"	John McIntyre and Robert Alvarez	Rob DeSales	John McIntyre	August 2, 2002	TBA
5c	"Beasts & Barbarians"	Dave Brain	Gord Zajac	Michael Diederich	August 2, 2002	TBA
6a	"Billy's Growth Spurt"	Brian Hogan	Gord Zajac	Michael Diederich	October 4, 2002	TBA
6b	"Hoss Delgado: Spectral Exterminator"	Brian Hogan	Gord Zajac	Brian Kindregan	August 9, 2002	TBA
6c	"Tickle Me Mandy"	Brian Hogan	Gord Zajac	Mucci Fassett	October 11, 2002	TBA
7a	"Billy & The Bully"	John McIntyre and Robert Alvarez	Gord Zajac	Brett Varon	October 4, 2002	TBA
7b	"To Eris Human"	Dave Brain	Gord Zajac	Chris Savino	August 9, 2002	TBA
7c	"Big Trouble in Billy's Basement"	Robert Alvarez and John McIntyre	Gord Zajac	Chris McCulloch	October 11, 2002	TBA
8a	"Battle of the Bands"	Robert Alvarez	Craig Lewis	Brett Varon	August 1, 2003	TBA
8b	"Little Rock of Horrors"	Robert Alvarez	Gord Zajac	Maxwell Atoms	October 18, 2002	TBA
8c	"Dream a Little Dream"	Dave Brain	Gord Zajac	Michael Diederich	October 18, 2002	TBA
9a	"Toadblatt's School of Sorcery"	Robert Alvarez	Ben Spergel	Mike Diederich and Maxwell Atoms	June 13, 2003	TBA
9b	"Educating Grim"	Juli Hashiguchi	Rachael MacFarlane	Brett Varon	June 13, 2003	TBA
9c	"It's Hokey Mon!"	John McIntyre and Robert Alvarez	Gord Zajac	Mike Diederich	June 13, 2003	TBA
10a	"Night of the Living Grim"	Juli Hashiguchi	Gord Zajac	Spencer Laudiero	June 20, 2003	TBA
10b–10c	"Brown Evil"	Robert Alvarez	Gord Zajac	Paul McEvoy	June 20, 2003	TBA
10b–10c	"Brown Evil"	Pat Shinagawa	Gord Zajac	Paul McEvoy	June 20, 2003	TBA
11a	"Mandy, the Merciless"	Pat Shinagawa	Gord Zajac	Alex Almaguer	June 27, 2003	TBA
11b	"Creating Chaos"	Pat Shinagawa	Gord Zajac	Brett Varon	June 27, 2003	TBA
11c	"The Really Odd Couple"	John McIntyre and Randy Myers	Gord Zajac	Mucci Fassett	June 27, 2003	TBA
12a	"Who Killed Who?"	Pat Shinagawa, John McIntyre, and Randy Myers	Gord Zajac	Paul McEvoy	July 4, 2003	TBA
12b	"Tween Wolf"	Pat Shinagawa	Gord Zajac	Mucci Fassett	July 4, 2003	TBA
13a	"Grim in Love"	John McIntyre and Robert Alvarez	Gord Zajac	Brett Varon	July 11, 2003	TBA
13b	"Crushed"	John McIntyre and Robert Alvarez	Gord Zajac	Brett Varon	July 11, 2003	TBA
13c	"Love is "Evol" Spelled Backwards"	Juli Hashiguchi	Craig Lewis	Paul McEvoy	July 11, 2003	TBA

=== Season 2 (2003–04) ===
The first five of these episodes were originally produced for Grim & Evil. These five aired as part of Grim & Evil in the UK, but in the U.S. they aired as part of the standalone Grim Adventures Billy & Mandy.

No. overall	No. in season	Title	Directed by	Story by	Storyboarded by	Original release date	Prod. code
14a	1a	"The Crawling Niceness"	John McIntyre and Robert Alvarez	Maxwell Atoms	Maxwell Atoms	July 18, 2003	TBA
Billy takes a big egg found in Grim's trunk and hatches it expecting a duck. Instead, Jeff the Spider is born, who considers Billy his father. Despite Jeff trying to please Billy in any possible way, Billy is terrified of Jeff and wants him squished. The exterminator chose not to squish Jeff because he is a nice bug.
14b	1b	"Smarten Up!"	John McIntyre and Robert Alvarez	Gord Zajac	David Feiss	July 18, 2003	TBA
Billy is worried about failing an upcoming Math test, so Grim gives him a "bookworm", which will make him much smarter. Milkshakes, Billy's cat, eats the worm instead, and is forced to tutor Billy, but finds him to be unteachable. Eventually, the worm passes through Milkshakes and he returns to normal, but then Mandy's dog Saliva eats it and becomes smart as well.
14c	1c	"The Grim Show"	John McIntyre and Robert Alvarez	Craig Lewis	Trevor Wall	July 18, 2003	TBA
Grim is upset after his favorite show, Atrocia's Late Night Atrocities, is cancelled. He goes to the TV station and using his powers, turns the studio into a creepier place and becomes the host of The Grim Show. Grim's success on TV is interrupted when Mandy tells him he has neglected to do her chores. Billy and Mandy go to the TV station and show embarrassing footage of Grim at home.
15a	2a	"Son of Nergal"	Robert Alvarez	Gord Zajac	Paul McEvoy	July 25, 2003	TBA
Billy and Mandy are sent to "Winter Camp", where they meet Nergal's son, Nergal Jr. Just like his father, Junior tries making friends, although not in the best way possible. Junior attacks the campers, freezes them and, using his shape-shifting abilities, takes over their appearances. Billy decides to be Junior's friend, but he is scared away at the moment Junior shows him his true form.
15b	2b	"Sister Grim"	John McIntyre and Juli Hashiguchi	Gord Zajac	Brett Varon	July 25, 2003	TBA
After being accidentally hit by Billy, Grim lands in a can of white paint in a remote convent. Due to his appearance, still with the can in his head, Grim is mistaken for "Sister Big Mamma" by little cherubic nuns. Grim has a great time with the friendly nuns, until Billy and Mandy come looking for him. When the nuns realize the truth about Grim they get angry at him, but also help him go back home by sending him flying away with another punch.
15c	2c	"Go-Kart 3000!"	John McIntyre and Randy Myers	Gord Zajac	Michael Diederich	July 25, 2003	TBA
When Billy and Irwin exclude Mandy and Grim from helping them build a go-kart to enter the Annual Endsville Go-Kart Competition, the latter two decide to build their own. Billy-Irwin, and Mandy-Grim compete against Mindy, Sperg, and a mystery racer (Pud'n). Mindy gets stuck in highway traffic, Billy-Irwin's car is destroyed, Sperg and Grim mutually prevent each other from winning, and Pud'n wins in his little red wagon.
16a	3a	"Five O' Clock Shadows"	Juli Hashiguchi	Brett Varon	Brett Varon	October 22, 2004	TBA
Grim is annoyed by Billy who thinks that a shadow is following him. Grim takes Billy and Mandy to the Shadows' World, where their opposites live. Grim tells them to do whatever they want, but to be back at 5 o'clock, when the portal to the normal world opens. Grim also warns Billy about the Door to Other Dimensions, but Billy opens it and a multitude of Billies come out and wreak havoc.
16b	3b	"Terror of the Black Knight"	Juli Hashiguchi	Craig Lewis	Alex Almaguer	August 1, 2003	TBA
After being impressed by Irwin's realistic armor at the medieval fair, Billy wishes for a fancy armor too. Grim gives him the "Cursed Suit of the Black Knight". When Billy needs to go to the bathroom, the curse is revealed to be that the armor cannot be taken off until the person wearing it beats someone in a competition. Billy desperately tries to defeat other people at various contests, but fails to come out victorious. He defeats Mandy at a breakdance contest in which Mandy decided not to participate, but he does not need to go to the bathroom anymore.
17a	4a	"Grim for a Day"	Robert Alvarez	Craig Lewis	Paul McEvoy	August 15, 2003	TBA
After a lousy night for Grim, Billy and Grim argue about who has the hardest time, the kid or the Reaper of the Souls. Mandy shouted at Grim and Billy to "SHUT UP!" first, but then she proposes they switch places for the day to find out. Grim seems to be having a good time, acting like a silly kid, while Billy is bored waiting for his old victim, Mr. Voorhees, to open the door. Billy transforms into a short skeleton, while Grim transforms into a taller version of Billy.
17b	4b	"Chicken Ball Z"	Juli Hashiguchi	Ben Spergel	Matt Sullivan	August 15, 2003	TBA
Grim's refusal to help Mandy win a karate tournament and the $50,000 prize it promises to the winner leads her to a curiosity shop, where the shopkeeper, Kuan Ti, gives her an ancient "Chicken Ball" which, when eaten, allows her to become a great fighter. Mandy easily wins the tournament and does not care about the money anymore, only about fighting. It turns out Kuan Ti is actually Eris in disguise, and this was just another of her schemes to create chaos. Seeing how Grim has a chance to get rid of the kids and finally be free, he tries to take advantage of this by making Billy a superb fighter too, so he and Mandy can fight ferociously to the death until the entire arena is destroyed. With both still alive, Mandy still demands the prize money, which she uses to buy Hector Con Carne's Bunny Island (from Evil Con Carne).
17c	4c	"The Halls of Time"	John McIntyre and Randy Myers	Gord Zajac	Mike Diederich	August 1, 2003	TBA
After missing a school trip, Grim takes Billy, Mandy, and Irwin to the "Halls of Time" for a tour. There, Billy and Irwin mess with the hourglasses that symbolize each person's lifespan. When they leave, they accidentally leave their own hourglasses, including Grim's, upside down, resulting in the group getting younger as time passes. Grim allows the kids to disappear by going before birth, but he cannot restore his own hourglass to its correct position and he disappears too. Note: When this episode is paired with "Terror of the Black Knight" and "Battle of the Bands" on its first airing as well as subsequent airings, Evil Con Carne's "Max Courage!" would be airing in its place between "Grim for a Day" and "Chicken Ball Z".
18	5	"Billy & Mandy's Jacked-Up Halloween"	Juli Hashiguchi and Robert Alvarez	Maxwell Atoms, Brett Varon, and Paul McEvoy	Brett Varon and Maxwell Atoms	October 1, 2003	TBA
While trick-or-treating, Grim tells Billy and Mandy the story of why people pull pranks, which he was partially responsible for. He tells about Jack (voiced by Wayne Knight), a prankster of the old Endsville who just never knew when to stop, and stole Grim's scythe. Grim made a deal with Jack giving him eternal life in exchange for the scythe, but also cut off Jack's head so that no one will ever see his face again. Afterwards, Jack decided to use a pumpkin for a head, becoming Jack O'Lantern; every Halloween he goes out to pull pranks on the citizens of Endsville, and waits 364 more days a year until next Halloween in a solitary mode in his own house. After hearing the story, Billy splits from the group and finds Jack's house downtown. Jack realizes Billy is carrying the actual Reaper's scythe, so he takes it from him and uses it to open the gates of the Underworld and bring forth ghosts, which cause havoc in the city. Jack then plans to get revenge on Grim by cutting his head off which, being cut with the Reaper's scythe, will stay off "forever". To stop Jack from carrying on with his vengeance, Mandy sets up a series of pranks for him. The pranks affect Irwin instead, causing major laughter from Jack and his ghouls, which explode and return to the Underworld. Grim recovers his scythe and sends Jack to the Underworld too.
19a	6a	"Spider's Little Daddy"	Robert Alvarez	Maxwell Atoms	Spencer Laudiero	June 11, 2004	TBA
At a father-and-son picnic, Billy re-encounters with his spider "son", Jeff, in a dirty bathroom. Once again, Jeff tries to make Billy love him as a true father does, but Billy remains terrified of all bugs. Mandy tells Jeff he is being too nice, and to get Billy's attention he needs to be meaner. After being coached by Mandy, Jeff finally snaps and ensnares Billy in his spider web, forcing Billy to say he loves him. The episode ends with Mandy giving Jeff a thumbs-up, approving of Jeff's punishment for Billy, and Jeff gives a thumbs-up to the camera.
19b	6b	"Tricycle of Terror"	Brian Sheesley	Gord Zajac	Carl Greenblatt	June 11, 2004	TBA
When Billy crashes his bicycle, he obtains a free tricycle from a mysterious boy in a supernatural porta-potty. While Billy loves his tricycle, which he calls Trykie, he is also mocked because of it by Irwin, Pud'n, and Sperg. Trykie moves on its own and attacks the three of them. Mandy realizes the problem with Trykie, and Grim confirms that he is possessed by an evil force. Billy realizes that Trykie is indeed evil as well, and he lets Mandy destroy it once and for all. When destroyed, a ghost in the form of the boy Billy met before comes out and insults Billy, Mandy and Grim. At the end, Billy gets a unicycle.
20a	7a	"Dumb Luck"	Juli Hashiguchi	Maxwell Atoms and Mike Diederich	Mike Diederich	June 18, 2004	TBA
After spilling salt in a restaurant and not throwing salt over his left shoulder, Billy starts having an unusual amount of extremely bad luck. The next day, Grim analyzes Billy and finds out he has a "Catastrophe Snail" attached to his brain, which is causing him the bad luck. After some initial resistance from Billy, Grim manages to remove the snail from his brain. The snail attacks Mandy, but she throws it at the wall where Grim roasts the snail with his scythe before eating it (much to Mandy's disgust). Billy panics that he still has bad luck, but Grim tells Billy that he is just stupid.
20b	7b	"No Body Loves Grim"	Shaun Cashman	Craig Lewis and Celia Weiss	Celia Weiss	June 18, 2004	TBA
Billy, Mandy, and Grim go to the beach where Grim falls asleep and Billy buries him in sand. When they leave, Billy only takes Grim's skull, leaving Grim's body to be found by a rich family that take it with them. With his adoptive family, Grim's body becomes a celebrity and refuses to go back with Billy and Mandy. Eventually, Grim's skeleton is reunited with his skull, but instants later it is shattered by dogs.
21a	8a	"Li'l Porkchop"	Brian Sheesley	Brett Varon	Brett Varon	June 25, 2004	TBA
After he turns down his dad's invitation to go fishing, Billy gets a tiny, weakling, pet fish, which he names Little Porkchop. To make Billy happier, Grim makes the fish grow overnight to become a giant. Billy takes Porkchop to play under the Sun, and never gives him water again. He burns to ashes and is flushed down the toilet. Billy's dad returns form his fishing trip having caught Porkchop, now back to his normal size, but plans to cook him.
21b	8b	"Skarred for Life"	Juli Hashiguchi	Maxwell Atoms and C. H. Greenblatt	C. H. Greenblatt	June 25, 2004	TBA
General Skarr buys a home in Endsville and becomes Billy's neighbor. After Skarr invites Billy into his new house, Billy mentions Grim's scythe to be the most powerful weapon in the entire universe, and Skarr (in a parody of Apt Pupil) tries to battle his desire to be evil again. Eventually, Skarr steals the scythe but Mandy proves to be even scarier than him and takes it back.
22a	9a	"House of Pain"	Shaun Cashman	Maxwell Atoms and Mike Diederich	Mike Diederich	July 2, 2004	TBA
Lord Pain, a fearsome warrior from the Plain of Eternal Suffering, appears in Billy's house looking to serve his master, Grim. Lord Pain is put to clean the bathroom and is confused as to why Billy and Mandy treat Grim the way they do. Eventually, Lord Pain realizes that Mandy is to be his real master, and prepares mashed potatoes for her.
22b	9b	"A Grim Prophecy"	Shaun Cashman	Maxwell Atoms	Maxwell Atoms	July 2, 2004	TBA
In this short, set in the Stone Age, a child version of Grim undertakes his first assignments as the Grim Reaper. When he goes to visit a cave witch, she shows him his terrible future being abused by Billy and Mandy.
22c	9c	"Mandy Bites Dog"	Robert Alvarez	Gord Zajac and Spencer Laudiero	Spencer Laudiero	July 2, 2004	TBA
When Mindy mocks Mandy's dumb and cowardly dog, Saliva, Mandy decides to train her dog to be meaner. After Grim keeps mentioning his own dog, Cerberus, Mandy decides to use Grim's special whistle to call the gigantic, three-headed, fire-breathing hound. Cerberus marries Mindy's chihuahua, Little Delicious, and Saliva snaps against Mindy for a brief moment.
23a	10a	"Nursery Crimes"	Brian Sheesley	Brett Varon	Brett Varon	July 9, 2004	TBA
After Billy eats 19 creme-filled Atomic Frenzy Cakes, he cannot sleep and wants Mandy to read him a bedtime story. Mandy, Billy, and Grim each tell a story. For his story, Grim uses a supernatural storybook from the Underworld, which makes Billy and Mandy enter the book and reprise the tale of Hansel and Gretel. Billy departs from the story and follows Pinocchio, who wants to devour Billy to become a real boy. Mandy saves Billy from Pinocchio, but she and Billy remain trapped in the book as Grim, the storyteller, falls asleep. She tries to get out of the book but fails as she says "Someday, you should all pay".
23b	10b	"My Peeps"	Juli Hashiguchi	Matt Sullivan and Celia Wyss	Celia Wyss	July 9, 2004	TBA
When Billy ruins his eyes by playing too many video games and looking directly into the Sun, Mandy and Grim suggest he see an ophthalmologist. When Billy refuses wearing glasses or having laser surgery, Grim uses his own scythe to zap his eyes. Although Billy has sharp and clean eyesight, he can also see supernatural, vision-like glimpses of the future, specially horrific accidents that occur to his best friends such as Irwin injured while riding a bike, Pud'n getting crushed by an elephant and Mandy's severed head on the table with a pink sheet over it. Grim zaps Billy's eyes multiple times to restore them to normal but ultimately the latter ends up with realistic-looking eyes.
24a	11a	"Nigel Planter and the Chamber Pot of Secrets"	Shaun Cashman	Maxwell Atoms and Mike Diederich	Mike Diederich	July 16, 2004	TBA
When Billy, Mandy, and Grim go playing golf, they encounter boy wizard Nigel Planter again, who is there hiding from the dark wizard Lord Moldybutt. They head back to the School of Sorcery, where they keep on running into Moldybutt, who warns them to stay away from the "Chamber Pot of Secrets" hidden in Dean Toadblatt's office. It is revealed that Lord Moldybutt is actually Toadblatt, who was disguising himself to scare off Planter.
24b	11b	"Circus of Fear"	Brian Sheesley	Gord Zajac and Rich Chidlaw	Rich Chidlaw	July 16, 2004	TBA
When Billy and Mandy are utterly bored, Grim takes them to Underworld's "Circus of Fear". The ringleader, Dr. Fear, notices Billy and Mandy, and tries to recruit them into the circus to attract customers, who would pay to see real, live humans. After they go back home, Dr. Fear kidnaps Billy and Mandy, and Grim has to get them back. During the show, Mandy breaks free and in a strange twist of the story, she reveals that the beastmaster, Clortho, is actually Dr. Fear, who in turn is just an earthworm, leaving Billy confused.
25a	12a	"Bully Boogie"	Juli Hashiguchi	Spencer Laudiero, James Silverman, and Zena Wyss	Spencer Laudiero	July 23, 2004	TBA
After failing to scare a fifteen-year-old, the Boogeyman decides to visit his old middle-school victim, Grim. Grim remembers how Boogie used to be a bully, and demands an apology from him. Boogie disappears to the Underworld, taking Billy with him. Mandy and Grim follow Boogie, and to settle their differences Mandy suggests having a scaring contest, in which whoever can scare a kid the most wins. Boogie's transformation as a werewolf is not enough to scare the kid, but Grim's transformation into a giant, horrific rubber duck is.
25b	12b	"Here Thar Be Dwarves!"	Robert Alvarez	Gord Zajac and C. H. Greenblatt	C. H. Greenblatt	July 23, 2004	TBA
As Billy walks into the woods to have a picnic, Yogi Bear and Boo-Boo Bear come to steal his basket, and he escapes by hiding in a cave. Billy is taken to the mushroom lair of the dwarfs where King Beardbottom tells him the story on how the different races split the food-services industry, after the conference of Rivendell. The king sends Billy to infiltrate the elfs' cookie factory to deactivate their force field, so the dwarves can assault the factory. After a fierce battle (censored out "for younger viewers", by a single clip of a pink koala continuously licking a eucalyptus leaf) and Billy's words, the elves and dwarves decide to work together and split the profits.
26a	13a	"Which Came First?"	Brian Sheesley	Matt Sullivan and Vincent Waller	Vincent Waller	July 30, 2004	TBA
While going to a science museum, Billy and Mandy's school bus breaks down in the middle of the desert. After digging for fossils, Billy, Mandy, and Grim wander around and find an abandoned mine, where Billy is captured by a giant, mutant chicken. When Mandy and Grim go to rescue him, they find an underground laboratory from the days of the Cold War where mutant chickens were created. The mountain makes eruption, the chickens are roasted by lava, and the whole class obtains food so they do not have to resort to cannibalism.
26b	13b	"Substitute Teacher"	Shaun Cashman	Maxwell Atoms and Chris Reccardi	Chris Reccardi	July 30, 2004	TBA
Billy's first cousin from the center of the Earth, Nergal Jr. goes to school for the first time, but he is worried that people may not like him. Soon enough, Junior becomes bullied by Sperg, with Miss Butterbean's allowance. Billy suggests Junior to use his shapeshifting abilities to take on the form of Miss Butterbean, so Junior can help him pass a math test. Junior likes the idea, but he morphs into Miss Butterbean to get revenge on Sperg instead. Sperg is seen living in the center of the Earth as Junior's pet.

=== Season 3 (2004–05) ===
No. overall	No. in season	Title	Directed by	Story by	Storyboarded by	Original release date	Prod. code
27a	1a	"Super Zero"	Phil Cummings and Juli Hashiguchi	Brett Varon	Brett Varon	October 1, 2004	TBA
After watching a TV show starring Captain Space Heifer and his Heifer Farms Brand Yogurt, Billy asks Grim to turn him into a superhero with the powers of squeaking and generating yogurt. With his wish granted, Billy goes to outer space to fight the Evil Empire, visiting a planet that is largely uninhabited save for a small, adorable alien who is smothered in Billy's limitless supply of yogurt. Despite being free of Billy, Grim still has to deal with Billy's equally dumb father, Harold. After Billy fills the planet with yogurt, he returns home to be "normal".
27b	1b	"Sickly Sweet"	Robert Alvarez and Phil Cummings	Maxwell Atoms	Celia Weiss	October 1, 2004	TBA
Trying to get revenge at Mandy for bossing them all the time, Billy and Grim put her in the "Mask of the Beast". Mandy must be nice and friendly while wearing the mask or else she will become a hideous monster. Failing to remove the mask herself, and struggling to be "kind" to Billy and Grim, Mandy gradually turns into the beast. Billy and Grim ask Mandy to smile while she bathes them, but this turns out to be too hard for Mandy. She fully transforms and punishes them instead.
28a	2a	"Bearded Billy"	Brian Sheesley	Gord Zajac and Brian Larsen	Brian Larsen	October 8, 2004	TBA
When Billy sees his father, Harold shaving, he decides having a beard is cool and buys "Hair Raiser Tonique", a hair-growing formula. Grim casts a spell on the tonic to make its effects appear faster, but Billy exaggerates the quantity and grows hair in all over his entire body. Billy is mistaken for the Sasquatch and a reward is offered for his capture. Hoss Delgado also receives the tonic and is captured and exhibited as the Sasquatch, while Mandy collects the reward.
28b	2b	"The Nerve"	Shaun Cashman	Gord Zajac and Jim Schumann	Jim Schumann	October 8, 2004	TBA
After being bullied again by Sperg, Billy asks Grim to shrink him to enter Mandy's head to steal her "nerve". After Billy swallows the raw nerve, a polyp-like organism, Mandy becomes timid and scared of everything while Billy becomes tough and mean. While Billy goes to get revenge at Sperg, Mandy enters Billy's head to recover her nerve. Mandy recovers her tough and cynical attitude without her nerve, which is successfully retrieved from Billy and banished from Endsville. In the end, Sperg is walking away and giving Billy a wedgie all at the same time.
29a	3a	"Test of Time"	Shaun Cashman, Brian Sheesley, and Robert Alvarez	Gord Zajac and Paul McEvoy	Paul McEvoy	October 22, 2004	TBA
When Billy forgets to do his history homework, Grim gives him a universal remote control to alter time and space so he can go back in time and finish his report. Billy and Mandy travel to the American Revolution, to prehistoric times, and even to the future, where they meet an aged Billy who is just finishing the report. After a struggle for the remote, Billy ends up again in the prehistory and the remote breaks. Fast forward into the present, every person on Earth has gained Billy's stupidity, characteristic "dot eyes", and big nose.
29b	3b	"A Kick in the Asgard"	Robert Alvarez, Juli Hashiguchi, and Brian Sheesley	Maxwell Atoms	Vincent Waller	October 22, 2004	TBA
During a thunderstorm, a lightning bolt hits Grim's scythe, transporting Billy to Asgard, land of the Norse gods. Mandy and Grim go searching for him, while a Viking wearing Billy's shirt remains at his house as a substitute. In Asgard, Billy learns about the endless battle in Valhalla, in which if a warrior dies, they are resurrected to continue fighting. Billy is surprisingly good at killing other Vikings, so Mandy and Grim are unable to convince him to return home.
30a	4a	"Attack of the Clowns"	Shaun Cashman and Phil Cummings	Gord Zajac and C. H. Greenblatt	C. H. Greenblatt	October 15, 2004	TBA
After Billy wakes up from another nightmare involving clowns, he is more terrified than ever towards them, so Mandy and Grim try to cure him. Mandy asks Grim to bring to life a clown's head made on paper mache to entertain Billy, but the spell does not seem to work. They dress up as clowns in an attempt to look harmless. After consulting with his imaginary "Inner Frat Boy", Billy changes his feeling from being afraid to being angry at clowns, and attacks them with Grim's scythe. Billy is cured of his fear, but the fake clown attacks and eats them.
30b	4b	"Complete and Utter Chaos!" "Billy Gets Dumber!"	Randy Myers	Spencer Laudiero	Spencer Laudiero	October 15, 2004	TBA
Thinking that the world is chaotic enough as it is, Eris, the goddess of chaos, decides to quit chaos to work at a hamburger restaurant. She entrusts Grim the Apple of Discord to watch over for her, which he seals in his old trunk. The apple frees itself from the chest and goes to Billy. Mandy is attracted by the apple's powers, and after being persuaded by Billy's talking burrito, Billy, Mandy, and Grim battle for control of the apple, which divides into three pieces. The battle results in them being fused into an amorphous mass and, with an evil grin on her face, Eris decides to offer the apple to Irwin too.
31a	5a	"Whatever Happened To Billy Whatishisname?"	Brian Sheesley	Maxwell Atoms and Alex Almaguer	Alex Almaguer	October 29, 2004	TBA
When Billy and Mandy have a brief fight, Billy says he never wants to speak to Mandy again. The next day, Billy is over his grudge, but Mandy has already decided to find a replacement for him. Mandy introduces Bobby, the new "Billy" replacement, who turns out to be a better friend than Billy, even gaining the affection of his parents, but who also wants to take over Billy's life. A jealous Billy uses Grim's scythe to open a portal and send Bobby to another dimension.
31b	5b	"Just the Two of Pus"	Robert Alvarez	Jackie Buscarino and Brian Larsen	Brian Larsen	October 29, 2004	TBA
When a doctor is unable to cure Sperg of his severe case of acne, Sperg goes to see a fortune teller that deals with skin problems. Following a Burmese recipe in her own book, the psychic tells Sperg to get Grim's bones and rub them on his face. Sperg has to tolerate being friends with Billy and Grim to get access to the latter's bones. One of Grim's arms gets into a stew and when Sperg is immersed in it, the mix cures completely his acne, but it also erases his nose and mouth.
32a	6a	"Chocolate Sailor"	Shaun Cashman	Craig Lewis	Mike Diederich	November 5, 2004	TBA
While reading an Underworld comic book, Billy finds an advertisement for "Chocolate Sailors", a delicious chocolate candy which is secretly cursed to enslave the eater. Billy becomes a seller of Chocolate Sailors, but instead of selling them ends up eating them all by himself. The enchanted candies turn him into solid chocolate, and now Billy cannot stop eating himself. Billy, Mandy, and Grim go searching for the Chocolate Sailor to retrieve the antidote before Billy eats himself completely. Instead of eating only the antidote, Billy eats it along with other enchanted chocolates, with his body exploding and covering Grim and Mandy in chocolate. Later, Grim and Mandy are shown watching TV while drinking "Billy" Chocolate shakes.
32b	6b	"The Good, the Bad, & the Toothless"	Juli Hashiguchi	Brett Varon	Brett Varon	November 5, 2004	TBA
When Billy has a loose tooth he cannot wait for the Tooth fairy to appear to give him money. Mandy, who does not believe in the Tooth Fairy, asks Sperg to end Billy's waiting by knocking his tooth off. Sperg's punch leaves Billy unconscious, who has a dream about being in the wild west, where the Tooth Fairy has taken his own tooth. Mandy challenges the Tooth Fairy to a showdown to recover the tooth, and she comes out victorious just as Billy awakens. Billy does find money under his pillow, while the aged Tooth Fairy watches through the window.
33a	7a	"That's My Mummy"	Robert Alvarez	Maxwell Atoms and Alex Almaguer	Alex Almaguer	November 12, 2004	TBA
When Billy hangs out at Irwin's house, he finds a living mummy in the bathroom. Seeing as Irwin gets nervous, and as Billy has never met Irwin's mother, he suspects she is the mummy. To scare him off, Irwin's dad Dick tells Billy he has the "curse of the mummy". Billy is attacked by insects and snakes while he tries to find out the truth about the mummy. Billy, Mandy, and Grim then uncover an underground level of Irwin's family's home, which is styled like an ancient Egyptian tomb. They learn that Irwin's mom is in fact a mummy, and the curse of the mummy is real, but Dick claims that you "learn to live with it."
33b	7b	"Toys Will Be Toys"	Randy Myers	Spencer Laudiero	Spencer Laudiero	November 12, 2004	TBA
Thanks to Mandy, Billy decides to get rid of his "Dinobonoid" action figures thinking he is too old for them. Grim makes the toys come to life, and shrinks Billy to their size so he can have a last adventure with them. The "Jurassic Creeps" become aware of Grim's scythe and steal it from him to use its powers to rule the world; however, the magic that made them come alive runs out just in time, and the toys become inanimate once again. Billy reverts to his normal size too, but is trapped inside the box.
34	8	"The Secret Snake Club"	Shaun Cashman and Juli Hashiguchi	Maxwell Atoms and C. H. Greenblatt	C. H. Greenblatt	February 21, 2005	TBA
At school, Billy, Mandy, and Irwin look for a club to join. Irwin plans to join the Macramé club to meet girls; Billy inquires on the Junior CIA club, which forcefully recruits him; Mandy joins the "Secret Snake Club", a snake-themed club consisting of three geeks. The nerds reveal that their "secret agenda" is to resurrect Shnissugah, a giant snake which lived hundreds of years ago in Canada, to take revenge against the popular kids, but they lack the power of the Underworld to do so. Mandy calls for Grim, who proceeds to revive Shnissugah through the internet, even though the geeks tie her up using their pet garden snake, Wiggly Jr. Billy, as a junior agent of the CIA, stops a criminal plan by Irwin, who was using the Macrame club for personal gain; and Shnissugah turns out to be a tiny, 8-cm (3.14-in) long, harmless snake who forces the nerds to untie Mandy and goes back into the internet. Mandy ends up beating up the three geeks severely.
35a	9a	"The Bad News Ghouls"	Brian Sheesley	Richard Horvitz and Vincent Waller	Vincent Waller	April 8, 2005	TBA
After Billy's baseball team loses badly against Mindy's, Grim decides to coach them. Mandy is not allowed on the team, as Billy is reluctant to let girls play, although he does not realize Mindy is a girl too. Mandy puts on a baseball cap and, assuming the role of "Manfred", pitches for Billy's team anyway. With additional help from ghoulish players which played in the Underworld Little Leagues alongside Grim, Billy's team wins when Pud'n hits a home run. Pud'n ends up being lifted up by the other baseball players in celebration, but ends up crying thinking that they were going to hurt him.
35b	9b	"The House of No Tomorrow"	Robert Alvarez	Nina Bargiel and Alex Almaguer	Alex Almaguer	April 8, 2005	TBA
While at Sassy Cat Land, a theme park dedicated to Sassy Cat (and ridiculously long lines), Billy, Mandy, and Grim stumble upon a closed attraction, a futuristic "house of tomorrow". Inside, they find Master-Control, a sentient and autonomous artificial intelligence who claims to know everything, and Tom Smith, a tour guide who was trapped in the house when it closed forty years ago due to Billy's dad annoying the robots and making them attack humans. Billy, Mandy, and Grim exit the house unharmed, but Tom misses his opportunity to escape and is left behind again.
36a	10a	"Wild Parts"	Shaun Cashman	Dr. Richard M. Burton and Bill Reiss	Bill Reiss	June 3, 2005	TBA
One night a strange odor travels through the city, prompting the noses of all the people, including Billy's, to follow it. The next night, Mandy, who is noseless, and Grim decide to wait outside Billy's house for the event to repeat. When the odor reappears, the nose parade leads them to the shopping mall, where they meet a "Nasalmancer", a nose wizard who is trying to take over other people's noses since he lost his own. Billy recovers his nose, but slices it in two, and gives one half to the Nasalmancer.
36b	10b	"The Problem With Billy"	Juli Hashiguchi	Brett Varon	Brett Varon	June 3, 2005	TBA
When Billy goes into the mud for the fifth time in the day while wearing his white tuxedo before a wedding, Grim tries to figure out why Billy is so stupid. Billy's dad recounts Billy's life from his birth until he met Mandy and explains that Billy is not dumb, but actually a genius with a certified "Honorary Genius Degree". It is quite evident to Grim that Billy's problem is his equally dumb father.
37a	11a	"Happy Huggy Stuffy Bears"	Brian Sheesley	Nina Bargiel and Spencer Laudiero	Spencer Laudiero	April 15, 2005	TBA
After a trip to the mall, Mandy becomes the spokesperson for Happy Huggy Stuffy Bears, a new stuffed toy in town. After the success of her commercial, Mandy gives away stuffed bears, which were her payment from the commercial, to the other children in the neighborhood, who start wreaking havoc in the city. Eris, the goddess of chaos, is behind the toys, which control the children into creating chaos. Mandy decides not to share control of the world with Eris, and orders Grim to destroy the toys, which he does.
37b	11b	"The Secret Decoder Ring"	Robert Alvarez, Shaun Cashman, and Randy Myers	Zena Wyss and Michael Diederich	Michael Diederich	April 15, 2005	TBA
When Billy finally gets a "secret decoder ring" in his Blasto Bits cereal, he receives a holographic message from a strange feminine creature who speaks about finding the "Secret of the Universe" in an abandoned mine shaft. All the other children of Endsville, also with decoder rings, race to the mine to be the first one to get the Secret. The entire effort is revealed to be a trap laid by Lubbermouth, a female worm-like creature from Grim's past who has a major crush on Grim, who wishes to free herself from the curse of guarding the Secret. When Mindy looks down at the pit, Lubbermouth pushes Mindy into it. She becomes the new guardian of the Secret and has to stay there forever.
38	12	"Wishbones"	Juli Hashiguchi and Brian Sheesley	C. Scott Morse Shaun Cashman Alex Almaguer C. H. Greenblatt Michael Diederich Maxwell Atoms Ian Wasseluk Paul McEvoy and Thurop Van Orman Paul McEvoy C. Scott Morse	C. Scott Morse Shaun Cashman Alex Almaguer C. H. Greenblatt Michael Diederich Maxwell Atoms Ian Wasseluk Paul McEvoy and Thurop Van Orman Paul McEvoy C. Scott Morse	June 10, 2005	TBA
After Grim's robe comes out of the washing machine, Billy and Mandy find Thromnambular, a talking skull-like artifact who was imprisoned on Earth and must grant nine wishes to be free. When Mandy asks Grim why he has not used any of the wishes, Grim tells her that the skull will corrupt the wishes and end up affecting the wisher. Despite this, Billy runs away with the skull and makes the first wish: (1) he wishes to be in an adventure (which parodies Indiana Jones and Jonny Quest), this backfires because Irwin is eaten, which Billy complains about getting him in trouble. After this, Thromnambular is found by different people who each make a wish: (2) Billy's dad wishes he could relive his high school years, but this backfires because he is not popular; (3) General Skarr wishes to rule on high, but this backfires because he suffocates in space; (4) Irwin wishes he was in a hip-hop music video, but backfires because he gets punched by Mandy; (5) Pud'n wishes he had a bunny, but backfires because he is almost killed by it, because "Sometimes Love Hurts"; (6) Nergal Junior wastes his wish by wishing for a wish that would not backfire; (7) Sperg wishes for a way to get into the girls restroom to bully a girl into giving him a large sack of money, this backfires because he is turned into girl and insulted by the other girls for being ugly; (8) Mindy wishes to be a "big star", but this backfires when she is sent into space strapped to a rocket; (9) finally, Mandy tries to auction the last wish, but Grim gets ahead and wishes the kids never found the skull in the first place. This goes back to the beginning of the episode where Billy is staring at the washing machine, followed by Mandy pushing him into it. Afterward, Grim attempts to wish for freedom from Billy and Mandy, but this backfires because Thromnambular switches places with him to grant the wish.
39a	13a	"Dream Mutt"	Shaun Cashman	Brett Varon	Brett Varon	June 17, 2005	TBA
When Billy gets the opportunity to adopt one of four dogs, he says he wants them all. Grim uses his scythe to magically combine the dogs and create Billy's dream dog, who calls himself Wiggy Jiggy Jed. Although initially Billy and Jed are best friends, their relationship falls apart when Billy tells Jed to sleep outside. Craving for a bed, Jed uses the powers of Grim's trunk to build a giant machine to capture the beds of all people, also planning to make a fortune with them. To stop him, Billy throws Jed a dish of primordial ooze that he got from Grim, and he dissolves. Billy then takes his cap.
39b	13b	"Scythe for Sale"	Robert Alvarez	Harriet Kim	Alex Almaguer	June 17, 2005	TBA
To raise money to buy Sea-Critters (similar to Sea-Monkeys), Billy has a garage sale where he sells Grim's scythe to Irwin for less than two cents, to Grim's fury. With the great mystical strength and power of the scythe, the now-corrupted Irwin hypnotizes Mandy and takes her on a romantic date, but not before turning Grim into a giant sea-critter. Billy and Grim try to recover the scythe, and when they do, Mandy gets out of the trance and Grim is returned to normal. Irwin is punished by Mandy and Grim for what he did to them by being transformed into a tiny sea-critter and placed in Billy's fish bowl.

=== Season 4 (2005) ===
No. overall	No. in season	Title	Directed by	Story by	Storyboarded by	Original release date	Prod. code
40a	1a	"Duck!"	Randy Myers and Juli Hashiguchi	Maxwell Atoms and C. H. Greenblatt	C. H. Greenblatt	June 24, 2005	TBA
After Grim has a nice dream, a nightmare escapes the back of his head in the shape of a supernatural, invisible duck that makes farting noises. The duck follows Grim everywhere, causing him embarrassment with the non-existent farts and to end up in jail. The duck repeats the strategy, following other citizens, including Irwin and Billy's dad, resulting in all of them going to jail too. The duck tries to annoy Mandy, but she remains imperturbable by its presence. The duck disappears and Principal Goodvibes is really angry, and he gives Mandy 75 days of detention.
40b	1b	"Aren't You Chupacabra to See Me?"	Shaun Cashman	Jeremy Bargiel and Ian Wasseluk	Ian Wasseluk	June 24, 2005	TBA
After being utterly bored of watching the same movie 60 times in a row, Grim takes Billy and Mandy to "Underworld Video" where they rent "The Legend of Chupacabra". While Billy watches the tape, a small, pink chupacabra emerges from his television and Billy decides to keep it as a pet, naming it Daisy. Mandy and Grim convince Billy that he is inept in taking good care of pets, and they return the blood-sucking chupacabra to the videotape.
41a	2a	"Zip Your Fly!"	Phil Cummings and Juli Hashiguchi	Maxwell Atoms and Louie del Carmen	Louie del Carmen	June 27, 2005	TBA
Billy and Mandy find a supernatural zipper from Grim's robe, which they use to create mischief. Mandy zips her head off to scare Billy, but then a fly comes and sits on the zip, resulting in Mandy's head being replaced with the fly's body and Mandy's body replaced with the fly's head. Mandy drops the zip's hook as it was heavy and goes for Grim's help; while she is gone the school devolves into anarchy. Harold catches her and tries to flush her down the toilet until Grim intervenes. He and Mandy find the hook has been taken to a dump, where she eats all the garbage to find the hook. The two then return to the school and zip Mandy's head back onto her normal body.
41b	2b	"Puddle Jumping"	Sue Perrotto	Mike Diederich	Mike Diederich	June 27, 2005	TBA
Billy jumps into a "cosmic sinkhole" and is transported to the home of Granny Applecheeks, who wants to bake him into a pie. It is up to Mandy and Grim to save him if the puddle can take them to the right place.
42a	3a	"He's Not Dead, He's My Mascot"	Phil Cummings, Juli Hashiguchi, and Eddy Houchins	Nina Bargiel and Alex Almaguer	Alex Almaguer	April 1, 2005	TBA
When Billy and Mandy's school is preparing for a big game, Mindy entrusts the care of the school's mascot, Fluffy Cat, to Billy, to protect him from being kidnapped by the rival team, the Booty Heads. At Billy's house, Fluffy Cat is a disaster, so Billy's mom throws him into the basement, where the cat gets inside Grim's trunk, absorbing its powers. A giant Fluffy Cat appears just before the game wreaking havoc and spitting out a furious Mandy who says, "This is why I hate cats."
42b	3b	"Hog Wild"	Shaun Cashman and Eddy Houchins	Brett Varon	Brett Varon	April 1, 2005	TBA
As Billy is tired of all the rules in his house, he cannot resist the urge to try his father's new motorcycle. The motorcycle breaks down as soon as Billy touches it, and Billy asks Grim to repair it. Grim's scythe turns the motorcycle into a wild, supernatural vehicle, which transforms Billy's parents and everyone around it into undead creatures and motorized monsters. Mandy makes Billy tell the truth about breaking the motorcycle in the first place, at which point his parents and everyone else return to normal and Billy himself is grounded.
43	4	"My Fair Mandy"	Shaun Cashman and Juli Hashiguchi	C. H. Greenblatt	C. H. Greenblatt	July 29, 2005	TBA
When it's scurvy-prevention day at school, Mindy parades in her float in anticipation for the Little Miss Scurvy beauty pageant, and she insults Mandy, telling her she is ugly. To prove her otherwise, and with Principal Goodvibes' encouragement, Mandy considers entering the pageant. Naturally, Billy and Grim cannot believe Mandy when she tells them about the idea, but finally they decide to help her. Grim calls for Crabina, the Underworld's greatest makeup artist, to give Mandy a complete makeover. Crabina is shocked by Mandy's sour attitude, so she sets up principally to make her smile. At the pageant, Mandy has a real chance at winning the contest, but she still refuses to smile during her heart-warming musical number. When she ultimately does so, she remakes the universe into that of The Powerpuff Girls, with Billy, Mandy, and Grim turning into the Powerpuff Girls, Irwin turning into Mojo Jojo, and Professor Utonium briefly appearing as himself.
44a	5a	"Jeffy's Web"	Robert Alvarez and Eddy Houchins	Maxwell Atoms and Louie del Carmen	Louie del Carmen	June 24, 2005	TBA
When Billy gets under his house's foundation, he encounters again his "son", Jeff the Spider, who has just laid eggs. Jeff tries to make things right with Billy so he can take care of the baby spiders, as he is going to die after the eggs hatch. Naturally terrified of seeing Jeff, Billy runs away and a wild car chase ensues. The eggs hatch, and Grim decides to refill Jeff's hourglass that represents his lifetime so he does not die and can continue to scare Billy.
44b	5b	"Irwin Gets a Clue"	Sue Perrotto	Zena Wyss and Jim Schumann	Jim Schumann	June 24, 2005	TBA
After seeing Billy, Mandy, and Grim battling a strange creature, Irwin again feels rejected by Mandy. Hoss Delgado, spectral exterminator, appears to help Mandy destroy the monster. Delgado decides to have Irwin as his sidekick and train him to be "cool" to win Mandy's love. Irwin gets an attire like Delgado's, and attaches an egg beater to his right hand. Delgado releases a monster so Irwin can fight it and impress Mandy, but he is humiliated anyway. Mandy tells Irwin he is just a nerd, and Billy tries to assure him that being a nerd is not such a bad thing after all.
45a	6a	"Runaway Pants"	Sue Perrotto	Maxwell Atoms and Alex Almaguer	Alex Almaguer	June 28, 2005	TBA
At school it is time for the "Presidents Fitness Test", but Billy is unfit for exercise. On the other hand, Nergal Junior uses his shapeshifting powers to become fit at will and excel in every test. Billy asks Junior to transform into a pair of pants that he can wear, so he can run fast and win the 50-meter race. Since Junior has never attempted to transform into inanimate objects he cannot stop running and cannot revert to his human form. Billy keeps running forever while he becomes a national sensation known as the "Fitness Lad". It is revealed that the story was a fabrication created by the narrator, who parodies The Twilight Zone.
45b	6b	"Scythe 2.0"	Phil Cummings	Maxwell Atoms and Mike Diederich	Mike Diederich	June 28, 2005	TBA
After Grim's scythe fails to open a portal, he decides to sharpen it, but the blade breaks. Billy, Mandy, and Grim go to the Underworld to meet F (a parody of James Bond's "Q"), who is in charge of the Underworld secret gadgets. F unveils Scythe 2.0, which is a new-and-improved sentient, autonomous, thinking and feeling computerized scythe, that Grim uses while his classic scythe is being repaired. When Mandy tells Grim to do his usual, humiliating chores, Grim delegates the work to Scythe 2.0, which rebels and decides to reap by itself, starting with Billy and Mandy. Grim saves the kids, takes Scythe 2.0 back to the Underworld, and returns with his old scythe.
46a	7a	"The Firebird Sweet"	Shaun Cashman	Drew Neumann and Aaron Springer	Aaron Springer	June 29, 2005	TBA
When Billy buys a new cereal, a phoenix emerges from the box and attaches to his head, annoying everybody. Since the phoenix cannot be removed because it revives every time it is destroyed, Billy, Mandy, and Grim seek help by going to the factory where the cereal is produced, which is run by Eris, the goddess of chaos. Mandy tricks the phoenix into leaving Billy and attacking Eris instead. It is revealed that all the events were really an episode-within-an-episode.
46b	7b	"The Bubble With Billy"	Russell Calabrese and Juli Hashiguchi	Brett Varon	Brett Varon	June 29, 2005	TBA
When Billy desperately wants chewing gum at school, Grim gives him a bottomless gumball machine, but warns him not to swallow the gum. Billy ignores this, causing him to constantly burp bubbles that fill the entire city. Mandy and Grim try to get Billy to cough the remaining gum that he has in his stomach, but instead Billy swallows the entire gumball machine. Billy coughs huge amounts of gum all over the city and ends up with a supernatural rash from another interdimensional world.
47a	8a	"Billy Idiot"	Sue Perrotto	Ian Wasseluk and Alex Almaguer	Alex Almaguer	June 30, 2005	TBA
When Billy is accepted to Mrs. Pollywinkle's dancing academy, his father tries to persuade him to forget about dancing because of his own bad experience as a child during a recital. At the academy it is revealed that Mrs. Pollywinkle is actually a powerful, dark witch set on stealing Billy's soul. Billy's dad unexpectedly comes to rescue, challenging Mrs. Pollywinkle to a dance competition, which he wins using a powerful dance move. Billy's dad tells Billy to follow his dream of becoming a dancer if he so wishes, but Billy changes his mind saying that dancing is for girls.
47b	8b	"Home of the Ancients"	Robert Alvarez and Sue Perrotto	C. H. Greenblatt	C. H. Greenblatt	June 30, 2005	TBA
When Grim misuses his powers to play bowling with asteroids, he is taken to the Underworld court and sentenced to 50 hours of community service. At a retirement home, Billy, Mandy, and Grim go to the supernatural wing, which is the Home of the Ancients, a place for retired, geriatric monsters. Grim meets his childhood idols, the Bride of Frankenstein, Dracula, and the Wolf Man. Despite Billy's comments that the old monsters are finished, Grim sets out to prove that they are still scary. Grim tries to scare a bunch of kids in the woods, but the old monsters ruin his attempt and he walks out on them.
48a	9a	"One Crazy Summoner"	Juli Hashiguchi	Maxwell Atoms and Michael Diederich	Michael Diederich	August 5, 2005	TBA
When Billy's parents are attacked by an anaconda, Billy suggest visiting boy wizard Nigel Planter, because he can talk to snakes. Planter in fact does not speak to snakes, but to snacks, and instead he asks for Billy, Mandy, and Grim's help to win the affections of Huffefnie Pfefferpfeffer, a beautiful witch in the School of Sorcery (and having a striking resemblance to Gladys). Planter tries using a love potion and enchanted chocolates, but they do not work. The guys end up completely forgetting about Billy's parents.
48b	9b	"Guess What's Coming to Dinner?"	Shaun Cashman and Phil Cummings	Maxwell Atoms and Jim Schumann	Jim Schumann	August 5, 2005	TBA
When Billy's parents leave for their second honeymoon, Billy is left alone at the worst possible moment, since he has invited Principal Goodvibes over to dinner so he can recommend him into Rollington Academy for the Gifted. Billy's dad suggest Billy to use Eris, the goddess of chaos, and Hoss Delgado, spectral exterminator, as his substitute parents during the dinner. The dinner is a disaster with Delgado terrorizing Goodvibes and Eris unleashing alien zombie lobsters. Goodvibes forcefully recommends Billy into Rollington Academy, which turns out to be a military school.
49a	10a	"Mommy Fiercest"	Russell Calabrese and Sue Perrotto	Brett Varon	Brett Varon	August 12, 2005	TBA
When Billy's mom discovers wrinkles on her face, she panics and does not want to leave the bathroom. As Grim needs to use the bathroom, he uses his scythe to make Gladys a young girl again. Gladys goes to see Billy, but neither he nor Mandy nor Irwin recognize her and instead, Billy calls her "Corn", because of the white bread she gave him. When Corn tells Billy to do his homework, Mandy tells him to go to the movie theater instead. Corn and Mandy struggle over who gets to control Billy. Billy's father plays with Grim's scythe and also becomes a child; he then goes to the movies and gets together with Gladys (Corn) again.
49b	10b	"The Taking Tree"	Juli Hashiguchi and Eddy Houchins	Brian Larsen and Maxwell Atoms	Brian Larsen	August 12, 2005	TBA
When Billy, Mandy, and Grim notice things have been disappearing in the house, they set out to investigate using a supernatural detector. They find the culprit is a talking "taking tree" in Billy's yard, who has been stealing objects since Billy's dad was a child. To make the tree happy, Mandy and Grim set out to trade the stolen belongings for a highly-valued Mickey Munchle baseball card. Mandy and Grim return from the baseball shop with the real Mickey Munchle. The tree returns all of the stolen things, but keeps the player.
50a	11a	"Reap Walking"	Robert Alvarez	James Silverman and Louie del Carmen	Louie del Carmen	October 7, 2005	TBA
When the mall's surveillance cameras capture Grim's silhouette attacking endangered owls, Australian naturalist Corey Nebraska blames Grim for the attacks, while Mandy suspects Grim is sleepwalking again. Billy, Mandy, and Nebraska follow Grim while he sleepwalks, but they realize it turns out to be Billy's mom, the one attacking the owls. When discovered, Gladys reveals her hatred toward the owls as she recounts the story on how an owl ate her pet rat, Sniffles, years ago. Harold then reveals that he's the one who ate Sniffles, but Gladys forgives him.
50b	11b	"The Loser from the Earth's Core"	Shaun Cashman and Phil Cummings	Maxwell Atoms and Aaron Springer	Aaron Springer	October 7, 2005	TBA
When Nergal goes to visit Billy's family for the weekend, he ends up staying with them over a year. When Billy finally asks his uncle to leave, Nergal says he cannot return home because he is a complete failure, having lost at a board game 599 times in a row against his own family, and experiencing constant disappointment elsewhere. Billy and Grim tell him to not worry about being a failure, but to embrace it. After training with Billy and Grim, Nergal returns home and he finally wins at the board game, but he also makes a crack in the ceiling and his home starts filling with lava.
51a	12a	"Ecto Cooler"	Russell Calabrese and Sue Perrotto	Maxwell Atoms	Maxwell Atoms	October 14, 2005	TBA
As Billy desires to be "cool" like Sperg, he has an ectoplasmic manifestation coming out of his mouth. The ectoplasm grows full size and turns out to be the ghost of nineteenth-century British poet Lord Byron, who tries to teach Billy to be cool, using elaborate poetry instead of bare muscles. Billy uses a poem to insult Sperg's mother, and Sperg challenges Billy to a duel. Billy and Lord Byron fight Sperg and his gang, but are badly beaten. Byron tells Billy he has been trained in the arts of coolness, and disappears.
51b	12b	"The Schlubs"	Eddy Houchins	Maxwell Atoms	John Holmquist	October 14, 2005	TBA
As Grim watches the entire season of "My Troubled Pony" (parodying My Little Pony), he learns from Mandy that the show was cancelled and does not have an ending. Grim decides to reap the "Schlubs" (a parody of The Smurfs), 100 creatures that live in Billy's yard, to melt them into gold so he can finance the creation of the series finale. Grim must get past Billy and the aggressive Schlubs themselves, including the single, large female (a parody of Smurfette). After Grim thinks he got the creatures with his scythe, Mandy appears to have used all the gold herself to become rich.
52	13	"Prank Call of Cthulhu"	Russell Calabrese, Juli Hashiguchi, Eddy Houchins, Robert Hughes, and Sue Perrotto	Maxwell Atoms, Alex Almaguer, and Mike Diederich	Alex Almaguer and Mike Diederich	October 21, 2005	TBA
When Billy and Irwin start making prank calls, everybody knows that Billy is behind the calls because every telephone has a caller ID. While Billy searches in Grim's trunk in the basement for something to defeat the caller ID, he finds a skull-shaped phone with no caller ID. Grim warns him to not use the phone, because it is used to call the ancient demon Cthulhu, whose sole appearance makes people go mad, and if awakened will cause the destruction of the world. Despite Grim's warning, Billy and Irwin use the phone anyway, and they are sucked into it by tentacles. After the commotion, Mandy and Grim go search for Billy, and they find themselves in a strange place with other tentacled creatures. In this place, Billy and Irwin have been hired as official prank callers and steadily turn into tentacled monsters. Their pranks transform the people answering the phone into monsters, and Mandy decides to confront Cthulhu himself to put an end to this. Mandy tricks Cthulhu into answering her cell phone, and when he is sucked into it, Mandy disconnects the call, trapping Cthulhu in the telephone lines forever.

=== Season 5 (2006) ===
No. overall	No. in season	Title	Directed by	Story by	Storyboarded by	Original release date	Prod. code
53a	1a	"Billy Ocean"	Juli Hashiguchi and Sue Perrotto	Tim McKeon and Alex Almaguer	Alex Almaguer	January 6, 2006	TBA
When Billy, Mandy, and Grim go to the beach, Billy is swallowed by a whale known as Blubbery Joe, which also houses in her stomach Mister Geppetto and Pinocchio from Nursery Crimes. Tired of not having a real son, Geppetto convinces Billy to be his "real son", while Pinocchio becomes increasingly jealous and is set on eating Billy's flesh again to become a real boy and gain Geppetto's fatherly love and affection. Mandy and Grim search for Billy on board Captain Deadwood's ship, who is made of wood and who has been hunting Blubbery Joe for years. Billy, Geppetto, and Pinocchio are expelled from Blubbery Joe's stomach, and as Billy needs to go home, Blubbery Joe accepts to be Geppetto's son.
53b	1b	"Hill Billy"	Shaun Cashman	Brett Varon	Brett Varon	January 6, 2006	TBA
When Mandy and Grim tell Billy to quit watching TV and follow his life dreams, Billy gets into a chicken costume and decides to become a famous "chicken juggler". When Billy's mom tries to convince him to be a chiropractor instead, Billy runs away to Uncle Chokey's farm to pursue his dream. Billy and Uncle Chokey juggle chickens at the rhythm of an old phonograph, whose music turns the farm into a 1920s black and white rubber hose cartoon. Due to an egg shortage in the city, Mandy and Grim go to the farm to investigate. They destroy the phonograph and things return to normal.
54	2	"Keeper of the Reaper"	Juli Hashiguchi and Eddy Houchins	Richard Horvitz, Kristen Lazarian, and C. H. Greenblatt	C. H. Greenblatt	January 13, 2006	TBA
When Billy's dad gets a promotion in his job, he tells his family they are going to move to another town, starting a dispute between Billy and Mandy over who gets custody of Grim. Grim suggests they settle this in court, and hours later Billy, Mandy, and Grim find themselves in the Underworld court, presided by Judge Roy Spleen, and which has Fred Fredburger, an incorrigible dumb character, as a juror. During the trial, Billy calls for Irwin to testify in his favor; Mandy tries to discredit Billy by presenting his failed history taking care of pets, including Jeff the Spider, Little Porkchop, and Wiggy Jiggy Jed; Billy responds by calling Mandy's parents, Mindy, Eris, and others, such as Scooby-Doo, and Major Dr. Ghastly (from Evil Con Carne). During the entire trial, Fred Fredburger interrupts constantly, using the Judge's gavel, asking for permission to go to the bathroom, eating nachos, and just repeating his name and his characteristic "Yes". When the jury has to vote over who becomes the "Keeper of the Reaper", the result is a tie, and Fred Fredburger is the tiebreaker. Since Fred only says "Yes", the Judge decides Grim should not be separated from either Billy or Mandy, so he places Billy's family under house arrest and they are not allowed to move.
55a	3a	"Modern Primitives"	Shaun Cashman	Maxwell Atoms and Alex Almaguer	Alex Almaguer	January 27, 2006	TBA
When Billy digs his front yard he finds a frozen caveman, who is actually Fred Flintstone (from The Flintstones), but whom Billy names Jake Steele. Billy tries to acclimate Fred to the modern life but the job is not easy. When Fred is taken to school, he predictably goes out of control, kidnapping Miss Butterbean and running away in Principal Goodvibes' car. The ensuing chase results in Fred crashing into an ice cream truck, becoming frozen again. Instead of reaping him, Billy decides to bury Fred in the yard again. A future is shown where both Billy and Fred are defrosted by brain-eating creatures.
55b	3b	"Giant Billy and Mandy All Out Attack"	Sue Perrotto	Jeff Prezenkowski and Alex Que	Alex Que	January 27, 2006	TBA
When Billy and Irwin want to watch classic giant monster movies, Grim decides to take them to Japan to see real monsters. They meet the turtle-like Cragorah (a parody of Gamera) who engages in a fierce battle with the three-headed Kittirah (a cat version of King Ghidorah). To help Cragorah, Grim transforms Billy into a giant monster too (a parody of Ultraman). Mandy soon arrives with the intent of punishing them all for organizing this expedition without her permission. Controlling Mecha-Gorillasaur (a giant gorilla robot) she defeats Kittirah and beats Billy.
56a	4a	"The Wrongest Yard"	Sue Perrotto	Tim McKeon and Ian Wasseluk	Ian Wasseluk	March 20, 2006	TBA
When Billy and Irwin are yet again bullied by Sperg, they decide to play for the school's football team so they are not bullied anymore. During practice, Irwin shows a powerful arm and he becomes the starting quarterback, while Billy is relegated to being a punching bag. During their first game, Mandy directs the team into scoring their first ever touchdown, so Coach Kilgore gives her the job of captain cheerleader, taking it away from Mindy. With Irwin's arm and Mandy's cheerleading the team reaches the finals. Mindy tries different ways to get back at Mandy and recover her job, but she ends up affecting her own team, which eventually loses the game.
56b	4b	"Druid, Where's My Car?"	Juli Hashiguchi, Eddy Houchins, and Russell Calabrese	Maxwell Atoms and Mike Diederich	Mike Diederich	March 20, 2006	TBA
When Billy gets his kite stuck in a tree, he starts throwing objects at it to knock it down, including Mandy and a group of three boy scouts, but all objects get stuck too. Frustrated, Billy and Grim call a druid for help, who in turn trains them to become druids, so the three of them can perform a ritual. Meanwhile, inside the tree, Mandy battles a group of squirrels, and leads the scouts back to the ground. Since the druidic chants did not work against the tree, the druid goes ahead and uses a chainsaw to bring the tree down, but this gets him arrested.
57a	5a	"Herbicidal Maniac"	Shaun Cashman	C. H. Greenblatt	C. H. Greenblatt	March 21, 2006	TBA
When General Skarr tries to get rid of a weed in his otherwise perfect garden, he asks Grim to use his scythe to do the job. Billy drives a lawnmower and ruins the garden; also, the scythe's magic accidentally shoots Skarr, transforming him into a plant-like creature. Using his new plant powers, Skarr rebuilds his garden, and tries to exact revenge on Billy by throwing a party, and attacking him. Skarr gets mulched by a helicopter rotor, but is reborn as a small weed.
57b	5b	"Chaos Theory"	Eddy Houchins	James Silverman and Mike Diederich	Mike Diederich	March 21, 2006	TBA
When Mandy and Grim go to the warehouse store, Mandy notices that everything seems to be in order, lacking any presence of chaos. Hoss Delgado arrives saying that everything has been that way since he started dating Eris, the goddess of chaos. Mandy assures Delgado he must break up with Eris to restore chaos, but fearing her temper, he is reluctant to do so. After failed attempts by Grim, Mandy, Billy, and Irwin to break their relationship, Delgado finally tells Eris the truth about he wanting to break up, and she complies by turning into a giant insect and devouring him.
58a	6a	"The Love That Dare Not Speak Its Name"	Eddy Houchins	Jeremy Bargiel and Alex Almaguer	Alex Almaguer	January 20, 2006	TBA
When Billy decides he wants to grow up to be like Grim, he says nothing will stand in the way of their friendship. They meet a girl named Blandy, who looks very much like Billy, and Billy falls completely head-over-heels in love with her. When Blandy shows romantic interest in Grim, Billy is struck with mad jealousy and wants Grim out of the picture. Mandy consults Grim's encyclopedia of monsters and realizes Blandy is an interdimensional creature. Despite Blandy showing her true form and leaving, Billy remains madly romantically infatuated with her; but only up until the following episode.
58b	6b	"Major Cheese"	Juli Hashiguchi and Sue Perrotto	Brett Varon	Brett Varon	January 20, 2006	TBA
Billy, Mandy, and Grim visit Mighty Moe, an old man who has discovered the secret to add extra years to his lifespan: a good diet and exercise. Mighty Moe decides to publish his secret in a book, and Grim attempts to stop him by offering junk food. Grim then decides that if he can't kill Mighty Moe, then he'll have to destroy every copy of his book. Grim sends the truck delivering all of the book's copies into the Sun, and Moe grabs onto it. Grim assumes that Moe had died from the intense heat, but it's revealed that he's alive and selling his books to the Sun-people, only to have each copy burnt by them.
59a	7a	"A Grim Day"	Sue Perrotto and Shaun Cashman	Jeff Prezenkowski and Alex Que	Alex Que	March 22, 2006	TBA
When Billy goes to visit his maternal grandmother and Mandy decides to have the day for herself, Grim finds himself free of the kids to do whatever he wants to do. Since Grim quickly gets bored he goes to visit General Skarr, and lets him take his magical scythe, which Skarr uses to build an army of lawn gnomes. Since Grim is so used to having two kids with him when they go on an adventure, he enlists Mindy and Pud'n to help him combat Skarr and retrieve his scythe. Mindy and Pud'n prove to be worthy substitutes but they are scared away by Mandy when she notices the unusual trio.
59b	7b	"Pandora's Lunch Box"	Shaun Cashman	Nina Bargiel and Ian Wasseluk	Ian Wasseluk	March 22, 2006	TBA
There is a new student in the school, named Dora (parodying Dora the Explorer), who insists on getting people to open her lunch box. Mandy befriends Dora once she gets into a fight with the snobby Mindy. While noting something strange with Dora, Grim does not recognize her as Pandora until it is too late and she tricks Mandy into opening Pandora's box, releasing numerous plagues upon humanity. Mandy restores everything to normal, and captures Pandora inside the box, saying that nobody tricks her, and that when the time is right Mandy herself will unleash humanity's destruction.
60	8	"Billy & Mandy vs. the Martians"	Juli Hashiguchi and Eddy Houchins	Maxwell Atoms, Nina Bargiel, and Jeremy Bargiel	John Banh and Mike Diederich	March 23, 2006	TBA
When Billy destroys Grim's favorite childhood toy, Fancy Jake, Grim feels devastated and wishes he had never lost the limbo game that made him become Billy and Mandy's best friend forever. A lawyer appears saying that although the game is legally binding while all parties remain on Earth, it is not if Grim leaves Earth. In consequence, Grim follows the lawyer's advice, opens a mystical portal, and leaves. With Grim traveling aboard his spaceship, the lawyer takes off his disguise and introduces himself as Morg, the Martians' emperor and Grim Reaper, who commands an army of zombies. So Grim can get the respect he deserves, Morg convinces Grim to conquer Earth, which they do easily while enslaving and turning all of the people into zombies. Next for the reapers is to use the ultimate weapon in mind control, the Braincaster, which, if powered by a dumb and stupid mind, will allow them to control all of the zombies forever. Meanwhile, Billy, Mandy, and Irwin, who followed Grim to Mars hidden in his bottomless trunk, look for a way to save Earth. When the kids are captured, and Billy is strapped to the Braincaster, all hope seems lost. Billy talks to Grim about friendship, and Grim has a change of heart and decides to help Mandy. Billy's stupid, idiotic brain overpowers the Braincaster, returning all of the people to normal and foiling Morg's plan, who disappears into outer space.
61a	9a	"Dumb-Dumbs & Dragons"	Sue Perrotto	Maxwell Atoms and Alex Almaguer	Alex Almaguer	May 12, 2006	TBA
As Billy sees Hoss Delgado's manliness is action again, Billy wishes to grow up to be a hero like him. Grim tells Billy that in older times an evident way to become a hero was to slay a dragon. They travel to the Middle Ages so Billy can train under the supervision of the best dragon slayer, Sir Boss Del Guapo, who resembles the present time Delgado. Billy becomes friends with the dragon he was supposed to kill and spares his life, becoming the dragon's hero. Del Guapo finds himself transported to the present, where he has a brief encounter with Delgado.
61b	9b	"Fear and Loathing in Endsville"	Shaun Cashman, Juli Hashiguchi, and Eddy Houchins	C. H. Greenblatt	C. H. Greenblatt	May 12, 2006	TBA
When Grim decides to visit again his childhood idol, the aged king of the vampires, Dracula; the latter suggest they drive to an early bird buffet, only to get lost in the scorching desert. Grim and Dracula need to find their way back home while dealing with situations like meeting a creepy truck driver and being attacked by a giant scorpion and her babies, who poison Grim. After what they have gone through, and thinking that Dracula is just a selfish old man, Grim decides to go a separate way. He meets a friendly sand person, who invites him to his house. After finding that Dracula helped him by sucking out the scorpions' venom, Grim rushes to help Dracula, and the sand person lends Grim his car. After finding Dracula, they return to the city and finally make it to the diner. However, it appears that Dracula left without paying the check, which forces Grim to pay it himself and return home in disgust, upset that he had been betrayed.
62a	10a	"Dad Day Afternoon"	Eddy Houchins	Brett Varon	Brett Varon	June 5, 2006	TBA
As Billy and Mandy celebrate Father's Day, Grim becomes depressed that he sits inside Billy's closet only listening to country rock music. Grim explains that, since his own father cared more about country rock than him, he has been living a lie; telling his father he is a famous country rock singer, and not the actual Grim Reaper. Mandy arranges for Grim's father to come visit and she tells him the truth, but still the old man does not believe her. Grim decides that the only way for his dad to listen to him is while performing country music. At an outdoor concert, Billy, Mandy, and Grim start performing a country rock song, in which eventually Grim reveals his supernatural abilities as the mighty Grim Reaper to his father. Grim's dad accepts his son is the Reaper, but he still does not forgive him for lying to him.
62b	10b	"Scary Poppins"	Sue Perrotto	Shaun Cashman	Alex Almaguer	June 5, 2006	TBA
As Mandy returns from Billy's house, it is evident that Mandy's parents are extremely afraid of their daughter and her iron fist rule over them. Unable to live in fear any longer, Mandy's parents call a nanny who specializes in disciplining spoiled children. Mandy and the nanny clash while the nanny tries to teach Mandy's parents to show authority to control their daughter. Grim helps the nanny in her feud against Mandy by using his scythe to make Mandy's parents more controlling and resolute. Mandy quickly restores her tyrannic control over her parents, and shows the nanny she actually controls everything and everyone.
63a	11a	"Hurter Monkey"	Shaun Cashman, Sue Perrotto, and Eddy Houchins	Anna Chambers, Zena Logan, and Ian Wasseluk	Ian Wasseluk	July 10, 2006	TBA
When Mandy says even a trained monkey is more competent to do cleaning chores than Grim, and would complain less, Grim makes Dickie Galoot, a monkey appearing in a Japanese-styled animation, come to life to prove her wrong. As Dickie turns out to be extremely good at cleaning Mandy's house, Grim decides to leave the kids for good. Due to his friendship contract, Grim is unable to break free, and he is forced to battle Dickie to recover his place as the "cleaning monkey" of the group. Dickie himself reveals that he intended all along to supplant Grim since, similar to Grim's situation, he was fed up with his own normal life in the show he was brought out of. Grim successfully defeats Dickie at cleaning Billy's house and sends Dickie back into the show from whence he came, but this all turns out to be an ingenious plan devised by Mandy to win a bet against Billy.
63b	11b	"Goodbling and the Hip Hop Opotamus"	Juli Hashiguchi, Eddy Houchins, and Russell Calabrese	James Silverman and Alex Almaguer	Alex Almaguer	July 10, 2006	TBA
At a school fair, Grim's scythe accidentally transforms the dull Principal Goodvibes and his hippopotamus into gangster rappers, Goodvibes now calling himself Principal Goodbling. In the following, Goodbling changes the entire school to be more hip hop music-oriented, to the annoyance of Mandy. Although initially Grim likes the new style of the school principal, he later thinks Goodbling is just a poseur and goes to talk to him, but Goodbling attacks with the mother insult. Irwin's grandmother, Tanya, confronts Goodbling and proves to be better than he is at yo-mama jokes that Goodbling reverts to being the boring Goodvibes.
64a	12a	"Spidermandy"	Eddy Houchins	Maxwell Atoms and Jim Schumann	Jim Schumann	July 24, 2006	TBA
When Billy finds his "son" Jeff the Spider lying in his bed with "Spider Pox", he goes to Mandy for help to get rid of the giant spider. While ignoring Billy, the next morning Mandy awakens afflicted by Spider Pox too, developing four additional arms and the ability to produce spider web. Mandy's condition progresses and she completely turns into a giant spider, who captures Billy's parents and Grim. Grim tells Billy that, to cure Mandy, he must use the venom of the spider that infected her. While Billy successfully gives Mandy Jeff's venom, he also carried the virus and infected the people of the city, who have all turned into spiders.
64b	12b	"Be A-Fred, Be Very A-Fred"	Sue Perrotto	C. H. Greenblatt	C. H. Greenblatt	July 24, 2006	TBA
As Grim appears in an Underworld TV commercial for "Big Move" laxative pills, an accompanying contest promises a day with the famous Grim Reaper to the monster who writes the best 500-word-or-less essay describing the fun things they would do. It turns out the winner of the contest, and sole participant, is the dimwitted Fred Fredburger, who only wants to eat frozen yogurt. The Big Move company blames Grim for their sales going down since they hired him. In consequence, Grim tries save his reputation and make the best day for Fred, but it is a disaster with Grim ruining Fred's yogurt and Fred going missing in an amusement park. The Big Move executives give Grim a beating for ruining their company, and Fred finds his own paradise in a cold place with nachos- and frozen yogurt-loving creatures.
65a	13a	"The Crass Unicorn"	Shaun Cashman	Maxwell Atoms and Cindy Morrow	Cindy Morrow	August 9, 2006	TBA
As Billy notices Mandy and Grim's usual negative attitude, he wishes they were in a magical land of happiness, so Grim transports them to an enchanted forest. Billy enjoys the relaxed surroundings until he meets a cantankerous and sour unicorn named Mary-Frances. Billy tries to change Mary-Frances' attitude, but she is reluctant due to an earlier trauma of not being able to swim and follow the other unicorns into the sea. After Billy teaches Mary-Frances to swim, she feels happy and finally can join the other unicorns, but they turn out to be bullies, the real reason she never joined them in the first place. Billy stays with the unicorns and Mary-Frances goes back with Mandy and Grim to watch TV.
65b	13b	"Billy & Mandy Begins"	Juli Hashiguchi	Jeff Prezenkowski, Mike Diederich, Maxwell Atoms, and Antoine Guilbaud	Mike Diederich, Maxwell Atoms, and Antoine Guilbaud	August 9, 2006	TBA
As Billy, Mandy, Grim, and Irwin hang from a rope about to be eaten by a giant sea serpent, Irwin wonders how they came into that trouble. Billy and Grim each tell separate stories on how they originally became best friends forever and ever. Billy's fantastic story is about him and Mandy being space patrol officers who collect the Grim Reaper's bones, cloak, and skull to summon him; Grim explains how Billy and Mandy managed to capture him inside a containment unit (parodying the Ghostbusters' ghost traps). Mandy quickly tells the real story, and footage from the first episode is seen, before the rope snaps and the serpent eats the four whole.

=== Season 6 (2006–07) ===
No. overall	No. in season	Title	Directed by	Story by	Storyboarded by	Original release date	Prod. code
66a	1a	"Everything Breaks"	Matt Engstrom and Russell Calabrese	Mike Diederich	Mike Diederich	October 6, 2006	TBA
As Billy behaves more reckless than ever and cannot stop breaking everything in sight, Mandy thinks he should go some place where he can release all his urge to destroy until he gets tired of it. Mandy, Grim, and Irwin go to Level 9, home of the fearsome warrior Lord Pain, to convince him to take Billy. Billy receives psychological treatment and it is revealed that his desire to destroy stems from lack of attention when he was younger. Lord Pain abducts him, and together they start destroying everything in Level 9, which seems to be is uninhabited. Billy is still not satisfied, so he and Lord Pain return to Endsville and carry on breaking everything.
66b	1b	"The Show That Dare Not Speak Its Name"	Kris Sherwood	Alex Almaguer and Holly Almaguer	Alex Almaguer	October 6, 2006	TBA
When Grim leaves the house to meet someone he met on the internet, Billy looks inside Grim's trunk for something to entertain himself. Billy finds a magical talking Rubik's Cube, which releases the demon Pinface, who has bowling pins in his head. Pinface proceeds to call his minions to conquer Earth, but the minions are more interested in throwing a house party. It is revealed that Grim and Pinface already know each other, and Grim even broke up with Pinface's sister. Billy's father ends up cheating and solves the magical cube by rearranging the stickers, trapping Pinface and his minions inside it again.
67a	2a	"The Secret Snake Club vs. P.E."	Shaun Cashman and Russell Calabrese	C. H. Greenblatt	C. H. Greenblatt	October 20, 2006	TBA
As Billy realizes the three geeks of the Secret Snake Club get doctor's notes to avoid Physical Education (P.E.) class, he wants to know their secret to avoid the class too. All the boys in the class join the club and all, except Billy, get doctor's notes from Billy's dad, who poses as a doctor. While Billy is the only one exercising in the class, the Snake Club summons a snake to destroy the gym. Since the invoked snake is tiny, Sperg uses Grim's scythe to make it a giant. Mandy and the other girls beat the boys and their snake because they did appreciate the P.E. class as an outlet for their aggression.
67b	2b	"King Tooten Pooten"	R. Michel Lyman	C. H. Greenblatt and Ian Wasseluk	Ian Wasseluk	October 20, 2006	TBA
When Billy, Mandy, and Grim attend an Ancient Egypt exhibit at the museum, they meet with Irwin who explains that, as his mother is a mummy, they are visiting Irwin's grandfather, the great Pharaoh King Popen Locken. Later that night, Irwin's grandfather visits Irwin in his room and offers him the Pharaoh's crown and the possibility of building his own pyramid to attract women; Irwin accepts, calling himself King Tooten Pooten, and soon they turn the citizens into slaves to build the pyramid. Against his mother's wishes, Irwin decides to finish the pyramid; however, there is something he did not anticipate, as he, the Pharaoh, needs to remain entombed inside it.
68a	3a	"Billy Gets an 'A'"	Kris Sherwood	Alex Almaguer	Alex Almaguer	March 2, 2007	TBA
When Billy fails an important test, the result of which will go into his permanent record, he asks Grim to magically alter his grade from an "F" to an "A"; as Grim reluctantly changes the grade, Billy becomes a genius, but reality is thrown completely off balance. Mandy and Grim go back in time to stop the past Grim from helping Billy, but it does not work. They keep going back in time to different epochs, each time meeting another Grim, eventually trying to stop Billy's ancestors from conceiving him, but nothing works. After meeting Billy's distant dinosaur relative, the episode ends abruptly as Grim wonders what the end of this could be.
68b	3b	"Yeti or Not, Here I Come"	Matt Engstrom	Chris Headrick	Chris Headrick	March 2, 2007	TBA
After watching the Unsolvable Mysteries TV show (a parody of Unsolved Mysteries), Grim realizes he forgot a million years ago to reap the Abominable Snowman living in the Himalayas. Billy, Mandy, and Grim go there to finish the job and also to obtain videographic proof of the snowman's existence. The Yeti, who likes to be called Abom, manages to escape Grim more than once before finally being trapped by the moving glacier. Grim watches the TV show again, but he may have forgotten to reap the Loch Ness Monster too.
69a	4a	"Nergal's Pizza"	Gordon Kent	Mike Diederich	Mike Diederich	March 9, 2007	TBA
When Nergal comes to tell the guys about his new pizza joint, Grim thinks he can do better by using his Granny's recipe. A pizza war ensues between Nergal's Pizza and Grim's Pizza, with each pizzeria launching TV ads and discrediting each other. Nergal Jr. uses his shape-shifting abilities to infiltrate Grim's pizza and replace Granny Grim's hot sauce with a "ghastly elixir". The result is pizzas becoming monsters and attacking the city, and the citizens developing parasites similar to Nergal. Nergal and his family leave the city just as Grim's sauce explodes.
69b	4b	"Hey, Water You Doing?"	Kris Sherwood	Ian Wasseluk	Ian Wasseluk	March 9, 2007	TBA
After Billy, Mandy, and Grim are disappointed with the SassyCat amusement park submarine attraction, Grim uses his powers to take them to the bottom of the ocean to have a real magical adventure. They are sentenced to death for trespassing into the Googen Kingdom by King Triceps, a wrestling merman. The king's daughter, Hariel, also a mermaid, stops the sacrifice and tries to marry Billy to inherit the kingdom. It is revealed that King Triceps is actually Hariel's sister, the sea witch Uvula, who also tries inherit the kingdom. A cat fight ensues between the two ladies, which ends when Billy agrees to marry both of them. The plot is revealed to be a story Billy is telling to Miss Butterbean, who initially asked him what happened to his report.
70a	5a	"Company Halt"	Kris Sherwood	Maxwell Atoms and Alex Almaguer	Alex Almaguer	March 16, 2007	TBA
As Billy annoys General Skarr, Hector Con Carne and Major Dr. Ghastly arrive to lure him back into the recently relaunched Evil Con Carne world domination organization. Although initially refusing to rejoin, Skarr later accepts with the condition that Billy and the other neighbors be destroyed. After a few weeks of living together and preparations, Evil Con Carne's ultimate weapon is revealed to be an army of tanks that shoot giant rubber bands. Skarr's all-out attack over the neighborhood is foiled when Billy tricks Hector into shooting Skarr's garden and they get into a fight.
70b	5b	"Anger Mismanagement"	Matt Engstrom, Gordon Kent, and Russell Calabrese	Chris Headrick and Stephen DeStefano	Stephen DeStefano	March 16, 2007	TBA
As General Skarr has trouble finding a job, the recruiter tells him to attend anger management classes if he wants to work again. Skarr finds out Mandy and Grim are attending too, Mandy for staring at the school monitor, and Grim for enjoying his job too much. The instructor of the class, Larry, turns out to be a peace-loving, short man riding a tricycle, who teaches the trio ways to calm down when angered, including counting to ten, and using harmless weapons to let go of their anger. Larry invites Billy to the class, and Mandy, Grim, and Skarr all manage to contain themselves; however after getting their diplomas from his van, Larry himself suffers an episode of rage when his parking space gets ruined by a man (who has a burger for a head) then later attacks him, he gets arrested by the police (who also have burger heads) which makes him lose his keys, resulting Mandy, Grim, and Skarr taking his van for a test drive.
71a	6a	"Waking Nightmare"	Juli Hashiguchi and Gordon Kent	Maxwell Atoms and Aaron Springer	Aaron Springer	March 23, 2007	TBA
When Mandy finds Billy playing with Grim's gigantic dog, Cerberus, she tells Grim to keep Billy under tight control because she needs a good night of sleep to be ready for the next day's test. With a little persuasion from his own dad, Billy tries to wake up Mandy at night, so she will fail the test and he can score higher than her for the first time. After Grim spends the night guarding Mandy's house from Billy, the latter succeeds in waking up Mandy. It is revealed that this Mandy is in fact Irwin, used as a decoy by the real Mandy, who slept in her dog's house. Mandy passes the test, and Grim is punished for not guarding her properly.
71b	6b	"Beware of the Undertoad"	Matt Engstrom, Juli Hashiguchi, Eddy Houchins, and Kris Sherwood	Michael Diederich	Michael Diederich	March 23, 2007	TBA
When Billy, Mandy, and Grim once again go to the beach, Grim warns Billy to avoid swimming too far, because the "undertoad", a frog-like creature, will try to drag him into the sea. Billy encounters the undertoad, and he barely makes it back to the beach. With the dangers of the sea averted, the guys go back home, but the undertoad is set on bringing Billy down, that he follows him to his house. The next day, the undertoad becomes a constant annoyance to Billy, even at school. Grim and Mandy capture the undertoad, and set sail to release him at sea, where they meet the giant Mama undertoad.
72a	7a	"The Greatest Love Story Ever Told Ever"	Gordon Kent and Kris Sherwood	C. H. Greenblatt	C. H. Greenblatt	April 6, 2007	TBA
When Irwin lacks the courage to ask Mandy to go with him to the Valentine's Day school dance, he tells Nergal Jr. to do it for him. Mandy mistakes Junior's invitation for his own, and surprisingly accepts to go with him, which naturally makes Irwin jealous. With the ill advice received from his father to be possessive with Mandy, Junior eventually becomes overprotective of her and begins to fight Irwin. It is revealed that this was Mandy's true intention all along so that no one could enjoy Valentine's Day.
72b	7b	"Detention X"	Shaun Cashman, Matt Engstrom, and Eddy Houchins	Jeremy Bargiel and Ian Wasseluk	Ian Wasseluk	April 6, 2007	TBA
When Billy accidentally poisons Miss Butterbean, Principal Goodvibes offers Grim the job of substitute teacher, which Grim accepts as now Billy and Mandy have to obey him. Grim sends misbehaving students to the "Detention Dimension", a place of eternal punishment, until only Mandy remains in his class. Grim tricks Mandy into opening a portal and she is dragged into the dimension too. Mandy proves to be more terrifying than Miss Slither, the snake-like creature in charge of the Detention Dimension, that Mandy escapes the place and takes revenge on Grim by sending him there too.
73 74	8 9	"Wrath of the Spider Queen"	Matt Engstrom, Gordon Kent, Kris Sherwood, and Juli Hashiguchi	Maxwell Atoms	Chris Headrick, Clay Morrow, Alex Almaguer, and Mike Diederich	July 6, 2007	TBA
On a rainy day, giant spiders appear in Billy and Mandy's school and start kidnapping the children one by one. Grim presumes this is somehow related to his past, but does not figure it out until he receives a message saying that Velma, the Spider Queen, an old good friend from high school, is responsible for it. Meanwhile, Billy meets with Jeff the Spider, who informs him that he is precisely marrying Velma. After trying to recover a talking carton of chocolate milk from Jeff, Billy and Jeff get into a fight, and Jeff looks angrier than ever before. Upon meeting in the school's football field, Velma tells Grim that she has finally come to devour his skull and absorb his magical and supernatural powers, since one hundred thousand years ago, Grim had cheated and robbed her from the possibility of becoming the Reaper in a scare election. Converting the school into her own palace, and with help from the Dark Elves, Velma kidnaps Mandy, Mindy, and Grim, and proceeds to devour the latter's skull. When Velma cracks open Grim's skull, his thoughts start coming out in the form of light blue light, and she sees his past memories. Grim's skull is connected to a projection screen, and the story on how he became the Reaper is shown. It is revealed that an election was held in the Underworld's high school to choose the Reaper, in which students had to vote on the scariest participant. Velma was the scariest contestant and she received more votes than the pathetic Grim and the Boogeyman. Boogey decided to tamper with the ballots, and Grim in turn decided to help Velma by filling the ballot with votes for her, but she got the impression that Grim was the cheater and ran away. In a fit of anger for what Boogey had caused, Grim used the prototype scythe to scare Boogey off. The people that had not yet cast their vote voted for Grim, who became the new Reaper. While the story is being told, Mandy and Mindy form a temporary alliance to fight the spiders, and also Billy conquers his arachnophobia, and fights the spider-cow centaur-like extraterrestrial from the milk carton. Velma realizes she was wrong, with respect to Grim, and she apologizes for the whole vengeful ordeal. After the wedding ceremony, Billy suddenly realizes Velma is a spider, and forbids Jeff from marrying her. With no wedding and no revenge, Velma decides to go ahead and conquer Earth, as her parents wanted.
75a	10a	"El Dia De Los Muertos Estupidos"	Matt Engstrom	Nina Bargiel, Jeremy Bargiel, Jay Baker, and Maxwell Atoms	Jay Baker	November 9, 2007	TBA
When Billy's dad drives Billy, Mandy, and Grim to the hamburger restaurant, they somehow end up in Mexico. There, the people are celebrating Dia de los Muertos, but local kids say it may be the last celebration ever, because Del Uglio, a masked and ugly luchador, is set on stealing the "Golden Nose of Chipotle", a prehispanic relic on which the festivity is based. To get to the nose, Del Uglio has one half of the map, while the other half is held by his lost twin brother, who turns out to be Billy. Grim defeats Del Uglio, but it is Mandy who keeps the golden nose for herself, which makes her rich.
75b	10b	"Heartburn"	Kris Sherwood	Nina Bargiel, Jeremy Bargiel, and Chris Mitchell	Chris Mitchell	November 9, 2007	TBA
When Billy starts taking pictures with a camera found in Grim's trunk, Grim tells him that is an Underworld's True-heart Camera, which shows the real essence of a person's heart. When Mandy takes Irwin's picture, it is revealed that he is actually half-good and half-evil. Irwin explains that although he was born evil, his dad taught him about love and respect, and he had a change of heart. Upon knowing this, and against her own wishes, Mandy also experiences a painful change, turning good and kind-hearted. Mandy and Irwin finally share a romantic kiss in this episode, but it makes Mandy revert to her old dark and sinister self, which was Irwin's true intention, as he likes her just the way she is.
76a	11a	"Dracula Must Die!"	Juli Hashiguchi and Eddy Houchins	C. H. Greenblatt	C. H. Greenblatt	September 21, 2007	TBA
When renowned vampire hunter Lionel Van Helsing prepares to kill Dracula, Billy, Mandy, and Grim arrive to stop him since Dracula is just senile and harmless. Van Helsing reveals the source of his hatred: in the past, he and Dracula were "best friends forever" by giving each other friendship bracelets, until Dracula used his irresistible dance moves to marry Tanya, the mortal woman of his dreams. Tanya arrives too, revealing that she is none other than Irwin's paternal grandmother, making Irwin one-quarter vampire on his father's side, and half-mummy from his mother and her relatives. Van Helsing leaves, but Dracula is unsatisfied with his newfound family of nerds; namely his grownup vampire/human son and young hybrid grandson.
76b	11b	"Short Tall Tales"	Russell Calabrese	Maxwell Atoms, Nina Bargiel, and Jeremy Bargiel	Clay Morrow	September 21, 2007	TBA
As Billy, Mandy, and Irwin need to write a school report on tall tales, Grim tells outrageous tall tales about Pecos Billy (based on Pecos Bill), Paula Bunyan (based on Paul Bunyan), and John Henry. In Grim's stories, Pecos Billy (Billy) saves an Arizona trailer park from a tornado using a laser-shooting cow-like spacecraft; Paula Bunyan (Mandy) uses her blue ox companion, Babe, to stomp over a villain, creating the Grand Canyon in the process; John Henry (Irwin) digs through a tunnel so fast that he breaks the laws of physics and bursts into the "eighth dimension". After Grim tells them the stories, Mandy informs Billy and Irwin that he is trying to get them F's.
77a	12a	"Nigel Planter and the Order of the Peanuts"	Matt Engstrom	Tim McKeon	Chris Headrick	September 28, 2007	TBA
When Billy, Mandy, and Grim go to a joke shop, they find the owner is former boy wizard Nigel Planter, who reveals that his powers diminished and was kicked out of Toadblatt's School of Sorcery. Planter steals Grim's scythe and heads to the school to exact revenge on those who wronged him. The guys seek the help of Planter's sworn enemy, Lord Moldybutt, to find the school. Grim recovers his scythe, and Moldybutt turns out to be a real estate agent, who informs Planter that he is the heir to the "Peanuts by Planter" farming company.
77b	12b	"The Incredible Shrinking Mandy"	Russell Calabrese and Eddy Houchins	Jeremy Bargiel and Nina Bargiel	Jim Schumann	September 28, 2007	TBA
When Grim cannot take any more abuse from Mandy, Billy tries using Grim's scythe to shrink her to mouse size. Instead of shrinking, Mandy becomes a giant and destroys Billy's house. Although Mandy enjoys being a giant for a while, there are inconveniences, as she keeps growing as time passes, and she wants to return to her normal size. Billy is the only one who can cancel the curse he put on Mandy, and he refuses to do so. Mandy grows bigger than the planet, and she finds herself in the "Realm of the Infinite" with other creatures that grow at infinite pace. Mandy starts bossing them around to please her.
78	13	"Billy & Mandy Moon the Moon"	Juli Hashiguchi, Kris Sherwood, and Russell Calabrese	Maxwell Atoms, Nina Bargiel, and Jeremy Bargiel	Maxwell Atoms	May 28, 2007	TBA
When Billy is sent to bed after playing with his Dr. Brainiac action figure, he wishes he had an adventure. He notices a strange light outside and wanders into a corn field to investigate; he encounters Sperg, and both of them are caught in a UFO's tractor beam. Inside, the aliens decide to experiment on them. When they return home, it is revealed that Sperg has a bomb implanted in his head, and also that there is a shortage of dairy products; Billy explains that the aliens are stealing Earth's dairy products because they are werewolf-like creatures who need cheese, and they have already mined all the cheese in the Moon. Billy's crazy story is confirmed when too many UFOs appear. Billy says they must assemble a team of dairy superheroes, the Green Squeaker (Billy), Milk Mandy, the Cheese Reaper, and Dairy Boy (Sperg), to combat the aliens, but everybody is opposed to the idea. Later, the four of them have been captured and are sent to the Moon to be destroyed, but they escape and try to stop the Moon ship from getting to Earth. The Moon aliens start their transformation into werewolves, and they bite Billy, who becomes a werewolf too. With their backs to the wall, Grim finally chooses to give Billy, Mandy, and himself their dairy superpowers. Meanwhile, Sperg sacrifices himself by letting the bomb in his head explode in the control room, crashing the spaceship in the Moon and saving Earth.

== Special (2005) ==
No.	Title	Directed by	Story by	Storyboarded by	Original release date	Prod. code
S1	Billy & Mandy Save Christmas	Juli Hashiguchi, Shaun Cashman, Sue Perrotto, Robert Hughes, and Russell Calabrese	Maxwell Atoms; Written by: Nina Bargiel and Jeremy Bargiel	C. H. Greenblatt, Shaun Cashman, Debbie Cone, Brett Varon, and Maxwell Atoms	December 2, 2005	TBA
The day before Christmas, Billy, Mandy, and Grim go to the shopping mall, where Mandy complains that Santa Claus is just an invention from corporations. Grim assures Mandy that Santa is real, and that they even went to college together. They decide to travel to the North Pole and meet Santa, but when they arrive Mrs. Claus tells them that Santa Claus has been transformed into a vicious vampire. To save Christmas, Mandy and Grim go to stake the Head Vampire, Baron Von Ghoulish, while Billy remains with Mrs. Claus to look after her. It turns out that the cleaning-obsessed Von Ghoulish is not the vampire they are looking for, so they set out to find the Head Head Vampire. Mandy, Grim, and Von Ghoulish go back to Santa's workshop where it is revealed that Mrs. Claus is the Head Vampire, and transformed Santa to take a break from all her work. Billy finds holographic instructions to bake cookies, which he gives to the vampire Santa Claus, restoring him to normal. Finally, Mrs. Claus and Mandy prepare for a final confrontation, but Santa arrives on time to reconcile with his wife. Santa acknowledges he married his wife even though she was a vampire long before they met, and that she has turned him into a vampire before, but he always manages to recover.

== Films (2007–08) ==
No.	Title	Directed by	Story by	Storyboarded by	Original release date	Prod. code
M1	Billy & Mandy's Big Boogey Adventure	Shaun Cashman, Kris Sherwood, Gordon Kent, Matt Engstrom, Eddy Houchins, Sue Perrotto, Robert Alvarez, Russell Calabrese, Phil Cummings, Mike Lyman, and Christine Kolosov	Maxwell Atoms; Written by: Nina Bargiel, Jeremy Bargiel, and Maxwell Atoms	C. H. Greenblatt, Maxwell Atoms, Michael Diederich, Alex Almaguer, Ian Wasseluk, Tara Nicole Whitaker, Chris Headrick, Jay Baker, John Holmquist, and Spencer Laudiero	March 30, 2007	TBA
A scene of Endsville two weeks into the future shows a dystopian world ruled by the "Lord of Horror", who wields the all-powerful artifact known as "Horror's Hand". At the same time, two robotic replicas of Billy and Mandy are sent into the past, to stop the real Billy and Mandy from interfering with the current events. In the present, Grim goes to reap General Skarr, who accidentally got a big wound in his torso. Due to Billy and Mandy's meddling, Skarr escapes, and they make a big mess in the city. Following his failure to be an effective Reaper, Grim is taken to the Underworld Court, presided by Judge Roy Spleen, where he is sued for misuse of his powers by his nemesis, the Boogeyman. Grim is found guilty, is stripped of his rank and magical scythe, and he, Billy, Mandy, and Irwin are sentenced to be exiled. Boogey volunteers to carry on the sentence by taking the prisoners aboard his ship, and dropping them off in a river of fire; he plans to do this while he sails to obtain Horror's Hand, which will give him unlimited power. The group of Billy, Mandy, Irwin, and the powerless Grim, escapes from Boogey's ship when Billy distracts Boogey and his crew with the song "Scary-o", and set themselves to reach Horror's Hand before Boogey does. They eventually meet Horror, the guardian of the Hand, at the same time Boogey and his crew arrive. To decide who will have the honor to battle Horror for his Hand, the heroes and Boogey participate in a challenging obstacle course, which the heroes win against all odds. After dispatching Horror with ease, Billy, Mandy, and Irwin reach for the Hand, but it defends itself by making their worst nightmares come to life. Boogey gets hold of Horror's Hand, but he turns out to be the least scariest creature ever, seriously injuring himself, and being abandoned by his own crew. Grim recovers Horror's Hand, and at the same time his sentence is revoked, becoming the Reaper once again. The future Billy arrives, telling them Horror's Hand should not fall in the wrong hands, specifically Mandy's as he indirectly reveals that she was the one who used Horror's Hand to rule the world. When they return home, Grim seals Horror's Hand in his bottomless trunk, and the future Billy returns to his own time. The future Billy realizes the situation in his time did not improve, and it is Fred Fredburger who obtained Horror's Hand to rule the world.
M2	Underfist: Halloween Bash	Shaun Cashman	Maxwell Atoms	Maxwell Atoms	October 12, 2008	TBA
Billy, Mandy, and Irwin go trick-or-treating on Halloween, and an evil marshmallow bunny attacks children with chocolate beasts.

== Crossover (2007) ==
Title	Directed by	Story by	Storyboarded by	Original release date	Prod. code
"The Grim Adventures of the KND"	Robert Alvarez and Juli Hashiguchi	Maxwell Warburton (Mr. Warburton) and Mr. Atoms (Maxwell Atoms)	Maurice Fontenot, Jesse Schmal, Alex Almaguer, and Scott "Diggs" Underwood	November 11, 2007	TBA
While Billy's dad is underwear shopping, Billy wears his dad's lucky pants, and accidentally rips them with Grim's scythe. Billy opens the door to his house expecting the Powerpuff Girls but it turns out to be the Sector V operatives. Numbuh 1 disguises as Billy while Billy is taken back to the Deep Sea Lab. Mandy arrives at Billy's house and knows Numbuh 1 is not Billy, and tortures him into revealing the truth. Meanwhile, the Delightful Children from Down the Lane and Billy accidentally fuse with the scythe's power to create the Delightful Reaper. Mandy takes over the KND by fooling Numbuh 362 and the rest of the KND, but Numbuh 5 knows she is not Numbuh 1, but is taken to the med lab. The Delightful Reaper assimilates nearly all of Endsville (including Numbuh 2) and grows more powerful. Numbuh 1 and Grim try to get the KND to see the truth, but are imprisoned. Numbuh 5 escapes and finds Numbuh 1 and Grim. Grim and Numbuh 1 fuse with the Bone of Barnacles and become the Skeleton Samurai. Mandy, in her M.A.N.D.R.O.B.O.T. (Monkeys And Nice Dogs Relax On Bellies Of Turtles), fights the Delightful Reaper, and so does the Skeleton Samurai, but they cannot defeat it. Grim finds out that the pants belong to Billy's dad (which are shown to be immune to lasers, supernatural energies and mustard). Mandy is their only hope to defeat the Reaper, but instead she fuses with the Reaper. Billy's dad takes off the pants, and the Samurai Skeleton destroys the Reaper, freeing all of the assimilated children inside it. Mandy becomes furious with Numbuh 1 and Grim, and escapes to vow revenge. Numbuh 1 is mistaken to be Billy by Billy's dad, who punishes him for ruining his lucky pants, as Billy, on the other hand, disguises as Numbuh 1, causing the KND to throw various objects at him in response to prevent what happened that day.

== Shorts ==
=== Billy's Birthday Shorties (2006) ===
These shorts were parts of a mini-series called Billy's Birthday Shorties, which mostly starred Billy. The shorts revolved around Billy's birthday and aired on "The Grim and Courage Hour", an hour-long block of episodes from The Grim Adventures of Billy & Mandy and Courage the Cowardly Dog. It aired for four days in October 2006 on Cartoon Network.

No.	Title	Original air date
B1	"Super Myron Brothers"	October 23, 2006
Billy looks into Grim's trunk and sees a monster, who he names Myron. But when Billy brings Myron outside to his backyard, he gets eaten.
B2	"Macaroni Man"	October 24, 2006
Billy's Dad has forgotten to buy Billy's present for his birthday again, and every time Billy's Dad buys a present for Billy, he will get distracted by a "Rocket" Kiddie Ride. This time, however, he found a way to give Billy a present that will be "The greatest gift ever, made by the hands of Man." It turns out, however, that Billy's Dad gave Billy a macaroni bike, and that the macaroni Billy's Dad used are the ones supposed to be used for the macaroni salad. The short ends with everyone eating the salad while Grim vomits upon learning the truth of the secret of the macaroni salad (Motor Oil).
B3	"Cake It to the Limit"	October 25, 2006
Grim decides to make a cake for Billy's birthday, but he and Mandy end up making a Devil's Food cake that comes alive and wrecks the kitchen. The cake hops on Grim's face, but Mandy smashes it and splatters it all over the kitchen.
B4	"Makeover the Top"	October 25, 2006
Irwin finishes wrapping Billy's present and buys a huge present for Mandy as well. He decides it is not big enough, however, so his dad decides to teach him how to dance. Irwin writes her a rap and Irwin's dad ends up teaching him how to work out instead of dancing. Irwin shows his moves to Mandy, but Mandy rejects him; Irwin also gets a wedgie from Sperg.
B5	"The Uninvited"	October 26, 2006
Dracula was heading for the bingo hall when he ran into Pud'n who was on his way to Billy's party. Dracula was insulted he was not invited to the party and decides to crash it. Harold will not let him in and accidentally calls him old. Dracula starts dancing and breaks all of his bones, much to Harold's disgust. Harold lets him in so he will stop.
B6	"Death of the Party"	October 26, 2006
Billy blows out the candles off his cake and Dracula turns to leave, but Billy stops him and forces him to stay for games. They play Pictionary where he draws Abraham Lincoln, but no one guesses it. Everyone turns to leave but Billy stops them and forces them to party all night. Billy decides to get a piñata, but the stores are closed so Billy forces them to stay all night until Grim and the others decide to use Billy as a piñata.

=== Irwin Hearts Mandy (2007) ===
On February 14, 2007, four shorts entitled Irwin Hearts Mandy aired.

No.	Title	Airdate
1	"Dream Date"	February 14, 2007
2	"Dracula De Bergerac"	February 14, 2007
3	"Hate in an Elevator"	February 14, 2007
4	"Future Nerd"	February 14, 2007

=== Other shorts (2007) ===
No.	Title	Airdate
1	"Irwin Live!"	August 19, 2007
2	"Fit to Be Tied"	October 1, 2007
3	"Date with Death"	October 2, 2007
4	"Dentally Disturbed"	2007
5	"Room Gloom"	2007
6	"Senior Power"	2007
7	"Frozey the Snowman"	2007
8	"Matinee Mandy"	2007
9	"Wish Unfulfillment"	2007

== See also ==
- List of Grim & Evil episodes
- List of Evil Con Carne episodes
