= Big Flakes =

- The Ren & Stimpy Show episode
- Episode no.: Season 5 Episode 15
- Directed by: Ken Bruce
- Written by: Ron Hauge; Jim Gomez; Bob Camp
- Original air date: November 18, 1995

Episode chronology
← Previous "Sammy and Me"	Next → "Pen Pals"

"Big Flakes" is the fifteenth episode of the fifth season of The Ren & Stimpy Show. It originally aired on Nickelodeon in the United States on November 18, 1995.

== Plot ==
Ren and Stimpy travel to a log cabin Ren's parents had agreed to loan them for the winter. Unbeknownst to them, all of their belongings, save for Stimpy's luggage fall off their car. They reveal the cabin to have what they need: a fireplace for warmth, moose jerky for sustenance and a natural geyser bidet. The duo get to bed, where Stimpy prays for everyone and everything he can, much to Ren's anger; both of their screams cause a gigantic snow structure overlooking their house to fall on them.

The next day, Ren gets Stimpy out to play in the snow, only for it to overflow the house; they are unable to do much due to being trapped in the snow. Ren watches Stimpy display his stupidity, only for it to be charades with the answer being "stupid raving fool". He allows Stimpy to light the fireplace, with the resulting flame impressing him despite burning Stimpy; this does not last long as Stimpy reveals he burnt the moose jerky for the fire, making Ren extremely outraged.

Ten months pass as they sustain on the calendar's pages with shaving cream while growing beards. More time passes as Ren starts to hallucinate from claustrophobia and malnutrition, with Stimpy using up his fat supply and becoming thin; Ren harasses Stimpy with his irrational fear of long words. Suddenly, the doorbell rings with a man delivering pizzas; despite the sight of actual food, Stimpy refuses the pizzas, with the man realizing he was at the wrong house as his clients are a music band. This is not a hallucination as the snow does fall after a tractor with the band passes by.

Months pass by again as the duo hallucinate even farther, confusing the logs used for the cabin and nails for chocolate and peanut brittle. They presumably die of starvation in the house while they remain snowed in, despite the summer weather melting it all around the cabin. Outside people enjoy the heat, oblivious of the snow-covered cabin nearby and ending the episode.

== Cast ==
- Billy West as Ren, Stimpy and pizza delivery guy

== Production ==
"Big Flakes" was produced as part of the series' fourth season and aired during a Nickelodeon-"commissioned" fifth season. Dan Povenmire and Jeff "Swampy" Marsh, at the time major crew members of Rocko's Modern Life and future co-creators of Phineas and Ferb, contributed to storyboards alongside Mark Marren (credited as Kirk Field) and Louie del Carmen, with Tom McGrath, future director of DreamWorks films Madagascar, Megamind, and The Boss Baby, being the main contributor. Animation was provided by Mr. Big Cartoons.

For its DVD release, the commentary was provided for comedic effect by its characters Ren (voiced by John Kricfalusi) and Stimpy (voiced by Eric Bauza), rather than the actual cast and crew.

== Reception ==
American journalist Thad Komorowski gave the episode three out of five stars, noting that it failed to deliver on its strong premise.

== Books and articles ==
- Dobbs, G. Michael (2015). Escape – How Animation Broke into the Mainstream in the 1990s. Orlando: BearManor Media. ISBN 978-1593931100.
- Komorowski, Thad (2017). Sick Little Monkeys: The Unauthorized Ren & Stimpy Story. Albany, Georgia: BearManor Media. ISBN 978-1629331836.
