= Louie del Carmen =

American animator and storyboard artist

- Born: Manuel Luis Gonzales del Carmen; Cavite City, Philippines
- Occupations: Animator, storyboard artist, director, illustrator
- Years active: 1995–present
- Employer(s): Nickelodeon Animation Studio (1995–2009); Disney Television Animation (2000–2011); Warner Bros. Animation (2001–2006); 20th Century Fox Animation (2004–2007); Cartoon Network Studios (2005–2012); DreamWorks Animation (2007–2013); Sony Pictures Animation (2013–2022); Skydance Animation (2021–present)
- Relatives: Ronnie del Carmen (brother)
- Website: louiedelcarmen.com

Manuel Luis Gonzales del Carmen, known professionally as Louie del Carmen, is an American animator, storyboard artist, director, and illustrator.

== Career ==
Born in Cavite City, Philippines, he would then move to Los Angeles, California and begin his animation work in 1995. He first worked at Games Animation for the series The Ren & Stimpy Show as a freelance storyboard artist for one episode, "Big Flakes". He would then work on animated series like Rugrats, Rocket Power, Invader Zim, The Grim Adventures of Billy & Mandy, Kim Possible, Drawn Together, American Dragon: Jake Long, The Mighty B!, and Phineas and Ferb. In 2004, he worked as a story artist at 20th Century Fox Animation for the 2006 film, Ice Age: The Meltdown. In 2007, he would continue his position as story artist by working at DreamWorks Animation on some of their notable and successful projects like the first two Kung Fu Panda films, How to Train Your Dragon and its TV shows, Megamind and The Croods.

In 2006, he self-published his first book titled Random Anomalies, a collection of editorial-style cartoons dealing with the subject of fate and synchronicity. Honoring his art heroes, he followed Random Anomalies with the science fiction themed art book The Wayward Traveller: Snapshots from Alternate Worlds. In The Wayward Traveller he cites such artists as Jean Giraud (Moebius), Syd Mead, and Katsuhiro Otomo as strong influences in his work. As a follow-up to The Wayward Traveller he released Alternating Currents in the summer of 2008, featuring an all new line up of science fiction illustrations.

Staying in sci-fi genre, del Carmen released his first self-published comic book in 2007 called Steel Noodles: A Slice of Heaven featuring an orange-haired, waif warrior named Val. The short, independently printed book served as a preview to a much larger story which he has developed into a multi-part graphic novel, starting with Steel Noodles Number 1 which debuted at San Diego Comic-Con in July 2010.

== Personal life ==
Del Carmen also has two brothers that work in animation; Ronnie is a story artist, designer, illustrator and film director at Pixar, while Rick (Enrique) works as a storyboard artist and assistant director at 20th Century Animation.

== Filmography ==
=== Television ===
Year	Title	Notes
1995	The Ren & Stimpy Show	additional storyboard design, Episode: "Big Flakes"
1995–1997	Aaahh!!! Real Monsters	character design
1997–2001	Rugrats	character design/director
1998–2000	The Angry Beavers	character design
1999	Dilbert	character design
1999	The New Woody Woodpecker Show	assistant storyboard artist
1999–2001	Rocket Power	storyboard artist/director
2000	Clerks: The Animated Series	storyboard artist
2001	The Oblongs	character design/storyboard artist
2001–2002	Invader Zim	storyboard supervisor
2002–2006	Kim Possible	storyboard artist
2002	3-South	storyboard artist
2003	He-Man and the Masters of the Universe	storyboard artist
2005	Lilo & Stitch: The Series	storyboard artist
2005	The Grim Adventures of Billy & Mandy	storyboard artist
2005–2006	Drawn Together	storyboard artist
2005–2006	Loonatics Unleashed	storyboard artist
2005–2006	The X's	storyboard artist
2005–2007	American Dragon: Jake Long	storyboard artist
2007–2008	The Emperor's New School	storyboard artist
2008–2009	The Mighty B!	storyboard supervisor
2009–2010	Phineas and Ferb	storyboard supervisor
2010–2012	The Cleveland Show	storyboard supervisor
2011–2012	Regular Show	storyboard supervisor
2012	Dragons: Riders of Berk	series director
2013	Dragons: Defenders of Berk	series director

=== Feature film ===
Year	Title	Notes
1998	The Rugrats Movie	character designer
2000	Rugrats in Paris: The Movie	character designer
2002	The Wild Thornberrys Movie	character designer
2003	Rugrats Go Wild	character designer
2004	Scooby-Doo! and the Loch Ness Monster	storyboard artist
2005	American Dad!: Inside the CIA	storyboard supervisor
2006	Ice Age: The Meltdown	story artist
2007	Futurama: Bender's Big Score	storyboard supervisor
2007	Everybody Loves Hypnotoad: Amazon Adventure	storyboard supervisor
2008	Justice League: The New Frontier	storyboard artist
2008	Kung Fu Panda	story artist
2009	The Haunted World of El Superbeasto	storyboard supervisor
2010	How to Train Your Dragon	story artist
2010	Megamind	story artist
2011	Kung Fu Panda 2	story artist
2011	Phineas and Ferb the Movie: Across the 2nd Dimension	storyboard supervisor
2012	Rise of the Guardians	story artist
2013	The Croods	story artist
2017	The Star	storyboard artist
2017	Captain Underpants: The First Epic Movie	story artist
2018	Spider-Man: Into the Spider-Verse	story artist
2019	Abominable	story artist
2019	Frozen II	storyboard artist
2022	Luck	story artist
2024	Spellbound	story artist
TBA	Cosmic Motors †	co-director

=== Web/internet ===
Year	Title	Notes
2007	Revisioned: Tomb Raider	Art direction/design, Episode: "Rising Thaumopolis"

== Bibliography ==
- Rugrats: Pizza Cats (1999 - ISBN 0-689-82391-6) Simon & Schuster
- Rugrats: Oh Brother! (1999 - ISBN 0-689-82440-8) Simon & Schuster
- Rugrats: Be My Valentine (2000 - ISBN 0-689-83065-3) Simon & Schuster
- Random Anomalies (2006) self-published
- The Wayward Traveller: Snapshots from Alternate Worlds (2006) self-published
- The Call (2007) (Hot Mexican Love Comics) (Independently published Anthology)
- Subway Sketches (2007) (Art Compilation) (Imaginism Books, Toronto Canada)
- Swallow 3 (2007) (Art Compilation) (IDW Publishing)
- Dragon Sketches (2007) (Art Compilation) (Imaginism Books, Toronto Canada)
- Steel Noodles: A Slice of Heaven (2007) self-published
- Muerto Mambo (2008) (Hot Mexican Love Comics) (Independently published Anthology)
- Alternating Currents (2008) self-published
- DRAWING INSPIRATION: The Visual Artist at Work (2010) (Delmar Cengage Learning) ISBN 978-1-4180-5225-6
- Steel Noodles Number 1 (2010) self-published ISBN 978-0-9827706-0-3
- Girl n Robot: Boomtown (2011) self-published
- Steel Noodles Number 2 (2012) self-published ISBN 978-0-9827706-1-0
- MUSE Volume 1 (2013) self-published ISBN 978-0-9827706-2-7
