= Out West (The Ren & Stimpy Show) =

- The Ren & Stimpy Show episode
- Episode no.: Season 2 Episode 4b
- Directed by: Bob Camp
- Written by: John Kricfalusi; Bob Camp
- Production code: RS5-4B
- Original air date: August 29, 1992

Episode chronology
| ← Previous "Man's Best Friend" | Next → "Rubber Nipple Salesmen" |

"Out West" is the fourth episode of the second season of The Ren & Stimpy Show. It originally aired on Nickelodeon in the United States on August 29, 1992.

== Plot ==
In a remote town in the American Southwest, some time in the 19th century, the law is represented by two stereotypical hillbilly "yahoos": the brutalist, ignorant, moronic Sheriff Abner Dimwit and his equally asinine and vicious Deputy Sheriff, Ewalt Nitwit. Both have sadistic pleasure in hanging people, and they had hanged everyone else in the town to death for pleasure; they decide to hang villains, despite not having any idea what it means. Bored as there is no one available to hang, the duo are delighted when two outlaws, Ren (a.k.a. Three-Fingered Höek) and his sidekick Stimpy (a.k.a. Stupid the Kid) arrive in their town; they intend to steal from the townsfolk under the pretense of odd jobs.

The duo claims to be the villains the sheriffs are looking for, who then order them to steal Abner's horse; they end up stealing Abner's wife after an apparent struggle. They also steal Mr. Horse (Abner's horse), who is unnerved by the sheriffs' inability to recognize the duo as horse thieves.

Eventually, the sheriffs realize they finally got villains to hang, and they attempt to hang Ren and Stimpy to no avail; Ren is too light while Stimpy is too fat to fit into the noose. The sheriffs decide to hang each other, which prompts Ren and Stimpy to break into song about the joys of hanging with them; they slowly suffocate to death while Ren and Stimpy watch in glee.

== Cast ==
- John Kricfalusi as Ren (original), and Mr. Horse
- Billy West as Ren (redubbed), and Stimpy
- Jim Smith as Abner Dimwit
- Bob Camp as Ewalt Nitwit

== Production ==
The episode was approved by Nickelodeon in November 1991, with a premiere set for August 1992. Bob Camp, director of the episode, later complained about the network censorship as there were scenes "cut out for one reason or another and we had had to make last-minute substitutions so it wasn't quite as funny". Production at Spümcø was divided between the prestigious "A" productions directed personally by showrunner John Kricfalusi, which received more time and larger budgets, vs. the less prestigious "B" productions directed by Bob Camp, which received less time and lower budgets. For the second season, "Out West", along with "In the Army", "Mad Dog Höek" and "Monkey See, Monkey Don't!", were the lesser "B" productions assigned to Camp. Kricfalusi co-wrote the story for "Out West" along with Camp, but was not especially involved in its production. Unlike the "A" productions headed by the perfectionist Kricfalusi, the "B" productions headed by Camp moved forward at a swifter pace and were completed on time. Camp stated he saved time because "I storyboarded straight ahead, full size on layout paper, that's doing layout and storyboard at the same. Someone would take all the scenes and make a storyboard out of it, and we would do layout". "Out West" came in slightly under budget owing to Camp's production methods. The network rules forbade the characters from drinking alcohol, but in "Out West" there were numerous corks in the background, which suggests that the inability of Abner and Ewalt to understand even the simplest of concepts was due not only to their stupidity, but also because they were drunk as well.

The process of drawing in the scenes for the episode was done at Carbunkle Cartoons at Vancouver in the spring of 1992. Kricfalusi would preferred to have the work sub-contracted out to a cheap studio in Asia (i.e. Rough Draft Korea in Seoul), but begrudgingly allowed this, as the studio needed work while "Svën Höek" was still in development. Studio head Bob Jaques directed the animation, and he was provided unusually high creative freedom as Kricfalusi was too occupied to exert control on the episode while neglecting to limit the episode's budget. Chris Sauvé stated about the scene he illustrated of Ren and Stimpy riding into town on giant chickens: "It was the only scene I ever did on Ren & Stimpy where I actually did a live-action reference. I went with some kid's movie, The Adventures of Milo and Otis, and I still-framed this scene of all these chickens. I was just amazed at how fast those chickens moved their heads. It was basically popping from pose to pose: if it wasn't it was one frame held and then that flappy thing underneath would move". When it aired in 1992, Nickelodeon censored the scene where Abner and Ewalt placed the nooses around their necks along with Ewalt's line "Y'all bring the kids next time, ya hear!" as it encouraged children to self-harm by hanging.

== Reception ==
American journalist Thad Komorowski gave the episode four-and-a-half out of five stars; he criticized "Out West" for its "peculiarly sluggish pacing" as he complained that there were too many scenes meant to establish the stupidity of Abner and Ewalt that consisted of them staring blankly into space as they struggled to understand the simplest of concepts that were severely "taxing" for the audience. However, Komorowski praised the vibrant animation, as Carbunkle's expertise matched with Bob Camp's raucous animation style, allowing a stale and unoriginal story to be expanded to an outrageous and fun episode. He also noted that the ending as "the willful and blatant shattering of every taboo" that "marks one of the defining moments of the series". Most notably, the song "The Lord Loves a Hanging, That's Why He Gave Us Necks" invokes traditional American values and Christianity in support of capital punishment. However, the song is being ironical in its nominal pro-death penalty stance as the song is told from the viewpoint of someone who gratuitously wants to see people hanged merely for the sadistic pleasure of watching someone die, which undermines the pro-capital punishment message. The ending of "Out West" was banned in the United Kingdom by the British Board of Film Classification under the grounds that "the subject of hanging is presented as comedic, fun and risk-free, on the grounds of potential harm to the likely audience and in accordance with the Video Recordings Act 1984".

== Books ==
- Dobbs, G. Michael (2015). Escape – How Animation Broke into the Mainstream in the 1990s. Orlando: BearManor Media. ISBN 978-1593931100.
- Komorowski, Thad (2017). Sick Little Monkeys: The Unauthorized Ren & Stimpy Story. BearManor Media.
