= Svën Höek =

Svën Höek may refer to:

- Svën Höek (The Ren & Stimpy Show character)
- Svën Höek (The Ren & Stimpy Show episode)
