= My Shiny Friend =

- The Ren & Stimpy Show episode
- Episode no.: Season 4 Episode 19
- Directed by: Bill Wray; Steve Loter (uncredited)
- Written by: Ron Hauge; Jim Gomez; Bill Wray; Bob Camp
- Production code: RS-413
- Original air date: January 21, 1995

Episode chronology
← Previous "Insomniac Ren"	Next → "Cheese Rush Days"

"My Shiny Friend" is the nineteenth episode of the fourth season of The Ren & Stimpy Show. It originally aired on Nickelodeon in the United States on January 21, 1995.

== Plot ==
Ren and Stimpy own a well-off house, as Ren acquired a high-paying job. Stimpy had fostered an addiction to television, as he spends all his free time with it watching The Muddy Mudskipper Show. He remembers every line of every episode of the series, especially one where Mr. Horse co-stars and is hit by Muddy Mudskipper with a mallet in a non-existent attempt to produce comedy. Stimpy neglects his usual responsibilities of housekeeping and cooking meals while doing so, still watching when Ren returns home and expects dinner. Stimpy remembers this task when a cooking show airs, so he cooks roast chicken while watching the show, a beheaded chicken cooking itself, causing a massive fire. The Fire Chief and his lackeys are summoned, stepping on Ren while they put out the fire. They proceed to watch television with Stimpy in a similarly addicted way, annoying Ren as they eat his chicken. At night, Ren finds Stimpy sleeping with his television, with Stimpy selfishly offering him a bed in a shelf; Ren angrily tosses them aside and sleeps peacefully.

The next day, Ren finds Stimpy watching unintelligible gibberish on the television, prompting him to kick him out so he can interact with his animal friends. To his disappointment, Stimpy watches television with his friends, two baby birds and a cow on a bird nest. To their chagrin, Ren buries the television underground, but Stimpy manages to dig underground and watch it with a mole. Ren notices when its antenna pokes above ground, so he decides to end everything by destroying the television with a shovel. Stimpy is mentally broken, in vehemently denial of the television's destruction, but seemingly returns to normal.

At night, Ren reads a newspaper while Stimpy does nothing. He goes to the toilet twice for long periods of time, but Ren does not notice due to the hiatus being acceptably long. He realizes something is wrong when Stimpy tries to do a "number three", which is not a euphemism for going to the toilet, and finds Stimpy having somehow repaired the television, hid it in the toilet and watches it; the television remains operation despite being submerged in water. Ren finally breaks down the door when Stimpy collapses from exhaustion, in what he attributes to an "overdose".

Ren locks Stimpy in the basement, where he is surely isolated from television, while he listens to opera music and reads poetry at his well-endowed living room. Stimpy, suffering from withdrawal syndrome, envisions himself in the Muddy Mudskipper episode where Muddy hits him with the mallet. Muddy transforms into a monstrous television and eats him, waking him up; he tries to escape the basement to no avail and begs God for his television.

One year later, Ren goes off to work while releasing Stimpy from sleeping in the basement, to which he reacts with joy. He immediately welcomes his animal friends, where they play craps in Ren's absence. Having acquired a gambling addiction off-screen, Stimpy loses money as the episode ends.

== Cast ==
- Billy West as Ren, Stimpy, and Mr. Horse
- Harris Peet as Muddy Mudskipper and Fire Chief

== Production ==
"My Shiny Friend" is, to date, the only episode directed by Wray not animated at Mr. Big Cartoons in Sydney, Australia, but instead animated over at Toon-Us-In in Los Angeles. Steve Loter assisted with direction, approving Wray's layouts with characters and backgrounds as his episodes suffered from a lack of rational thought and logic in place of artistic brilliance, with Loter's directorial skills circumventing his problems. Loter was ultimately left uncredited in the final product of the episode, despite attributing most of his contributions.

== Reception ==
American journalist Thad Komorowski gave the episode four out of five stars, noting that it succeeds by showing Stimpy's deterioration through Wray's stylized paintings, while not going in the extremes of Stimpy's addiction, which plagued his other episodes such as "Aloha Höek" and "Sammy and Me".

== Books and articles ==
- Dobbs, G. Michael (2015). Escape – How Animation Broke into the Mainstream in the 1990s. Orlando: BearManor Media. ISBN 978-1593931100.
- Komorowski, Thad (2017). Sick Little Monkeys: The Unauthorized Ren & Stimpy Story. Albany, Georgia: BearManor Media. ISBN 978-1629331836.
