= Big Baby Scam =

- The Ren & Stimpy Show episode
- Episode no.: Season 2 Episode 5b
- Directed by: Vincent Waller
- Written by: Vincent Waller
- Production code: RS5-9B
- Original air date: December 12, 1992

Episode chronology
← Previous "Mad Dog Höek"	Next → "Dog Show"

"Big Baby Scam" is the ninth episode of the second season of The Ren & Stimpy Show. It originally aired on Nickelodeon in the United States on December 12, 1992.

== Plot ==
Ren and Stimpy are once again homeless and starving, eating bark on top of a tree. Upon seeing two twin babies, Eugene and Shawn, in the Pipe family's residence, Ren finds an opportunity, as the life of a baby is apparently pampered and easy. Ren and Stimpy bribe the twin babies, revealed to be fully articulate and act like gangsters, with his savings of $50, in order to take their places; they gladly oblige. The mother of the twins, Mrs. Pipe, checks on the "twins", apparently unable to identify the imposters from her children. She is disappointed by Ren's lack of defecation, while Stimpy manages to fill multiple diapers and is praised. Stimpy is whacked for getting more attention.

A bored Ren breaks a teddy bear and spits on it, only to hear the return of Mr. Pipe, still wearing the rubber nipples they had sold them. He is unable to identify the imposters from his children either. Mrs. Pipe notes that he apparently resembles Stimpy. He punches Ren lightly in amusement, but Ren does not punch back as he does not understand the situation. He mentions his father and the twins' grandfather, which she immediately demands not to mention; he also pulls Ren into his face, tickling Ren with his shaved beard.

Mr. Pipe demands the "twins" learn how to walk, much to their "horror" while hiding under Mrs. Pipe's skirt. Ren tries to teeter forward in an imbalanced way resembling an actual baby, while Stimpy stumbles forward; Mrs. Pipe compliments their "learning ability". Mr. Pipe wants the duo to try walking on a patch of magma under the sofa, which Mrs. Pipe considers to be too "advanced" for the "twins"; Mr. Pipe relents, instead throwing Ren so hard he sticks on the ceiling.

The family have their family bath, with the couple sitting with Ren and Stimpy in a big bathtub. Suddenly, a policeman comes to the residence to return their children, which Mr. Pipe attends to while naked. It is revealed that Mr. Pipe's father is Old Man Hunger, compelling Ren and Stimpy to escape. They do not get recognized or receive consequences for their actions, but Ren is pummeled 50 times in the chest after demanding his money back from the twins.

== Cast ==
- Ren – voice of Billy West
- Stimpy – voice of Billy West
- Mrs. Pipe – voice of Cheryl Chase
- Mr. Pipe – voice of Billy West
- Shawn Pipe – voice of Harris Peet
- The policeman – voice of Billy West
- Eugene Pipe – voice of Harris Peet

== Production ==
The episode was directed by Vincent Waller, who drew the episode largely by himself. Production on "Big Baby Scam" was so troubled and over-budget that the layout stage of production that was normally done at Spümcø in Los Angeles was assigned to Rough Draft Korea in Seoul as a cost-saving measure. Waller went to South Korea to supervise the layout work for this episode and "The Great Outdoors", completing the task in three weeks. During this task, John Kricfalusi was fired alongside Spümcø, with Gregg Vanzo notifying him of this news; he would not return to the series at Games Animation. The episode was heavily censored by Nickelodeon, which removed the scene of the nude "family bath" where Ren stares intendedly at the breasts of Mrs. Pipe along with the scene where Mr. Pipe rubs Ren across his facial stubble.

== Reception ==
British critic Becky Barnicoat wrote that The Ren & Stimpy Show was "confounding" when it first aired in the United Kingdom in 1994 on the BBC, writing it featured a level of violence and vulgarity not seen in any cartoon aired on British television before. Barnicoat used the nude "family bath" scene in "Big Baby Scam" (which was not censored in the United Kingdom) as an example of how revolutionary The Ren & Stimpy Show was, as there had never been a cartoon with scenes such as that aired before. The American critic Shaun Scott praised the episode as a "deeply skeptical look at the price of human life under modern capitalism" as he noted that Mr. Pipe and Mrs. Pipe are so "inattentive" parents that they did not even notice when a dog and a cat replace their sons, while the Pipe boys are portrayed as "money-grubbing thugs who accept a quick pay-off over a lasting relationship with their parents". Thad Komorowski gave the episode four stars out of five.

== Books ==
- Klickstein, Matthew; Summers, Marc (2013). Slimed! An Oral History of Nickelodeon's Golden Age. London: Penguin Publishing Group. ISBN 9781101614099.
- Komorowski, Thad (2017). Sick Little Monkeys: The Unauthorized Ren & Stimpy Story. Albany, Georgia: BearManor Media. ISBN 978-1629331836.
- Scott, Shaun (2018). Millennials and the Moments That Made Us: A Cultural History of the U.S. from 1982–Present. New York: Zero Books. ISBN 178535583X.
