= Ren's Toothache =

- The Ren & Stimpy Show episode
- Episode no.: Season 2 Episode 2a
- Directed by: John Kricfalusi
- Story by: John Kricfalusi; Bob Camp
- Production code: RS5-2A
- Original air date: August 22, 1992

Episode chronology
| ← Previous "Powdered Toast Man" | Next → "Man's Best Friend" |

"Ren's Toothache" is the third episode of the second season of The Ren & Stimpy Show. It originally aired on Nickelodeon in the United States on August 22, 1992. A censored version of "Big House Blues" aired yet again after this episode instead of "Man's Best Friend", which was barred from airing.

== Plot ==
The closeup of Ren's decayed teeth is a notable characteristic of the series' shock value and unsettling surrealism.

One night, Ren and Stimpy prepare for bed; Stimpy brushes his teeth, having improved his own dental hygiene after "The Boy Who Cried Rat!", while Ren goes to sleep directly, being tortured by the apparent noise. Ren chastises Stimpy for wasting his time on his dental hygiene, believing it to be a habit vital for only human children. Stimpy is revealed to have a full set of shining white teeth while Ren's are so deplorable and unhygienic the mirror breaks upon reflecting it.

Ren wakes up in the middle of the night to a painful toothache, which Stimpy explains to be the work of a beaver inside every tooth who attempts to eat his nerve endings. The second night, Ren refuses to brush as usual, only for his teeth to start shattering; he spends the entire night unknowingly grinding his teeth into powder, exposing his nerve endings. The beaver tries to eat the nerve endings but is compelled to leave by Ren's bad breath. Flies on Stimpy's litter box are also repulsed by the smell.

Ren breaks down in tears and asks Stimpy for help, who tells him that the Nerve Ending Fairy gifts hundred-dollar bills in exchange for nerve endings in the manner of the tooth fairy. He does so in painful fashion, and he is visited by the eponymous fairy, who resembles Old Man Hunger. He gifts Ren a ball of lint as he had run out of money.

Ren wakes up on his birthday and is disappointed by the reward. Stimpy surprises Ren with a gift, being his giant incisor. Despite it being apparently too big for Ren to eat, he is grateful for his friend's assistance.

Another fictional advertisement for Log airs midway in the episode, noting how the Log brand had expanded to other products.

== Cast ==
- John Kricfalusi as Ren, Fly #1
- Billy West as Stimpy, Fly #2, Old Man Hunger
- Vincent Waller as Tooth Beaver

== Production ==
John Kricfalusi intended for the episode to be grotesque and unpleasant. It was one of the few episodes from season two and those directed by Kricfalusi to be delivered on time for its scheduled premiere date in August 1992. Rough Draft Korea in Seoul provided animation. Nickelodeon did not censor the episode, but the scene where Stimpy collects his spit into jars was removed in home media.

== Reception ==
Thad Komorowski gave the episode three and a half out of five stars. American critic Hayden Mears wrote: "One of the show's defining elements was its texture. When Ren learns the putrid perils of his unbrushed chompers in 'Ren's Toothache', you smell the stench coming from his mouth. Thanks to some vivid close-ups, you feel a cartoon character's rotting tooth". Likewise, American critic Gary Kramer wrote that "Ren's Toothache", with its close-up shots of Ren's decaying teeth and gums, was a prime example of the show's tendency to focus on the gross and disgusting.

American critic Martin Goodman wrote the Ren & Stimpy Show explored fears of illness, decay and death as the show "featured filth, illness, disease and mutilation to an unprecedented degree, making these horrors an integral part of the show", with "Ren's Toothache" being a prime example as "exposed nerve endings writhe" in Ren's mouth. Goodman argued that the appeal of such disgusting images to young people was that young people know that their youth will not last and eventually they will grow old, their bodies will decay and finally they will die. Goodman argued that the presentation of images of sickness and bodily decay in The Ren & Stimpy Show was a way for young people to confront fears of their own eventual coming bodily decay in a comical context. American critic Calvin Kemph wrote that Kricfalusi often featured repulsive images, adding: "'Ren's Toothache' stands out as a primary example, where a rotted mouth of teeth turns grotesque, sharply detailing the smell and abject horror of a nightmare."

== Books ==
- Dobbs, G. Michael (2015). Escape – How Animation Broke into the Mainstream in the 1990s. Orlando: BearManor Media. ISBN 1593931107.
- Komorowski, Thad (2017). Sick Little Monkeys: The Unauthorized Ren & Stimpy Story. BearManor Media.
