= Insomniac Ren =

- The Ren & Stimpy Show episode
- Episode no.: Season 4 Episode 18
- Directed by: Steve Loter
- Story by: Bob Camp; Jim Gomez; Vince Calandra
- Original air date: January 21, 1995

Guest appearance
- Alan Young as Haggis MacHaggis

Episode chronology
← Previous "Aloha Höek"	Next → "My Shiny Friend"

"Insomniac Ren" is the eighteenth episode of the fourth season of The Ren & Stimpy Show. It originally aired on Nickelodeon in the United States on January 21, 1995.

== Plot ==
Ren and Stimpy sleep early so they can wake up early to golf the next day, but Ren is annoyed by Stimpy plucking his eyelashes, clipping his overgrown toenails, as well as his cleaning of his eyes and nose; he forces Stimpy to quickly finish his hygienic routine before bed. The toilet overflows and he commands Stimpy to jiggle the handle.

Ren just could not sleep because of Stimpy's childish antics, but he had fallen asleep when Ren tries to scold him. Stimpy initially snores normally, but they eventually get louder and louder, distressing Ren; his attempts to plug Stimpy's nose with soap and a plunger do not work. He decides to sleep on the living room, on a long couch he bought for Stimpy to watch television; the peace and quiet however do more damage, as Ren can hear everything, from the clock ticking and his heartbeat to a mite munching on the couch's fibers. He returns to his room as he cannot handle the multitude of small noises.

As time goes on, Ren continuously becomes more delusional, believing Stimpy to be asleep simply because he's stupid, all while Wiegenlied plays in an ironic way in the background. Stimpy imagines having equally stupid offspring who suckle his body, with an infantile Ren being the runt of the litter who is allowed to suck Stimpy's finger. Ren appears to chastise Stimpy for dreaming and making him unable to sleep, frightening the offspring, after which he beats up Stimpy; Ren has no knowledge of the dream's content and wakes up Stimpy.

Stimpy tries to make Ren a glass of milk, but the refrigerator is nearly empty with only three cockroaches playing cards on a can of sardines. He obtains a mysterious liquid which has a sedative effect on Ren, only for him to vomit them out when he reveals the liquid to be camel saliva. He then reads Ren a story, which turns out to be a fictitious Edgar Allan Poe horror novel; Ren had hid himself under the bed, horrified by Stimpy's grotesque storytelling techniques. He decides to sing Ren a lullaby as a last resort, dressing up as a one-man band and loudly sings one, making Ren's problem even worse while he sleeps in the middle of the performance.

It is 6 a.m. and Ren is still tortured from his insomnia, breaking his alarm clock; his friends Mr. Horse, Muddy Mudskipper and Haggis MacHaggis are annoyed by this. Ren offers $5 to everyone who can make him unconscious, which the three friends and Stimpy gladly oblige. They beat Ren into a coma with their golf clubs before going on with their arrangement, ending the episode.

== Cast ==
- Billy West as Ren, Stimpy, and Mr. Horse
- Harris Peet as Muddy Mudskipper
- Alan Young as Haggis MacHaggis

== Production ==
"Insomniac Ren" is the first episode in the series to be directed by Steve Loter, a newcomer with little prior experience in direction. He struggled while working at Games Animation, due to its highly demanding workplace culture, if not as toxic as before series creator John Kricfalusi was fired due to his toxic, erratic behavior, as well as the episode "Man's Best Friend" that caused the network to pull it from airings, leading his termination for good. Tom McGrath, future director of such DreamWorks films as Madagascar, Megamind, and The Boss Baby, had provided storyboards for the episode.

== Reception ==
American journalist Thad Komorowski rated the episode three out of five stars, liking the humor, background colors, and premise just decently.

== Books and articles ==
- Dobbs, G. Michael (2015). Escape – How Animation Broke into the Mainstream in the 1990s. Orlando: BearManor Media. ISBN 978-1593931100.
- Komorowski, Thad (2017). Sick Little Monkeys: The Unauthorized Ren & Stimpy Story. Albany, Georgia: BearManor Media. ISBN 978-1629331836.
