= Mad Dog Höek =

- The Ren & Stimpy Show episode
- Episode no.: Season 2 Episode 5a
- Directed by: Bob Camp
- Story by: Bob Camp
- Production code: RS5-6B
- Original air date: November 21, 1992

Episode chronology
← Previous "Haunted House"	Next → "Big Baby Scam"

"Mad Dog Höek" is the eighth episode of the second season of The Ren & Stimpy Show. It originally aired on Nickelodeon in the United States on November 21, 1992.

== Plot ==
Ren and Stimpy have joined a professional wrestling match under the stage names of Mad Dog Höek and Killer Kadoogan. Stimpy expresses concern about injuries, but Ren reassures him that professional wrestling is artificial and that no one will be harmed. Their next opponents are the hulking Lout brothers, Lump and Loaf.

On the first round, Ren bites Lump's brain, which temporarily incapacitates him; he however rejuvenates after drinking tea and squeezes him with his abdominal muscles. Stimpy tries to fight, but Lump chews him like bubble gum and releases him after blowing a bubble. Stimpy believes the fight to be fun, having acquired a masochistic love of pain, while Ren is horrified.

Lump squashes Stimpy and pulls his tongue while Loaf watches and yawns; he launches up into the air and catches Stimpy with his buttocks, slamming into the floor. He pulls Stimpy's legs after trapping him. Stimpy calls out Ren, who is relaxing with a book nearby, and forces him to fight. Lump tries to catch Ren with his hands, but fails as Ren is too small and agile; he however steps on Ren's tail. Ren decides to lift Lump's foot to release his tail, but it is too heavy; he did break his shoe and finds a wart. Realizing the opportunity, he bites it, causing Lump to shriek in pain.

Lump and Loaf become angered, and they beat up Ren violently; they break conventional wrestling rules by using machinery to twist Ren's neck and chokeholding him, which they did not get caught for by manipulating the referee's oversight; they even run on Ren's head with a car. They beat up the duo, only to play defeat, as the duo had angered them to their breaking point and they are not willing to kill the duo. They swear to actually hurt the duo at Hollywood, Yugoslavia, their hometown. Ren prepares to speak, only to be interrupted by Stimpy, who nonsensically rants about an individual named Darren and breaks his tongue in the process.

== Cast ==
- John Kricfalusi as Ren
- Billy West as Stimpy and the Wrestling announcer
- Bob Camp as Lump Lout and Loaf Lout

== Production ==
For the second season of The Ren & Stimpy Show, production of the episodes was divided into an "A" unit headed by the showrunner, John Kricfalusi, which had larger budgets and more time, and a "B" unit headed by Bob Camp, which received the opposite; despite this, Camp always finished his episodes on time and without going overbudget. "Mad Dog Höek" was one of the "B" productions assigned to Camp, alongside "In the Army", "Out West" and "Monkey See, Monkey Don't!". Camp decided the "cartoony" world of professional wrestling, with its over-the-top storylines and caricatured characters, would make for a good subject for a cartoon. Production moved forward swiftly on the "B" productions as Camp was less of a perfectionist than Kricfalusi. Camp described himself as being "more about the gag" as the episodes directed by him tended to be light on plot and were instead just merely a collection of gags centered around a single theme, in this case professional wrestling.

== Reception ==
American journalist Thad Komorowski in a review gave "Mad Dog Höek" four-and-a-half stars out of five stars, writing it was an amusing parody of the already cartoony and silly world of professional wrestling, with Stimpy giving a "completely deranged fit" at the end; he noted that the episode was made fresh and hilarious by Camp's execution.

== Books ==
- Klickstein, Matthew; Summers, Marc (2013). Slimed! An Oral History of Nickelodeon's Golden Age. London: Penguin Publishing Group. ISBN 9781101614099.
- Komorowski, Thad (2017). Sick Little Monkeys: The Unauthorized Ren & Stimpy Story. Albany, Georgia: BearManor Media. ISBN 978-1629331836.
