= Dinner Party (The Ren & Stimpy Show) =

- The Ren & Stimpy Show episode
- Episode no.: Season 5 Episode 14
- Written by: Vince Calandra
- Original air date: November 11, 1995

Guest appearance
- Alan Young as Haggis MacHaggis

Episode chronology
← Previous "School Mates"	Next → "Sammy and Me"

"Dinner Party" is the fourteenth episode of the fifth season of The Ren & Stimpy Show. It originally aired on Nickelodeon in the United States on November 11, 1995.

== Plot ==
Ren and Stimpy hold a dinner party at their residence, having acquired a mansion offscreen. Ren, self-proclaimed "master of etiquette", narrates the video as if it is a documentary while Stimpy delivers the invites to a desolate Mr. Horse, Muddy Mudskipper who had been arrested and does manual labor in prison and a certain baboon who lurks in a dark alley. He cooks the meals, including a soup which he drinks and regurgitates. Meanwhile, Ren pops a bloody cyst on his face to keep up appearances.

Stimpy welcomes guests and drives their vehicles to a parking lot, accidentally crashing Haggis MacHaggis' helicopter. He also welcomes Sammy Mantis and hangs his shed skin. He announces the arrival of a certain fly and his rancid meat "wife", Kowalski who had worked in the army and promoted to general, the Announcer Salesman, a certain beheaded chicken, Muddy Mudskipper and his gorilla wife. Ren notes that one must have a sweaty handshake to appear formal, which he does by groping the armpits of a Turkish strongman; Haggis is impressed by the handshake.

The party starts, as Stimpy sprays soup on the guests and Ren says his prayers. The guests gobble up the food, contrary to the party's formal nature. Ren flatters a baboon by insulting its buttocks, calming its aggression. The main course is served, honey glazed sheep liver with dusty wig stuffings. The guests enjoy the sheep liver, including Haggis who adds chutney for flavor. They show disregard to formal manners as they eat with loud noises and burp after eating, which Ren appreciates, except for Powdered Toast Man who has a sense of dignity. He refuses to burp, causing his head to fall into the baboon's plate, dying from his head being eaten. Stimpy rinses the dishes with a hose, washing away the guests.

After dinner, the gentlemen engage in parlor games and smoke cigars while the ladies have their feet polished by Stimpy. The guests reluctantly leave by the duo's force when the mansion's real owners, Mr. and Mrs. Pipe return; Ren and Stimpy had stolen their mansion while they were on vacation. The duo are spared by simply paying Mr. Pipe and having a good laugh with him while Mrs. Pipe drives them away, ending the episode.

== Cast ==
- Billy West as Ren, Stimpy, Powdered Toast Man, Sammy Mantis, and That Guy (Salesman)
- Alan Young as Haggis MacHaggis

== Production ==
The episode was storyboarded by Rob Koo and Armen Melkonian, who only worked on this episode at Games Animation and would be more well known for their work at DreamWorks Animation. There is no director credit, with the episode literally sent to Rough Draft Korea after preliminary storyboarding for animation. This episode is the last appearance of various characters including Haggis MacHaggis, voiced by Alan Young for the last time before his death and Powdered Toast Man, voiced by Billy West as Gary Owens was unavailable.

== Reception ==
American journalist Thad Komorowski gave the episode two out of five stars, noting it to be as "literally undirected" as its lack of director credit.

== Books and articles ==
- Dobbs, G. Michael (2015). Escape – How Animation Broke into the Mainstream in the 1990s. Orlando: BearManor Media. ISBN 978-1593931100.
- Komorowski, Thad (2017). Sick Little Monkeys: The Unauthorized Ren & Stimpy Story. Albany, Georgia: BearManor Media. ISBN 978-1629331836.
