= Ren's Brain =

- The Ren & Stimpy Show episode
- Episode no.: Season 5 Episode 8
- Directed by: Chris Reccardi
- Story by: John Kricfalusi; Richard Pursel
- Production code: RS-414
- Original air date: October 7, 1995

Episode chronology
← Previous "Stimpy's Pet"	Next → "Bell Hops"

"Ren's Brain" is the eighth episode of the fifth season of The Ren & Stimpy Show. It originally aired on Nickelodeon in the United States on October 7, 1995. It is the final episode of the series to be conceptualized at Spümcø, as well as the last with the involvement of writer Richard Pursel and the episode's director and storyboarder Chris Reccardi.

== Plot ==
Stimpy is an amateur neurosurgeon who operates illegal neurosurgery in a shed next to Ren and Stimpy's house. He conducts experiments on brains, rendering them unable to function after failing. He disappointedly goes back to sleep. The next morning, the Sun shines on Ren's head, making Stimpy realize Ren's brain might be good enough for his experiment. Morally corrupt from his work, he does not weigh the consequences and decides to extract Ren's brain.

Stimpy operates a drill intended for lobotomy, but uses it to open a heavily guarded jar where he acquires his hazardously sharp scalpel. He successfully extracts Ren's brain and spinal column, with four nerves for navigation, making the experiment a triumph. Despite the pain and noise from Stimpy and his chimpanzee assistant, Ren does not wake up. The brain is placed in fluid to keep it alive.

Ren awakes, but does not realize his situation; he sees the time and gets to work, able to drive without problems. Stimpy enters to find Ren's brain missing; he replaces Ren's brain with a telephone to keep him functioning. While Ren's body wakes up, Stimpy cowers in fear as he is too stupid to realize Ren's brain makes him think, believing him to react in anger, but he turns out to be able to survive and think with the telephone, albeit heavily intellectually disabled. Stimpy is moved that Ren's body can "play with him" after he responds to stimuli.

Stimpy plays with Ren's body in the backyard. He sprinkles cat litter on him and watches him run into walls and hits himself with a spoon while Ren hits himself with wood. Meanwhile, Ren is able to work with no issue, apparently able to function normally with just his disembodied brain; he had an unusually lucky day at work, gaining a promotion from his employer Stabco. He finds Stimpy with his body, but is too stupid to realize it is his body, believing it to be another Chihuahua, even when hearing voices from the telephone after assaulting him. Stimpy tries to restrain him and sedate him with a needle he prepared. Ren's body manages to broadcast the event on television, killing the entire population of the United States and the world (including Stimpy) from shock at the sight and destroying Earth ("Thus endeth the Republican Party as we know it!"). Ren's brain is the only survivor of the incident, flying in space and realizing what had happened, as he angrily calls Stimpy and his body idiots for the episode's events and ending the episode.

== Cast ==
- Billy West as Ren, Stimpy, and announcer
- Harris Peet as father
- Cheryl Chase as mother
- Cree Summer as boy child
- John Kricfalusi as Ren (uncredited; reused one line from "Svën Höek")

== Production ==
John Kricfalusi and Richard Pursel wrote the outline of the episode at Spümcø, intended to air as part as the second season, but Kricfalusi was fired in 1992 and Pursel refused his position at Games Animation following his termination from the network. Most of his outlines and loose plots were used by Games, save for individual rejected outlines like "Ren Gets Help" (which by itself was retooled by Nick as "Ren Needs Help!", though Kricfalusi would eventually save that idea for his future reboot series, Adult Party Cartoon, as "Ren Seeks Help"). Kricfalusi intended this episode to be the next cult classic in the entire series in preparation for its home media release, noting this when he reacted to the fact that he had no involvement with the final product during completion following his termination from Nickelodeon in 1992. "Ren's Brain" was the last to be used by Games, with production being delayed from the second half of its second season, and then again restarting production in the beginning of the third season up until the near end of production of the fourth season.

Showrunner Bob Camp attempted to direct the episode as part of the third season, as he had with most leftovers from Kricfalusi, with Spümcø alumni Jim Gomez and Kricfalusi's former protege and Michael Kim (after realizing his talent from his work on The New Adventures of Beany and Cecil) respectively producing storyboards and supervising layouts. He would allow Kim to work on every episode as a layout artist until his firing, where Kricfalusi was dissatisfied at his inability to provide large amounts of layouts in little time during the production of "Man's Best Friend". However, following his termination, the episode never went into fruition as production of the third season turned out to be as chaotic, leading Kim to quit working at Games, and instead work as animator and layout artist on Batman: The Animated Series at Warner Bros. Animation for higher pay for a short while.

Once Spümcø lost contract from Games, Kim was among the studio's alumni who migrated back to the studio in 1993; he would return to the studio to work on such episodes as "Stimpy's Cartoon Show", "Ren's Bitter Half", and "Double Header". Due to success of that episode, he would be among the many animators to rework on "Ren's Brain", but due to being creatively stressed and burnt out with the episode, he backed out and instead wrote and directed "Who's Stupid Now?", and would also storyboard one of the final episodes of the series "Pen Pals", with assistant storyboards by future Angry Beavers creator Mitch Schauer and additional storyboards by future Phineas and Ferb creators Dan Povenmire and Jeff "Swampy" Marsh; the latter three of which also worked at Games Animation during that time for the series Rocko's Modern Life. In replacement, Kim would let Chris Reccardi, the most capable draftsman that he was able to be hire into Games, reluctantly take over position as director of the episode as his final outing in the series before Nickelodeon quietly cancelled the series. Reccardi's unit had suffered and eventually closed due to immense conflicts; shortly after his and his team completed "Ren Needs Help", his wife Lynne Naylor had left the studio the same way she did at Spümcø due to these reasons, but he nevertheless wanted to direct one final episode. Reccardi ended up provided the storyboards and took over direction all by himself, neglecting the rest to make the episode as good as he can.

After lengthy delays of production time, between the series' second season during Kricfalusi's tenure and his firing from the network due to his toxic behavior, the episode eventually aired during a Nickelodeon-"commissioned" fifth season even as part of its fourth season production order, with Reccardi departing immediately after its production. It is also the final work Reccardi did on anything related to Ren & Stimpy. Once production on the show ended, most of the crew moved on to work on other projects, including Reccardi himself with many projects such as The Powerpuff Girls, Samurai Jack, The Grim Adventures of Billy and Mandy, and Regular Show for Cartoon Network Studios, as well as several other projects, up until his death in 2019; its original director, Michael Kim, would also go on to work for Fox Television Animation to become a storyboard artist for Futurama, then as director for American Dad!, and currently as director for Family Guy.

== Reception ==
American journalist Thad Komorowski gave the episode four and a half out of five stars, calling it one of Reccardi's best episodes as director, and naming it one of the best episodes from the Games era, noting the episode's delayed production from Kricfalusi's tenure.

== Books and articles ==
- Dobbs, G. Michael (2015). Escape – How Animation Broke into the Mainstream in the 1990s. Orlando: BearManor Media. ISBN 978-1593931100.
- Komorowski, Thad (2017). Sick Little Monkeys: The Unauthorized Ren & Stimpy Story. Albany, Georgia: BearManor Media. ISBN 978-1629331836.
