= I Was a Teenage Stimpy =

- The Ren & Stimpy Show episode
- Episode no.: Season 5 Episode 11
- Directed by: Tom McGrath
- Written by: Bob Camp; Vince Calandra; Jim Gomez
- Original air date: November 4, 1995

Episode chronology
← Previous "Dog Tags"	Next → "Who's Stupid Now?"

"I Was a Teenage Stimpy" is the eleventh episode of the fifth season of The Ren & Stimpy Show. It originally aired on Nickelodeon in the United States on November 4, 1995.

== Plot ==
Ren and Stimpy are foster father and son, with an adult Ren adopting an infantile Stimpy in a young age. Ren checks his mail, which are mostly for Stimpy, only to find his mail, a "cornographic" magazine named Husk (an unsubtle coverup of pornography). He then goes to the toilet to masturbate, only for it to be locked by Stimpy, who is horrified by his newly grown pimples. Ren is happy that Stimpy has started his puberty, as Stimpy can care for him for the rest of his life in adulthood. Ren grants him the Höek family grooming kit, which contains multiple strange items including a leech and pliers. Stimpy uses the pliers on a pimple, causing pus to shoot out and hit Ren, giving him a black eye.

Ren reads a book about cat puberty; Stimpy shows all signs in the book, including voice change, clumsiness, and his deciduous teeth dropping into the mush he prepared for Ren as dinner. He becomes extremely stressed and suddenly experiences a growth spurt, leaving the room in denial of his puberty. The next day, Stimpy discovers a new chest hair in what resembles an erection. He goes to the toilet again and gives Ren a bucket, much to his chagrin.

Stimpy hogs the telephone, talking with friends, refusing any call intended for Ren and prank calling others. He openly mocks Ren with his friends, which Ren tolerates as he reads about discipline. Stimpy asks Ren if he wants to go out, which he joyfully accepts, only for Stimpy to invite friends and want him to leave simply from embarrassment. Ren finds Stimpy hanging out with delinquents, casting them out and finally grounding Stimpy for being friends with them.

Ren watches home movies of him with a young Stimpy, noting how fast Stimpy had grown. Stimpy sneaks out of the room to steal Ren's "Husk" magazines, growing increasingly obsessed with its contents. Ren is considering being less strict to him when he finds out about the theft; he finds Stimpy having formed a pupa from the magazine pages. Ren notes this as a natural phase but insists on hitting Stimpy with a swordfish. Stimpy emerges as an adult with Superman's abilities, leaving Ren and flies towards the Sun, promising to write and return when he runs out of money. Ren bids him goodbye while Stimpy unintentionally flies too close and incinerates to death, ending the episode.

== Cast ==
- Billy West as Ren and Stimpy

== Production ==
"I Was a Teenage Stimpy" was the only episode to be directed by Tom McGrath, a newcomer who turned out to be a highly competent storyboarder and helped fix many episodes that were problematic in production into positively received outings, being granted the director credit of "Stupid Sidekick Union" in place of Ron Hughart as a result. Such experience as would eventually get him to work at DreamWorks as a director for the Madagascar films, as well as Megamind and The Boss Baby. He insisted on being the sole layout artist of the episode, with Stephen DeStefano assisting on storyboarding it, in the manner Chris Reccardi did so with "Ren's Brain" for being his final episode. Originally produced as part of the series' fourth season, it aired during a Nickelodeon-"commissioned" fifth season.

== Reception ==
American journalist Thad Komorowski gave the episode four and a half out of five stars, calling it the single best episode of the series produced by Games Animation and that it is comparable with the best episodes produced by Spümcø.

== Books and articles ==
- Dobbs, G. Michael (2015). Escape – How Animation Broke into the Mainstream in the 1990s. Orlando: BearManor Media. ISBN 978-1593931100.
- Komorowski, Thad (2017). Sick Little Monkeys: The Unauthorized Ren & Stimpy Story. Albany, Georgia: BearManor Media. ISBN 978-1629331836.
