= Dog Tags =

- The Ren & Stimpy Show episode
- Episode no.: Season 5 Episode 10
- Directed by: Ken Bruce
- Written by: Ron Hauge
- Original air date: October 28, 1995

Episode chronology
| ← Previous "Bell Hops" | Next → "I Was a Teenage Stimpy" |

"Dog Tags" is the tenth episode of the fifth season of The Ren & Stimpy Show. It originally aired on Nickelodeon in the United States on October 28, 1995. It is widely considered one of the worst episodes of the series.

== Plot ==
Ren prepares to go out for his "dog lodge meeting", with Stimpy giving him his hat and shoes reminiscent of a costume. It is revealed that Ren is a part of the Benevolent Order of Dog Bone Eaters, joining more than 53 years ago. Ren reluctantly lets a persistent Stimpy go with him despite the fact he is a cat.

Stimpy makes a fool of himself with an unconvincing disguise made from Hamburg steak. A walrus was kicked out for a similar reason, but Stimpy was able to enter for his peculiar appearance not particularly resembling a cat. Ren is however stopped for not resembling a dog that much either, as the Order does not allow "mosquito rat-faced rodents", but he proves himself to be a member with his tag. However, it expired in 1972, so Ren still has to prove himself in tests; he relents.

Ren tries to hunt an elk to prove, but he mistakes Ren for a rat and assaults him before flying away. The dogs note that he has to do actual tests to prove. Meanwhile, Stimpy fits in with the dogs and hits a piñata full of bones. Ren chases a car and gets run over, while the dogs explain he has to hot-wire one to prove; he proceeds to destroy a police car in a misunderstanding and escapes from prison. It is clear that the dogs are messing with him, as they urge him to marry a millionaire. He engages in more torturous tasks until the dogs tell him one last task: to clean himself in public. Ren aborts his attempt as he refuses to give up his dignity for membership. He renounces his "doghood" and attempts suicide by jumping into the sewers with a brick, but is stopped by Stimpy, who smuggles him to a "cat bar" where its regulars are more hospitable. The duo sip on milk, ending the episode.

== Cast ==
- Billy West as Ren, Stimpy, and the Leader of the Rat-faced Rodents

== Production ==
"Dog Tags" was produced for the series' fourth season and aired during a Nickelodeon-"commissioned" fifth season. It was storyboarded at Character Builders in Ohio, a less costly alternative to most animation studios by Jim Kammerud to save costs, which became one of the many criticisms of the Games-era episodes, such as this episode. The low quality of its storytelling was made worse by the fact director Ken Bruce was assigned the responsibility to direct the episode after it had been animated at Rough Draft Korea. It was also the last episode in the series to show Ren having a tail, whose depiction was highly inconsistent in the series.

== Reception ==
American journalist Thad Komorowski gave the episode zero out of five stars, considering it to be one of the worst in the series, especially due to the episode uncomfortably tackling on a subject like suicide, and how the characters acted selfish towards each other.

== Books and articles ==
- Dobbs, G. Michael (2015). Escape – How Animation Broke into the Mainstream in the 1990s. Orlando: BearManor Media. ISBN 978-1593931100.
- Komorowski, Thad (2017). Sick Little Monkeys: The Unauthorized Ren & Stimpy Story. Albany, Georgia: BearManor Media. ISBN 978-1629331836.
