= School Mates (The Ren & Stimpy Show) =

- The Ren & Stimpy Show episode
- Episode no.: Season 5 Episode 13
- Directed by: Mark Marren (credited as Kirk Field)
- Written by: Jim Gomez
- Production code: RS-435
- Original air date: November 11, 1995

Episode chronology
← Previous "Who's Stupid Now?"	Next → "Dinner Party"

"School Mates" is the thirteenth episode of the fifth season of The Ren & Stimpy Show. It originally aired on Nickelodeon in the United States on November 11, 1995.

== Plot ==
When Ren receives a call that Chuck, his old fraternity brother, is coming for a visit, he immediately shuts Stimpy into a closet and hides all feminine household items. After scaring Stimpy out of spite, Chuck is disappointed that Ren lives a domesticated life with a cat but does not care about his femininity. He kicks Stimpy out temporarily, but not before dressing him as a black cat due to his peculiar appearance. They chase Stimpy when he attempts to enter the house again, with Ren biting Stimpy's buttocks off.

The duo go to town to abuse townsfolk for fun and play cards with their other fraternity brothers. They return home with female dogs; while the female dogs chase Stimpy, Chuck finds Ren's old college yearbook, where he reveals Ren was a nerd during his college years; it is not known how the duo got more friendly with each other. Ren is dressed as a cat and chased to be reminded of those years.

The next day, Ren goes off to work, only to find Chuck and Stimpy bonding instead of attacking each other; the duo leave to abuse townsfolk and leave Ren to wash the dishes they had used. He remembers how he met Chuck; he had frequently abused Ren throughout their years. Chuck and Stimpy return, with Stimpy enjoying it, especially drinking toilet water; Chuck leaves calling Ren a bum. Stimpy cheers Ren up by dressing up as a black cat to be assaulted; Ren and Stimpy realize that Chuck's opinions on them do not matter and celebrate their friendship as the episode ends.

== Cast ==
- Billy West as Ren, Stimpy, Chuck, and porcupine

== Production ==
"School Mates" was initially produced for the series' fourth season and aired during a Nickelodeon-"commissioned" fifth season. It was storyboarded at Character Builders in Ohio, a less costly alternative to most animation studios by Brian Smith to save costs, which became one of the many criticisms of the Games-era episodes. Mark Marren produced the storyboards; due to his work frequently being revised by senior crew members like Bob Camp, he opted to be credited under the pseudonym Kirk Field. It was originally planned to be directed by Ron Hughart, who would later go on to direct select episodes of Futurama and become supervising director for American Dad!, but the responsibility had passed to Marren after Jim Gomez wrote the episode.

== Reception ==
American journalist Thad Komorowski gave the episode three out of five stars, noting it to be Marren's best episode as it had the assistance of Gomez' strong story.

== Books and articles ==
- Dobbs, G. Michael (2015). Escape – How Animation Broke into the Mainstream in the 1990s. Orlando: BearManor Media. ISBN 978-1593931100.
- Komorowski, Thad (2017). Sick Little Monkeys: The Unauthorized Ren & Stimpy Story. Albany, Georgia: BearManor Media. ISBN 978-1629331836.
