= Aloha Höek =

- The Ren & Stimpy Show episode
- Episode no.: Season 4 Episode 17
- Directed by: Bill Wray
- Written by: Jim Gomez; Bill Wray; Bob Camp
- Original air date: January 14, 1995

Guest appearance
- Dom DeLuise as The Big Kahuna

Episode chronology
← Previous "Pixie King"	Next → "Insomniac Ren"

"Aloha Höek" is the seventeenth episode of the fourth season of The Ren & Stimpy Show. It originally aired on Nickelodeon in the United States on January 14, 1995. The episode features Ren and Stimpy being stranded in an uncharted tropical island, finding a carcass of a whale. Ren kicks Stimpy out of it, only for him to meet the Big Kahuna of the jungle. It is considered to be one of the worst episode in the original run of the series.

== Plot ==
Ren and Stimpy wash up on a tropical island, with their personalities respectively being more aggressive and rational than usual. They immediately start to build shelter, a literal house with functioning equipment out of sand. The house is eroded by the water as they sleep, so Ren angrily seeks a house, only to stumble upon one inside a whale's carcass. Stimpy finds sand laced with dead sea shells and coral, which they both consider to be bountiful. On a hot day, the duo finally suffer from the rotting of the whale's carcass, but Ren refuses to give up this residence and evicts a rational Stimpy, who finds residence in the jungle. He meets the Big Kahuna, who agrees to take him in.

Ren roasts a gallstone over the fire when the Big Kahuna visits, but he confuses him with a cannibal, hiding in fear that Stimpy had been tortured, Meanwhile, Stimpy relaxes with two Hawaiian women while the Big Kahuna offers him food, including a dead Mr. Horse partway eaten by a shark and a human. He eats a slug and a hermit crab but refuses a Portuguese man o' war, which the Big Kahuna eats.

Twelve years later, the carcass' owner, a crab family, returns and tortures Ren, who agrees to do anything to be freed; he is sentenced to "walk the fly", literally walking a housefly he is chained to who aimlessly walks forward. Ren goes insane from days of walking, but finally realizes flies can indeed fly; he pilots the fly at a cliff. Ren orders the fly to fly to the Sun, which he does not heed, but collapses out of exhaustion; while Ren sinks he recovers his body. He brings it to Stimpy, who believes Ren is dead from drowning. Suddenly, Stimpy's watch alarm rings, leading to them revealing their true identities as Soviet secret agents Conrad and Yuri impersonating the duo. The episode ends with the Big Kahuna waving goodbye while he roasts the crab family at a fire.

== Cast ==
- Billy West as Ren, Stimpy, flies, crab family, Russian spies
- Dom DeLuise as Big Kahuna

== Production ==
The episode was directed by Bill Wray, who was known for his preference of art over writing; this episode suffered from a lack of in-house layout, causing its quality to decline substantially compared to other episodes directed by Wray. Wray storyboarded the episode with Chris Mitchell as his only episode as storyboarder of the entire series, let along in the Games Animation era of the series. Mitchell was usually a character modeler in the Games era.

Dom DeLuise was cast as a guest star in multiple attempts by showrunner Bob Camp to invigorate attention to the series after series creator John Kricfalusi was fired; the most infamous of those, Jack Carter's Wilbur Cobb appears in the episode as a cameo but was not voiced. The music used in the episode is similar in style to that of SpongeBob SquarePants, a series also produced by Games Animation's successor Nickelodeon Animation Studio, both shows used music library from the KPM Music Library.

== Reception ==
American journalist Thad Komorowski gave the episode zero out of five stars, considering it to be the worst episode in the entire series. He criticized its off-kilter ending and emphasis on the grossness of humor without any sort of punchline nor delivery.

== Books and articles ==
- Dobbs, G. Michael (2015). Escape – How Animation Broke into the Mainstream in the 1990s. Orlando: BearManor Media. ISBN 978-1593931100.
- Komorowski, Thad (2017). Sick Little Monkeys: The Unauthorized Ren & Stimpy Story. Albany, Georgia: BearManor Media. ISBN 978-1629331836.
