= Bell Hops =

- The Ren & Stimpy Show episode
- Episode no.: Season 5 Episode 9
- Directed by: Ken Bruce
- Written by: Jim Gomez; Vince Calandra; Ron Hauge
- Original air date: October 28, 1995

Guest appearance
- Mark Hamill as Mr. Noggin

Episode chronology
← Previous "Ren's Brain"	Next → "Dog Tags"

"Bell Hops" is the ninth episode of the fifth season of The Ren & Stimpy Show. It originally aired on Nickelodeon in the United States on October 28, 1995.

== Plot ==
Ren and Stimpy are bellhops at a hotel, with the Announcer Salesman as their superior. The Announcer Salesman, in an unusually serious manner, sends them to protect a celebrity at the hotel, Mr. Noggin, from any attempts by paparazzi to approach him. They carry on their daily task, helping tourists with their belongings, with Mrs. Buttloaves being particularly troublesome due to her morbid obesity; they resort to using a rocket under the lift as she is too heavy. She gifts two dirty breath mints to the duo, which Ren reluctantly receives and Stimpy gratefully eats it.

The Salesman orders the duo to bring a confidential package to Mr. Noggin's room that they must not open at all costs; Ren nevertheless does so and finds a normal hat. Stimpy explains that Mr. Noggin is an accomplished man who built the hotel on top of sacred Indian burial grounds with his fortune but was never seen for years. They give Mr. Noggin his hat at his room and receive dirty breath mints as tips again, enraging Ren. The duo vandalizes Mrs. Buttloaves' room after she goes out, as they do "cleaning the rooms" every day.

Stimpy clears out garbage when a mysterious man hidden in a rubbish bin requests money for a photograph of Mr. Noggin. Stimpy refuses out of loyalty and assaults the man with garbage, much to his distraught. Meanwhile, Ren helps out at the swimming pool, where he applies sunscreen on Mrs. Buttloaves and accidentally falling on it; Mrs. Buttloaves is sunburnt at the spot Ren fell.

Ren takes out the trash and accepts the man's offer of $5, but is lectured by Stimpy for attempting this act. Ren jumps into the room, with Stimpy following to get him out. He finds out Mr. Noggin is literally a head with no body, photographing him while Stimpy stops him. Mr. Noggin says that his condition forced him to be a recluse; Ren does not stop in his pursuit. Stimpy and Mr. Noggin jump off a window; the duo fall on Mrs. Buttloaves and survive. Mr. Noggin and Mrs. Buttloaves fall in love with each other and marry, with Ren finally taking the photograph he wanted and earning $1 million. The Salesman takes the money and saddening Ren, ending the episode.

== Cast ==
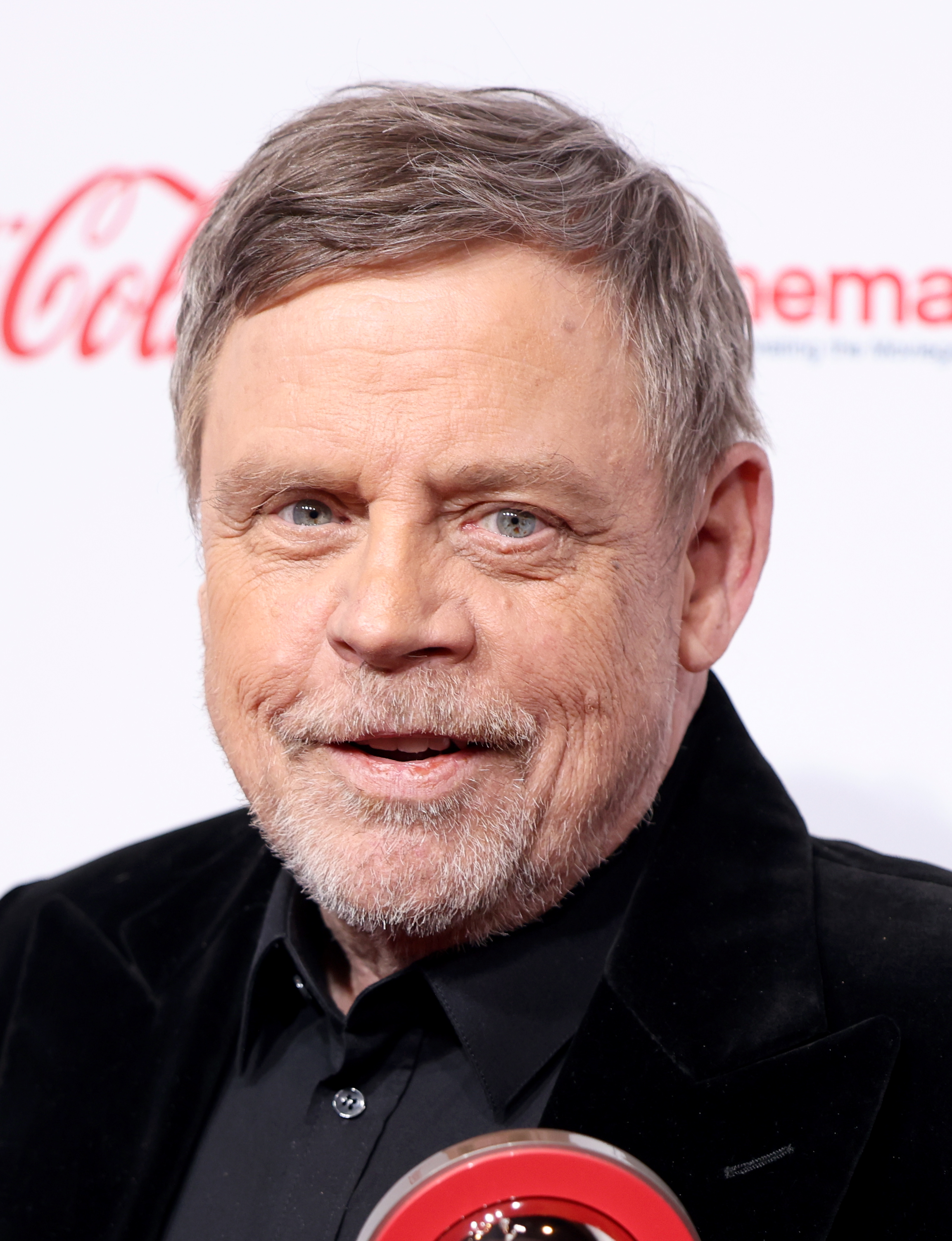
After being recruited by showrunner Bob Camp multiple times in failed negotiations to have guest stars appear in the show, Mark Hamill (pictured; 2025) would be one of the many celebrities to appear in the show, appearing in this episode as Mr. Noggin.

- Billy West as Ren, Stimpy, Mr. Buttloaves, and Salesman (That Guy)
- Mark Hamill as Mr. Noggin

== Production ==
"Bell Hops" was produced for the series' fourth season and aired during a Nickelodeon-"commissioned" fifth season. It was storyboarded at Character Builders in Ohio, a less costly alternative to most animation studios such as Rough Draft Studios by Jim Kammerud to save costs. The low quality of its storytelling was made worse by the fact director Ken Bruce was assigned the responsibility to direct the episode after it had been animated at Mr. Big Cartoons. Mark Hamill was recruited by showrunner Bob Camp to be the guest star of the episode in multiple attempts by Camp to reinvigorate discussion on the series.

== Reception ==
American journalist Thad Komorowski gave the episode two out of five stars, calling it "sometimes predictable" with a "funny concept".

== Books and articles ==
- Dobbs, G. Michael (2015). Escape – How Animation Broke into the Mainstream in the 1990s. Orlando: BearManor Media. ISBN 978-1593931100.
- Komorowski, Thad (2017). Sick Little Monkeys: The Unauthorized Ren & Stimpy Story. Albany, Georgia: BearManor Media. ISBN 978-1629331836.
