= Wiener Barons =

- The Ren & Stimpy Show episode
- Episode no.: Season 4 Episode 21
- Directed by: Bob Camp
- Written by: Ron Hauge; Jim Gomez; Bob Camp
- Production code: RS-415
- Original air date: February 11, 1995

Guest appearance
- Jack Carter as Border Guard

Episode chronology
← Previous "Cheese Rush Days"	Next → "Galoot Wranglers"

"Wiener Barons" is the twenty-first episode of the fourth season of The Ren & Stimpy Show. It originally aired on Nickelodeon in the United States on February 11, 1995.

== Plot ==
Ren and Stimpy are homeless and wandering somewhere in Arizona. Stimpy refuses every job offers Ren finds on a newspaper, which he reacts angrily and makes him choose; they decide to go to Canada for work in their valuable "wiener" industry, but not before they idiotically go west. They arrive at the border to Alberta by illegally hitching train rides and occasionally walking long distances, but are kicked out by a border guard. They devise plans to enter Canada.

Their first plan is to literally get around the border's river, which is full of baked beans; as pig fat floats on those beans, they kill a pig offscreen and ride it through the beans, only for it to sink midway; Ren almost dies by choking on baked beans, but is saved by Stimpy who apparently can swim in the beans. Their second plan is to impersonate "wiener inspectors" from the United Nations, which surprisingly succeeds despite their dismal attempt to disguise themselves. Ren fantasizes about getting rich in the country as they walk through the wiener-infested rural environment of Canada.

The duo open a farm, exploiting the environment's abundant source of "wieners", with Stimpy doing all the hard work. They eventually expand to mining and oil rigs, gaining them massive wealth. After an unknown period of time, they had opened their own theme park, an entire city and a whole luxurious building all to themselves. They enjoy the good life until a new synthetic sausage gains popularity, killing all enthusiasm for "wieners" and rendering the duo homeless and poor again, albeit submerged in their unused and useless pile of "wieners". One day, Ren has a vision about it raining baked beans for forty days and night, so they build a giant boat out of the unused "wieners" off-screen in the same manner as Noah's Ark. The duo sail away as Canada is flooded with the beans, ending the episode.

== Cast ==
- Billy West as Ren, Stimpy, and news anchor
- Jack Carter as border guard

== Production ==
Peter Avanzino, an eventual director for Futurama, did the episode's storyboards. This episode is the only episode where Jack Carter doesn't voice Wilbur Cobb as his guest appearance in a Ren & Stimpy episode. It was animated at Mr. Big Cartoons in Sydney, Australia. Originally assigned to Ron Hughart (who would also go on to direct episodes of Futurama and later become supervising director for American Dad!) to direct, it was instead given to showrunner Bob Camp, who also wrote the episode.

== Reception ==
American journalist Thad Komorowski gave the episode three stars out of five.

== Books and articles ==
- Dobbs, G. Michael (2015). Escape – How Animation Broke into the Mainstream in the 1990s. Orlando: BearManor Media. ISBN 978-1593931100.
- Komorowski, Thad (2017). Sick Little Monkeys: The Unauthorized Ren & Stimpy Story. Albany, Georgia: BearManor Media. ISBN 978-1629331836.
