= Powdered Toast Man (The Ren & Stimpy Show) =

- The Ren & Stimpy Show episode
- Episode no.: Season 2 Episode 1b
- Directed by: John Kricfalusi
- Story by: John Kricfalusi; Richard Pursel
- Production code: RS5-1B
- Original air date: August 15, 1992

Guest appearance
- Frank Zappa as the Pope

Episode chronology
← Previous "In the Army"	Next → "Ren's Toothache"

"Powdered Toast Man" is the second episode of the second season of The Ren & Stimpy Show. It originally aired on Nickelodeon in the United States on August 15, 1992.

== Plot ==
Powdered Toast Man is a superhero who lives under the disguise of Pastor Toast Man, a well-liked youth deacon and government clerk; he successfully hides his identity with only a pair of glasses despite his exceptional appearance à la Superman. His assistant is the only one who knows of his second life and notifies him whenever help is needed. He sets off to his daily superhero routine of fighting evil.

Powdered Toast Man notices a cat almost to be run over by a truck; he assesses the situation and spits raisins at a nearby airplane, which crashes on the truck, severely injuring everyone on board though leaving the cat miraculously unharmed. He nevertheless foolishly throws the cat aside before leaving, causing it to be actually be run over by another vehicle.

Powdered Toast Man flies to Antarctica, where he finds the Pope tied to a barrel of TNT, being held hostage by a malevolent Muddy Mudskipper. He teleports through the keyhole and saves the Pope after incapacitating Muddy with powder shots from his armpit. Just as the barrel is about to explode, he pretends to save Muddy, only to tie him on the barrel instead as punishment. The Pope grabs onto Powdered Toast Man's buttocks to ensure he does not get blown off, but is temporarily relocated on an iceberg while Powdered Toast Man continues his work. He flies to Ren and Stimpy's house to provide the duo with powdered toast, which they do not find appealing until he farts on it.

Powdered Toast Man finds his "toast particles" dissipating, realizing the President is in trouble. He teleports to the White House, finding the President to have had his penis caught in his zipper. Powdered Toast Man helps him with this menial task, but his brutal method renders the President unable to work, hence he makes Powdered Toast Man the President. Powdered Toast Man is distracted by a cold breeze, as he realizes that the fireplace was not lit; he burns two dusty documents revealed to be the United States Bill of Rights and the Constitution of the United States. He roasts food on the fireplace with the assistant, implying a romantic relationship between the two.

== Cast ==
- Gary Owens as Powdered Toast Man
- Cheryl Chase as the Catholic Schoolgirl Assistant
- Jim Smith as The President of the United States
- John Kricfalusi as Ren
- Billy West as Stimpy
- Frank Zappa as The Pope (The Guy in the Pointy Hat)
- Harris Peet as Muddy Mudskipper

== Production ==
John Kricfalusi had wanted to do a "special" episode featuring guest appearance by Frank Zappa, a musical artist that he idolized and inspired him to create the character from that one "fake commercial" segment in season one. The character of Powdered Toast Man had first appeared in a mock advertisement for Powdered Toast in the first season, which was reused in the episode. Kricfalusi had wanted to do more with the character in the second season. As such, he created a full episode dedicated to the character itself.

Richard Pursel helped write the episode as his first major work on the series beyond assistant credit, while Jim Smith and Bill Wray produced the storyboards. At the time, Zappa had prostate cancer and he was too ill to travel to Spümcø at Los Angeles, so he only recorded his performances at his home. Unlike many of the other episodes of season two, and unusual for any episode directed by Kricfalusi, "Powdered Toast Man" was completed on schedule for its premiered airdate on August 15, 1992. The episode was animated at Rough Draft Korea in Seoul, while the segment featuring Ren and Stimpy was reused from the first season, and much like its segment from before, it was animated by Lacewood Productions.

== Reception ==
The episode was received mostly positively. Irish journalist Padraig Cotter praised "Powdered Toast Man" as the "ultimate parody of superheroes". Cotter wrote: "Powdered Toast Man is a dark, but somewhat loving, parody of superheroes and comics. Despite being universally beloved within the show itself and having an ego to match, he's hilariously ill-suited to saving people. His lack of care often causes fatalities and, in most cases, it would have been better if he wasn't around to save the day at all...The fact nobody within Ren and Stimpy appears to realize how awful he is becomes part of the gag". Thad Komorowski gave the episode three and a half out of five stars, describing it to be "overrated, but still very funny."

== Legacy ==
"Powdered Toast Man" generated a firestorm of controversy when it aired in 1992, being widely denounced for being "anti-American" owing to the scene where Powdered Toast Man burns documents notable to American history. Nickelodeon and the Federal Communications Commission (FCC) was flooded with complaints over its "anti-American" content. One viewer, Kay Claire, wrote in to the FCC to say that, after watching "Powdered Toast Man", "I was so repulsed, I couldn't calm down. I was outraged when I saw that program. I want that cartoon pulled from the air because it has no social value whatsoever". The burning scene attracted so much attention that the overtly sexualized appearance of the character Catholic Schoolgirl Assistant, implications of a romantic relationship between the two after their fireplace dinner in the White House, and a scene where the Pope clings to the oversized buttocks of Powdered Toast Man passed almost unnoticed. In subsequent airings, the burning scene was censored.

The character of Powdered Toast Man became so popular as a result of the episode that in 1993 he had a cross-over appearance in the Spider-Man comics where he faced Spider-Man, as Marvel Comics published comics based on the series. A sequel to the episode, "Powdered Toast Man vs. Waffle Woman", was produced for the fourth season of the series that aired on November 1994. It was intended to be a possible pilot pitch for a sole Powdered Toast Man spin-off series, which ultimately was never picked up.

== Books ==
- Klickstein, Matthew; Summers, Marc (2013). Slimed! An Oral History of Nickelodeon's Golden Age. London: Penguin Publishing Group. ISBN 9781101614099.
- Komorowski, Thad (2017). Sick Little Monkeys: The Unauthorized Ren & Stimpy Story. Albany, Georgia: BearManor Media. ISBN 978-1629331836.
