= Cheese Rush Days =

- The Ren & Stimpy Show episode
- Episode no.: Season 4 Episode 20
- Directed by: Mark Marren (credited as Kirk Field)
- Story by: Vince Calandra
- Original air date: February 11, 1995

Episode chronology
← Previous "My Shiny Friend"	Next → "Wiener Barons"

"Cheese Rush Days" is the twentieth episode of the fourth season of The Ren & Stimpy Show. It originally aired on Nickelodeon in the United States on February 11, 1995.

== Plot ==
Ren and Stimpy are miners in the American frontier, where blue cheese is considered to be valuable and is experiencing what is similar to a gold rush. The duo head to Blue Cheese Mountain, where Ren selfishly forces Stimpy to pull their carriage while he plays the banjo in leisure.

Stimpy is exhausted after pulling the carriage up a cliff, only to spot a prospector. Ren runs over Stimpy while taking a look, with the prospector showing Ren his blue cheese earrings he hanged on his body's nooks and crannies, including his only tooth which is made of the mineral. Stimpy proceeds to set up shelter by making a buffalo they own eat grass, which makes its abdomen swell into shelter similar to an igloo.

Ren and Stimpy sit near a campfire where they make dinner, buffalo chips on toast, which Ren dislikes; this angers nearby "savage French chefs", which to Ren's horror do exist. They capture the duo and place them in hot water to make soup. Ren convinces the chefs to leave for having a "dead cat in his soup", with a waiter approving his demands of a "meat-to-go" special, which turns out to be the duo roasted on an open fire instead of letting them escape. Ren is disappointed by this while Stimpy likes the taste of him being roasted.

The duo somehow escape, but they suffer in the Valley of Slow Lingering Death, where the duo use up their energy reserves, barely able to crawl while malnourished and rotting. They finally find the Blue Cheese Mountain, with Ren mining with a pickaxe while Stimpy chews nearby sand to find nuggets. Ren, having acquired blisters from mining, suddenly smells "cheese gas" that might be deadly, so he uses an oversized yellow canary to check. The canary does not smell anything and lights a cigar, which explodes and proves the gas is deadly. Stimpy finds a vein of cheese, which Ren steals and locks Stimpy in with a brick wall to starve him to death, having given in to selfishness. The canary accompanies Stimpy, who permanently swears off friendship with Ren, as he is also locked in for nothing. Suddenly, the prospector appears from underground, enraging the canary with his attitude, but he wins the duo over with his knowledge of mining; the rock they sat on is valuable. The trio form an alliance.

Back in town, Ren offers his cheese to the bank, who kick him out for offering "fool's cheese", which is worth almost nothing. He is run over by the trio, who had become rich from their hard work, ending the episode.

== Cast ==
- Billy West as Ren, Stimpy, horse, french chefs, french waiter, bank teller

== Production ==
"Cheese Rush Days" was the first episode to be directed by newcomer Mark Marren; as his work were frequently revised by showrunner Bob Camp and other senior directors to the point they deteriorated in quality, he opted not to be credited on his episodes, instead using a pseudonym "Kirk Field".

== Reception ==
Thad Komorowski rated the episode zero out of five stars, criticizing the episode's juvenile humor.

== Books and articles ==
- Dobbs, G. Michael (2015). Escape – How Animation Broke into the Mainstream in the 1990s. Orlando: BearManor Media. ISBN 978-1593931100.
- Komorowski, Thad (2017). Sick Little Monkeys: The Unauthorized Ren & Stimpy Story. Albany, Georgia: BearManor Media. ISBN 978-1629331836.
