= Haunted House (The Ren & Stimpy Show) =

- The Ren & Stimpy Show episode
- Episode no.: Season 2 Episode 6a
- Directed by: Ron Hughart
- Written by: John Kricfalusi; Bob Camp; Jim Smith; Richard Pursel
- Production code: RS5-6A
- Original air date: November 21, 1992

Episode chronology
← Previous "Svën Höek"	Next → "Mad Dog Höek"

"Haunted House" is the seventh episode of the second season of The Ren & Stimpy Show. It originally aired on Nickelodeon in the United States on November 21, 1992.

== Plot ==
Ren and Stimpy arrive at a mansion, where they decide to spend time at, not knowing it is a haunted house. A depressed and homicidal ghost decides to make their experience at the mansion miserable. He tries to scare them with a grimace, only to be nonsensically injured when the duo kick the door down.

The duo start to be unsettled by their surroundings. Stimpy mistakes a suit of armor for a stove; the ghost tries to kill him with the axe, only to split Stimpy's firewood in half. Grateful, Stimpy throws the firewood into the armor and lights a fire, ironically making the armor function properly as a stove; the ghost is roasted into the form of a sausage.

The ghost hides in a piece of bread, when a hungry Ren and Stimpy decides to make a sandwich. Stimpy adds peanut butter, marmalade, premature roe from a fish and the fish itself to the sandwich. He prepares to eat it, but Ren stops him and gives it to a spontaneously appearing yak, which punches the sandwich before he decides to eat it; the ghost leaves the sandwich offscreen, tortured by the assault.

Ren and Stimpy go to bed upstairs, where Ren is amazed by the quality of the bed. However, he is appalled by Stimpy's unhygienic back, forcing him to take a shower. The ghost tries to assault him during his shower, but is mistakenly used as a towel by Stimpy.

Ren and Stimpy continue to sleep. The ghost puts a bloody severed head on Ren's head, only for the Bloody Head Fairy to collect it à la tooth fairy, and gift Ren some dimes. Ren is bewildered and ultimately pleased by this surprise, after which the ghost pummels himself in disappointment.

The ghost finally snaps and attempts to kill the duo while wearing a mask and wielding a chainsaw, only to be confused for a harmless trick-or-treater. The ghost reveals himself and nonsensically attempts suicide by hammering a nail into his head; Stimpy convinces him to consume poison instead, which actually kills him but causes him to reincarnate as a naked African-American musician (retroactively named Rudolph the Jazzman). Having found purpose in life, he drives away in a red car much to Ren and Stimpy's bewilderment.

== Cast ==
- John Kricfalusi as Ren (original)
- Billy West as Ren (redubbed), Stimpy, and The Ghost
- Vincent Waller as The Bloody Head Fairy
- Rudolph Porter as Rudolph the Jazzman

== Production ==
The story that became "Haunted House" was originally written as an episode for Tiny Toon Adventures in 1990, under the name "Hi-Spirits". The story had featured Hamton Pig and Gogo Dodo visiting a haunted house where a ghost tries to scare them. The story had entered the storyboard phrase at Warner Bros. Animation and the actor Don Messick had recorded the dialogue for the ghost. The creator Tom Ruegger, and the producers of the show over at Amblin Television, especially the heads Steven Spielberg and Kathleen Kennedy, rejected the story, despite its relative tameness compared to The Ren & Stimpy Show. The concept was taken to the majority of the same animators and replaced it with a segment made by the original production team at Spümcø. The studio did not sell the rights to the story, as John Kricfalusi decided to turn the story into an episode of The Ren & Stimpy Show for its second season. The drawings done in 1990 were used for the story, and Richard Pursel simply inserted Ren and Stimpy in place of Hamton Pig and Gogo Dodo, with the story mostly intact.

"Haunted House" was scheduled to premiere in October 1992 close to Halloween, as part of as its own special given its ghost theme, but production was so far behind that in July 1992 Kricfalusi hired Ron Hughart to take over production of "Haunted House", with it being his first directorial job for the entire show, and move the story forward to meet the October deadline. Hughart stated that he took the job of directing "Haunted House" "to help Kricfalusi out of a spot more than anything else". Production on "Haunted House" picked up speed after Hughart took over, and by August 1992 the episode was shipped out to Color Key Studios in Taipei to be animated. After Spümcø lost the contract for The Ren & Stimpy Show on September 21, 1992, Games Animation continued post-production and added in a new scene of the ghost trying to kill Stimpy in the shower, as a homage to the 1960 film Psycho. The Bloody Head Fairy, intended to be George Liquor in a tutu, was replaced by a parody of Doug Funnie from Doug, much to Kricfalusi's displeasure. Due to this, the episode was held back to a mid-November airdate.

The episode was censored on the home media release of the first two seasons, with the scene where the ghost places a severed human head on Ren's bed being removed.

== Reception ==
Critics such as Stephen Wilds criticized the episode for the amount of violence involved, such as the scene where the ghost uses an axe to try to behead himself. Thad Komorowski, however, gave the episode three-and-a-half out of five stars.

== Books ==
- Klickstein, Matthew; Summers, Marc (2013). Slimed! An Oral History of Nickelodeon's Golden Age. London: Penguin Publishing Group. ISBN 9781101614099.
- Komorowski, Thad (2017). Sick Little Monkeys: The Unauthorized Ren & Stimpy Story. Albany, Georgia: BearManor Media. ISBN 978-1629331836.
