= Rubber Nipple Salesmen =

- The Ren & Stimpy Show episode
- Episode no.: Season 2 Episode 3b
- Directed by: John Kricfalusi; Vincent Waller
- Written by: John Kricfalusi; Vincent Waller
- Production code: RS5-4A
- Original air date: August 29, 1992

Episode chronology
← Previous "Out West"	Next → "Svën Höek"

"Rubber Nipple Salesmen" is the fifth episode of the second season of The Ren & Stimpy Show. It originally aired on Nickelodeon in the United States on August 29, 1992.

== Plot ==
Ren and Stimpy have gone to work as door-to-door salesmen pushing the unlikely product of rubber nipple coverings. Stimpy and Ren have differing motives on the work. In a parody of the 1963 "I Have a Dream" speech by Martin Luther King Jr., Stimpy wishes everyone in the world to know the wonders of rubber nipples, while Ren is motivated by profits.

Their first house is owned by the Fire Chief from "Fire Dogs". Ren pushes Stimpy out of the way and goes to the door, only to be assaulted by the Fire Chief, who mistook Ren for circus midgets whom he hates; he nevertheless does not buy anything.

Their second house is owned by Mr. Horse, who is paranoid that the duo are sent by the FBI; it is strongly implied that Mr. Horse keeps a walrus as his sexual slave, who begs Ren and Stimpy to call the police. They do not do so, but Ren is distraught by the incident.

Their third house is owned by the Pipe couple from "The Boy Who Cried Rat!". Ren and Stimpy are allowed in, where they demonstrate a variety of impractical uses for the rubber nipple coverings. The couple agree to buy their entire inventory for five dollars and kick them out, landing on bulls who carry them away.

== Cast ==
- John Kricfalusi as Ren (original), and Mr. Horse
- Billy West as Ren (redubbed), Stimpy and Mr. Pipe
- Cheryl Chase as Mrs. Pipe
- Harris Peet as the Fire Chief and the walrus

== Production ==
The idea for the episode came from John Kricfalusi and Vincent Waller. Will McRobb gave his approval for the episode despite its risqué content, but insisted on removing "all the bits of innuendo John would pretend weren't innuendo". McRobb insisted that the word "rubber" always had to precede the word "nipples" as he felt having the characters talk about rubber coverings for nipples was acceptable, but talking about nipples was not. The production of "Rubber Nipple Salesmen" moved forward slowly at Spümcø, owing largely to the perfectionism of Kricfalusi. The artists on the layout stage complained that it took four weeks for Kricfalusi to give his approval as he wanted every frame to be perfect. Much of the animation was done at Rough Draft Studios, located in Seoul, South Korea. Animator David Koenigsberg stated that Rough Draft Korea was a new, inexperienced studio, which was reflected in their work as he stated: "When we tried to have them animate for digital ink-and-paint and camera in Hollywood, they could not follow one simple rule: never trace a line. There's no need to for digital. We had to fix scene after scene".

== Reception ==
American journalist Rachel Llewellyn described "Rubber Nipple Salesmen" as a product of a "bizarro world" from the mind of Kricfalusi. American journalist Victoria Vouloumanos wrote that the scene with the walrus being implied as Mr. Horse's sex slave was one of the most disturbing scenes in the show, as well as in American animation, made worse by the fact that the scene was played as a joke. American journalist Thad Komorowski gave the episode four and a half stars out of five, calling it one of the most iconic episodes of the entire series.

== Books and articles ==
- Dobbs, G. Michael (2015). Escape – How Animation Broke into the Mainstream in the 1990s. Orlando: BearManor Media. ISBN 978-1593931100.
- Komorowski, Thad (2017). Sick Little Monkeys: The Unauthorized Ren & Stimpy Story. Albany, Georgia: BearManor Media. ISBN 978-1629331836.
