= Who's Stupid Now? =

- The Ren & Stimpy Show episode
- Episode no.: Season 5 Episode 12
- Directed by: Michael Kim
- Written by: Michael Kim
- Story by: John Kricfalusi (uncredited)
- Original air date: November 4, 1995

Episode chronology
| ← Previous "I Was a Teenage Stimpy" | Next → "School Mates" |

"Who's Stupid Now?" is the twelfth episode of the fifth season of The Ren & Stimpy Show. It originally aired on Nickelodeon in the United States on November 4, 1995.

== Plot ==
In a prologue, Ren appears on stage, having become obese to renew his fame and is going to recount his origins. The home media release and various airings omit the opening.

Some time ago, Ren and Stimpy star in their own show, which went on for long enough for cancellation to be considered by their producer. Ren takes the news badly but successfully convinces the producer to continue the show, but the executive mandates that they have the switch roles.

The duo are sent to the Fat and Thin Institute for the Stars, where Ren is forced to devour "milkshakes" of unknown origin; Ren likes the milkshakes, but unbeknownst to him it is Stimpy's fat extracted from a liposuction. He is horrified to find a thin Stimpy, sad that he is the "stupid" one but revels in the fact that he can get more attention. Ren goes out to address his fans, the same scene in the prologue, but it ends disastrously as the crowd reacts in horror. Meanwhile Stimpy figures how to act like Ren and succeeds, beginning to act more aggressively. He successfully delivers his lines while Ren fails, angering the producer. Ren finally breaks down, assaulting the producer and Stimpy, when he realizes he is in front of a live audience. Despite everything, they applaud as what they see as a genuine performance when he calms down, with the producer and Stimpy cheering his success. Ren is happy that all goes well, ending the episode.

== Cast ==
- Billy West as Ren, Stimpy and TV executive

== Production ==
Series creator John Kricfalusi wrote the outline at Spümcø for an episode named "The Big Switch" during production of the second season before he was fired by Nickelodeon in 1992. Its plot was to involve Ren and Stimpy trading places, which Kricfalusi's former protege (and, at the time, animator for Batman: The Animated Series for Warner Bros. Animation) Michael Kim found interesting, having done episodes focusing on the duo's dynamic such as "Ren's Bitter Half" and "Double Header". Future Pixar animator Andrew Stanton (best known for Finding Nemo and WALL-E) did the storyboards, which ultimately were uncredited for the final product of the episode. Kim reworked the story without changing its core premise, intending to mock the network as the show was impeding cancellation. The episode was produced during the series' fourth season and aired during a Nickelodeon-"commissioned" fifth season ahead of cancellation. Kim noted that the circumstances made him unable to fix the story's weakness, worsened by Nickelodeon executives removing content they were offended by. Toon-Us-In provided the animation.

== Reception ==
American journalist Thad Komorowski gave the episode four out of five stars, noting it to be Kim's worst episode due to executive meddling, but still praised him for doing the best he can under taxing circumstances.

== Books and articles ==
- Dobbs, G. Michael (2015). Escape – How Animation Broke into the Mainstream in the 1990s. Orlando: BearManor Media. ISBN 978-1593931100.
- Komorowski, Thad (2017). Sick Little Monkeys: The Unauthorized Ren & Stimpy Story. Albany, Georgia: BearManor Media. ISBN 978-1629331836.
