= Svën Höek (The Ren & Stimpy Show episode) =

- The Ren & Stimpy Show episode
- Episode no.: Season 2 Episode 4a
- Directed by: John Kricfalusi
- Written by: John Kricfalusi; Bob Camp
- Production code: RS4-3A
- Original air date: November 7, 1992

Episode chronology
← Previous "Rubber Nipple Salesmen"	Next → "Haunted House"

"Svën Höek" is the sixth episode of the second season of The Ren & Stimpy Show. It first aired on Nickelodeon in the United States on November 7, 1992.

The episode originally aired on its own, as it clocks at fifteen minutes, longer than most episodes in the series. It received critical acclaim upon release and is considered to be one of the most well-known episodes in the series.

== Plot ==
Ren and Stimpy sit at home through the night, waiting for Ren's European cousin Svën to arrive. Ren is growing increasingly annoyed of Stimpy's stupidity and expresses his excitement to see Svën, with whom he had spent his childhood and believed to be intelligent. In the morning, Stimpy attends to a nonsensical "appointment", during which he pays a quarter to visit Mr. Horse hidden in a hidden compartment of the house, who immediately kicks him away. This angers Ren enough to prepare beating Stimpy up with a baseball bat, only for Svën to arrive. To his horror, he discovers that Svën has become an idiotic and bumbling fool akin to Stimpy. Ren's ire continues to grow while Svën and Stimpy bond over their shared love of disgusting antics, becoming the best of friends.

After Ren leaves to work, Stimpy and Svën engage in a round of "seek-and-hide". True to his stupidity, Stimpy immediately reveals his location. Stimpy allows Svën to enter while pleading with the audience for privacy; they engage in activities offscreen implied to be risqué in nature. The duo also play a board game called Don't Whiz on the Electric Fence, which requires players to try their best not to urinate over its eponymous model electric fence. When Ren arrives home, he is infuriated by the destruction and vandalism of increasingly absurd items in his collection. Having reached his breaking point, he storms towards the duo and threatens to harm and torture them to death, traumatizing both Stimpy and Svën and making them cry. However, he decides to urinate before killing the duo, only to notice the board game, and urinates on it as both a gesture of contempt and an act of revenge. The game explodes, resulting in the house being destroyed as the trio is sent to Hell, where Satan mocks Ren for his foolish act.

== Cast ==
- John Kricfalusi as Ren Höek (original), and Mr. Horse
- Billy West as Ren Höek (redubbed), Stimpy, and Sven Höek
- Michael Pataki as Satan

== Production ==
The episode had a troubled production, moving forward at a sluggish pace. The episode was approved of in November 1991, with network executive Will McRobb writing in a memo: "It's great to see an episode that explores the essential stupidity of Stimpy and Ren's equally essential exasperation". To avoid complaints of ethnic stereotypes (and the series consistently implied to take place in Yugoslavia), Svën was described as only as a generic "European" in the episode. However, Svën's mannerisms suggest he is German (and, more specifically, Bavarian) as he speaks with a German accent, uses words such as ja (German for yes), wears a Tyrolean hat and is dressed in a Lederhosen. The episode spent 11 weeks in the layout stage at Carbunkle Cartoons. When the layouts were completed, John Kricfalusi promptly announced that three-quarters of the work would have to be redone. American journalist Thad Komorowski blamed much of the slow pace of production due to "micro-management" by Kricfalusi, who altered the timing work that had already done by Bob Jaques on the episode, which further delayed the episode. Kricfalusi was notably unhappy with the background painting done on the episode, causing him to rip the paintings done by the background painters off the wall as he accused the painters of using "candy cane" colors.

Jaques complained about the poor layout work that his studio received as he expressed surprise that Kricfalusi "never took any sort of directional effort" to correct the mistakes. In the layout drawings of the scene done by Michael Fontanelli of Spümcø of the scene where Ren urinates on the electric fence, Ren walked onto the game. Animator Chris Sauvé said of the scene as presented to him when it was sent north to Vancouver: "That was a difficult scene to figure out because it had a pan, a pan walk, and it had to stop at an exact certain point to allow him to turn around and point at the game. There's a lot to figure out there. I remember saying to Bob, 'well, when I plan this whole thing out, he's supposed to walk by this game, he steps on the game! The game is standing right in his way of walking, what am I supposed to do?' And Bob did this drawing of Ren's leg stretching and we thought 'fuck, that's hilarious'".

Kricfalusi, who regarded the episode as his masterpiece, spent a disproportionate amount of the summer of 1992 working on the episode with the intention of having extended to half an hour, much to the vexation of the Nickelodeon network who had expected the episode to be finished for a premiere in the early fall of 1992. Fitting the German theme of the episode, the episode was intended to premiere at about the same time as the annual Oktoberfest beer festival which occurs in Munich every September. At the time that Spümcø was fired from the show on September 21, 1992, the episode was in post-production. The episode was finished at Games Animation, during which the title card, featuring live action footage of Camp playing the accordion in a stereotypical European outfit, was produced.

The episode was heavily censored by Nickelodeon, which banned the "sword swallowing" scene where it is strongly implied that Stimpy and Svën are lovers who are engaged in fellatio, which they refer to by the euphemism "sword shallowing". Much of Ren's soliloquy was censored, especially the line where he declares his intention to gouge out the eyes of Stimpy and Svën. Kricfalusi has expressed much displeasure over the censorship along with the post-production work done by Games Animation, with Games producing a new audio track with many improvements to his demands; this new version appeared in all modern re-releases, but Kricfalusi's intention to restore as many cut content in the home media release led to him ironically using the audio track he despised as first.

== Reception ==
Komorowski rated the episode as one of the best in the series, giving it five stars out of five. American critic Martin Goodman praised the episode for Ren's "stunning descent into menacing lunacy". Goodman expressed his approval for the episode for its shattering of taboos as it is implied that Stimpy and Svën are engaged in a homosexual relationship and the way that Svën shares his bloody bandages with Stimpy at a time when the AIDS epidemic was raging and controversial. Right from the pilot episode "Big House Blues" in 1990, there were strong hints in the show that Ren and Stimpy were a gay couple. Significantly, in the scene when Ren comes home, a piece of graffiti written on the walls of the house reading "Svën+Stimpy" in a drawing of a heart is visible. Despite the frequent hints about the sexuality of the eponymous duo, Jim Ballantine, a producer on the show, complained that many artists at Spümcø were "angry cynical young men who probably hate fags". Ballantine noted that the homosexuality of Ren and Stimpy was portrayed as sick, depraved, perverse, degenerate and unnatural. Further reinforcing the heteronormative message of the time, Ren was shown as being attracted to human women – which, notwithstanding the connotations of bestiality, is presented as more normal and natural than his relationship with Stimpy. Goodman was more positive, noting that the relationship was still a breakthrough in representation, given that it was a bold move in the context of 1992 where gay subjects were almost completely non-existent in American animation.

== Books ==
- Klickstein, Matthew; Summers, Marc (2013). Slimed! An Oral History of Nickelodeon's Golden Age. London: Penguin Publishing Group. ISBN 9781101614099.
- Komorowski, Thad (2017). Sick Little Monkeys: The Unauthorized Ren & Stimpy Story. Albany, Georgia: BearManor Media. ISBN 978-1629331836.
