= In the Army (The Ren & Stimpy Show) =

- The Ren & Stimpy Show episode
- Episode no.: Season 2 Episode 1a
- Directed by: Bob Camp
- Written by: Bob Camp
- Production code: RS5-2B
- Original air date: August 15, 1992

Episode chronology
← Previous "Stimpy's Invention"	Next → "Powdered Toast Man"

"In the Army" is the first episode of the second season of The Ren & Stimpy Show. It originally aired on Nickelodeon in the United States on August 15, 1992. It is the first episode in the series to not be directed by creator John Kricfalusi, with developer Bob Camp taking up these duties.

== Plot ==
Ren and Stimpy have decided, for reasons that are never explained, to join the U.S. Army. They stand no higher than the other to-be-soldiers' feet, and are tricked into being vaccinated and having haircuts (despite a warning at the eye chart). Despite this, they successfully join.

The duo engage in military training under a Sergeant with nonsensical abilities, with Stimpy proving to be a competent soldier while Ren struggles to understand the Sergeant's commands; in one instance he misconstrued orders of multiple sit-ups to paying the Sergeant 20 dollars, resulting in the money to be destroyed and the duo sent to peel potatoes as punishment. Stimpy believes Ren to be more important as he was assigned to peel more potatoes compared to Stimpy's minuscule amount.

The duo are ordered to withstand being in a room full of tear gas. They try to leave but are stopped by the Sergeant on top of a cannon. Stimpy, unable to withstand the gas, turns green and cries in pain while Ren stays unharmed by holding his breath. The Sergeant forces the duo to go back in the room, and they are punished again to peel watermelons.

The duo are forced to hold big sacks of supplies while they walk through a muddy area. Ren, who is unable to hold the weight, collapses and convinces Stimpy to carry him and his supplies. He is punished by having to carry the Sergeant in addition to his supplies.

After a long day, the duo finally get to their bunkers to sleep, and their feet are swollen and smelly from hard work. Ren tries to sleep, only to be waken up by sirens; tortured by his ordeal and sleep deprivation, he goes insane and chops up his bed. The duo are again punished by being sent to peel warheads.

The next day, Ren fantasizes that the army intends to kill them both and try to kill them, only for the Sergeant to notify them that they had graduated and can officially go to war. They are happily sent to war at an unidentified country, descending in burning tanks while singing "America the Beautiful".

== Cast ==
- John Kricfalusi as Ren
- Bob Camp as the military sergeant and Ren's singing voice
- Billy West as Stimpy

== Production ==
Unlike the first season, where all of the episodes were directed by John Kricfalusi, in the second season, with the increased workload imposed by 20 episodes, production was assigned to several directors. In practice, production for the second season was primarily divided between the "A" productions headed by Kricfalusi, which had money and time lavished on them, vs. the "B" productions headed by one of the show's developers Bob Camp, which had lower budgets and less time. "In the Army" was one of the lesser "B" productions assigned to Camp; "In the Army" is, consequently, the first episode in the series to not be directed by Kricfalusi and to have a writer's credit. Camp tended to combine the process of making the storyboard phrase and the layouts into one, which increased the speed of production. Camp referred to himself as being "more about the gag", and the productions directed by him tended to be thin on plot, instead being a loose collections of gags built around a single theme, in this case Ren and Stimpy joining the United States Army. "In the Army" was finished on time for its scheduled premiere in August 1992 and slightly under budget. The episode was illustrated at Rough Draft Korea in Seoul. American journalist Thad Komorowski wrote that "In the Army" was a difficult episode to illustrate because it was "heavy on distortion", but that the artists of Rough Draft Korea were able to complete the episode on time and in full with "admirable deftness".

== Reception ==
In a review, American critic Sim Basible wrote "In the Army" was "fun without being particularly memorable". Komorowski gave the episode three and a half out of five stars, noting that it exemplifies Bob Camp's raucous animation style, turning a stale and unoriginal story into an outrageous and fun episode.

== Books ==
- Klickstein, Matthew; Summers, Marc (2013). Slimed! An Oral History of Nickelodeon's Golden Age. London: Penguin Publishing Group. ISBN 9781101614099.
- Komorowski, Thad (2017). Sick Little Monkeys: The Unauthorized Ren & Stimpy Story. Albany, Georgia: BearManor Media. ISBN 978-1629331836.
