= List of The Ren & Stimpy Show characters =

Over its five seasons, The Ren & Stimpy Show featured a varied cast of characters, some who appeared in as few as one episode, and some who were practically regulars.

== Ren and Stimpy ==
=== Ren Höek ===
Ren Hoëk (voiced by John Kricfalusi in Seasons 1–2 and Adult Party Cartoon, Billy West in Seasons 3–5 and most laughter and screaming, and Chris Edgerly in Nicktoons MLB) is an anthropomorphic Chihuahua with a fairly long, rat-like pink tail (which constantly disappears due to the character's animation limits), pink eyes and tan fur. Martin "Dr. Toon" Goodman of Animation World Magazine described Ren as "scrawny", "dyspeptic", and "violently psychotic". On some occasions, Ren "lost his mind" in a "cumulative process", resulting in Ren becoming, in Goodman's words, a "screaming klaxon, neon-pink eyes dilating into twin novae inches above his jagged, monolithic teeth". Andy Meisler of The New York Times described Ren as "adventurous", "intelligent", and "emotionally brittle".

Kricfalusi originally voiced Ren in a manner that he describes as "a bad imitation of Peter Lorre". Billy West said that he auditioned to play Ren; the creators of the series believed that having West voice Ren and Stimpy would give him too large of a workload. West would, however, take over Ren's voice after Nickelodeon fired Kricfalusi. As West refused to return for Adult Party Cartoon, Kricfalusi returned for the role in that series. In the pilot, Pierre Decelles provided Ren's signature diabolical laughter, while West performed Ren's maniacal laugh in the series.

Kricfalusi complained about Nickelodeon executives requesting for Ren to have "a softer side".

Bill Wray said that Ren was his favorite character to write for; Wray described Ren as "fun" because "you can make him mean". In 1993, he added that, "It drives me crazy when I tell people I work on the show and they always say, 'Make Ren meaner'".

=== Stimpy ===
Stimpson J. "Stimpy" Cat (voiced by Billy West in the series, Eric Bauza in Adult Party Cartoon and Nicktoons MLB) is a 3-year-old obese, red and white anthropomorphic Manx cat. His significant physical features a large blue nose, purple eyelids, no tail, white gloves with fingernails on them, human-style buttocks, flat feet and a brain the size of a peanut (despite some intelligence, such as when cooking and inventing). Martin "Dr. Toon" Goodman of Animation World Magazine described Stimpy as "obese" and "brain-damaged". Andy Meisler of The New York Times described Stimpy as "barrel-chested" and "good-natured".

Stimpy's trademark facial expression is a blissfully ignorant smile with his tongue flopping out. Most of the time when he gets excited, he says his famous catchphrase, "Oh, joy!" or simply "Joy". He also has a strong attachment to his "first material possession" which is a litter box (given to him in the pilot episode) and even though Ren destroys it (by bashing it on his head in "Fire Dogs" or dumping it in acid in "Ren's Bitter Half"), Stimpy always reacts strongly to it by crying, panicking or fainting, though it always appears again in some later episode. He is frequently confused with a dog, due to his peculiar appearance for cats, that allow him to partake in dog-related activities to disastrous results; for example, George Liquor designated him as a "Cornish Rex Hound" to enter him in a dog show. While the duo's relationship has been ambiguous in the original series, Stimpy is occasionally depicted in a feminine role, helping with housework and maintaining the residence (if any) while Ren goes to work.

Stimpy is named after an art school classmate of Kricfalusi, animator Harold Duckett, whose nickname was "Stimpy Cadogen" ("Killer Cadogen" was Stimpy's pseudonym in several episodes, and in a few others he is referred to as Stimpleton Cadogen). Billy West, who voiced Stimpy, said that he based Stimpy's voice on a "sped up" Larry Fine of The Three Stooges. West described Stimpy as one of his favorite characters. Eric Bauza voiced Stimpy in the Ren & Stimpy "Adult Party Cartoon" because West believed that the series had no humor and that voicing Stimpy in it would damage his career, as West later said in an interview. Stimpy likes to create destructive electronic devices, whenever he has sufficient intelligence for it in episodes and feels a fixation for "sensory pleasures of fresh kitty litter".

Bill Wray described Stimpy as his favorite character to draw. Wray said that Stimpy has "a huge range of emotion".

== Mr. Horse ==
Mr. Horse (voiced by John Kricfalusi in Seasons 1–2 and Adult Party Cartoon, Billy West in Seasons 3–5) is a bipedal anthropomorphic Andalusian horse with prominent cameo appearances in the series. He is usually bipedal, aside from instances he is depicted as a mere horse. His catchphrase is "No sir, I don't like it", which he uses to answer questions from passersby. He is usually depicted as a straight-talking and cynical individual with a degree of eccentricity, getting along with Ren and Stimpy whenever they interact. In the episode "Rubber Nipple Salesmen", it is revealed that Mr. Horse kept a distressed walrus as a pet while believing Ren and Stimpy to be FBI agents.

== Powdered Toast Man ==
Powdered Toast Man (voiced by Gary Owens in most appearances, Darrin J. Sargent in the first "Powdered Toast Man" commercial, Corey Burton in Nicktoons MLB, David Kaye in Nickelodeon All-Star Brawl and Nickelodeon Kart Racers 3: Slime Speedway, Michael Berger in Smite) is a melodramatic toast-headed superhero and a spokesperson for Powdered Toast, a breakfast treat that "tastes just like sawdust". He was based on a Frank Zappa-inspired character called Studebacher Hoch, from the song "Billy the Mountain". The character appeared in Powdered Toast commercials on The Ren & Stimpy Show, and starred in two of its episodes: "Powdered Toast Man" (with Frank Zappa as "the Pope") and "Powdered Toast Man vs. Waffle Woman". He is depicted as extremely incompetent in heroics, causing unintentional destruction and lax treatment of the people he saves. He does not have a morally reinforced conscience, as demonstrated by his time as the President of the United States; in his titular episode, he denies the people's basic rights (which they idiotically celebrate) while burning the United States Bill of Rights and the Constitution of the United States in a fireplace for warmth.

By day, Powdered Toast Man is Pastor Toastman, a "cool" youth deacon; it is implied that he is competent at his day job, gaining popularity among the youth, in contrast to his superhero career. His disguise is a pair of thick black spectacles and a pastor's collar reminiscent of Superman's thinly disguised but effective alter ego, Clark Kent. Pastor Toastman's office is his headquarters; he is served by a lovely young female assistant named "Catholic High School Girl", who serves as his confidant; it is suggested that they have a romantic relationship.

=== Powers and abilities ===
Powdered Toast Man has a number of abilities and, like many superheroes, has a mysterious background and an alter ego. The character's catchphrase is "Leave everything to me".

Powdered Toast Man can fly by flatulence, by inserting his head into a special toaster and launching from it, or by pushing off from the ground. He also flies backwards, and can hover in midair. His powers include projection of foods associated with bread as offensive weapons: high-velocity raisins shot from his mouth, hyper-corrosive croutons fired from his armpit, butter pats launched from the top of his head, and acidic marmalade from his navel. There are several signals that alert Powdered Toast Man to danger: his tongue phone, the inflation of his briefs, the dissipation of toast particles in his head, or the reading of emergency messages encoded in slices of olive loaf. He is apparently made entirely of powdered toast, since he can produce fully formed toast by flicking his wrist or separating his head (which is made of two pieces of toast) and scraping the interior with a butter knife. His head is depicted as two identical pieces of toast, each with a face.

== Muddy Mudskipper ==
Muddy Mudskipper (voiced by Harris Peet) is an anthropomorphic mudskipper who works as a grizzled vaudeville comedian, hosting his titular children's television series, which is depicted as a low-effort production with subpar animation and invasive product placement akin to a Hanna-Barbera series. He is depicted as a cynical individual, calling everyone "a lousy bum". Besides being a huge television star, Muddy has dabbled in villainy, at one point kidnapping the Pope (voiced by Frank Zappa) before being foiled by Powdered Toast Man. Stimpy is a huge fan of him and his series.

Muddy's lines were also used as archive recordings from these last three episodes for Nickelodeon 3D Movie Maker.

== Mr. and Mrs. Pipe ==
Mr. and Mrs. Pipe (voiced by Billy West and Cheryl Chase) are a 1950s' sitcom-styled suburban couple. Always seen only from the waist down, they are depicted as a standard, if somewhat hapless couple. The son of Old Man Hunger, Mr. Pipe is typically seen with a pipe and clad in a bathrobe, slippers and black socks supported by sock-suspenders. He loves to wear rubber nipples on his knees and farts at inappropriate moments. His shaved beard is briefly seen in "Big Baby Scam". Mrs. Pipe is depicted as a standard housewife with seemingly no unique traits, though it is revealed that she had copious amounts of body hair in "Rubber Nipple Salesmen". The couple have two children named Eugene and Shawn, who are literate and act like gangsters, frequently leaving the residence without notifying their parents. They had kept a baboon as a pet in "A Yard Too Far".

== The Announcer Salesman ==
The Announcer Salesman (voiced by Billy West) is a charismatic traveling salesman. He is depicted as an omnipotent being, able to warp reality to invasively promote his products to unwitting individuals. He fulfills various roles in cameo appearances, including a narrator, an announcer, a dog-show judge and a real estate agent, while being a nuisance to other characters. The character is never referred to by any name in the series, but the name of "Hey, It's That Guy" seems to be the official name given by West.

== Haggis MacHaggis ==
Haggis MacHaggis is a short, bald stereotypical Scotsman. At one point, he starred in his own animated series, but its abysmal quality, low ratings and competition from Ren and Stimpy led to his downfall. He is created by Chris Reccardi and voiced by Alan Young, appearing mostly in episodes directed by Reccardi.

== Wilbur Cobb ==
Wilbur Cobb (voiced by Jack Carter) is a demented, decaying animator who was once the foremost animation producer in the world, but had since committed crimes serious enough to be committed into death row. He speaks in malapropisms and suffers from a malady that results in body parts falling off. He first appears in the episode "Stimpy's Cartoon Show", where he watches and appreciates Ren and Stimpy's production I Love Pink, before dying with them on the electric chair. An unsubtle parody of Walt Disney, John Kricfalusi originally wanted his name to be Raymond Spum (a reference to the pseudonym that he used in episodes he considered unsatisfactory), but after his termination from the series Nickelodeon renamed him Wilbur Cobb after the story editor. Showrunner Bob Camp shoehorned cameo appearances of the character into multiple future episodes beyond his initial one-time appearance, out of pity for Carter who had fallen into hard times; this was criticized by other crew members to have contributed to the series' fall in quality.

== The Fire Chief ==
The Fire Chief (voiced by Harris Peet) is a fireman. He is depicted as a competent and kindly figure, willing to hire Ren and Stimpy as firedogs and is usually friendly with them. Despite this, he has a psychotic hatred for "circus midgets", having mistook Ren and Stimpy for them. He is based on animator Ralph Bakshi, a mentor and friend of John Kricfalusi; he is revealed in "Fire Dogs 2" to be in fact a caricature of Bakshi himself; Bakshi voices the character in the episode.

== Mrs. Buttloaves ==
Mrs. Buttloaves is a homely weird-looking woman dressed in a bulging pink night gown and hair curlers. She first appeared in "Fire Dogs", having appeared in subsequent episodes as cameos. She is the mother of Old Man Hunger, consequently the grandmother of Mr. Pipe and the great-grandmother of Eugene and Shawn Pipe; her surname implied she had remarried, which is confirmed as she has a baby. She is voiced by John Kricfalusi for the show's first two seasons and subsequently by Billy West.

== Old Man Hunger ==
Old Man Hunger is a recurring character who first appeared in "Big House Blues". He was voiced by John Kricfalusi, Billy West, and Bob Camp. He is depicted as a physically queer and seemingly perverted old man, who is nevertheless competent in his job. He is implied to be younger than he looks, as he is the son of Mrs. Buttloaves, the father of Mr. Pipe and consequently the grandfather of Eugene and Shawn Pipe; the moniker "Old Man Hunger" may have been a nickname.

== George Liquor ==
George Liquor is a stereotypical-patriotic American citizen. He is depicted as a highly aggressive individual, having extremely warped beliefs. When episodes featuring him were aired on Nickelodeon, his family name was edited out. Instead, the scene would pause and a record-scratching sound effect would be played in place of the word "Liquor". Many story pitches featuring Liquor were vetoed by Nickelodeon due to their dislike for the character. After Kricfalusi's termination from the show, the rights to the character were returned to him.

According to Kricfalusi, he is Ren and Stimpy's official owner. He was voiced by Michael Pataki until his death in 2010, preceded by Harris Peet who voiced prototypes of the character in "The Boy Who Cried Rat" and "Black Hole". Kricfalusi provided additional voice lines for the character that Pataki had not recorded before his death in "Cans Without Labels", the character's final official appearance.

== Other characters ==
- Abner Dimwit and Ewalt Nitwit are a pair of incredibly unintelligent hillbillies who are sheriff and deputy of a small Wild West town. They have a strong proclivity for hanging, so much so that they eventually hang themselves in absence of a suitable hangee. When Abner and Ewalt think about something, even the most simple of problems, the theme from Jeopardy! plays. Ewalt was voiced by Bob Camp, and Abner was voiced by both Jim Smith and Bob Camp.
- Svën Höek is Ren's German cousin whom Ren has not seen since they were in the whelping box together. Ren longs to have an intellectual conversation with his cousin, but much to his horror, Sven is even stupider than Stimpy — they even belong to the same fraternal organization, the "Loyal Order of Stupids" — and he forms an instant bond with him. Stimpy and Sven engage in idiocy with Ren's things when he goes to work. When Ren returns, he sees the mess and finds them playing "Don't Whiz on the Electric Fence". In spite, Ren does the very thing the game says not to do, sending them all to Hell. He only appeared in the eponymous episode (season 2, episode 4) of the original cartoon but made further appearances in the comic book and a cameo appearance in the Season 3 episode "Jerry the Bellybutton Elf". Billy West voiced the character. John Kricfalusi wrote that he took many European stereotypes and used them in parody to form Sven. He claims that Europeans who watched the show did not feel offended by the character and liked the show.
- Waffle Woman is Powdered Toast Man's nemesis and appears in the episode "Powdered Toast Man vs. Waffle Woman". She was voiced by Gail Matthius.
- The Shaven Yak is the shaven icon of Yak Shaving Day. He rides through the sky in a canoe and is capable of emerging from and disappearing into sink and tub drains. Although he is shaven, he is on a constant vigil against getting a five o'clock shadow.
- Kowalski, Bubba, and Jiminy Lummox are of the trio known as lummoxes. Kowalski appeared in the season 2 episode "Fake Dad", in which Ren & Stimpy participate in a youth mentoring-type program. Instead of a child to mentor, they receive a convicted criminal who behaves much like a very large, very violent child who only eats meat. Kowalski is possibly based on a similar character of the same name from Fredrick Forsyth's political thriller The Day of the Jackal and professional wrestler Killer Kowalski and is voiced by Harris Peet. Bubba is Ren's nephew who appeared in "The Cat Who Laid the Golden Hairball". Jiminy Lummox serves as the manifestation of Stimpy's conscience. When lent to Ren, Jiminy correct his behavior by mercilessly punishing him after any bad deed, big or small; he smashed Ren's face in with a guitar as penance for his earlier crimes. As a spoof of Jiminy Cricket, Jiminy Lummox sings a song similar to "When You Wish Upon a Star". He was voiced by Stan Freberg.
- The Lout Brothers are two large, very muscular wrestlers who take on Ren and Stimpy in "Mad Dog Hoëk". They dominate the boys, which Ren does not appreciate, cowering in fear, while Stimpy enjoys the match despite the pain and humiliation. In the end, the two throw the fight, only to threaten to treat Ren and Stimpy even worse in the next match.
- Stinky Wizzleteats is a character whose design and voice characterization are based on the folk balladeer Burl Ives. He is the spirit of Yaskmas and sings the recorded version of the "Happy Happy Joy Joy" song, digressing into demented and furious rants ("I told you I'd shoot but you didn't believe me! Why didn't you believe me?"), taken from Ives' movie The Big Country in between the chorus. He delivers sausage and pre-chewed gum to children on Yaksmas Eve, flying through the sky on a sausage cart driven by the Shaven Yak. Voiced by John Kricfalusi at first, then by Billy West and Bob Camp after Kricfalusi was fired.
- Reverend Jack Cheese is a brooding, deeply-troubled itinerant preacher with the words "PITY" and "SELF PITY" tattooed on the knuckles of his right and left hands reminiscent of Reverend Harry Powell in the film Night of the Hunter. He hires Ren & Stimpy to assist in his travelling minstrel show where they evangelize the gospel of meat. Plays a one-stringed guitar. Voiced by Frank Gorshin. He is loosely based on series creator John Kricfalusi and his name is a punk on Monterey Jack cheese.
- Jose Poo is an overweight Hispanic entrepreneur in the Adult Party Cartoon episodes. He owns a bar in "Onward and Upwards", a shop in "Naked Beach Frenzy", and makes cameos as "Mexican Elvis" and the owner of "Chunkey Butt" Ice Cream in "Altruists" and "Stimpy's Pregnant". Based on Spumco Canada artist Jose Pou.
- The Nerve Ending Fairy is a character who appears when Ren loses all his teeth, leaving his mouth full of "stinky gum holes". Stimpy, who has perfect dental hygiene, convinces Ren to pull out his nerve endings with tweezers and put them under his pillow for the Nerve Ending Fairy. As Ren and Stimpy sleep that night, out the window you can see a beautiful fairy appear, but a closer look shows that it's really a dirty old man who wiggles his toes when he says, "I smell something stinky!" The Nerve Ending Fairy takes the nerve endings from under Ren's pillow and puts them on the back side of his neck. He doesn't have any money, so instead gives him a ball of lint. He resembles Old Man Hunger, yet there are differences: the Nerve Ending Fairy wears a crown instead of a drumstick and has a darker beard. He was voiced by Billy West.
- The Bloody Head Fairy is a minor character in the season 2 episode "Haunted House". He takes the Bloody Head off of Ren's head and gives him two dimes, putting them in his ear. When he disappears, Ren wakes up and starts to panic, telling Stimpy that there is something in his ear. Stimpy calms him down as he extracts the dimes from Ren's ear. He reassures Ren, telling him it is just a couple of dimes and then tells him that he "just got a visit from The Bloody Head Fairy".
- Jasper the Dog a red-nosed Dalmatian dog with blue spots; Jasper has been in a number of episodes. His first appearance ("Big House Blues") had him calmly explaining that "you don't wake up...from the big sleep". All the rest of his appearances were cameos in which he appeared as a normal dog, the leader of the Hermit Union, and even the senior officer of the Royal Canadian Kilted Yaksmen.
- Victor is a sadistic ginger-headed teenager who always wears a white collar, black tie, and sweater vest. Though he dresses sharp, he is actually the school bully and he beats up Ren and Stimpy as well as a young boy named Anthony. Victor was voiced by Danny Cooksey.
- Jerry the Bellybutton Elf is a one-eyed blue creature that lives inside of Stimpy's bellybutton. When Stimpy served Lint Loaf to Jerry, the Bellybutton Elf flips out and reveals himself to be a giant monstrous piece of porkchop named Adonis, Lord of Chaos. He was voiced by Gilbert Gottfried.
- Anthony is a blond-haired boy with unusually round glasses. He is a big fan of Ren & Stimpy, who to come to his house after he writes a letter to them. Anthony's first appearance is in "A Visit to Anthony". Anthony was designed after and voiced by Anthony Raspanti, a 8-years old boy from Newport News, Virginia who wrote one of the first fan letters to the series.
- Anthony's Dad appears in "A Visit to Anthony". He is Anthony's dad that is blue-collar worker, strict, ill-tempered, extremely protective of his son, and has an intense hatred for cartoons, especially Ren and Stimpy. He was voiced by Randy Quaid.
- Brainchild, designed by Bob Camp, is a genius riding an "anuscycle". He appears in "Blazing Entrails". Brainchild inflates Stimpy so Ren could rescue his brain. Bill Mumy voiced Brainchild.
- The Ghost appears to be based on Droopy Dog and his face appears to be modeled after Elmer Fudd. He appeared in "Haunted House", in which he tries to scare Ren and Stimpy. When his attempts fail, he commits suicide by drinking poison and is reborn as a heavyset African-American jazz musician. He is voiced by Billy West.
- The Baboon appears in many episodes. He is a very aggressive olive baboon that is treated like a domesticated dog by Mr. and Mrs. Pipe. In "Stupid Sidekick Union", Ren replaces Stimpy with the Baboon as his stupid sidekick, but it doesn't work too well as Ren is too afraid to hit him when he does something stupid like he would with Stimpy. When Ren finally does hit him, the Baboon mauls him.
- The Dogcatcher appeared in "Big House Blues". Voiced by Jim Smith.
- The Barrette Beret Girl Scouts were three bully Girl Scouts who Ren and Stimpy tried to join with in "Eat My Cookies". After Stimpy gambled away their cookie money, the girls task them into achieving impossible tasks for badges, with only Stimpy being successful. The lead scout was voiced by Rosie O'Donnell, while the other two were both voiced by Cheryl Chase.
- Phil: A bulldog who gets put to sleep in "Big House Blues", although he appears in "Dog Show" later on.
- Ben and Stumpy: These were supposed to be imposters with sock puppets of Ren and Stimpy hired by Haggis MacHaggis, but they became popular. They appeared in "Hard Times for Haggis".
- Myron: Haggis's dim-witted butler.
- Wacky: Haggis's pet Scottish Terrier.
- Ralph: A masochistic talking fly. Whenever the fly appears it is put through physical torture by Ren.
- Stinky: Stimpy's homesick son made of farts that appears in "Son of Stimpy". He was voiced by Billy West.
- Magic Nose Goblins: The collection of Stimpy's mucus he keeps under a table. According to John Kricfalusi and Vincent Waller in the DVD commentary, the name "Magic Nose Goblins" came after Nickelodeon advised against calling them "boogers".
- Tooth Beaver: Appearing in "Ren's Toothache", he gnawed on the nerve ending of Ren's tooth because the latter never brushed his teeth. When all of Ren's teeth disintegrated, he ejected himself from Ren's gums as they proved to be even too disgusting for him.
- Little Girl: A sweet little girl who adopts Ren and Stimpy from the pound in the pilot "Big House Blues". She initially only wanted Ren after mistaking him for a poodle (when in reality, he was covered in Stimpy's hairballs). But after Ren realizes that Stimpy will be left behind to be put to sleep, he easily convinces her to adopt both of them. She was voiced by Cheryl Chase.
- Little Girl's Mom: A doting and loving woman in "Big House Blues" who overwhelms Stimpy and particularly Ren with pet items. It was she who gave Stimpy his beloved litter box, much to Ren's disgust. She was voiced by animator Lynne Naylor.
- Walrus: Appears in "Rubber Nipple Salesmen". When Ren and Stimpy drop by Mr. Horse's house, he pulls out the Walrus who tells them to call the police in a whisper.
- Sid: A tiny, cigar-smoking, sleazy clown who Stimpy raised in "Stimpy's Pet". He was voiced by Phil Hartman doing a Jack Nicholson impression.
